= List of members of the House of Representatives of the Netherlands, 1963–1967 =

House of Representaties, 1963–1967
| ← | 1959–1963 | 1967–1971 | → |
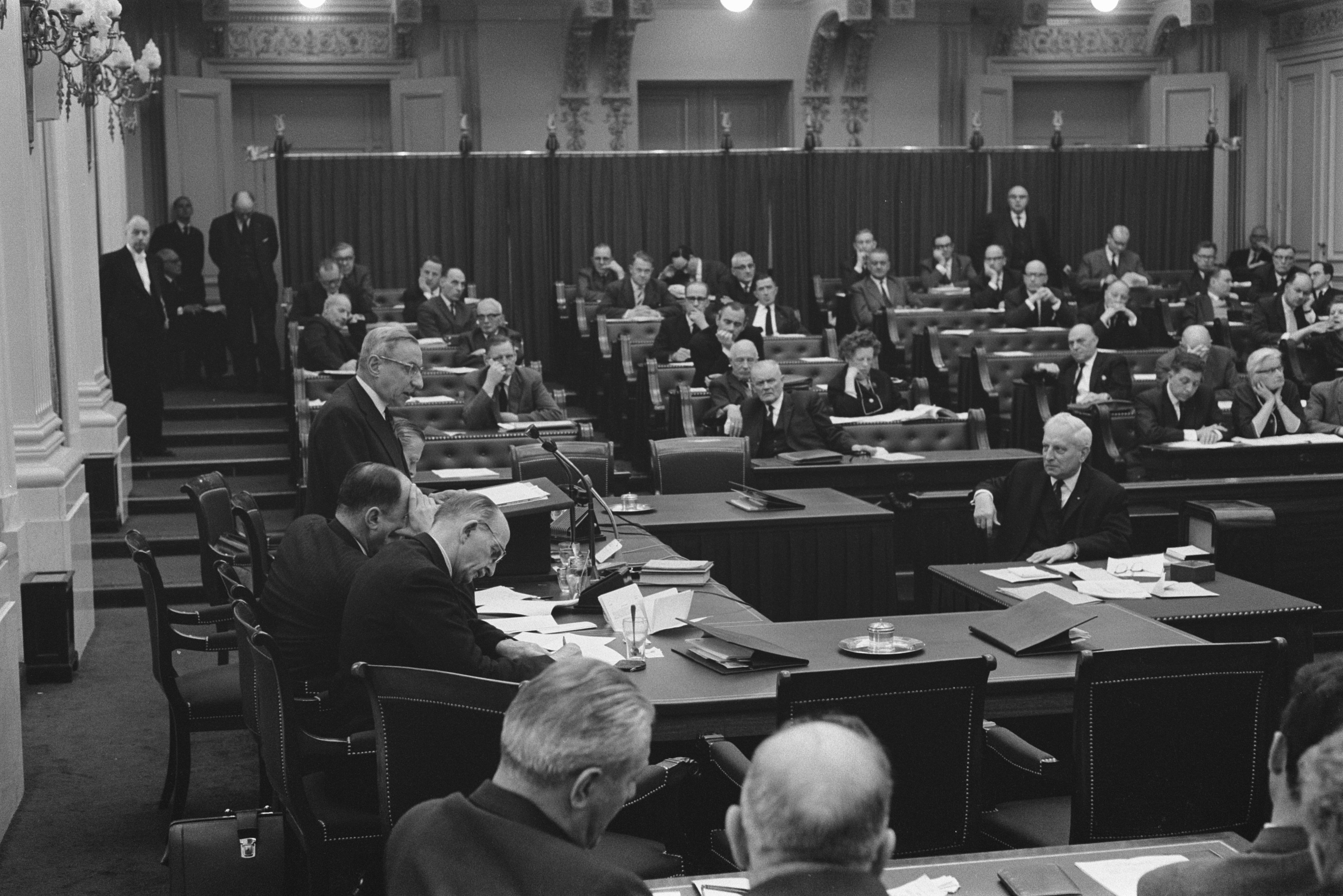

Overview
- Legislative body: House of Representatives
- Meeting place: Binnenhof
- Term: 5 June 1963 – 21 February 1967
- Election: 1963
- Government: Marijnen cabinet (1963–1965); Cals cabinet (1965–1966); Zijlstra cabinet (1966–1967)
- Members: 150

Between 5 June 1963 and 21 February 1967, 183 individuals served as representatives in the House of Representatives, the 150-seat lower house of the States-General of the Netherlands. 150 representatives were elected in the 15 May 1963 general election and installed at the start of the term; 33 representatives were appointed as replacements when elected representatives resigned or died.

Initially, the Marijnen cabinet was formed during the 1963 cabinet formation, consisting of Catholic People's Party (KVP, 50 seats), People's Party for Freedom and Democracy (VVD, 16 seats), Anti-Revolutionary Party (ARP, 13 seats) and Christian Historical Union (CHU, 13 seats). The opposition consisted of Labour Party (PvdA, 43 seats), Communist Party of the Netherlands (CPN, 4 seats), Pacifist Socialist Party (PSP, 4 seats), Farmers' Party (BP, 3 seats), Reformed Political Party (SGP, 3 seats) and Reformed Political League (GPV, 1 seat). After a cabinet crisis in 1965, PvdA replaced the VVD and CHU in the Cals cabinet. After another cabinet crisis in 1966, KVP and ARP formed the minority Zijlstra cabinet.

== Members ==
All members are sworn in at the start of the term, even if they are not new. Assumed office in this list therefore refers to the swearing in during this term, while all members are automatically considered to have left office at the end of the term.

Members of the House of Representatives of the Netherlands, 1963–1967
| Name | Parliamentary group | Assumed office | Term end | Ref. |
|---|---|---|---|---|
| Piet Aalberse jr. | KVP | 5 June 1963 | 21 February 1967 | |
| Wim Aantjes | ARP | 5 June 1963 | 21 February 1967 | |
| Jacques Aarden | KVP | 31 July 1963 | 21 February 1967 | |
| Hette Abma | SGP | 31 July 1963 | 21 February 1967 | |
| Leo Albering | KVP | 5 June 1963 | 21 February 1967 | |
| Jan Andriessen | KVP | 5 June 1963 | 21 February 1967 | |
| Willem Assmann | KVP | 5 June 1963 | 21 February 1967 | |
| Ies Baart | PvdA | 5 June 1963 | 21 February 1967 | |
| Fons Baeten | KVP | 5 June 1963 | 21 February 1967 | |
| Marcus Bakker | CPN | 5 June 1963 | 21 February 1967 | |
| Cas van Beek | KVP | 15 September 1964 | 21 February 1967 | |
| Henk Beernink | CHU | 5 June 1963 | 21 February 1967 | |
| Leo de Bekker | KVP | 29 November 1966 | 21 February 1967 | |
| Jan van Bennekom | ARP | 5 June 1963 | 21 February 1967 | |
| Ed Berg | PvdA | 21 June 1966 | 21 February 1967 | |
| Jan Berger | PvdA | 5 June 1963 | 9 May 1965 | |
| Rob van den Bergh | PvdA | 29 June 1965 | 21 February 1967 | |
| Cees Berkhouwer | VVD | 5 June 1963 | 21 February 1967 | |
| Barend Biesheuvel | ARP | 5 June 1963 | 23 July 1963 | |
| Pieter Blaisse | KVP | 5 June 1963 | 21 February 1967 | |
| Jaap Blom | PvdA | 5 June 1963 | 25 May 1966 | |
| Pieter Bode | CHU | 11 December 1963 | 21 February 1967 | |
| Jaap Boersma | ARP | 15 September 1964 | 21 February 1967 | |
| Kees Boertien | ARP | 18 May 1965 | 21 February 1967 | |
| Jan Bommer | PvdA | 5 June 1963 | 21 February 1967 | |
| Corstiaan Bos | CHU | 5 June 1963 | 21 February 1967 | |
| Cor Brandsma | PvdA | 5 June 1963 | 21 February 1967 | |
| Gerda Brautigam | PvdA | 5 June 1963 | 21 February 1967 | |
| Jeanette ten Broecke Hoekstra | VVD | 5 June 1963 | 21 February 1967 | |
| Tiemen Brouwer | KVP | 5 June 1963 | 21 February 1967 | |
| Hans Bruggeman | PSP | 5 June 1963 | 21 February 1967 | |
| Ben van Buel | KVP | 5 June 1963 | 21 February 1967 | |
| Piet Burggraaf | PSP | 11 December 1963 | 21 February 1967 | |
| Jo Cals | KVP | 5 June 1963 | 13 April 1965 | |
| Han Corver | VVD | 5 June 1963 | 21 February 1967 | |
| Jean Couzy | VVD | 5 June 1963 | 21 February 1967 | |
| Frits Daams | PvdA | 5 June 1963 | 21 February 1967 | |
| Isaäc Nicolaas Theodoor Diepenhorst | CHU | 5 June 1963 | 21 February 1967 | |
| Klaas van Dijk | VVD | 5 June 1963 | 21 February 1967 | |
| Cor van Dis sr. | SGP | 5 June 1963 | 21 February 1967 | |
| Sjef van Dongen | KVP | 5 June 1963 | 21 February 1967 | |
| Harry van Doorn | KVP | 5 June 1963 | 21 February 1967 | |
| Wim Droesen | KVP | 5 June 1963 | 21 February 1967 | |
| Bob Duynstee | KVP | 5 June 1963 | 21 February 1967 | |
| Cees Egas | PvdA | 5 June 1963 | 9 May 1965 | |
| Jan van Eibergen | ARP | 5 June 1963 | 31 August 1964 | |
| Henk van Eijsden | ARP | 5 June 1963 | 15 July 1964 | |
| Pieter Elfferich | ARP | 5 June 1963 | 16 September 1966 | |
| Ben Engelbertink | KVP | 5 June 1963 | 21 February 1967 | |
| Piet Engels | KVP | 5 June 1963 | 21 February 1967 | |
| Henk Engelsman | PvdA | 5 June 1963 | 21 February 1967 | |
| Theo van Eupen | KVP | 17 September 1963 | 10 March 1965 | |
| Ferdinand Fiévez | KVP | 26 January 1965 | 21 February 1967 | |
| Huub Franssen | PvdA | 5 June 1963 | 21 February 1967 | |
| Nico Geelkerken | ARP | 2 July 1963 | 21 February 1967 | |
| Molly Geertsema | VVD | 5 June 1963 | 21 February 1967 | |
| Wil van Gelder | CHU | 5 June 1963 | 21 February 1967 | |
| Wouter van der Gevel | PvdA | 8 June 1965 | 21 February 1967 | |
| Frans Gijzels | KVP | 5 June 1963 | 31 August 1964 | |
| Frans Goedhart | PvdA | 5 June 1963 | 21 February 1967 | |
| Marinus van der Goes van Naters | PvdA | 5 June 1963 | 21 February 1967 | |
| Paul de Groot | CPN | 5 June 1963 | 31 January 1966 | |
| Evert Jan Harmsen | BP | 5 June 1963 | 21 February 1967 | |
| Martien van Helvoort | KVP | 5 June 1963 | 21 February 1967 | |
| Took Heroma-Meilink | PvdA | 5 June 1963 | 21 February 1967 | |
| Nico van den Heuvel | KVP | 5 June 1963 | 21 February 1967 | |
| Henk Hoekstra | CPN | 5 June 1963 | 21 February 1967 | |
| Theo Hogendorp | PvdA | 21 September 1965 | 21 February 1967 | |
| Louis Horsmans | KVP | 17 September 1963 | 21 February 1967 | |
| Tjalle Jager | CPN | 5 June 1963 | 21 February 1967 | |
| Theo Joekes | VVD | 5 June 1963 | 21 February 1967 | |
| Piet Jongeling | GPV | 5 June 1963 | 21 February 1967 | |
| Cor Kammeraad | VVD | 31 July 1963 | 21 February 1967 | |
| Annie Kessel | KVP | 5 June 1963 | 21 February 1967 | |
| Garm Kieft | ARP | 5 June 1963 | 21 February 1967 | |
| Henk Kikkert | CHU | 5 June 1963 | 21 February 1967 | |
| Cors Kleijwegt | PvdA | 5 June 1963 | 21 February 1967 | |
| Cor Kleisterlee jr. | KVP | 5 June 1963 | 21 February 1967 | |
| Marga Klompé | KVP | 5 June 1963 | 21 November 1966 | |
| David Kodde | SGP | 18 June 1963 | 21 February 1967 | |
| Hendrik Koekoek | BP | 5 June 1963 | 21 February 1967 | |
| Jo van Koeverden | KVP | 5 June 1963 | 21 February 1967 | |
| Truus Kok | KVP | 5 June 1963 | 21 February 1967 | |
| Eric Kolfschoten | KVP | 5 June 1963 | 21 February 1967 | |
| Jo Koopman | PvdA | 5 June 1963 | 30 September 1963 | |
| Wim de Kort | KVP | 5 June 1963 | 12 October 1966 | |
| Ferdinand Kranenburg | PvdA | 5 June 1963 | 31 January 1964 | |
| Ada Kuiper-Struyk | VVD | 5 June 1963 | 14 September 1965 | |
| Karel van Laak | KVP | 15 February 1966 | 21 February 1967 | |
| Dick Laan | KVP | 5 June 1963 | 21 February 1967 | |
| Reint Laan | PvdA | 4 February 1964 | 21 February 1967 | |
| Jan Lamberts | PvdA | 5 June 1963 | 21 February 1967 | |
| Henk Lankhorst | PSP | 5 June 1963 | 21 February 1967 | |
| Pierre Lardinois | KVP | 17 September 1963 | 21 February 1967 | |
| Hannie van Leeuwen | ARP | 15 November 1966 | 21 February 1967 | |
| Bob Leibbrandt | PvdA | 13 July 1965 | 21 February 1967 | |
| Trees Lemaire | PvdA | 5 June 1963 | 16 September 1963 | |
| Theo van Lier | PvdA | 5 June 1963 | 21 February 1967 | |
| Anton Lucas | KVP | 5 June 1963 | 29 September 1966 | |
| Jan Maenen | KVP | 5 June 1963 | 21 February 1967 | |
| Victor Marijnen | KVP | 2 July 1963 | 23 July 1963 | |
| Victor Marijnen | KVP | 27 April 1965 | 13 January 1966 | |
| Kees van Meel | KVP | 5 June 1963 | 13 August 1963 | |
| Durk van der Mei | CHU | 5 June 1963 | 21 February 1967 | |
| Wim Meijer | PSP | 5 June 1963 | 30 November 1963 | |
| Jur Mellema | CHU | 5 June 1963 | 21 February 1967 | |
| Jan Meulink | ARP | 5 June 1963 | 31 August 1966 | |
| Marinus Abraham Mieras | SGP | 29 October 1963 | 21 February 1967 | |
| Joep Mommersteeg | KVP | 5 June 1963 | 21 February 1967 | |
| Harry Moorman | KVP | 5 June 1963 | 21 February 1967 | |
| Gerard Nederhorst | PvdA | 5 June 1963 | 21 February 1967 | |
| Roelof Nelissen | KVP | 5 June 1963 | 21 February 1967 | |
| Jacques Noort | KVP | 22 June 1965 | 21 February 1967 | |
| Harrij Notenboom | KVP | 5 June 1963 | 21 February 1967 | |
| Ad Oele | PvdA | 5 June 1963 | 21 February 1967 | |
| Bert Oldenbanning | VVD | 5 June 1963 | 15 September 1965 | |
| Annie van Ommeren-Averink | CPN | 8 February 1966 | 21 February 1967 | |
| Connie Patijn | PvdA | 5 June 1963 | 21 February 1967 | |
| Cor van der Peijl | CHU | 5 June 1963 | 21 February 1967 | |
| Rinus Peijnenburg | KVP | 4 October 1966 | 21 February 1967 | |
| Harry Peschar | PvdA | 5 June 1963 | 21 February 1967 | |
| Kees van der Ploeg | KVP | 5 June 1963 | 21 February 1967 | |
| Sake van der Ploeg | PvdA | 29 June 1965 | 21 February 1967 | |
| Frits Portheine | VVD | 31 July 1963 | 21 February 1967 | |
| Siep Posthumus | PvdA | 5 June 1963 | 3 May 1965 | |
| Jan Reehorst | PvdA | 5 June 1963 | 21 February 1967 | |
| Lambertus Wilhelm Reestman | KVP | 29 November 1966 | 21 February 1967 | |
| Karel van Rijckevorsel | KVP | 5 June 1963 | 21 February 1967 | |
| Dirk Roemers | PvdA | 5 June 1963 | 21 February 1967 | |
| Bauke Roolvink | ARP | 2 July 1963 | 21 February 1967 | |
| Jacqueline Rutgers | ARP | 5 June 1963 | 21 February 1967 | |
| Geert Ruygers | PvdA | 5 June 1963 | 21 February 1967 | |
| Maarten Schakel | ARP | 15 September 1964 | 21 February 1967 | |
| Johan Scheps | PvdA | 5 June 1963 | 21 February 1967 | |
| Tineke Schilthuis | PvdA | 5 June 1963 | 21 February 1967 | |
| Norbert Schmelzer | KVP | 5 June 1963 | 21 February 1967 | |
| Herman Schoemaker | KVP | 5 June 1963 | 30 September 1966 | |
| Willem Scholten | CHU | 5 June 1963 | 21 February 1967 | |
| Wim Schuijt | KVP | 5 June 1963 | 21 February 1967 | |
| Wybrand Schuitemaker | PvdA | 16 June 1965 | 21 February 1967 | |
| Hein Schuring | CHU | 5 June 1963 | 21 February 1967 | |
| Hannie Singer-Dekker | PvdA | 5 June 1963 | 21 February 1967 | |
| Gerard Slotemaker de Bruïne | PSP | 5 June 1963 | 21 February 1967 | |
| Wietze van der Sluis | ARP | 20 September 1966 | 21 February 1967 | |
| Jan Smallenbroek | ARP | 5 June 1963 | 13 April 1965 | |
| Louis van Son | KVP | 5 June 1963 | 27 November 1966 | |
| Haya van Someren-Downer | VVD | 5 June 1963 | 21 February 1967 | |
| Max van der Stoel | PvdA | 5 June 1963 | 21 July 1965 | |
| Joke Stoffels-van Haaften | VVD | 5 June 1963 | 21 February 1967 | |
| Ko Suurhoff | PvdA | 5 June 1963 | 13 April 1965 | |
| Sjeng Tans | PvdA | 5 June 1963 | 21 February 1967 | |
| Bas van den Tempel | PvdA | 5 June 1963 | 21 February 1967 | |
| Frans-Joseph van Thiel | KVP | 5 June 1963 | 21 February 1967 | |
| Arnold Tilanus | CHU | 5 June 1963 | 21 February 1967 | |
| Teun Tolman | CHU | 5 June 1963 | 21 February 1967 | |
| Edzo Toxopeus | VVD | 2 July 1963 | 23 July 1963 | |
| Edzo Toxopeus | VVD | 21 September 1965 | 21 February 1967 | |
| Dany Tuijnman | VVD | 5 June 1963 | 21 February 1967 | |
| Auke van Urk | PvdA | 5 June 1963 | 21 February 1967 | |
| Gerard Veldkamp | KVP | 2 July 1963 | 23 July 1963 | |
| Jakob Vellenga | PvdA | 8 June 1965 | 21 February 1967 | |
| Tom Verdijk | KVP | 31 July 1963 | 21 February 1967 | |
| Willem Vermooten | PvdA | 5 June 1963 | 21 February 1967 | |
| Thieleman Versteeg | ARP | 5 June 1963 | 21 February 1967 | |
| Netty de Vink | KVP | 5 June 1963 | 21 February 1967 | |
| Pieter Vis | PvdA | 5 June 1963 | 21 February 1967 | |
| Martin Visser | VVD | 5 June 1963 | 21 February 1967 | |
| Poulus Voogd | BP (Note: Until 13 December 1966) | 5 June 1963 | 21 February 1967 | |
| Poulus Voogd | Voogd (Note: From 13 December 1966) | 5 June 1963 | 21 February 1967 | |
| Anne Vondeling | PvdA | 5 June 1963 | 13 April 1965 | |
| Joop Voogd | PvdA | 1 October 1963 | 21 February 1967 | |
| Henk Vredeling | PvdA | 5 June 1963 | 21 February 1967 | |
| Jan de Vreeze | KVP | 5 June 1963 | 21 February 1967 | |
| Tjebbe Walburg | ARP | 5 June 1963 | 21 February 1967 | |
| Toon Weijters | KVP | 5 June 1963 | 21 February 1967 | |
| Ans van der Werf-Terpstra | KVP | 1 December 1966 | 21 February 1967 | |
| Theo Westerhout | PvdA | 5 June 1963 | 11 July 1965 | |
| Tjerk Westerterp | KVP | 31 July 1963 | 21 February 1967 | |
| Ep Wieldraaijer | PvdA | 5 June 1963 | 21 February 1967 | |
| Wiebe Wierda | PvdA | 5 June 1963 | 21 February 1967 | |
| Joan Willems | PvdA | 5 June 1963 | 21 February 1967 | |
| Jan Wilmans | PvdA | 17 September 1963 | 21 February 1967 | |
| Johan Witteveen | VVD | 5 June 1963 | 23 July 1963 | |
| Johan Witteveen | VVD | 21 September 1965 | 21 February 1967 | |
| Freule Wttewaall van Stoetwegen | CHU | 5 June 1963 | 21 February 1967 | |
| Roelof Zegering Hadders | VVD | 5 June 1963 | 21 February 1967 | |
| Johan Zwanikken | KVP | 5 June 1963 | 21 February 1967 | |

== Sources ==
- Heiden, Peter van der; Kessel, Alexander van, eds. (2010). Rondom de Nacht van Schmelzer (in Dutch). Amsterdam: Boom. ISBN 978-94-6105-362-6.
