= List of members of the House of Representatives of the Netherlands for the Pacifist Socialist Party =

The Pacifist Socialist Party (PSP) was continuously represented in the Dutch House of Representatives from 1959 until its merger into GroenLinks in 1989. This is a list of all members of the House of Representatives for the PSP.

== List ==
List of members of the House of Representatives of the Netherlands for the Pacifist Socialist Party
Member	Term start	Term end	Ref.
Hans Bruggeman	5 June 1963	21 February 1967	
Piet Burggraaf	11 December 1963	21 February 1967	
Andrée van Es	10 June 1981	13 September 1989	
Henk Gortzak	3 June 1969	9 May 1971	
Henk Lankhorst	20 March 1959	31 May 1969	
Bram van der Lek	23 February 1967	9 May 1971	
Bram van der Lek	7 december 1972	15 January 1978	
Wim Meijer	5 June 1963	30 November 1963	
Oene Noordenbos	7 June 1962	4 June 1963	
Gerard Slotemaker de Bruïne	5 June 1963	21 February 1967	
Fred van der Spek	23 February 1967	7 June 1977	
Fred van der Spek	16 January 1978	20 January 1986	
Nico van der Veen	20 March 1959	19 April 1962	
Hans Wiebenga	23 February 1967	6 December 1972	
Wilbert Willems	10 June 1981	2 June 1986	
