= List of members of the House of Representatives of the Netherlands, 1967–1971 =

House of Representatives, 1967–1971
←	1963–1967	1971–1972	→
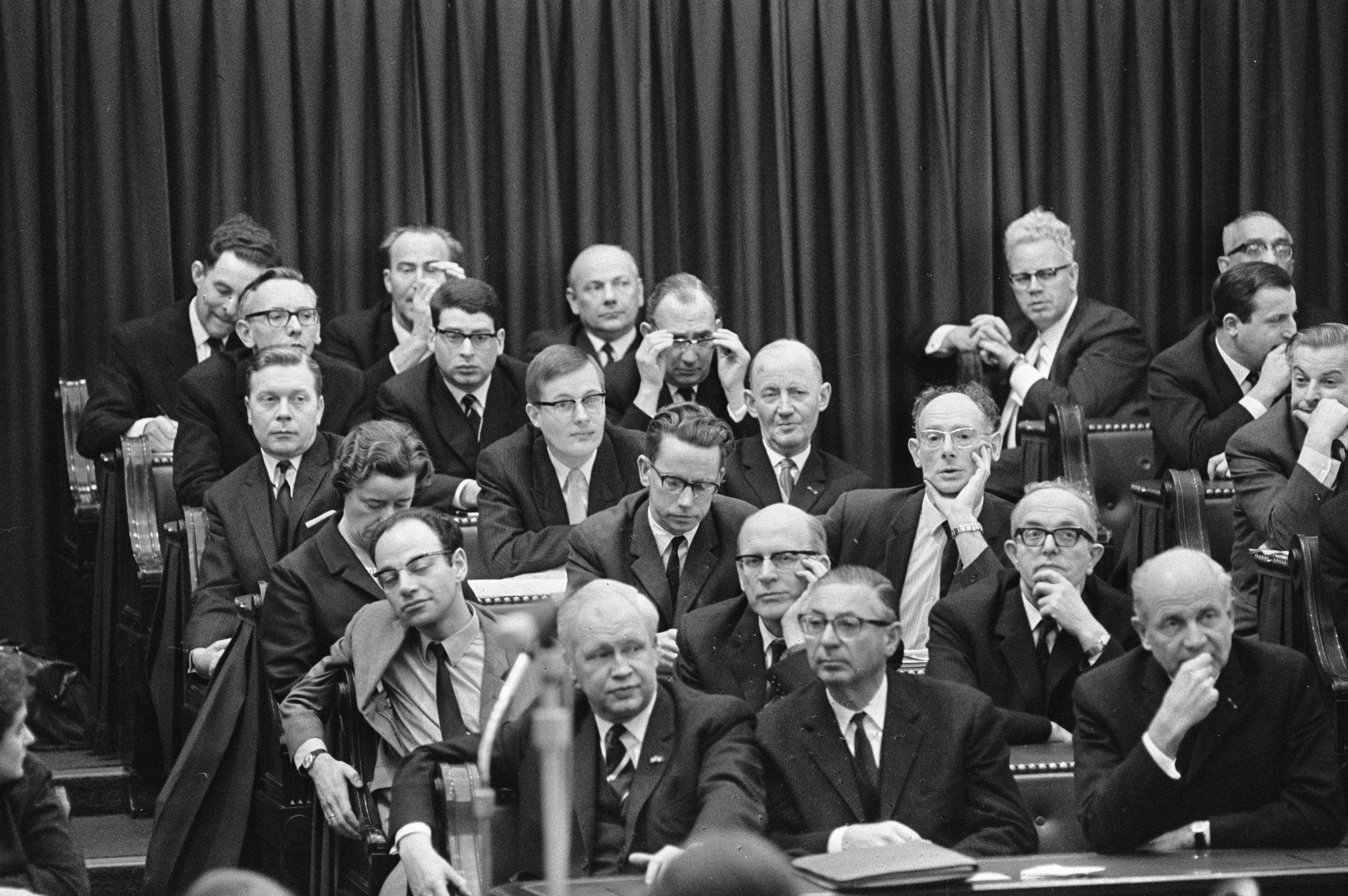
- Members of the Labour Party on the first day of the legislative term

Overview
- Legislative body: House of Representatives
- Meeting place: Binnenhof
- Term: 23 February 1967 – 10 May 1971
- Election: 1967
- Government: De Jong cabinet
- Members: 150
- Speaker of the House of Representatives: Frans-Joseph van Thiel

Between 23 February 1967 and 10 May 1971, 187 individuals served as representatives in the House of Representatives, the 150-seat lower house of the States-General of the Netherlands. 150 representatives were elected in the 15 February 1967 general election and installed at the start of the term; 37 representatives were appointed as replacements when elected representatives resigned or died.

During the 1967 cabinet formation the De Jong cabinet was formed, consisting of Catholic People's Party (KVP, 42 seats), People's Party for Freedom and Democracy (VVD, 17 seats), Anti-Revolutionary Party (ARP, 15 seats) and Christian Historical Union (CHU, 12 seats). The opposition consisted of Labour Party (PvdA, 37 seats), Democrats 66 (D'66, 7 seats), Farmers' Party (BP, 7 seats), Communist Party of the Netherlands (CPN, 5 seats), Pacifist Socialist Party (PSP, 4 seats), Reformed Political Party (SGP, 3 seats) and Reformed Political League (GPV, 1 seat).

During the term, several members switched their parliamentary group affiliation, changing the party composition of the House of Representatives. (Note: Resignations generally do not affect the balance of power, as replacements are appointed from the party list) Jacques Aarden, Paul Janssen and Annie Kessel left the KVP and formed the Group Aarden on 27 February 1968. Johan van de Brake, Evert Harmsen, Hubert Kronenburg and Wouter van Harselaar left the Farmers' Party in June 1968 to form the Group-Harmsen, which Kronenburg left in November 1968 to continue as independent. Frans Goedhart and Wybrand Schuitemaker left the PvdA to form the Group-Goedhart, and were joined in July 1970 by Phia van Veenendaal-van Meggelen. And finally, Nico Verlaan was removed from the Farmers' Party in March 1971 and continued as an independent.

== Members ==
All members are sworn in at the start of the term, even if they are not new. Assumed office in this list therefore refers to the swearing in during this term, while all members are automatically considered to have left office at the end of the term.

Members of the House of Representatives of the Netherlands, 1967–1971
Name	Parliamentary group	Assumed office	Term end	Ref.
Piet Aalberse Jr.	KVP	23 February 1967	15 March 1969	
Willem Aantjes	ARP	23 February 1967	10 May 1971	
Jacques Aarden	KVP	23 February 1967	10 May 1971	
Jacques Aarden	Aarden	23 February 1967	10 May 1971	
Gijs van Aardenne	VVD	18 February 1971	10 May 1971	
Hette Abma	SGP	23 February 1967	10 May 1971	
Leo Albering	KVP	23 February 1967	19 May 1969	
Frans Andriessen	KVP	23 February 1967	10 May 1971	
Wim Assman	KVP	23 February 1967	10 May 1971	
Fons Baeten	KVP	19 April 1967	14 December 1967	
Marcus Bakker	CPN	23 February 1967	10 May 1971	
Nel Barendregt	PvdA	14 November 1967	10 May 1971	
Cas van Beek	KVP	23 February 1967	10 May 1971	
Pol de Beer	VVD	11 May 1969	10 May 1971	
Henk Beernink	CHU	23 February 1967	4 April 1967	
Leo Bekker	KVP	20 April 1967	10 May 1971	
Jan van Bennekom	ARP	23 February 1967	6 September 1970	
Ed Berg	PvdA	23 February 1967	10 May 1971	
Rob van den Bergh	PvdA	18 April 1967	10 May 1971	
Cees Berkhouwer	VVD	23 February 1967	10 May 1971	
Barend Biesheuvel	ARP	23 February 1967	10 May 1971	
Pieter Bode	CHU	23 February 1967	31 October 1968	
Jaap Boersma	ARP	23 February 1967	10 May 1971	
Kees Boertien	ARP	23 February 1967	10 May 1971	
Arie de Boo	CHU	23 February 1967	11 November 1968	
Gijs Boot	KVP	23 February 1967	10 May 1971	
Corstiaan Bos	CHU	23 February 1967	10 May 1971	
Johan van de Brake	BP	23 February 1967	10 May 1971	
Johan van de Brake	Harmsen	23 February 1967	10 May 1971	
Gerda Brautigam	PvdA	23 February 1967	10 May 1971	
Tiemen Brouwer	KVP	23 February 1967	10 May 1971	
Ben van Buel	KVP	23 February 1967	10 May 1971	
Pam Cornelissen	KVP	23 February 1967	10 May 1971	
Frits Daams	PvdA	23 February 1967	31 October 1969	
Piet Dankert	PvdA	6 February 1968	10 May 1971	
Norma Dettmeijer-Labberton	VVD	2 October 1968	10 May 1971	
Isaäc Diepenhorst	ARP	23 February 1967	10 May 1971	
Isaäc Diepenhorst	CHU	23 February 1971	10 May 1971	
Klaas van Dijk	VVD	23 February 1967	10 May 1971	
Minne Dijkstra	D66	23 February 1967	10 May 1971	
Rie Dirkx	KVP	30 January 1968	10 May 1971	
Cor van Dis Sr.	SGP	23 February 1967	10 May 1971	
Hans van den Doel	PvdA	23 February 1967	10 May 1971	
Dick Dolman	PvdA	5 December 1970	10 May 1971	
Harry van Doorn	KVP	23 February 1967	27 February 1968	
Willy Dusarduijn	KVP	23 February 1967	10 May 1971	
Kees Egas	PvdA	23 February 1967	10 May 1971	
Ben Engelbertink	KVP	23 February 1967	31 August 1970	
Piet Engels	KVP	23 February 1967	10 May 1971	
Meiny Epema-Brugman	PvdA	28 April 1970	10 May 1971	
Ferdinand Fiévez	KVP	23 February 1967	10 May 1971	
Huub Franssen	PvdA	23 February 1967	10 May 1971	
Nico Geelkerken	ARP	23 February 1967	10 May 1971	
Molly Geertsema	VVD	23 February 1967	10 May 1971	
Aart Geurtsen	VVD	27 June 1967	10 May 1971	
Wout van der Gevel	PvdA	23 February 1967	15 November 1967 (Note: Died in office)	
Aar de Goede	D66	23 February 1967	10 May 1971	
Frans Goedhart	PvdA (Note: Until 13 May 1970)	23 February 1967	10 May 1971	
Frans Goedhart	Goedhart (Note: From 14 May 1970)	23 February 1967	10 May 1971	
Henk Gortzak	PSP	3 June 1969	10 May 1971	
Anneke Goudsmit	D66	23 February 1967	10 May 1971	
Bob Goudzwaard	ARP	23 February 1967	10 May 1971	
Berthe Groensmit-van der Kallen	KVP	23 February 1967	10 May 1971	
Bert Haars	CHU	18 April 1967	10 May 1971	
Evert Harmsen	BP	23 February 1967	10 May 1971	
Evert Harmsen	Harmsen	23 February 1967	10 May 1971	
Wouter van Harselaar	BP	1 February 1968	10 May 1971	
Wouter van Harselaar	Harmsen	1 February 1968	10 May 1971	
Ben Hermsen	KVP	3 June 1969	10 May 1971	
Took Heroma-Meilink	PvdA	23 February 1967	10 May 1971	
Nico van den Heuvel	KVP	23 February 1967	10 May 1971	
Henk Hoekstra	CPN	23 February 1967	10 May 1971	
Theodorus Hogendorp	PvdA	23 February 1967	16 August 1968 (Note: Died in office)	
Dolf Hutschemaekers	KVP	23 February 1967	10 May 1971	
Sef Imkamp	D66	23 February 1967	10 May 1971	
Jan Hendrik Jansen	KVP	19 April 1967	10 May 1971	
Paul Janssen	KVP	23 February 1967	10 May 1971	
Paul Janssen	Aarden	23 February 1967	10 May 1971	
Theo Joekes	VVD	23 February 1967	10 May 1971	
Piet de Jong	KVP	23 February 1967	4 April 1967	
Pieter Jongeling	GPV	23 February 1967	10 May 1971	
Annie Kessel	KVP	23 February 1967	10 May 1971	
Annie Kessel	Aarden	23 February 1967	10 May 1971	
Mike Keyzer	VVD	23 February 1967	17 April 1967	
Garmt Kieft	ARP	23 February 1967	10 May 1971	
Henk Kikkert	CHU	23 February 1967	10 May 1971	
Cor Kleisterlee	KVP	23 February 1967	10 May 1971	
Marga Klompé	KVP	23 February 1967	4 April 1967	
Hendrik Koekoek	BP	23 February 1967	10 May 1971	
Jo van Koeverden	KVP	23 February 1967	10 May 1971	
Truus Kok	KVP	23 February 1967	10 May 1971	
Eric Kolfschoten	KVP	23 February 1967	18 June 1969	
Henk Koning	VVD	23 February 1967	10 May 1971	
Hans de Koster	VVD	23 February 1967	11 June 1967	
Gerard Koudijs	VVD	23 February 1967	10 May 1971	
Wim Kremer	CPN	23 February 1967	10 May 1971	
Hubert Kronenburg	BP	23 February 1967	10 May 1971	
Hubert Kronenburg	Harmsen	23 February 1967	10 May 1971	
Hubert Kronenburg	Kronenburg	23 February 1967	10 May 1971	
Toon Krosse	KVP	23 February 1967	10 May 1971	
Karel van Laak	KVP	5 March 1968	10 May 1971	
Rein Laan	PvdA	23 February 1967	29 February 1968	
Cees Laban	PvdA	18 December 1967	10 May 1971	
Jan Lamberts	PvdA	23 February 1967	10 May 1971	
Henk Lankhorst	PSP	23 February 1967	31 May 1969	
Pierre Lardinois	KVP	23 February 1967	4 April 1967	
Hannie van Leeuwen	ARP	23 February 1967	10 May 1971	
Pieter Leffertstra	BP	23 February 1967	24 January 1968	
Bram van der Lek	PSP	23 February 1967	10 May 1971	
Arie Lems	PvdA	23 February 1967	10 May 1971	
Theo van Lier	PvdA	23 February 1967	10 May 1971	
André van der Louw	PvdA	12 January 1971	10 May 1971	
Joseph Luns	KVP	23 February 1967	4 April 1967	
Jan Maenen	KVP	23 February 1967	10 May 1971	
Jan Masman	PvdA	23 February 1967	10 May 1971	
Durk van der Mei	CHU	23 February 1967	10 May 1971	
Han Meijer	KVP	24 February 1970	10 May 1971	
José de Meijer	KVP	23 February 1967	10 May 1971	
Jur Mellema	CHU	23 February 1967	10 May 1971	
Hans van Mierlo	D66	23 February 1967	10 May 1971	
Joep Mommersteeg	KVP	23 February 1967	10 May 1971	
Riekus de Mooij	ARP	19 September 1967	10 May 1971	
Gerard Nederhorst	PvdA	23 February 1967	10 May 1971	
Roelof Nelissen	KVP	23 February 1967	13 January 1970	
Harrij Notenboom	KVP	23 February 1967	10 May 1971	
Toon Nuijens	BP	23 February 1967	10 May 1971	
Erwin Nypels	D66	23 February 1967	10 May 1971	
Ad Oele	PvdA	23 February 1967	10 May 1971	
Annemiek Padt-Jansen	PvdA	3 June 1969	10 May 1971	
Cor van der Peijl	CHU	23 February 1967	10 May 1971	
Rinus Peijnenburg	KVP	23 February 1967	10 May 1971	
Harry Peschar	PvdA	23 February 1967	10 May 1971	
Kees van der Ploeg	KVP	23 February 1967	10 May 1971	
Sake van der Ploeg	PvdA	23 February 1967	10 May 1971	
Frits Portheine	VVD	23 February 1967	10 May 1971	
Siep Posthumus	PvdA	23 February 1967	10 May 1971	
Koos Rietkerk	VVD	23 February 1967	10 May 1971	
Dirk Roemers	PvdA	23 February 1967	31 October 1967	
Hein Roethof	PvdA	4 November 1969	10 May 1971	
Bauke Roolvink	ARP	23 February 1967	4 April 1967	
Henk van Rossum	SGP	23 February 1967	10 May 1971	
Geert Ruygers	PvdA	23 February 1967	17 February 1970	
Theo van Schaik	KVP	23 February 1967	10 May 1971	
Maarten Schakel	ARP	23 February 1967	10 May 1971	
Wim van het Schip	CPN	23 February 1967	10 May 1971	
Adri Schipper	PvdA	5 March 1968	23 April 1970	
Johan Schlingemann	VVD	9 May 1967	7 February 1971	
Norbert Schmelzer	KVP	23 February 1967	27 April 1971	
Jan-Nico Scholten	ARP	15 September 1970	10 May 1971	
Willem Scholten	CHU	23 February 1967	10 May 1971	
Wim Schuijt	KVP	19 April 1967	10 May 1971	
Wybrand Schuitemaker	PvdA	26 February 1970	10 May 1971	
Wybrand Schuitemaker	Goedhart	26 February 1970	10 May 1971	
Hein Schuring	CHU	15 February 1971	10 May 1971	
Hannie Singer-Dekker	PvdA	23 February 1967	9 May 1970	
Wietze van der Sluis	ARP	23 February 1967	12 September 1967	
Haya van Someren-Downer	VVD	23 February 1967	30 September 1968	
Louis Son	KVP	23 February 1967	17 April 1967	
Fred van der Spek	PSP	23 February 1967	10 May 1971	
Max van der Stoel	PvdA	23 February 1967	10 May 1971	
Sjeng Tans	PvdA	23 February 1967	2 July 1970	
Frans-Joseph van Thiel	KVP	23 February 1967	10 May 1971	
Ed van Thijn	PvdA	23 February 1967	10 May 1971	
Arnold Tilanus	CHU	23 February 1967	10 May 1971	
Teun Tolman	CHU	23 February 1967	10 May 1971	
Edzo Toxopeus	VVD	23 February 1967	31 October 1969	
Danny Tuijnman	VVD	23 February 1967	10 May 1971	
Joop den Uyl	PvdA	23 February 1967	10 May 1971	
Els Veder-Smit	VVD	23 February 1967	10 May 1971	
Phia van Veenendaal-van Meggelen	Goedhart (Note: Elected on the PvdA candidate list)	28 July 1970	10 May 1971	
Antoon Veerman	ARP	18 April 1967	10 May 1971	
Jakob Vellenga	PvdA	3 September 1968	10 May 1971	
Nico Verlaan	BP	23 February 1967	10 May 1971	
Nico Verlaan	Verlaan	23 February 1967	10 May 1971	
Erik Visser	D66	23 February 1967	10 May 1971	
Anne Vondeling	PvdA	23 February 1967	10 May 1971	
Henk Vonhoff	VVD	23 February 1967	10 May 1971	
Joop Voogd	PvdA	23 February 1967	10 May 1971	
Henk Vredeling	PvdA	23 February 1967	10 May 1971	
Jan de Vreeze	KVP	23 February 1967	10 May 1971	
Maarten Vrolijk	PvdA	23 February 1967	10 May 1971	
Tjebbe Walburg	ARP	23 February 1967	10 May 1971	
Steef Weijers	KVP	22 September 1970	10 May 1971	
Toon Weijters	KVP	23 February 1967	10 May 1971	
Theo Westerhout	PvdA	23 February 1967	30 April 1969	
Tjerk Westerterp	KVP	23 February 1967	10 May 1971	
Hans Wiebenga	PSP	23 February 1967	10 May 1971	
Hans Wiegel	VVD	18 April 1967	10 May 1971	
Ep Wieldraaijer	PvdA	23 February 1967	10 May 1971	
Wiebe Wierda	PvdA	23 February 1967	10 May 1971	
Ko Wierenga	PvdA	23 February 1967	10 May 1971	
Joan Willems	PvdA	23 February 1967	15 August 1970	
Johan Witteveen	VVD	23 February 1967	4 April 1967	
Joop Wolff	CPN	23 February 1967	10 May 1971	
Gerard Woorst	KVP	20 April 1967	10 May 1971	
Freule Wttewaall van Stoetwegen	CHU	23 February 1967	10 May 1971	
Roelof Zegering Hadders	VVD	23 February 1967	10 May 1971	
Rinse Zijlstra	ARP	23 February 1967	10 May 1971	

== Sources ==
- Merriënboer, Johan van; Baalen, Carla van, eds. (2013). Polarisatie en hoogconjunctuur: Het kabinet-De Jong 1967-1971. Parlementaire geschiedenis van Nederland na 1945 (in Dutch). Amsterdam: Boom. hdl:2066/120953. ISBN 978-94-6105-509-5.
