= Wim Meijer =

Wim Meijer may refer to:

- Wim Meijer (Pacifist Socialist Party) (1923–2001), Dutch politician
- Wim Meijer (Labour Party) (born 1939), Dutch politician
