= 1959 Dutch general election =

- 12 March 1959
- All 150 seats in the House of Representatives; 76 seats needed for a majority
- Turnout: 95.57% (▲0.07pp)
| Party | Leader | Vote % | Seats | +/– |
|---|---|---|---|---|
| KVP | Carl Romme | 31.60 | 49 | 0 |
| PvdA | Jaap Burger | 30.36 | 48 | −2 |
| VVD | Pieter Oud | 12.21 | 19 | +6 |
| ARP | Jelle Zijlstra | 9.39 | 14 | −1 |
| CHU | Henk Beernink | 8.11 | 12 | −1 |
| CPN | Paul de Groot | 2.41 | 3 | −4 |
| SGP | Pieter Zandt | 2.16 | 3 | 0 |
| PSP | Henk Lankhorst, Nico van der Veen | 1.84 | 2 | New |
This lists parties that won seats. See the complete results below.
Most voted-for party by municipality
| Cabinet before | Cabinet after |
|---|---|
| Second Beel cabinet KVP–ARP–CHU | De Quay cabinet KVP–VVD–ARP–CHU |

General elections were held in the Netherlands on 12 March 1959. The Catholic People's Party emerged as the largest party, winning 49 of the 150 seats in the House of Representatives.

== Results ==
| Party | Votes | % | Seats | +/– |
|---|---|---|---|---|
| Catholic People's Party | 1,895,914 | 31.60 | 49 | 0 |
| Labour Party | 1,821,285 | 30.36 | 48 | –2 |
| People's Party for Freedom and Democracy | 732,658 | 12.21 | 19 | +6 |
| Anti-Revolutionary Party | 563,091 | 9.39 | 14 | –1 |
| Christian Historical Union | 486,429 | 8.11 | 12 | –1 |
| Communist Party of the Netherlands | 144,542 | 2.41 | 3 | –4 |
| Reformed Political Party | 129,678 | 2.16 | 3 | 0 |
| Pacifist Socialist Party | 110,499 | 1.84 | 2 | New |
| Reformed Political League | 39,972 | 0.67 | 0 | 0 |
| Farmers' Party | 39,423 | 0.66 | 0 | New |
| Brug Group | 34,723 | 0.58 | 0 | New |
| Positive Christian National Union | 1,317 | 0.02 | 0 | New |
| Total | 5,999,531 | 100.00 | 150 | 0 |
| Valid votes | 5,999,531 | 97.66 | | |
| Invalid/blank votes | 143,878 | 2.34 | | |
| Total votes | 6,143,409 | 100.00 | | |
| Registered voters/turnout | 6,427,864 | 95.57 | | |
Source: CBS, Nohlen & Stöver

=== By province ===
Results by province
| Province | KVP | PvdA | VVD | ARP | CHU | CPN | SGP | PSP | Others |
|---|---|---|---|---|---|---|---|---|---|
| Drenthe | 6.9 | 42.5 | 18.4 | 15.3 | 11.5 | 1.9 | 0.2 | 0.6 | 2.6 |
| Friesland | 6.9 | 38.7 | 10.4 | 21.9 | 16.2 | 2.0 | 0.7 | 1.7 | 1.5 |
| Gelderland | 31.9 | 29.1 | 11.0 | 9.1 | 12.2 | 0.6 | 3.6 | 0.7 | 1.8 |
| Groningen | 5.8 | 40.7 | 16.0 | 16.8 | 9.3 | 4.8 | 0.2 | 1.7 | 4.7 |
| Limburg | 79.5 | 15.0 | 2.5 | 1.0 | 0.7 | 0.7 | 0.1 | 0.2 | 0.3 |
| North Brabant | 74.0 | 15.2 | 4.2 | 2.6 | 2.3 | 0.4 | 0.6 | 0.3 | 0.4 |
| North Holland | 23.4 | 33.1 | 16.8 | 7.5 | 4.9 | 6.1 | 0.6 | 4.7 | 2.9 |
| Overijssel | 28.1 | 30.0 | 9.6 | 10.1 | 12.9 | 2.4 | 2.7 | 0.9 | 3.1 |
| South Holland | 18.5 | 36.4 | 15.4 | 11.3 | 9.0 | 2.1 | 3.8 | 2.0 | 1.5 |
| Southern IJsselmeer Polders | 24.4 | 24.7 | 9.7 | 20.0 | 15.4 | 0.4 | 2.1 | 0.8 | 2.5 |
| Utrecht | 25.5 | 29.7 | 13.8 | 12.3 | 10.6 | 0.9 | 3.3 | 1.5 | 2.4 |
| Zeeland | 21.1 | 29.3 | 11.1 | 12.5 | 14.9 | 0.4 | 8.8 | 0.4 | 1.5 |
