= 1963 Dutch general election =

- 15 May 1963
- All 150 seats in the House of Representatives; 76 seats needed for a majority
- Turnout: 95.13% (▼0.44pp)
| Party | Leader | Vote % | Seats | +/– |
|---|---|---|---|---|
| KVP | Wim de Kort | 31.88 | 50 | +1 |
| PvdA | Anne Vondeling | 28.01 | 43 | −5 |
| VVD | Edzo Toxopeus | 10.29 | 16 | −3 |
| ARP | Barend Biesheuvel | 8.72 | 13 | −1 |
| CHU | Henk Beernink | 8.58 | 13 | +1 |
| PSP | Henk Lankhorst | 3.03 | 4 | +2 |
| CPN | Paul de Groot | 2.77 | 4 | +1 |
| SGP | Cor van Dis Sr. | 2.30 | 3 | 0 |
| BP | Hendrik Koekoek | 2.13 | 3 | +3 |
| GPV | Piet Jongeling | 0.74 | 1 | +1 |
This lists parties that won seats. See the complete results below.
Most voted-for party by municipality
| Cabinet before | Cabinet after |
|---|---|
| De Quay cabinet KVP–VVD–ARP–CHU | Marijnen cabinet KVP–VVD–ARP–CHU |

General elections were held in the Netherlands on 15 May 1963. The Catholic People's Party (KVP) remained the largest party, winning 50 of the 150 seats in the House of Representatives.

The elections led to a four-party coalition government initially consisting of the KVP, People's Party for Freedom and Democracy, Anti-Revolutionary Party (ARP) and Christian Historical Union. In 1965 this coalition was replaced by one consisting of the KVP, Labour Party and ARP.

== Results ==
| Party | Votes | % | Seats | +/– |
|---|---|---|---|---|
| Catholic People's Party | 1,995,352 | 31.88 | 50 | +1 |
| Labour Party | 1,753,084 | 28.01 | 43 | –5 |
| People's Party for Freedom and Democracy | 643,839 | 10.29 | 16 | –3 |
| Anti-Revolutionary Party | 545,836 | 8.72 | 13 | –1 |
| Christian Historical Union | 536,801 | 8.58 | 13 | +1 |
| Pacifist Socialist Party | 189,373 | 3.03 | 4 | +2 |
| Communist Party of the Netherlands | 173,325 | 2.77 | 4 | +1 |
| Reformed Political Party | 143,818 | 2.30 | 3 | 0 |
| Farmers' Party | 133,231 | 2.13 | 3 | +3 |
| Reformed Political League | 46,324 | 0.74 | 1 | +1 |
| Economic Appeal Party | 37,554 | 0.60 | 0 | New |
| Liberal State Party | 22,353 | 0.36 | 0 | New |
| Liberal Union–Safe Traffic and 100,100 Houses Each Year | 21,048 | 0.34 | 0 | New |
| New Democratic Party | 13,064 | 0.21 | 0 | New |
| Christian National People's Party | 1,824 | 0.03 | 0 | New |
| Grol List | 876 | 0.01 | 0 | New |
| People's Referendum | 819 | 0.01 | 0 | New |
| Total | 6,258,521 | 100.00 | 150 | 0 |
| Valid votes | 6,258,521 | 97.49 | | |
| Invalid/blank votes | 161,443 | 2.51 | | |
| Total votes | 6,419,964 | 100.00 | | |
| Registered voters/turnout | 6,748,611 | 95.13 | | |
Source: CBS, Nohlen & Stöver

=== By province ===
Results by province
| Province | KVP | PvdA | VVD | ARP | CHU | PSP | CPN | SGP | BP | GPV | Others |
|---|---|---|---|---|---|---|---|---|---|---|---|
| Drenthe | 7.6 | 40.1 | 15.5 | 14.7 | 11.6 | 1.8 | 2.0 | 0.5 | 4.2 | 1.3 | 0.7 |
| Friesland | 7.3 | 35.0 | 8.1 | 21.8 | 16.3 | 3.9 | 2.1 | 0.8 | 2.8 | 1.2 | 0.7 |
| Gelderland | 31.9 | 27.4 | 9.3 | 7.9 | 12.8 | 1.3 | 0.8 | 3.7 | 3.2 | 0.5 | 0.8 |
| Groningen | 6.5 | 38.1 | 13.1 | 16.2 | 10.1 | 3.6 | 5.0 | 0.4 | 2.2 | 3.7 | 1.0 |
| Limburg | 77.5 | 12.9 | 2.3 | 0.9 | 0.8 | 0.5 | 1.2 | 0.1 | 2.3 | 0.1 | 1.4 |
| North Brabant | 71.9 | 13.5 | 4.1 | 2.4 | 2.4 | 0.7 | 0.5 | 0.6 | 2.1 | 0.1 | 1.6 |
| North Holland | 24.2 | 30.3 | 13.7 | 7.1 | 5.5 | 6.4 | 7.2 | 0.7 | 2.0 | 0.3 | 2.6 |
| Overijssel | 28.1 | 27.8 | 8.0 | 9.5 | 13.0 | 2.0 | 2.5 | 2.9 | 3.2 | 2.1 | 0.9 |
| South Holland | 19.2 | 34.3 | 13.2 | 10.5 | 9.7 | 3.6 | 2.4 | 4.0 | 1.2 | 0.5 | 1.5 |
| Southern IJsselmeer Polders | 21.4 | 30.3 | 6.6 | 15.9 | 16.7 | 2.1 | 1.1 | 1.7 | 1.0 | 2.8 | 0.4 |
| Utrecht | 25.8 | 27.5 | 12.3 | 11.0 | 11.7 | 2.6 | 1.2 | 3.6 | 1.7 | 1.1 | 1.6 |
| Zeeland | 20.8 | 27.5 | 9.3 | 11.8 | 15.8 | 1.0 | 0.6 | 9.2 | 2.1 | 0.9 | 1.1 |
