= 1981 Dutch general election =

- 26 May 1981
- All 150 seats in the House of Representatives; 76 seats needed for a majority
- Turnout: 87.0% (▼1.1 pp)
Party	Leader	Vote %	Seats	+/–
CDA	Dries van Agt	30.8%	48	−1
PvdA	Joop den Uyl	28.3%	44	−9
VVD	Hans Wiegel	17.3%	26	−2
D'66	Jan Terlouw	11.1%	17	+9
PSP	Fred van der Spek	2.1%	3	+2
CPN	Marcus Bakker	2.1%	3	+1
SGP	Henk van Rossum	2.0%	3	0
PPR	Ria Beckers	2.0%	3	0
RPF	Meindert Leerling	1.2%	2	+2
GPV	Gert Schutte	0.8%	1	0
This lists parties that won seats. See the complete results below.
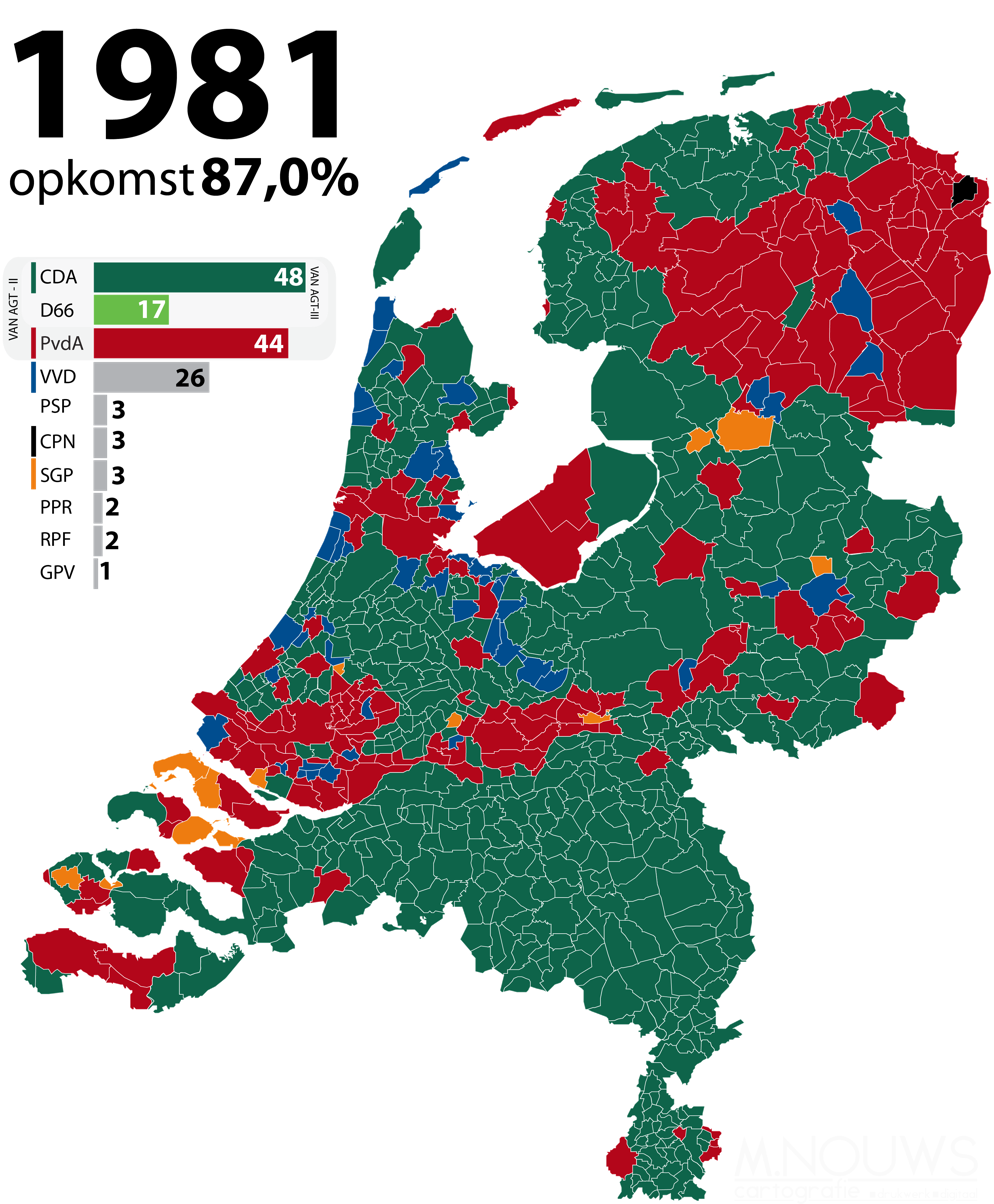
Most voted-for party by municipality
Cabinet before	Cabinet after
First Van Agt cabinet CDA–VVD	Second Van Agt cabinet CDA–PvdA–D'66

General elections were held in the Netherlands on 26 May 1981. The Christian Democratic Appeal (CDA) emerged as the largest party, winning 48 of the 150 seats in the House of Representatives.

The incumbent Christian Democratic Appeal-People's Party for Freedom and Democracy coalition lost its overall majority leading to a new coalition being formed between the CDA, the Labour Party (PvdA) and Democrats 66, with the CDA's Dries van Agt continuing as Prime Minister. However due to disagreements between the CDA and PvdA on government spending the coalition collapsed after just a year, leading to fresh elections.

== Results ==
Party	Votes	%	Seats	+/–
Christian Democratic Appeal	2,677,259	30.81	48	–1
Labour Party	2,458,452	28.29	44	–9
People's Party for Freedom and Democracy	1,505,311	17.32	26	–2
Democrats 66	961,121	11.06	17	+9
Pacifist Socialist Party	184,422	2.12	3	+2
Communist Party of the Netherlands	178,292	2.05	3	+1
Reformed Political Party	171,324	1.97	3	0
Political Party of Radicals	171,042	1.97	3	0
Reformatory Political Federation	108,364	1.25	2	+2
Reformed Political League	70,878	0.82	1	0
Democratic Socialists '70	48,568	0.56	0	–1
Evangelical People's Party	45,189	0.52	0	New
Socialist Party	30,380	0.35	0	0
Roman Catholic Party of the Netherlands	20,812	0.24	0	0
Rightist People's Party	17,371	0.20	0	–1
Centre Party	12,242	0.14	0	New
Dutch People's Union	10,641	0.12	0	0
Liveable Netherlands	8,336	0.10	0	New
Survive Together or Die	3,377	0.04	0	New
Realists '81	2,080	0.02	0	New
International Communist League	1,814	0.02	0	New
God with Us	918	0.01	0	New
Wereld Welzijns Bewustwording	891	0.01	0	New
Party for the Liquidation of the Netherlands	826	0.01	0	New
The Peace Party	464	0.01	0	New
Partij Van Rijksgenoten	207	0.00	0	New
Small Party	186	0.00	0	New
Dutch Evolution Party	70	0.00	0	New
Total	8,690,837	100.00	150	0
Valid votes	8,690,837	99.46		
Invalid/blank votes	47,401	0.54		
Total votes	8,738,238	100.00		
Registered voters/turnout	10,040,121	87.03		
Source: Kiesraad

=== By province ===
Results by province
Province	CDA	PvdA	VVD	D'66	PSP	CPN	SGP	PPR	RPF	GPV	Others
Drenthe	24.8	38.6	17.8	9.3	1.3	1.3	0.3	1.6	1.5	1.6	1.9
Friesland	33.2	33.2	12.7	9.5	1.7	1.7	0.8	1.8	2.1	1.4	1.9
Gelderland	34.4	26.1	16.6	10.2	2.1	0.8	3.4	2.1	1.7	0.5	2.1
Groningen	21.4	39.3	13.4	8.8	2.6	4.1	0.2	2.2	1.7	3.7	2.6
Limburg	43.4	25.3	12.6	11.2	1.6	1.1	0.1	1.9	0.1	0.1	2.6
North Brabant	42.7	23.6	14.5	11.2	1.9	0.9	0.5	1.9	0.3	0.1	2.4
North Holland	22.7	28.4	21.3	12.4	3.5	5.3	0.4	2.4	0.8	0.3	2.5
Overijssel	37.8	26.8	13.2	9.2	1.2	1.1	2.8	1.5	2.4	2.1	1.9
South Holland	23.7	31.2	19.8	12.0	1.9	1.9	3.5	1.7	1.8	1.6	0.9
Southern IJsselmeer Polders	20.8	30.8	18.9	14.6	1.7	4.6	0.6	2.4	1.5	1.0	3.1
Utrecht	28.9	22.6	21.9	11.4	2.5	1.4	3.0	2.5	1.8	1.4	2.6
Zeeland	29.5	27.2	17.0	9.9	1.1	0.7	8.0	1.8	1.9	1.2	1.7
