= Socialist Alternative Politics =

Socialist Alternative Politics Socialistische Alternatieve Politiek
- Founded: 1972
- Split from: Pacifist Socialist Party
- Headquarters: Lombokstraat 40, 1094 AL Amsterdam
- Newspaper: Grenzeloos
- Youth wing: Rebel (1980-2000)
- Ideology: Socialism; Marxism; Trotskyism
- Political position: Far-left
- National affiliation: SP
- International affiliation: Fourth International

Website
- www.grenzeloos.org

The Socialist Alternative Politics (Dutch: Socialistische Alternatieve Politiek, or SAP) is a Trotskyist political group in the Netherlands without parliamentary representation.

== History ==
=== Early roots of the SAP ===
The SAP traces back its roots to the beginning of the Trotskyist movement in the Netherlands. In 1945 the Revolutionary Communist Party was founded as the Dutch member of the Fourth International. However the party was unsuccessful as an independent party and was disbanded in 1952. The former RCP members opted for an entryist tactic in the PvdA. They formed the Social Democratic Centre (SDC) as an internal pressure group to move the PvdA leftwards. However the SDC membership was expelled from the PvdA in 1959.

This severely weakened the Dutch section of the Fourth International. Their entryist strategy was expanded to include other leftwing parties and organizations, mainly the Socialist Workers Party (Dutch: Socialistische Werkerspartij), the Workers' Youth Central (youth movement of the NVV ) and later the Pacifist Socialist Party (PSP). Within the PSP it formed the Proletarian Left (PL) group. The PL and the PSP leadership clashed on the formation of a broad progressive coalition together with the PvdA and the progressive Political Party of Radicals (PPR). The PL was opposed of the participation of the PSP in this coalition, which eventually led to a split between PL and the PSP in 1972.

=== From Proletarian Left to Socialist Workers Party ===
The PL decided to form a new openly Trotskyist "revolutionary workers' vanguard party". At this point the PL had about 300 members. The party was originally called Communist League-Proletarian Left (Dutch: Kommunistenbond- Proletarisch Links, KB-PL). In 1974 the party changed its name to International Communist League (Dutch: Internationale Kommunistenbond, IKB) and formally re-affiliated with the Fourth International. In response to the change in course of the Fourth International, which with the 'turn to industry' wanted to focus more on the organizing of industrial workers the IKB again changed its name to the Socialist Workers Party (Dutch: Socialistische Arbeiderspartij) in 1983.

In the late 1980s the entire Dutch non-social democratic left was in decline. This caused a major push for left unity, which eventually led to the Communist Party of the Netherlands (CPN), the PSP, the PPR and the non-parliamentary Evangelical People's Party (EVP) to at first form a common election list and later merged to form a new political party: GreenLeft. The SAP was excluded from these unity talks.

=== Crisis and regroupment ===
In the early 2000s the SAP discussed multiple strategies to regain relevance. Attempts to merge with the International Socialists (IS) did not succeed and many member left the organization to join other leftwing parties. Membership numbers dwindled to about 40. It was decided that the group could no longer consider itself a 'party' and therefore was renamed Socialist Alternative Politics (Dutch: Socialistische Alternatieve Politiek). The paper version of their magazine Grenzeloos (Borderless) was canceled in 2013.

The SAP published a newspaper Klassenstrijd which in 1992 was renamed to Grenzeloos. The SAP also for a time had an affiliated youth wing called Rebel. Rebel fizzled out in the late 1990s.

== Activities ==
Members of the SAP are active in the trade union Federatie Nederlandse Vakbeweging (FNV) and contribute to the International Institute for Research and Education (IIRE) which is based in Amsterdam. Many of its members are also active within the Socialist Party (SP), although not in an entryist fashion. For instance Leo de Kleijn was a SAP member who was a city council member for the SP in Rotterdam.

== Elections ==
The IKB/SAP occasionally participated in elections, although it never managed to win seats on its own. At the local level it often sought coalitions with other leftwing groups, for instance PSP, SP and The Greens, through which SAP members were elected to city council in among others Deventer and Amsterdam. The SAP as an organization no longer participates in elections, although individual member still run as candidates for other parties.

Tweede Kamer
Year	Name	Votes	%
1981	IKB	1,814	0,02
1986	SAP	3,634	0,04
1989	SAP	4,297	0,04
1994	SAP-Rebel	4,347	0,05

Provinciale Staten
Provincie	Votes	%
1987 Provinciale Staten Elections
Overijssel	109	0,02%
Gelderland	161	0,02%
North Holland	860	0,08%
South Holland	1,154	0,08%
North Brabant	899	0,09%
1991 Provinciale Staten Elections
Groningen	439	0,18%
North Brabant	1,013	0,13%
South Holland	1,216	0,13%
Gelderland	678	0,09%
North Holland	986	0,11%
1995 Provinciale Staten Elections
Utrecht	548	0,13%

Gemeenteraden
Gemeente	Votes	%
1982 Local Elections (as IKB)
Rotterdam	108	0,05%
Amsterdam	136	0,05%
1986 Local Elections (as SAP)
Deventer	170	0,46%
Amsterdam	428	0,13%
1990 Local Elections
Amsterdam	577	0,21%
The Hague	254	0,15%
Breda	198	0,41%
Eindhoven	304	0,44%
Nijmegen	340	0,53%
1994 Local Elections
Eindhoven	762	0,88%
Beverwijk	213	1,24%
