= Jan Meulink =

Dutch politician (1917-1999)

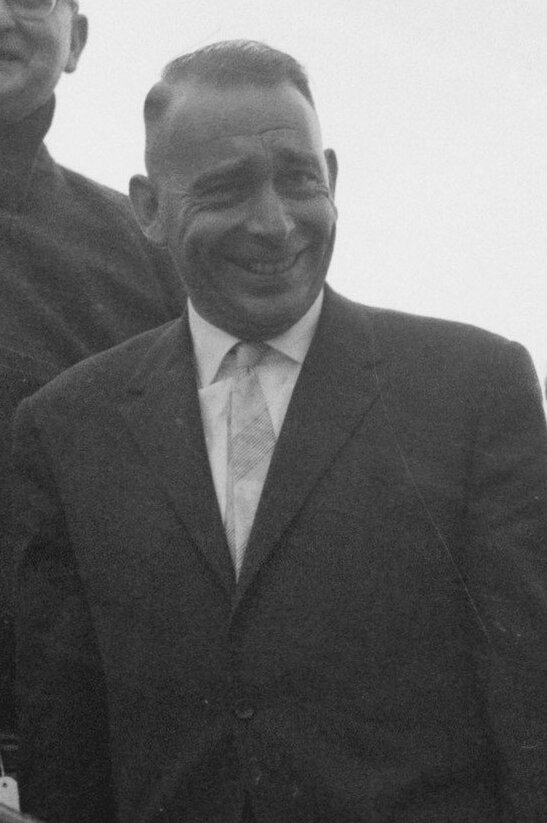
- Jan Meulink in 1961

Personal details
- Born: February 1, 1917 Wolvega, Netherlands
- Died: April 14, 1999 (aged 82) Enschede
- Political party: Anti-Revolutionary Party, Christen-Democratisch Appèl

Jan Meulink was a Dutch lawyer and politician.

== Early life and education ==
Jan Meulink was born on February 1, 1917 in Wolvega, the son of Reverend Hendrik Meulink. His early education was marked by an interest in law and theology, rooted in his Christian upbringing in the Reformed tradition. After completing grammar school, Meulink pursued law at the Free University (VU) in Amsterdam, an institution with a strong Christian foundation, aligning with his ideological beliefs. In 1942, he received his doctorate with the thesis ""De Plaats der Kartels in het Ordeningstreven"" (The Place of Cartels in the Pursuit of Order).

== Legal career ==
During World War II, Meulink's career took a significant turn as he became involved in prosecuting wartime collaborators. His most prominent role was as acting fiscal advocate at the Special Court of Appeal in Arnhem, where he was responsible for handling cases against those accused of collaboration with the Nazi regime. One of his notable cases was the prosecution of Herbertus Bikker, known as the "Executioner of Ommen," for war crimes committed during the Nazi occupation. After the war, Meulink founded a law firm in 1948 alongside Jan Leppink in Enschede.

== Political career ==
Meulink's political journey began locally, where he served as a member of the municipal council in Enschede in 1949. His affiliation with the ARP (Anti-Revolutionary Party), a Christian-democratic party, aligned with his personal religious beliefs. Over the years, his work in the council helped him establish himself in local governance. In 1956, Meulink entered national politics, being elected to the Dutch House of Representatives (Tweede Kamer) as a representative of the ARP. His strong opposition to the transfer of Dutch New Guinea to Indonesia in 1962. Meulink believed that relinquishing the territory would harm Dutch interests and the local population. Despite facing criticism from within his party for this stance, Meulink's principled position won him significant preferential votes in the next election, highlighting his popularity with voters who shared his views. Meulink remained in parliament until 1966, during which time he worked on various legislative initiatives, particularly in the areas of public governance, economic regulation, and justice. In 1965, Meulink transitioned to regional politics, becoming a member of the Provincial Executive in Overijssel. Over the course of his 16-year tenure, he held the portfolio for Transport, Public Works, and Water Management. In this role, he was involved with developing infrastructure projects, and addressing transportation networks and public amenities such as water management. From 1983 to 1987, he served as chairman of the Evangelische Omroep (EO), a Christian broadcasting organization in the Netherlands.

== Death ==
Jan Meulink died on April 14, 1999 in Enschede.

== See also ==
- Anti-Revolutionary Party
- Evangelische Omroep
- Politics of the Netherlands
