= Andrée van Es =

Dutch politician

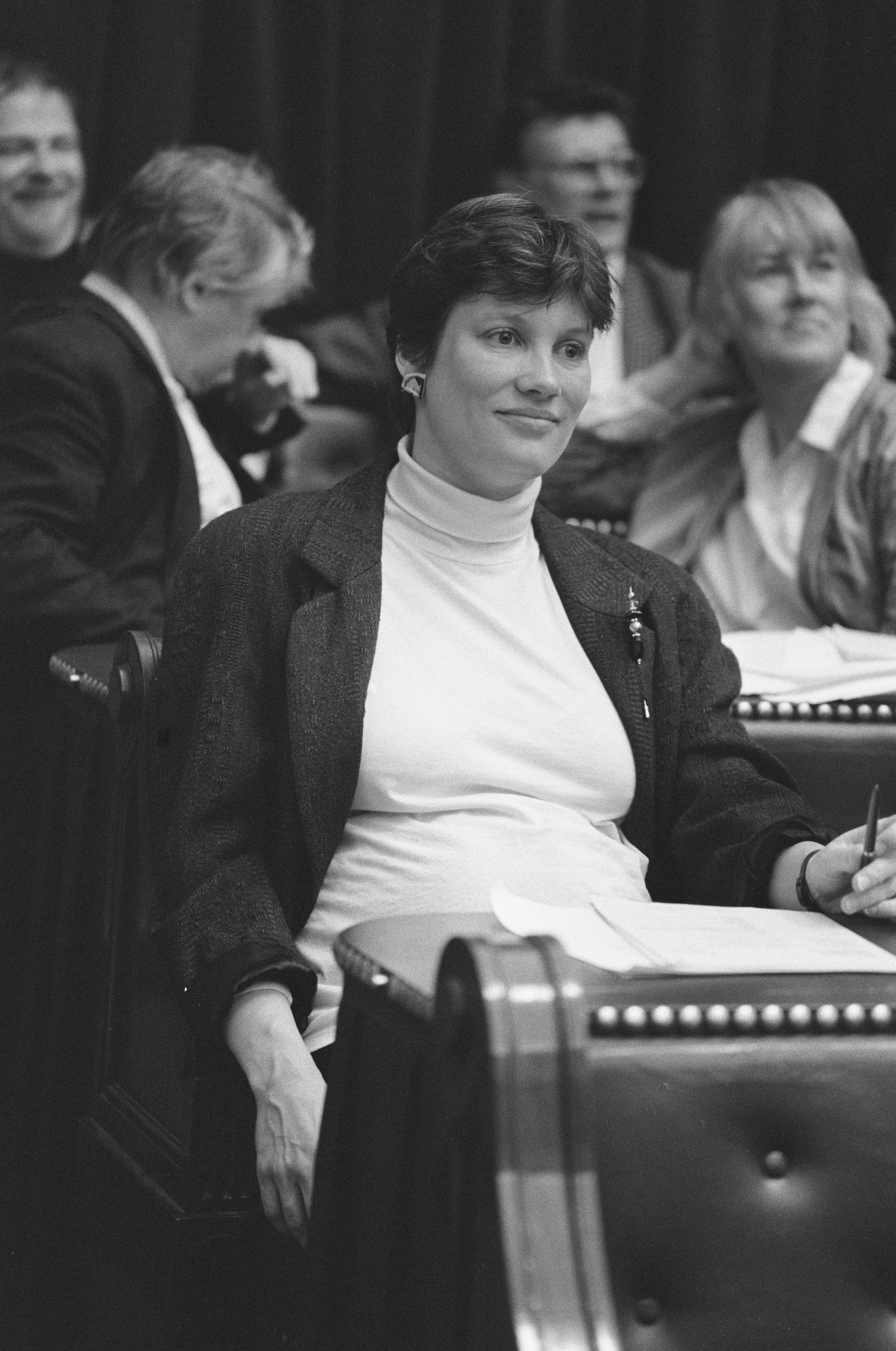
Andrée van Es

Andrée Christine van Es (born 26 January 1953 in The Hague) is a Dutch politician. She is currently chairwoman of the Dutch national UNESCO committee. She was previously wethouder (alderman) in the executive of the city of Amsterdam for GreenLeft until 2014. She was member of the House of Representatives for the Pacifist Socialist Party and GreenLeft.

== Biography ==
Van Es became assistant to the PSP parliamentary party in 1975. During the 1981 election she was elected to parliament. From 1985 she was chair of the parliamentary party, which after the 1986 election was represented only by her. In the 1989 election, the PSP combined forces with the Communist Party of the Netherlands and the progressive Christian Political Party of Radicals and the Evangelical People's Party under the name GreenLeft. In November 1990, just before GreenLeft was formed as a separate political party, Van Es left politics in order to "make room for new GreenLeft faces" and because she had difficulty combining motherhood and her place in parliament. She was a consciously single mother from 1988. She was replaced as an MP by party member Leoni Sipkes.

After her political career, Van Es worked for the broadcasters VPRO and NOS. In 1996 she married MP Maarten van Traa, with whom she had had a relationship since 1990. In October 1997, Van Traa died during a car crash. After her journalist work, Van Es led the political-cultural centre De Balie in Amsterdam and chaired the GGZ-Netherlands, a health organization, between 2002 and 2007. In 2001 she was asked by the cabinet to help Máxima Zorreguieta, then the future wife of Willem-Alexander, Prince of Orange, integrate in the Dutch society. Between 2002 and 2004 she was a member of the Dijkstal committee, which studied the salaries for politicians and high ranking civil servants. She worked from November 2007 as director-general of Government and Kingdom Relations, one of the highest-ranking civil servants within the Ministry of the Interior and Kingdom Relations.

Since April 2010 she has been a member of the executive of the city of Amsterdam responsible for, amongst others, work & income and diversity & integration.
