= Piet Burggraaf =

Dutch politician (1931-2019)

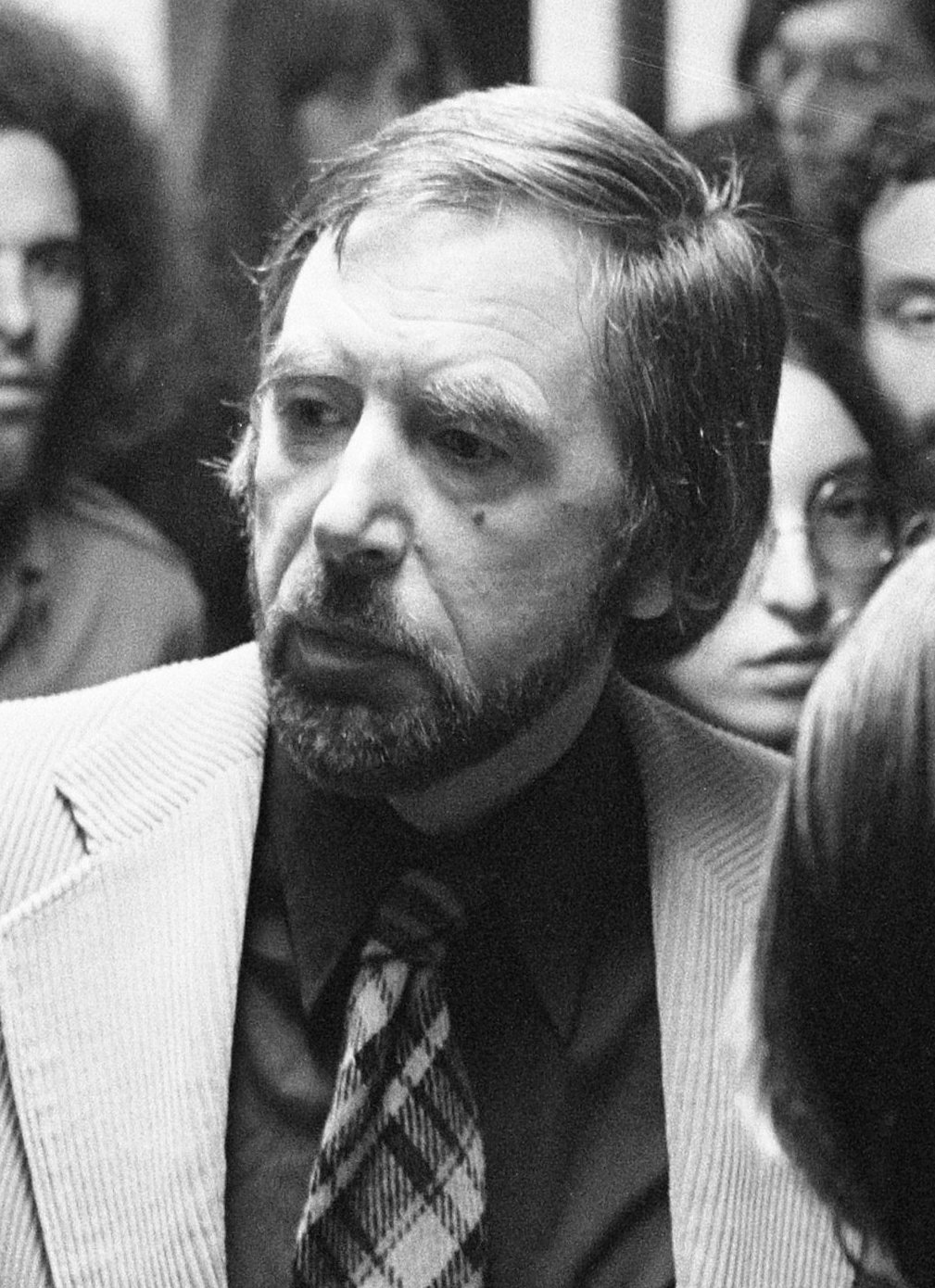
- Piet Burggraaf in 1974

Member of the House of Representatives
- In office 11 December 1963 – 22 February 1967

Personal details
- Born: Pieter Adriaan Burggraaf; 19 October 1931 Alphen aan den Rijn, Netherlands
- Died: 5 January 2019 (aged 87) Groenekan, Netherlands
- Party: PSP (1957-1974); PvdA (1975-1991); GroenLinks (1991-2019)
- Spouse(s): Louisa Bulterman (m. 1953; div. 1974) Louise Margaretha Wilhelmina Hubert (m. 1974; div. 1988) Geertruida Maria Siegerink (m. 2001)
- Children: 5

Pieter Adriaan "Piet" Burggraaf (19 October 1931 – 5 January 2019) was a Dutch politician. He was a member of the Dutch House of Representatives for the Pacifist Socialist Party (PSP) from 1963 to 1967, serving as the PSP's chairman from 1960 to 1963 and from 1969 to 1973. He also served as the chairman of the Association Netherlands-GDR from 1974 to 1990.

== Early life ==
Piet Burggraaf was born on 19 October 1931 into a strict orthodox Reformed Protestant family in Alphen aan den Rijn. In his later life, Burggraaf would abandon his family's orthodox Reformed faith in favour of a more liberal Reformed Protestantism. After dropping out of secondary school due to adjustment issues, Burggraaf became a youth leader in the Christian Young Men's Association. In 1951, he was drafted into the Dutch army as a corporal, but became a conscientious objector soon after. In 1955, Burggraaf completed his teaching exam, becoming a teacher in a poor area of Amsterdam-Noord.

== Political career ==
In the 1950s, Burggraaf became involved with pacifist and left-wing causes, joining the Christian pacifist group Kerk en Vrede (Church and Peace) in 1952 as well as the Socialist Union, which he left due to what he saw as the party's pro-USSR orientation. In 1957, he attended the founding convention of the Pacifist Socialist Party (PSP), and was elected to the Amsterdam municipal council the next year. He left that position in 1960 to become chairman of the PSP.

In 1963, Burggraaf was elected to the House of Representatives for the PSP, resigning the chairmanship of the PSP to take up his seat. As an MP, he focused on socio-economic affairs, education, and culture. In 1967 he left the House of Representatives to become adjunct-director of a training centre in Oosterhesselen.

Within the PSP, Burggraaf was a moderate, who supported cooperation with other leftist parties and were prepared to support a centre-left government of the Labour Party (PvdA), Democrats 66, and the Political Party Radicals (PPR). The year 1969 was marked between conflicts between the moderate faction around Burggraaf, who met in Oosterhesselen and set up talks with the PvdA and PPR to form a united progressive party, and the Marxist-oriented radical wing, which included the Trotskyist faction Proletaries Links (Proletarian Left), which was almost expelled from the PSP in 1971 and chose to leave the party soon after. At a PSP congress in October 1969 a split was avoided narrowly and Burggraaf was elected as party chairman. In 1973, the party leadership under Burggraaf came under attack at an extraordinary party convention, after which he resigned as chairman. The Oosterhesselen group around Burggraaf soon faced accusations from radicals in the party, led by the new chairman Paul Hoogerwerf and PSP parliamentary leader Fred van der Spek, who accused them of sympathising with the USSR, after which Burggraaf and other PSP moderates left the party at the 1974 party convention.

Dissatisfied with the PSP's perceived radicalism, Burggraaf joined the PvdA in 1975, serving as the head of the PvdA in Drenthe from 1979 to 1980. He left the PvdA in 1991 due to its policy on the Iran-Iraq war and welfare cuts, joining GroenLinks, which he would remain a member of until his death.

== Association Netherlands-GDR ==
In 1976, Burggraaf joined the governing board of the Association Netherlands-GDR, an ideologically heterogeneous organisation which sought to improve ties between the Netherlands and East Germany and organised regular visits to the country. In 1979, the association's leader Dick van der Meer was removed under pressure from the East German government due to his interference in the internal politics of the Communist Party of the Netherlands, and Burggraaf became the leader of the organisation. Under Burggraaf's leadership, the Association Netherlands-GDR remained silent on political issues, such as the 1976 expulsion of Wolf Biermann, in order to maintain friendly relations with East Germany's ruling Socialist Unity Party.

In 1989, Burggraaf received personal congratulations from prime minister Ruud Lubbers on the Association Netherlands-GDR's fifteenth anniversary, for contributing to a better understanding between East and West. That same year, a delegation led by Burggraaf was on a visit in East Germany when its leader Erich Honecker was deposed on 18 October, receiving the news before the Dutch embassy in East Berlin did. The organisation quickly went into decline, and on 6 October 1990 the association's remaining members voted to disband it.

Following the demise of the Association Netherlands-GDR, Burggraaf saw the 1989 Peaceful Revolution as a positive, but regretted the reunification of Germany as having ended the possibility of establishing a "new society". In 1990, Burggraaf had denied that the Association Netherlands-GDR was a communist front, and had maintained contacts with opposition "in the margins ". In a 2007 episode of the television programme Andere Tijden, Burggraaf admitted that although the Association Netherlands-GDR had served as a political tool for East Germany, he nevertheless viewed his work through the Association as having contributed to a certain "mindset between different people".

== Later life ==
Outside of politics, Burggraaf occupied various organisational functions throughout the 1970s, including board member of the VPRO from 1970 to 1971, membership of the governing council of the Child Protection Council in Assen from 1970 to 1975 and of the Social Academy 'De Horst' in Driebergen from 1973 to 1978. He was also active in the refugee support charity Stichting Vluchtelingenwerk, as well as several other cultural organisations. Burggraaf was an avid collector of bookplates, and was member of the governing body of the Dutch association of bookplate collectors from 1998 to 2010. He headed the municipal GroenLinks chapter in De Bilt from 2001 to 2005.

Piet Burggraaf died on 5 January 2019 in Groenekan.

== Personal life ==
Piet Burggraaf was married three times. His first marriage was to Louisa Bulterman on 3 October 1953, with whom he had three sons. He divorced her on 29 October 1974, marrying Louise Margaretha Wilhelmina Hubert less than a month later on 22 November, with whom he had one son and divorced on 19 February 1988. His last marriage was to Geertruida Maria Siegerink on 29 August 2001, with whom he was already cohabiting and had one daughter.
