= Theo Joekes =

Dutch journalist, writer and politician

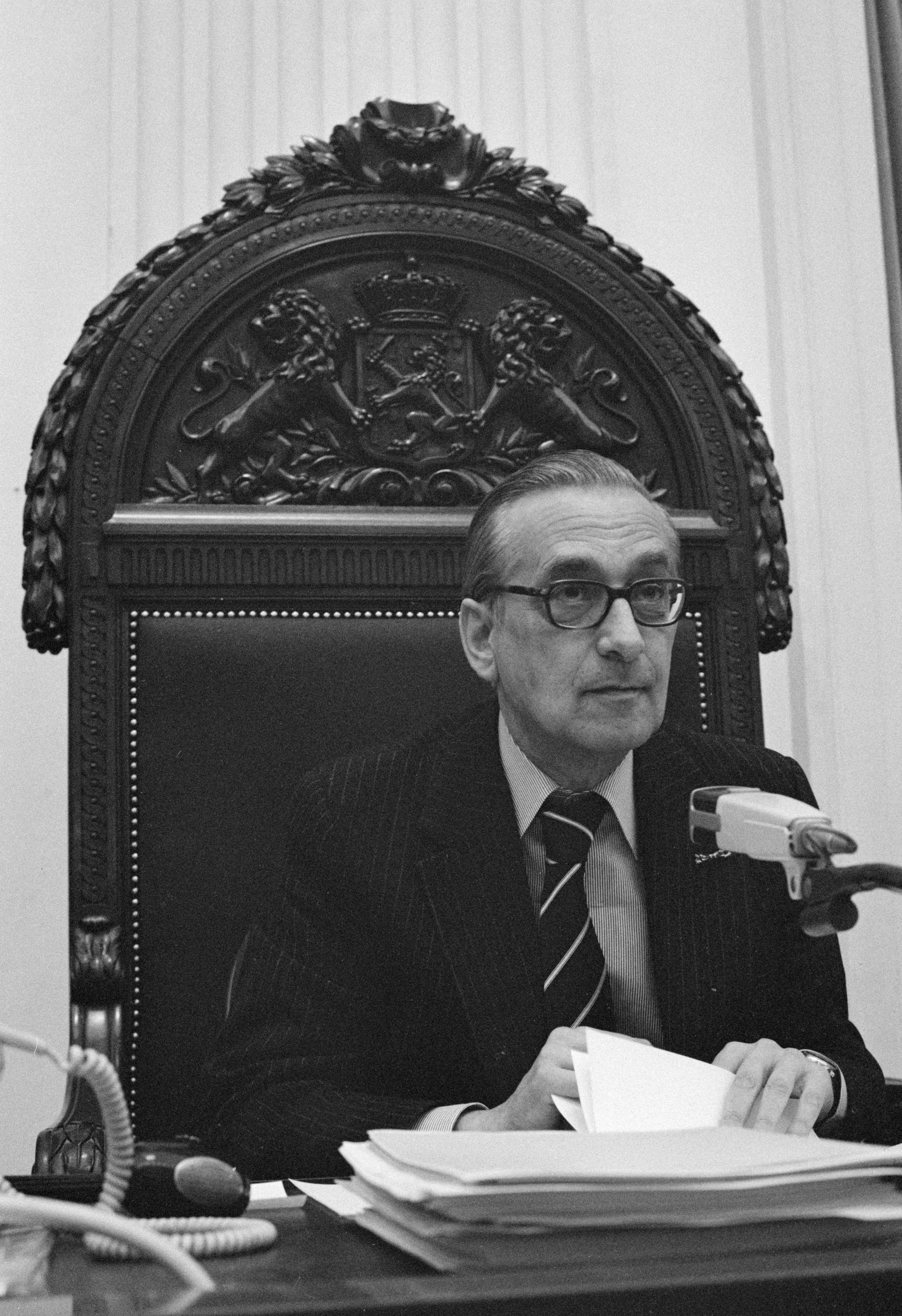
Theo Joekes in 1980

Theodoor Hendrik "Theo" Joekes (1 September 1923, in The Hague – 16 March 1999, in The Hague) was a Dutch journalist, writer and politician.

== Life ==
Joekes was son of PvdA-Minister Adolf Marcus Joekes. He began his career at the BBC and was London correspondent of the newspaper NRC. Later he became correspondent of the Financial Times and The Economist. In 1964 he graduated from the University of Leiden. From 1963 to 1989 he was a member of the House of Representatives of the Netherlands. Because of his independent attitude in the RSV committee he came in conflict with the party leadership, but in 1986 retained his seat when he received over 250,000 preferential votes. In 1989 he retracted himself from the list of candidates for the VVD, after again being placed in an ineligible position.

Joekes suffered from a bipolar disorder with psychosis, for which he received medication from 1973.

== Books ==
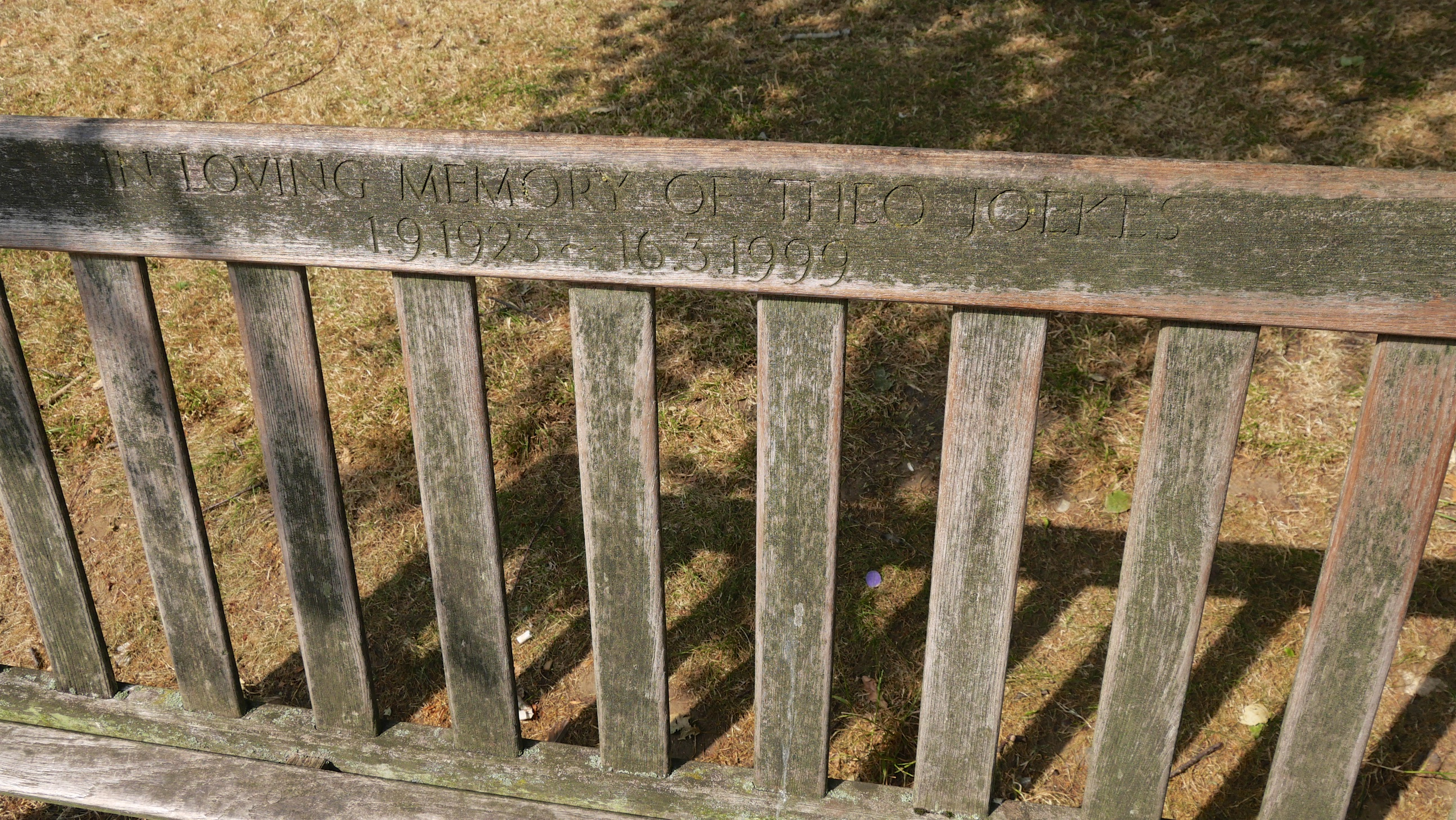
Bench in London, "in loving memory of Theo Joekes"

Radio play for the Dutch section of the BBC:

- Christmas at the South Pole (1948)

Detectives Novels:

- Murder in the Ridderzaal (1980)
- Murder at De Horst (1981)
- Murder at the Voorhout (1981)
- Quintuple murders (1982)
- Clover murder (1986)
