= Bram van der Lek =

Dutch politician and author

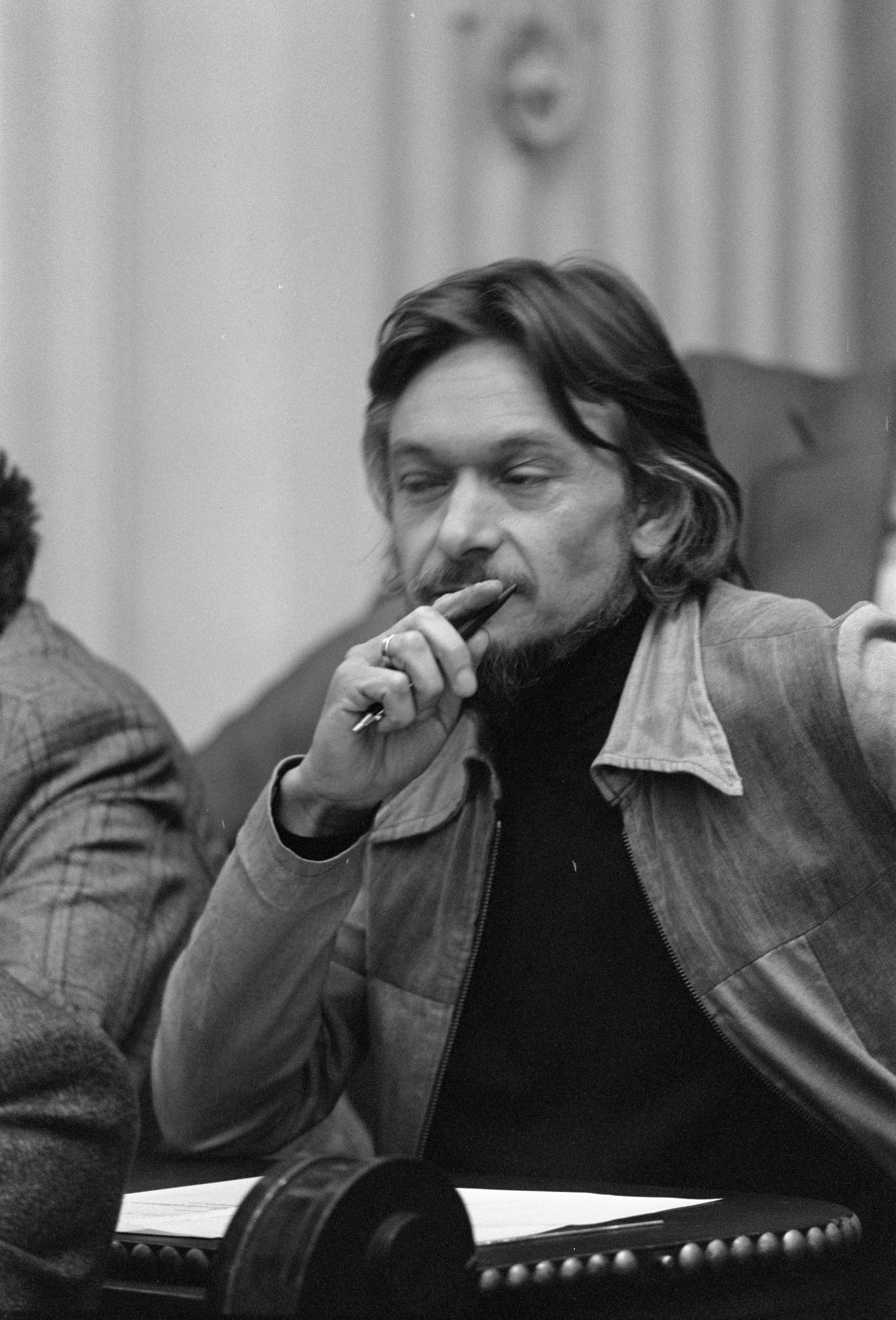
- Bram van der Lek in October 1974

Member of the House of Representatives
- In office 1967–1971
- In office 1972–1978

Member of the Senate
- In office 1983–1984

Member of the European Parliament
- In office 1984–1989
- Constituency: Netherlands

Personal details
- Born: 20 May 1931 Delft
- Died: 29 November 2013 (aged 82) Dieren
- Party: PSP
- Education: University of Utrecht

Bram van der Lek (20 May 1931 – 29 November 2013) was a Dutch politician, biologist and author. Representing the Pacifist Socialist Party, he was a member of the House of Representatives from 1967 until 1971 and from 1972 until 1978 during which he was the PSP's parliamentary leader, the Senate from 1983 until 1984, and the European Parliament from 1984 until 1989. He also wrote a book in 1972, Het Milieuboekje (The Environment Booklet), which was about environmental issues of the time.

== Biography ==
Van der Lek was born in 1931 in Delft. In 1950 he moved to The Hague to complete his secondary education at the Gymnasium Haganum. He then went on to study biology at the University of Utrecht until 1956. Two years after finishing his studies, he joined the PSP. From 1961 to 1967, he worked as a biology teacher at the progressive Kees Boeke school in Bilthoven. He obtained his doctorate from the University of Utrecht in 1967, with a thesis on the effect of light on pigment cells in the skin of tadpoles.

In 1967, Van der Lek was first elected to the House of Representatives, where he would become known for his peculiar personal style, becoming for instance the first person to speak in front of the House of Representatives while wearing a sweater. During the occupation of a facility at Nieuw Dennendal for mentally disabled people by health care workers supporting radical changes in treatment, Van der Lek was arrested during a police action.

He would serve until 1971, when he left office as a result of the PSP's electoral loss in the 1971 Dutch general election and became head of the PSP's scientific institute. In 1972, he succeeded Hans Wiebenga as the PSP's parliamentary leader due to Van der Lek's more youthful appearance, and was again elected to the House of Representatives. As the PSP's leader, he became known as a prominent voice on environmental issues. He also advocated for various other radical political positions, including abolition of the monarchy, demilitarisation, the Dutch police's riot squad, and legalising pedophilia. In 1975, Van der Lek appeared on the television programme Hier en Nu to advocate for legalising child pornography, and stated that he had "no problem" with "children and adults consensually having sex".

Van der Lek was accused of being a spy for the Soviet Union in 1976, after Elsevier magazine had published a story saying that the CIA had implicated an unnamed left-wing MP in a spy ring, named by several regional newspapers as Van der Lek. He successfully sued the newspapers for libel, but after the newspapers appealed he dropped the case due to lack of time and funds.

In the 1977 Dutch general election, the PSP suffered a drastic electoral defeat, being reduced to a single seat in the House of Representatives. The next year, Van der Lek left office and was replaced as party leader by Fred van der Spek. He became party chairman, and was elected to the Senate in 1983, but resigned the next year to become a member of the European Parliament, where he would serve until 1989.

After his retirement, he would remain active in environmental activism, serving as chairman of Milieudefensie, an environmental organisation which he had helped found, from 1993 to 1995. Van der Lek died in Dieren on 29 November 2013.
