= Fred van der Spek =

Dutch politician (1923–2017)

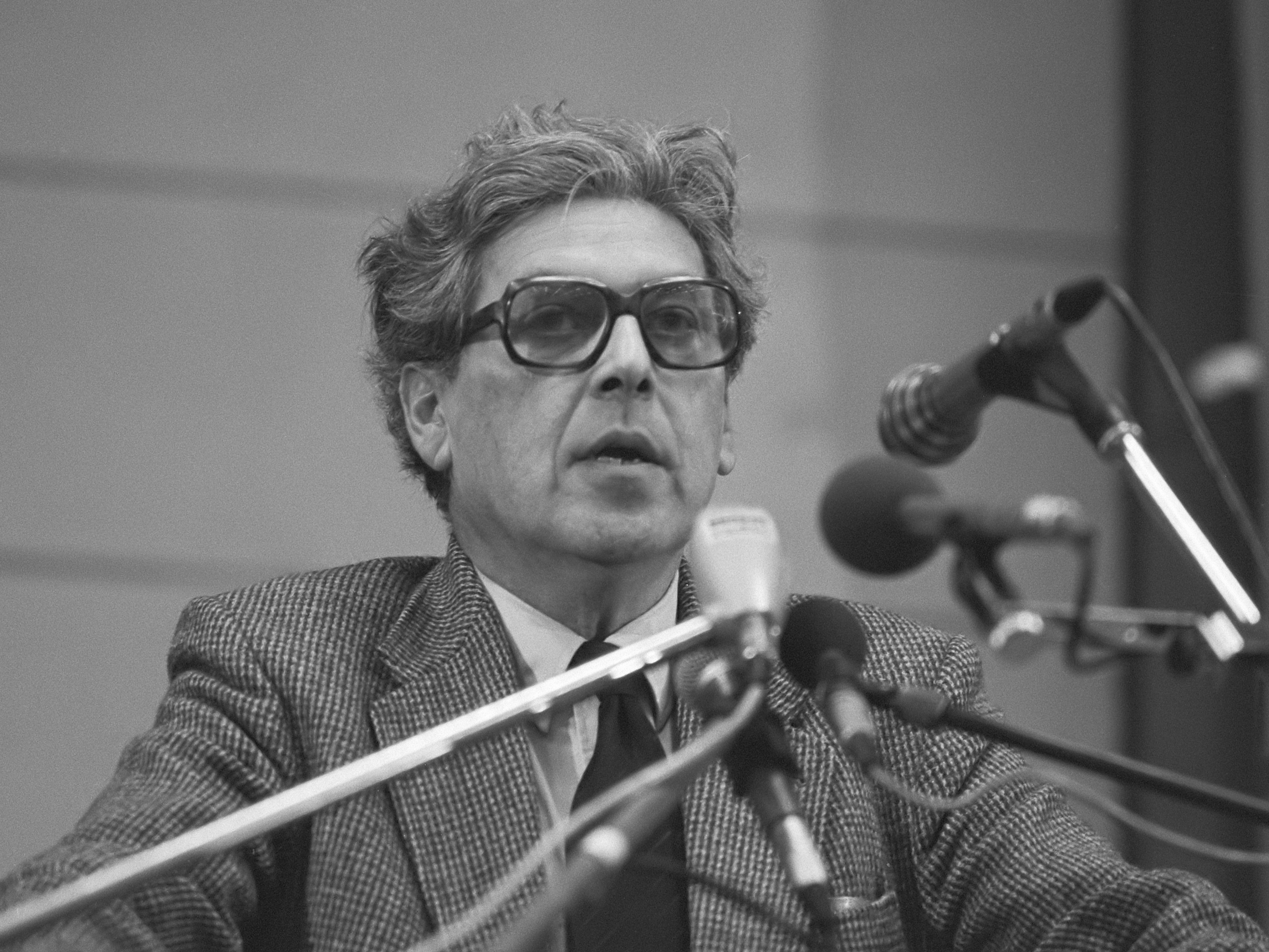
- Fred van der Spek in 1985

Member of the Senate
- In office 5 June 1963 – 21 February 1967

Member of the House of Representatives
- In office 23 February 1967 – 8 June 1977
- In office 16 January 1978 – 3 June 1986

Personal details
- Born: Alfred Gustaaf van der Spek; 13 December 1923 The Hague, Netherlands
- Died: 23 November 2017 (aged 93) Amsterdam, Netherlands
- Party: PSP (1957–1985)
- Spouse: Sara Samuëlla Troost
- Children: 2

Alfred Gustaaf (Fred) van der Spek (13 December 1923 – 23 November 2017) was a Dutch politician. He was a founding member of the Pacifist Socialist Party (PSP), for which he served in the Senate between 1963 and 1967 and in the House of Representatives from 1967 to 1977 and 1978 to 1986, during which he was the PSP's parliamentary leader.

== Early life ==
Fred van der Spek was born on 13 December 1923 in The Hague. He gew up in a social democratic family. His father worked as house painter, tram conductor and usher for the PTT, among various jobs.

Van der Spek attended secondary school starting in 1935 and graduated in 1940. Between 1940 and 1943, he studied physics and chemistry at Delft University of Technology. After refusing to sign a loyalty oath to the German occupiers, he went into hiding in February 1943. Three months later, he complied with the German order to report for the Arbeitseinsatz and was put to work in Germany. After a hospital stay and being allowed to return to the Netherlands on convalescent leave, he went into hiding again. During the war, Van der Spek supported the American bombings of Germany and the atomic bombings of Hiroshima and Nagasaki. Later, he would refer to these actions as war crimes.

Around 1946–1947, Van der Spek came into contact with Professor Léon Rosenfeld of the Association of Scientific Researchers, a movement of antimilitarist, socialist scientists. Inspired by a lecture by Rosenfeld, Van der Spek became a staunch antimilitarist. Rosenfeld linked socialism to the opposition to nuclear weapons, as Van der Spek would later do as well. Van der Spek joined the at the time marginal peace movement, and joined the left-wing Socialist Union (Socialistische Unie) in 1950.

Starting in 1949, Van der Spek taught physics and chemistry at a secondary school in Brielle and then for a few months at the Grotius Lyceum in The Hague. He then taught physics and chemistry at the Baarnsch Lyceum in Baarn from 1953 to 1967, where he taught Princess Christina of the Netherlands.

== Political career ==
From 1950 to 1953, Van der Spek was a member of the Socialist Union, and in 1957 he became one of the founders of the Pacifist Socialist Party. He served on the PSP's executive committee from 1957 to 1959.

In 1963, Van der Spek was elected to the Senate for the PSP. In the Senate, he became his party's leader. In the 1967 Dutch general election, he was first elected to the House of Representatives. In the House of Representatives, Van der Spek spoke primarily on foreign affairs, development cooperation, and defense.

Van der Spek was one of the most prominent faces of the PSP. He was known as an erudite and sharp debater, but also as straightforward and sarcastic. He belonged to the wing of the PSP that placed a stronger emphasis on socialism than on pacifism. He was a fervent anti-capitalist, having once proposed a legal ban on entrepreneurship punishable by jail time. Van der Spek was also opposed to far-reaching cooperation with other progressive parties, such as the Labour Party (PvdA), the Political Party of Radicals (PPR), and Democrats 66. Van der Spek, always impeccably dressed in a suit, stood in striking contrast to the mostly young and alternative-looking supporters of the PSP. As a staunch republican, he was the only member of his parliamentary group to refuse, in 1967, to join the House of Representatives in extending congratulations to Princess Beatrix on the birth of Willem-Alexander.

Van der Spek served as a member of the House of Representatives until 1977, when the PSP won only a single seat in that year's general election. When Bram van der Lek, the PSP's sole representative, resigned from the House in 1978, Van der Spek succeeded him. From that point on, he served as the PSP's parliamentary leader. On 30 April 1980, he boycotted Queen Beatrix's coronation due to his republican views. In the 1981 Dutch general election, Van der Spek was the party's lead candidate, and the party won two seats. In the 1982 Dutch general election, he again served as lead candidate, with the PSP winning three seats.

In December 1985, Van der Spek left the PSP after the party convention elected Andrée van Es as the PSP's party leader by a narrow majority. Behind Van Es's election lay a power struggle within the PSP between those who, like Van der Spek, advocated an independent course, and those who wanted to collaborate with other left-wing parties in a green-left bloc. With Van Es's election, the PSP opted for cooperation with the Political Party of Radicals (PPR) and the Communist Party of the Netherlands (CPN), which would ultimately lead to the formation of GroenLinks. Van der Spek formed a separate group in the House of Representatives and became the leader of the Party for Socialism and Disarmament (PSO), which ultimately succumbed to internal conflicts before the 1986 Dutch general election.

== Later life ==
In 1992, Van der Spek joined the PSP'92, a successor to the PSP, founded by PSP members who opposed the formation of GroenLinks, but which also failed to achieve electoral success. Van der Spek's later political activity was limited to occasionally attending the party's local chapter meetings.

In a 2003 interview, Van der Spek looked back on his political career and noted with sadness, that “a large part of that old PSP ideology would soon die along with him.” In GroenLinks' party leadership he saw nothing that resembled his own ideas, nor did he see a true socialist alternative in the Socialist Party.

Van der Spek died on 23 November 2017 in Amsterdam.
