= Hannie Singer-Dekker =

Dutch politician

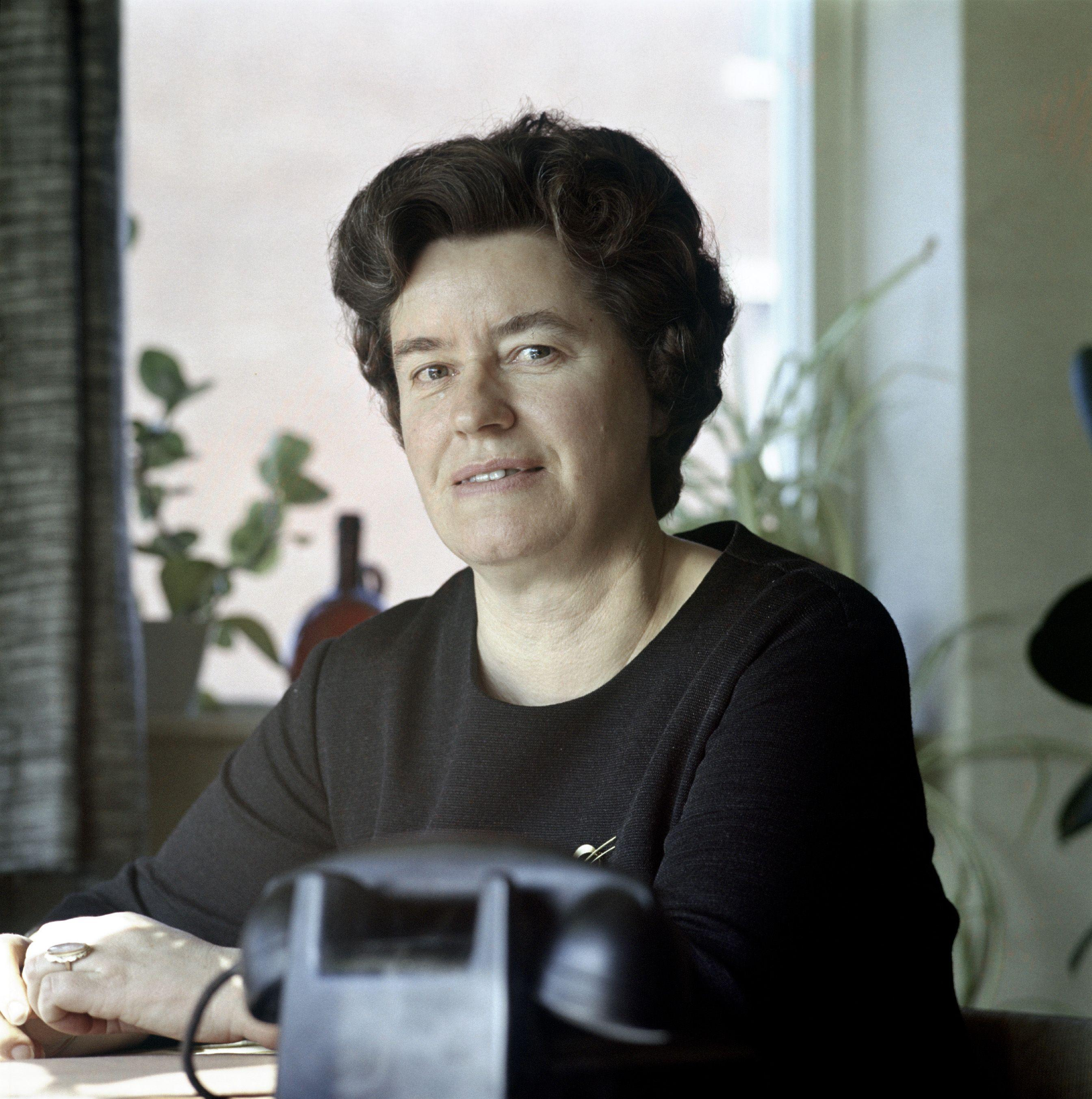
Hannie Singer-Dekker in 1966

Hannie Singer-Dekker (1 October 1917, The Hague – 4 April 2007, Haren (Groningen)) was a Dutch politician.
