= Wim Meijer (Pacifist Socialist Party) =

Dutch politician

Wim Meijer (1923 – 2001) was a Dutch politician and a member of the Pacifist Socialist Party (PSP).
