= Nico van der Veen =

Dutch politician (1916-1962)

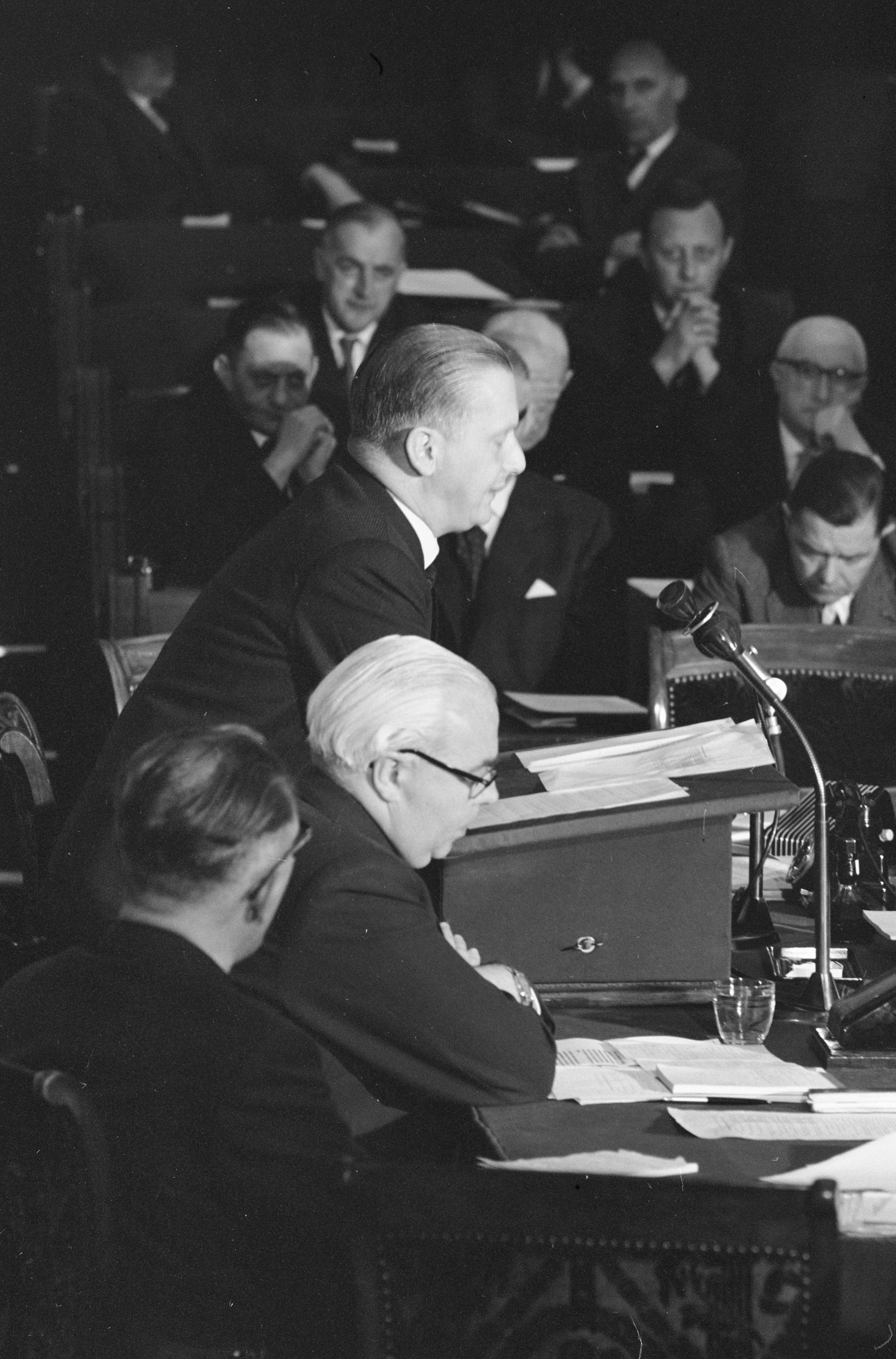
- Nico van der Veen in 1961

Member of the House of Representatives
- In office 11 March 1959 – 20 April 1962

Personal details
- Born: Nicolaas van der Veen; 18 June 1916 Utrecht, Netherlands
- Died: 20 April 1962 (aged 45) Zaandam, Netherlands
- Party: SDAP (1934-1946); PvdA (1946-1947, 1955-1957); PSP (1957-1962)
- Spouse: Johanna Woelders (m. 1939)
- Education: Leiden University

Nicolaas (Nico) van der Veen (18 June 1916 – 20 April 1962) was a Dutch Reformed minister and politician. He was a member of the House of Representatives from 1959 to 1962 for the Pacifist Socialist Party (PSP), serving as the PSP's parliamentary leader during that period.

== Early life ==
Nico van der Veen was born on 18 June 1916 in Utrecht to Jippe van der Veen and Grietje Paulina Ensink. His parents separated when he was young, and he would only get to know his father at the age of 23. Van der Veen was raised by his mother and his stepfather, the former secretary of Pieter Jelles Troelstra, both of whom were members of the Social Democratic Workers' Party (SDAP).

At the age of 18, Van der Veen joined the SDAP. Van der Veen initially studied electrical engineering at the Delft University of Technology, but after his conversion to Christianity he quit his studies in Delft and subsequently began studying theology at Leiden University to become a minister.

== World War II ==
During the Second World War, Van der Veen was unable to continue his studies in Leiden, as the university was shut down in late 1940 by the German occupiers following a speech by Rudolph Cleveringa protesting the dismissal of Jewish professors. He attempted to continue his studies at the University of Groningen but was unsuccessful, and became a religion teacher instead.

During the war, he also participated in the Dutch resistance. Through an old acquaintance, Jan Meulenbelt, Van der Veen and his wife became involved with the Utrecht Children's Committee, a student network that provided assistance to Jewish children. Van der Veen's hometown of The Hague had nearly fifteen thousand Jewish inhabitants, and Meulenbelt was urgently looking for someone who could set up an operation there. Van der Veen arranged hiding places, ration coupons, and false identity papers for dozens of Jewish children.

At the request of his stepfather, with whom his mother had remarried after the death of her previous husband, the minister Marie Cornelis Van Wijhe, Van der Veen moved to Vught in May 1943 to set up youth work within the church there. He helped the Utrecht Children's Centre secure a location in Esch that could serve as a safe house to temporarily shelter Jewish children. The couple responsible for the safe house, a certain Dirk de Ruiter and Mies van Ginkel, turned out to be working for the Sicherheitsdienst. The decision was made to liquidate both individuals, but only De Ruiter was killed; Van Ginkel managed to escape. Several resistance members fell into German hands, and Reverend Van Wijhe had to go into hiding. Van der Veen was imprisoned in 's-Hertogenbosch, but was released after six weeks. He then replaced his stepfather as minister until October 1944, when North Brabant was liberated and he became the head of political investigation for the military authorities in Vught.

After the war, he became a chaplain for the Red Cross, caring for Dutch forced labourers in Germany and Austria in late 1945. He then finished his studies in Leiden and became an assistant minister in Heenvliet and from 1952 in Westzaan. He was a principled socialist minister, a member of the AJC, and for a short time a member of the Labour Party (PvdA) from 1946 to 1947, when he resigned from the party due to his opposition to the first police action in Indonesia. In 1955, he rejoined the PvdA as a member of the Social Democratic Center, an internal pressure group. He left the PvdA in 1957 however to join the newly formed Pacifist Socialist Party (PSP). In addition, he was a part-time teacher of religious history at a secondary school in Zaandam.

== Political career ==
In the 1959 Dutch general election, he became the lead candidate and the first parliamentary party leader of the PSP in the House of Representatives. He strongly opposed the existence of the Domestic Security Service (Binnenlandse Veiligheidsdienst) (BVD), which he called an undemocratic institution and a great danger to human freedoms. As an MP, his principled pacifism drew the ire of both committed Atlanticists in the PvdA as well as the pro-USSR Communist Party of the Netherlands (CPN), who Van der Veen opposed as incompatible with human dignity, though he disagreed with other anti-Communists on the best means of combating Communism, which he considered was best fought with disarmament and government redistribution. He additionally participated in marches protesting the sending of troops to Dutch New Guinea and nuclear proliferation.

Nico van der Veen died in 1962 at the age of 45 from cancer.
