= Henk Lankhorst =

Dutch politician (1914-1976)

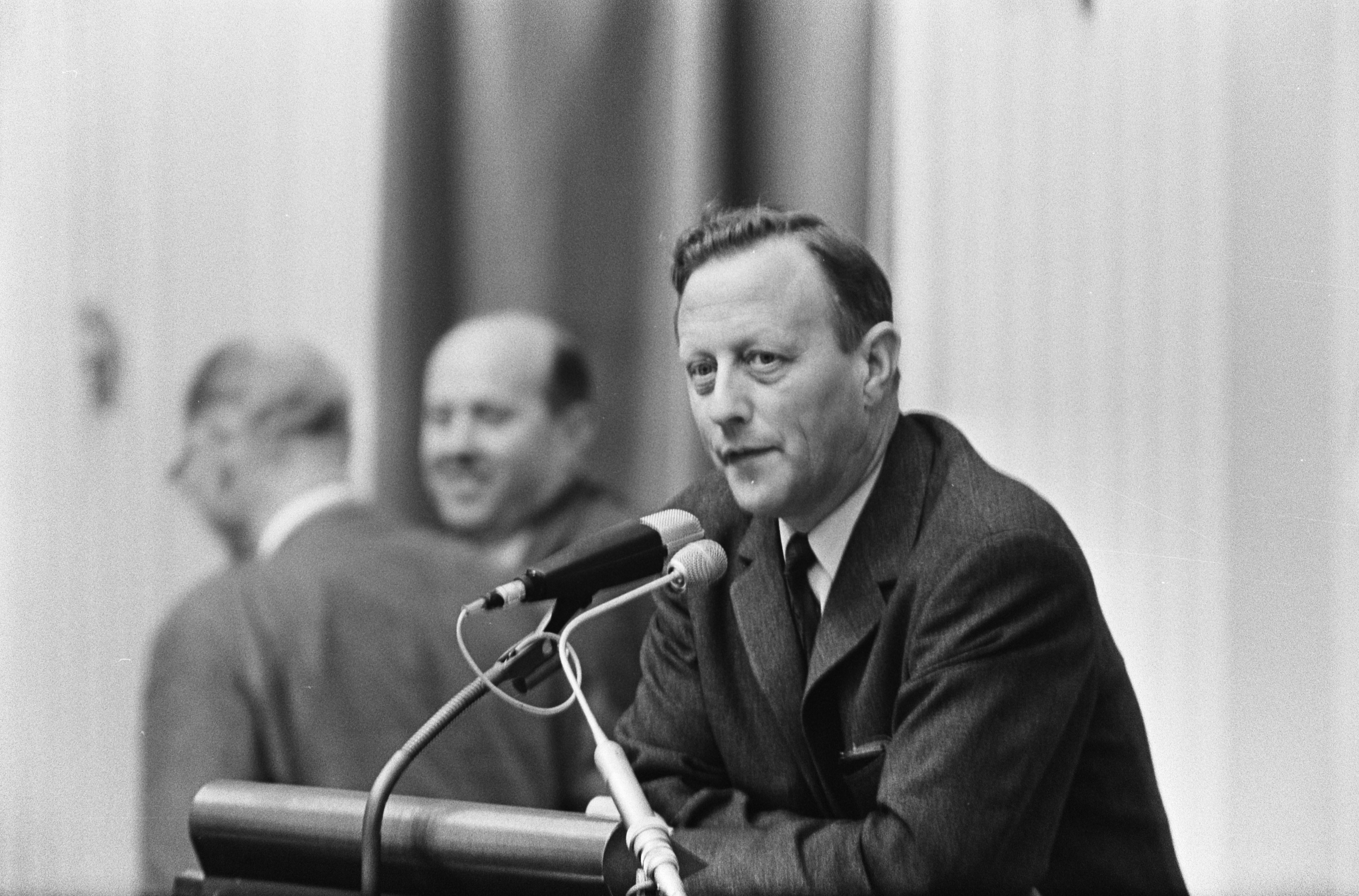
- Henk Lankhorst in 1967

Member of the House of Representatives
- In office 20 March 1959 – 1 June 1969

Member of the Senate
- In office 16 September 1969 – 10 May 1971

Personal details
- Born: Hendrik Johannes Lankhorst; 18 April 1914 Amsterdam, Netherlands
- Died: 24 May 1976 (aged 62) Amsterdam, Netherlands
- Party: CDU (1932–1946); Christian Democratic People's Party (1945–1946); Socialist Union (1950–1955); PSP (1957–1976)
- Spouse(s): Elisabeth vom Hagen (m. 1937; div. 1940) Johanna Cornelia "Jopie" Roolker (m. 1941)

Hendrik Johannes "Henk" Lankhorst (18 April 1914 – 24 May 1976) was a Dutch politician who was a founding member of the Pacifist Socialist Party (PSP). He was a member of the House of Representatives from 1959 to 1969, serving as the PSP's parliamentary leader from 1962, and a member of the Senate from 1969 to 1971.

== Early life ==
Henk Lankhorst was born on 18 April 1914 into a poor family in Amsterdam, the youngest of seven children by 20 years. Lankhorst had a secular upbringing, but was introduced to Christianity at the Christelijke Jonge Mannen-Vereeniging, eventually joining the Dutch Reformed Church. His faith led him to become a pacifist, and in 1932 he joined the Christian Democratic Union (CDU), a party of the Christian left.

After World War II, the CDU decided to merge with the Free-thinking Democratic League (VDB) and Social Democratic Workers' Party (SDAP) to form the Labour Party (PvdA). Lankhorst opposed the merger, and along with other opponents he formed the Christian Democratic People's Party in 1946, which participated in the 1946 provincial elections, but won no seats. Throughout the early 1950s, Lankhorst became involved with the Socialist Union (Dutch: Socialistische Unie), having joined in 1950 but leaving in 1955 due to perceived authoritarianism in party leadership.

== Political career ==
In 1957, Lankhorst participated in the founding of the Pacifist Socialist Party (PSP). Lankhorst was first elected to the House of Representatives in the 1959 Dutch general election, having headed the PSP list in every province except North Holland, where PSP members had thought him not combative enough and had chosen Nico van der Veen, who became the PSP's parliamentary leader, to head the party list there instead. In 1962, Lankhorst succeeded Nico van der Veen as parliamentary leader. As an MP, he primarily focused on defence policy and housing, and initially faced much criticism from other parties on account of his pacifism, even as many within the PSP considered him too moderate. He would however become a more prominent voice within the House of Representatives, despite the PSP's small size. In 1969, Lankhorst left the House of Representatives due to health issues related to overwork.

That same year, he became a member of the Senate. He was almost passed over as a result of several PSP members of the Provincial Council of North Holland voting for fellow PSP member Dik Noordewier, but after Noordewier refused to take up his seat Lankhorst was elected instead, going on to serve until 1971. After leaving the Senate, he would continue to serve in various administrative functions within the PSP, but resigned in 1974 due to his concerns over what he viewed party's lack of focus on pacifism and the weakening of internal party democracy.

Lankhorst died on 24 May 1976 in Amsterdam.
