= Pacifist Socialist Party =

Pacifist Socialist Party Pacifistisch Socialistische Partij
- Abbreviation: PSP
- Leader: Nico van der Veen (1957–1960); Henk Lankhorst (1960–1969); Hans Wiebenga (1969–1972); Bram van der Lek (1972–1978); Fred van der Spek (1978–1985); Andrée van Es (1985–1991)
- Founded: 27 January 1957
- Dissolved: 1 July 1991
- Merged into: GroenLinks
- Headquarters: Bloemgracht 55, Amsterdam (1960–1968); Kerkstraat 445 (1968–1979); Nieuwe Looierstraat 45 (1979–1991)
- Ideology: Democratic socialism Eco-socialism; Pacifism
- Political position: Left-wing
- European Parliament group: Grael
- Colours: Red (official); Pink (customary)

The Pacifist Socialist Party (Dutch: Pacifistisch Socialistische Partij, PSP) was a democratic socialist political party in the Netherlands. It is one of the predecessors of GroenLinks.

== Party history ==
=== Before 1957 ===
In 1955, a group of "politically homeless" activists had formed. The group mainly consisted of former members of the Labour Party (PvdA) and the Communist Party of the Netherlands (CPN). They had left the PvdA over the military intervention against the Indonesian independence movement and the Labour party's support for NATO. Many of them had a background in the orthodox Marxist wing of the Social Democratic Workers' Party or the Christian Democratic Union (CDU), which had merged into the PvdA. The former members of the CPN had left their party over the Stalinist course of the CPN. There was also a group of these politically homeless that had never been members of parties, while others had been member of pre-war parties such as the Independent Socialist Party.

These politically homeless individuals were a diverse group: progressive Christians, orthodox Marxists, Trotskyists, liberal pacifists and some anarchists. Many of them were active in the developing peace movement.

The party was sceptic of both the Eastern bloc and Western bloc. They were oriented at a third camp between Stalinist communism and western capitalism.

In 1956, the group asked the PvdA to put two candidates of these politically homeless on their list for the next elections, one on a 'safe' electable position on their candidate list and one that would need to be elected by preference votes. These candidates would have an independent position in parliament. The PvdA, although originally sympathetic to the idea rejected this. Thus the group felt forced to found its own party and it founded the Action group for the formation of a Party on Anti-militarist and Socialist principles in November 1956. It would chart the possibilities of a new political party.

=== 1957–1971 ===
1963 poster with the slogan "Socialism without the atomic bomb"

On 26 January 1957, the PSP was founded by the Action group. The first year was devoted to the organisation of the party and the preparation for the elections which were expected to be in 1960. The party sought to expand its membership, its branches and its electoral support. The founders were joined by members of the Socialist Union, a group which had split unsuccessfully from the PvdA in 1950. In 1958, it entered in the provincial elections and it won two seats in the North Holland provincial legislative. In the 1959 elections the party won two seats in the House of Representatives.

In the early years, the party became known for its parliamentary and extra-parliamentary opposition against the rising Cold War, and especially the placement of nuclear weapons. The socialist revolution in Cuba and uprisings against the South African system of Apartheid led to considerable debate within the party between groups who opposed all violence and groups who opposed repressive violence (from the ruling class) and supported liberating violence (against the ruling class). In 1961, the party threw off its principled pacifism and advocated the minimization of violence. Extra-parliamentary action against colonialism also became more important; the party supported New Guinean and Algerian independence.

In the 1963 elections, the party performed particularly well. It doubled its seats to four. This success can be attributed to several developments: the rising opposition to the Cold War, the party's appeal to the developing students' movement and especially the anarchist Provo movement, for whom the PSP was the only acceptable party, and finally the CPN's internal conflicts – in 1958 three MPs had left the CPN and formed their own parliamentary party, led by Henk Gortzak, called the Bridge Group (Dutch: Brug-groep) and unsuccessfully competed in the 1959 elections. The group subsequently founded the Socialist Workers' Party (Dutch: Socialist Werkerspartij; SWP). This internal dissent had caused the CPN to fall to only one seat in the 1963 elections.

In the mid-1960s, the Vietnam War became an important issue. The PSP was heavily involved in opposition against the American intervention. It was the first party to pay attention to the war and it was involved in the organisation of demonstrations, rallies and teach ins. The monarchy also became an issue as Crown Princess Beatrix would marry Claus von Amsberg in 1966. The PSP used this opportunity to voice its support for a republican constitution. In the same year the CPN-dissenters of the SWP joined the PSP. The PSP held on to its four seats in the 1967 election. In 1969 Gortzak, previously leader of the SWP returned as MP: now for the PSP.

=== 1971–1981 ===
Famous and controversial 1971 election poster, reading "Disarming"

The 1970s were characterized by internal conflicts between moderate and more radical members of the PSP. The most important reason for this was the radicalization within the PvdA. A new, more radical, generation had gained power in the PvdA. They wanted to form a majority cabinet with only leftwing parties. To achieve this they formed the Progressive Accord with the new left-liberal Democrats 66 and the progressive Christian PPR. The PSP also participated in these talks but broke off, because the majority of the PSP congress thought this alliance was neither pacifist nor socialist. The cooperative minority clashed strongly with the isolationist majority. In the 1971 elections, the party lost two of its four seats, while the PvdA won seats.

In 1972, the party's political leader, Hans Wiebenga (1917–2005) was replaced by the younger Bram van der Lek, who emphasized the environment as an important issue. He was unable to win seats in the 1972 elections. As party leader he would embrace extra-parliamentary protest of all kinds of groups: the PSP was involved in the nascent environmental, squatting, women's and students' movements.

Both the moderates and the most radicals left the party. Until 1974, a Trotskyist group, the Proletarian Left, led by Erik Meijer, now MEP for the Socialist Party operated within the party because they wanted to use the PSP to electrify the masses. In 1974 nearly all of them (except for their leader Meijer) left the party to found what later became the group Socialist Alternative Politics. In 1975 the moderate so called progressive cooperatives left the party. Many members of them joined the PvdA.

Starting in 1975, the party membership exhibited strong growth and doubled in the next five years. Nevertheless, the 1977 elections were disastrous: the party lost all but one seat – this is attributed to the political competition between the social-democratic prime minister Joop den Uyl and his Christian democratic competitor Dries van Agt, which caused many PSP-sympathizers to vote for Den Uyl. The internal dissent within the party also damaged its popular appeal. After one year Van der Lek left parliament, and he was replaced by Fred van der Spek.

=== 1981–1989 ===
In the early 1980s, the placement of American nuclear weapons became an important political issue. The PSP was involved in the organisation of national demonstrations against nuclear weapons and more than 80% of the members of the PSP attended one of the two mass protests against the placement nuclear weapons of 1981 and 1983. In the 1981 election the PSP was rewarded for its principled opposition: it won three seats. In the subsequent 1982 election it kept its seats. The party membership nearly reached 10,000 in this period.

Since the 1980s, the party began to cooperate more with the PPR, which had broken with the PvdA, and the CPN, which had destalinized. It cooperated mainly in municipal and provincial elections and legislatures, because a higher percentage of votes is necessary to gain seats in such elections. At the 1984 European Parliament election, the PPR, CPN and PSP formed the Green Progressive Accord that entered with one joint list. They won one seat, which rotated between the PSP and PPR. Party members also met each other in grassroots extraparliamentary protest against nuclear energy and nuclear weapons. The cooperation led to internal conflicts. Before the election of 1986 the CPN and the PPR wanted to form an electoral alliance with the PSP. This led to a crisis within the party: chair of the parliamentary party, Fred van der Spek who opposed cooperation was replaced by the party congress by Andrée van Es, who favoured cooperation. Van der Spek founded his own Party for Socialism and Disarmament (Dutch: Party voor Socialisme en Ontwapening; PSvO). The 1986 PSP congress however still rejected cooperation. In the elections of 1986 nuclear weapons were no longer an issue: the party was left with only one seat. The membership of the party rapidly declined. The pressure to cooperate increased.

=== After 1989 ===
Pacifist-Socialist Party '92 (Dutch: Pacifistisch-Socialistische Partij '92) (PSP'92) logo

In 1989, the PSP initiated talks with the PPR and the CPN. Their initiative was supported by an open letter from members of trade unions, environmental movements and the arts which called for one progressive formation left of the PvdA. After long negotiations, which were pressured by the fall of the Second cabinet Lubbers and the subsequent earlier elections, the party entered in the 1989 elections as part of GreenLeft. Andrée van Es was second on the list. In 1991, the PSP dissolved itself into GreenLeft. In 1992, a group of former PSP-members who had refused to join GreenLeft formed the PSP'92.

The PSP made a considerable mark on GreenLeft, although it has moderated its pacifism and socialism. Especially the progressive, tolerant and non-dogmatic ideals of the PSP still play an important role. MPs Kees Vendrik, Ineke van Gent and Leo Platvoet were active within the party, as was MEP Joost Lagendijk.

== Ideology and issues ==
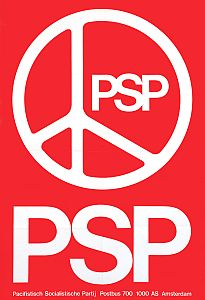

=== Ideology and movement ===
The party's ideology was based on pacifism, socialism, and democracy. These three values were united by human rights. In war, capitalism, and dictatorship human rights are infringed. It was part of the New Left.

In its 1957 manifesto of principles, the PSP advocated two major societal renewals: Firstly, a spiritual renewal, which sought to replace a society based on fear, division and power with a society based on trust, unity and justice – this reflected the party's pacifism. Secondly, an economic renewal, which sought to replace a society based on classes by a classless society. This reflected the party's socialism. The PSP furthermore advocated a democratic political system and a democratic economy, it rejected the use of violence to solve international conflicts and it proposed a federal world state in which wealth would be shared by both the former colonizing powers and their former colonies.

In the 1970s and 1980s, new issues were incorporated into the PSP's ideology: women's liberation, gay rights, and environmentalism.

=== Issues ===
These radical principles are reflected in the party's concern for a democratic socialist economy, a pacifist foreign policy, a directly democratic political system, and a feminization of society.

The PSP advocated a democratic socialist society where government planning and workers' self-management played an important role:

- The party advocated the nationalisation of major parts of the economy, including banks, transport companies, basic industries and construction. These government companies should be controlled by the workers;
- In other economic sectors such as agriculture, should make more use of cooperatives;
- The government has to plan the economic development of the Netherlands and control the development of prices and profits;
- The PSP wanted to attain full employment by decreasing working time, lowering the pensionable age to 60, extending obligatory school attendance to 18 and increasing part time work;
- Through progressive taxation, which would have to be almost 100% after 50,000 euros (then 100,000 guilders), incomes should be made more equal;
- The PSP advocated government ownership of all the land, which could then be rented by companies;
- The party wanted to increase the rights of tenants and squatters and take government action against unoccupied buildings;
- The PSP opposed the use of nuclear energy and advocated investing in alternative energy sources;
- The party wanted to invest in public transport, which would be owned by the government;
- Environmental protection was an important issue for the party. It wanted to put the burden of environmental protection on companies and it opposed direct eco-taxes, which would have a regressive effect.

The PSP advocated an anti-militarist and socialist foreign policy:

- The party opposed the placement of nuclear weapons in the Netherlands;
- The PSP wanted to withdraw from NATO;
- It wanted to dissolve the Dutch army in time: until that time the rights of conscientious objectors should be protected and the Dutch arms industry should be dissolved;
- The party opposed the European Economic Community, which undermined the ability of the government to plan its own economy;
- The PSP advocated increased trade with Second World and Third World countries. Third World countries should also receive more development aid, with fewer restrictions.

On the national level, the party advocated radical democratization of society and protection of civil rights:

- It proposed decentralization of government services and direct democracy at the municipal level;
- The party sought to abolish the Senate and double the number of seats in the House of Representatives;
- The PSP wanted to abolish the position of head of state, and with that the Dutch Monarchy, positions like Queen's Commissioner and mayor should also be abolished;
- It wanted to lower the age limit for voting rights and extend voting rights for migrants;
- The PSP opposed undemocratic institutions, especially when they endangered the civil rights of citizens, it sought to abolish the secret service and private security companies;
- The party wanted to protect the rights of convicts.

The PSP wanted to radically feminize society, liberate other oppressed groups and democratize society:

- The party wanted to better the position of women: it advocated free child care, the legalization of abortion and part time work for both partners. It sought to make social security arrangements individual instead of family oriented;
- It advocated the rights of sexual minorities: equal rights for same-sex partnerships and legalization of transvestism;
- It supported the 1979 petition to lower the age of consent to the age of 12
- The PSP paid special attention to the position of minority cultures and languages in the Netherlands such as West Frisian;
- The party advocated the democratization of schools and universities, better protection of the rights of students, smaller class sizes, and more room for experimentation and alternative education. The party opposed religious schools;
- The PSP sought to ban all casinos and smoking in public buildings on the one side, but it also advocated the legalisation of soft drugs and government controlled supply of hard drugs;
- The party was opposed to any form of discrimination and sought to expand the rights of migrants;
- It sought to legalize of prostitution and increase the protection of prostitutes;
- The PSP favoured individual choice for euthanasia;
- It wanted to democratize hospitals, better protect rights for patients and create one healthcare insurance system for all.

== Representation ==
This table shows the PSP's results in elections to the House of Representatives (HoR), Senate (S), European Parliament (EP), States-Provincial (SP) and municipalities (M), as well as the party's political leadership: the fractievoorzitter is the chair of the parliamentary party and the lijsttrekker is the party's top candidate in the general election. These posts are normally taken by the party's leader. The membership of PSP and the party chair is also represented.

Year	HoR	S	EP	SP	M	Lijsttrekker	Fractievoorzitter	Party Chair	Membership
1957	0	0	n/a	0	0	no elections	extra-parliamentary	Henk van Steenis	858
1958	0	0	n/a	2	17	no elections	extra-parliamentary	Henk van Steenis	1,986
1959	2	0	n/a	2	17	Henk Lankhorst and Nico van der Veen	Nico van der Veen	Hannes de Graaf	2,497
1960	2	0	n/a	2	17	no elections	Nico van der Veen	Piet Burggraaf	2,561
1961	2	0	n/a	2	17	no elections	Nico van der Veen	Piet Burggraaf	2,852
1962	2	0	n/a	13	77	no elections	Henk Lankhorst	Piet Burggraaf	3,624
1963	4	2	n/a	13	77	Henk Lankhorst	Henk Lankhorst	Gerard Slotemaker de Bruïne	3,786
1964	4	2	n/a	13	77	no elections	Henk Lankhorst	Joop Vogt	3,779
1965	4	2	n/a	13	77	no elections	Henk Lankhorst	Hans Wiebenga	3,888
1966	4	3	n/a	24	122	no elections	Henk Lankhorst	Hans Wiebenga	4,857
1967	4	3	n/a	24	122	Henk Lankhorst	Henk Lankhorst	Hans Wiebenga	4,849
1968	4	3	n/a	24	122	no elections	Henk Lankhorst	Hans Wiebenga	4,462
1969	4	3	n/a	24	122	no elections	Hans Wiebenga	Piet Burggraaf	4,325
1970	4	3	n/a	5	30+39 (a)	no elections	Hans Wiebenga	Piet Burggraaf	4,228
1971	2	3	n/a	5	30+39 (a)	Hans Wiebenga	Hans Wiebenga	Piet Burggraaf	4,445
1972	2	1	n/a	5	30+39 (a)	Bram van der Lek	Bram van der Lek	Piet Burggraaf	4,581
1973	2	1	n/a	5	30+39 (a)	no elections	Bram van der Lek	Paul Hoogerwerf	4871
1974	2	0	n/a	4	15+37 (b)	no elections	Bram van der Lek	Paul Hoogerwerf	4,802
1975	2	0	n/a	4	15+37 (b)	no elections	Bram van der Lek	Lambert Meertens	4,333
1976	2	0	n/a	4	15+37 (b)	no elections	Bram van der Lek	Lambert Meertens	4,543
1977	1	1	n/a	4	15+37 (b)	no elections	Bram van der Lek	Lambert Meertens	6,506
1978	1	1	n/a	4	23+18 (b)	no elections	Fred van der Spek	Lambert Meertens	8,797
1979	1	1	0	4	23+18 (b)	no elections	Fred van der Spek	Lambert Meertens	9,018
1980	1	1	0	4	23+18 (b)	no elections	Fred van der Spek	Lambert Meertens	8,703
1981	3	0	0	4	23+18 (b)	Fred van der Spek	Fred van der Spek	Lambert Meertens	9,595
1982	3	0	0	11+7 (b)	40+77 (b)	Fred van der Spek	Fred van der Spek	Bram van der Lek	9,979
1983	3	2	0	11+7 (b)	40+77 (b)	no elections	Fred van der Spek	Marko Mazeland	8,853
1984	3	2	1 (b)	11+7 (b)	40+77 (b)	no elections	Fred van der Spek	Marko Mazeland	7,767
1985	2+1 (c)	2	1 (b)	11+7 (b)	40+77 (b)	no elections	Fred van der Spek	Marko Mazeland	6,450
1986	1	2	1 (b)	11+7 (b)	19+58 (b)	Andrée van Es	Andrée van Es	Saar Boerlage	6,450
1987	1	1	1 (b)	6+9 (b)	19+58 (b)	no elections	Andrée van Es	Saar Boerlage	4,992
1988	1	1	1 (b)	6+9 (b)	19+58 (b)	no elections	Andrée van Es	Saar Boerlage	4,478
1989	2 (d)	1 (d)	0 (d)	17 (d)	77 (d)	Andrée van Es (#2 of GreenLeft)	Andrée van Es (sole MP works with GreenLeft)	Joop Vogt	3,639
1990	2 (d)	1 (d)	0 (d)	17 (d)	77 (d)	Andrée van Es (#2 of the GreenLeft)	no elections	Joop Vogt	3,591

(a): elected on combined PSP/PvdA/PPR lists
(b): elected on combined PSP/CPN, PSP/PPR or PSP/CPN/PPR lists (estimate)
(c): PSvO split from the PSP
(d): cooperating in GreenLeft parliamentary parties.

=== European Parliament ===
Name	Start of term	End of term	Ref.
Bram van der Lek	24 July 1984	24 July 1989	

=== Municipal and Provincial Government ===
The PSP had a provincial stronghold in North Holland, which gave the party more than half of its vote.

It had some municipal strongholds in the Zaanstreek and Amsterdam, but also in some cities, where it had particularly strong branches, such as Midwoud, Bussum, Hoorn and Goirle. Because of its isolated position it did not supply many aldermen, though between 1974 and 1975 its supplied one Amsterdam alderman.

In the following figure one can see the election results of the provincial election of 1962 per province. It shows the areas where the PSP was strong, namely the urban areas like North Holland and South Holland. The party was weaker in rural Catholic provinces like Limburg and North Brabant, but also strong in the rural traditional socialist strongholds such as rural Groningen and Friesland.

Province	Result (seats)
Groningen	2
Friesland	2
Drenthe	0
Overijssel	1
Gelderland	0
Utrecht	1
North Holland	5
South Holland	2
Zeeland	0
North Brabant	0
Limburg	0

== Electorate ==
The party's electorate was very heterogeneous, although most voters could be seen as intellectuals, students, scientists, artists, while most socialist parties are oriented at workers. The party was a refuge for people who no longer felt at home in the social-democratic PvdA and the Communist Party of the Netherlands. It was supported by progressive Christians, especially Mennonites. Most of its voters lived in Amsterdam or Rotterdam.

The electorate of the PSP fluctuated; the changing appeal of the PvdA and the CPN played a role, as did the events of the Cold War. The rise of youth movements, like Provo, and the Vietnam war boosted the electorate of the party in the 1960s. Internal conflicts in the PSP and radical course of the social-democratic PvdA cost the PSP votes in the 1970s. The mass demonstrations against the placement of nuclear weapons boosted the party's support in the early 1980s.

== Organisation ==
=== Organisational structure ===
The highest organ of the PSP was the congress, formed by delegates from the municipal branches. It convened once every year. It appointed the party board and decided the order of the Senate, House of Representatives and European Parliament candidate lists and had the final say over the party program. For the months that the congress did not convene, a party council took over its role. It consisted out of representatives of all the municipal branches.

The party board consisted of 10 members: a party chair, general secretary, treasurer, political secretary, parliamentary secretary, international secretary, youth secretary, education secretary, the secretary for propaganda and a chair for the committee for radio and television.

=== Linked organisations ===
The PSP published its own magazine which was called Liberation (Dutch: Bevrijding) between 1957 and 1966 and 1978 and 1991 and Radical: Weekly for Socialism and Peace (Dutch: Radikaal: Weekbad voor Socialisme en Vrede) between 1967 and 1977. It was printed at the PSPs own printing company also called Liberation.

The PSPs youth was organised in the Pacifist Socialist Young Working Groups (Dutch: Pacifistisch Socialistische Jongeren Groepen, PSJG) between 1977 and 1991. Between 1985 and 1991 the PSJG became more independent as it saw itself as the youth organisation of both the PSP and the PSvO which had split from the party. It published Keihard Tegengeweld (the title is a pun as it means both strongly against violence as strong counter-violence) and Disaster (Dutch: RamPSPoed, which spells PSP). In 1991 the PSJG merged into DWARS GreenLeft youth, which continued publishing Disaster until 1995.

In the 1980s the scientific institute of the PSP cooperated strongly with the scientific institutes of the PPR and CPN. They published De Helling together since 1985. The Rode Draad was published since 1985 it was a magazine for municipal and provincial councillors the PSP, PPR and CPN.

=== Relationships to other parties ===
For a long time the party refused to cooperate with other parties and preferred a position of testimonial party, which resembles the position of the Dutch orthodox Protestant parties, like the Political Reformed Party. The PSP's members of parliament, although isolated because of their radical position, were often respected across all parties for their principled position, commitment, rhetoric abilities and demeanour.

Between 1956 and 1981 it was at "cold war" with the Communist Party of the Netherlands as many former communists had joined the PSP's ranks. The PSP was highly critical of the CPN's Stalinist course. After 1981 the CPN, which had destalinized and PSP, began to cooperate more closely. The Christian left Political Party of Radicals and the Evangelical People's Party were also dismissed by the PSP as too supportive of the PvdA and too moderate on important issues. After 1981 the PPR broke its links with the PvdA and became more oriented toward PSP and CPN. In the 1980s the four parties began to cooperate in municipal and European elections, because fewer seats can be won there. In 1989 this intensive cooperation led to the formation of a new party, the GreenLeft.

The party was originally sympathetic to the Labour Party PvdA. Before the party was founded, the group of politically homeless activists had asked to have an independent candidate on their lists. During the 1960s the relation deteriorated, as the PSP rejected the PvdA's moderate course and the PvdA the PSP's radical course. In 1971 the PvdA, which had become more leftwing under pressure of a new generation of party members, opened the door to the PSP. It wanted the PSP to cooperate in the Progressive Accords together with left-liberal Democrats 66 and the PPR. The PSP rejected as it felt these accords would be neither socialist nor pacifist. This decision let to considerable upheaval within the party. In the 1980s as the PvdA became more centrist, the PSP rejected the PvdA even more.
