= Rainbow (Netherlands) =

Rainbow Regenboog
- Founded: 1989
- Dissolved: 24 November 1990
- Preceded by: Green Progressive Accord
- Succeeded by: GroenLinks
- Ideology: Green politics Democratic socialism
- European affiliation: EGC
- European Parliament group: RBW

The Rainbow (Dutch: Regenboog) was an alliance of Dutch political parties, which included the Political Party of Radicals, the Pacifist Socialist Party, the Evangelical People's Party and the Communist Party of the Netherlands.

== History ==
The parties contested the 1989 European Parliament election with a common list. The alliance won 7% of the vote, which gave it two seats in the European Parliament, which were taken by Nel van Dijk (CPN) and Herman Verbeek (PPR). In the 1984 European Parliament election the parties, together with the Green Party of the Netherlands had also formed a common list called Green Progressive Accord. The alliance was renamed on instigation of the PSP, which disliked the term "green". The alliance executive was chaired by Wim de Boer. In the 1989 general election the three parties together formed a common list called GroenLinks. In 1990 the parties dissolved and GroenLinks was formed as a political party.

== Composition ==
| Party | Abbr. | Ideology | Position |
|---|---|---|---|
| Political Party of Radicals | PPR | Christian left | Left-wing |
| Pacifist Socialist Party | PSP | Democratic socialism | Left-wing |
| Evangelical People's Party | EVP | Christian left | Centre-left |
| Communist Party of the Netherlands | CPN | Eurocommunism | Far-left |

== European election result ==
| Election | List | Votes | % | Seats | Notes |
|---|---|---|---|---|---|
| 1989 | List | 365,535 | 6.97 | 2 / 25 | |

== See also ==
- List of GroenLinks members of the European Parliament
