= List of GroenLinks members of the European Parliament =

This is a list of all (former) Members of the European Parliament for the GreenLeft (GL).

== List ==
Name	Start of term	End of term	Ref.
Theo Bouwman	20 July 1999	20 July 2004	
Kathalijne Buitenweg	20 July 1999	14 July 2009	
Marije Cornelissen	14 July 2009	1 July 2014	
Nel van Dijk	25 July 1989	1 September 1998	
Bas Eickhout	14 July 2009	12 June 2026	
Joost Lagendijk	1 September 1998	14 July 2009	
Alexander de Roo	20 July 1999	20 July 2004	
Judith Sargentini	14 July 2009	1 July 2019	
Kim van Sparrentak (Note: GreenLeft merged into Progressief Nederland (PRO) in 2026; continues as a PRO member.)	2 July 2019	12 June 2026	
Tineke Strik	2 July 2019	12 June 2026	
Herman Verbeek (Note: Left GreenLeft on 3 January 1994 and served the rest of his term outside the party.)	25 July 1989	19 July 1994	
Catarina Vieira	16 July 2024	12 June 2026	
