= List of candidates in the 1984 European Parliament election in the Netherlands =

The 1984 European Parliament election for the election of the delegation from the Netherlands was held on 14 June 1984. This was the 2nd time the elections had been held for the European elections in the Netherlands.

== Background ==
The official order and names of candidate lists:

Candidate lists for the 1984 European Parliament election in the Netherlands
List		English translation	List name (Dutch)
1	list	CDA European People's Party	CDA Europese Volkspartij
2	list	Labour Party/European Socialists	Partij van de Arbeid/Europese Socialisten
3	list	VVD - European Liberal-Democrats	VVD - Europese Liberaal-Democraten
4	list	D'66	
5	list	SGP, RPF and GPV	SGP, RPF en GPV
6	list	C.P.N. Green Party Netherlands P.P.R. P.S.P.	C.P.N. Groene Partij Nederland P.P.R. P.S.P.
7	list	European Greens	Europese Groenen
8	list	Centre Party	Centrumpartij
9	list	God with Us	God met Ons

== CDA European People's Party ==
Candidate list for the Christian Democratic Appeal
Number	Candidate	Votes	Result	Ref.
1	Bouke Beumer	1,411,209	Elected	
2	Wim Vergeer	24,772	Elected	
3	Teun Tolman	20,187	Elected	
4	Jean Penders	5,993	Elected	
5	Hanja Maij-Weggen	24,461	Elected	
6	Yvonne van Rooy	9,634	Elected	
7	Elise Boot	4,607	Elected	
8	Pam Cornelissen	12,752	Elected	
9	Jim Janssen van Raay	5,365	Replacement	
10	Jan Reijnen	16,354		
11	Sjouke Jonker	1,803		
12	Koos van der Steenhoven	3,497		
13	Aat de Jonge	2,362		
14	Loek Duijn	1,854		
15	Rob van de Beeten	3,230		
16	Annemieke van Heel-Kasteel	1,936		
17	G.K. Timmerman	1,168		
18	J.P. Westhoff	1,686		
19	E.J. van der Stroom	902		
20	A. Stokkers	870		
21	J. Hollander	1,183		
22	F.H. Velraad	2,913		
23	A.H. Wibier	2,603		
24	Ries Smits	1,170		
25	Corrie Moret-de Jong	908		
26	W.J. Polman	1,047		
27	Cees Veerman	678		
28	D. Verberne	1,759		
29	P.J.M. Thomeer	3,582		
30	E. van den Schouten	1,139		
31	H.G.J. van Roekel	1,772		
32	J.A.R.M. Douwes	1,026		
33	C.A.H. van den Houtman	876		
34	N.W. Caro	241		
35	M. van Ditmarsch	419		
36	H.C.G. Galesloot	409		
37	M. Musch	567		
38	F.H.A.B.M de Bekker	2,255		
39	A.A. Braam	3,038		
40	J.M. Spatgens	8,374		
Total				

== Labour Party/European Socialists ==
Candidate list for the Labour Party
Number	Candidate	Votes	Result	Ref.
1	Piet Dankert	1,487,453	Elected	
2	Ien van den Heuvel-de Blank	98,003	Elected	
3	Eisso Woltjer	15,230	Elected	
4	Hedy d'Ancona	80,616	Elected	
5	Hemmo Muntingh	6,473	Elected	
6	Phili Viehoff	4,980	Elected	
7	Bob Cohen	3,184	Elected	
8	Ben Visser	8,584	Elected	
9	Alman Metten	3,300	Elected	
10	Annie Krouwel-Vlam	6,425		
11	Jannis Henri Erasmus	2,487		
12	P.G. Ketelaar	1,950		
13	D.F. Toornstra	945		
14	E.E. Bolhuis	2,692		
15	Johan T. van Minnen	10,917		
16	Klaas de Vries	5,221		
17	Alphons Paul Ranner	1,710		
18	Johannes Petrus van Bergen	3,670		
19	A.R. Burger	1,867		
20	P.L.J.M. Nelissen	1,169		
21	Arend Jan Hilhorst	1,943		
22	Simon Petrus Maria Vroonhof	6,112		
23	H.T. Lankamp	788		
24	Henk Hartmeijer	1,008		
25	Gerard Cornelis Metselaar	2,088		
26	J.M.H.M. Wevers	9,705		
27	Robert van de Water	1,700		
28	Ad Melkert	296		
29	Lammert Halfwerk	1,488		
30	Valentijn van Koppenhagen	1,220		
31	Hendrik van Dantzig	438		
32	Pieter Cornelis Goosen	312		
33	Boudewijn Bruil	1,089		
34	Pieter de Vries	1,279		
35	M.C. Meijvogel	4,183		
36	Alger Jan Algra	1,147		
37	Jan Nagel	3,727		
Total				

== VVD - European Liberal-Democrats ==
Candidate list for the People's Party for Freedom and Democracy
Number	Candidate	Votes	Result	Ref.
1	Hans Nord	743,445	Elected	
2	Hendrik Jan Louwes	22,795	Elected	
3	Jessica Groenendaal-Larive	32,393	Elected	
4	Gijs de Vries	26,848	Elected	
5	Florus Wijsenbeek	8,543	Elected	
6	Jan Mulder	3,129		
7	J.M.A. Hosman	4,546		
8	B.M. Jellema	1,748		
9	A.W. Kroner	1,879		
10	W.A.H. Steyling	2,068		
11	Jan Hendrik Klein Molekamp	4,581		
12	P. Alberti	1,991		
13	J.P. Anemaet	635		
14	Pieter Roscam Abbing	1,483		
15	J. de Boer	3,058		
16	Justin Hemmes	3,415		
17	J.W. Letterie	871		
18	J.C. Cleyndert	909		
19	Bert Wijers	1,255		
20	H.J. Willemsen	784		
21	Ted Jansen	1,408		
22	Th. Brans	1,060		
23	Jan Franssen	747		
24	D.H. Kok	2,540		
25	H.J. Sengers geb. Van Gijn	1,677		
26	Nicoline van den Broek-Laman Trip	3,180		
27	Cobi de Blécourt-Maas	1,180		
28	Jan Muntinga	1,418		
29	Ym van der Werff	1,948		
30	M.H.C. Lodewijks	3,430		
31	J.G. Termeer geb. Van Valburg	562		
32	Huub Jacobse	2,234		
33	A.C.A. Dake	480		
34	F.G.J. Steenmeijer	944		
35	P.T. Siertsema geb. Smid	958		
36	Albert-Jan Evenhuis	1,847		
37	S.J.R. de Monchy	945		
38	D. Luteijn	1,624		
39	Jan Kamminga	5,767		
40	Ed Nijpels	102,500		
Total				

== D'66 ==
Candidate list for the Democrats 66
Number	Candidate	Votes	Result	Ref.
1	Doeke Eisma			
2	P.C.A. van Tets			
3	Johanna Boogerd-Quaak			
4	S. Schaap			
5	K.J.R. Klompenhouwer			
6	A.A. Manten			
7	W. de Jong			
8	Thom de Graaf			
9	W.P. Uerz			
10	A.H. van Wijk			
11	J. Drenten			
12	Roger van Boxtel			
13	A.F. de Man			
14	W.Q.H. Colin			
15	J.C.H.G. Hendriks			
16	C.J. Bruring			
Total				

== SGP, RPF and GPV ==
Candidate list for the SGP, RPF and GPV
Number	Candidate	Votes	Result	Ref.
1	Leen van der Waal	214,531	Elected	
2	Rijk van Dam	11,581		
3	Eimert van Middelkoop	36,187		
4	Gerrit Jan Smit	1,458		
5	J. Huizinga	853		
6	Hans Blokland	1,243		
7	A.K. van der Staay	286		
8	A.W. Biersteker	495		
9	S. de Vries	1,086		
10	Gerrit Holdijk	598		
11	A. Kadijk	374		
12	M.P.H. van Haeften	444		
13	Gert van den Berg	669		
14	J.H. van Schaik	217		
15	Jurn de Vries	508		
16	Driekus Barendregt	316		
17	Peter van Dalen	294		
18	W. Haitsma	303		
19	G. Versteeg	441		
20	A.W.J. Schoo	243		
21	L. Feijen	293		
22	Rinus Houtman	333		
23	G. Meijer	139		
24	Bert Groen	113		
25	M. Burggraaf	404		
26	P. Langeler	145		
27	G. Nederveen	243		
28	P. Mulder	278		
29	G. Broere	625		
30	Bart Verbrugh	1,124		
Total				

== C.P.N. Green Party Netherlands P.P.R. P.S.P. ==
Candidate list for the Green Progressive Accord
Number	Candidate	Votes	Result	Ref.
1	Bram van der Lek	206,980	Elected	
2	Herman Verbeek	10,237	Elected	
3	Nel van Dijk	30,477	Replacement	
4	Roel van Duijn	15,115		
5	Fon ten Thij	1,592		
6	Chiel von Meijenfeldt	4,572		
7	Emmy van Noord geb. Verheul	4,350		
8	Pierre Puts	502		
9	Anneke van 't Hull	2,325		
10	Sander Doeve	991		
11	Jan Renes	1,316		
12	Simone Walvisch	2,472		
13	Margo Andriessen	1,571		
14	Luppo Leeuwerik	1,673		
15	Ate Flapper	612		
16	Bert Willemsen	455		
17	Jan Muijtjens	1,767		
18	Letty Draisma geb. Van der Stap	341		
19	Truus Divendal geb. Klok	513		
20	Cor Ofman	269		
21	Hein Verkerk	284		
22	John van Tilborg	178		
23	Jaap de Jong	478		
24	Jopie van der Werf	602		
25	Jannie Kuik	755		
26	Lambert Meertens	295		
27	Hans Bouma	921		
28	Rudi van der Velde	422		
29	Willem Verf	101		
30	Wim Keizer	299		
31	Wilbert Willems	728		
32	Jan Schreur	408		
33	John Hontelez	478		
34	Willy van der Vlist geb. Wesseldijk	396		
35	Jaap Lok	306		
36	Henri Stroband	100		
37	Guus van der Linde	310		
38	Pieter Klaas Knol	203		
39	Leo Jansen	374		
40	Frans Janssen	748		
Total				

== European Greens ==
Candidate list for The Greens
Number	Candidate	Votes	Result	Ref.
1	Bart Kuiper			
2	Alice de Gier			
3	Marianne Hartzuiker			
4	Vic Langenhoff			
5	Hans Rijnders			
6	Marlies Coenen			
7	Ben Papendorp			
8	Fokke van den Akker			
9	Cor Aakster			
10	Elisabeth Ricbau-Swart			
11	Peter Vroom			
12	Rinus Schmale			
13	Marco van der Meij			
14	Ineke van der Maat			
15	Hans Ramaer			
16	Wim de Leijster			
17	Peter Bisschop			
18	Bert Breed			
19	Joep Bersten			
20	Marten Bierman			
Total				

== Centre Party ==
Candidate list for the Centre Party
Number	Candidate	Votes	Result	Ref.
1	Alfred Vierling			
2	M.T. Giesen			
3	Pim Lier			
4	D.H.M. Segers			
5	Wim Bruyn			
6	D.C. Aken			
7	M.L.P.J. Segers geb. Majoie			
8	H.H.A. van der Heijden			
9	W.M.A. Klessens geb. Den Teuling			
10	J.C. Wapenaar			
11	M. den Dulk			
12	A. Alblas			
13	F. Schoenmakers			
14	C.W. Zwalve			
15	H. Krol			
16	J. Camphuis			
17	H.J.M. Pasmans			
18	W. Sparreboom			
19	J.G. Damhuis			
20	G.R. Tiller			
21	P.C. van Es			
22	A. Konst			
23	J.J. Pronk			
24	H.W. de Wijer			
25	H. Spaans			
26	Hans Janmaat			
Total				

== God with Us ==
Candidate list for God with Us
Number	Candidate	Votes	Result	Ref.
1	Tine Cuijpers-Boumans			
2	J. Hoogland			
3	Th.F. Bakker			
4	J. Kapteijn			
5	A.H. Huyskes			
6	P.C. Jacobi			
7	E.L.A. van Nispen tot Pannerden			
Total				

== Sources ==
- Data of the 1984 European Election by the Electoral Committee
