= Chiel von Meijenfeldt =

Dutch major general and peace activist (1923–1990)

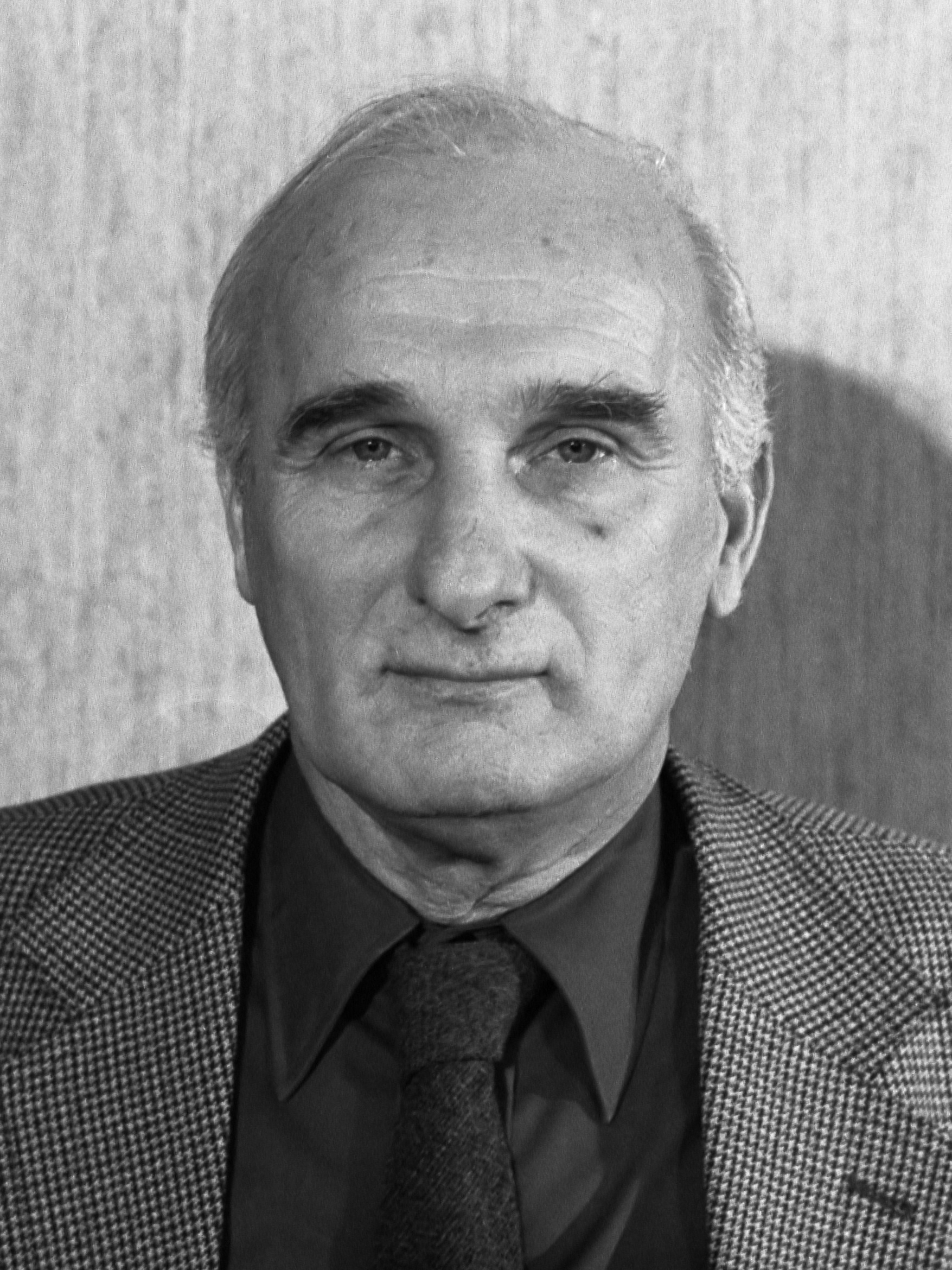
- Chiel von Meijenfeldt in 1981

Personal details
- Born: Michiel Hermann von Meijenfeldt; 4 January 1923 Rotterdam, Netherlands
- Died: 24 November 1990 (aged 67) Roermond, Netherlands
- Party: ARP (until 1980); EVP (1981–1990)
- Spouse(s): Cornelia Klazina Gloude (m. 1949; died 1977) Isolde Hild (m. 1978)
- Children: 7

Military service
- Allegiance: Dutch East Indies; The Netherlands
- Branch/service: Royal Netherlands East Indies Army; Royal Netherlands Army
- Years of service: 1945–1980
- Rank: Major General

Michiel Hermann "Chiel" von Meijenfeldt (4 January 1923 – 24 November 1990) was a Dutch major general and peace activist. From the late 1940s to 1980, he served as a military officer in the Royal Netherlands East Indies Army and subsequently the Royal Netherlands Army. Nicknamed the "Red General" for his controversial progressive views and outspoken opposition to nuclear weapons, he was active in the Dutch peace movement, leading the Christian anti-war Interchurch Peace Council from 1976 to 1977 and being a part of the Generals for Peace movement, which was financially supported by East Germany. He was also a member of the Christian left Evangelical People's Party (EVP) in the 1980s.

== Early life ==
Chiel von Meijenfeldt was born on 4 January 1923 in Rotterdam to Hijlke Roelof von Meijenfeldt, an architect, and Louise Gesina Westerhoff. Von Meijenfeldt was a member to the Reformed Churches in the Netherlands, and he would remain active in the church on a local and national level throughout his life. Von Meijenfeldt attended secondary school in Rotterdam and later in Voorburg, where he graduated in 1942. During the last year of World War II, Von Meijenfeldt was a member of the Dutch resistance.

== Military career ==
Following the end of World War II, Von Meijenfeldt volunteered to serve in the Dutch military in the Dutch East Indies in 1945, where he became a lieutenant in the Royal Dutch East Indies Army in 1948. Von Meijenfeldt returned to the Netherlands to complete training as a reserve officer, after which he returned to Indonesia where he served as a military advisor to the Indonesian Army as part of the Military Mission for Indonesia. In 1953 he returned to the Netherlands permanently, having been promoted to lieutenant adjutant at the Dutch army's infantry school in Harderwijk. In 1961, Von Meijenfeldt enrolled at the Higher Military School (Hogere Krijgsschool) in The Hague, where he was one of its most skilled students.

In 1964, Von Meijenfeldt was tasked by state secretary Joop Haex with reforming the army, but was unsuccessful in his attempts. He again became involved with Haex in 1967 after he and several colleagues had publicly spoken out against the divide between military leadership and the enlisted and unclear policy in regard to military democratization. In 1970, he became part of the Study Center for Military Leadership (Studiecentrum voor Militair Leiderschap) in Hilversum, where he began to put his modernizing ideas into practice.

Von Meijenfeldt's views, including his advocacy for a nuclear no first use policy and nuclear-weapon-free zones, made him a controversial figure within the Dutch army. Defense minister Hans de Koster attempted twice to have Von Meijenfeldt moved to a field position which was seen as a punishment for Von Meijenfeldt's outspoken views, once unsuccessfully in 1971, but eventually managed to appoint him as deputy commander of the 13th Light Brigade in Oirschot. In 1972, lieutenant general Ferry Meijnderts, an associate of Von Meijenfeldt, sending a note criticizing military policy directly to prime minister Barend Biesheuvel, bypassing the chain of command and causing a scandal which became known as the generaalsruzie and led to the resignation of several prominent military generals.

In 1976, defense minister Henk Vredeling appointed Von Meijenfeldt as governor of the Koninklijke Militaire Academie (KMA) in what was viewed as an explicitly political move due to Von Meijenfeldt's modernizing views, a role in which he served until 1980, and in 1977 he was promoted to major general. Von Meijenfeldt's views would earn him the nickname of "the Red General", though Von Meijenfeldt himself explicitly rejected the label. As head of the KMA, Von Meijenfeldt loosened restrictions on its students, abolishing its curfew, and became a popular figure among the student body. He also sought to modernize military management at the KMA. After the ascension of the right-wing First Van Agt cabinet, Von Meijenfeldt lost his political support, and after his retirement from the army in 1980 many of his reforms were undone.

== Activism ==
In the 1970s, Von Meijenfeldt became involved through the Reformed Churches in the Netherlands in the Dutch peace movement, motivated by his opposition to nuclear weapons. From 1970 to 1978, he was a member of a council appointed by the church's synod which condemned the In 1971, he became the representative of the Reformed Churches in the Netherlands in the Interchurch Peace Council (Interkerkelijk Vredesberaad; IKV), an ecumenical Christian peace organization founded in 1966. He served as the IKV's leader from 1976 to 1977, and as a member of its executive until 1983.

In 1979, Von Meijenfeldt spoke out against the NATO Double-Track Decision, attending an international peace summit in Krefeld the year after, where he came to the attention of East Germany through its GDR Peace Council. He was subsequently approached by Gerhard Kade, a West German economist and informer for the East German State Security Service (Stasi) in 1981. Von Meijenfeldt then became a part of the organization Generals for Peace, which had seven other members including Gert Bastian and was founded by Kade, via whom the group received 100,000 marks in yearly funding from the Stasi. For his efforts, Von Meijenfeldt was awarded the East German Peace Medal in December 1985. In 1986, Von Meijenfeldt participated in the filming of a film promoting the Generals for Peace, which was produced by the DEFA studio in East Berlin but listed Von Meijenfeldt and his fellow generals as co-producers to hide its true origin. Erich Honecker was in attendance at the film premiere.

In 2004, former Stasi deputy head Werner Großmann revealed in a Dutch television broadcast that Generals for Peace had been funded directly by the Stasi, though Von Meijenfeldt was personally unaware of its source. Großmann had previously stated that Von Meijenfeldt never directly worked for the Stasi, but had indirectly supported East German propaganda through his actions.

== Political career ==
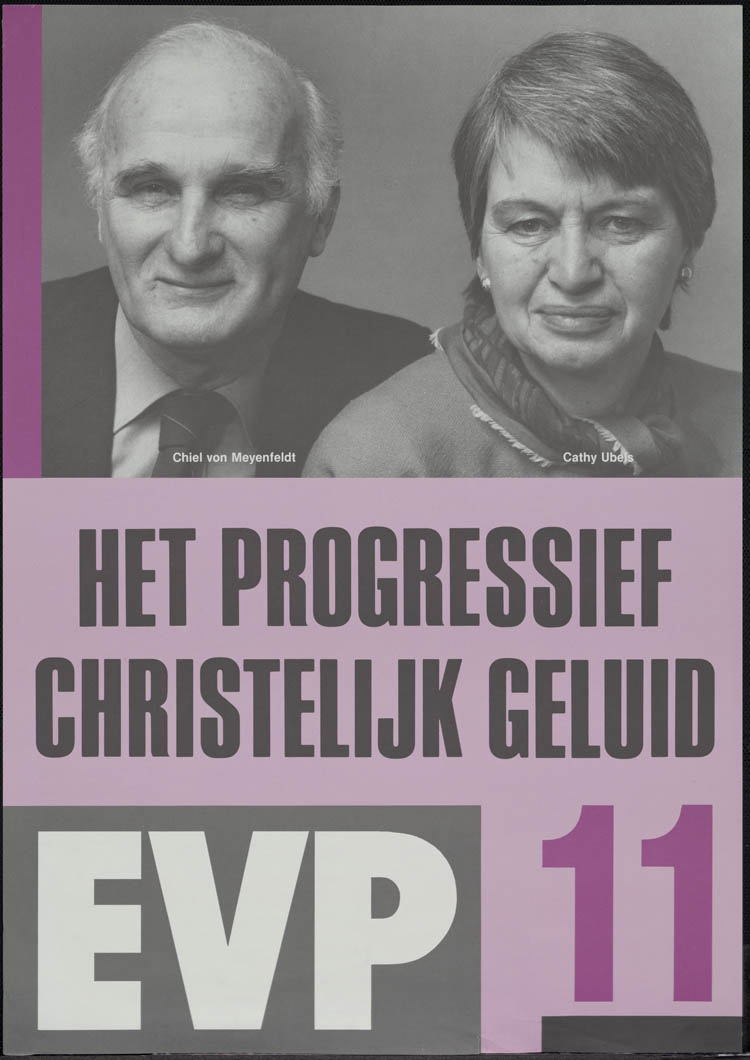
EVP poster for the 1986 Dutch general election, featuring Chiel von Meijenfeldt on the left and Cathy Ubels on the right

Von Meijenfeldt was a long-time member of the Anti-Revolutionary Party (ARP), where he was a part of the party's left wing. He became critical of the ARP's merger into the Christian Democratic Appeal (CDA).In 1978, he signed an open letter criticizing the CDA's policies as too materialistic, and contributed to an internal opposition brochure in which he warned against the nuclear threat. In August 1980, Von Meijenfeldt signed a declaration in support of setting up an alternative to the CDA, and subsequently joined the newly founded Evangelical People's Party (EVP) in 1981.

Von Meijenfeldt was placed second on the EVP electoral list for the 1982 and 1986 Dutch general elections, and was placed sixth on the list of the Green Progressive Accord, a leftist electoral list in which the EVP participated, for the 1984 European Parliament election, but was never elected. He also contributed to the EVP's newspaper EVP-info, where he wrote about nuclear issues. After the merger of the EVP into GroenLinks, Von Meijenfeldt became an independent.

== Views ==
During his years in the Royal Netherlands Army, Von Meijenfeldt was known as a modernizer. In contrast to many of his contemporaries, he was relatively supportive of controversial policy changes in the Dutch military, such as allowing soldiers to have long hair, form unions and refuse to salute their superiors. He was a staunch opponent of nuclear weapons, their placement on Dutch soil, and NATO's nuclear policy. Von Meijenfeldt was however not a pacifist, being an advocate of conscription and participating in drawing up a military strategy for SWAPO on behalf of the anti-apartheid Werkgroep Kairos as part of SWAPO's conflict against South Africa in 1980. According to Von Meijenfeldt, the army was to be a means of "protecting the weak from the strong."

In a 1981 book titled 'Nuclear disarmament: utopia or reality?' (Kernontwapening, utopie of realiteit?), Von Meijenfeldt laid out his vision on nuclear warfare. Seeing nuclear weaponry as an inherent part of contemporary warfare, he predicted that as long as great power politics reigned full-scale nuclear disarmament would be impossible. He proposed instead a return to defense via non-nuclear means in Western Europe, leading up to the full removal of nuclear weapons from the region and an end to geopolitical blocs like NATO. In the meantime, the Netherlands would refuse to place cruise missiles on its own territory and focus on reforming NATO from within. He also supported closer bilateral dialogue between the Netherlands and Eastern Bloc states like Poland, who would simultaneously commit to small-scale demilitarization and spend the freed up funding on various economic projects. On a broader level, Von Meijenfeldt advocated for setting up a cooperation organization in which both NATO and the Warsaw Pact would set up a "collective security concept" in Europe, as well as a global institution to do the same thing on a larger scale. After the fall of the Berlin Wall Von Meijenfeldt advocated for restricting the use of military force to police actions by the United Nations or similar regional organizations. Critics have viewed Von Meijenfeldt as a "useful idiot", who let himself be used as a mouthpiece for East German propaganda. Historian Jan de Bas has characterized Von Meijenfeldt as supporting an "idealist politics based in realism", but who also possessed "a somewhat naive disposition."

== Death ==
Chiel von Meijenfeldt died on 24 November 1990 in Roermond.

== Personal life ==
Von Meijenfeldt married Cornelia Klazina Gloude in Batavia on 21 March 1949, with whom he had two sons and three daughters. After her death, he married Isolde Hild, who was born in 1952, on 31 July 1977, and with whom he had one son and one daughter.

== Bibliography ==
- de Bas, Jan (1999). De muis die even brulde. Kampen: Kok. ISBN 9043500909.
