= Thijs Niemantsverdriet =

Dutch journalist

Thijs Niemantsverdriet (born 1978) is a Dutch journalist who was editor of the weekly Vrij Nederland from 2004 to 2012. In 2008 he won the De Tegel award for journalism for his portraits of MEP Joost Lagendijk and Dutch Minister of Foreign Affairs Frans Timmermans. Since 2012, he has worked for NRC.
