= Green Party of the Netherlands =

Defunct Dutch political party

The Green Party of the Netherlands (GPN) was a Dutch political party. It only existed on paper. The goal of the founders was to preempt the formation of another party calling itself "green". Most of the founders were involved in the Political Party of Radicals (PPR), a progressive Christian party, which was allied to green parties in Europe such as ECOLO and German Greens.

In 1984 the name "Green Party of the Netherlands" was registered with the electoral council by PPR Senator Bas de Gaay Fortman and several other PPR members, including Roel van Duijn and Marten Bierman. They did so without the consent of the PPR executive committee. Their goal was to prevent the formation of another party with the name "green", which could become a competitor of the PPR. After the registration of the GPN a Green Platform was formed in order to green the election manifesto of other political parties.

During the 1984 European Parliament election the GPN participated in the Green Progressive Accord of the PPR with the Pacifist Socialist Party (PSP) and the Communist Party of the Netherlands (CPN). This allowed independent green candidates to take a place on the list. The Green Platform represented the GPN in the negotiation with the PPR, CPN and PSP.

In 1986 GPN lost the sole right to use the term "green", the Federative Greens were formed. The GPN fought the name at the Council of State. It allowed the Federative Greens to participate in the 1986 parliamentary election. In 1989, GreenLeft was formed by the PPR, PSP and CPN together with the Evangelical People's Party (EVP). In response, De Gaay Fortman de-registered the "Green Party of the Netherlands".

There were no organisational ties between The Greens (De Groenen) and the "Green Party of the Netherlands". There are personal ties. GPN founders Roel van Duijn and Marten Bierman were later involved in The Greens.
