= Marijke Vos =

Dutch politician (born 1957)

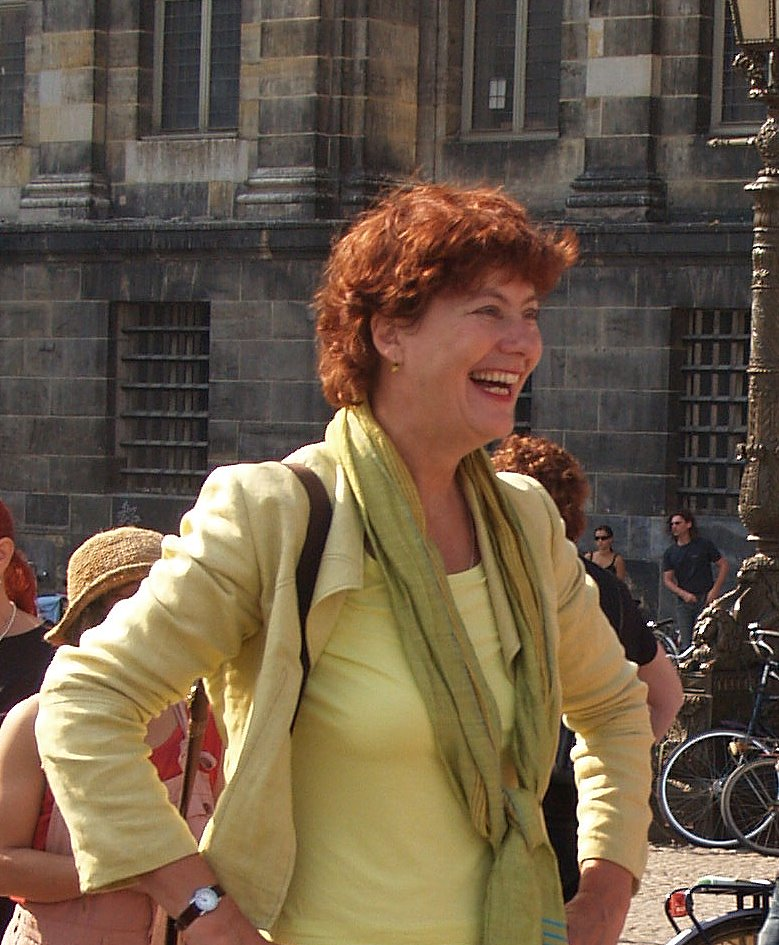
- Vos in Amsterdam in 2007

Amsterdam alderwoman for the Environment and Healthcare
- In office 2006–2010
- Preceded by: Hannah Belliot

Member of Parliament
- In office 1994–2005

Personal details
- Born: 4 May 1957 (age 69) Leidschendam, Netherlands
- Party: GreenLeft

Maria Bernardina (Marijke) Vos (born 4 May 1957 in Leidschendam) is a Dutch politician.

== Career ==
=== Pre-political career ===
Vos's father was a judge in 's-Hertogenbosch. Her grandfather, A.H.J. Engels was member of parliament for the Roman Catholic RKSP.

After finishing gymnasium-b in 's-Hertogenbosch in 1975, Vos went on to study biology at the University of Wageningen, graduating in 1983. During her study she was active in the students movement, the peace movement and the campaign against nuclear energy. In 1984 she worked as teacher and campaigner for an environmental organisation, 'Milieudefensie' ('Defense of the Environment'). In 1990 she began to teach ecology at the Centre of Ecology of the University of Leiden until 1992. In 1989 she became a member of the GreenLeft and almost immediately entered its temporary board, that would oversee the merger of the four parties that would form the GreenLeft. She was elected party chairperson in 1990. In 1992 this office became a paid function and she left the university.

=== Political career ===
In 1994 she stood for the GreenLeft in 1994 general elections. She was elected into the House of Representatives. Between 1995 and 1996 Vos was chairperson of the parliamentary commission on climate change. In 1997 she was elected animal rights protector of the year. Since 1998 Vos has been deputy party leader. In 2003 she was interim party leader, when Femke Halsema gave birth to twins. Between 2001 and 2003 she was chairperson of the parliamentary commission on fraud in the building sector. In 2003 she became a member of the board of advice of the refugee-assistance organisation 'Steunpunt Vluchteling' ('Supportpillar for Refugees'). In 2004 she announced that she would not enter in the next general election, instead she would become alderwoman in Amsterdam, if the GreenLeft enter local government there.

As member of parliament, Vos has shown particular interest in the environment, animal rights, spatial planning and civil liberties.

Since 2004 Vos is co-owner of vineyard in southern France, the vineyard produces organic wine, sunflowers and grain.

=== Local Politics ===
While still in parliament, Vos played an important role in the election campaign and government formation in Amsterdam. In the March 2006 local elections Marijke Vos had a lijstduwer's position on the GreenLeft list for the city council of Amsterdam, she was elected by a large number of preference votes. In April 2006 she was appointed alderwoman in Amsterdam in a PvdA/GreenLeft coalition. On 23 May 2006 she left parliament to devote herself to her alderman's work, she was succeeded by former GreenLeft vice-chair, Nevin Özütok.
