= The Greens (Netherlands) =

Political party in the Netherlands

The Greens De Groenen
- Chairperson: Angela Zikking (acting)
- Founded: 17 December 1983
- Headquarters: De Groenen; Oudegracht 60; NL-3511 AS Utrecht
- Ideology: Green politics
- Political position: Centre-left
- European affiliation: European Green Party
- International affiliation: Global Greens
- Colours: Green
- Seats in the House of Representatives: 0 / 150
- Seats in the Senate: 0 / 75
- States-Provincial: 0 / 566
- Amstel, Gooi en Vecht Water Board: 1 / 26

Website
- www.degroenen.nl

The Greens (DG, De Groenen) is a political party in the Netherlands. It advocates for Green politics, an unconditional basic income and emphasises its anti-militarism.

== History ==
A group of Dutch environmentalists led by Marten Bierman founded The Greens on 17 December 1983. They entered the European elections under the name "European Greens" since the name "The Greens" was controlled by Bas de Gaay Fortman. The party's foundation was supported by the Francophone Belgian green party Ecolo, while the German Greens supported the Green Progressive Accord. The party became involved in the formation of the Coordination of European Green Parties. It won 1.3% of vote in the 1984 European parliament election, below the threshold of 4% for a seat.

For the 1986 national elections, the party used now the name "The Greens", which was abandoned. With Marten Bierman as top-candidate, it won 0.2% of the votes, below the threshold of 0.7% for a seat. The party had a federal structure consisting of provincial parties. In 1987, The Greens participated in the North Holland, South Holland and Gelderland provincial elections. They won one seat on the States of North Holland, partially because of the support of Green Amsterdam led by Roel van Duijn. On March 10, 1989 Green Amsterdam merged with The Greens.

In 1989, GroenLinks was formed by a merger of PPR, PSP, CPN and the Christian left Evangelical People's Party. The Greens rejected to join the merger because it emphasised social-economic issues too much and environmental issues too little. Independently, they participated in the 1989 elections with Roel van Duijn as their top candidate. The party won 0.35% of votes, below the threshold. The party abandoned its federal structure in 1992.

For the Dutch general election of 1994, GroenLinks proposed a candidate chosen by The Greens on place 10 on their list, but this was rejected by The Green's Congress. The party entered the election with Hein Westerouen van Meeteren as top-candidate and won 0.2% of vote. In the 1994 municipal elections the party expanded its number of seats and won seats in Leiden, Nijmegen, Zwolle and Amsterdam. In 1991, GroenLinks MEP Herman Verbeek left his party and continued as an independent. He became a member of The Greens in 1994 and led their European list in the European Parliament election. The party won 2.36% of vote, below the threshold.

In 1995, the party contested several provincial elections. It won seats in North Holland and South Holland (on a combined GroenLinks/The Greens list). In the 1998 elections the party participated with Jaap Dirkmaat as top-candidate and won 0.2% of the votes.

The Greens have not participated in the Dutch general elections since 1998. The party received 0.19% of the vote in the European elections of 2009 and 0.23% of the vote in the European elections of 2014.

By 2017, the party was split into two conflicting groups both claiming legitimacy with the total party membership being 33. One faction held a congress with 10 attendees which elected Otto ter Haar party leader.

== Election results ==
=== House of Representatives ===
The Greens have participated in five elections, failing to pass the threshold of 0,67 percent on each occasion.

Election	Lead candidate	List	Votes	%	Seats	+/–	Government
1986	Marten Bierman	List	18,641	0.20	0 / 150	New	Extra-parliamentary
1989	Roel van Duijn	List	31,312	0.35	0 / 150	0	Extra-parliamentary
1994	Hein Westerouen van Meeteren	List	13,902	0.15	0 / 150	0	Extra-parliamentary
1998	Jaap Dirkmaat	List	16,585	0.19	0 / 150	0	Extra-parliamentary
2021	Otto ter Haar	List	119	0.00	0 / 150	0	Extra-parliamentary
2023 (Note: Run in a joint list with PPNL.)	Mark van Treuren	List	9,117	0.09	0 / 150	0	Extra-parliamentary

=== European Parliament ===
The Greens is a founding party of the European Green Party.
The Greens participated since 1984 six times in the European elections.

Election	List	Votes	%	Seats	+/–	EP Group
1984	List	67,413	1.27 (#8)	0 / 25	New	–
1994	List	97,206	2.35 (#7)	0 / 31	0	–
2009	List	8,517	0.19 (#14)	0 / 25	0	–
2014	List	10,883	0.23 (#14)	0 / 26	0	–
2019	List	9,546	0.17 (#15)	0 / 26	0	–
2024 (Note: In a joint list with Pirate Party.)	List	23,764	0.38 (#16)	0 / 31	0	–

== States-Provincial ==
The Greens have been elected in the States of North Holland between 1987 and 2003, South Holland (1995–1999) and Gelderland (1995–2003).

== Municipal councils ==
The Greens have been elected in municipal councils.

== Water boards ==
In March 2015 The Greens were elected to the water board of Amstel, Gooi en Vecht with 23,604 votes (5.9%).

== See also ==
- Green party
- List of environmental organizations
