= Kathalijne Buitenweg =

Dutch politician (born 1970)

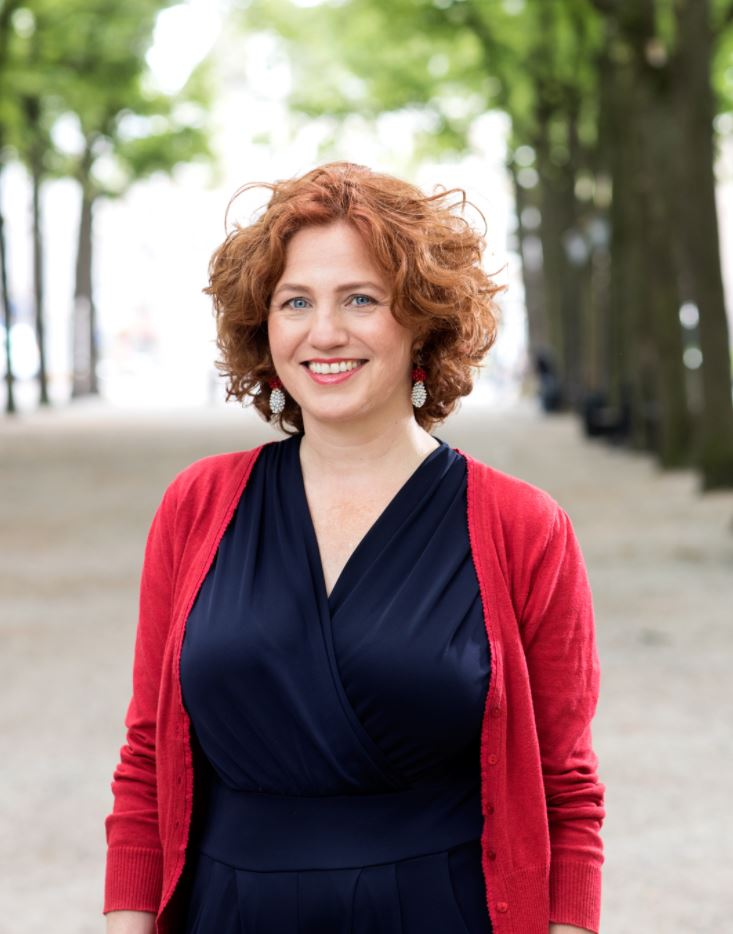

Member of the House of Representatives
- Incumbent
- Assumed office 23 March 2017

Chair of the GreenLeft/Green! delegation in the European Parliament
- In office 2004–2009
- Preceded by: Joost Lagendijk
- Succeeded by: Judith Sargentini

Member of the European Parliament
- In office 1999–2009

Personal details
- Born: 27 March 1970 (age 56) Rotterdam, Netherlands
- Party: GreenLeft
- Spouse: Maarten van Poelgeest
- Website: www.kathalijnebuitenweg.nl

Kathalijne Maria Buitenweg (born 27 March 1970) is a Dutch politician for the GreenLeft who served as a member of the House of Representatives between 2017 and 2021. Between 1999 and 2009, she was a Member of the European Parliament, and sat on the European Parliament's Committee on Civil Liberties, Justice and Home Affairs.

== Career ==
=== Before politics ===
From 1985 to 1986, she was a member of the board of the youth organisation of the environmental organisation NIVON (Dutch Institute for People's Education and Nature Friends). After completing her VWO in 1989, Buitenweg studied History at the University of Amsterdam, where she specialised in European Studies and American Studies, graduating in 1994. In 1991, she became a member of the executive of the European Coordination Bureau of International Youth Organisations, and was elected vice-chairperson in 1993, which she remained until 1995. She also was a trainee at the European Commission from 1994 to 1995, and a member of the steering committee of European Youth Campaign against racism, xenophobia, antisemitism and intolerance, of the Council of Europe.

In 1995, Buitenweg became policy adviser for the European Delegation of the Green Left. In 1998, she moved to The Hague where she was policy advisor to the GreenLeft parliamentary party in the House of Representatives until 1999.

=== European Parliament ===
In 1999, Buitenweg was elected to the European Parliament. From 1999 to 2004, she was a member of the budget committee and the committee on Committee on Civil Liberties, Justice and Home Affairs and a delegate for relations with South Africa. In a controversial Lijsttrekker election in 2004, she became the European Leader of the Green Left. In that election she defeated her friend and colleague Joost Lagendijk, who led the GreenLeft in the -very successful- 1999 campaign. Lagendijk however was the only proposed candidate. In reaction to the motion "we want to choose" which was carried by the GreenLeft party Congress Buitenweg decided to become candidate in the last minutes before the election. The rebellious congress finally had something to choose and voted for Buitenweg.

She was a member of the committee on Civil Liberties, Justice and Home Affairs, between 2004 and 2007, she was a substitute for the Committee on Budgets, a substitute for the temporary committee on policy challenges and budgetary means of the enlarged Union 2007–2013, a member of the delegation for relations with the United States, and a substitute for the delegation for relations with the People's Republic of China. In 2007, she joined the Committee on the Environment, Public Health and Food Safety as a substitute

In 2008, she announced that she would not seek a third term in the European Parliament. She was succeeded as leader of the GreenLeft in the European Parliament by Judith Sargentini.

=== House of Representatives ===
For the 2017 Dutch general election, Buitenweg was nominated as number two on the GreenLeft list. As vice-parliamentary leader she was part of the unsuccessful negotiations to form a cabinet with Democrats 66, Christian Democratic Appeal and People's Party for Freedom and Democracy. She was chair of the temporary parliamentary committee Digital Future. In August 2020, Buitenweg announced that she would not seek another term.

=== Career after politics ===
In January 2021, Buitenweg was nominated and subsequently confirmed as member of the Dutch Council of State, where she will start in June 2021.

== Electoral history ==
Election	Party	Place on the list	Number of votes	Comment
1999 European Parliament election	GreenLeft	2		Elected
2004 European Parliament election	GreenLeft	1		Elected
2006 Dutch general election	GreenLeft	30	2.879	Not elected
2009 European Parliament election	GreenLeft	19	9.174	Not elected
2010 Dutch general election	GreenLeft	30	1.888	Not elected
2012 Dutch general election	GreenLeft	40	573	Not elected
2017 Dutch general election	GreenLeft	2	99.157	Elected
