= Herman Verbeek =

Dutch priest and politician (1936 – 2013)

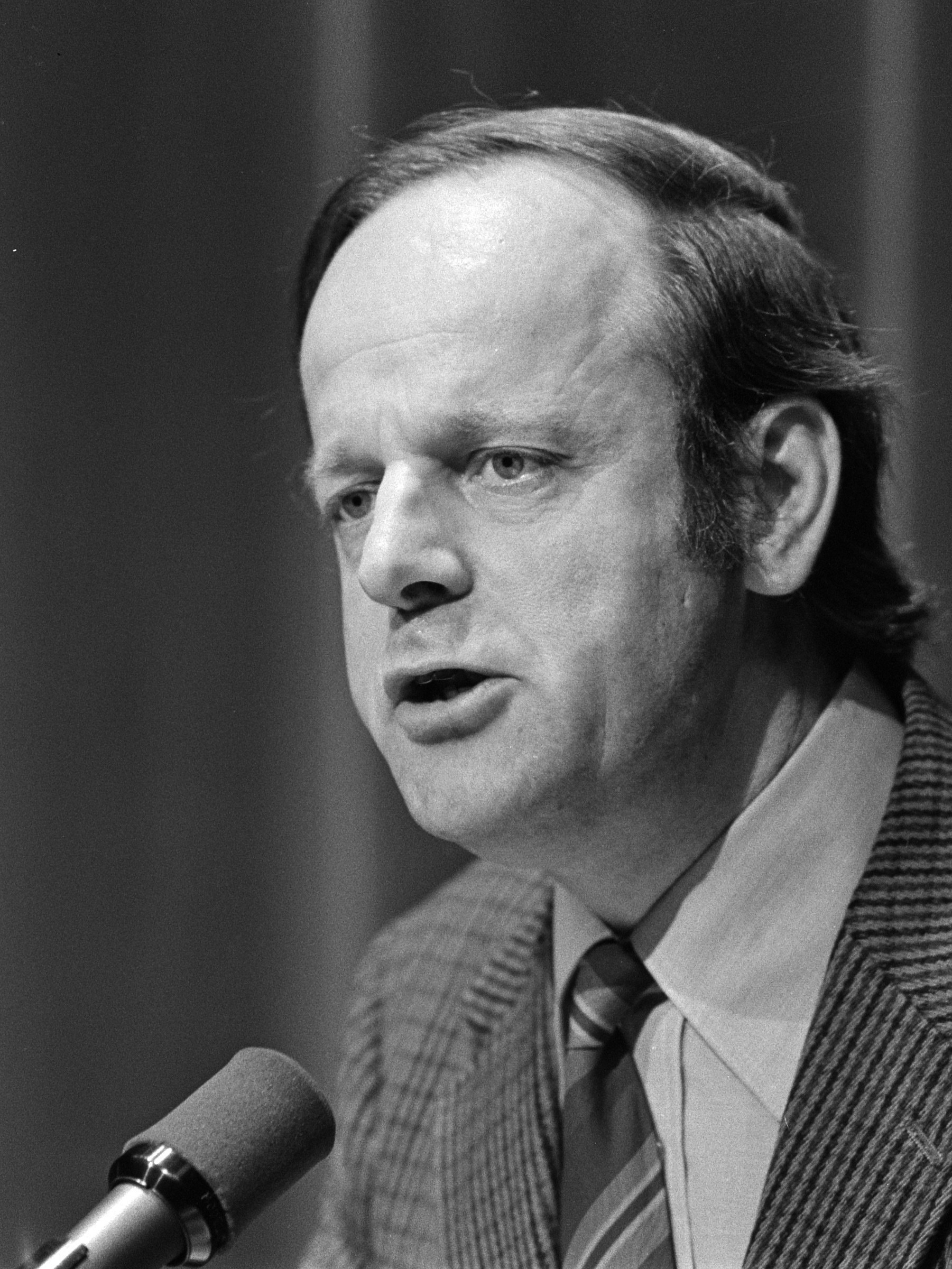
- Verbeek in 1980

Chairman of the Political Party of Radicals
- In office 1977–1981

Member of the European Parliament
- In office 1984–1986
- In office 1989–1994

Personal details
- Born: Herman Alphons Verbeek; 17 May 1936 Groningen, Netherlands
- Died: 1 February 2013 (aged 76) Groningen, Netherlands
- Party: PPR (1969–1989), GroenLinks (1989–1994), The Greens (1993–2009)
- Occupation: Priest, politician, author

Herman Alphons Verbeek (17 May 1936 – 1 February 2013) was a Dutch priest and politician.

== Biography ==
Verbeek studied theology and became a Catholic priest in 1963. From 6 September 1963 to 28 August 1965, he was a chaplain in Joure. Between 1968 and 1973, he was an advisor to the diocese of Groningen. He was a priest of the diocese of Groningen, but since becoming politically active in 1969, he no longer held any ecclesiastical office. In 1999, he openly clashed with the newly appointed bishop of Groningen, Wim Eijk, over his views on sexuality, publicly coming out as a homosexual priest.

From 1974 to 1977, he was the chairman of the provincial board of the Political Party of Radicals in Groningen. From 1977 to 1981, he was the national party chairman. In 1984, he was elected to the European Parliament for the Green Progressive Accord, a coalition of the PPR, the Communist Party of the Netherlands (CPN), and the Pacifist Socialist Party (PSP). It was agreed that the PPR candidate would step down halfway through the term in favor of the CPN candidate, Nel van Dijk. Verbeek left the European Parliament in 1986.

In 1989, Verbeek became the lead candidate for the Rainbow, a coalition of PPR, CPN, PSP, and the EVP, for the 1989 European Parliament election. Again, it was agreed that the PPR candidate would step down halfway through the term, this time in favor of the PSP candidate, John Hontelez. In 1991, Verbeek refused to do so, believing he still had work to do for organic farmers. The party board of GroenLinks (which included PSP, PPR, and CPN) wanted to expel him, but the party council refused to approve the expulsion. Verbeek remained a member of the European Parliament but operated independently of his party. In 1994, he left GroenLinks and became the lead candidate for The Greens in the 1994 European elections, but the party did not meet the electoral threshold.

Verbeek authored many spiritual and political books, such as Tegen de tijdgeest and Liedboek Voor De Ziel.

He died on 1 February 2013. A posthumous autobiography was published.

The ecumenical songbook Zangen van Zoeken en Zien (2015) is dedicated to Herman Verbeek.

In 2018, Dat gij het zingt, a collection of Verbeek's posthumous songs and reflections, was published, edited by Chris van Bruggen and Michaël Steehouder.

== Publications (selection) ==
- Herman Verbeek: Liedboek voor de ziel. Groningen, 2005. ISBN 978-90-8759-470-1
- Herman Verbeek: Toen daalde de duif. Herinneringen Herman Verbeek, priester, politicus, publicist. [Autobiography.] Groningen, 2013. ISBN 978-90-5294-550-7
- Herman Verbeek: In boeren handen. Voor een rechtvaardige en verantwoorde landbouw, Kok Agora, Kampen, 1989. ISBN 9024276160
- Herman Verbeek: Economie als Wereldoorlog, Kok Agora, Kampen, 1990. ISBN 9024276896
- Herman Verbeek: Boeren Belang. Voor een sociale en ekologische organisatie van de landbouw, with a foreword by Sicco Mansholt, Kok Agora, Kampen, 1992. ISBN 9039100276

== Publications about Verbeek ==
- Stefan van der Poel: Herman Verbeek (1936-2013). Priester, politicus, publicist. Hilversum, Uitgeverij Verloren, 2020. ISBN 9789087048327
- Armando Lampe: Een leven dat te denken geeft. Over de priester-politicus Herman Verbeek (1936-2013). Voorburg, U2pi, 2014. ISBN 978-90-8759-470-1
