= Judith Sargentini =

Dutch politician (born 1974)

Judith Sargentini MEP
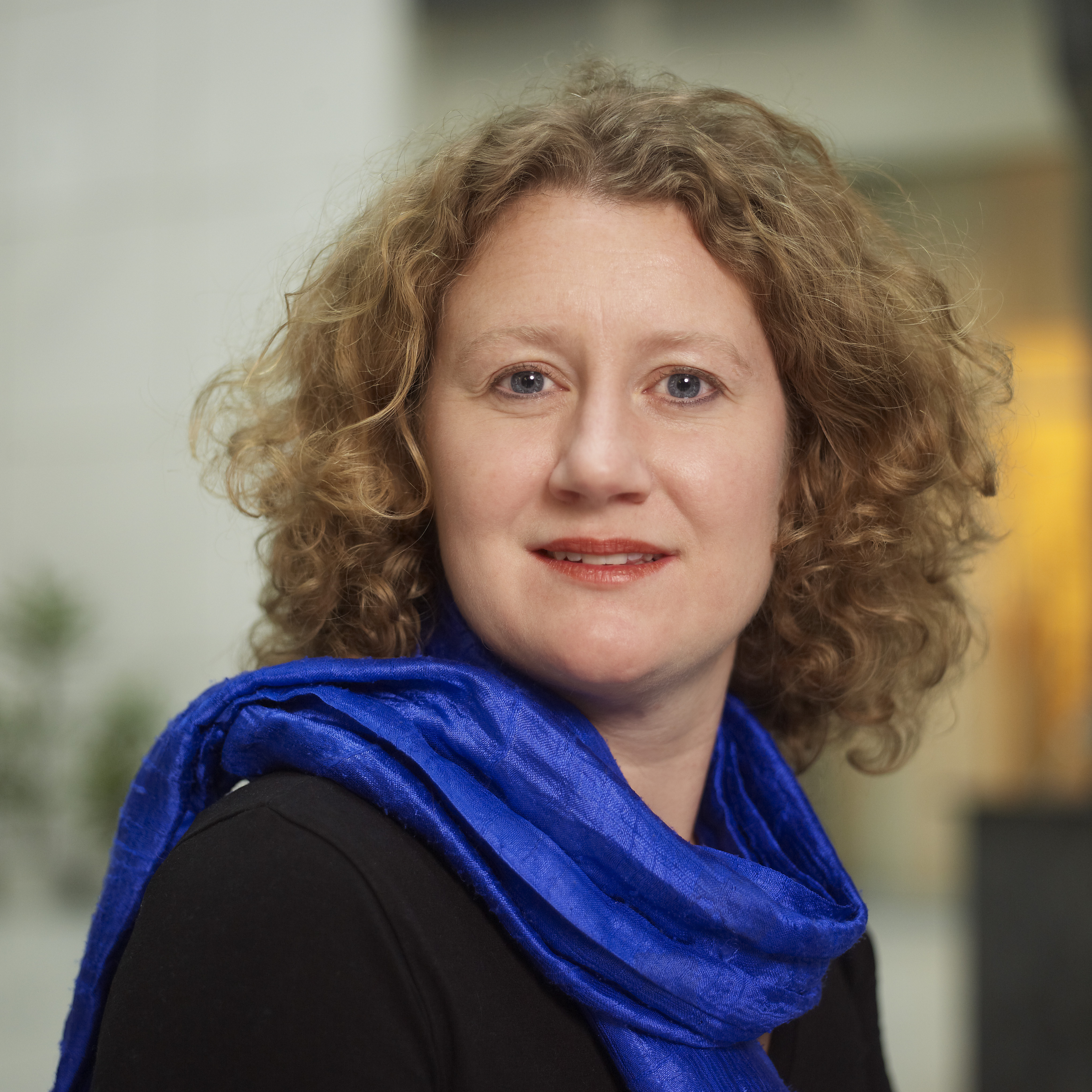

Member of the European Parliament
- In office 1 July 2009 – 2019
- Constituency: Netherlands

Personal details
- Born: 13 March 1974 (age 52) Amsterdam, Netherlands
- Party: Dutch: GreenLeft; EU: European Green Party
- Education: University of Amsterdam
- Website: judithsargentini.nl

Judith Sargentini (born 13 March 1974) is a former Dutch politician and Member of the European Parliament (MEP). She is a member of the GreenLeft (Dutch: GroenLinks) party, which is part of The Greens–European Free Alliance, and the European Green Party. Previously, she was chair of the party's delegation in Amsterdam's city council.

== Biography ==
Sargentini describes her family as being "politically very aware". As a child, her parents took her to demonstrations against the placement of nuclear weapons in the Netherlands. Between 1986 and 1992, she attended high school at the Spinozalyceum in Amsterdam. In 1999 she received an MA of history at the University of Amsterdam (specialising in totalitarian systems and the democratisation of Europe). Since 1990, Sargentini was politically active, first in the PSJG, the political youth organization of the left-socialist Pacifist Socialist Party, and later in DWARS, the political youth organization of the GreenLeft, a new political party in which the PSP had merged. During her study, she was also active in the international student movement. Sargentini is a vegetarian.

== Political career ==
She was secretary of the Dutch Student Union (between 1995 and 1996) and board member of the European Students' Union (in 1998).

In 2002, Sargentini was elected into the Amsterdam municipal council. Between 1999 and 2002, she sat as a co-opted assistant on the municipal council. Between 2006 and 2009, Sargentini served as chair of the GreenLeft party in the Amsterdam municipality. She was spokesperson on work & income, youth policy, and public order.

In addition to her membership of the council, Sargentini worked for various NGOs in the sphere development cooperation. Between 2000 and 2001, she was international coordinator of the European Network for Information and Action in Southern Africa. Following upon that, she worked as international-campaign coordinator for Fatal Transactions, a foundation that highlighted issues surrounding the international trade in conflict diamonds and the financing of (civil) wars in Africa. Between 2003 and 2007, she worked as lobbyist at the Dutch Institute for South Africa. Since 2007, she worked as consultant for the European alliance of development-cooperation organisations Eurostep.

== Member of the European Parliament, 2009–2019 ==
In 2009, Sargentini was one of the candidates for the position of lead candidate on the list of GroenLinks for the 2009 European Parliament elections. While a candidate for the position, Sargentini emphasised issues such as development cooperation, migration, climate change and emancipation. On 8 February 2009, it was announced that she was elected as lead candidate and party foreperson for GroenLinks in the Netherlands European Parliament elections. After five rounds of vote counting, she was elected with 52.4% of the tally.

Sargentini became a member of the Committee on Civil Liberties, Justice, and Home Affairs of the European Parliament, as well as a substitute for the Committee on Development.

In addition to her committee assignments, Sargentini is a member of the European Parliament Intergroup on LGBT Rights. She is also a vice-chairwoman of the cross-party working groups on fair trade (sponsored by Fair Trade Advocacy), as well as on innovation, access to medicines, and poverty-related diseases (sponsored by Médecins Sans Frontières).

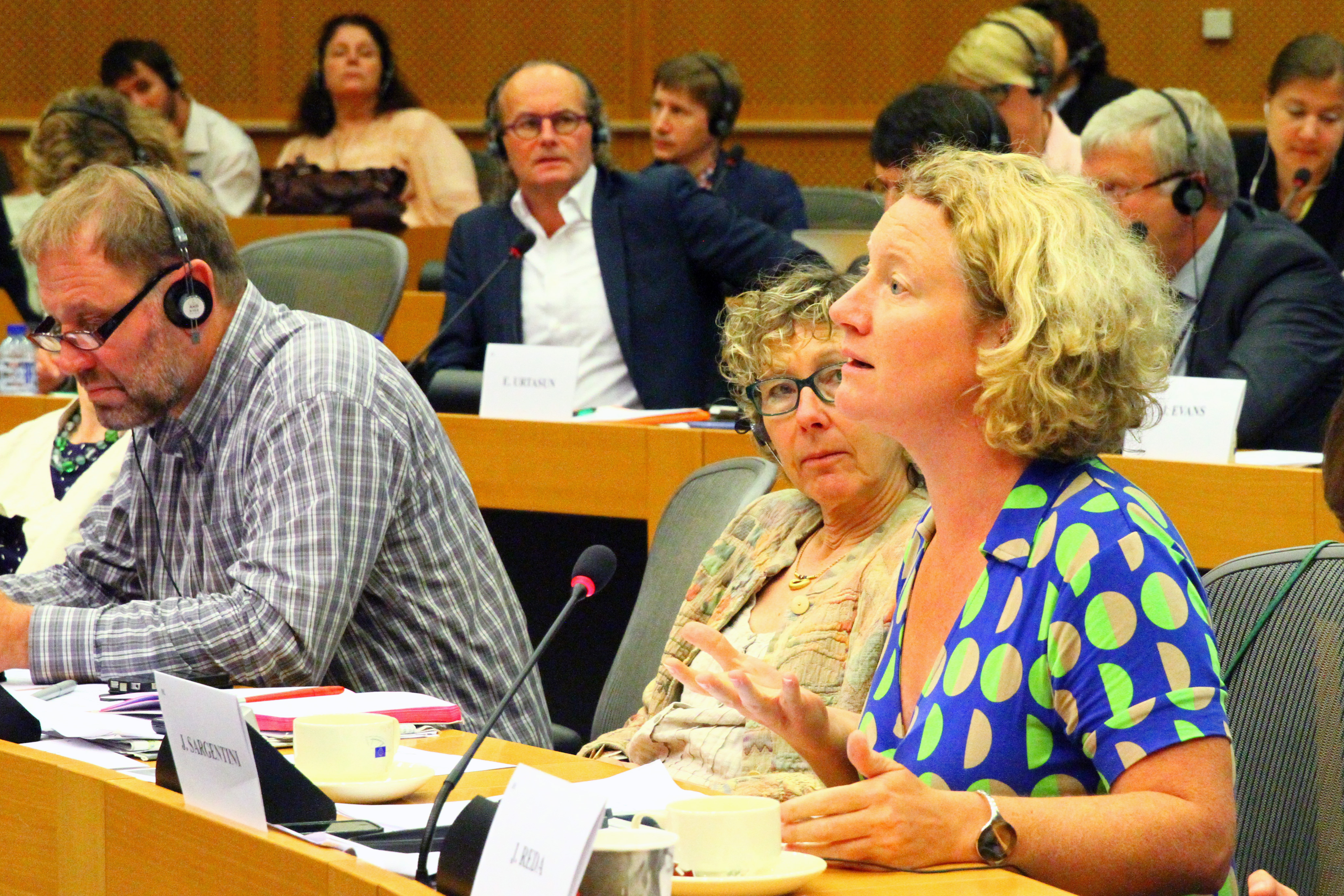

In the European parliament, Sargentini serves as rapporteur on conflict minerals. In 2014, she and Arturs Krišjānis Kariņš persuaded their fellow MEPs to back new rules under which public registers are created listing the beneficial owners of all EU companies and trusts.

From 2014 until 2019, Sargentini was a member of the Democracy Support and Election Coordination Group (DEG), which oversees the Parliament's election observation missions. She has led EU-Election Observer Missions on numerous occasions, including for the 2014 Tunisian parliamentary elections and the 2015 Tanzanian general elections.

=== Report on use of Article 7 against Hungary ===
In 2017, she was appointed by the European Parliament Committee on Civil Liberties, Justice and Home Affairs as the rapporteur to examine triggering Article 7 proceedings against Hungary alleging breaches of "core EU values". On 12 September 2018, the European Parliament adopted a resolution based on her report to trigger Article 7. The report includes concerns mainly regarding the constitutional and electoral system; the independence of the judiciary, corruption; privacy and data protection; freedom of expression; academic independence; freedom of religion and association; the right to equal treatment; the rights of minorities, migrants, asylum seekers and refugees; and the abolition of economic and social rights, antisemitism, antisemitic acts and hate speech. In point 57 of her report, she accused the Hungarian prime minister Viktor Orbán of delivering antisemitic hate speech. In point 67, she said that the conviction of Ahmed H-, a Syrian refugee, who got into conflict with Hungarian policemen at the southern border, raises "the issue of proper application of the laws against terrorism in Hungary, as well as the right to a fair trial". The report was approved by the European Parliament, with 448 votes in favour, 197 against and 48 abstention.

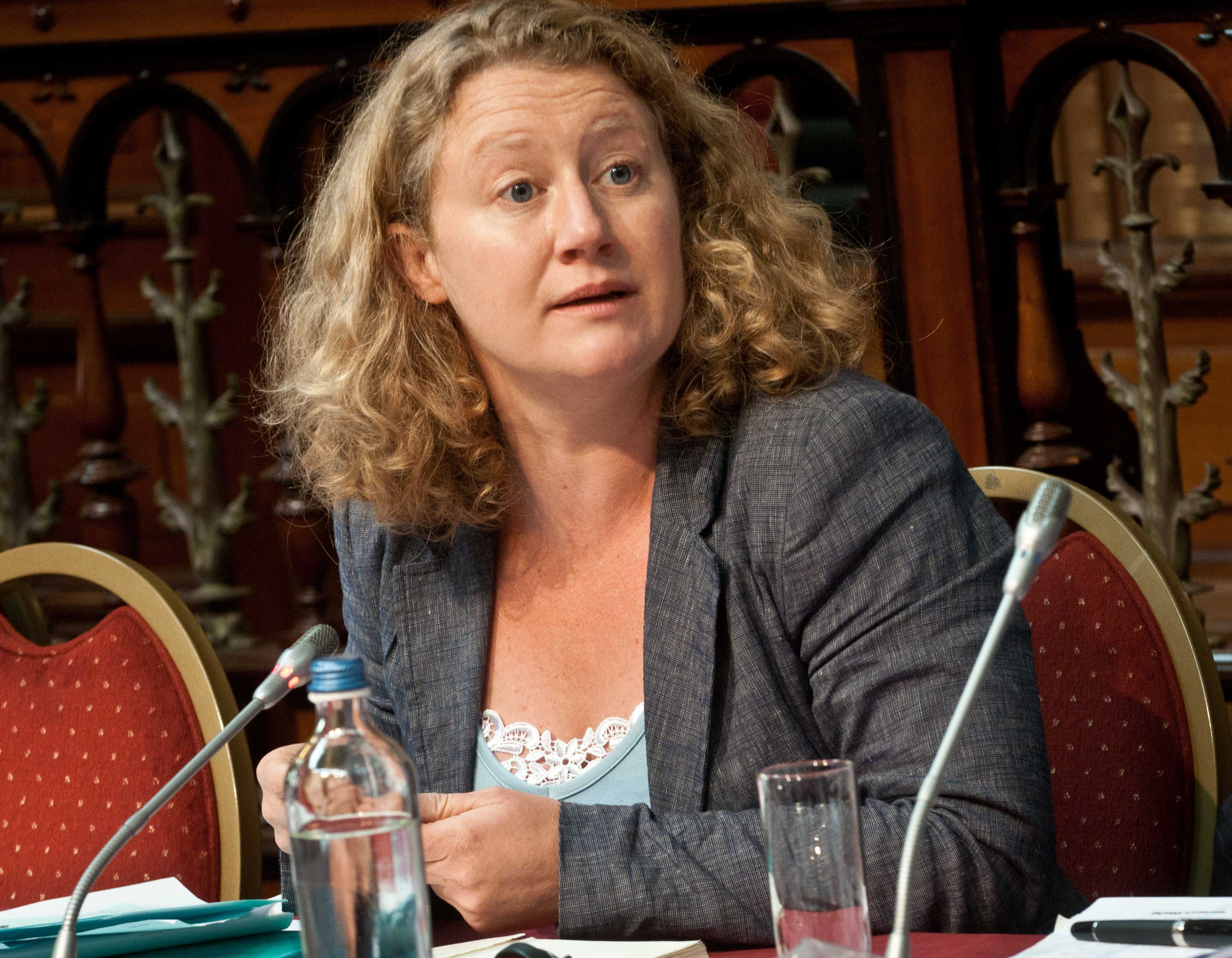

The Hungarian Government questioned the legitimacy of this vote, claiming that this kind of decision would have needed a 2/3 majority. The Orbán-cabinet also stated that the abstinence votes should not have been omitted during the voting process - ignoring that only votes cast, excluding abstentions, were counted on the advice of the Parliament's legal service. Hungary turned to the European Court of Justice for a final decision. The government also edited a 109 pages long answer, which claims that the report contains at least 39 factual errors or fallacies. Sargentini replied at a press conference, stating that she went through it and found "no holes in [her] report since it is based on sources of intergovernmental bodies such as the UN, the Council of Europe, court cases from Strasbourg and Luxembourg, infringement procedures", adding that the report does not express her personal opinion but that of the European Commission. The dean of the Hungarian university ELTE's Faculty of Law claimed that contrarily to what Sargentini said, the university had not been consulted during Sargentini's investigation, and asked the removal of its name from the report many times, without response. On this issue, Sargentini answered that names were omitted on the interviewed academics' request, who feared of being outed as they would be labelled anti-government and pursued for their opinions. Chief Rabbi, Slomó Köves declared that the Sargentini Report is "unfounded and false references don't help the fight against domestic antisemitism, nor its declared objectives to improve democracy" Other Hungarian Jewish leaders, including the leader of the Federation of Jewish Communities in Hungary, also criticised the statement in the Sargentini's report, according to which the Hungarian antisemitism is embodied in hate speech and violence against Jewish person and property. András Heisler claimed that is not the case at all, and according to their statistics, violence against Jews in Hungary actually dropped from 47 cases in 2016 to 37 in 2017. They also critzicised Sargentini's and her party's stance on Israel, which claims apartheid in connection with Israel.

Following her report, Sargentini became the subject of a negative TV campaign financed by the Hungarian government. Deserted by many of his conservative allies, the membership of the Hungarian governing party Fidesz was partially suspended by the European People's Party on 20 March 2019.

== Other activities ==
- Fair Trials International, Patron
- Resistance Museum, Member of the Board
