= Green Progressive Accord =

Green Progressive Accord Groen Progressief Akkoord
- Abbreviation: GPA
- Founded: 1984
- Dissolved: 1989
- Merged into: Rainbow
- European affiliation: EGC
- European Parliament group: RBW

The Green Progressive Accord (Dutch: Groen Progressief Akkoord) was an alliance of Dutch political parties: the Political Party of Radicals (PPR), the Pacifist Socialist Party (PSP), the Communist Party of the Netherlands (CPN) and the Green Party of the Netherlands (GPN).

The parties contested the 1984 European Parliament election with a common list. The alliance won two seats, which were taken by Bram van der Lek (PSP) and Herman Verbeek (PPR).

Five years later the PPR, CPN and PSP contested the 1989 European Parliament election with a common list called "The Rainbow".

In 1990 these three parties merged to form GroenLinks along with the Evangelical People's Party (EVP).

== Election results ==
Election	List	Votes	%	Seats	Notes
1984	List	296,488	5.60	2 / 25	

== See also ==
- List of GroenLinks members of the European Parliament
