= Joost Lagendijk =

Dutch politician

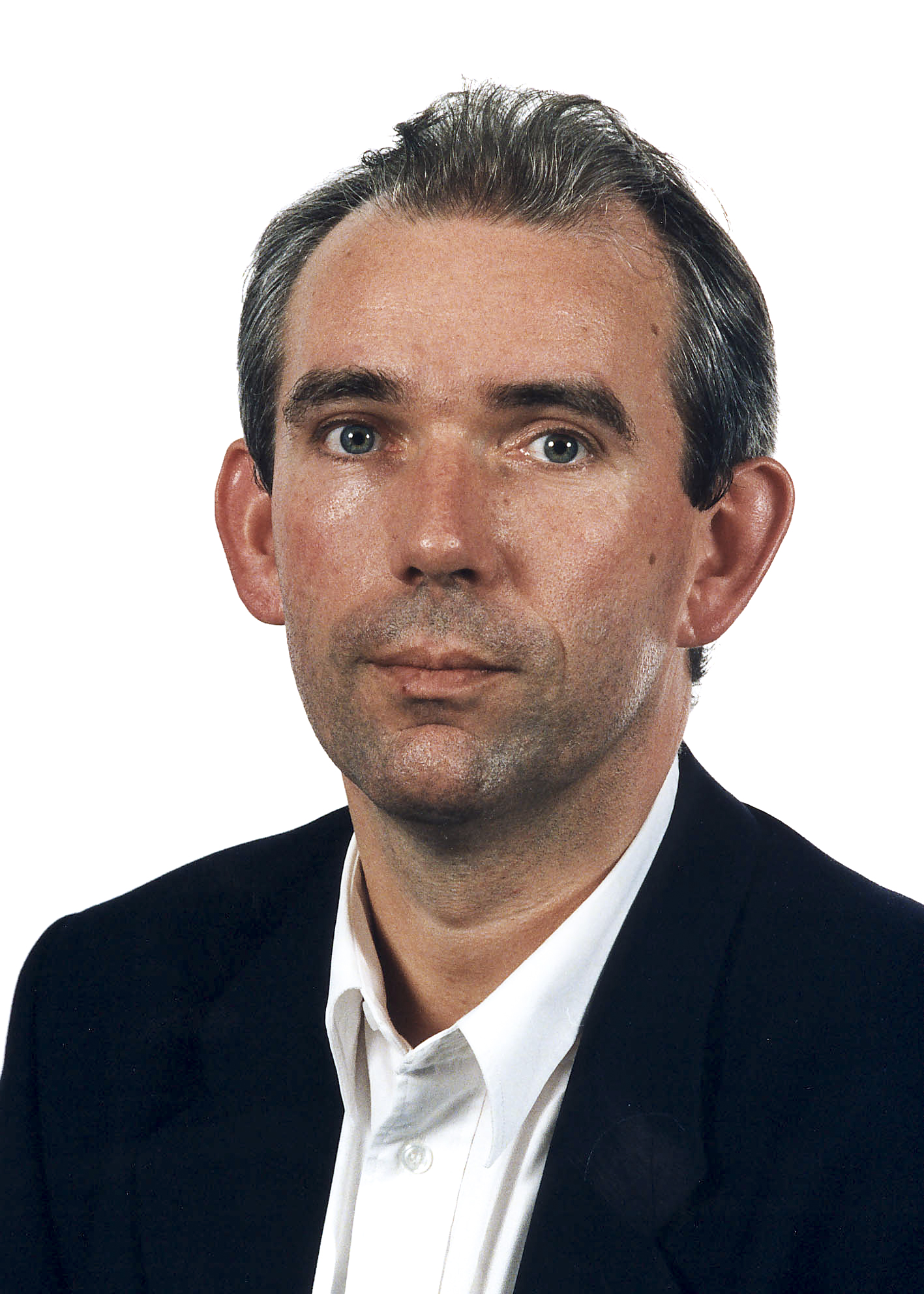
- Lagendijk in 1998

Member of the European Parliament for the Netherlands
- In office 1998 – 14 July 2009
- Preceded by: Nel van Dijk

Personal details
- Born: 8 June 1957 (age 69) Roosendaal, Netherlands
- Party: GroenLinks
- Spouse: Nevin Sungur
- Website: www.joostlagendijk.nl (Archived 28 October 2006)

Joost Lagendijk (Dutch pronunciation: [ˌjoːst ˈlaːɣə(n)ˌdɛik]; born 8 June 1957) is a Dutch politician and columnist. From 2009 to 2012, he was a senior adviser at the Istanbul Policy Center at Sabancı University. He is a former Member of the European Parliament from GroenLinks (G/EFA) and served as the joint chairman of the Turkey-EU Parliamentarians delegation.

== Career before politics ==
After finishing high school Lagendijk studied history at the University of Utrecht. He graduated in 1985. Before graduating Lagendijk worked as a book sales person at the publisher Van Gennep. After graduating Lagendijk became an adviser to the Pacifist Socialist Party (PSP) in the House of Representatives until 1987. He was elected vice-chairman and international secretary of the PSP for the period 1987–1991. During this period he oversaw the merger of the PSP with three other parties into the GroenLinks. He was one of the editors of the GroenLinks's party manifesto of 1991. In addition to international secretary of the PSP, he also was elected international secretary of the GroenLinks for the period 1989–1994. He also founded "De Helling" (The Slope) in 1987 a magazine closely linked to the GroenLinks, he was its publisher until 1990, and one of its writers until 1994.

Professionally he worked for the publisher SUA between 1987 and 1988. In 1988 he became chairman and publisher of the "Tijdschrift Maatschappelijk Welzijn" (Magazine for Social Work). In 1994 he became publisher for Babylon-De Geus.

In 1997, he became GroenLinks's campaign coordinator for the 1998 general elections.

== Political career ==
In 1998, when MEP Nel van Dijk left the European Parliament to become chairperson of the Dutch Bureau against Age Discrimination, he suddenly became MEP. He became a member of the Committee on Foreign Affairs, which he still is, member of the Committee on Transport and Tourism, which he left after 1999 elections, member of the delegation for relations with Russia, which he also left after the elections, and substitute for the Committee on Economic and Monetary Affairs, which he left after the 2004 elections.

In 1999, he headed the GroenLinks electoral list for the European elections. He, and with him three other Dutch Greens, were elected into parliament. After the elections, he became chair of the delegation to the EU–Turkey Joint Parliamentary Committee, which he still is, and thereby a member of the conference of Delegation leaders. He became also member for the delegation for relations with the Southeast European countries, which he left following the 2004 elections.

In a controversial leadership election in 2004, fellow MEP Kathalijne Buitenweg was elected to head the GroenLinks list in the European Elections instead of Lagendijk. After the 2004 elections he became a member of the Subcommittee on Security and Defence, substitute for the Committee on Transport and Tourism and member of the delegation for relations with the Gulf States, including Yemen. He was chair of the Joint Parliamentary Committee with Turkey.

Lagendijk has published two books on European foreign affairs, together with Labour MEP Jan Marinus Wiersma. In 2000 they published "Brussel - Warschau - Kiev. Op zoek naar de grenzen van de Europese Unie" ("Brussels-Warsaw-Kyiv, searching for the borders of the European Union") concerning EU enlargement. In 2004 they published "Na Mars komt Venus. Een Europees antwoord op Bush" ("After Mars comes Venus. A European answer to Bush") concerning the EU's peace and nation-building policy.

As MEP Lagendijk has shown particular interest for the Balkan-region and Turkey, and especially in keeping the peace in this unstable region. His pacifist background is clearly influential there. In December 2005, he visited Turkey to attend the trial against Orhan Pamuk and speak at an event for the Greens of Turkey. In his speech he criticized the military of Turkey for using the violence by the PKK as justification for violence against the Kurdish population. He was then charged with public denigration of the Turkish army. Lagendijk expected pressure by the media in Turkey to force prosecutors to drop charges. Indeed, the prosecutor declined to prosecute, referring to the Turkish constitution and the European Convention on Human Rights, and the case was dropped.

In 2009, Lagendijk left the European Parliament and moved to Istanbul. After briefly writing for the Radikal daily newspaper, Lagendijk started as a columnist for the Today's Zaman newspaper. From 2009 until 2012, he worked as a senior advisor for the Istanbul Policy Center of Sabancı University. Afterwards, he lectured at Süleyman Şah University, until it was closed by the Turkish authorities in the wake of the 2016 Turkish coup d'état attempt.

== Personal life ==
Joost Lagendijk married Nevin Sungur, an award-winning journalist and reporter for the Turkish channel NTV., on 28 October 2006 by the mayor of Beyoğlu, Istanbul, in the famous Pera Palas hotel.

== Denied entry to Turkey ==
On 25 September 2016, Lagendijk, who has permanent residency status in Turkey, was stopped at Sabiha Gökçen Airport in Istanbul when returning from a visit to the Netherlands, denied entry, and forced to return. The reason given for the denial was that, due to "a new regulation", he needed to obtain a visa from the Turkish Embassy in Rotterdam, the Netherlands.
