= Hollanditis =

1981 social movement

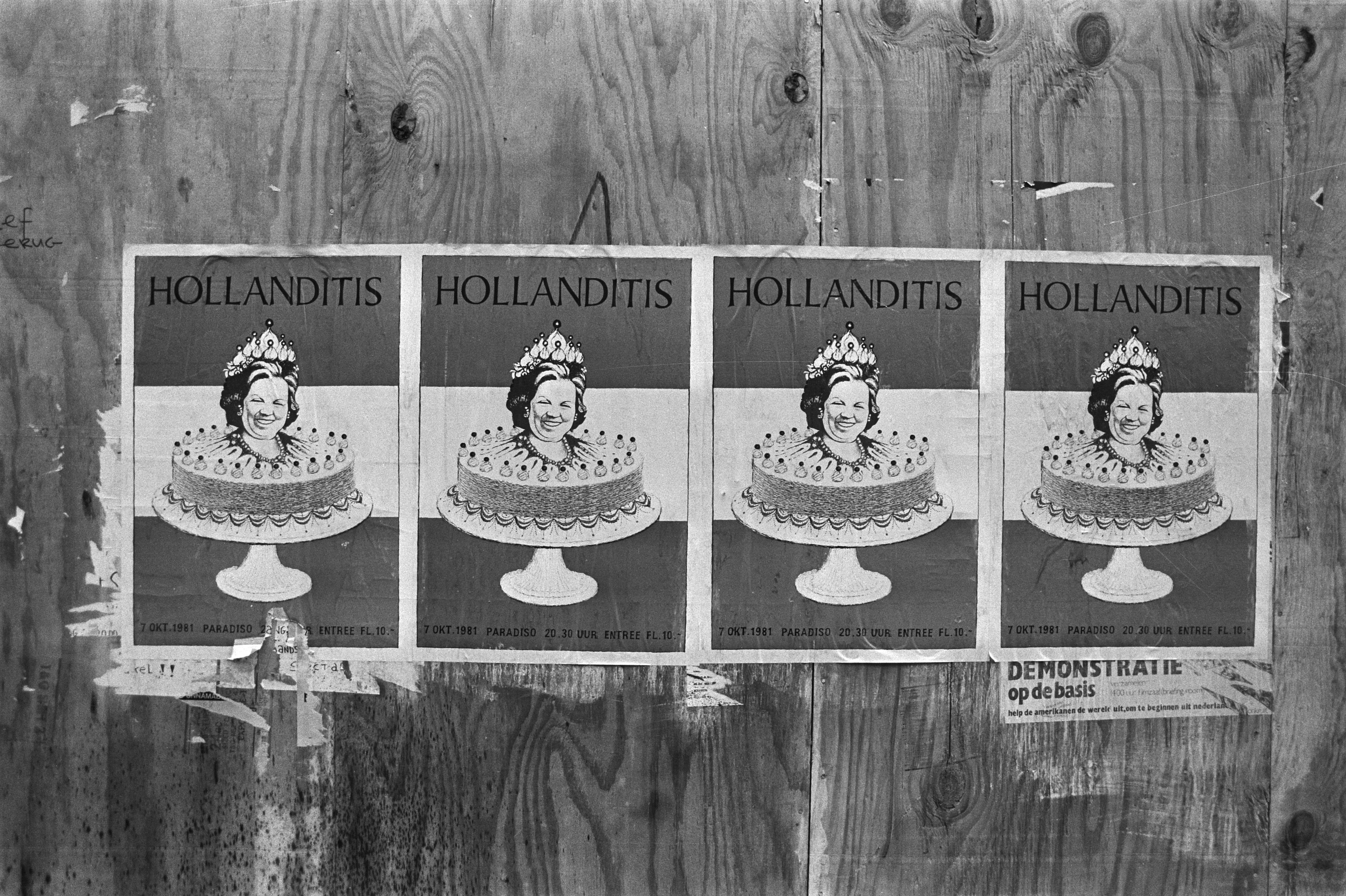
Poster of Hollanditis in 1981. Marcel Antonisse / Anefo

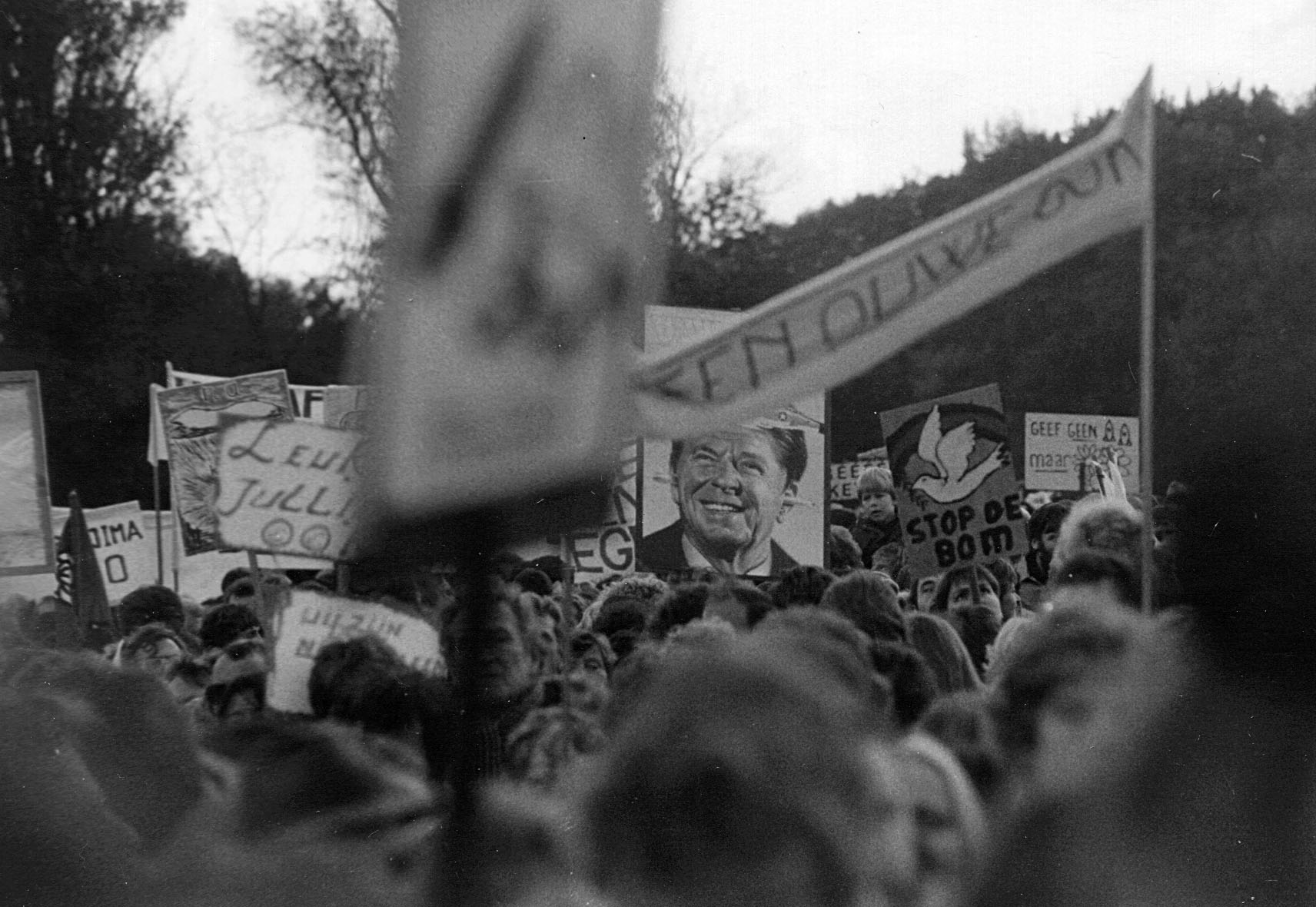
The peace demonstration of 29 October 1983 in The Hague was the biggest ever organised in the Netherlands.

Hollanditis was a term coined in 1981 by the American historian Walter Laqueur. It was used to describe the wave of pacifist neutralism that swept through the Netherlands in the first half of the 1980s and which influenced similar grass roots movements in other European countries. It was the biggest popular movement in the Netherlands in the post-war era and it came as a response to the confrontational politics of the Reagan administration in the US that were seen as a threat to the peaceful co-existence of the 1970s.

The movement gathered pace after a 1981 manifestation against the nuclear arms race in Amsterdam attracted an unexpected 400,000 demonstrators. A coalition of anti-military and peace groups of different persuasions came together and collected over 3.75 million signatures (a quarter of the population) against the deployment on Dutch soil of US cruise missiles that were destined to carry nuclear warheads, in particular neutron bombs, but by the time the petition was presented, the Dutch centre-right government had already given in to the diplomatic pressure from NATO. The movement peaked in 1983 with a mass demonstration in The Hague aimed against the deployment. The demonstration drew a record 550,000 participants and was entirely nonviolent, unlike other anti-nuclear protests of the era.

== See also ==
- Woensdrecht
- Netherlands and weapons of mass destruction
