= GroenLinks =

Political party in the Netherlands

GroenLinks GroenLinks
- Abbreviation: GL
- Founded: 24 November 1990 (as a party)
- Dissolved: 1 July 2026
- Merger of: Rainbow: PSP, CPN, PPR and EVP
- Merged into: Progressief Nederland
- Headquarters: Partijbureau GroenLinks; Sint Jacobsstraat 12, Utrecht
- Think tank: Bureau de Helling
- Youth wing: DWARS
- Membership (2026): ▲62,766
- Ideology: Green politics; Progressivism; Social democracy
- Political position: Centre-left to left-wing
- National affiliation: GroenLinks–PvdA (2023–2026)
- Regional affiliation: Socialists, Greens and Democrats
- European affiliation: European Green Party
- European Parliament group: Greens–European Free Alliance
- International affiliation: Global Greens
- Colours: Green; Red

GroenLinks (Dutch: [ɣrunˈlɪŋks], lit. 'GreenLeft', GL) was a green and social democratic political party in the Netherlands.

It was formed on 1 March 1989 from the merger of four left-wing parties: the Communist Party of the Netherlands, the Pacifist Socialist Party, the Political Party of Radicals and the Evangelical People's Party, which shared left-wing and progressive ideals and had previously co-operated in the Rainbow coalition for the 1989 European Parliament election. After disappointing results in the 1989 and 1994 general election, the nascent party fared particularly well in the 1998 and 2002 elections under the leadership of Paul Rosenmöller, who came to be seen as the unofficial Leader of the Opposition against the first Kok cabinet, a purple government. The party's number of seats fell from ten to four seats in the 2012 election, before increasing to 14 in 2017 and falling back to eight in 2021.

After the 2021 general election, the party intensified cooperation with the Labour Party (PvdA) in an alliance called GroenLinks–PvdA. The two parties participated in both the 2023 and 2025 general elections with a joint candidate list, and currently have a joint parliamentary group of 20 seats. The merged into a single party, called Progressief Nederland, on 1 July 2026.

GroenLinks described itself as "green", "social" and "tolerant". The party's voters were concentrated in larger cities, particularly in university towns.

== History ==
=== Before 1989: predecessors ===
GroenLinks was founded in 1989 as a merger of four parties that were to the left of the Labour Party (PvdA), a social democratic party which has traditionally been the largest centre-left party in the Netherlands. The founding parties were the (formerly-communist) Communist Party of the Netherlands (CPN), the Pacifist Socialist Party (PSP), which originated in the peace movement, the green-influenced Political Party of Radicals (PPR), originally a progressive Christian party, and the progressive Christian Evangelical People's Party. These four parties were frequently classified as "small left"; to indicate their marginal existence. In the 1972 general election, these parties won sixteen seats (out of 150); in the 1977 general election, they only won six. From that moment on, members and voters began to argue for close cooperation.

From the 1980s onwards, the four parties started to cooperate in municipal and provincial elections. As fewer seats are available in these representations, a higher percentage of votes is required to gain a seat. In the 1984 European election, the PPR, CPN and PSP formed the Green Progressive Accord that entered as one into the European elections. They gained one seat, which rotated between the PSP and PPR. Party-members of the four parties also encountered each other in grassroots extraparliamentary protest against nuclear energy and nuclear weapons. More than 80% of the members of the PSP, CPN and PPR attended at least one of the two mass protests against the placement of nuclear weapons, which took place in 1981 and 1983.

The Evangelical People's Party was a relatively new party, founded in 1981, as a splinter group from the Christian Democratic Appeal, the largest party of the Dutch centre-right. During its period in parliament, 1982–1986, it had trouble positioning itself between the small left parties (PSP, PPR and CPN), the PvdA and the CDA.

The increasingly close cooperation between PPR, PSP, CPN and EVP, and the ideological change that accompanied it was not without internal dissent within the parties. The ideological change that CPN made from official communism to 'reformism' led to a split in the CPN; and the subsequent founding of the League of Communists in the Netherlands in 1982. In 1983, a group of "deep" Greens split from the PPR to found The Greens. The CPN and the PPR wanted to form an electoral alliance with the PSP for the 1986 elections. This led to a crisis within the PSP, in which chair of the parliamentary party (Fractievoorzitter) Fred van der Spek, who opposed cooperation, was replaced by Andrée van Es, who favoured cooperation. Van der Spek left the PSP to found his own Party for Socialism and Disarmament. The 1986 PSP congress, however, rejected the electoral alliance.

In the 1986 general election, all four parties lost seats. The CPN and the EVP disappeared from parliament. The PPR was left with two and the PSP with one seat. While the parties were preparing to enter in the 1990 elections separately, the pressure to cooperate increased. In 1989, the PPR, CPN and PSP entered the 1989 European Parliament election with a single list, called the Rainbow. Joost Lagendijk and Leo Platvoet, both PSP party board members, initiated an internal referendum in which the members of the PSP declared to support leftwing cooperation (70% in favour; 64% of all members voting). Their initiative for left-wing cooperation was supported by an open letter from influential members of trade unions (such as Paul Rosenmöller and Karin Adelmund), of environmental movements (e.g., Jacqueline Cramer) and from arts (such as Rudi van Dantzig). This letter called for the formation of a single progressive party to the left of the Labour Party. Lagendijk and Platvoet had been taking part in informal meetings between prominent PSP, PPR and CPN-members, who favoured cooperation. Other participants were PPR chairman Bram van Ojik and former CPN leader Ina Brouwer. These talks were called "F.C. Sittardia" or Cliché bv.

In the spring of 1989, the PSP party board initiated formal talks between the CPN, the PSP and the PPR about a common list for the upcoming general elections. It soon became clear that the CPN wanted to maintain an independent communist identity and not merge into a new left-wing formation. This was reason for the PPR leaving the talks. Negotiations about cooperation were reopened after the fall of the second Lubbers cabinet and the announcement that elections would be held in the autumn of that year. This time the EVP was included in the discussion. The PPR was represented for a short while by an informal delegation led by former chair Wim de Boer, because the party board did not want to be seen re-entering the negotiations it had left only a short while earlier. In the summer of 1989, the party congresses of all four parties accepted to enter the elections with a shared programme and list of candidates. Additionally, the association GroenLinks (Dutch: Vereniging GroenLinks; VGL) was set up to allow sympathisers, not member of any of the four parties to join. Meanwhile, the European elections of 1989 were held, in which the same group of parties had entered as a single list under the name "Rainbow". In practice, the merger of the parties had now happened and the party GroenLinks was officially founded on 24 November 1990.

=== 1989–1994: completion of the merge and first term in parliament ===
1989 election poster showing the old logo in which the pink lines and the blue spaces forming allude to a peace sign.

In the 1989 elections, the PPR, PSP, CPN and EVP entered in the elections with one single list called Groen Links. In the Netherlands, parties usually participate in the elections with one list for the whole country. The candidates on top of the list get the priority for the distribution of seats won. The GroenLinks list of candidates was organised in such a way that all the parties were represented and new figures could enter. The PPR, which had been the largest party in 1986 got the top candidate (the lead candidate, Ria Beckers) and the number five; the PSP got the numbers two and six, the CPN the number three and the EVP number eleven. The first independent candidate was Paul Rosenmöller, trade unionist from Rotterdam, on the fourth place. In the elections, the party doubled its seats in comparison to 1986 (from three to six), but the expectations had been much higher. In the 1990 municipal elections, the party fared much better, strengthening the resolve to cooperate.

In the period 1989–1991, the merger developed further. A board was organised for the party-in-foundation and also a 'GroenLinks Council', which was supposed to control the board and the parliamentary party and stimulate the process of merger. In this council, all five groups – CPN, PPR, PSP, EVP and the Vereniging Groen Links – had seats on ratio of the number of their members. Originally, the three youth organisations, the CPN-linked General Dutch Youth League, the PSP-linked Pacifist Socialist Young Working Groups and the PPR-linked Political Party of Radical Youth refused to merge, but under pressure of the government (who controlled their subsidies) they did merge to form DWARS. In 1990, some opposition formed against the moderate, green course of GroenLinks. Several former PSP members united in the "Left Forum" in 1992 – they would leave the party to join former PSP-leader Van der Spek to found the PSP'92. Similarly, former members of the CPN joined the League of Communists in the Netherlands to found the New Communist Party–NCPN in the same year. In 1991, the congresses of the four founding parties (PSP, PPR, CPN and EVP) decided to officially abolish their parties.

GroenLinks had considerable problems formulating its own ideology. In 1990, the attempt to write the first manifesto of principles failed because of the difference between socialists and communists on the one side and the more liberal former PPR members on the other side. The second manifesto of principles – which was not allowed to be called that – was adopted after a lengthy debate and many amendments in 1991.

Although the party was internally divided, the GroenLinks parliamentary party was the only party in the Dutch parliament which opposed the Gulf War. A debate within the party about the role military intervention led to a more-nuanced standpoint than the pacifism of some of its predecessors: GroenLinks would support peacekeeping missions as long as they were mandated by the United Nations.

In the fall of 1990, MEP Verbeek announced that he would not, as he had promised, leave the European Parliament after two-and-a-half years to make room for a new candidate. He would continue as an independent and remain in parliament until 1994. In the 1994 European elections, he would run unsuccessfully as top candidate of The Greens.

In 1992, party leader Ria Beckers left the House of Representatives because she wanted more private time. Peter Lankhorst replaced her as chair ad interim, but he announced that he would not take part in the internal elections.

=== 1994–2002: opposition during the purple cabinets ===
1994 election posters showing the duo Rabbae/Brouwer. The text reads: "GroenLinks counts double"

Before the general election of 1994, GroenLinks organised an internal election on the party's political leadership. Two duos entered: Ina Brouwer (former CPN) combined with Mohammed Rabbae (independent), while Paul Rosenmöller (independent) formed a combination with Leoni Sipkes (former PSP); there were also five individual candidates, including Wim de Boer (former chair of the PPR and member of the Senate), Herman Meijer (former CPN, future chair of the party) and Ineke van Gent (former PSP and future MP).

Some candidates ran in duos because they wanted to combine family life with politics. Brouwer, Rosenmöller and Sipkes already were MPs for GroenLinks, whilst Rabbae was new – he had been chair of the Dutch Centre for Foreigners. In the first round, the duos ended up ahead of the others, but neither had an absolute majority. A second round was needed, in which Brouwer and Rabbae won with 51%. Brouwer became the first candidate and Rabbae second, the second duo Rosenmöller and Sipkes occupied the following place followed by Marijke Vos, former chair of the party. The idea of a dual lead candidacy did not communicate well to the voters. GroenLinks lost one seat, leaving only five. Yet in the same election, the centre-left Labour Party also lost a lot of seats.

After the disappointing elections, Brouwer left parliament. She was replaced as party leader by Paul Rosenmöller and her seat was taken by Tara Singh Varma. The charismatic Rosenmöller became the "unofficial leader" of the opposition against the first Kok cabinet because the largest opposition party, the Christian Democratic Appeal, was unable to adapt well to its new role as opposition party. Rosenmöller set out a new strategy: GroenLinks should offer alternatives instead of only rejecting the proposals made by the government.

In the 1998 general election, GroenLinks more than doubled its seats to eleven. The charisma of "unofficial leader" Rosenmöller played an important role in this. Many new faces entered parliament, including Femke Halsema, a political talent who had left the Labour Party for GroenLinks in 1997. The party began to speculate openly about joining government after the elections of 2002.

The 1999 Kosovo War divided the party internally. The parliamentary party in the House of Representatives supported the NATO intervention, while the Senate parliamentary party was against the intervention. Several former PSP members within the House of Representatives parliamentary party began to openly speak out their doubts about the intervention. A compromise was found: GroenLinks would support the intervention as long as it limited itself to military targets. Prominent members of the founding parties including Marcus Bakker and Joop Vogt left the party over this issue.

In February 2001, Roel van Duijn and a few former members of The Greens joined GroenLinks.

In 2001, the integrity of former MP Tara Singh Varma came into doubt: it was revealed that she had lied about her illness and that she had made promises to development organisations which she did not fulfill. In 2000, she had left parliament because as she claimed, she had only a few months to live before she would die of cancer. The TROS program "Opgelicht" (In English "Framed") revealed that she had lied and that she did not have cancer. Later, she apologised on public television and claimed she suffered from post-traumatic stress disorder.

In the same year, the parliamentary party supported the invasion of Afghanistan after the terrorist attacks of September 11. This invasion led to great upheaval within the party. Several former PSP members within the House of Representatives parliamentary party began to openly speak out their doubts about the intervention. Under pressure of internal opposition, led by former PSP members and the party's youth organisation DWARS, the parliamentary party changed its position: the attacks should be cancelled.

=== 2002–2021 ===
The 2002 general election was characterised by changes in the political climate. The right-wing populist political commentator Pim Fortuyn entered into politics. He had an anti-establishment message, combined with a call for restrictions on immigration. Although his critique was oriented at the second Kok cabinet, Rosenmöller was one of the few politicians who could muster some resistance against his message. Days before the election, Fortuyn was assassinated. Ab Harrewijn, GroenLinks MP and candidate also died. Before and after the elections serious threats were made against Rosenmöller, his wife and his children. These events caused considerable stress for Rosenmöller. GroenLinks lost one seat in the election, although it had gained more votes than in the 1998 elections. Before the 2003 general election Rosenmöller left parliament, citing the ongoing threats against his life and those of his family as the main reason. He was replaced as chair of the parliamentary party and top candidate by Femke Halsema. She was unable to keep ten seats and lost two.

In 2003, GroenLinks almost unanimously turned against the Iraq War. It took part in the protests against the war, for instance by organising its party congress in Amsterdam at the day of the large demonstration, with an interval allowing its members to join the protest.

At the end of 2003, Halsema temporarily left parliament to give birth to her twins. During her absence Marijke Vos took her place as chair of the parliamentary party. When she returned to parliament, Halsema started a discussion about the principles of her party. She emphasised individual freedom, tolerance, self-realisation and emancipation. In one interview she called her party "the last liberal party of the Netherlands". This led to considerable attention of media and other observers, which speculated about an ideological change. In 2005 the party's scientific bureau published the book "Vrijheid als Ideaal" ("Freedom as Ideal") in which prominent opinion-makers explored the new political space and the position of the left within that space. During the congress of February 2007 the party board was ordered to organise a party-wide discussion about the party's principles.

During the European Elections congress of 2004, the candidacy committee proposed that the chair of the GroenLinks delegation, Joost Lagendijk, should become the party's lead candidate in those elections. A group of members, led by Senator Leo Platvoet submitted a motion "We want to choose". They wanted a serious choice for such an important office. The party's board announced a new electoral procedure. During the congress Kathalijne Buitenweg, an MEP and candidate, announced wish to be considered for the position of top candidate. She narrowly won the elections from Lagendijk. This came as a great surprise to all. Especially for Buitenweg who had not written an acceptance speech and read out Lagendijk's.

In May 2005, MP Farah Karimi wrote a book in which discussed in detail how she had taken part in the Iranian Revolution, because this information was already known by the party board this did not lead to any upheaval. In November 2005, the party board asked Senator Sam Pormes to give up his seat. Continuing rumours about his involvement with guerrilla-training in Yemen in the 1970s and the 1977 train hijacking by Moluccan youth and allegations of welfare fraud were harmful for the party, or at least so the party board claimed.

When Pormes refused to step down, the party board threatened to expel him. Pormes fought this decision. The party council of March 2006 sided with Pormes. Party chair Herman Meijer felt forced to resign. He was succeeded by Henk Nijhof who was chosen by the party council in May 2006. In November 2006 Pormes left the Senate, he was replaced by Goos Minderman.

2006 election posters showing Halsema. The text reads: Grow along, GroenLinks. The turret is the official working office of the Dutch Prime Minister.

In the 2006 Dutch municipal election, the party stayed relatively stable, losing only a few seats. After the elections GroenLinks took part in 75 local executives, including Amsterdam where MP Marijke Vos became an alderwoman.

In preparation of the 2006 general election the party held a congress in October. It elected Halsema, again the only candidate, as the party's top candidate. MEP Kathalijne Buitenweg and comedian Vincent Bijlo were last candidates. In the 2006 elections the party lost one seat.

In the subsequent cabinet formation, an initial exploratory round among the Christian Democratic Appeal (CDA), Labour Party (PvdA) and Socialist Party (SP) failed, Halsema announced that GroenLinks would not be involved in further discussion at that point in time, as the party lost, was too small, and had less in common with CDA than the SP had. Following this decision an internal debate about the political course and the leadership of Halsema re-erupted. The debate does not just concern the series of lost elections and the decision not to participate in the formation talks, but also the elitist image of the party, the new liberal course, initiated by Halsema, and the lack of party democracy. Since the last weeks of January 2007 several prominent party members have voiced their doubts including former leader Ina Brouwer, Senator Leo Platvoet and MEP Joost Lagendijk. In reaction to this the party board has set up a commission led by former MP and chair of the PPR Bram van Ojik. They looked into the lost series of elections. In the summer of 2007 another committee was formed to organise a larger debate about the course of the party's principles, organisation and strategy. Van Ojik also led this committee. The committee implemented a motion already adopted by the party's congress in 2006 to re-evaluate the party's principle in light of the party's course started by Halsema in 2004. Over the course of 2007 and 2008 the committee organised an internal debate about the party's principles, organisation and strategy. In November 2008 this led to the adoption of a new manifesto of principles.

In August 2008, GroenLinks parliamentarian Wijnand Duyvendak published a book in which he admitted to a burglary of the Ministry of Economic Affairs in order to steal plans for nuclear power plants. This led to his resignation on 14 August, after media reported that the burglary also led to threats against civil servants. He was replaced by Jolande Sap.

In 2008, MEPs Joost Lagendijk and Kathalijne Buitenweg announced that they would not seek a new term in the European Parliament. The party had to elect a new lead candidate for the 2009 European elections. There were five candidates for this position: Amsterdam city councillor Judith Sargentini, former MEP Alexander de Roo, senator Tineke Strik, environmental researcher Bas Eickhout and Niels van den Berge assistant of MEP Buitenweg. In an internal referendum Sargentini was elected. The party congress put Eickhout on a second position on the list.

On 18 April 2010, the party congress composed the list of candidates for the 2010 general election. Two sitting MPs Ineke van Gent and Femke Halsema were granted dispensation to stand for a fourth term. Halsema was re-elected as party leader. Van Gent was put as fifth on the party list. All of the first five candidates were sitting MPs and four were women. Their other high newcomers were former Greenpeace director Liesbeth van Tongeren and chairman of CNV youth Jesse Klaver. The party won 10 seats in the election and participated in the formation talks of a Green/Purple government. Halsema resigned as party leader when these talks failed and was succeeded by Jolande Sap.

In the 2012 general election, GroenLinks lost six seats and was left with four out of 150 seats. Following the disappointing result, Sap was forced to resign as party leader and was succeeded by Bram van Ojik, who in turn handed his position to Jesse Klaver in 2015. Under Klaver's leadership, GroenLinks gradually rose in polls before climbing to an all-time high of 14 seats in the 2017 general election. The party entered coalition talks with the People's Party for Freedom and Democracy, the Christian Democratic Appeal and Democrats 66; however, talks failed after Klaver demanded more refugees to be accepted.

=== 2021–2026: Collaboration with PvdA and merger ===
GroenLinks lost the 2021 general election, and combined with the Labour Party during the subsequent government formation. There have been discussions about a merger with that party; they participated in the 2023 Dutch Senate election as a unified party list. GroenLinks and the Labour Party announced in 2023 that they would also participate as a unified party list, GroenLinks–PvdA, in the general election of 2023, as members of both parties voted in favour of an alliance. With PvdA's Frans Timmermans as lead candidate, GroenLinks–PvdA eventually won 25 seats in the elections, gaining eight seats and becoming the largest opposition party to the Schoof cabinet. On 12 June 2025, members of GroenLinks voted in favour of another joint list for the general election of 2025, as well as a merger with the Labour Party into a new party, Progressive Netherlands, in 2026. GroenLinks and PvdA formally merged on 1 July 2026.

== Ideology and issues ==
=== Ideology ===
The party combined green and left-wing ideals. The core ideals of GroenLinks were codified in the party's programme of principles (called Partij voor de Toekomst, "Party for the Future"). The party placed itself in the freedom-loving tradition of the left. Its principles included:

- The protection of the Earth, ecosystems and a respectful treatment of animals.
- A fair distribution of natural resources between all citizens of the world and all generations.
- A just distribution of income and fair chance for everyone to work, care, education and recreation.
- A pluralist society where everyone can participate in freedom. The party combines openness with a sense of community.
- Strengthening the international rule of law, in order to ensure peace and respect for human rights.

The party's principles reflected the ideological convergence between the four founding parties which came from different ideological traditions: the Political Party of Radicals and the Evangelical People's Party, from a progressive Christian tradition; and the Pacifist Socialist Party and the Communist Party of the Netherlands from the socialist and communist traditions. Over the course of the 1970s and 1980s, the parties had come to embrace environmentalism and feminism; they all favoured democratisation of society and had opposed the creation of new nuclear plants and the placement of new nuclear weapons in the Netherlands.

Halsema, the former political leader of the party, started a debate about the ideological course of GroenLinks. She emphasised the freedom-loving tradition of the left and chose freedom as a key value. Her course is called left-liberal by herself and observers, although Halsema herself claims that she does not want to force an ideological change.

Following Isaiah Berlin, Halsema distinguishes between positive and negative freedom. According to Halsema, negative freedom is the freedom of citizens from government influence; she applies this concept especially to the multicultural society and the rechtsstaat, where the government should protect the rights of citizens and not limit them. Positive freedom is the emancipation of citizens from poverty and discrimination. Halsema wants to apply this concept to welfare state and the environment where government should take more action. According to Halsema, GroenLinks was an undogmatic party.

=== Proposals ===
The election manifesto for the 2010 elections was adopted in April of that year. It was titled Klaar voor de Toekomst ("Prepared for the Future"). The manifesto emphasises international cooperation, welfare state reform, environmental policy and social tolerance.

GroenLinks considered itself a "social reform party", which aims to reform the government finances and increase the position of "outsiders" on the labour market, such as migrant youth, single parents, workers with short term-contracts and people with disabilities. It disagrees with the parties on the right which, in the eyes of GroenLinks, were only oriented towards cutting costs and did not offer the worst-off a chance for work, emancipation and participation. But, unlike the other opposition parties of the left, the party did not want to defend the current welfare state – which the party calls "powerless", because it merely offers the worst-off a benefit rather than prospects for work. The party wanted to reform the Dutch welfare state so it will benefit "outsiders" – those who have been excluded from the welfare state until now.

To increase employment, the GroenLinks proposed a participation contract, where unemployment recipients signed an agreement with their local council to become involved in volunteer work, schooling, or work experience projects – for which they get paid minimum wage. The unemployment benefit should be increased and limited to one year. In this period, people would have to look for a job or education. If at the end of the year one should not succeed in finding a job, the government will offer one a job for the minimum wage. In order to create more employment, they want to implement the green tax shift which will lower taxes on lower paid labour. This would be compensated by higher taxes on pollution. In order to increase prospects for the underprivileged, it wanted to invest in education, especially the vmbo (middle-level vocational education). In order to ensure that migrants have a better chance for jobs, it wanted to deal firmly with discrimination, especially on the labour market. The party wanted to decrease income differences by making child benefits. The party favoured reform of government pensions: after 45 years of employment, one should get the right to a pension. If one starts working young, one is able to stop working earlier than if one starts working when one is older. Receiving unemployment or disability benefits is counted as work, as is caring for children or family members. The system of mortgage interest deductions should be abolished over a forty-year period.

International cooperation was an important theme for the party. This includes development cooperation with underdeveloped countries. GroenLinks wanted to increase spending on development aid to 0.8% of the gross national product. It wanted to open the European markets to goods from Third World countries, under conditions of fair trade. In order to ensure free and fair trade, it wanted to increase and democratise international economic organisations such as the International Monetary Fund and the World Bank. The party also favoured greater international control over financial markets. GroenLinks favoured European integration, but was critical about the current policies of the European Commission. It favoured the European Constitution, but after it was voted down in the 2005 referendum, GroenLinks advocated a new treaty which emphasised democracy and subsidiarity. The party was critical about the war on terror. It wanted to strengthen the peacekeeping powers of the United Nations and reform the Dutch armed forces into a peace force, with the functions of NATO to be taken over by the European Union and the United Nations.

GroenLinks wanted to solve environmental problems, especially climate change, by stimulating durable alternatives. The party wanted to use taxes and emissions trading to stimulate alternative energy as an alternative to both fossil fuel and nuclear plants. It wanted to close all nuclear plants in the Netherlands and impose a tax on the use of coal in energy production, in order to discourage the building of new coal-based power plants. Moreover, it wanted to stimulate energy saving. It wanted to invest in clean public transport, as an alternative to private transport. Investments in public transport can be financed by not expanding highways and imposing tolls on the use of roads (called rekeningrijden). The party wanted to stimulate organic farming through taxes as an alternative to industrial agriculture. Moreover, GroenLinks wanted to codify animal rights in the Constitution.

GroenLinks valued individual freedom and the rule of law. The party wanted to legalise soft drugs. It wanted to protect civil rights on the Internet by extending constitutional protection for free communication to email and other modern technologies. It also favoured a reform of copyright to allow non-commercial reproduction and the use of open-source software in the public sector. In the long term, it sought to abolish the monarchy and create a republic. It also favoured a reduction of the size of the government bureaucracy, for instance by decreasing the number of Dutch ministries and abolishing the Senate. Finally, GroenLinks favoured liberal immigration and asylum policies. It wanted to empower victims of human trafficking by giving them a residence permit and it wanted to abolish the income requirements for marriage migration.

In the party's 2021 election programme, it stated that it wanted to introduce a basic income for all Dutch citizens within eight years.

== Election results ==
=== House of Representatives ===
Election	Lead candidate	List	Votes	%	Seats	+/–	Government
1989	Ria Beckers	List	362,304	4.1	6 / 150	▲3	Opposition
1994	Ina Brouwer	List	311,399	3.5	5 / 150	▼1	Opposition
1998	Paul Rosenmöller	List	625,968	7.3	11 / 150	▲6	Opposition
2002	Paul Rosenmöller	List	660,692	7.0	10 / 150	▼1	Opposition
2003	Femke Halsema	List	495,802	5.1	8 / 150	▼2	Opposition
2006	Femke Halsema	List	453,054	4.6	7 / 150	▼1	Opposition
2010	Femke Halsema	List	628,096	6.7	10 / 150	▲3	Opposition
2012	Jolande Sap	List	219,896	2.3	4 / 150	▼6	Opposition
2017	Jesse Klaver	List	959,600	9.1	14 / 150	▲10	Opposition
2021	Jesse Klaver	List	537,584	5.2	8 / 150	▼6	Opposition

=== Senate ===
Election	Votes	Weight	%	Seats	+/–
1991				4 / 75	▲1
1995				4 / 75	Steady
1999				8 / 75	▲4
2003		10,866	6.7	5 / 75	▼3
2007		9,074	5.6	4 / 75	▼1
2011		10,757	6.5	5 / 75	▲1
2015	30	9,520	5.6	4 / 75	▼1
2019	65	19,363	11.2	8 / 75	▲4
2023	55	17,313	9.7	7 / 75	▼1

=== European Parliament ===
Election	List	Vote	%	Seats	+/–	EP Group
1994	List	154,362	3.74	1 / 31	New	G
1999	List	419,869	11.85	4 / 31	▲3	Greens-EFA
2004	List	352,201	7.39	2 / 27	▼2	Greens-EFA
2009	List	404,020	8.87	3 / 25	▲1	Greens-EFA
2009	List	404,020	8.87	3 / 26	0	Greens-EFA
2014	List	329,906	6.98	2 / 26	▼1	Greens-EFA
2019	List	599,283	10.90	3 / 26	▲1	Greens-EFA
2019	List	599,283	10.90	3 / 29	0	Greens-EFA

=== Provincial ===
Election	Votes	%	Seats	Change	Involved in Executives
1991			36 / 758		
1995			34 / 758	▼2	
1999			50 / 764		
2003			37 / 564		1 / 12
2007			33 / 564	▼4	2 / 12
2011		6.30	34 / 566	▲1	2 / 12
2015	324,572	5.35	30 / 570	▼4	2 / 12
2019	783,006	10.76	61 / 570	▲31	8 / 12
2023 (Note: Contested as part of GroenLinks–PvdA in Zeeland.)	694,678	8.96	51 / 533	▼10	5 / 11

== Representation ==
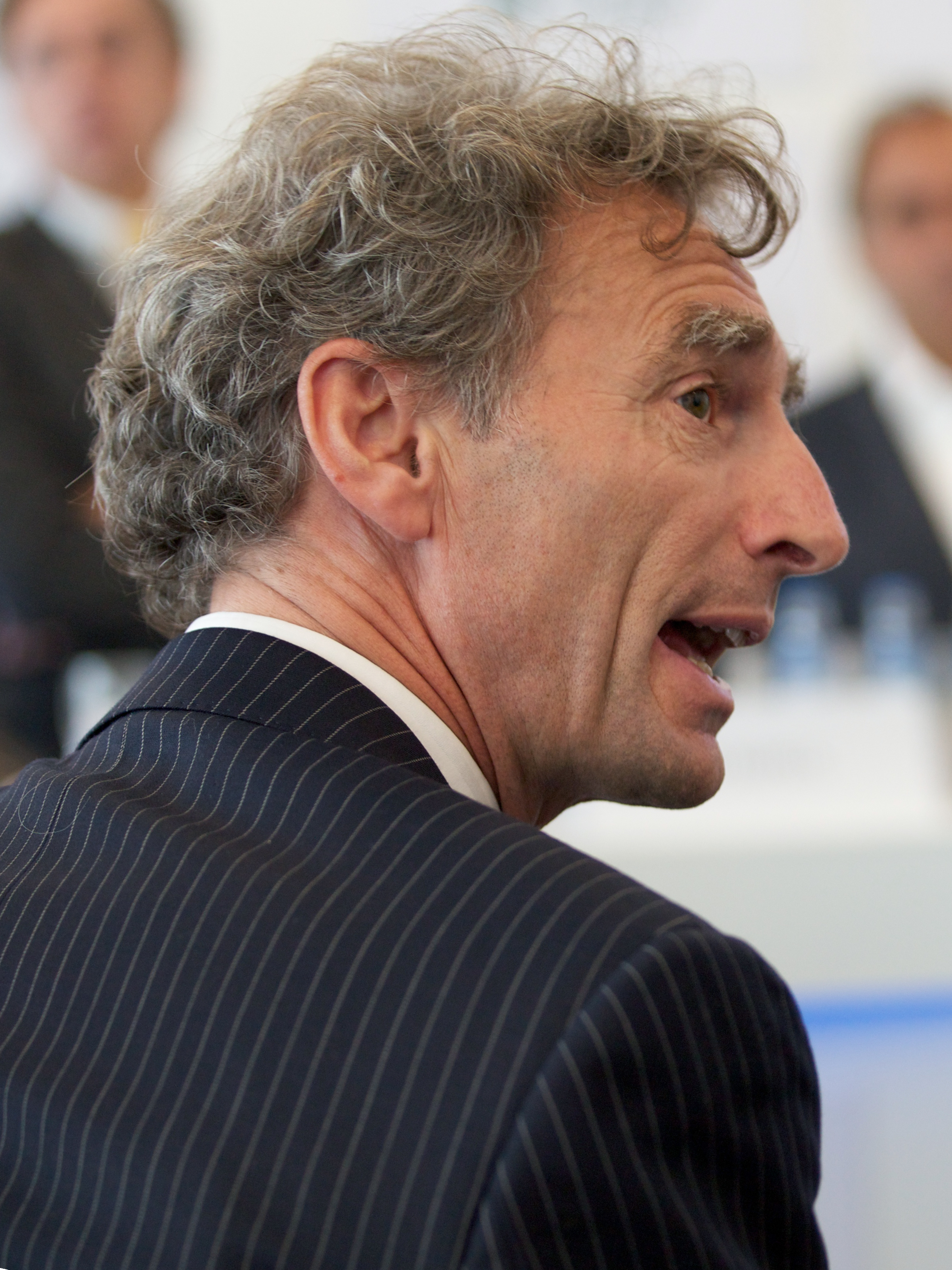
Senate group leader Paul Rosenmöller

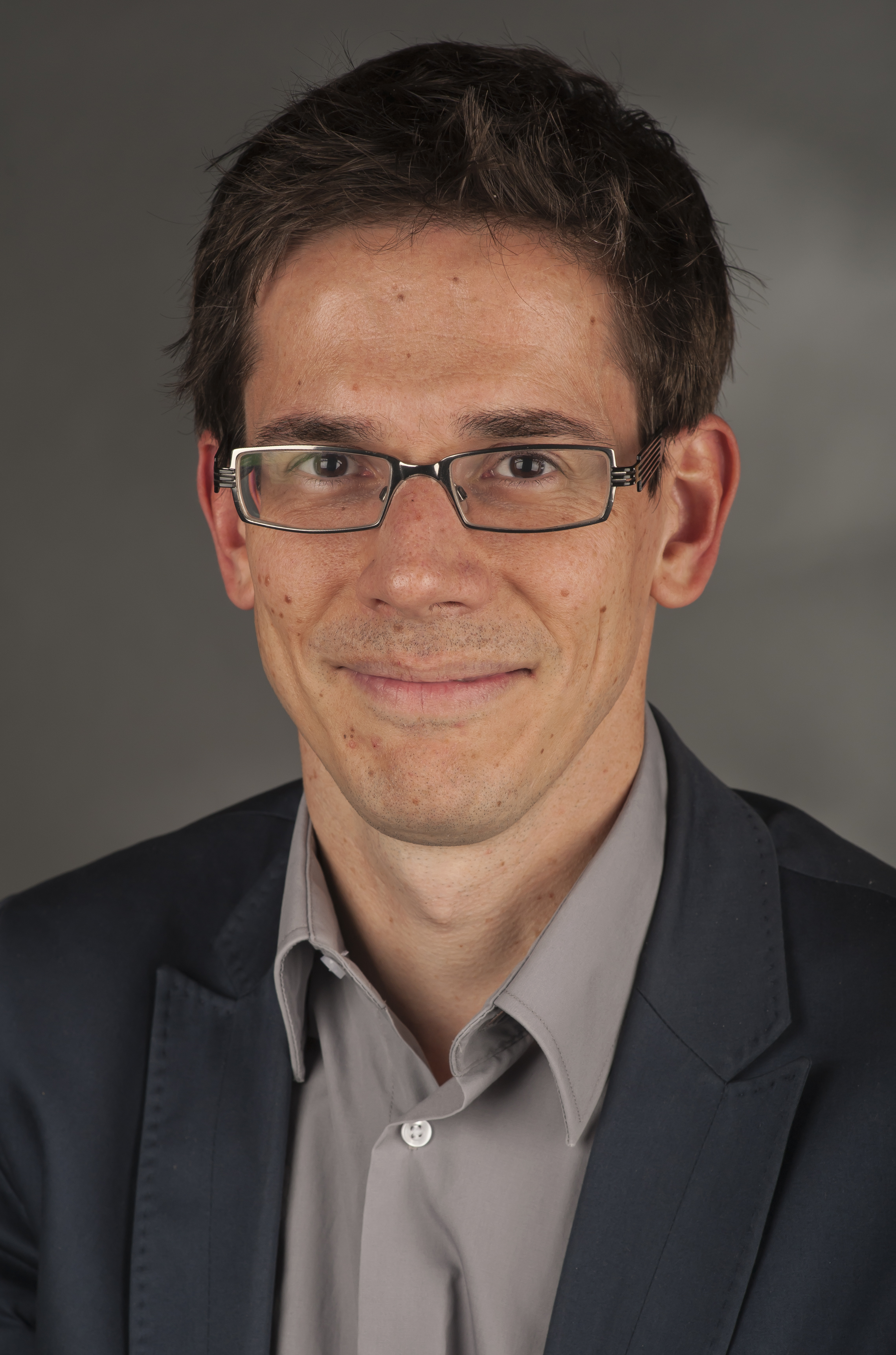
EP-delegation leader Bas Eickhout

== Electorate ==
According to a survey done in 2006 more women vote for GroenLinks than men by a margin of 20%. The party also disproportionately appeals to gay voters. The party also polls well among migrant voters, especially those from Turkey and Morocco, where its support is twice as high as in the general population.

GroenLinks voters have an eccentric position in their preferences for particular policies. Between 1989 and 2003 they were the most leftwing voters in the Netherlands, often a little more to the left than voters of the SP. These voters are in favor of the redistribution of wealth, free choice for euthanasia, opening the borders for asylum seekers, the multicultural society and are firmly against building new nuclear plants.

GroenLinks has the second-largest proportion of vegan/vegetarian voters of any political party in the Netherlands, with 8.4% or 16.9% of GroenLinks voters in saying in 2 surveys in 2021 that they did not eat meat. The party with the highest proportion of vegan/vegetarian voters in both surveys was the Party for the Animals, for which the share laid at 17.3% or 27.9%.

== Style and campaign ==
The logo of GroenLinks is the name of the party with the word "Green" written in red and the word "Left" written in green since 1994. Additional colours used in the logo are white, yellow and blue. An earlier logo, used between 1989 and 1994, and which can be seen on the poster above showed a variation of a peace sign projected on a green triangle on which "PPR PSP CPN EVP" was written and next to it GroenLinks in green and pink.

From 2007 onwards, GroenLinks has adopted the idea of a "permanent campaign", which implies that campaign activities are held even when there is no immediate connection to an election. Permanent campaign activities are intended to create and maintain a base level of sympathy and knowledge about the party platform.

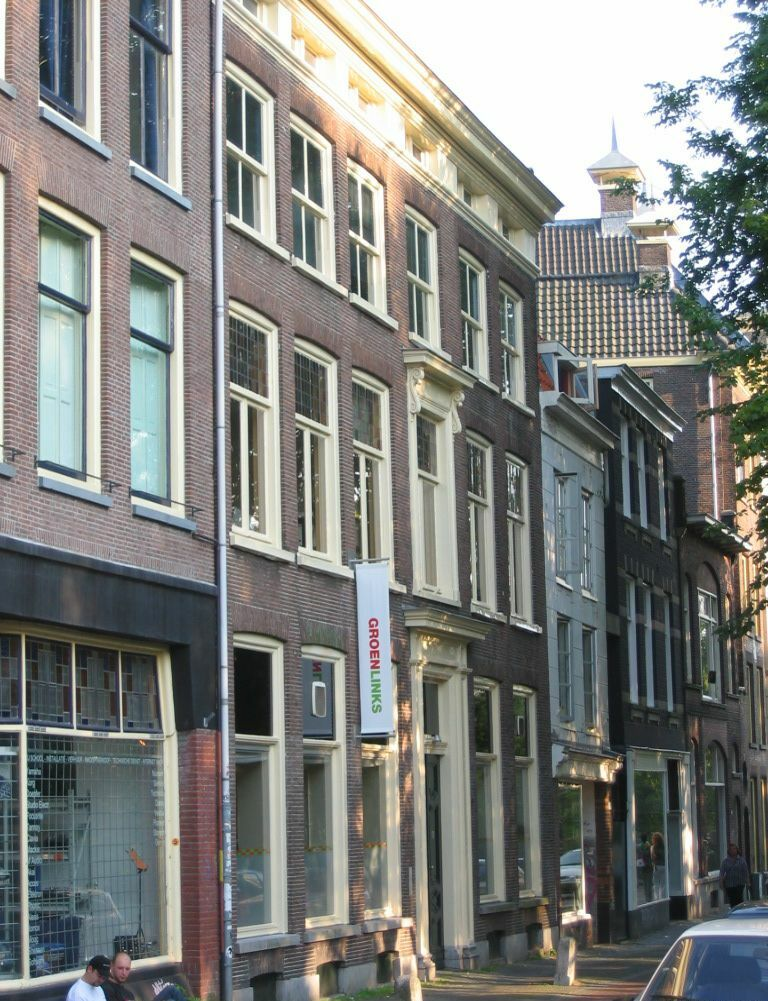
Former party Bureau of GroenLinks in Utrecht

== Organisation ==
=== Name and logo ===
The name "GroenLinks" (until 1992 "Groen Links" with a space between Groen and Links) is a compromise between the PPR and the CPN and the PSP. The PPR wanted the word "Green" in the name of the party, the PSP and the CPN the word "Left". It also emphasises the core ideals of the party, environmental sustainability and social justice.

In 1984, the common list of the PPR, PSP and CPN for the 1984 European elections was called Green Progressive Accord – at that time the PPR did not want to accept the word "left" in the name of the political combination. The parties had entered in the 1989 European elections as the Rainbow (Regenboog), in reference to the Rainbow Group in the European Parliament between 1984 and 1989.

Logo from 1989 to 1994

Current logo

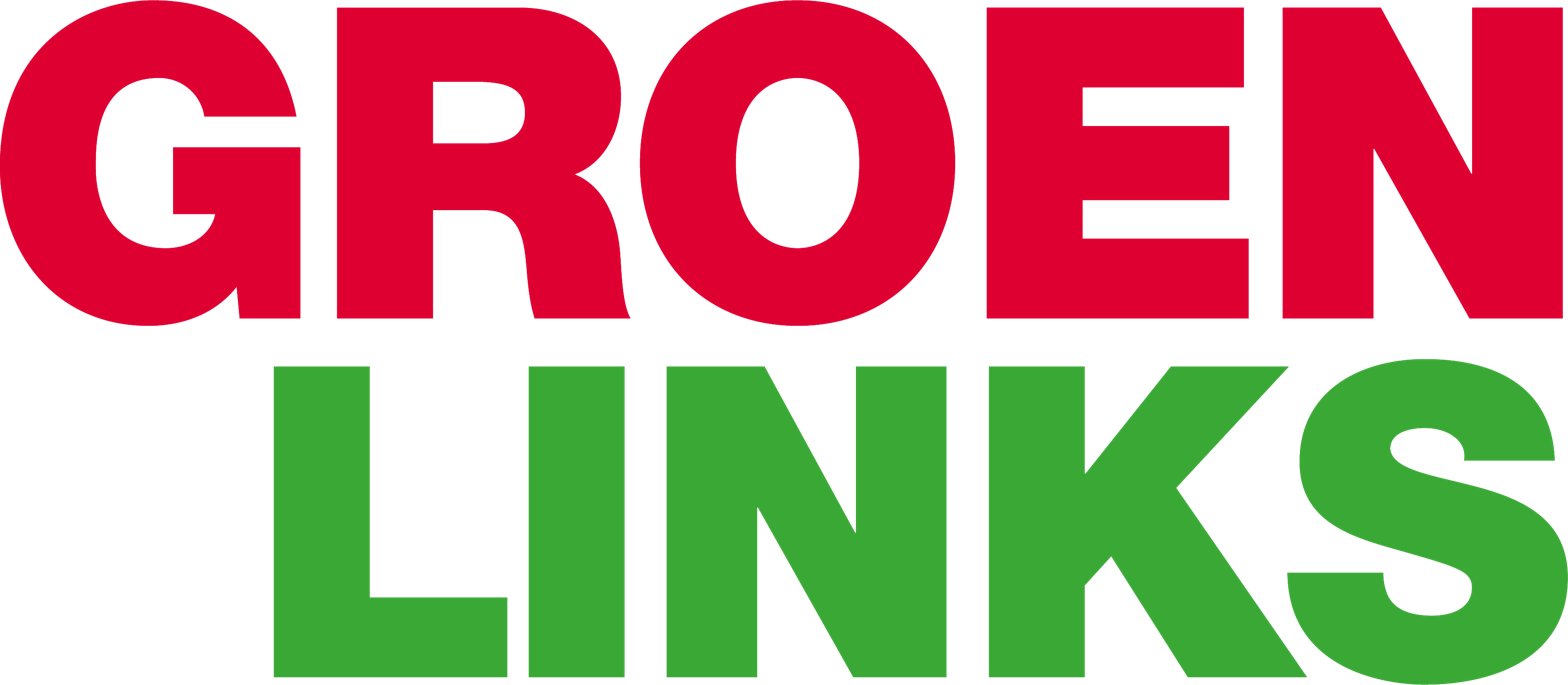
Variant logo

=== Organisational structure ===
The highest organ of GroenLinks is the party congress, which is open to all members. The congress elects the party-board, it decides on the order of the candidates for national and European elections and it has a final say over the party platform. The congress convenes at least once every year in spring or when needed.

The party board consists of fifteen members who are elected for a two-year term. The chairperson of this board is the only paid position on the board, the others are unpaid. The chairperson together with four other board members (the vice-chair, the treasurer, the secretary, the European secretary and the international secretary) handles the daily affairs and meet every two weeks while the other ten board members meet only once a month.

For the months that the congress does not convene, a party council takes over its role. It consists out of 80 representatives of all the 250 municipal branches. The party board and the nationally elected representatives of the party are responsible to the party council. It has the right to fill vacancies in the board, make changes to the party constitution and takes care of the party's finances. Politicians are required to donate 10% of their gross income to the party, making GroenLinks one of the top recipients of donations among Dutch political parties.

There are several independent organisations which are linked to GroenLinks:

- DWARS, the independent youth organisation of GroenLinks
- De Linker Wang ("The Left Cheek"), platform for Religion and Politics, which is a progressive Christian platform, which was formed by former members of the Evangelical People's Party.
- Scientific Bureau GroenLinks, the independent political think tank which publishes "De Helling" (Dutch for "the Slope").
- PinkLeft, an LGBT organisation for GroenLinks members.

GroenLinks is also active on the European and the global stage. It is a founding member of the European Green Party and the Global Greens. Its MEPs sit in The Greens–European Free Alliance group. GroenLinks cooperates with seven other Dutch parties in the Netherlands Institute for Multiparty Democracy, an institute which supports democratic development in developing countries.

=== Relationships with other parties ===
GroenLinks was founded as a mid-sized party to the left of the Labour Party (PvdA). In the 1994 elections, the Socialist Party (SP) also entered parliament. GroenLinks now takes a central position in the Dutch left between the socialist SP, which is more to the left, and the social-democratic PvdA, which is more to the centre. This position is exemplified by the call of Femke Halsema to form a left-wing coalition after the 2006 elections, knowing that such a coalition is only possible with GroenLinks. The electoral alliance between SP and GL in the 1998, 2002 and 2006 elections, and between GroenLinks and PvdA in the 2004 European elections are examples of this position. In the 2007 First Chamber election, it had an electoral alliance with the Party for the Animals. More and more, however, GroenLinks is seen as the most culturally progressive of the three parties. Since 2023 GroenLinks has significantly intensified cooperation with PvdA, generally entering elections with a shared electoral list, including in European Parliament elections after which elected politicians joined separate groups. Both parties are internally discussing a possible complete merger.

GroenLinks does not run an independent list for the water board elections. Instead, like D66 and Volt Netherlands, it recommends that its voters support Water Natuurlijk, an independent, green-oriented political party focused solely on water board elections.

== See also ==
- Green party
- Green politics
- List of environmental organizations
