= 1984 European Parliament election in the Netherlands =

- 14 June 1984

25 seats to the European Parliament
- Turnout: 50.88%
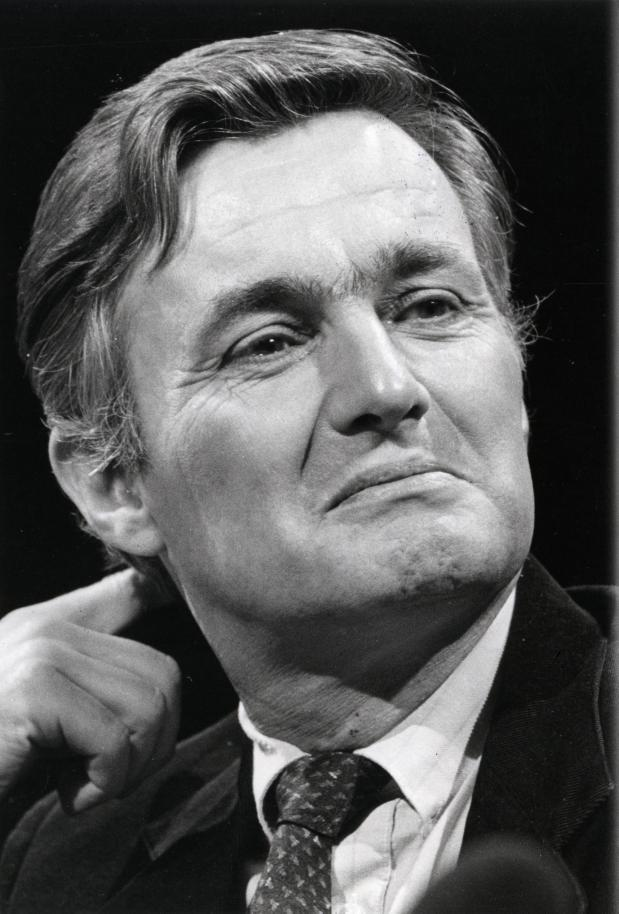

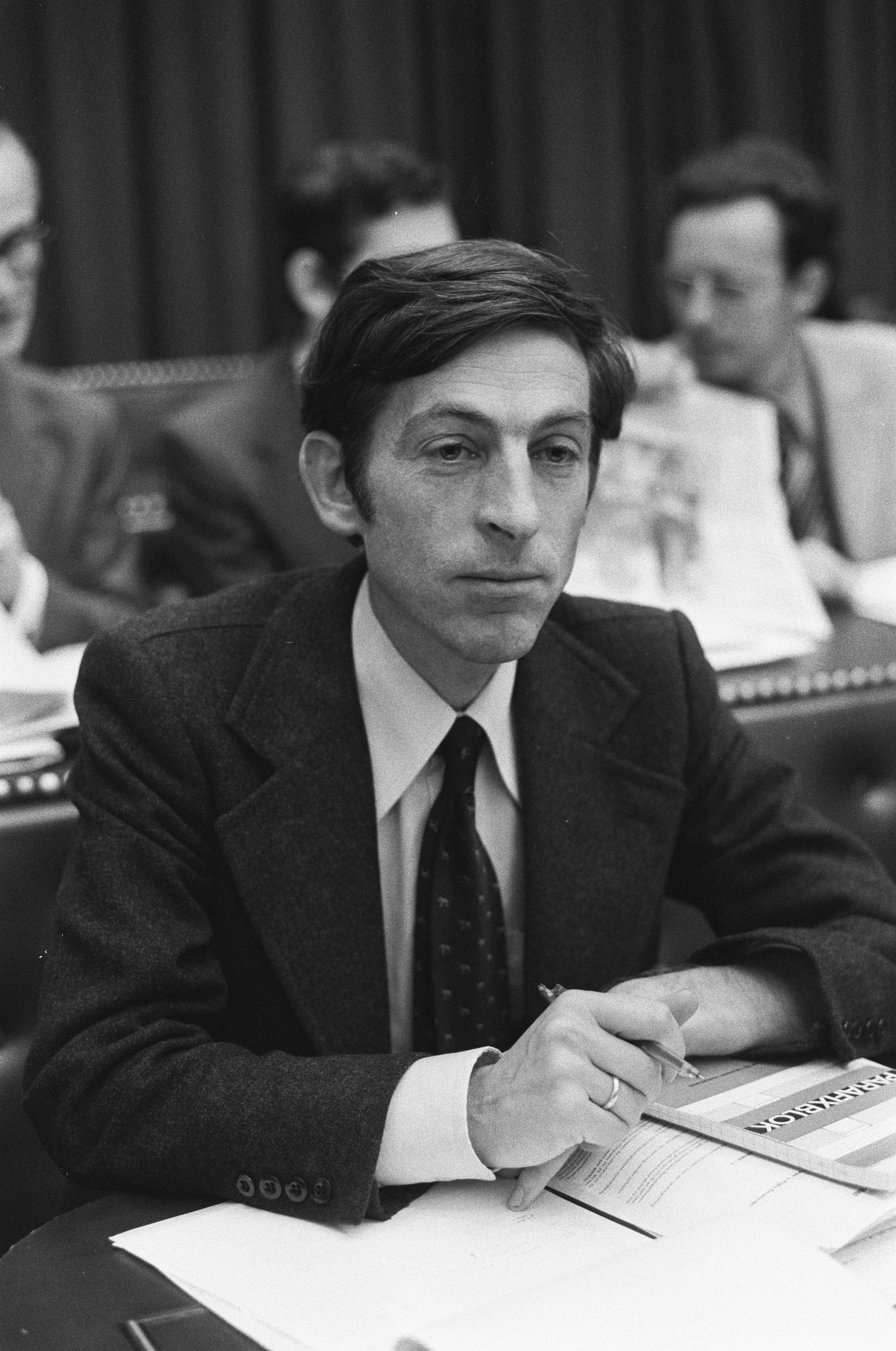

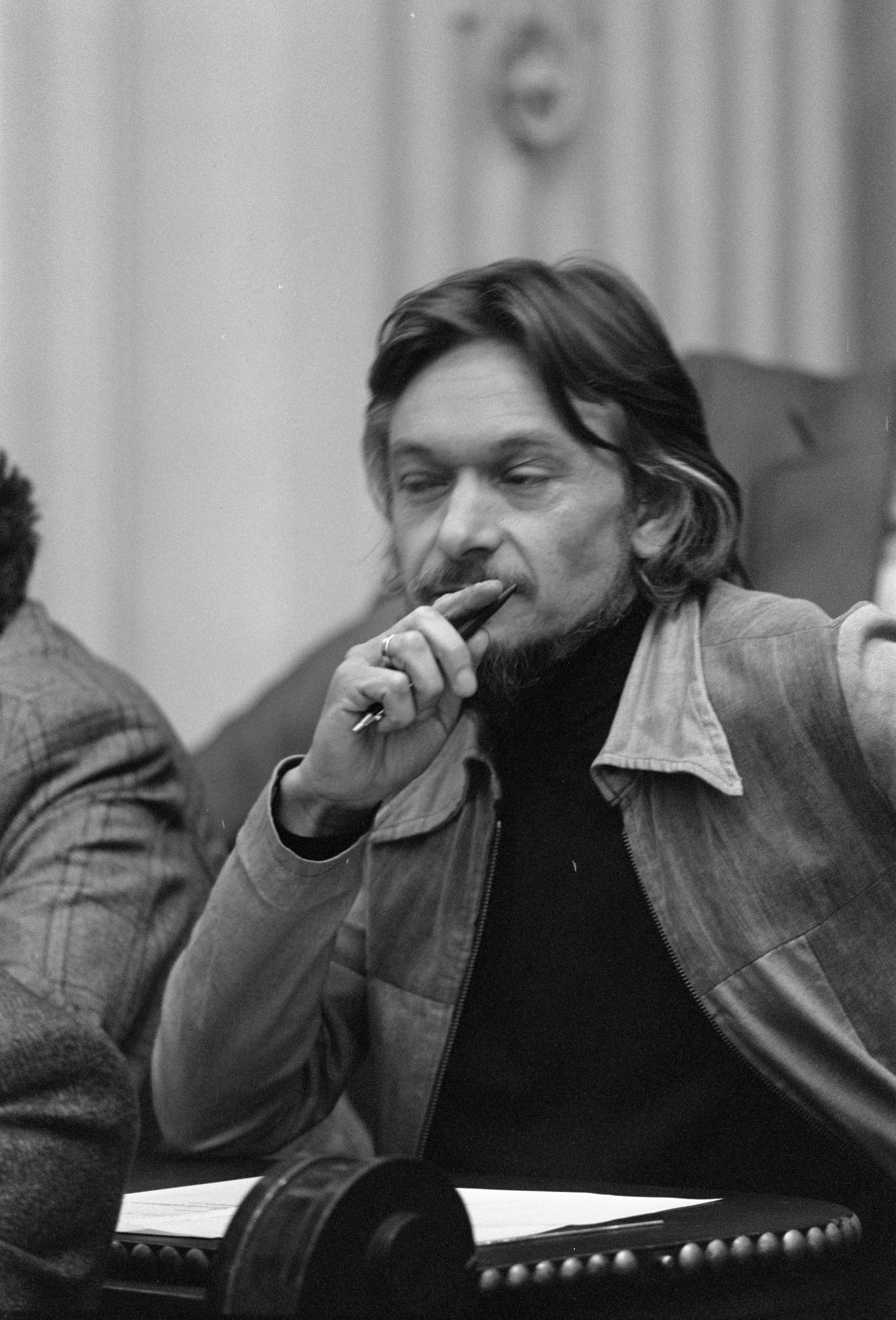

	First party	Second party	Third party
Leader	Piet Dankert	Bouke Beumer	Hans Nord
Party	PvdA	CDA	VVD
Alliance	SOC	EPP	LD
Seats won	9 / 25	8 / 25	5 / 25
Seat change	0	2 ▼	1 ▲
Popular vote	1,785,165	1,590,218	1,002,685
Percentage	33.70%	30.02%	18.93%
Swing	3.31% ▲	5.58% ▼	2.79% ▲
	Fourth party	Fifth party
Leader	Bram van der Lek	Leen van der Waal
Party	GPA	SGP/RPF/GPV
Alliance	RBW	NI
Seats won	2 / 25	1 / 25
Seat change	2 ▲	1 ▲
Popular vote	296,488	275,786
Percentage	5.60%	5.21%
Swing	0.54% ▲	1.88% ▲
- Most voted-for party by municipality

An election for Members of the European Parliament representing Netherlands constituency for the 1984–1989 term of the European Parliament was held on 14 June 1984. It was part of the wider 1984 European election. Nine parties competed in a D'Hondt type election for 25 seats.

== Background ==
=== Combined lists ===
Several parties combined in one list to take part in this European Election and increase their chance on a seat in the European Parliament. These combined lists are:

1. Green Progressive Accord of CPN, PSP, PPR and Green Party of the Netherlands
2. SGP, RPF and GPV

=== Electoral alliances ===
Two lists formed an electoral alliance:

1. PvdA/European Social-Democrats and Green Progressive Accord

=== Voting right ===
These people got right to vote in this second election for the European Parliament in 1984 in the Netherlands:

- Everyone who was allowed to vote in the Dutch parliament elections;
- Dutch who are resident in other Member States and did not already have voting rights for the Dutch Parliament elections;
- Subjects of one of the other Member States which have residence in the Netherlands. Provided that the state of which they are from granted the same.

=== Numbering of the candidates list ===
The official order and names of candidate lists:

Candidate lists for the 1984 European Parliament election in the Netherlands
List		English translation	List name (Dutch)
1	list	CDA European People's Party	CDA Europese Volkspartij
2	list	Labour Party/European Socialists	Partij van de Arbeid/Europese Socialisten
3	list	VVD - European Liberal-Democrats	VVD - Europese Liberaal-Democraten
4	list	D'66	
5	list	SGP, RPF and GPV	SGP, RPF en GPV
6	list	C.P.N. Green Party Netherlands P.P.R. P.S.P.	C.P.N. Groene Partij Nederland P.P.R. P.S.P.
7	list	European Greens	Europese Groenen
8	list	Centre Party	Centrumpartij
9	list	God with Us	God met Ons

== Results ==
In these elections both the leftwing CPN, PSP, PPR and Green Party of the Netherlands parties and the orthodox Protestant SGP, GPV, RPF parties have formed a successful common lists, which win two respectively one seat. the progressive liberal D'66 loses its two seats and disappears from the parliament. 50.88% of the Dutch population turned out on election day.

Party	Votes	%	Seats	+/–
Labour Party	1,785,165	33.70	9	0
Christian Democratic Appeal	1,590,218	30.02	8	–2
People's Party for Freedom and Democracy	1,002,685	18.93	5	+1
Green Progressive Accord	296,488	5.60	2	+2
SGP–GPV–RPF	275,786	5.21	1	+1
Centre Party	134,877	2.55	0	New
Democrats 66	120,826	2.28	0	–2
European Greens	67,413	1.27	0	New
God with Us	23,291	0.44	0	0
Total	5,296,749	100.00	25	0
Valid votes	5,296,749	99.29		
Invalid/blank votes	37,833	0.71		
Total votes	5,334,582	100.00		
Registered voters/turnout	10,485,014	50.88		
Source: Kiesraad

=== European groups ===
Summary of the 14 June 1984 European Parliament elections in the Netherlands
1984
European group		Seats 1979	Seats 1984	Change
Confederation of Socialist Parties	SOC	9	9	0
European People's Party	EPP	10	8	2 ▼
European Liberal Democrats	LD	4	5	1 ▲
Rainbow Group	RBW	0	2	2 ▲
Non-Inscrits	NI	2	1	1 ▼
		25	25	0
