= Populism =

Political ideology emphasising the "common people"

Populism is a contested concept for a variety of political stances that emphasise the idea of the "common people", often in opposition to a perceived elite. It is frequently associated with anti-establishment and anti-political sentiment.

The term developed in the late 19th century and has been applied to various politicians, parties, and movements since that time, often assuming a pejorative tone. Within political science and other social sciences, different definitions of populism have been employed.

== Etymology and terminology ==
The term "populism" has long been subject to mistranslation. Further, the term has also been used to describe a broad (and often contradictory) array of movements and beliefs. Its usage has spanned continents and contexts, leading many scholars to characterize it as a vague or overstretched concept, widely invoked in political discourse, yet inconsistently defined and poorly understood. Against this backdrop, numerous studies have examined the term's usage and diffusion across media, politics, and academic scholarship, highlighting the reciprocal influence among these spheres and tracing the semantic shifts that have shaped the evolving meaning of the concept.

=== Origins and early political uses ===
The word "populist" first appeared in English in 1858, where it was used as an antonym for "aristocratic" in a translation of a work by Alphonse de Lamartine. In the Russian Empire of the 1860s and 1870s, the term was associated with the narodniki, a left-leaning agrarian movement whose name is often translated as "populists". Russian populism in the late 19th century aimed to transfer political power to the peasant communes through a radical program of agrarian reform, and has been described by some historians as an important intellectual and organisational precursor to influencing later revolutionary movements in Russia. In English, however, the term gained broader prominence through its use by the U.S.-based People's Party and its predecessors, active between the 1880s and early 1900s. The People's Party championed small-scale farmers, advocating for expansionist monetary policies and accessible credit, and was relatively progressive – for its time – on issues concerning women's and minority rights. Although both the Russian and American movements have been labeled "populist", they differed in their ideological content and historical trajectory.

In the early 20th century, particularly in France, the term shifted into the realm of literature, where it came to designate a genre of novel that sympathetically portrayed the lives of the lower classes. Léon Lemonnier published a manifesto for the genre in 1929, and Antonine Coullet-Tessier established a prize for it in 1931.

The term entered the Latin American political lexicon in the post-war period, becoming a defining feature of the region's political landscape. It was initially associated in the media with charismatic leaders capable of mobilizing recently urbanized populations, particularly those displaced by rural migration. These new urban groups, increasingly integrated into electoral politics, were seen as escaping older systems of clientelist control such as "halter voting" (voto de cabresto or voto cantado) and began to redefine national political life. Although often viewed with suspicion and associated with manipulation or demagoguery, populism in this context frequently carried a positive connotation and was openly embraced by political actors.

=== Academic adoption and conceptual drift ===
Until the 1950s, use of the term "populism" in academia remained restricted largely to historians studying the People's Party. In 1954, however, two pivotal publications marked a turning point in the conceptual development of the term. In the United States, analyzing the rise of McCarthyism, sociologist Edward Shils published an article proposing populism as a term to describe anti-elite trends in US society more broadly. Simultaneously in Brazil, political scientist Hélio Jaguaribe, responding to the country's emerging "populist hype" in the press, published what is considered the first academic text on Latin American populism, framing it as a form of class conciliation.

Following Shils' intervention, the 1960s saw populism gain increasing traction among US sociologists and other academics in the social sciences. Notably, historian Richard Hofstadter and sociologist Daniel Bell reinterpreted the legacy of the People's Party through a critical lens, portraying it as an expression of status anxiety and irrationalism. A parallel trend unfolded in Latin America, where scholars—often influenced by Marxist frameworks—began to investigate populism as a political phenomenon tied to modernization, mass mobilization, and developmentalist ideologies. Despite the growing interest, scholarly consensus on the definition of populism remained elusive. Notably, a 1967 conference at the London School of Economics that brought together many of the era's leading experts failed to produce a unified theoretical framework.

The convergence of new—and often contested—academic interpretations with the use of the term by political forces critical of those labeled as populists has contributed to its increasingly negative connotation. The absence of a coherent ideological platform or consistent programmatic formulation among self-proclaimed populists, combined with the lack of a coordinated international movement, has further enabled the term to vary widely in meaning. As a result, populism has come to be applied across a broad range of political contexts and figures, often without clear or consistent definition. The term has often been conflated with other concepts like demagoguery, and generally presented as something to be feared and discredited. It has often been applied as a catchword to movements that are considered to be outside the political mainstream or a threat to democracy.

=== Populist hype and scholarly debate ===
Although scholars had already observed that populism was becoming a recurring feature of Western democracies by the early 1990s, the term gained unprecedented global prominence following the political upheavals of 2016—most notably, the election of Donald Trump as President of the United States and the United Kingdom's vote to leave the European Union. Both events were widely interpreted as expressions of populist sentiment, sparking renewed public interest in the concept. Reflecting this heightened attention, the Cambridge Dictionary selected "populism" as its Word of the Year in 2017.

This so-called "populist hype" also found its counterpart in academia. Whereas between 1950 and 1960 roughly 160 publications on populism were recorded, that number rose to over 1,500 between 1990 and 2000. From 2000 to 2015, an average of 95 academic papers and books annually included the term "populism" in their title or abstract as catalogued by Web of Science. In 2016, that number climbed to 266; in 2017, it reached 488; and by 2018, it had grown to 615.

The conceptual ambiguity surrounding the term—exacerbated by this spike in political and academic attention—has led some scholars to propose abandoning "populism" as an analytical category altogether. In particular, the frequent conflation of populism with far-right nativism has drawn criticism for misrepresenting the ethos of historical self-described populists, while also providing a euphemistic gloss for racist or authoritarian political actors seeking legitimacy by claiming to represent "the people."

In contrast, others argue that the concept remains too integral to political analysis to be discarded. If clearly defined, they contend, "populism" could be a valuable tool for understanding a broad range of political actors, especially those operating on the margins of mainstream politics.

== Theories ==
Owing to the polysemy of the term ‘populism’, it has been variously interpreted across theoretical frameworks and associated with multiple, sometimes incompatible, definitions. Scholars differ sharply in their assessments of populism: while some define it as inherently anti-democratic, stressing its threats to liberal institutions and the rule of law, others view it as an inherently democratic impulse aimed at empowering marginalized groups and restoring popular sovereignty. Still others argue that populism can assume multiple and even contradictory facets depending on the context. Today, the main theoretical approaches to populism are the ideational, class-based, discursive, performative, strategic, and economic frameworks.

=== Ideational approaches ===
The ideational approach defines populism as a "thin-centred ideology" that divides society into two antagonistic groups: "the pure people" and "the corrupt elite", and sees politics as an expression of the general will (volonté générale) of the people. It positions populism not as a comprehensive ideology but one that attaches itself to broader political movements, like socialism or conservatism. Scholars like Cas Mudde and Cristóbal Rovira Kaltwasser emphasize that populism is moralistic rather than programmatic, promoting a binary worldview that resists compromise. This ideology is present across diverse political systems, is not limited to charismatic leadership, and can be employed flexibly to support a range of agendas on both the left and the right.

According to ideational scholars, populism constructs "the people" as a virtuous and unified group, often with vague or shifting boundaries, allowing populist leaders to define inclusion or exclusion based on strategic goals. This group is seen as sovereign and historically grounded, whose common sense is viewed as superior to elite expertise or institutional knowledge. Conversely, "the elite" is portrayed as a homogeneous, corrupt force undermining the people's will. Depending on context, elites may be defined economically, politically, culturally, or even ethnically. The concept of the general will is presented in the ideational approach as central to populist rhetoric, aligning with a critique of representative democracy in favor of direct forms of decision-making such as referendums. This approach resonates with Rousseau's philosophical legacy, suggesting that only "the people" know what is best for society.

Ideational scholars emphasize the ambivalent relationship between populism and democracy. While they note that not all populists are authoritarian and recognize that populism can help redeem liberal democracy from its shortcomings when operating in opposition—by mobilizing social groups who feel excluded from political decision-making processes and by raising awareness among socio-political elites of popular grievances—they generally contend that populism becomes inherently detrimental to pluralism once in power. By often claiming to represent the authentic will of the people, populists—particularly those aligned with right-wing movements—may facilitate executive power concentration and bypass or actively undermine liberal democratic institutions designed to safeguard minority rights, most notably the judiciary and the media, often portrayed as disconnected from the populace. This dynamic can be especially potent in contexts where the rule of law has weak institutional foundations, creating fertile ground for democratic backsliding. In such cases, populist governance may give rise to what philosopher John Stuart Mill termed the "tyranny of the majority."

The ideational definition is not without criticism. Some argue that it proceeds deductively, establishing a definition in advance and then applying it to cases in a way that imposes rigid assumptions—such as moral dualism and the homogeneity of "the people"—that may not hold empirically in all contexts. Others caution that if broadly applied, the term risks becoming too vague, potentially encompassing most political discourse.

=== Class-based approaches ===
Class-based approaches interpret populism as a phenomenon rooted in social class dynamics. Latin American scholars such as Hélio Jaguaribe and Gino Germani were among the first to interpret populism as a mass-based phenomenon of political mobilization, characteristic of societies undergoing rapid modernization. They emphasized features such as personalist leadership, the political incorporation of previously excluded social sectors, and institutional fragility—often accompanied by authoritarian tendencies. In Germani's case, his theory of national-popular movements and the "authoritarianism of the popular classes" was developed in dialogue with American sociologist Seymour Martin Lipset. Drawing in part on analyses of McCarthyism, Lipset argued that populism is a movement that unites various social classes, typically around a charismatic leader. While noting that this characteristic also appears in fascism, Lipset emphasized a key distinction: fascism draws primarily from the middle classes, whereas populism finds its main social base among the poor.

A more explicitly class-oriented interpretation comes from the Marxist tradition, particularly influential in Latin America through thinkers such as Francisco Weffort, Fernando Henrique Cardoso and Octavio Ianni. Breaking with the sympathetic stance toward Russian populism found in the late writings of Karl Marx, these Latin American Marxists drew instead on Marx's reflections on Bonapartism and Antonio Gramsci's concept of Caesarism. From this perspective, populism arises in moments of equilibrium between antagonistic classes—when the bourgeoisie has lost its hegemonic capacity but the proletariat has not yet seized power. In such conditions, political power gains autonomy from dominant classes and positions itself as an arbiter, drawing support from what Marx termed the "mass": a disorganized group lacking class consciousness and vulnerable to charismatic leadership.

Marxist critics in Latin America acknowledged populism's role in integrating the popular masses into political life and fostering social and economic development. However, they argued that this integration was limited—proto-democratic in form but ultimately constrained within a bourgeois framework. Populist regimes, they contended, often demobilized collective organization by substituting social benefits and labor reforms for class struggle, while subordinating trade unions to state control and electoral interests. These critiques have been challenged by historians who argue that the so-called populist period in Latin American history was in fact marked by a growing politicization of workers—one that may have posed a challenge to established political and economic interests.

=== Discursive approaches ===
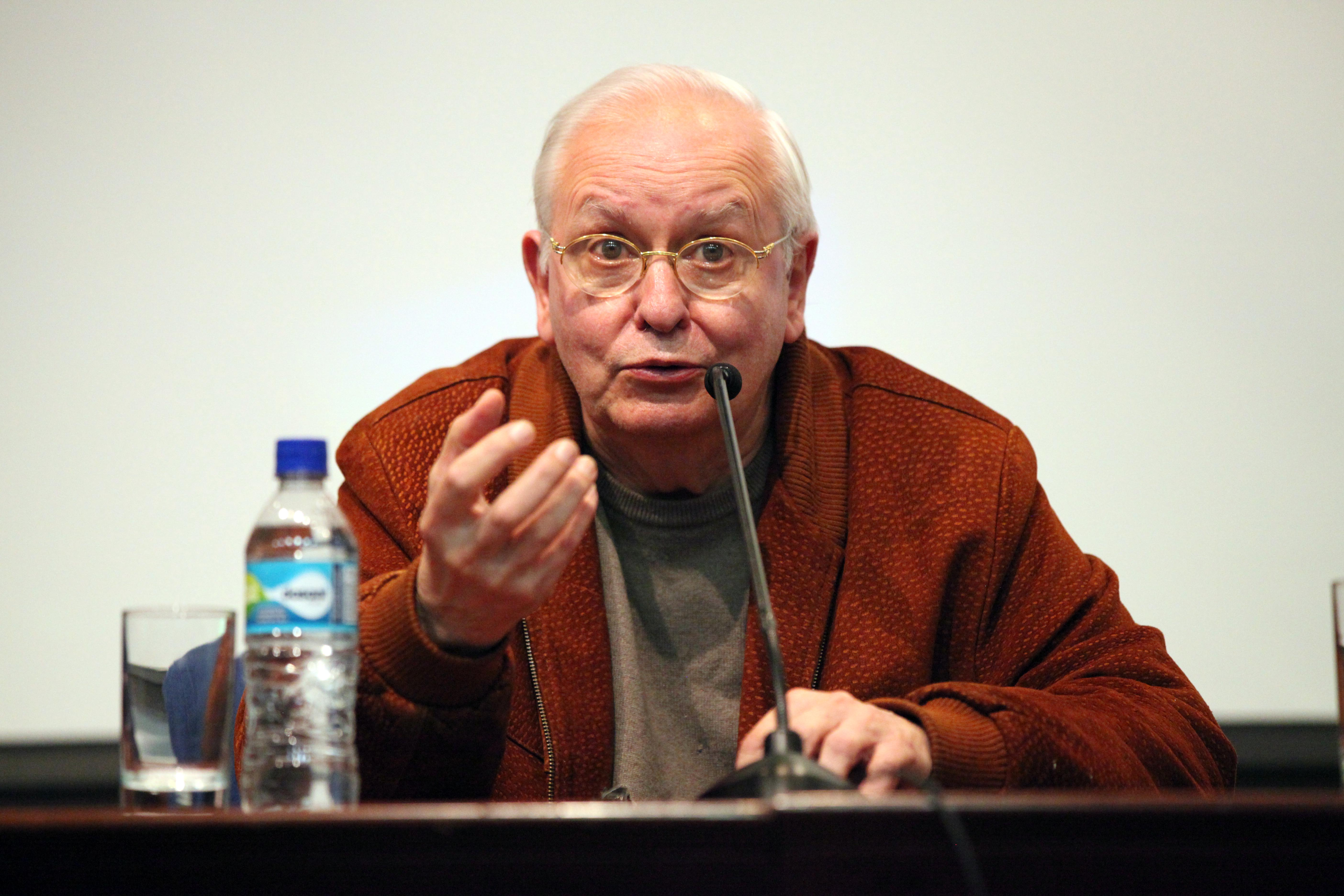
The Argentine political theorist Ernesto Laclau developed a distinctive definition of populism, viewing it as a potentially positive force for emancipatory social change.

The discursive approach is most closely associated with Argentine political theorist Ernesto Laclau and other scholars of the so-called Essex School. For Laclau, populism should be understood as a discursive logic in which a series of unmet demands coalesce around a symbol that names a popular movement in opposition to an elite. Although charismatic leaders are often the most common symbols of populist movements, the discursive approach maintains that populism can exist without this type of leadership.

Unlike the ideational approach, the discursive tradition does not necessarily view the opposition of the "bottom" against the "top" as moralistic. In contrast to the Marxist approach, it also criticizes what it sees as the idealization of an autonomous social class, as opposed to a manipulated mass. From a constructivist perspective, Laclau and his followers argue that political subjects—and particularly an entity such as "the people"—are always radically contingent discursive constructions, capable of taking on various forms.

Normatively, Laclau's definition of populism refrains from judging whether populism is inherently positive or negative. However, it sets itself apart from previous approaches by regarding some populist experiences in power as genuinely democratizing. Building on this perspective, some scholars influenced by Laclau argue that populism is inherently emancipatory and pluralistic, and that authoritarian and nationalist movements often labeled as populist would be more accurately described as fascist.

=== Performative/socio-cultural approaches ===
The performative approach—also known as the socio-cultural approach and occasionally referred to as the stylistic approach—is often presented as a branch of the discursive approach. Its main exponents include Pierre Ostiguy, Benjamin Moffitt, and María Esperanza Casullo. This approach views populism not as a fixed ideology but as a political style—a repertoire of symbolically mediated performances through which leaders construct and navigate power. Rather than focusing on what populists believe, this perspective highlights how they communicate and present themselves, encompassing rhetoric, gestures, body language, fashion, imagery, and staging. These aesthetic and performative elements are essential to how populism operates in practice.

Critiquing what it sees as excessive formalism in Laclau's theory, the performative approach emphasizes the theatrical and transgressive nature of populism. Populist actors often break with traditional norms and expectations of political behavior, embracing styles that are irreverent, culturally popular, and emotionally charged. Populism is thus seen as a performance that challenges the boundaries of "respectable" political discourse.

While some scholars focus on the performances of charismatic leaders, others emphasize the historical and social dimension of populist transgression, noting its capacity to mobilize marginalized sectors traditionally excluded from political life. The sudden entry of these groups into the public sphere is often experienced as disruptive or shocking.

As with the discursive approach, advocates of the performative theory maintain that populism can, in some cases, express emancipatory potential.

=== Strategic approaches ===
An additional framework has been described as the "political-strategic" approach. This applies the term populism to a political strategy in which a charismatic leader seeks to govern based on direct and unmediated connection with their followers. Kurt Weyland defined this conception of populism as a political strategy employed by a personalist leader who governs through direct, unmediated, uninstitutionalized support from large numbers of mostly unorganized followers. According to this perspective, a populist strategy for winning and exerting state power stands in tension with democracy and the values of pluralism, open debate, and fair competition.

A common criticism of the strategic approach is that, by focusing on leadership, this concept of populism does not allow for the existence of populist parties or populist social movements. As a result, it overlooks historical cases often considered paradigmatic of populism, such as the US People's Party. Furthermore, this approach may inadvertently reinforce popular perceptions of populism as a style of politics characterized by overly simplistic solutions to complex problems, delivered in an emotionally charged manner or through the promotion of short-term, unrealistic, and unsustainable policies. While this usage may seem intuitively meaningful, some argue that it is difficult to apply empirically, since most political actors engage in slogans and rhetoric, and distinguishing between emotionally charged and rational arguments can be problematic. This phenomenon is more accurately described as demagogy or opportunism.

=== Economic approaches ===
Closely related to the ideas of demagogy and opportunism, the socioeconomic definition of populism refers to a pattern of irresponsible economic policymaking, in which governments implement expansive public spending—typically financed by foreign loans—followed by inflationary crises and subsequent austerity measures. This understanding gained prominence in the 1980s and 1990s through economists such as Rudiger Dornbusch, Jeffrey Sachs, and Sebastián Edwards, particularly in studies of Latin American economies. It builds on earlier critiques by Argentine economist Marcelo Diamand, who argued that economies like Argentina experienced cyclical swings between unsustainable populist spending and excessive austerity. Although Diamand critiqued both extremes, later U.S.-based economists largely abandoned his condemnation of austerity, instead framing it as a necessary corrective for economic instability.

While still invoked by some economists and journalists—particularly in Latin America—this economic definition of populism remains relatively uncommon in the broader social sciences. Critics argue that it reduces populism to left-wing economic mismanagement, overlooks the term's political and ideological dimensions, and fails to account for populist leaders who implemented neoliberal policies. The term "populism" is often used in this context to stigmatize heterodox economic policies, thereby narrowing space for debate.

== Possible causes ==
Over the decades, and across various theoretical approaches, populism has been associated with massification and the dissolution of social bonds. Explanations for this process vary, pointing to economic, labor, and cultural transformations, along with their subjective consequences.

=== Economic grievance ===
The economic grievance thesis argues that economic factors have contributed to the formation of a 'left-behind' precariat marked by low job security, high inequality, and wage stagnation. On this account, the group would be more inclined to support populism. Reasons for precarity vary: in the Global North, it has often been linked to a decline in living standards due to deindustrialization, economic liberalization, and deregulation, whereas in the Global South, it tends to follow a truncated process of upward mobility, in which workers emerge from extreme poverty but remain in unstable, low-quality employment and living conditions. To account for these dynamics, some theories focus specifically on the effects of economic crises, or inequality, while others emphasize globalization's role in disrupting established labor markets and fueling economic dislocation.

Macro-level evidence suggests that resentment toward outgroups tends to rise during periods of economic hardship, and economic crises have been associated with gains for far-right parties—entities frequently conflated with populist movements, though not necessarily synonymous. However, micro-level studies have found only limited evidence linking individual economic grievances directly to support for populist candidates or parties.

=== Modernization ===
The modernization losers theory argues that certain aspects of transition to modernity have caused demand for populism. This argument was advanced in the 1950s by Hofstadter and other early revisionist scholars who examined the People's Party, interpreting their populism as a response to deep-seated cultural anxieties in the face of modern economic and social transformations. This anxiety manifested in a partial rejection of modernity—not against technology or progress itself, but against the perceived social and moral effects of modern capitalism and urbanization. More recently, scholars have pointed to the anomie that followed industrialization, resulting in dissolution, fragmentation, and differentiation, which weakened the traditional ties of civil society and increased individualization. Some analysts argue that such conditions—marked by fragmented identities and weak collective structures—now resemble the dynamics long observed in the Global South, where class fluidity, economic insecurity, and limited institutional integration have historically shaped populist politics. Populism appeals to déclassé elements across all social strata, offering a broad identity which gives sovereignty to the previously marginalized masses as "the people".

=== Cultural backlash ===
Another theory that connects the emergence of populism to transformations associated with modernity—though from a different angle—is the cultural backlash thesis. Focusing specifically on the rise of far-right populism, Pippa Norris and Ronald Inglehart argue that such movements are a reaction to the growing prominence of postmaterialism in many developed countries, including the spread of feminism, multiculturalism, and environmentalism. According to this view, the diffusion of new ideas and values gradually challenges established norms, eventually reaching a "tipping point" that provokes a backlash from segments of the population who previously held dominant social positions—particularly older, white, less-educated men—expressed through support for right-wing populism. Some theories limit this argument to being a reaction to just the increase of ethnic diversity from immigration. Such theories are particularly popular with sociologists and with political scientists studying industrial world and American politics.

Empirical studies testing the cultural backlash thesis have produced mixed results. While individual-level research shows strong links between sociocultural attitudes—such as views on immigration or racial resentment—and support for right-wing populist parties, macro-level analyses have not consistently found correlations between aggregate populist sentiment and electoral outcomes. Nonetheless, political science and psychology research point to the significant role of group-based identity threats: individuals who feel their social group is under threat are more likely to back political actors who promise to protect its status and identity. Although much of this work has focused on white identity politics, similar patterns are observed among other groups that perceive themselves as marginalized.

=== Post-democracy ===
Various authors have presented populism as a response, reaction, or symptom of post-democracy. Post-democracy refers to a condition in which the formal institutions of liberal democracy—elections, parties, and representative government—continue to exist, but their functioning is increasingly dominated by elites, technocratic decision-making, and market forces.

Populism is therefore often understood as a reaction to the narrowing of political choice, the decline of responsive, representative governance, and the resulting gaps in political representation. Scholars offer various explanations for this development. One perspective holds that these dynamics are especially pronounced in societies where civil society is weak or in decline—a condition that some scholars view as historically characteristic of the Global South, where populism has been more recurrent, but which is increasingly visible in the Global North as well. Others emphasize the role of globalization, which is seen as having seriously limited the powers of national elites and constrained their capacity to respond to popular demands. Another commonly cited factor is the convergence of mainstream parties, particularly those on the center-left and center-right, which often avoid addressing contentious or pressing public concerns. In terms of the median voter theorem, such clustering around the median can leave voters at the margins of the political spectrum feeling unrepresented, thereby opening space for populist challengers.

Authors have pointed out that the design of political systems can also influence the perception of distance between representatives and represented, and shape the conditions under which populism emerges. Low levels of political efficacy and high proportions of wasted votes are associated with increased support for populist alternatives. In the United States, mechanisms such as gerrymandering, lobbying, and opaque campaign financing contribute to the perception that government is unresponsive to the majority. In the European Union, the transfer of policy authority to technocratic and supranational bodies—such as the European Central Bank—can distance decision-making from voters, further intensifying democratic disaffection. Likewise, widespread corruption scandals can deepen the sense that political elites are self-serving and out of touch with ordinary citizens, which can increase support for populist movements.

=== Media transformation ===
Several scholars have linked the rise of populism to transformations in media and communication dynamics. Since the late 1960s, the spread of television has contributed to the personalization of politics, favoring charismatic leadership over party-centered politics—an approach frequently associated with populism. Populist leaders have often made strategic use of mass media to cultivate a sense of direct connection with their audiences, relying on unfiltered communication to strengthen their legitimacy. In various regions, broadcast formats have historically been used to bypass intermediaries and appeal to constituencies traditionally marginalized by elite discourse.

Some scholars argue that media ownership and market dynamics have further accentuated these trends. As private media companies competed for audiences, they increasingly prioritized sensationalism and political scandal, fostering anti-establishment sentiment and public cynicism toward government institutions. Media outlets, driven by commercial imperatives, have also been said to contribute to the dissemination of populist rhetoric by providing disproportionate coverage to controversial figures, thereby amplifying their visibility and normalizing transgressive discourse. This dynamic has been observed across a range of media systems, including tabloids and even elements of the quality press.

In the digital era, scholars have argued that social media platforms have further reshaped political communication in ways that favor populist discourse. These platforms have been described as having "elective affinities" with populism, as they bypass traditional gatekeeping mechanisms and foster the impression that political authority and legitimacy now rest directly with the people. Furthermore, political communication on these platforms tends to rely on fragmentation and conflict-driven narratives, which may amplify populist messages.

== Mobilization ==
Several authors have examined populism as a form of political mobilization that incorporates previously invisible or marginalized sectors into the political arena. However, the specific forms that this mobilization takes remain a subject of debate in the literature. While some scholars argue that populism is inherently tied to the figure of a charismatic leader, others contend that it can manifest in three distinct but sometimes coexisting forms: the populist leader, the populist political party, and the populist social movement.

=== Leaders ===
Populism is frequently associated with charismatic leadership. In an era of increasingly personalized politics, the success and longevity of populist movements often depend on leaders’ personal charisma and individual appeal. Such leaders claim to represent "the people" and, in many cases, portray themselves as the embodiment of the people—as the vox populi, or "voice of the people."

Drawing on Margaret Canovan's insight that populists often employ undiplomatic rhetoric and a tabloid style that contrasts with institutional norms, scholars from sociocultural and performative approaches have emphasized the theatrical and stylistic dimensions of populist leadership. While genuine political outsiders are relatively rare, populist leaders often perform a form of outsiderness to construct authenticity and distinguish themselves from "suited elites" and professional politicians. The literature highlights the transgressive nature of this performance, noting that it can take multiple, overlapping forms: interactional, rhetorical, and theatrical.

Interactional transgressions refer to the ways populist leaders violate conventional norms of interpersonal conduct—employing personal insults, invading personal space, using provocative gestures, or making suggestive innuendos—to create a confrontational political presence. Scholars from the ideational approach link such behavior to populism's underlying moral framework, which constructs politics as a struggle between a virtuous people and corrupt elites, framing critics and opponents as "enemies of the people."

Rhetorical transgressions include a rejection of the polished, technocratic language typical of establishment politicians. Populist speech often favors simplicity, directness, or even vulgarity—aligning with the populist emphasis on authenticity. Populist figures may adopt the persona of the "uomo qualunque" (common man), using informal or crude speech. Ethnic identity can likewise be mobilized: leaders such as Evo Morales and Alberto Fujimori used their non-white heritage to position themselves in contrast to historically white-dominated elites. Others have drawn on indigenous or vernacular languages in public speech, symbolically rejecting elite or colonial norms. Gendered performances also shape populist transgressive rhetoric. Male populists may emphasize virility or dominance—Umberto Bossi’s obscene gestures or Silvio Berlusconi’s sexual boasts are emblematic—while female populists often present themselves as protective maternal figures, such as Sarah Palin’s "mama grizzly" persona or Pauline Hanson’s claim to care for Australia "like a mother." Performative scholars such as Casullo have argued that this transgressive style not only affirms ordinariness but also incorporates performances of extraordinariness. For instance, Cristina Fernández de Kirchner and Eva Perón used glamorous fashion not to signal simplicity but to project aspirational ideals and popular empowerment.

Theatrical transgressions involve a refusal to conceal the performative nature of political life. While mainstream politicians typically mask the staged aspects of their public appearances, populist leaders often foreground them. Donald Trump, for example, frequently made metapolitical asides during U.S. presidential debates, mocking rhetorical conventions and drawing attention to their formulaic nature.

=== Political parties ===
Though some populist parties champion citizen-led direct democracy through popular initiatives, populism does not reject party-based parliamentary representation entirely. Rather, it seeks to redefine it by privileging figures who claim to speak authentically for "the people." Populist political parties often emerge around a charismatic leader, adopting top-down structures that concentrate decision-making and symbolic authority in a single figure. These parties function as vehicles for personal leadership, reinforcing the central role of the leader in mobilizing support and framing political identity. Leadership transitions can be pivotal: some parties, like Argentina's Justicialist Party and Venezuela's United Socialist Party (PSUV), maintained cohesion after the deaths of their founding figures, while others fractured.

Sometimes, rather than founding new parties, populists overtake existing ones, as seen with the Freedom Party of Austria (FPÖ) and the Swiss People's Party (SVP). In other cases, established parties undergo a gradual populist transformation. A notable example is the Greek party SYRIZA, which between 2012 and 2015 evolved from a radical left-wing party primarily appealing to "the left" and then "the youth," to one that claimed to represent "the people." This transformation was marked not only by changes in speeches but also by increasingly transgressive performances by its leaders, who, once in power, broke with conventional political decorum. Such transformations may reflect a broader pattern of diffusion within party systems. A cross-national study drawing on expert-coded party data found that parties become more likely to adopt populist rhetoric in subsequent electoral cycles when it is more prevalent among their competitors, with anti-elitist and people-centered appeals spreading most strongly and right-leaning parties showing the greatest responsiveness. Populist electoral success also appears to reshape the structure of party systems themselves. A cross-national panel study of electoral democracies between 1970 and 2020 found that stronger populist performance was followed by more concentrated party systems with fewer effective parties, an effect attributed to the delegitimation of moderate positions, polarisation crowding out centrist parties, and entry barriers facing new challenger.

As the case of SYRIZA illustrates, the boundaries between political parties and social movements can be fluid. While SYRIZA eventually became a major institutional actor, its early trajectory was deeply intertwined with grassroots mobilizations against austerity. Other populist parties have emerged even more directly from mass movements seeking to channel grassroots discontent into formal politics. The Spanish party Podemos, for example, was founded in the wake of the Indignados movement, while India's Aam Aadmi Party grew out of the India Against Corruption campaign. These examples illustrate how populist energy can flow between civil society and electoral arenas—a phenomenon further explored in the context of grassroots populist movements.

=== Social movements ===
The wave of mass protests that followed the 2008 financial crisis has often been characterized as a populist phenomenon. Although differing in context, tone, and social composition, these mobilizations shared a rejection of established political elites, emphasized the moral authority of "the people," and advanced demands for more inclusive and participatory forms of democracy. The Occupy movement in the United States, the Indignados movement in Spain, the anti-austerity protests in Greece, and the Gilets jaunes (Yellow Vests) in France all combined anti-elite rhetoric with horizontal experiments in democratic organization. Symbolic slogans such as "We are the 99%" captured the populist framing of these protests, portraying a voiceless majority in opposition to a privileged elite. Although they shared common traits, the social base and geographical focus of these mobilizations varied: while earlier protests were often concentrated in urban hubs, the Gilets jaunes mobilized primarily rural and peri-urban populations, voicing the grievances of what was sometimes called "la France oubliée" (forgotten France).

These grassroots mobilizations, whether or not they evolved into lasting political structures, exerted a profound influence on electoral politics and public discourse. They reshaped political agendas, introduced new rhetorical styles centered on anti-elitism and citizen empowerment, and forced established actors to respond to new forms of popular expression. In Spain and Greece, protest movements reconfigured political debates around austerity and democratic renewal. In the United States, the Occupy Wall Street movement influenced the language and priorities of Bernie Sanders’ 2016 presidential campaign, particularly its emphasis on economic inequality and corporate power. Conversely, right-wing populist energy found expression through the Tea Party movement, which contributed to shifting the Republican Party toward a more anti-establishment posture and paved the way for the rise of Donald Trump.

Scholars in the discursive tradition of populism studies have emphasized the complex and often reciprocal relationship between populist leaders and social movements—particularly in left-wing or socially oriented contexts. Rather than assuming a one-directional, top-down mobilization, this view highlights how leaders can contribute to the politicization and organization of civil society, and how movements, in turn, can shape and transform leadership. In Latin America, this dynamic has deep historical roots. Mid-twentieth-century leaders such as Juan Perón in Argentina and Getúlio Vargas in Brazil played a central role in organizing labor unions and incorporating subaltern sectors into national politics. While initially aligned with the regime, these sectors often gained autonomy and began articulating demands independently. More recently, Hugo Chávez in Venezuela promoted participatory structures such as Bolivarian Circles, Communal Councils, and Urban Land Committees. Designed to deepen popular engagement and distribute resources, these initiatives also created new networks of mobilization. A further example, noted by political theorists Paula Biglieri and Luciana Cadahia, is the role of grassroots feminist activists in Argentina, who successfully pressured the Peronist leadership to support the legalization of abortion—despite their initial opposition to the measure.

== Responses to populism ==
Debates around how to respond to populism reveal sharp divides between those who see it as a threat to be contained and those who view it as a symptom of deeper democratic failures. While many mainstream actors focus on defending liberal institutions from populist erosion, left-wing theorists have explored how populist energies might be redirected toward egalitarian or emancipatory ends.

=== Mainstream responses ===
Among liberal scholars, a central concern has been the preservation of institutional safeguards. Authors like Steven Levitsky and Daniel Ziblatt argue that populist figures with authoritarian leanings often become viable only when traditional elites choose to accommodate them for strategic reasons. In their account, democratic backsliding typically occurs when political elites fail to uphold informal norms of mutual toleration and institutional forbearance. Their approach aligns with aspects of elite theory, emphasizing the responsibility of established power-holders to act as gatekeepers to safeguard democratic norms.

Reflecting this logic, several European countries have adopted the strategy of a cordon sanitaire, in which mainstream parties refuse to cooperate or form coalitions with populist or extremist actors, seeking to prevent their institutional legitimation. The media, too, can play a crucial role in either reinforcing or undermining these gatekeeping efforts. In some contexts, media institutions have amplified populist narratives or provided favorable coverage, while in others they have attempted to marginalize such movements. Additionally, some scholars note that when mainstream actors adopt elements of the populist style—such as anti-elitist rhetoric—they may inadvertently contribute to the normalization of populism rather than containing it.

Related to this is the concept of militant democracy or defensive democracy, originally articulated by Karl Loewenstein in the 1930s. Loewenstein argued that liberal democracies must sometimes take exceptional restrictive measures that might seem arbitrary and limit certain freedoms to defend themselves against actors who exploit democratic procedures to undermine democratic substance—a concern that also resonates with Karl Popper’s paradox of tolerance. This approach has gained renewed attention in contexts such as Brazil, where the Supreme Court expanded its own procedural interpretations to investigate anti-democratic activities after the Prosecutor General's Office had been politically aligned with then-president Jair Bolsonaro. These actions were justified as necessary to uphold the rule of law in the face of institutional capture. A similar logic has been invoked in Romania, where legal and institutional efforts to constrain far-right movements have prompted public controversy over how far democracies can go in defending themselves without compromising pluralism and political freedom.

Mudde and Rovira Kaltwasser, while critical of populism, caution against the widespread liberal impulse to disqualify populists as "irrational," "immoral," or "foolish." In their view, such discursive strategies often play into the hands of populists, reinforcing the binary logic—"the pure people" versus "the corrupt elite"—on which they believe populism thrives. Rather than moralizing condemnation, they advocate for sustained engagement with populist supporters and arguments, alongside a principled defense of liberal democratic values.

=== Left populist responses ===
From the perspective of left populism, the rise of reactionary populist movements is often interpreted as a response to a broader anti-political sentiment—a rejection of technocratic consensus, elite detachment, and social abandonment. Thinkers such as Chantal Mouffe argue that this dissatisfaction should not be left in the hands of the right, but rather reappropriated through a left populist project that mobilizes passion for democratic and egalitarian ends.

However, there are strategic disagreements among left populists. Some scholars suggest that left movements must engage with national identity and reduce emphasis on minority-focused policies to reconnect with disaffected working-class constituencies. This perspective underlies proposals for a left populism that emphasizes cultural belonging and national sovereignty alongside economic redistribution, as seen in the positions of German politician Sahra Wagenknecht, who has criticized the left for abandoning "ordinary people" in favor of urban progressive elites. In contrast, other scholars warn that such strategies risk reproducing far-right framings without yielding electoral gains. They instead advocate for intersectional alliances rooted in solidarity among marginalized groups, grounded in inclusive democratic values. These debates are shaped by national contexts, electoral systems, and the particular forms populism takes in different settings.

== History ==
Whereas populism is generally considered a modern phenomenon, and the term itself only appeared in the late nineteenth century, some scholars have attempted to identify earlier manifestations of populist politics. Populism has thus been retrospectively associated with the democracy of classical Athens, with the Levellers of seventeenth-century England, who have sometimes been labelled "populists" because of their belief that equal natural rights should shape political life, and with movements such as the Protestant Reformation.

=== Europe ===
In the late 19th century Russian Empire, the narodnichestvo movement emerged, championing the cause of the peasantry against governing elites. Although it failed to achieve its aims, it is widely regarded as the first populist movement and inspired the Russian revolutions as well as other agrarian movements across eastern Europe in the early 20th century.

In German-speaking Europe, the völkisch movement has often been characterised as populist due to its exaltation of the German people and anti-elitist attacks on capitalism and Jews. In France, the Boulangist movement similarly employed populist rhetoric and themes.

In post-war Europe, a number of right-wing populist parties emerged across the continent. These developments largely reflected a conservative agrarian backlash against the growing centralisation and politicisation of the agricultural sector. Examples include Guglielmo Giannini's Common Man's Front in 1940s Italy, Pierre Poujade's Union for the Defense of Tradesmen and Artisans in late 1950s France, Hendrik Koekoek's Farmers' Party in the Netherlands during the 1960s, and Mogens Glistrup's Progress Party in 1970s Denmark. Few of these actors explicitly identified themselves as populists, although the French far-right activist François Duprat notably described the extreme right as "populist".

Following the fall of the Soviet Union and the collapse of the Eastern Bloc in the early 1990s, populism rose across much of Central and Eastern Europe. The Czech Civic Forum party, for example, campaigned with the slogan "Parties are for party members, Civic Forum is for everybody". Many populists in the region argued that the transition to liberal democracy had failed to produce a "real" revolution and claimed to represent the forces seeking such change.

At the turn of the 21st century, populist rhetoric and movements became increasingly visible in Western Europe. Such rhetoric was often employed by opposition parties and was again largely associated with the political right. The term came to refer both to far right groups such as Jörg Haider's FPÖ in Austria and Jean-Marie Le Pen's FN in France, as well as Silvio Berlusconi's Forza Italia in Italy and Pim Fortuyn's LPF in the Netherlands. The populist radical right combined populism with authoritarianism and nativism. Explicit self-identification with the label has nevertheless remained relatively rare and often strategic, as the term is sometimes perceived as less stigmatizing than other ideological designations, as illustrated by Marine Le Pen's statement that the label did not trouble her.

Conversely, the Great Recession contributed to the rise of left-wing populist movements in parts of Europe, most notably the Syriza party in Greece and Podemos in Spain. These actors often expressed Euroscepticism, though largely from socialist and anti-austerity perspectives rather than the nationalist framing typical of the right. The UK Labour Party under Jeremy Corbyn has likewise been described as populist, while figures such as Jean-Luc Mélenchon have acknowledged using political strategies sometimes characterised as populist, notably during a 2012 debate with Chantal Mouffe and Ernesto Laclau, even as he described the term "populism" as excessively loaded and problematic.

Following the 2016 UK referendum on EU membership, in which British voters chose to leave the European Union, some commentators interpreted Brexit as a victory for populism, prompting calls by populist parties in other EU countries for similar referendums.

=== North America ===
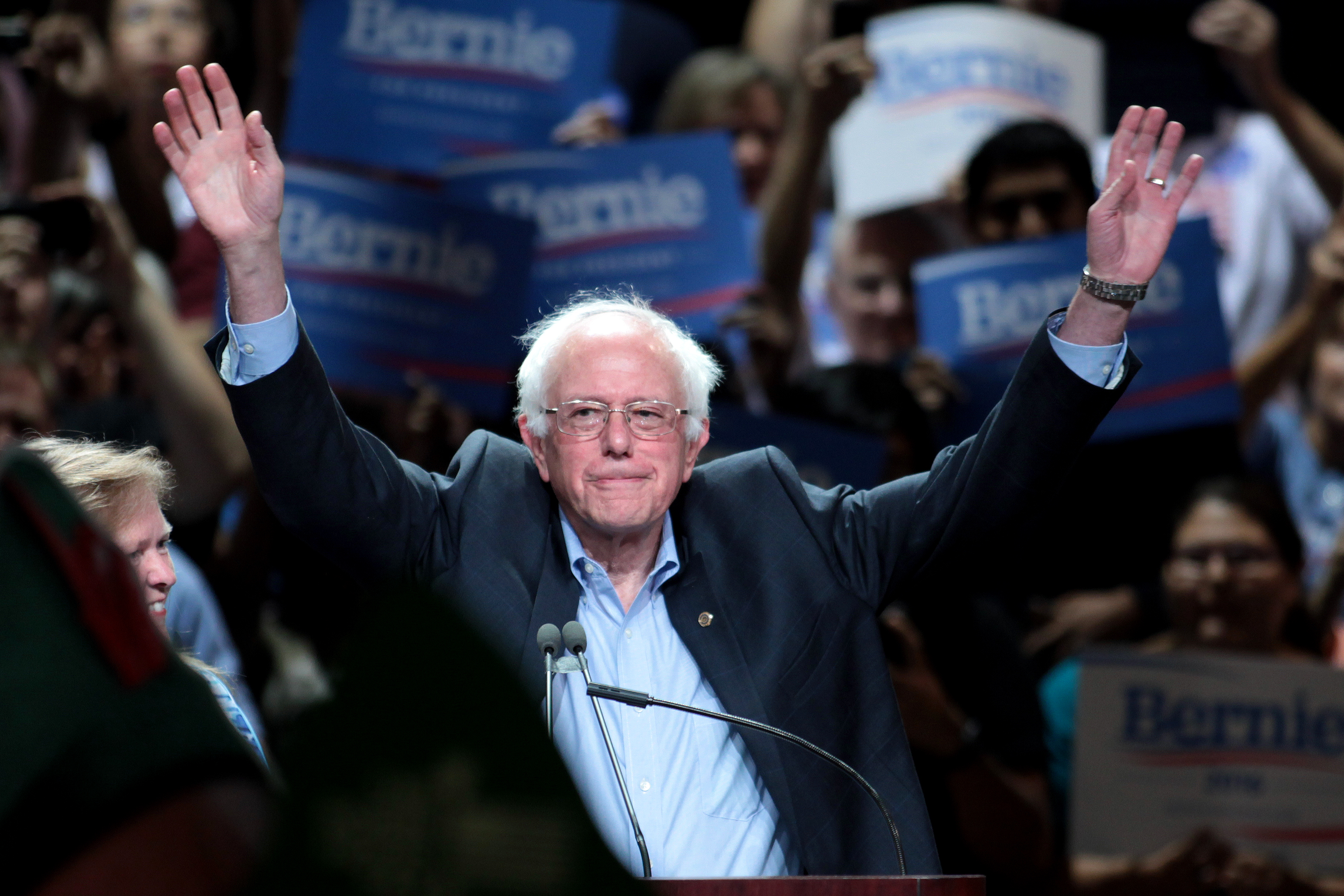
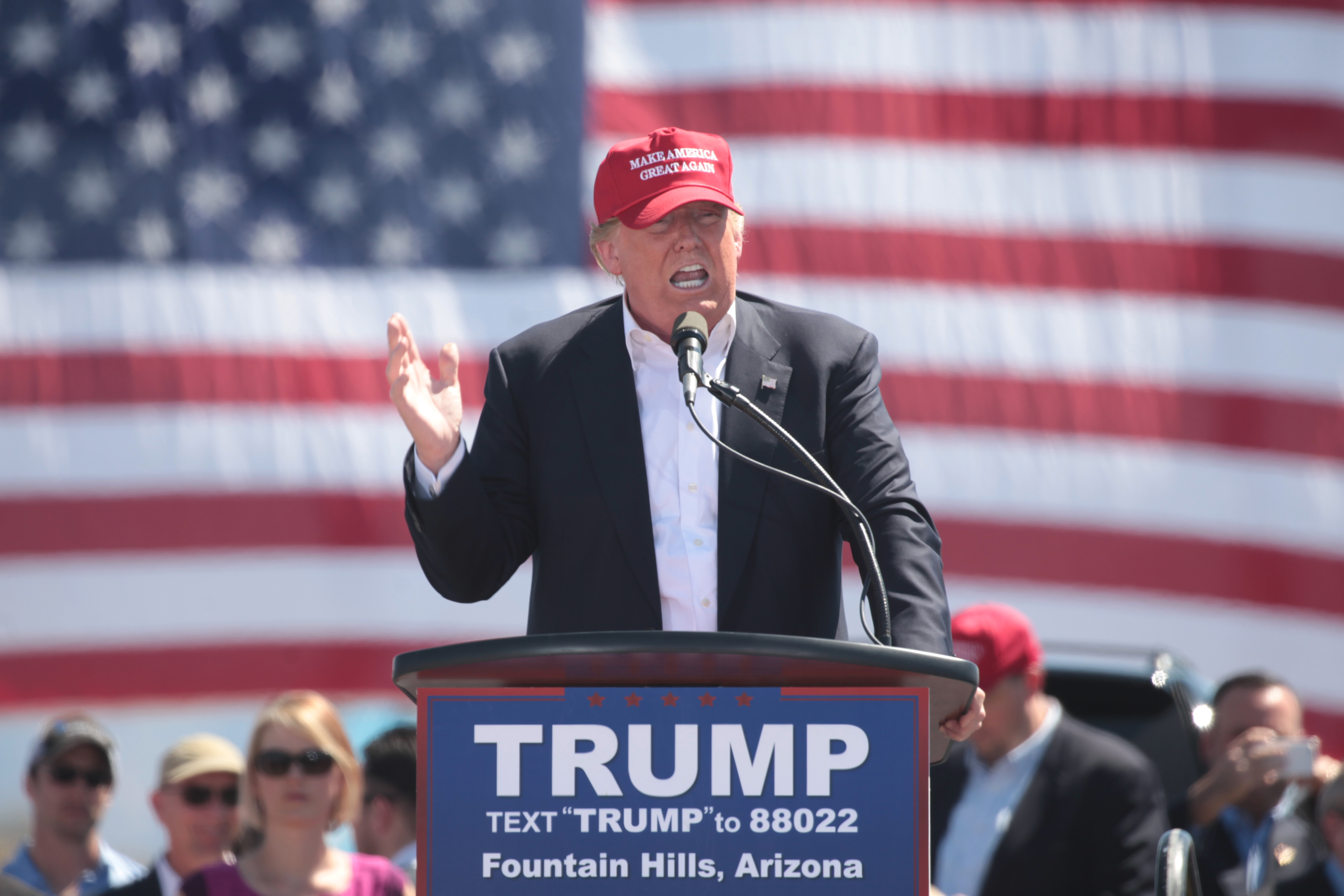
The 2016 presidential election saw a wave of populist sentiment in the campaigns of Bernie Sanders and Donald Trump, with both candidates running on anti-establishment platforms in the Democratic and Republican parties, respectively.

In North America, populism has often been characterised by regional mobilisation and loose organisation. During the late 19th and early 20th centuries, populist sentiments became widespread, particularly in the western provinces of Canada, and in the southwest and Great Plains regions of the United States. In this instance, populism was combined with agrarianism and often known as "prairie populism". For these groups, "the people" were yeomen—small, independent farmers—while the "elite" were the bankers and politicians of the northeast. In some cases, populist activists called for alliances with labor (the first national platform of the National People's Party in 1892 calling for protecting the rights of "urban workmen". In the state of Georgia in the early 1890s, Thomas E. Watson led a major effort to unite poor white farmers, and included some African-American farmers.

The People's Party of the late 19th century United States is considered to be "one of the defining populist movements"; its members were often referred to as the Populists at the time. Its radical platform included calling for the nationalisation of railways, the banning of strikebreakers, and the introduction of referendums. The party gained representation in several state legislatures during the 1890s, but was not powerful enough to mount a successful presidential challenge. In the 1896 presidential election, the People's Party supported the Democratic Party candidate William Jennings Bryan; after his defeat, the People's Party's support plunged.

Other early populist political parties in the United States included the Greenback Party, the Progressive Party of 1924 led by Robert M. La Follette, Sr., and the Share Our Wealth movement of Huey P. Long in 1933–1935. In Canada, populist groups adhering to a social credit ideology had various successes at local and regional elections from the 1930s to the 1960s, although the main Social Credit Party of Canada never became a dominant national force.

By the mid-20th century, US populism had moved from a largely progressive to a largely reactionary stance, being closely intertwined with the anti-communist politics of the period. In this period, the historian Richard Hofstadter and sociologist Daniel Bell compared the anti-elitism of the 1890s Populists with that of Joseph McCarthy. Although not all academics accepted the comparison between the left-wing, anti-big business Populists and the right-wing, anti-communist McCarthyites, the term "populist" nonetheless came to be applied to both left-wing and right-wing groups that blamed elites for the problems facing the country.

Some mainstream politicians in the Republican Party recognised the utility of such a tactic and adopted it; Republican President Richard Nixon for instance popularised the term "silent majority" when appealing to voters. Right-wing populist rhetoric was also at the base of two of the most successful third-party presidential campaigns in the late 20th century, that of George C. Wallace in 1968 and Ross Perot in 1992. These politicians presented a consistent message that a "liberal elite" was threatening "our way of life" and using the welfare state to placate the poor and thus maintain their own power.

Former Oklahoma Senator Fred R. Harris, first elected in 1964, ran unsuccessfully for the US presidency in 1972 and 1976. Harris' New Populism embraced egalitarian themes.

In the first decade of the 21st century, two populist movements appeared in the US, both in response to the Great Recession: the Occupy movement and the Tea Party movement. The populist approach of the Occupy movement was broader, with its "people" being what it called "the 99%", while the "elite" it challenged was presented as both the economic and political elites. The Tea Party's populism was Producerism, while "the elite" it presented was more party partisan than that of Occupy, being defined largely—although not exclusively—as the Democratic administration of President Barack Obama.

The 2016 presidential election saw a wave of populist sentiment in the campaigns of Bernie Sanders and Donald Trump, with both candidates running on anti-establishment platforms in the Democratic and Republican parties, respectively. Both campaigns criticised free trade deals such as the North American Free Trade Agreement and the Trans-Pacific Partnership but differed significantly on other issues, such as immigration. Other studies have noted an emergence of populist rhetoric and a decline in the value of prior experience in U.S. intra-party contests such as congressional primaries. Nativism and hostility toward immigrants (especially Muslims, Hispanics and Asians) were common features.

=== Latin America ===
Populism has been a recurring and influential feature of Latin American politics since the 1940s, often emerging in contexts marked by the expansion of mass politics and the entry of previously underrepresented social sectors into the political arena. Across the region, it has been associated with charismatic leadership in societies with weakly structured class systems, taking different ideological forms over time.

The first wave of Latin American populism emerged in the post-war period and lasted until the 1960s. It was characterized by leaders who mobilized "the people" against oligarchic elites, such as Getúlio Vargas in Brazil and Juan Domingo Perón in Argentina. In Argentina, Peronism was consolidated through the mass mobilization of 17 October 1945 (the Day of Loyalty), often considered its founding moment, notably involving previously marginalized sectors such as the cabecitas negras. Early interpretations did not rely on the concept of populism: after Perón's overthrow in 1955, Jorge Abelardo Ramos described Peronism as a form of Bonapartism, while Gino Germani conceptualized it as a "national-popular" movement linked to rapid modernization and the incorporation of the masses.

In Brazil, the term "populism" entered political vocabulary in the same period, initially used by sectors of the authoritarian right as a political accusation against Vargas, reflecting their hostility to the growing political participation of the masses. It was subsequently partially reappropriated by figures such as Ademar de Barros. Despite critical academic uses, the term remained largely non-pejorative until the 1964 coup. Labor-based populism continued under João Goulart and Leonel Brizola, while the right reached executive power by supporting the populist candidacy of Jânio Quadros in 1960.

The second wave developed in the late 1980s and early 1990s. Populist leaders such as Carlos Menem in Argentina, Fernando Collor de Mello in Brazil, and Alberto Fujimori in Peru combined anti-elite rhetoric with the implementation of neoliberal reforms, often aligned with recommendations from the International Monetary Fund.

The third wave began in the late 1990s and extended into the 21st century, in the so-called pink tide. It was characterized by left-wing populist governments emphasizing social inclusion, state intervention, and opposition to economic elites. Prominent examples include Hugo Chávez in Venezuela, Evo Morales in Bolivia, and Rafael Correa in Ecuador, as well as Néstor Kirchner and Cristina Fernández de Kirchner in Argentina. In Brazil, although the Workers' Party initially emerged in opposition to earlier forms of populism, some scholars argue that the presidency of Luiz Inácio Lula da Silva partially reactivated elements of the Vargas tradition, combining charismatic leadership, redistribution, and the incorporation of popular sectors, leading some analysts to describe Lulism as a democratizing form of left-wing populism.

More recently, new forms of populism have emerged. The election of Jair Bolsonaro in Brazil in 2018 has been interpreted as the resurgence of a far-right populism combining anti-elite discourse, moral conservatism, and hostility to institutional mediation, while the victory of Javier Milei in the 2023 presidential election has been widely described as the rise of a libertarian populism combining anti-system rhetoric with a radical critique of the state and a break with the Peronist tradition.

=== Middle East and North Africa ===
In North Africa, populism was associated with the approaches of several political leaders active in the 20th century. However, populist approaches only became more popular in the Middle East during the early 21st century, by which point it became integral to much of the region's politics. Although the Arab Spring was not a populist movement itself, populist rhetoric was present among protesters.

In Israel, the accession of Menachem Begin to power in 1977 is often considered by some scholars to be a key moment in the emergence of right-wing populism. His electoral base relied largely on social groups long relegated to the margins of Israeli society, particularly Mizrahi Jews from the Middle East and North Africa. These populations experienced social and symbolic marginalization within a system historically dominated by Ashkenazi elites. In this perspective, Begin appears as a leader capable of mobilizing these groups and granting them unprecedented political and symbolic recognition, while leaving existing social hierarchies largely intact.

The rise of Benjamin Netanyahu from the late 1990s fits within this continuity while introducing some changes. His leadership has also relied on support from these same popular constituencies, often marked by experiences of downward mobility or socio-spatial marginalization. However, his political style is often interpreted as a shift toward a form of populism centered on criticism of political, judicial and media elites, combined with a more clearly liberal economic orientation.

=== Sub-Saharan Africa ===
In much of Africa, populism has been a rare phenomenon. The political scientist Danielle Resnick argued that populism first became apparent in Africa during the 1980s, when a series of coups brought military leaders to power in various countries. In Ghana, for example, Jerry Rawlings took control, professing that he would involve "the people" in "the decision-making process", something he claimed had previously been denied to them. A similar process took place in neighbouring Burkina Faso under the military leader Thomas Sankara, who professed to "take power out of the hands of our national bourgeoisie and their imperialist allies and put it in the hands of the people". Such military leaders claimed to represent "the voice of the people", used an anti-establishment discourse, and established participatory organisations through which to maintain links with the broader population.

In the 21st century, with the establishment of multi-party democratic systems in much of Sub-Saharan Africa, new populist politicians have appeared. These have included Kenya's Raila Odinga, Senegal's Abdoulaye Wade, South Africa's Julius Malema, and Zambia's Michael Sata. These populists have arisen in democratic rather than authoritarian states, and have arisen amid dissatisfaction with democratisation, socio-economic grievances, and frustration at the inability of opposition groups to oust incumbent parties.

=== Asia ===
In southeast Asia, populist politicians emerged in the wake of the 1997 Asian financial crisis. In the region, various populist governments took power but were removed soon after: these include the administrations of Joseph Estrada in the Philippines, Roh Moo-hyun in South Korea, Chen Shui-bian in Taiwan, and Thaksin Shinawatra in Thailand.

In India, earlier forms of "caste populism" were characterized by the political mobilization of lower and intermediate castes, which sought to represent historically marginalized groups as the "people" against upper-caste elites and entrenched social hierarchies. From the late 20th century onwards, however, this configuration was gradually rearticulated with the rise of the Hindu nationalist Bharatiya Janata Party (BJP), which gained increasing power in the early 21st century under the leadership of Narendra Modi and has been described as adopting a right-wing populist position. Under Modi, populist discourse shifted toward a Hindu majoritarian framework that enabled the construction of a unified religious "people" across caste divisions, while often subsuming persistent inequalities and allowing socially dominant groups to project their particular interests as the general will, frequently marginalizing subaltern and minority voices.

=== Oceania ===
During the 1990s, there was a growth in populism in both Australia and New Zealand.

In New Zealand Robert Muldoon, the 31st Prime Minister of New Zealand from 1975 to 1984, had been cited as a populist. Populism has become a pervasive trend in New Zealand politics since the introduction of the mixed-member proportional voting system in 1996. The New Zealand Labour Party's populist appeals in its 1999 election campaign and advertising helped to propel the party to victory in that election. New Zealand First has presented a more lasting populist platform; long-time party leader Winston Peters has been characterised by some as a populist who uses anti-establishment rhetoric, though in a uniquely New Zealand style.

Populism in Australia entered mainstream discussion after the first Trump presidency in the United States, in which the populist framing of a global elite was also pitched in Australia by Scott Morrison, the prime minister after his 'miracle' election in 2019. This mix of 'authoritarian' and 'suburban' populism included rhetoric against welfare recipients, climate change action, the media, and human rights demands. It was also described as a shift in the Liberal–National Coalition that began during the Howard government from 1996 to 2007. Despite scandals, Morrison's rhetoric was likely blunted by Australia's democratic institutions. However, populist political messaging has continued to be used after his party's subsequent election losses, and has become tied with its overtaking in the polls by the far-right populist One Nation party. In May 2026, One Nation won its first lower-house seat in Parliament after the Liberal Party deposed its incumbent leader in a bid to counter One Nation by appealing further to the right.

== See also ==
- Labourism
- Neopopulism
- Fiscal populism
- Argumentum ad populum
- Black populism
- Class warfare
- Communitarianism
- Demagogue
- Elite theory
- Empire of Democracy
- Extremism
- Fanaticism
- Fundamentalism
- List of populists
- Iron law of oligarchy
- Judicial populism
- Ochlocracy (mob rule)
- Paternalism
- Penal populism
- Politainment
- Polite populism
- Political polarization
- Poporanism
- Populism in Latin America
- Populist paradox
- Radical politics
- Reactionism
- Third party (politics)
- Tyranny of the majority
- Populist caucus
