= Polite =

Polite may refer to:

- Politeness
- Polite (magazine), an American humor magazine
- Polite architecture or "the Polite", an architectural theory and style
- Polite populism, a variant of populism
- Lousaka Polite (born 1981), former American football fullback
