= 1963 Dutch farmers' revolt =

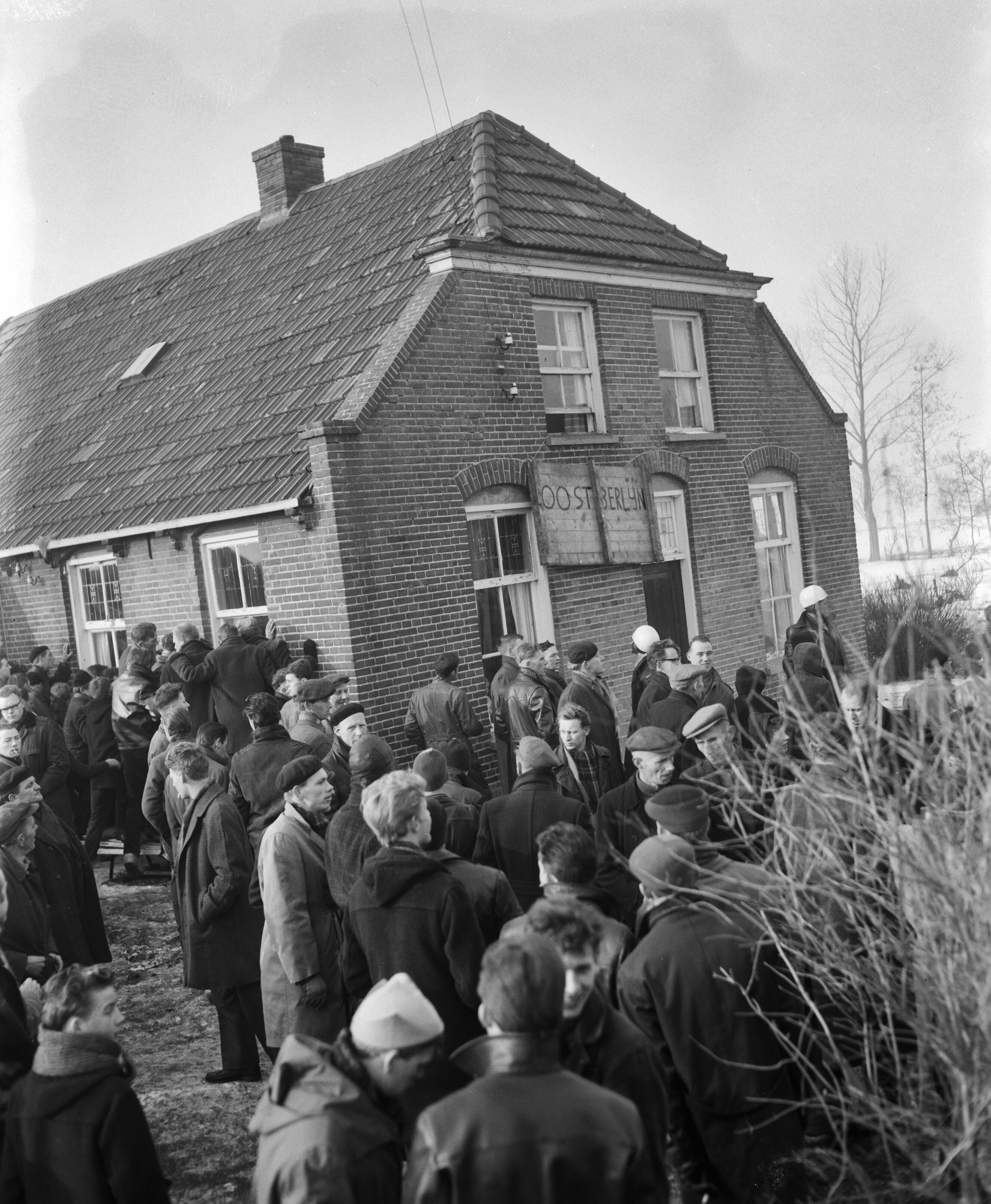
The eviction of the "Free Farmers" from their properties. One of the farms had a sign with the words Oost-Berlijn.

The 1963 Dutch farmers' revolt (Dutch: Boerenopstand van 1963) in Hollandscheveld, the Netherlands, was a rebellion led by Dutch farmer and politician Hendrik Koekoek against the Landbouwschap over the eviction of three farmer families. The rebellion was also referred to as the Revolt of the Braves (Dutch: Opstand der Braven).

In March 1963, three farmer families were evicted from their farms by order of the Landbouwschap because they had refused on principle to pay agricultural levies and because they lived on the farms illegally, as these were owned by the Landbouwschap. Thousands of so-called "Free Farmers" (Dutch: Vrije Boeren) from all over the Netherlands—followers of Koekoek—went to Hollandscheveld to try to prevent the eviction. The government set up a force majeure of more than 200 helmeted and armed police officers to keep the demonstrating farmers away from the places where the debt collector did his work. Riots ensued. The police drove the people away from the farms with tear gas and batons. One of the evacuated farms went up in flames overnight. The perpetrators of the arson were never found. The Landbouwschap, which had never had any experience with evictions before, gave in after all the negative media attention and eventually came to a compensation arrangement with the Hollandscheveld farmer families.

Due to the involvement of farmer Koekoek, the revolt led to widespread awareness of and support for his Farmers' Party, which won three seats in the House of Representatives in the subsequent general election.

== See also ==
- 1971 Dutch farmers' revolt
- 1989–1990 Dutch farmers' protests
- Dutch farmers' protests
