= Jan de Groote =

Dutch politician (1911–1989)

Jan de Groote (10 July 1911 in Beilen – 14 March 1989 in Hoogeveen) was a Dutch farmer and politician of the Farmers' Party (Boerenpartij - BP). He was a councillor of Beilen from 1966 to 1970 and also a Senator from 1966 to 1971.

De Groote was a member of the Dutch Reformed Church, and brother-in-law of BP leader Hendrik Koekoek.
