= La narración de la historia =

1959 Argentinian short story

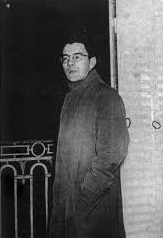
- Author Carlos Correas in 1959
- Author: Carlos Correas
- Language: Spanish
- Genre: Short story
- Publication date: 1959
- Publication place: Argentina

La narración de la historia (English: The narration of the story) is a short story by Argentine writer Carlos Correas, published in 1959 in the Centro magazine. It is recognized for being the first explicit homosexual themed Argentine literature. The plot follows the story of a young man named Ernesto who meets another man, Juan Carlos, at a train station. Both of them wander around the city and develop a relationship, which forms the remaining part of the story.

The story and its theme was controversial, and the authorities filed a judicial complaint for pornography and immorality against the author, which led to a suspended sentence of six months in prison and the author's decision to temporarily give up writing.

== Synopsis ==
Ernesto Savid is a young law student. He wanders around theaters and the halls of the Constitución railway station often in search of sexual encounters with other men. One day he finds a 17-year-old boy named Juan Carlos Crespo in the station. After chatting for a while, they venture out to wander around the city, and later head to a vacant plot, where they have a sexual encounter.

After a while, Ernesto and Juan Carlos meet again, after which they begin to explore the possibility of having a life together. However, Ernesto is confused as certain aspects of the dynamics of their relationship disturb him. The next day, Ernesto meets two friends who took dance classes with him and decides to go with one of them while leaving Juan Carlos, who was waiting for him. He goes to sleep with the new friend in his friend's apartment. This relationship makes Ernesto feel happy and calm, so he manages to sleep much better at night than in previous days.

== Publication and legal case ==
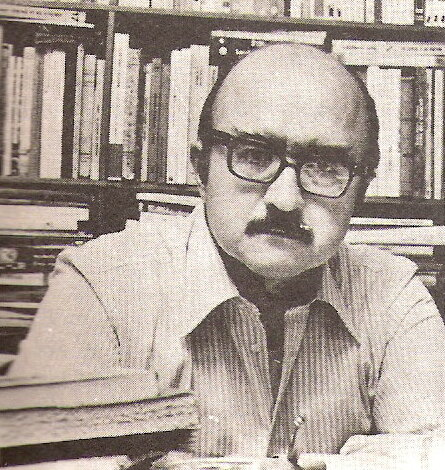
Jorge Lafforgue, the director of the magazine Centro during the publication of the story in 1959

The story was published in December 1959 in the issue number 14 of the Centro, the official magazine of the student center of the faculty of philosophy and letters of the University of Buenos Aires. Writer Jorge Lafforgue was the director of the magazine, and according to him, only himself and fellow writer Oscar Masotta supported the publishing of the story, while the rest of the editorial board members never gave clear signs of approval or positioned themselves against the inclusion of the story. Correas decided precisely to dedicate the story to a member of the committee, Celia Durruty, with the intention of creating bewilderment in the people who criticized the work, because she intuited that they would be surprised that a story about homosexuality was dedicated to a woman, as indeed happened when she was brought to trial.

About six months after the publication of the story, prosecutor Guillermo de la Riestra filed a lawsuit against the author Carlos Correas, and Lafforgue and the editorial committee of the magazine for immorality and pornography, based on article 128 of the Argentine Criminal Code, due to the homosexual theme of the story. During the judicial process, while other members of magazine's editorial committee were exonerated, Correas and Lafforgue were handed suspended prison sentences of six and three months respectively. All copies of the particular issue of the magazine were also ordered to be seized, and this became the last published issue of the magazine. After two years of judicial proceedings, the conviction against both was upheld by the Buenos Aires Chamber of Appeals in March 1962.

According to Lafforgue, the complaint and punishment handed over to him and Correas was taken by the authorities as a way of attacking what they saw as an "emerging of a homosexual plot", and was a way of getting at the magazine, and the university for allowing it. The local newspaper La Nación, in an article titled "Confusion and loss", on 17 May 1960, criticized Correas and author Germán Rozenmacher, who had commented that the story was acceptable to him except for certain scenes.

Due to the persecution and criticism suffered as a result of the publication of the story, Correas decided to give up writing for a while, in addition to stating that he would "abandon" the theme of homosexuality. Correas did not publish any work again until 1984, when he released the book Los reportajes de Félix Chaneton, which narrates the story of a bisexual man who is ashamed of his sexual orientation.

In the later years, La narración de la historia appeared in some anthologies of gay literature, such as Homosexuario (1969) and Historia de un deseo. Erotismo homosexual (2000). In 1993, it was integrated in a compilation titled Las Fieras by Ricardo Piglia.

== Analysis and reception ==
According to professor José Javier Maristany, Correas seems to have chosen the title with the intention of giving the least possible advance information about the plot, which represented the unspeakable in the Argentine literature during the mid-twentieth century. In 1954, the author had published a story, El revólver ("The Revolver"), that addressed homosexuality, although in that case it had only been suggested and not explicitly specified despite it being of vital importance to the plot. Unlike that story, which constantly circled around the subject without explicitly calling it, in La narración de la historia, Correas openly explores the subject of sexual relationship between the two male characters.

One of the most emphasized ideas in the story is the strict definition of the sexual roles that Ernesto and Juan Carlos adopt in their relationship. From the moment they meet, Juan Carlos quickly points out that "in sexual relations he was a man and nothing else", to which Ernesto replies that this was evident because he saw "that penetrating gaze characteristic of men and absent in inverts". The topic is addressed again in subsequent conversations, as in the following dialogue in which Ernesto begins by saying:

Besides, we would be a couple, like so many others. (...) You would bring your naturalness, your violence, and your healthy unconsciousness as a proletarian boy, and I my refinement, my culture, and my cynicism. You would be the barbarian conqueror who ultimately ends up defeated and conquered, as history tells us.

And I, then, would be your... your man, your male?

Oh, we would understand each other. But truly, you would be my little boy, my doll, my chongo."

Although Ernesto initially accepts the idea and even suggests that at some point he could stop working and stay at home to prepare food for Juan Carlos while he works, which is a usual practice in heterosexual couples, he later begins to feel uncomfortable with the "feminization" he was acquiring in the relationship. According to Maristany, this is what leads him to distance himself from Juan Carlos and instead approach a man who, on the contrary, makes him feel "as if he had been with a woman", which reassures him.

Another theme explored in the text is the homoerotic fascination with people belonging to the working classes, a theme present in some earlier works that served as precursors to the book such as El inmoralista (1902) by André Gide, El juguete rabioso (1926) by Roberto Arlt, and some of the works of Jean Genet, who was one of Correas's greatest influences. In general, the subject aroused great interest in the author, who, according to journalist Alejandra Varela, personally felt this attraction and at times, during his student years, went out with Juan José Sebreli in search of men in the poorer neighborhoods of the city. Correas even submitted an essay to the magazine Contorno that presented the figure of the cabecita negra as an erotic and revolutionary symbol, although it was not published and was ultimately lost.

Regarding the censorship of the work, Maristany states that it appeared at a turning point when voices began to emerge that sought to break with the social model that exalted virility and was promoted by various ideological sectors. These attempts, however, provoked a strong reaction from the more conservative sectors of Argentine society, which viewed non-traditional forms of sexuality—particularly homosexuality—as social anomalies. It was in this context that the story was censored, a fate shared by other literary works published in the country at the time, such as La carne de la orquídea (1949) by James Hadley Chase, Lolita (1955) by Vladimir Nabokov, and Nanina (1968) by Germán García. By contrast, works such as El marica (1959) by Abelardo Castillo were not censored, despite addressing the same subject, because they portrayed homosexuality through stigmatization rather than openness.

== Legacy ==
In recent years, the story and the history around its publication have been addressed in film and theater, as part of the broader process of reappraising Correas' writing. In 2012, the documentary film, Ante la ley. El relato prohibido de Carlos Correas ("Before the law. The forbidden story of Carlos Correas", directed by Emiliano Jelicié and Pablo Klappenbach, was released. The film included an adaptation of the book and the subsequent investigation into the judicial process against Correas following the story's publication and a series of interviews with friends and acquaintances of the author to reconstruct the different facets of his life.

Argentine playwright Gustavo Tarrío's 2025 play Ha muerto un puto recollects several moments of the life of Carlos Correas, in particular the trial against him because of the publication of the story and his sentencing to prison.
