= Populist paradox =

Concept in political science concerning populism and direct democracy

The populist paradox is a term used in political science and political economy for several related apparent contradictions in populism. In its original and most specific sense, the term comes from the title of a 1999 book by the political scientist Elisabeth Gerber, which examined the claim that direct legislation — instruments such as the popular initiative and the referendum, promoted by Populist and Progressive reformers to curb the power of wealthy interests — had come to be dominated by those same interests. The phrase has since been applied more loosely to the observation that populist leaders often remain electorally resilient despite policies that appear to harm the voters who support them, and to the tension faced by anti-elite parties once they themselves enter government.

== Direct legislation ==
=== Background ===
From the late 19th century onward, reform movements in the United States — among them the Populist and Progressive movements — promoted direct legislation as a way to counter the influence of narrow, well-resourced minorities over elected representatives. By the late 20th century, critics argued that this arrangement had been turned on its head: because interest groups spent heavily on ballot campaigns, policymaking at the ballot box was said to have become a tool of economic interests rather than of the broad public. Gerber called this charge the "populist paradox", noting that many observers regarded direct legislation as having been captured by the wealthy interests it was designed to restrain.

=== Gerber's study ===
Gerber argued that the capture critique rested largely on anecdote and speculation, and set out to test it systematically. Her evidence combined surveys of interest groups' activities and motivations with campaign finance records from 168 direct legislation campaigns in eight states. She distinguished between economic groups, such as businesses and professional associations, and citizen groups with broad memberships, and developed hypotheses about how each type would use the initiative process.

Her central finding was that heavy spending does not automatically translate into influence. Voters who oppose a proposal are rarely won over by expensive campaigns, a lesson that insurers, trial lawyers and tobacco companies had learned through defeats at the ballot box. Economic groups were found to be effective mainly at blocking measures proposed by others and at using the threat of initiatives to pressure legislators, whereas citizen groups with broad support and substantial organizational resources were more successful at passing new laws. Gerber therefore concluded that economic interests are better at preserving the status quo, while citizen interests are better at changing it.

=== Reception ===
Reviewing the book in the Journal of Political Ecology, Gerlach observed that Gerber's findings still leave a genuine paradox in place, since even the indirect, status-quo-preserving influence of economic groups runs counter to what the Populist and Progressive reformers intended.

== Electoral resilience of populist leaders ==
A second usage refers to the persistence of populist leaders in office despite poor economic results. A 2010 article in Kellogg Insight by Beeland described as a "populist paradox" the question of why voters re-elect leaders such as Hugo Chávez after policies that appear to damage their own economic interests.

=== Signalling explanation ===
Acemoglu, Egorov and Sonin proposed a rational-choice account in which populist policy is a form of signalling. When voters fear that politicians may be corrupted or influenced by a wealthy elite, an honest politician seeking re-election can choose policies to the left of the median voter to show that he is not beholden to right-wing interests, and politicians who are in fact so influenced respond by moving left as well. In their model this populist bias is stronger when the value of holding office is higher, when the gap between the median voter's preferences and those of right-wing interests is larger, and when politicians are perceived as more likely to be corrupt; they also show that soft term limits can worsen rather than reduce the bias. The authors presented the model as an explanation that does not depend on voters being short-sighted or misinformed.

=== Economic costs and persistence ===
Funke, Schularick and Trebesch assembled a long-run cross-country database identifying 51 populist presidents and prime ministers between 1900 and 2020. They estimated that 15 years after a populist takes office, GDP per capita is about 10 percent lower than in a plausible non-populist counterfactual, and that populist rule typically coincides with economic disintegration, reduced macroeconomic stability and the erosion of institutions.

Drawing on these results, Szeidl and Szucs described the combination of economic underperformance with populists' tendency to remain in office roughly twice as long as comparable leaders as a "populist paradox". In a formal model, Szeidl and Szucs treat populism as the spread of a false "alternative reality" in which the intellectual elite is portrayed as conspiring against the populist for ideological reasons. If enough voters accept this narrative, truthful criticism from experts is discredited and political accountability declines; because elite criticism fits the narrative, it can even strengthen receptive voters' support for the populist. The model further predicts that populists may adopt harmful policies, which can fall disproportionately on non-elite citizens, in order to reinforce belief in the alternative reality.

== Populists in government ==
A related tension arises when populist parties, whose appeal rests on opposition to the establishment, become part of it. Heinisch argued that the features that allow right-wing populist parties to succeed in opposition and at elections turn into disadvantages once they hold office, and that structural weaknesses inherent in such parties make their long-term success in government doubtful. A 2022 review by Caiani and Graziano summarized a body of research finding that populist parties in government tend to moderate their positions and become less populist, which normally results in electoral losses, but noted that this "inclusion–moderation" thesis is not consistently supported: other studies find mainstreaming, radicalization or ideological flexibility in office.

Against the view that populists inevitably fail in power, Müller argued that, contrary to conventional wisdom, populists can govern on the basis of their claim to represent the people exclusively, and that populists with enough power tend to build an authoritarian state that excludes those not counted among the "real" people.

== See also ==
- Populism
- Direct democracy
- Initiatives and referendums in the United States
- Interest group
- Regulatory capture
- Paradox of voting
