= Johannes Post =

Dutch resistance leader

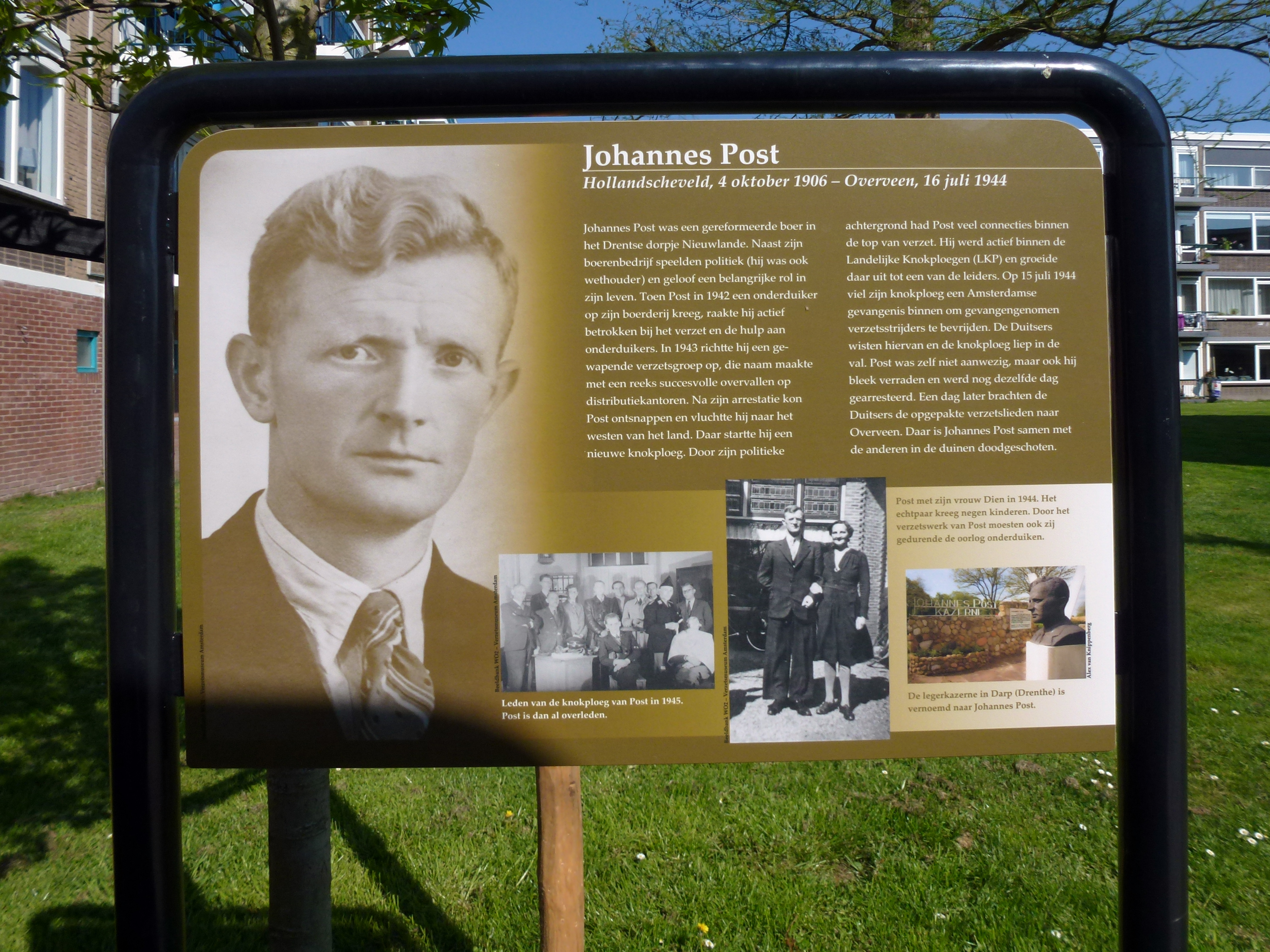
- A memorial sign for Post in Gouda, South Holland
- Born: October 4, 1906; Hollandscheveld
- Died: 16 July 1944 (aged 37); Overveen

Johannes Post (4 October 1906 – 16 July 1944) was a Dutch resistance leader during the Nazi occupation of the Netherlands. He helped lead part of the Landelijke Knokploegen and hid Jews in his village, Nieuwlande. Post was recognized as Righteous Among the Nations in 1965.

== Early life ==
Johannes Post was born on October 4, 1906, in the village of Hollandscheveld. He was the eleventh and youngest child of Jan-Wolters Post and Trijntje Tempen. He attended primary school, and afterwards attended one year of MULO before going to work at his father's company. Post became a farmer in Nieuwlande, alongside being an alderman and councilor in the municipality of Oosterhesselen. He also worked trading eggs, poultry and horses. Post was a member of the Anti-Revolutionary Party (ARP). On November 26, 1929, Post married Dien Salomons (1903-1991), having nine children together.

== Beginning of World War II ==
Post planned to go to the west of the Netherlands during May 1940 to fight the Germans but was unable to due to the rapid end of the fighting. Until 1942, he was involved in minor acts of resistance such as refusing to pay income tax and distributing illegal literature.

Marinus Post, one of Johannes' brothers was involved directly in the resistance, and while at his house in 1942, he met Arnold Douwes and Dr. Cohen. Cohen was a Jewish refugee, and he told Johannes about the ongoing persecution of Jews. Later, with the help of his brother Post traveled around the Netherlands, finding Jews and bringing them to Nieuwlande. They would be picked up by Dien Post, and brought to their farmhouse. Later, the individuals would be transferred to permanent houses to hide in. The houses where they hid were originally from their extended family, but eventually the townsfolk of Nieuwlande helped as well.

With the help of Arnold Douwes and Nico Leons, a network for hiding Jews in Nieuwlande and the surrounding area was established. Johannes would bring Jews to houses and persuade people into giving them shelter, using moral and religious arguments to convince the residents. He was also helped in this by his role in the community, previously being the deputy major of the local regional council, the head of his large family, and a successful farmer. Through Post's efforts, the community became a hotspot for hiding Jews. He stayed in contact with the leaders of the Anti-Revolutionary Party and the resistance through the Trouw newspaper.

While traveling to Amsterdam, Johannes met Celina Kuyper, a Jewish resistance member from Rotterdam. Kuyper started working as a courier for Post under an alias, Thea van Zuylen.

In Summer 1943, Post took part in raids on registration offices. These strikes were a response to the Nazis arresting soldiers from the former Dutch army and taking them to Germany to work on Arbeitseinsatz. Many of these soldiers went into hiding, which necessitated more goods to keep them fed. The registration offices held food coupons and other goods, making them the target for the raids. Soon after, Johannes went into hiding due to attention from the Nazis, but he was arrested soon after.

== Final Years ==
Kuyper and Post were arrested on July 16, 1943, in Ugchelen, Gelderland. Kuyper was sent by train to Auschwitz and murdered three days after her arrival. Johannes was jailed inside a police station, but was broken out by Jan Mennink, a local police officer. Soon after, Betsy "Tineke" Trompetter, another Jewish resistance member took over as Johannes' courier. However, due to his arrest, Post's family was no longer protected by the law and was considered outcast. The Germans planned to occupy the family's farmhouse, so the family moved out of Nieuwlande.

After this, the children of the Post family were constantly moved between the houses of relatives, which continued until the end of the war. Henk and Mein Post took in two of the children, Jan and Gerard into a vicarage, where Dien later hid from the authorities in. Johannes hid on his brother's farm in Pesse, Drenthe. Dien and Johannes hid in the area until October, avoiding participating in the local resistance. He left soon afterwards, going to Rijnsburg. In February of that year, the various resistance groups created an advisory group known as the 'kern'. It helped coordinate resistance activities between the groups. Post took part in this, and gained contacts within the Orde Dienst (OD) and the Jhr P.J. Six. He met the resistance of Brabart in November, but Post chose to stay with the National Knokploegen (LKP).

Post began carrying out robberies for the resistance, stealing weapons and ammo from police stations and other locations. In January 1944, Post alongside his compatriots stole supplies in South Holland and Western North Brabant. Post carried out a huge robbery at Archimedesstraat police station, making away with sixty pistols, ammunition and cartridge holders.

Post became increasingly close with the LKP's leadership, who helped provide food coupons to those in hiding. That March the LKP asked him to help coordinate groups in the northern provinces of the Netherlands: Drenthe, Groningen, and Friesland. In May 1944, the LKP was hampered by the arrests of high-profile leaders, leading Post to go to Amsterdam. In June, the Sicherheitspolizei arrested many resistance leaders in the northern provinces where Post worked which made it too risky for him to return. Post ended up going west, as the arrests had created openings in the leadership of the LKP. He ended up becoming the de facto leader of the LKP in the western Netherlands. He based his operations out of Amsterdam.

== Death ==
On June 23, 1944, a resistance raid on a distribution office in Haarlem failed, leaving one of Post's brothers, Wildschut imprisoned. Post made plans to break his brother out of the Amsterdam detention center with the help of a Dutch SS guard. Unbeknown to Post, the guard had told the Sicherheitspolizei about the plan. On July 14, while trying to sneak into the prison under the cover of night, the resistance members were ambushed. After a firefight, they were arrested alongside Post, who had not directly taken part in the robbery. Johannes and twelve other resistance members were driven out to the sand dunes outside Overveen, where they were murdered, then buried together in a mass grave. After the Netherlands were liberated by the Allies, Post's body was reburied at the Overveen Honorary Cemetery.

== Legacy ==
A military barrack in Havelte is named after Post, alongside a bridge in Leiden. A number of schools bear his name, including in Sneek, Amstelveen and Hazerswoude-Dorp. Streets have been named after Post in at least twenty-nine towns in the Netherlands. In Assen, a scouting association is named after him, the Johannes Post Group,

After the war, Post was posthumously awarded the 1940-1945 Resistance Cross by Royal Decree and The United States awarded him the Medal of Freedom. This medal was presented to his family on April 8, 1953, at The Hague. Johannes Post and the village of Nieuwlande were recognized as Righteous Among the Nations by Israel in recognition for their efforts to save Jews.

De Levensroman van Johannes Post (The Life of Johannes Post) written in 1948 by Anne de Vries is a well-known biography of Post. Partly because of this, he is one of the best-known resistance leaders of the Second World War. Before it was published in book form, it appeared as a serial in the magazine Ons Vrije Nederland.
