= 1971 Dutch farmers' revolt =

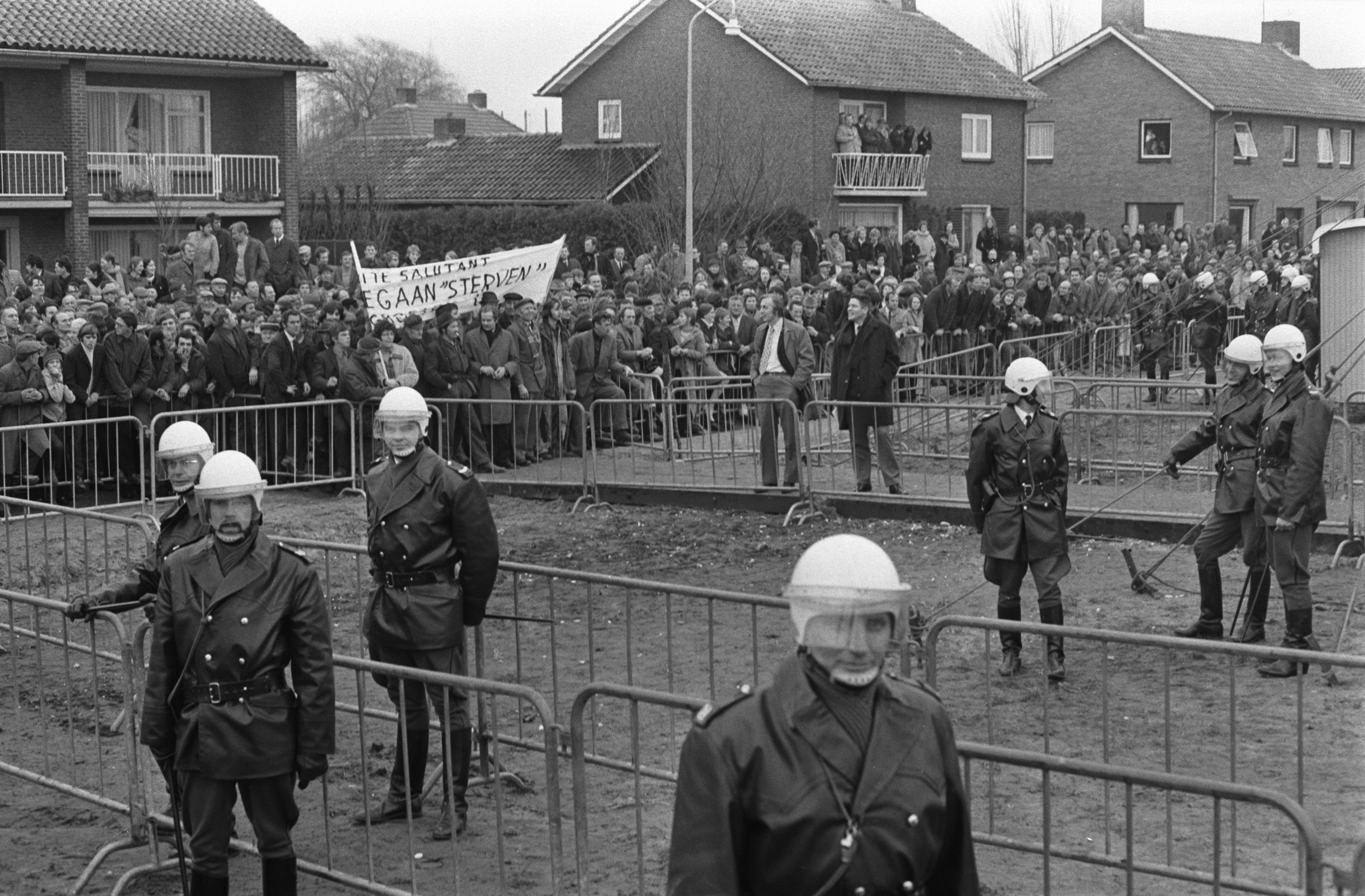
Farmers demonstrate as riot police guard the tent where voting took place.

The 1971 Dutch farmers' revolt (Dutch: Boerenopstand van 1971) took place on 21 December 1971 in the municipality of Tubbergen in Overijssel, the Netherlands. The rebellion was set off by an intended land consolidation of, in particular, agricultural land.

== Voting ==
In the stakeholder vote on the land consolidation plan there were 2,938 eligible voters, about 1,200 of whom were farmers. Only 27 votes were cast, 15 in favor and 12 against the proposal. Despite the low turnout, the plan was approved, because the votes that were not cast were considered to be in favor. This was seen as unfair by many residents of the municipality.

== Riots ==
Riots erupted in the villages of Tubbergen and Geesteren. The windows of the town hall were smashed and the residence of mayor Lodewijk Paul Hubertus Schepers was set on fire. Riot police was deployed and several people were injured, one police officer was even stabbed in the back. In 1972, a report on the events was discussed in the House of Representatives.

== Aftermath ==
On 26 March 1973, a new vote on the land consolidation took place. The plan was rejected by majority vote, after which it wasn't considered for implementation again.

In 2021, a theater production looked back on this turbulent episode. Fifty years later, there were still mixed feelings about the 'revolt' in Tubbergen.

== Images ==
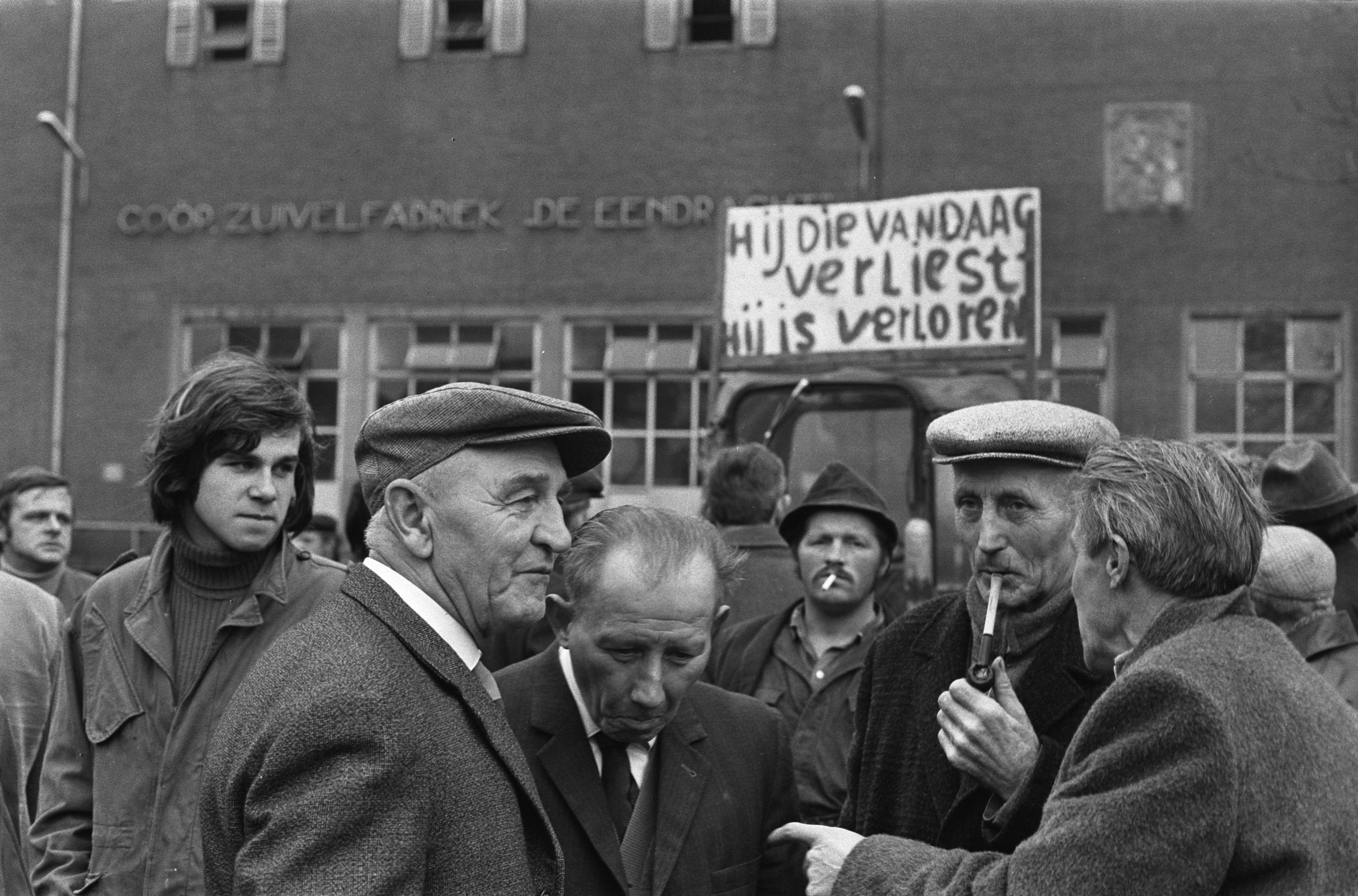
Farmers in front of a banner: He who loses today, he is lost.

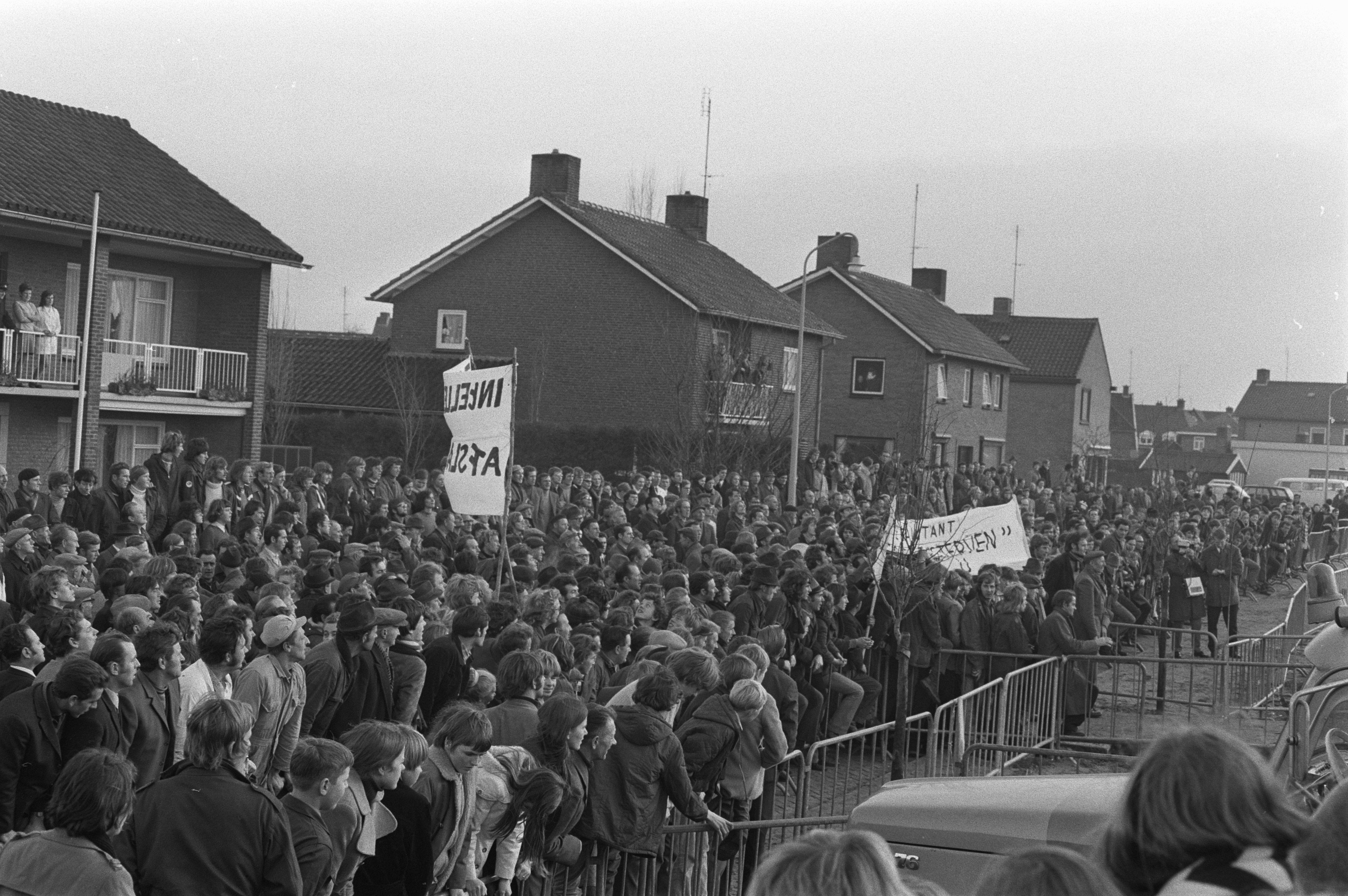
Protesters and residents outside the polling place.

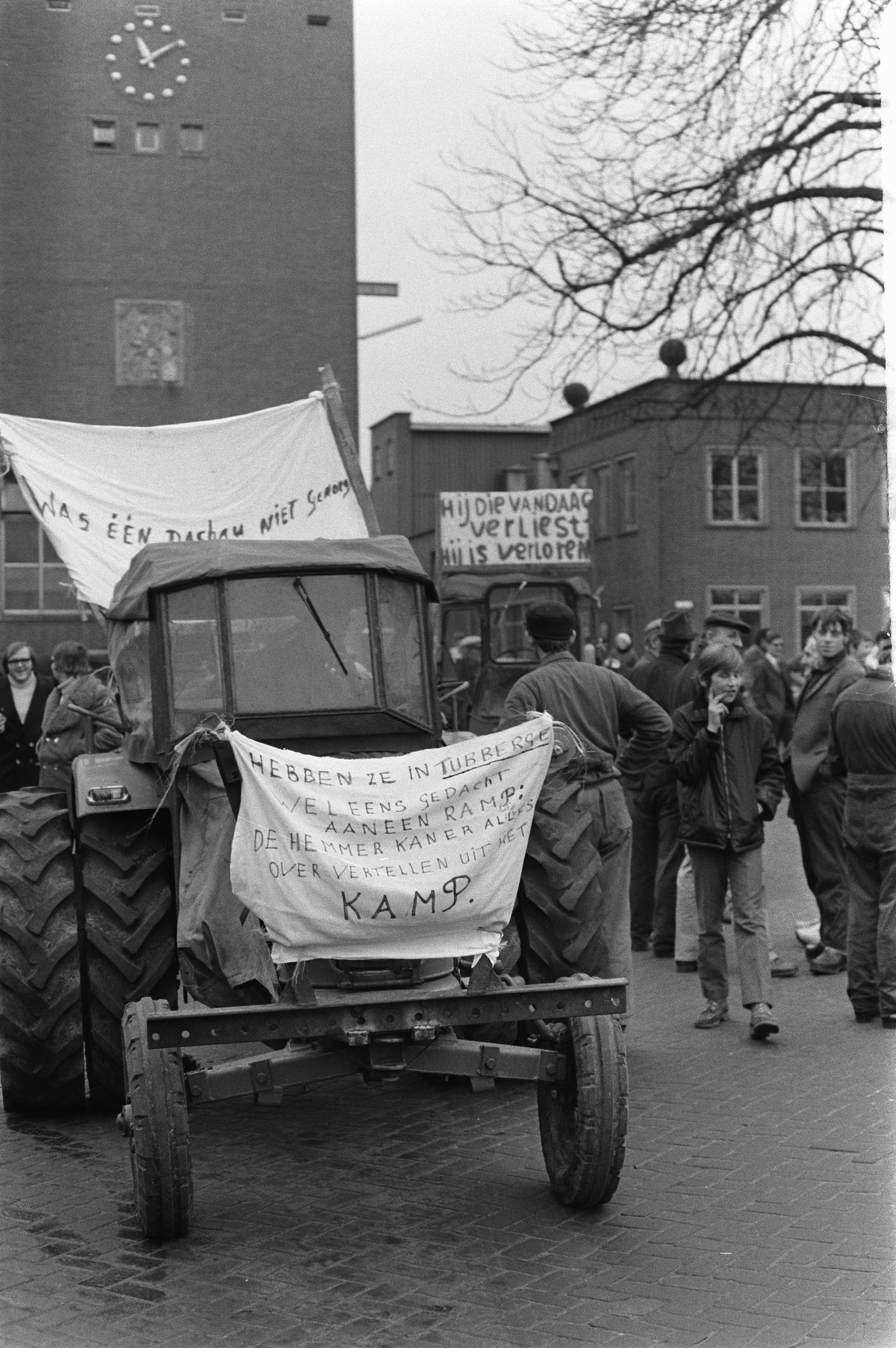
Wasn't one Dachau enough? Have they ever considered a disaster in Tubbergen: De Hemmer can tell them all about it from the camp.

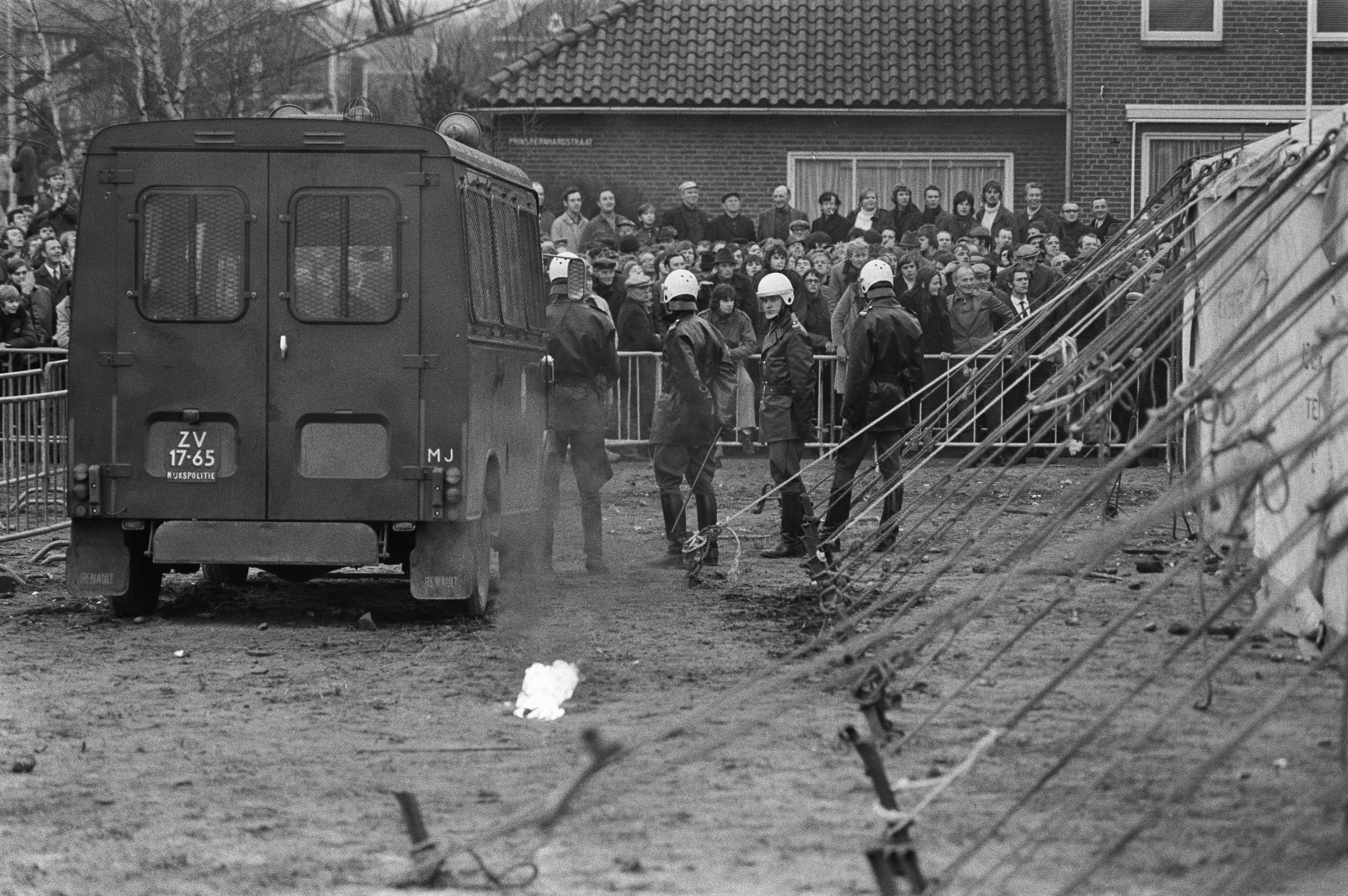
Riot police officers and protesters outside the polling place.

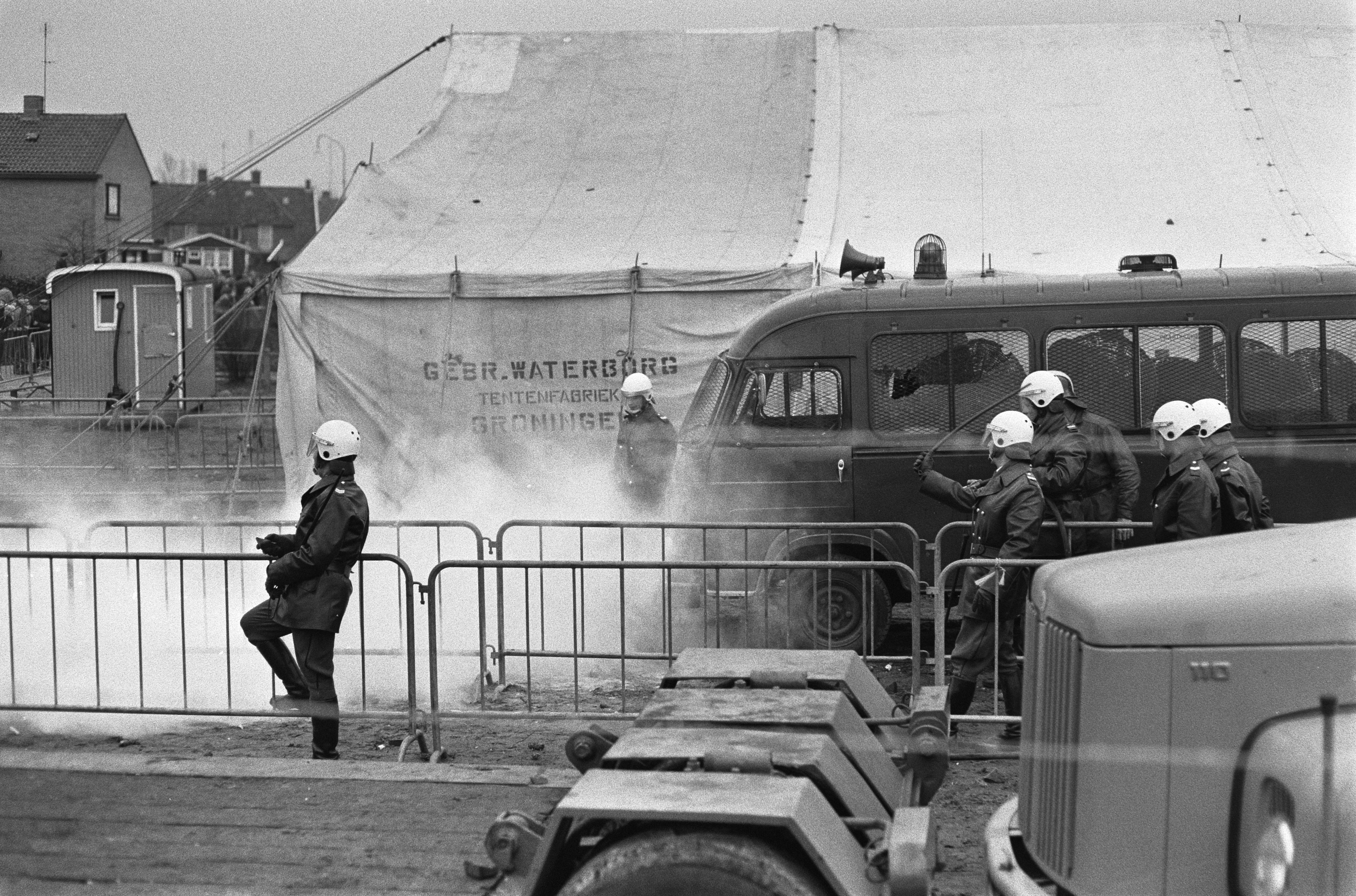
Riot police officers and an armored van outside the polling place.

== See also ==
- 1963 Dutch farmers' revolt
- 1989–1990 Dutch farmers' protests
- Dutch farmers' protests
