= Hollandscheveld =

- Village
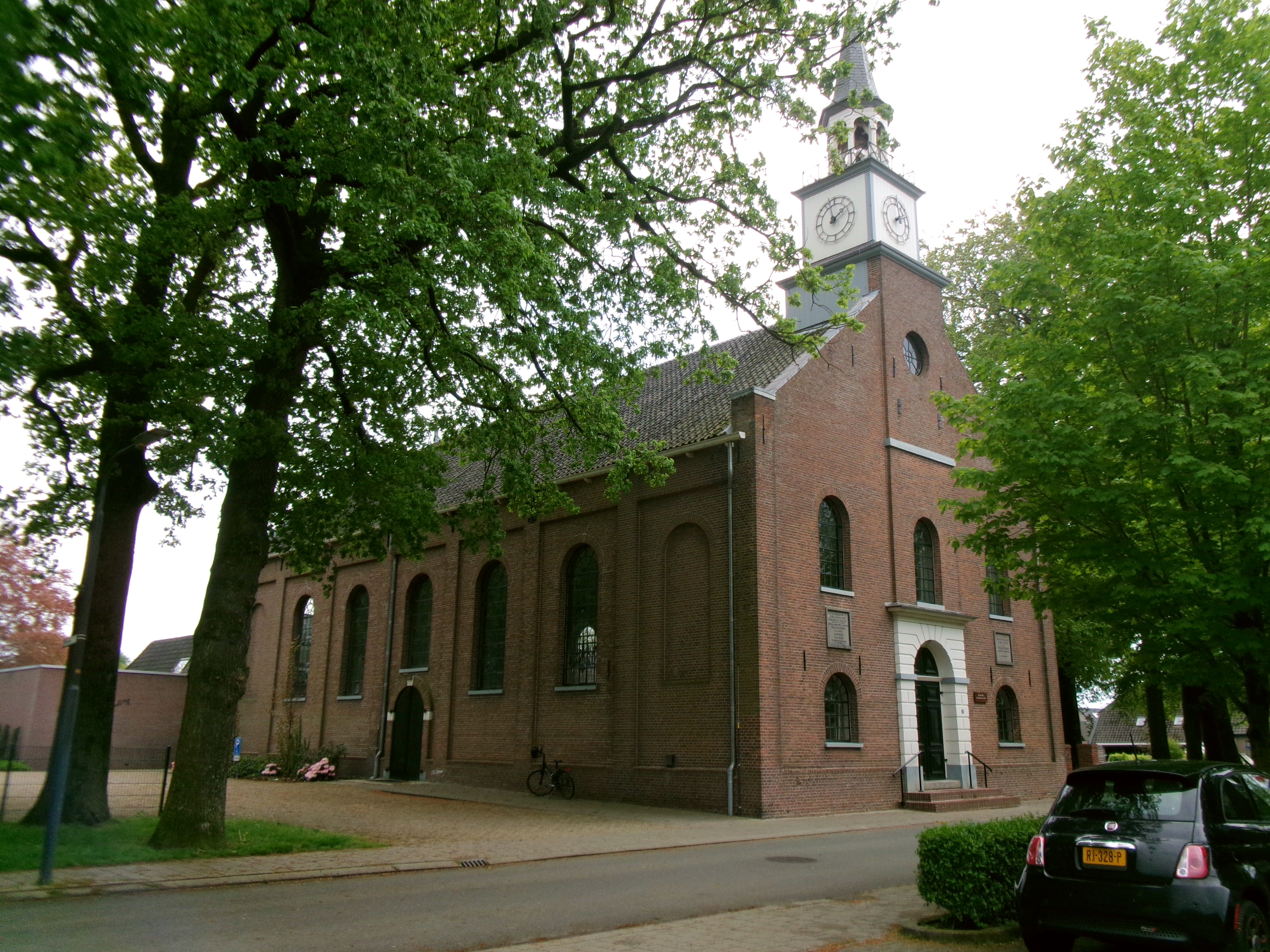
- Church in Hollandscheveld

- Flag Coat of arms

- Location in province of Drenthe in the Netherlands Hollandscheveld (Netherlands)
- Coordinates: 52.6799°N 6.5776°E
- Country: Netherlands
- Province: Drenthe
- Municipality: Hoogeveen

Area
  - Total: 21.84 km^{2} (8.43 sq mi)
- Elevation: 13 m (43 ft)

Population (2021)
  - Total: 4,560
  - Density: 209/km^{2} (541/sq mi)
- Time zone: UTC+1 (CET)
  - Summer (DST): UTC+2 (CEST)
- Postal code: 7913
- Dialing code: 0528

Hollandscheveld (Dutch pronunciation: [ˈɦɔlɑntsəˌvɛlt]) is a village in the municipality of Hoogeveen, the Netherlands. It was founded in the 17th century after the Hollandsche Compagnie (Company from Holland) bought the land to harvest its peat. It was initially named Hollandsche Veld (Field of the Hollandsche Compagnie) which was later combined into just Hollandscheveld.

During the Second World War, three notorious war criminals lived in Hollandscheveld: Auke Pattist, Dirk Hoogendam and Martinus Johannes van Oort. These men tortured and arrested resistance warriors and Jews in a local school. Dirk Hoogendam was sentenced to death after the war, but managed to escape to Germany where he died in 2003.

Known resistance heroes Marinus and Johannes Post were born in Hollandscheveld. They were both executed by the Germans in 1944.

Hollandscheveld became the focus of national attention in 1963 during the Boerenopstand (Farmer's uprising). Thousands of so-called Free Farmers descended on Hollandscheveld when three families were removed from their farms after refusing to pay a levy to the Landbouwschap. After several days of fighting between farmers and armed police, one of the homesteads was burned to the ground. The leader of the uprising was Hendrik Koekoek who was nicknamed Boer Koekoek (Farmer Koekoek). His political party, Boerenpartij (The Farmers Party), gained power and influence as a result of the incident.

== Notable people ==
- Piet Kleine (born 1951), speed skater gold medallist from the 1976 Olympics
- Hendrik Koekoek (1912–1987), politician

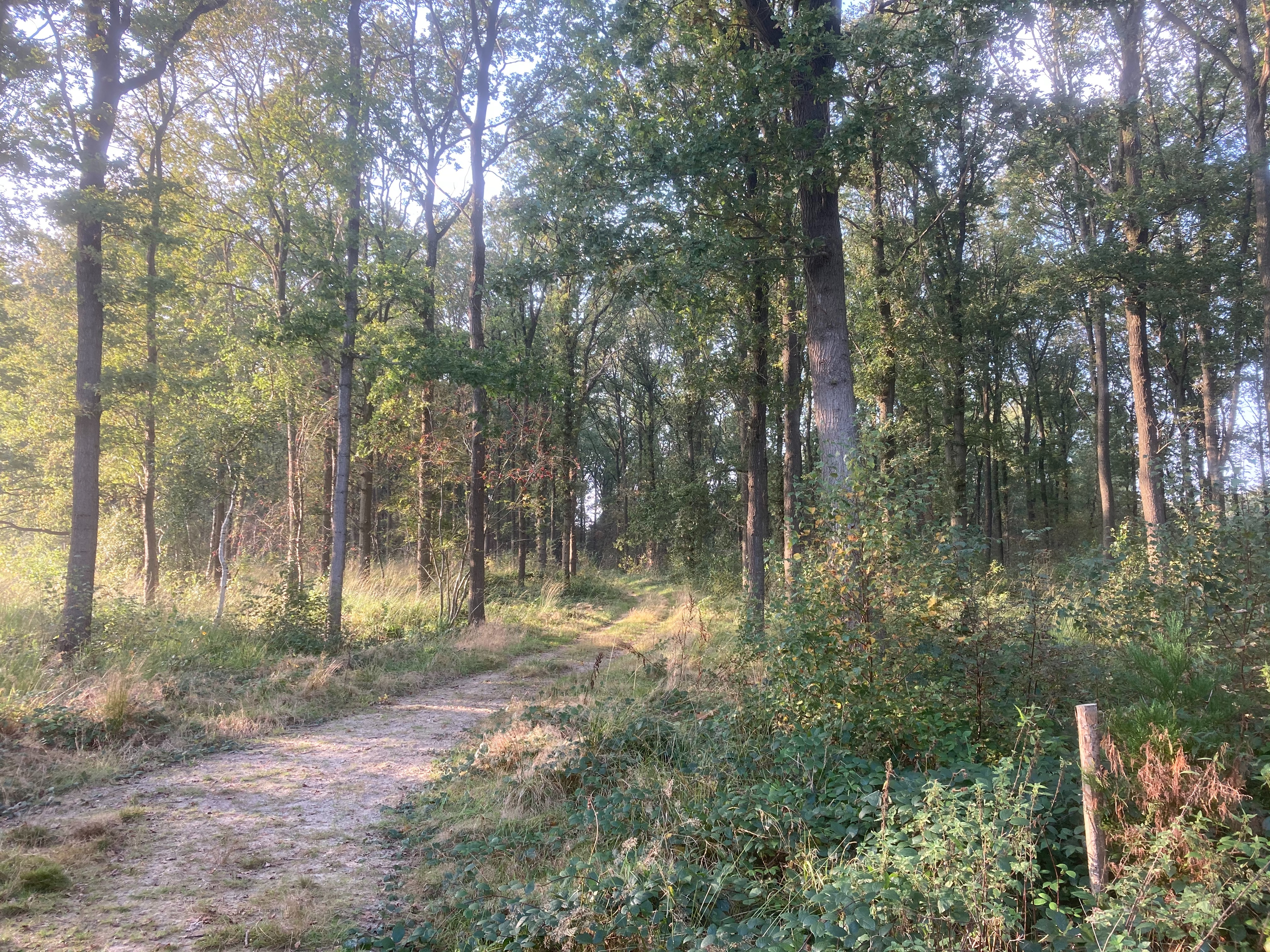
Nature near Hollandscheveld
