= 1989–1990 Dutch farmers' protests =

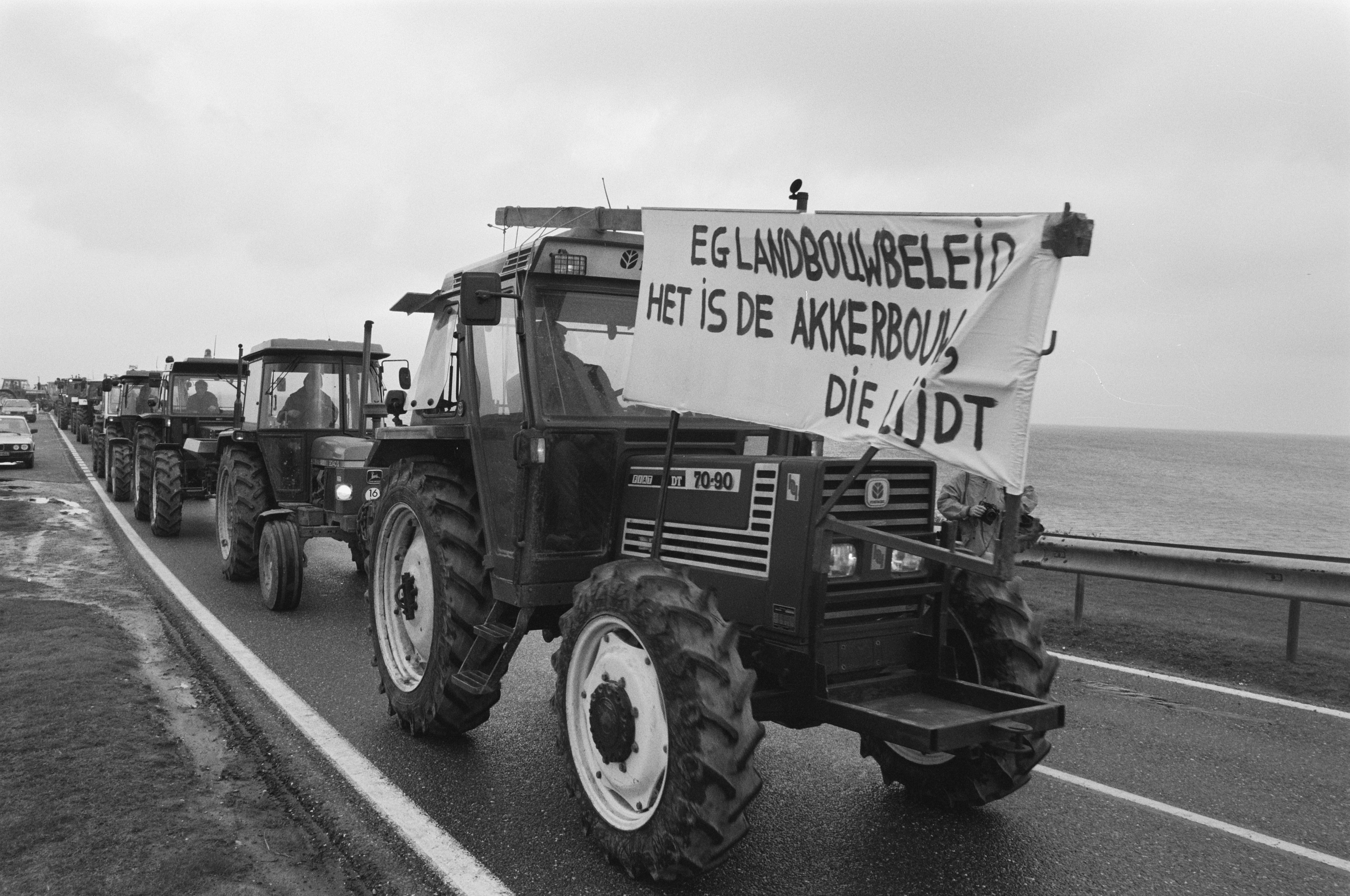
Tractors with banners cross the Afsluitdijk, 27 February 1989.

The 1989–1990 Dutch farmers' protests (Dutch: Akkerbouwersprotest), for want of an unambiguous official name also referred to as the Farmers' Revolt (Dutch: Boerenopstand), was a series of protests by Dutch farmers of arable land. Starting locally in February–March 1989 and culminating in nationwide demonstrations in February–March 1990, the protests were a response to changes in government agricultural policy beginning in the mid-1980s.

== Background ==
Under the agriculture ministership of Sicco Mansholt, the price that arable farmers in the Netherlands received for cereal grain (in particular wheat) was kept artificially high. Under Gerrit Braks, who preferred to invest in pig farming, this standard was abandoned. Partly due to the import of cheap grain from abroad, the high grain price became unsustainable. In addition, the European Union had to raise billions annually to buy up surpluses. To be able to compete on the world market and maintain a position of competitiveness, western European agriculture had to shift its focus from maximum yield towards market conformity. As such, from 1984 measures were taken from Brussels to limit production, first for the dairy sector and then also for arable farming. The grain growers, who saw their income fall drastically (from 50 cents to less than 40 cents per kilogram of wheat) protested against this. At the end of February 1989, arable farmers in the province of Friesland formed large tractor convoys in protest against government policy, and at the beginning of March 1989 arable farmers from the provinces of South Holland and Zeeland, among others, barricaded the building of the Ministry of Agriculture in The Hague. Thousands of farmers had gathered and hundreds of tractors caused traffic jams and blockades. The farmers demanded an end to the price cuts, a national incentive plan for arable farming, and reasonable environmental measures.

== 1990 events ==
After a debate in the House of Representatives about the government budget, in which a majority expressed support for the agricultural plans of Minister Braks, a number of farmers from Zeeland called on fellow grain growers to take their tractors to The Hague to protest in support of a motion by D66 MP Pieter ter Veer. On 19 February, a tractor column reached the center of The Hague, but was met by police. After a procession with banners, they returned home the next day. In the night of 19 to 20 February, however, a low-loader with three tractors from Groningen managed to arrive unhindered at the Binnenhof, which was then barricaded by the owners of the vehicles. Soon, more farmers from Groningen and Flevoland appeared on the scene with their tractors. That same day, a farmers' delegation occupied the office of the Landbouwschap, which was transformed into an action center. Klaas Jan de Waard from Kommerzijl became the spokesperson for the farmers.

When a conversation with Minister Braks on 21 February lead nowhere, the protest spread. All over the northern Netherlands farmers took to the road in their tractors, as a result of which the highways to Groningen, Leeuwarden, Assen and the Flevopolders were blocked by a total of c. 5,000 farmers. The protests also extended to Germany and Belgium. On 23 February, the building of the Rijksbelastingdienst in Apeldoorn was barricaded. On 26 February, the customs offices in Veendam and Hoogezand and the landfill in Wijster followed. On 1 March, Wolvega railway station and the Informatiseringsbank in Groningen were barricaded. On 7 March, farmers blocked access to the airports of Eelde and Lelystad, as well as the waste treatment plant Rijnmond in Rotterdam and the Rabobank head offices in Utrecht. The farmers' next target was Schiphol Airport, but this was where the government drew the line: if the farmers occupied Schiphol, the Dutch army would be deployed (regular and riot police were unable to halt the large agricultural machinery; the farmers would only lose out against tanks and armored cars). When two tractor convoys—one from beyond the Afsluitdijk and one from the Veluwe—headed towards Schiphol Airport, the commander of the army barracks at 't Harde was warned to get ready to move out. Schiphol was declared 'off-limits'.

== Outcome ==
To break the deadlock and prevent escalation, Mansholt intervened. He sent a fax to the farmers' action center and one to Prime Minister Ruud Lubbers: a series of graphs and tables showing that only a wheat price increase in combination with production reduction would offer a solution. A truce was then concluded: the farmers would withdraw, while an arbitration committee was to be set up to look for a satisfactory solution. Thanks in part to mediation by a committee of three "wise men"—former minister Jan de Koning of the CDA, the Queen's commissioner of Drenthe Wim Meijer of the Labour Party, and the Queen's commissioner of Friesland Hans Wiegel of the VVD—Minister Braks appeared willing to make some concessions. These still proved too little to the liking of the arable farmers, so they decided to continue with 'friendly' protest actions. In the end, the path to market-compatible Dutch agriculture would gradually resume, which would result in varying advantages and disadvantages for the farmers. For instance, the number of bankruptcies (partly as a result of low prices) increased even further in some years, but the wheat price was also higher than ever around the turn of the millennium.

== See also ==
- 1963 Dutch farmers' revolt – rebellion by "Free Farmers" against the Landbouwschap over the eviction of three farmer families in Hollandscheveld, Drenthe
- 1971 Dutch farmers' revolt – farmers' rebellion against municipal authorities over an intended land consolidation in Tubbergen, Overijssel
- Dutch farmers' protests – ongoing Dutch livestock farmers' protests against environmental legislation and in favor of higher prices for agricultural produce
