= Polite populism =

Political philosophy

Polite populism is a political phrase coined by Marcus Mietzner. It was also stated in The Harvard Gazette, and in an opinion article by Filipino political analyst Richard Heydarian.

== Term ==
By early 2014, Marcus Mietzner used that term to Joko Widodo when he was the president.

In 2015, it was observed by The Harvard Gazette when then-Maryland Governor Martin O’Malley gave a speech with a populist theme, but also campaigning for "common-sense choices".

Heydarian also used the term on Manila Mayor Isko Moreno, as he considered Moreno as a populist. Yet he saw him as different to President Rodrigo Duterte, Moreno recounted his childhood and early life in poverty and did not attack opponents like Duterte.
