= Hélio Jaguaribe =

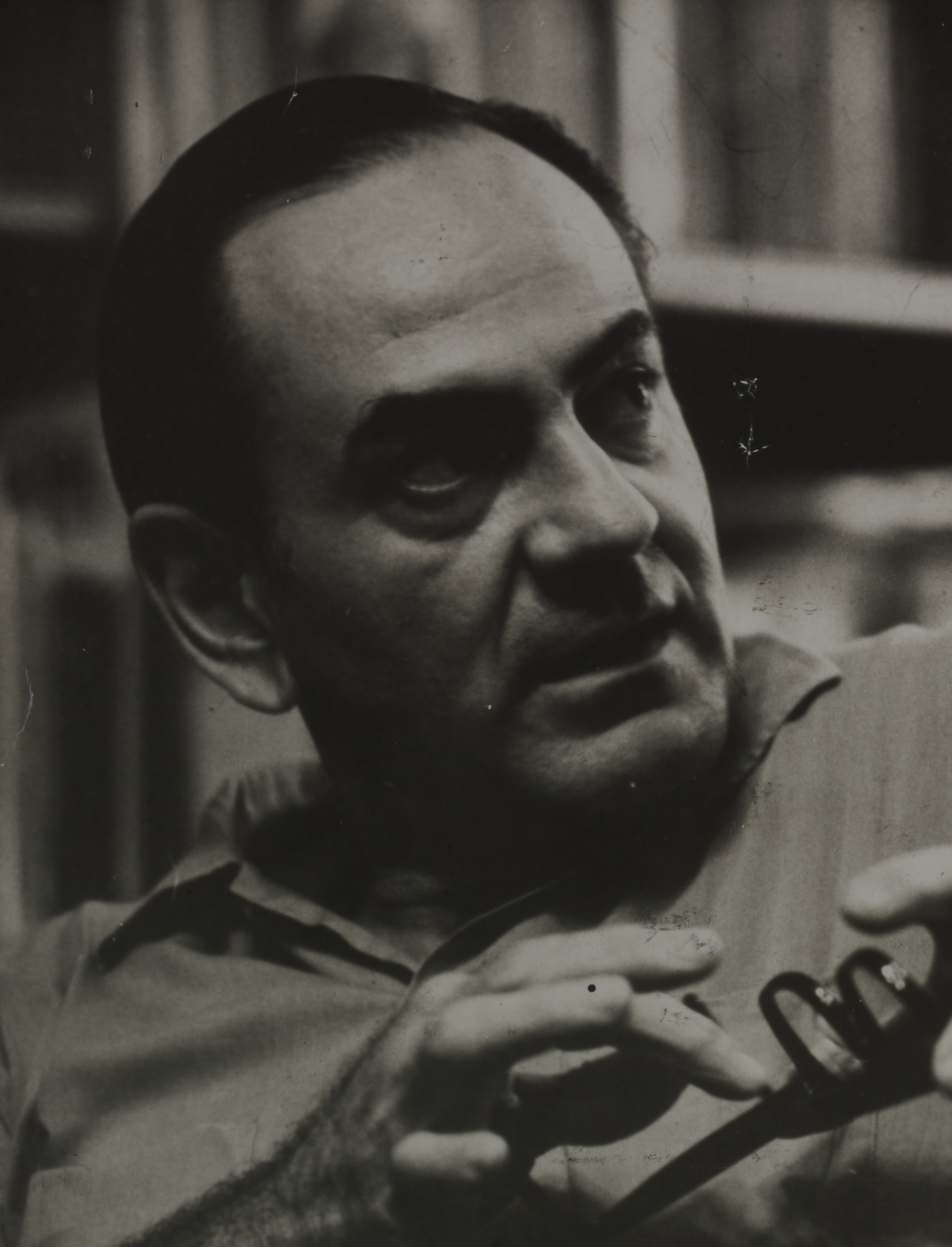
c. 1970

Helio Jaguaribe de Mattos (April 23, 1923 – September 9, 2018) was a Brazilian lawyer, sociologist, and political scientist.

He was born in Rio de Janeiro, the son of eminent geographer Francisco Jaguaribe de Mattos, and Francelina Santos Jaguaribe de Mattos. He studied law at the Pontifical Catholic University of Rio de Janeiro, graduating in 1946. As an academic, he specialized in the sociopolitical development of Brazil and Latin America. He taught at Harvard, Stanford, MIT, and El Colegio de Méjico, and served as director of the Institute of Political and Social Studies of the Candido Mendes University. He also held a chair at the University Institute in Rio de Janeiro. He was a member of the Club of Rome. In 2005, he was elected to be the ninth occupant of Chair No. 11 at the Brazilian Academy of Letters in succession to Celso Furtado. He was received into the Academy on July 22, 2005 by academician Candido Mendes de Almeida.
