= Farmers' Party (Netherlands) =

Farmers' Party Boerenpartij
- Abbreviation: BP
- Leader: Hendrik Koekoek
- Founded: 1958/1959
- Dissolved: 1981
- Merged into: Right Wing People's Party
- Ideology: Agrarianism; Conservative liberalism Dutch nationalism Social conservatism Right-wing populism
- Political position: Right-wing

The Farmers' Party (Dutch: Boerenpartij, BP) was a Dutch agrarian political party, with a strong conservative outlook and a populist appeal. The BP was the first anti-establishment party elected into the Dutch House of Representatives after the Second World War.

The BP was founded by Hendrik Koekoek. The party gained prominence in several Gelderland municipalities under the "Free Farmers" lists. The BP officially applied to participate in the 1959 elections, focusing on issues such as government intervention in farming and promoting political and economic freedom. In the 1963 elections, the BP won three seats in the House of Representatives, followed by two seats in the Senate in 1966. However, internal struggles and leadership issues led to the party's decline. In the 1981 elections, the BP was renamed the Right-wing People's Party but failed to win a seat. The BP drew support from farmers and small business owners, both rural and urban. Comparisons can be made to Eastern European farmers' parties and the French party led by Pierre Poujade.

== History ==
=== Foundation ===
The precise foundation date of the BP is not known. In 1958, in several Gelderland municipalities "Free Farmers" lists contested in municipal elections. In 1959 the Farmers' Party officially applied at the Kiesraad to participate in the 1959 elections, although the party was unable to win a seat. The founder of the party was Hendrik Koekoek, the chair and founder of the Association for Freedom for Agricultural Business, also known as the "Free Farmers". The organization resisted increasing government intervention and the institutionalization of farming. These also became important issues for the Farmers' Party.

=== 1963–1981 ===
1972 election poster showing Koekoek

In the elections of 1963, the Farmers' Party won three seats in the House of Representatives. The party had gained considerable attention through the so-called Revolt of the Braves, when police forcibly evicted three farmer families for a principled refusal to pay taxes. Koekoek, the party's leader, came from the same region and acted as spokesperson for these farmers. With its populist appeal the party had been able to get the support from farmers and non-farmers, even from urban areas. He headed the party's list and became the chairperson of the parliamentary party. In 1966 the party won two seats in the Senate.

In parliament, the Boerenpartij was troubled by internal struggles and splits. In 1966 it was revealed that one of the party's senators, Adams, had a national socialist background, and had been a member of the National Socialist Movement and the SS. Koekoek protected Adams against the allegations. In reaction to that Voogd, one of the party's MPs, left the party. Also a group of members from the party founded their own party, Emergency Council (Noodraad).

Both Emergency Council and Farmers' Party participated in the 1967 elections, as did Voogd with his own list. Only the Farmers' party managed to secure representation with a total of seven seats, whilst both the Emergency Council and the List-Voogd ended up with no seats. In the next years Koekoek was (again) unable to keep his parliamentary party together. His authoritarian leadership caused four of the seven MPs to leave the party and to organize their own party, Right Allegiance (Binding Rechts). They were led by Harmsen, one of the founders of the Farmers' Party. One of these four MPs left his new party soon to work as an independent. In 1971 one of Koekoek's MPs also left his party, leaving only two MPs.

In the 1971 elections, Koekoek obtained only one seat, and Right Allegiance none. In the 1972 elections, the party won two additional seats. In the 1977 elections the party lost those two seats again, leaving only Koekoek.

=== Dissolution ===
Before the elections of 1981, the BP was renamed to Right-wing People's Party (Dutch: Rechtse Volkspartij, RVP) but they were unable to win a seat. In the municipality of Heerde, a remnant of the party as Gemeentebelang Boerenpartij Heerde continues to have representation on the municipal council.

== Ideology ==
The party's main issue was the increasing government interference in, and the institutionalization of, farming. Yet it was more than single issue agrarian interest party. It saw itself as a conservative party which championed political and economic freedom in general, on basis of national and Christian values. It had a strong populist, anti-establishment appeal. Although some members had been active with fascist or national socialist organizations before 1945, the party rejected racism and fascism. Piero Ignazi has defined its ideology as "a curious mixture of authoritarianism and individualism, anti-tax protest, and anti-parliamentarism, somewhat reminiscent of French Poujadism". However he stressed that the party was not part of the extreme right.

The party had a strong nationalist message: it was in favour of the Dutch monarchy, opposed European integration, wanted a strong defense, and believed that law and order should be maintained.

On economic matters, the party was very right-wing. It wanted to protect private property and encourage private initiative. It sought to reduce government influence on the economy and taxation. It felt that the welfare state should be reduced to a minimum, agricultural subsidies should be cut, and that the agricultural sector would be able to support itself if the government interfered less.

== Organisation ==
=== Leadership ===
This table shows the BP's results in elections to the House of Representatives and Senate, as well as the party's political leadership: the fractievoorzitter is the chair of the parliamentary party and the lijsttrekker is the party's top candidate in the general election, and these posts are normally taken by the party's leader.

Year	HoR	S	Lijsttrekker	Fractievoorzitter
1963	3	0	Hendrik Koekoek	Hendrik Koekoek
1964	3	0	no elections	Hendrik Koekoek
1965	3	0	no elections	Hendrik Koekoek
1966	3	2	no elections	Hendrik Koekoek
1967	7	2	Hendrik Koekoek	Hendrik Koekoek
1968	3	2	no elections	Hendrik Koekoek
1969	3	3	no elections	Hendrik Koekoek
1970	3	3	no elections	Hendrik Koekoek
1971	1	0	Hendrik Koekoek	Hendrik Koekoek
1972	3	0	Hendrik Koekoek	Hendrik Koekoek
1973	3	0	no elections	Hendrik Koekoek
1974	3	1	no elections	Hendrik Koekoek
1975	3	1	no elections	Hendrik Koekoek
1976	3	1	no elections	Hendrik Koekoek
1977	1	1	Hendrik Koekoek	Hendrik Koekoek
1978	1	1	no elections	Hendrik Koekoek
1979	1	1	no elections	Hendrik Koekoek
1980	1	1	no elections	Hendrik Koekoek

=== Municipal and provincial government ===
The party has been able to win several seats in provincial legislatures and in municipal councils. In several rural municipalities such as Apeldoorn the party was rather strong - Harmsen, one of the party's MPs, was a longtime alderman there. Especially in the period 1965–1970, the party also managed to win municipal council seats in cities such as Amsterdam, where they scored 9.4% (or 4 of 45 seats) in 1966.

== Electorate ==
The party drew most of its support from farmers and small business owners in rural areas. With its populist appeal the party had also been able to get support from small business owners in urban areas. In the 1963 elections the party polled 6,000 votes from Amsterdam.

== International comparison ==
As a conservative farmers' party, the Farmers' Party is similar to Eastern European farmers' parties, such as the Polish Peasant Party. The best comparison however can be made with the party of Pierre Poujade which was successful in the 1956 elections, but faded away afterwards. Like Poujade's party the Farmers' Party had a strong populist message which appealed to both farmers and small business.

== See also ==
- Peasants' League
- 1963 Dutch farmers' revolt
- Farmer-Citizen Movement
