= Polite (magazine) =

- Editor: Justin Peters
- Categories: Humor magazine
- Frequency: semi-regular
- Publisher: The Cappadocian Society
- Founded: 2005
- Country: United States
- Language: English
- Website: www.politemag.com

Polite is a semi-regular general interest and humor magazine published in the United States. Its tagline is "Generally interesting."

== History ==
The magazine was founded as a quarterly in August 2005 by college friends Justin Peters and Toby Warner. It switched to a twice-yearly format in January 2007 upon publication of its second issue.

The magazine publishes reportage, commentary, criticism, and satire, and specializes in articles about serious (though unconventional) topics as well as (possibly) fictional profiles and trend pieces.

== Contributors ==
Notable contributors have included Madison Smartt Bell, Peter Rock, Phil Campbell, Steve Almond, Byron Case, Emily Pecora, Bryce Wissel, and Davy Rothbart.

== Awards ==
In 2007, Polite was nominated in the Utne Reader's Independent Press Awards competition as one of the Best New Magazines of 2007.
