= Publiekrechtelijke Bedrijfsorganisatie =

Publiekrechtelijke Bedrijfsorganisatie (in English Sectoral organisation under public law, abbreviated PBO) is a Dutch form of government. PBOs are self-regulatory organizations for specific economic sectors.

These organizations are called Product- en Bedrijfschappen (Product and Company Boards). The productschap for dairy can propose binding regulation for all companies in the dairy sector and set quality standards and quotas for dairy-producing organisations. These Product- en Bedrijfschappen are formed by representatives of trade unions and employers' organizations in the sector. This is part of the corporatist social market economy of the Netherlands. At the top of all PBOs stands the Social Economic Council. It was instituted in the 1950s.
