= Hendrik Koekoek =

Dutch politician (1912–1987)

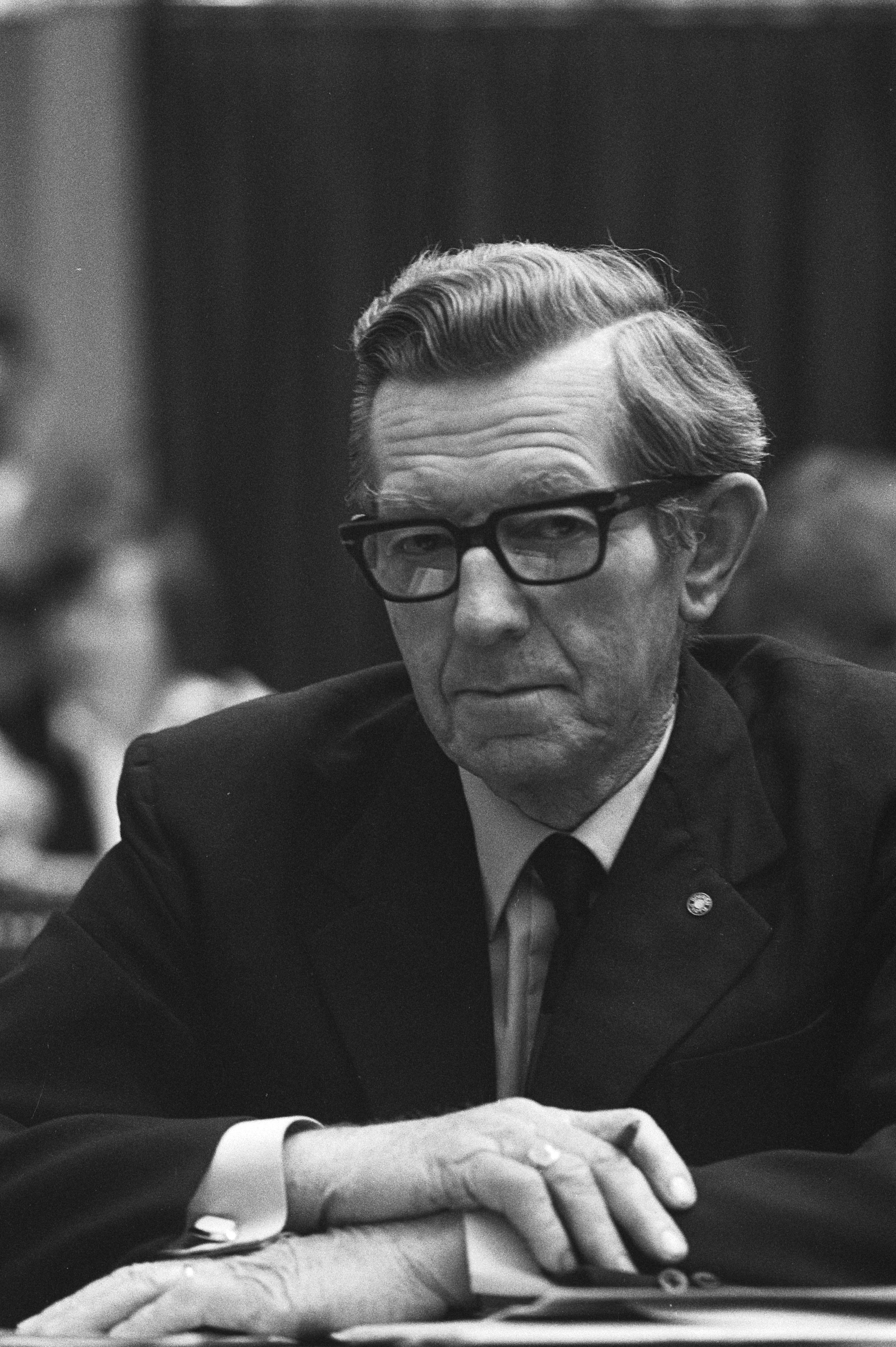
- Koekoek in 1980

Parliamentary leader in the House of Representatives
- In office 5 June 1963 – 10 June 1981
- Preceded by: Office established
- Succeeded by: Office discontinued
- Parliamentary group: Farmers' Party

Member of the House of Representatives
- In office 5 June 1963 – 10 June 1981
- Parliamentary group: Farmers' Party

Leader of the Farmers' Party
- In office 10 December 1958 – 31 December 1982
- Preceded by: Office established
- Succeeded by: Office discontinued

Chairman of the Farmers' Party
- In office 10 December 1958 – 31 December 1982
- Preceded by: Office established
- Succeeded by: Office discontinued

Personal details
- Born: Hendrik Koekoek; 22 May 1912 Hollandscheveld, Netherlands
- Died: 8 February 1987 (aged 74) Bennekom, Netherlands
- Party: Farmers' Party (1958–1982)
- Other political affiliations: Christian Historical Union (until 1956)
- Spouse: Doortje van Zetten (m. 1942)
- Relatives: Jan de Groote (brother-in-law)
- Occupation: Politician · Farmer · Farmworker · Activist

Military service
- Allegiance: Netherlands
- Branch/service: Royal Netherlands Army
- Years of service: 1930–1932 (Conscription); 1932–1939 (Reserve); 1939–1940 (Conscription)
- Rank: Private
- Battles/wars: World War II; Battle of the Netherlands

Hendrik Koekoek (22 May 1912 – 8 February 1987) was a Dutch farmer, politician, and founder of the defunct Farmers' Party (Boerenpartij; BP).

Koekoek was the leader and party chair of the BP from 1958 until 1981. He served as the party's Parliamentary leader in the House of Representatives from 5 June 1963 until 10 June 1981. He was also a member of the States-Provincial of Gelderland between 6 June 1962 and 5 June 1963. Although he was widely known, he was never a major force in the Dutch political landscape.
