= Cabecita negra =

Cabecita negra is a term used in Argentina to derogatorily refer to a segment of the population associated with dark-skinned people with Indigenous features or mixed race people (mestizos) belonging to the working class. It was generally used in the mid-20th century by the middle and upper classes of the Buenos Aires Metropolitan Region and, to a lesser extent, by the same social sectors in other important urban centers in the Pampas region, such as Rosario or La Plata.

The term is embedded in a complex series of conflictual relationships between the people of Buenos Aires and the Buenos Aires metropolitan region with provincial residents from the north, European immigrants with internal migrants from rural areas in the north of the country or from neighboring countries, the upper and middle classes with the lower classes, and anti-Peronists with Peronists.

The term originated in the city of Buenos Aires in the 1940s, when a large internal migration began, mainly from rural areas of the northern provinces, to Buenos Aires and other large urban centers, seeking labor in the new factories being created as a result of a broad industrialization process. It was used to describe these migrants with a pejorative meaning. In 1961, the Argentine author Germán Rozenmacher wrote a short story entitled precisely Cabecita negra.
