= Den Uyl shadow cabinet =

The Den Uyl shadow cabinet was a shadow cabinet formed by the Labour Party (PvdA), Democrats 66 (D'66) and the Political Party of Radicals (PPR) in preparation for the upcoming election of 1971 on 28 April 1971. The left-wing collaboration was a first time a shadow cabinet was formed in Dutch politics. It was based on the shadow cabinet in the Westminster system of government. Labour Party Member of the House of Representatives Ed van Thijn promised the idea as a basis for a proposed coalition after the election. After the election of 1971 and the formation of the First Biesheuvel cabinet, the shadow cabinet was disbanded 2 July 1971. One year later after the election of 1972 the basis of the shadow cabinet was used as a template for the formation of the Den Uyl cabinet.

== Composition ==
=== Ministers ===
Portrait	Name	Shadow position	Position in 1971	Position in the Den Uyl cabinet after the 1972 election	Party
Joop den Uyl	Joop den Uyl (1919–1987)	Prime Minister; Minister of General Affairs	Parliamentary leader in the House of Representatives	Prime Minister; Minister of General Affairs	Labour Party
Hans van Mierlo	Hans van Mierlo (1931–2010)	Deputy Prime Minister; Minister for Constitutional Affairs (within Interior)	Parliamentary leader in the House of Representatives	None	Democrats 66
Jacques Aarden	Jacques Aarden (1914–1997)	Deputy Prime Minister; Minister of the Interior	Parliamentary leader in the House of Representatives	None	Political Party of Radicals
Max van der Stoel	Max van der Stoel (1924–2011)	Minister of Foreign Affairs	Member of the House of Representatives	Minister of Foreign Affairs	Labour Party
Rob van den Bergh	Rob van den Bergh (1913–1997)	Minister of Finance	Member of the House of Representatives	None	Labour Party
Anneke Goudsmit	Anneke Goudsmit (born 1933)	Minister of Justice	Member of the House of Representatives	None	Democrats 66
Cees de Galan	Dr. Cees de Galan (1932–1987)	Minister of Economic Affairs	Economist	None	Labour Party
Jaap Burger	Jaap Burger (1904–1986)	Minister of Defence	Member of the Council of State	None	Labour Party
Wiebe Draijer	Dr. Wiebe Draijer (1924–2007)	Minister of Health and Environment	Professor at the University of Twente	None	Democrats 66
Theo van Lier	Theo van Lier (1916–1992)	Minister of Social Affairs	Member of the House of Representatives	None	Labour Party
Anne Vondeling	Dr. Anne Vondeling (1916–1979)	Minister of Education and Sciences	Member of the House of Representatives	None	Labour Party
Ed van Thijn	Ed van Thijn (1934–2021)	Minister of Transport and Water Management	Member of the House of Representatives	None	Labour Party
Henk Vredeling	Henk Vredeling (1924–2007)	Minister of Agriculture and Fisheries	Member of the House of Representatives	Minister of Defence	Labour Party
Hans van den Doel	Hans van den Doel (1937–2012)	Minister of Housing and Spatial Planning	Member of the House of Representatives	None	Labour Party
Max Rood	Dr. Max Rood (1927–2001)	Minister of Culture, Recreation and Social Work	Professor at the Leiden University	None	Democrats 66
Bas de Gaay Fortman	Dr. Bas de Gaay Fortman (born 1937)	Minister for Development Cooperation (within Foreign Affairs)	Member of the House of Representatives	None	Political Party of Radicals

=== State Secretaries ===
Portrait	Name	Shadow position and portfolio	Position in 1971	Position in the Den Uyl cabinet after the election of 1972	Party
Laurens Jan Brinkhorst	Laurens Jan Brinkhorst (born 1937)	State Secretary of Foreign Affairs • European affairs • NATO affairs • Benelux affairs	Professor at the University of Groningen	State Secretary of Foreign Affairs	Democrats 66
Irene Vorrink	Irene Vorrink (1918–1996)	State Secretary of Social Affairs • Social security • Occupational safety	Member of the Senate	Minister of Health and Environment	Labour Party
Jaap van der Doef	Jaap van der Doef (1934–2025)	State Secretary of Social Affairs • Social security • Occupational safety	Trade union leader	None	Labour Party
Tineke Schilthuis	Tineke Schilthuis (1921–2013)	State Secretary of Transport and Water Management • Transport infrastructure • Water infrastructure • Public transport	Member of the House of Representatives	None	Labour Party
Marcel van Dam	Marcel van Dam (born 1938)	State Secretary of Culture, Recreation and Social Work • Social services • Welfare	Ombudsman	State Secretary for Housing and Spatial Planning	Labour Party
