= Peter Lankhorst =

Dutch politician (born 1947)

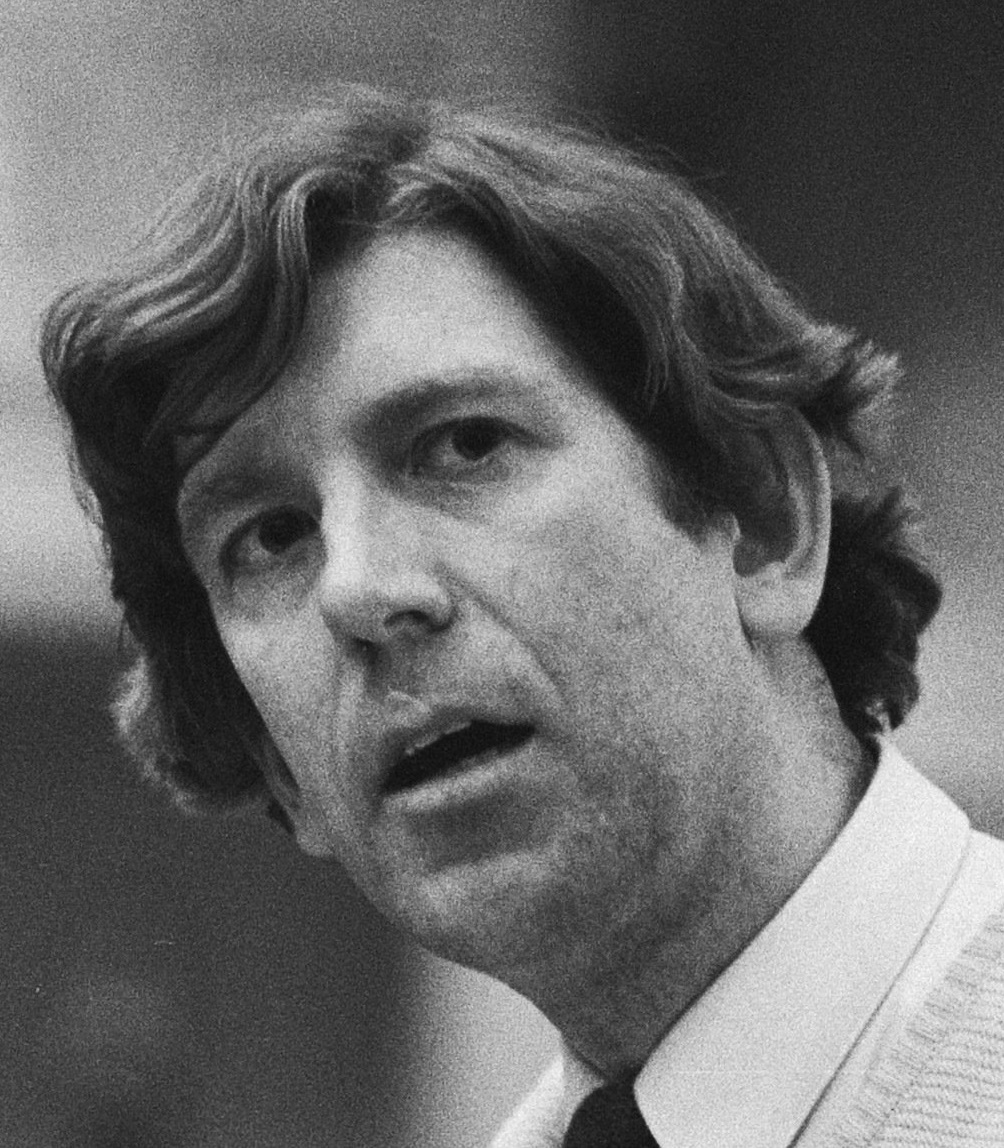
- Peter Lankhorst in 1984

Parliamentary leader in the House of Representatives
- In office 20 April 1993 – 4 May 1994
- Preceded by: Ria Beckers
- Succeeded by: Paul Rosenmöller
- Parliamentary group: GreenLeft

Leader of GreenLeft
- In office 20 April 1993 – 22 February 1994
- Preceded by: Ria Beckers
- Succeeded by: Ina Brouwer

Member of the House of Representatives
- In office 10 June 1981 – 17 May 1994
- Parliamentary group: GreenLeft (1989–1994); Political Party of Radicals (1981–1989)

Personal details
- Born: Petrus Antonius Lankhorst; 1 January 1947 (age 79) Zwolle, Netherlands
- Party: GreenLeft (from 1989)
- Other political affiliations: Political Party of Radicals (1972–1989)
- Education: University of Amsterdam (Bachelor of Social Science, Master of Social Science)
- Occupation: Politician · Political consultant · Nonprofit director · Author · Columnist

Petrus Antonius "Peter" Lankhorst (born 1 January 1947) is a retired Dutch politician of the GreenLeft (GL) party and political consultant.

Lankhorst served as a Member of the House of Representatives from 10 June 1981 until 17 May 1994, first as a member of the Political Party of Radicals (PPR) and from 1990 as a member of GreenLeft. He became the Parliamentary leader of GreenLeft in the House of Representatives and the Leader of GreenLeft on 21 April 1993 after the resignation of Ria Beckers.

== Biography ==
=== Early life ===
Petrus Antonius Lankhorst was born on 1 January 1947 in Zwolle in the Netherlands Province of Overijssel in a Roman Catholic family. He attended a Protestant-Christian special schools in Meppel and Deventer, and the Roman Catholic Geert Groote College in Deventer. He started to attend Gymnasium (school) but later went to the HBS, graduating in 1966. He studied political science at the University of Amsterdam, graduating in 1974.

=== Politics ===
Lankhorst joined the Political Party of Radicals and entered the Amsterdam city council. He was originally candidate-alderman for education, but Roel van Duijn took this position for the PPR. Lankhorst left the council in 1980. A month later he became civil servant for the municipal department for Youth and Education. After the 1981 election he became MP for the PPR. He was spokesperson on housing, education, Transport, Public Works and Water Management and youth welfare. He was one of the first MPs to be openly homosexual during his term in parliament.

After the 1982 election his former friend Hans Janmaat became MP for the right-wing Centre Party. Lankhorst tried to avoid Janmaat as far as possible. In 1989 Lankhorst initiated a law to oblige high schools to promulgate a statute which lays down the rights of students. In 1993 it was adopted.

In 1991 the PPR merged with the communist Communist Party of the Netherlands, the left-socialist Pacifist Socialist Party and the Christian left Evangelical People's Party. Lankhorst continued his membership of the Tweede Kamer under the new formation. When Ria Beckers left the parliament in 1993 in order to make room for a new political leader, which would lead the party in the 1994 election, Lankhorst took over the position of chair of the parliamentary party ad interim. He would not stand for re-election in the 1994 election.

In 1994 Lankhorst became a Knight in the Order of the Netherlands Lion. After leaving parliament Lankhorst became an alderman in the submunicipality Bos en Lommer in Amsterdam. He left the position 1998 to become an independent advisor on youth policy.

== Decorations ==
Honours
| Ribbon bar | Honour | Country | Date | Comment |
|---|---|---|---|---|
| | Knight of the Order of the Netherlands Lion | Netherlands | 16 May 1994 | |

Party political offices
| Preceded by Ria Beckers | Leader of GreenLeft; 1993–1994 | Succeeded by Ina Brouwer |
| Preceded by Ria Beckers | Parliamentary leader of GreenLeft in the House of Representatives; 1993–1994 | Succeeded by Paul Rosenmöller |
