= Frans Andriessen =

Dutch politician and businessman (1929–2019)

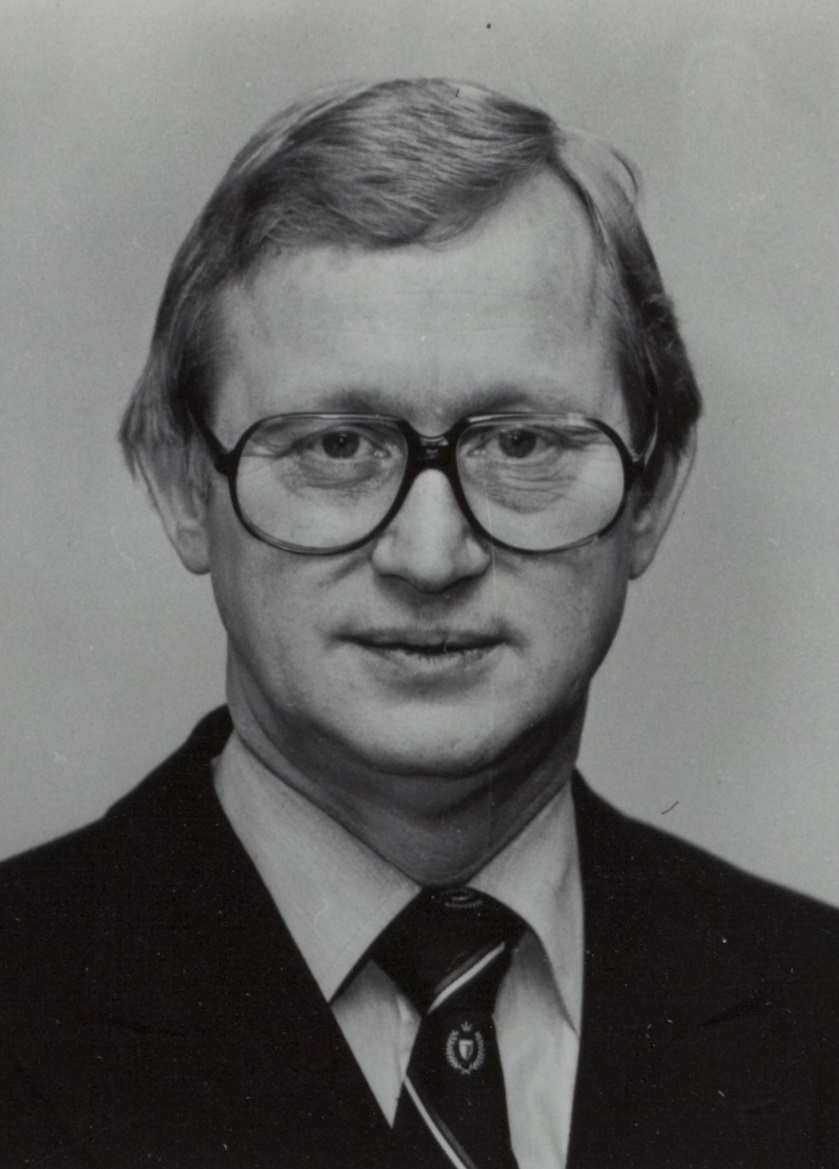
- Andriessen in 1977

European Commissioner^{[Portfolios]}
- In office 6 January 1981 – 6 January 1993
- President: See list: Gaston Thorn (1981–1985) Jacques Delors (1985–1993)
- Preceded by: Henk Vredeling
- Succeeded by: Hans van den Broek

Member of the Senate
- In office 16 September 1980 – 6 January 1981

Minister of Finance
- In office 19 December 1977 – 22 February 1980
- Prime Minister: Dries van Agt
- Preceded by: Wim Duisenberg
- Succeeded by: Gijs van Aardenne (Ad Interim)

Leader of the Catholic People's Party
- In office 1 October 1971 – 25 May 1977
- Preceded by: Gerard Veringa
- Succeeded by: Office discontinued

Parliamentary leader in the House of Representatives
- In office 16 August 1971 – 25 May 1977
- Preceded by: Gerard Veringa
- Succeeded by: Office discontinued
- Parliamentary group: Catholic People's Party

Member of the House of Representatives
- In office 23 February 1967 – 19 December 1977

Personal details
- Born: Franciscus Henricus Johannes Joseph Andriessen; 2 April 1929 Utrecht, Netherlands
- Died: 22 March 2019 (aged 89) Bilthoven, Netherlands
- Party: Christian Democratic Appeal (from 1980)
- Other political affiliations: Catholic People's Party (until 1980)
- Spouse: Catherine Andriessen (m. 1955)
- Education: Utrecht University (LL.B., LL.M.)
- Occupation: Politician · Jurist · Businessperson · Corporate director · Nonprofit director · Lobbyist · Professor
- Frans Andriessen's voice Andriessen discussing the dissolution of the Soviet Union; Recorded 4 September 1991

Franciscus Henricus Johannes Joseph "Frans" Andriessen (2 April 1929 – 22 March 2019) was a Dutch politician of the Catholic People's Party (KVP) and later the Christian Democratic Appeal (CDA) and businessperson who served as European Commissioner from 6 January 1981 until 6 January 1993. He served as Minister of Finance from 1977 until 1980, and as the Netherlands' European Commissioner from 1981 until 1993.

== National political career ==
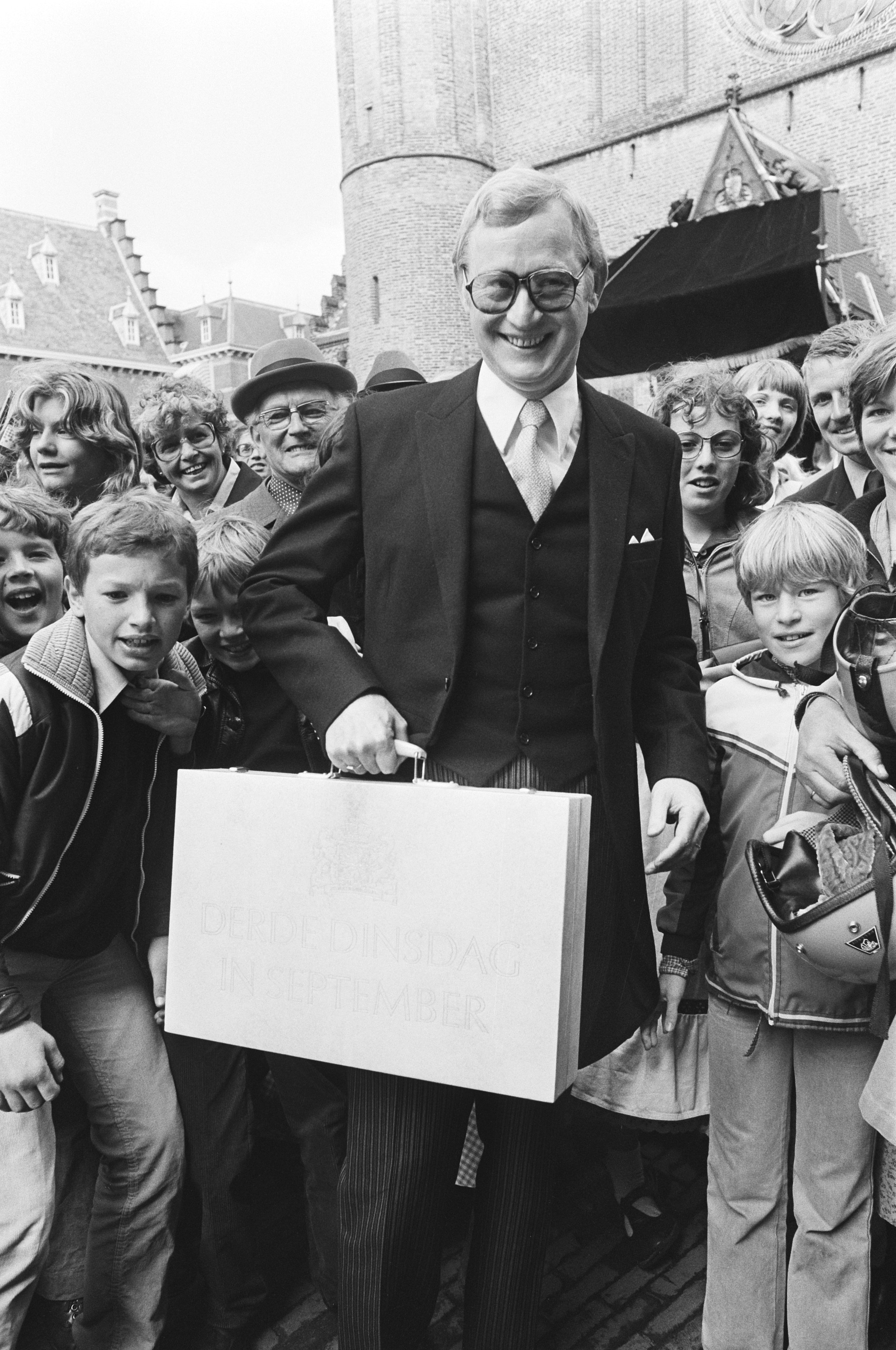
Minister of Finance Frans Andriessen with the Budget Memorandum during Prinsjesdag at the Binnenhof on 19 September 1978.

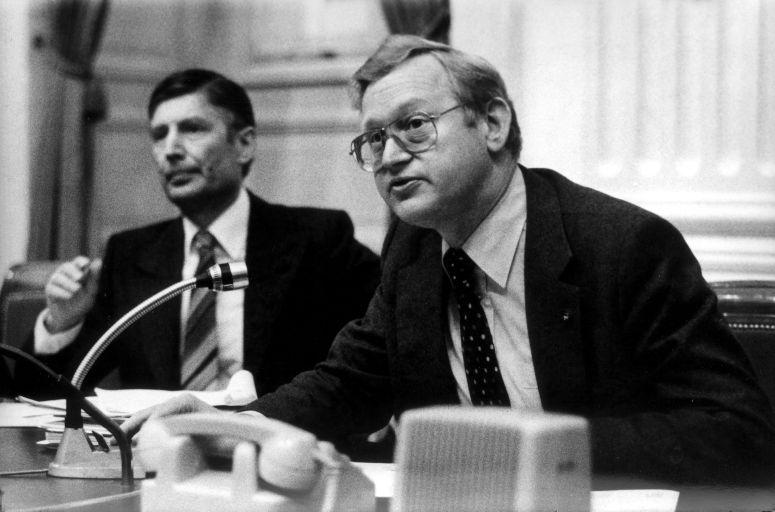
Prime Minister Dries van Agt and Minister of Finance Frans Andriessen during a financial debate in the House of Representatives on 23 May 1979.

Andriessen studied Law at Utrecht University obtaining a Master of Laws degree. Andriessen worked for a construction institute in Utrecht from October 1953 until February 1967 and as CEO from July 1961. From 1958 to 1967 he sat in the Provincial Council of Utrecht.

Andriessen was elected to the House of Representatives in the 1967 general election, taking of office on 23 February 1967. He served as a frontbencher, serving as chair of the standing committees for Public Housing Reform and spokesperson for housing. On 16 August 1971 the party leader and parliamentary leader Gerard Veringa took a medical leave of absence and Andriessen was selected as his interim successor on 16 August 1971. On 28 September 1971, Veringa unexpectedly announced that he was stepping down as leader, and Andriessen was unanimously selected as his permanent successor on 1 October 1971. For the 1972 general election, Andriessen served as lead candidate, and following a successful cabinet formation with Labour Party leader Joop den Uyl formed the Den Uyl cabinet, with Andriessen opting to remain parliamentary leader. After the 1977 general election, Andriessen was appointed Minister of Finance in the Van Agt I cabinet, taking office on 19 December 1977.

After the 1977 general election, Andriessen was appointed Minister of Finance in the centre-right Van Agt I cabinet. He sought bigger cuts than his party would accept, and in February 1980 tendered his resignation, precipitating a cabinet crisis that forced Queen Juliana to interrupt a holiday in Austria. The next month he took a seat in the upper house. He was elected to the Senate in the 1980 Senate election, taking office on 16 September 1980. In the Senate, he served as his party's spokesperson for finance.

== European Commissioner ==
In November 1980 Andriessen was nominated by Prime Minister Dries van Agt as the next European Commissioner in the Thorn Commission, and secured the heavy portfolios of Competition and Parliamentary Relations, taking office on 6 January 1981. As European Commissioner for Competition, Andriessen targeted restrictive practices, with the vastly differing prices of new cars in member states a priority. He settled the high-profile IBM case in 1984. But he came under fire from Socialist MEPs for blocking legislation on worker participation after objections from Shell and Unilever, and from British members for suggesting that Ravenscraig steelworks should be closed. With Gaston Thorn stepping down at the end of 1984, Andriessen was canvassed as a potential president of the Commission, but Jacques Delors had the big battalions behind him. Andriessen's consolation was the First Vice-Presidency and the portfolio of Agriculture and Fisheries, Brussels' toughest, in the Delors Commission, taking office on 6 January 1985. Within weeks he foiled a French attempt to build an EC "lamb mountain".

Negotiating his first farm budget, the stumbling block was German insistence on higher payments to grow cereals; Andriessen complained that the Germans sided with the British on budgetary discipline, yet wanted him to spend more. Germany vetoed the budget after six attempts to agree it. Autumn 1985 brought the first of several "mutton wars" between Britain and France. Andriessen blamed Britain, accusing Michael Jopling, Minister of Agriculture, of disobeying an "order" to change export arrangements for sheep meat. When French farmers hijacked British lamb consignments, Andriessen suggested an export tax to offset the benefits to British exporters of a weak pound; the Commission overruled him. At the start of 1986 Andriessen recommended a general price freeze for the year. He got his way after a 21-hour negotiating session, and later persuaded member states to accept drastic cuts in milk production. His next target was grain surpluses, outlining a plan to cut production which introduced the concept of "set-aside". This was adopted, but only after he blocked ministers' efforts to sneak grain subsidies into other parts of the budget.

Starting on 6 January 1989, Andriessen took the External Relations and Trade portfolio. The Uruguay Round of GATT talks was at the top of his agenda; as a free-trader he saw a faint hope of breaking the deadlock with America. He began by warning Japan that unless it opened its markets, the EC might refuse it licences for banking in Europe. He also told Britain that if it did not want to engage fully with Europe it could go back to the European Free Trade Association (EFTA).

The fall of the Berlin Wall that autumn gave Andriessen new priorities. He proposed a "European Economic Space", enabling EFTA countries to participate in the single market, while opening the door to countries to the East. Within months, he was suggesting affiliate membership of the EC for former Communist satellites. France distrusted this, but the strategy was carried through, after a scare over whether Romania’s post-Ceaucescu government would allow fair elections.

Andriessen's final two years in Brussels were dominated by the GATT talks. By 1992 he was claiming that the dispute now hinged on "a couple of million tons of European grain". But that summer he accused America of "harassing" European steel producers for alleged dumping; then France demanded fresh concessions for its farmers. EC-US talks, with Andriessen and Leon Brittan leading for Europe, made no headway. Then farm subsidy negotiations collapsed, with the outgoing Bush administration blaming Europe; Andriessen promised "countermeasures". Ireland's Agriculture Commissioner Ray McSharry resigned, accusing Delors of going behind his back to sabotage an agreement. Delors faced mutiny from commissioners led by Andriessen and Brittan, who resolved to outvote him on GATT, if necessary forcing his resignation. He backed off, and McSharry returned.

On 20 November 1992, Andriessen and his fellow negotiators finally concluded the GATT agreement on agriculture; the Commission ratified it despite French resistance. Andriessen left Brussels at the turn of the year confident that a full agreement ranging from textiles to intellectual property could be achieved – as it was, enabling the WTO to come into being.

== Retirement and later life ==
Andriessen retired from active politics at 62 and became active in the private and public sectors as a corporate and non-profit director and served on several state commissions and councils on behalf of the government and as a occasional diplomat for economic and diplomatic delegations, and was professor of European integration at his alma mater, Utrecht University, from March 1990 until September 2009. Following his retirement Andriessen continued to be active as an advocate and lobbyist for more European integration. Out of office, he was in demand as one of Europe’s "great and good". This could bring him into trying company: at a symposium in Copenhagen in 1993 he was incandescent when Sir Alan Walters, former economic adviser to Margaret Thatcher, suggested the Germans could put a portrait of Hitler on a single European currency. Andriessen was known for his abilities as a skilful negotiator and effective consensus builder and continued to comment on political affairs as a statesman until his is death in March 2019 at the age of 89. He holds the distinction as the second longest-serving Dutch European Commissioner with 12 years, 0 days. He was a Knight of the Order of the Dutch Lion, and held the Grand Cross of the Order of Orange-Nassau.

== Personal life ==
Andriessen married Catherine Ten Holter in 1955; she survives him with their four children.

== Decorations ==
=== National ===
- Knight Grand Cross of the Order of Orange-Nassau (19 January 1993)
- Officer of the Order of Orange-Nassau (30 April 1969)
- Knight of the Order of the Netherlands Lion (1980)

=== Foreign ===
- Belgium: Grand Cross of the Order of Leopold II (15 December 1990)
- France: Grand Officer of the Order of Legion of Honour (12 February 1982)
- Germany: Grand Cross of the Order of Merit of the Federal Republic of Germany (13 May 1983)
- Holy See: Knight of the Order of the Holy Sepulchre (1972)
- Portugal: Grand Cross of the Order of Prince Henry (31 October 1987)

=== Honorary degrees ===
Honorary degrees
University	Field	Country	Date
Utrecht University	Law	Netherlands	1992

== See also ==
- Delors Committee

Party political offices
Preceded by Gerard Veringa	Parliamentary leader of the Catholic People's Party in the House of Representatives; 1971–1977	Party merged into the Christian Democratic Appeal
Preceded by Gerard Veringa	Leader of the Catholic People's Party; 1971–1977	Party merged into the Christian Democratic Appeal
Preceded by Gerard Veringa (1971)	Lead candidate of the Catholic People's Party; 1972	Party merged into the Christian Democratic Appeal
Political offices
Preceded by Wim Duisenberg	Minister of Finance; 1977–1980	Succeeded by Gijs van Aardenne; Ad interim
Preceded by Henk Vredeling	European Commissioner from the Netherlands; 1981–1993	Succeeded by Hans van den Broek
Preceded by Raymond Vouel	European Commissioner for Competition and Parliamentary Relations; 1981–1985	Succeeded by Peter Sutherland
Preceded by Poul Dalsager	European Commissioner for Agriculture and Fisheries; 1985–1989	Succeeded by Ray MacSharry
Preceded by ?	First Vice-President of the European Commission; 1985–1989	Succeeded by ?
Preceded by Willy De Clercq	European Commissioner for External Relations and Trade; 1989–1993	Succeeded by Hans van den Broek as European Commissioner for External Relations
Preceded by Willy De Clercq	European Commissioner for External Relations and Trade; 1989–1993	Succeeded by Leon Brittan as European Commissioner for Trade
