= Klaas Beuker =

Dutch politician (1924-2000)

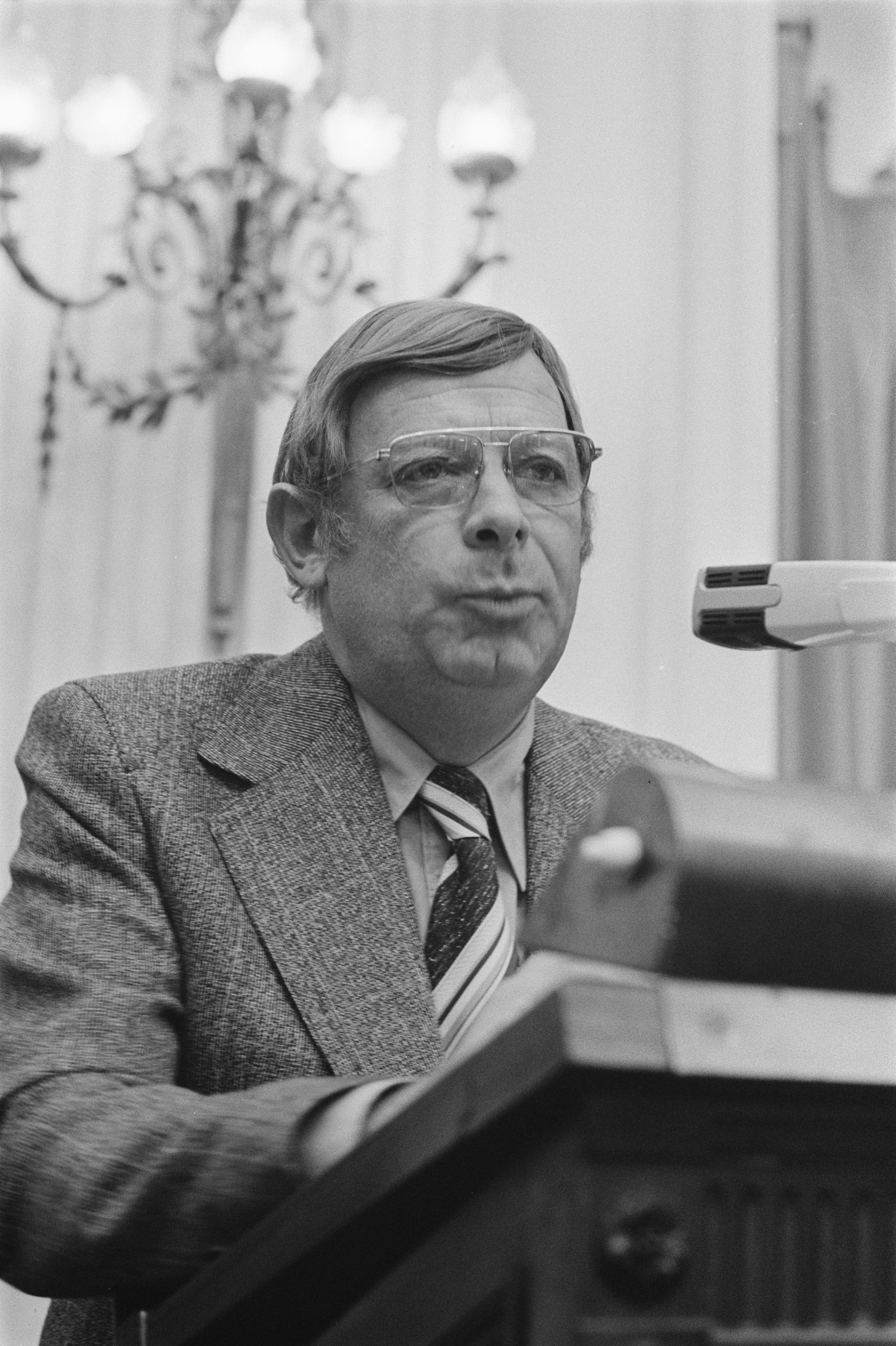
- Klaas Beuker in 1973

Member of the House of Representatives
- In office 7 December 1972 – 8 June 1977

Personal details
- Born: 21 August 1924 Harlingen, Netherlands
- Died: 9 October 2000 (aged 76) Hoogwoud, Netherlands
- Party: RKPN (from 1972)
- Other political affiliations: New Roman Party (1971-1972)
- Spouse: Sjoerdtje Brandsma (m. 1953)
- Children: 6

Klaas Beuker (21 August 1924 - 9 October 2000) was a Dutch politician. He was a member of the Dutch House of Representatives from 1972 to 1977 as the sole representative of the Roman Catholic Party of the Netherlands (RKPN), a traditionalist Catholic political party.

== Early life ==
Klaas Beuker was born on 21 August 1924 in Harlingen to Thomas Paulus Beuker, a carpenter, and Sjieuwke Ketelaar. He was the youngest of seven children in a devout Roman Catholic family, living in a traditionally strongly Protestant area. He attended a seminary in Wijnandsrade in Limburg from 1938, was interrupted by the Second World War. Beuker went into hiding from 1944 to avoid forced labour in Germany, where he met his future wife Sjoerdtje Brandsma, whom he married in 1953.

Following the war, Beuker became a schoolteacher, eventually finding employment at a Catholic primary school in Makkum in 1948 and serving as its principal from 1957, before becoming a Dutch teacher at a secondary school in Hoorn in 1960. While serving as an MP, he would continue to teach part time.

He was a staunch conservative in religious matters, opposing what he saw as the growing influence of modernist and progressive views within the Catholic Church and Dutch society as a whole, which was undergoing an increasingly rapid process of secularisation during this period.

== Political career ==
Beuker's traditionalist views brought him into conflict with the Catholic People's Party (KVP), the political party representing Dutch Catholics. He considered the KVP as having betrayed the Catholic faith due to what he saw as its overly permissive attitude towards drugs and pornography, its policy of allowing abortion in case of a threat to the mother's health, as well as its cooperation with the Protestant Anti-Revolutionary Party and Christian Historical Union. As a consequence, Beuker joined the conservative Catholic New Roman Party (Nieuwe Roomse Partij, NRP) in 1971, being placed on the third spot on the NRP party list for the 1971 Dutch general election. The NRP had been founded in 1971 by Tine Cuijpers-Boumans, a conservative Catholic activist who strongly opposed the KVP's acceptance of the birth control pill among other perceived progressive stances, but failed to obtain enough votes for a seat in the House of Representatives. Following this electoral failure, Beuker split with Cuijpers-Boumans and founded the Roman Catholic Party of the Netherlands (RKPN) on 31 January 1972, becoming its chairman.

Beuker was elected to the House of Representatives in the 1972 Dutch general election as the RKPN's sole representative. As an MP, Beuker, who labeled himself as a "front soldier" in the fight for Christian morality, spoke out forcefully against the perceived moral degeneracy of contemporary Dutch society, including immoral films and television broadcasts, drug use, and streaking. He strongly opposed the progressive policies of the Den Uyl cabinet, most notably its desire to loosen legal restrictions on abortion, which Beuker considered a violation of the right to life. He also supported the protection of the nuclear family as well as the Catholic education system.

Beuker's leadership as chairman of the RKPN faced significant internal criticism over his controlling leadership style, neglecting party building and lack of transparency. In 1973, a group of members, nicknamed the Club of Utrecht, staged an internal coup by calling a party meeting and electing a new party leadership, thus deposing Beuker. A court case in 1974 ruled in favour of the new party leadership but Beuker appealed the decision, which was overturned a few months later, thus returning Beuker to his position as RKPN chairman.

In the campaign for the 1977 election, Beuker harshly condemned the Den Uyl cabinet, supported in his view by the Christian Democratic Appeal (CDA), as wanting to establish a communist dictatorship, and claimed that the People's Republic of China was using Chinese restaurants to attempt to occupy the Netherlands. Having its image weakened by internal conflicts, the RKPN lost its seat in the House of Representatives in the 1977 Dutch general election, marking the end of Beuker's term as MP. He would head the RKPN list again in the 1981 and 1982 Dutch general elections, but failed to regain his seat.

== Later life ==
After leaving politics, Beuker remained active in the Catholic Church. In 1979, Beuker founded the organization Trouw aan de Paus (Loyal to the Pope), to combat a perceived lack of loyalty to the Roman Catholic Church hierarchy in Rome among Dutch Catholics. He led a campaign for the beatification of Titus Brandsma, a Catholic priest murdered in Dachau concentration camp for his opposition to Nazism and a relative of his wife, which led to Brandsma being beatified by Pope John Paul II in 1985. That same year, he aroused controversy through his claims of holding private meetings with Pope John Paul II on the situation of the Catholic Church in the Netherlands, which led to a feud with cardinal Adrianus Johannes Simonis, and were denied by the Vatican. After this period, he gradually retreated from public life.

Klaas Beuker died in Hoogwoud on 9 October 2000.
