= Fortman =

Fortman is a surname. Notable people with the name include:

- Dave Fortman (born 1967), American record producer and musician
- Laura Fortman (born 1954), American government employee, non-profit executive, women's rights activist
- Richard Fortman (1915–2008), champion checkers player and authority on the game

== See also ==
- Dan Fortmann (1916–1995), American football guard and linebacker
- De Gaay Fortman, Dutch surname
  - Bas de Gaay Fortman (born 1937), retired Dutch politician and diplomat
  - Gaius de Gaay Fortman (1911–1997), Dutch jurist and politician of the Anti-Revolutionary Party
