= Bas de Gaay Fortman =

Dutch politician and diplomat (born 1937)

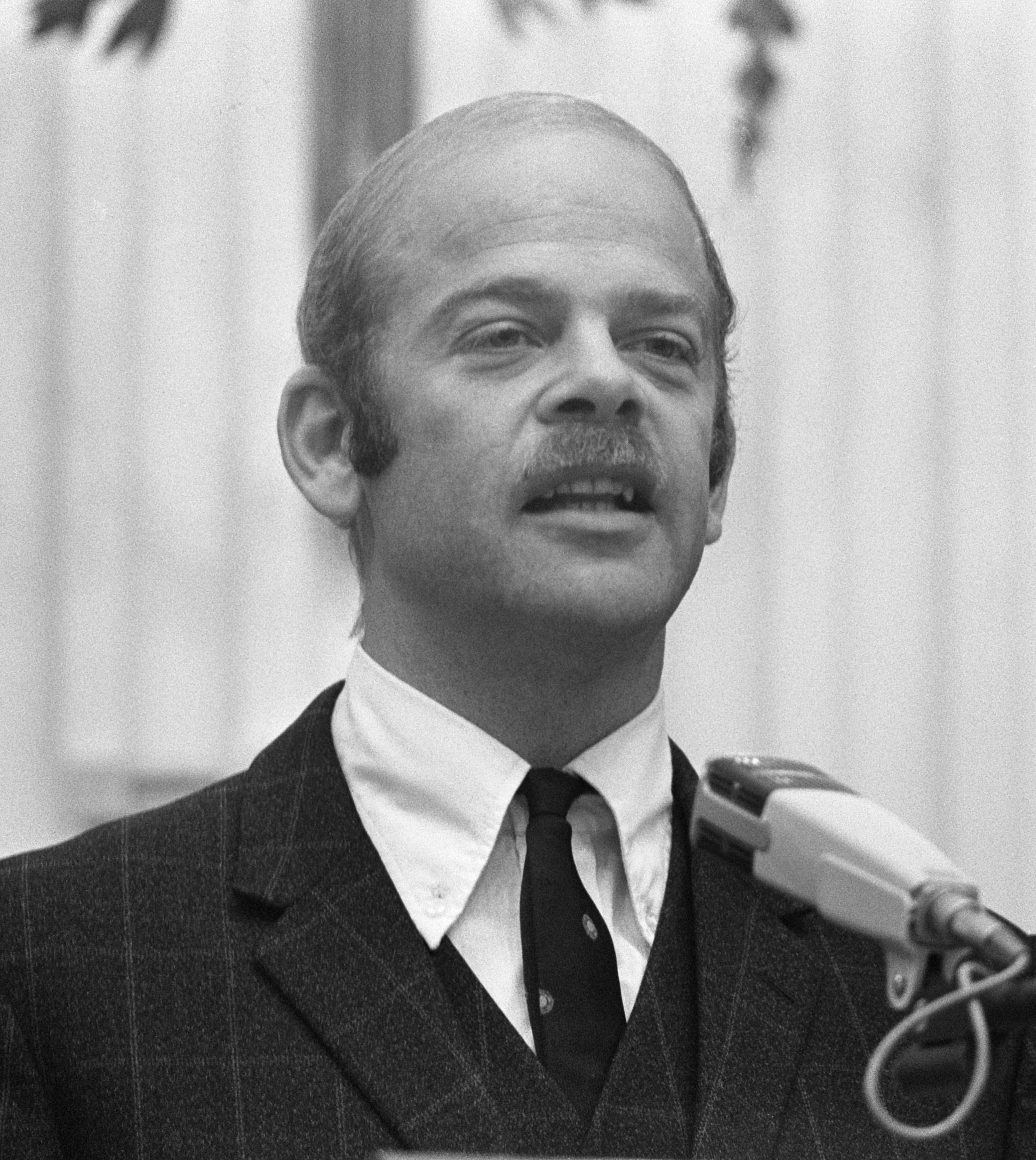
- De Gaay Fortman in 1974

Parliamentary leader in the Senate
- In office 20 September 1977 – 1 February 1991
- Preceded by: Office established
- Succeeded by: Fenna Bolding
- Parliamentary group: GroenLinks (1989–1991); Political Party of Radicals (1977–1989)

Member of the Senate
- In office 20 September 1977 – 1 February 1991
- Parliamentary group: GroenLinks (1989–1991); Political Party of Radicals (1977–1989)

Leader of the Political Party of Radicals
- In office 30 November 1972 – 25 May 1977
- Preceded by: Jacques Aarden
- Succeeded by: Ria Beckers

Parliamentary leader in the House of Representatives
- In office 30 November 1972 – 25 May 1977
- Preceded by: Jacques Aarden
- Succeeded by: Ria Beckers
- Parliamentary group: Political Party of Radicals

Member of the House of Representatives
- In office 25 May 1971 – 8 June 1977

Personal details
- Born: Bastiaan de Gaay Fortman; 6 November 1937 (age 88) The Hague, Netherlands
- Party: GroenLinks (from 1989)
- Other political affiliations: Political Party of Radicals (1970–1989); Anti-Revolutionary Party (until 1970)
- Children: Marry de Gaay Fortman (born 1965)
- Parent: Gaius de Gaay Fortman (1911–1997) (father)
- Education: Vrije Universiteit Amsterdam (Bachelor of Laws, Bachelor of Economics, Master of Laws, Master of Economics, Doctor of Philosophy)
- Occupation: Politician · Diplomat · Civil servant · Jurist · Economist · Researcher · Nonprofit director · Academic administrator · Activist · Author · Professor

Bastiaan "Bas" de Gaay Fortman (born 6 November 1937) is a retired Dutch politician and diplomat of the Political Party of Radicals (PPR) and later the GroenLinks (GL) party and economist.

== Career before politics ==
After attending public elementary education, he attended the Christian Gymnasium in The Hague, specialising in sciences. After graduating in 1956 he studied law and economics at the Vrije Universiteit Amsterdam, receiving his Master of Law, and Doctorandus in Economy in 1963 cum laude. In the last four years of his study he taught Civil Law, Commercial Law and Political Economics. Following graduation he became a fellow at the Social Faculty of the Free University, and wrote his dissertation in Economics. During this period he taught macro- and micro-economic theory. In 1966, he received his Ph.D. in Economics for his dissertation "Theory of competition policy".

In 1967, De Gaay Fortman left Amsterdam to become a senior lecturer at the University of Zambia in Lusaka, where he was head of the Economic faculty. Here he taught Economics of Rural Development, and Theory of the Economic Order. In 1968, he was appointed Chairman of the Agricultural Prices and Marketing Committee, an advisory Body of the Zambian government. He wrote two books about his residence in Zambia: After Mulungushi: The Economics of Zambian Humanism in 1967 and The Third World in Movement, a message from Zambia in 1972.

While in Zambia, De Gaay Fortman kept close tabs on the developments in Dutch politics. De Gaay Fortman was a member of the Christian democratic Anti-Revolutionary Party. In 1970, he joined a group of so-called spijtstemmers ("regret voters") or Americain Group (after restaurant Americain, where the group regularly met). The group regretted that their party, ARP, had joined a coalition with the liberal People's Party for Freedom and Democracy (VVD) instead of the social democratic Labour Party (PvdA). In 1967, he edited the book Christian-Radical, in which a new left-wing Christian faith was articulated. In 1970, he left the ARP to join the Political Party of Radicals (PPR), a Christian-radical party set up by former members of the Catholic People's Party (KVP), who also regretted the Christian democratic/liberal coalition.

== Political career ==
In 1971, De Gaay Fortman returned to the Netherlands from Zambia for the PPR's campaign for the 1971 general election. He was one of the party's two lead candidates. The party won two seats in the House of Representatives, one of which was to be occupied by De Gaay-Fortman. During his period in the House of Representatives, he was Professor Extraordinary of Economic Development at the Institute of Social Studies in The Hague. After the election he became Shadow Minister for International Development in the Den Uyl shadow cabinet.

He led the party in the 1972 general election, in which the PPR more than tripled its seat count to seven. De Gaay Fortman became the leader of the parliamentary party. Between 1973 and 1975 he was vice-chair of the Defence Committee of the House of Representatives.

He seemed an atypical PPR member, well-educated, upper-class, and with his affected speech. De Gaay however, was very popular under young people. In parliament he showed a keen interest in development cooperation.

== Career after politics ==
Before 1977 general election, the younger Ria Beckers succeeded De Gaay Fortman. De Gaay Fortman became a member of the Senate, where he would remain until 1991. During this entire period he was the party's leader in the Senate. After 1981, however, his party was a one-man party. In 1989, his party, the PPR, merged with the Pacifist Socialist Party, the Communist Party of the Netherlands and the Evangelical People's Party to become GroenLinks. De Gaay Fortman remained Senator for this party.

During this period De Gaay Fortman returned to his passion, scholarship. He was professor of Political Economy at the Institute for Social Studies between 1977 and 2002. He also held many positions in the World of Development Cooperation: most importantly he was president of NOVIB, the Dutch branch of Oxfam, between 1977 and 1984.

In 1990, he gave up his seat in the House of Representatives to become delegate for the Reformed Church at the Assembly of the World Council of Churches in Canberra. In 1990, he also founded Economists for Peace, with the late Jan Tinbergen.

After 1991 Bas de Gaay Fortman has held numerous research positions: from 1991 to 1993 he was the director of research for the Institute for Social Studies. Here he taught Political Economy of Jurisprudence, Transition and Development. In 1992, he served as the chair of the Joint Steering Committee of the Netherlands Israeli Palestinian Research Programme (NIRP). From 1992 to 1998, he was a researcher in both the Research School for Development Studies (CERES) and the Netherlands Research School on Human Rights. From 1992 to 1993 he was the chair of the Directorate of the CERES School of Excellence in which six Dutch universities participated. Since 2000 he has been the chair of the Working Programme Formation and Disintegration of States of CERES.

De Gaay Fortman also served as correspondent in the Netherlands for several development programs, such as the United Nations Development Program and the European Commission's.

In 2002 he became professor of Political Economy of Human Rights at the Utrecht University. He is the only chair in Political Economy of Human Rights in the world. Until 2005, he taught his trademark class "Political Economy of Human Rights", which was part of the Master in Conflict Studies at University of Utrecht. In this class, the majority of the readings used are his own unpublished works. In 2002 he also became a member of the permanent committee for Development Cooperation of the Advisory Council for International Questions of the Minister of Foreign Affairs. Since 2003 he has been the vice-president of the Prins Claus Chair of the University of Utrecht and the ISS. From 2003 to 2004 he was the Msgr Willy Onclin Professor of Comparative Canon Law at the Catholic University of Louvain.

His research interests focus on the political economy of law, human rights and jurisprudence and political economy of conflict and collective violence.

De Gaay Fortman has written and edited many books on Development Cooperation and many other subjects including: Help we're developed in 1978, The Art of Ivory turning in 1979, New Progress in 1984, The Small path between Power and Morale in 1989, Internal Conflicts, Security and Development in 1997, God and Goods. Global Economy in a Civilizational Perspective in 1998, Globalization and Its New Divides: Malcontents, Recipes and Reform in 2003, and From Warfare to Welfare. Human Security in a Southern African Context in 2004.

== Political views ==
As a devoted human rights activist, De Gaay Fortman has championed the idea that every human being has human dignity which is meant to convey an idea of absolute and inherent worth. He outlined the necessary preconditions for broad respect for human dignity through his "Golden Triangle of Human Dignity". Each corner of the triangle houses one of the three manifestations of human dignity: human security, human rights, and human development.

== Private life ==
De Gaay Fortman adheres to the reformed religion. He is a member of the De Gaay Fortman family. His father was Gaius de Gaay Fortman, a prominent Dutch politician who served as Minister of the Interior. W. F. and B. de Gaay Fortman served as members of the Senate together, but representing different political parties.

De Gaay Fortman is known for travelling to many places. As a member of parliament, international observer, researcher or visiting professor, he has visited numerous countries in South America, Africa and Asia focusing on Zambia and Malawi. In addition to Dutch, he is fluent in French, English, German, Chewa, Spanish and Afrikaans.

== Quotes ==
- "The Melians, however, do not accept, trusting in the justice of their cause and hoping for the help of the Gods and the Spartans." −2001 unpublished essay on Laborious Law
- "Violations of basic human rights affect the overall quality of life." −1999 unpublished work "Where Needs Meet Rights," p. 10
- "The lack of a socio-economic perspective, as a result of poverty and exclusion, may be seen as a major factor contributing to intrastate violence" – From his work on the human security gap, "The Golden Triangle of Human Dignity: Human Security, Human Development, and Human Rights."
- "Human rights, then, is to be seen as a laborious, but not impossible, venture and from a civilizational perspective a crucial challenge in our world today." – 2001 unpublished essay on Laborious Law

== Decorations ==
Honours
Ribbon bar	Honour	Country	Date	Comment
	Knight of the Order of the Netherlands Lion	Netherlands	30 April 1984	
	Commander of the Order of Orange-Nassau	Netherlands	1 February 1991	

Party political offices
Preceded by Jacques Aarden; 1971	Lead candidate of the Political Party of Radicals; 1972	Succeeded by Ria Beckers; 1977
Preceded by Jacques Aarden	Leader of the Political; Party of Radicals; 1972–1977	Succeeded by Ria Beckers
Preceded by Jacques Aarden	Parliamentary leader of the Political Party of Radicals in the House of Representatives; 1972–1977	Succeeded by Ria Beckers
Preceded by Marinus Agterberg	Parliamentary leader of the Political Party of Radicals in the Senate; 1977–1989	Party merged into GroenLinks
New political party	Parliamentary leader of GroenLinks in the Senate; 1989–1991	Succeeded by Fenna Bolding
