= Roman Catholic Party of the Netherlands =

Dutch Traditionalist Catholic political party

The Roman Catholic Party Netherlands (Dutch: Rooms Katholieke Partij Nederland, RKPN) was a Traditionalist Catholic political party in the Netherlands. The RKPN played a marginal role in Dutch politics.

== History ==
The RKPN was founded by former members of the Catholic People's Party who were upset with what they saw as the liberal course of their party. In the 1972 general election, the party won one seat, which was taken by party chair Klaas Beuker. In 1974, a conflict between Beuker and the party board caused him to continue as an independent MP. The party unsuccessfully contested the 1977 general election.

== Ideology and issues ==
The RKPN was a Traditionalist Catholic testimonial party in contrast to the pragmatic and liberal course of the Catholic People's Party. The party took the Ten Commandments as their main perspective and followed the conservative course of Pope Paul VI.

The RKPN sought to strengthen Catholic schools and youth work. It wanted the government to act against euthanasia and abortion.

== Support and leadership ==
This table shows the RKPN's results in elections to the House of Representatives and Senate, as well as the party's political leadership: the parliamentary leader and the lead candidate in general elections; these posts are normally taken by the party's leader.

Year	HoR	S	Lead candidate	Parliamentary leader
1972	1	0	Klaas Beuker	Klaas Beuker
1973	1	0	no election	Klaas Beuker
1974	1	0	no election	Klaas Beuker
1975	1	0	no election	Klaas Beuker
1976	1	0	no election	Klaas Beuker

== Electorate ==
The party was mainly supported by Catholics who followed more conservative bishops like Adrianus Johannes Simonis.

== International comparison ==
Domestically, the RKPN as a testimonial party can best be compared to the orthodox Protestant Reformed Political Party. Internationally, it is comparable to small Traditionalist Catholic parties like the Irish Christian Solidarity Party.
