= NMP =

NMP could refer to:

== Science ==
- The New Millennium Program, a spaceflight technology initiative at NASA
- North Magnetic Pole of the Earth
- Non-measured points in metrology

=== Chemistry ===
- Nucleoside monophosphate
- N-Methylpyrrolidone, an organic solvent
- Nitroxide mediated radical polymerization, a method of controlled polymerization

== Politics ==
- New Middle Party, a Dutch political party
- Newham Monitoring Project, an anti-racist organisation / political pressure group in England
- Nominated Members of Parliament, nonpartisan MPs in Singapore appointed by the president
- NMP (political party), a defunct minor party in New Zealand

== Others ==
- Net material product, statistical index used in the USSR as a substitute to GDP
- Northampton railway station, National Rail code NMP.
- NMP (Not My Problem), is a common abbreviation used as a response to email or memo messages, to flag that the previous message has been ignored
- National military park, one of four designations for 25 historical battle sites in the United States
- Najświętsza Maria Panna, a Polish church dedication commonly abbreviated to NMP. Translates as "Our Virgin Mary".
