= Jopie Knol =

Dutch politician (1926–2022)

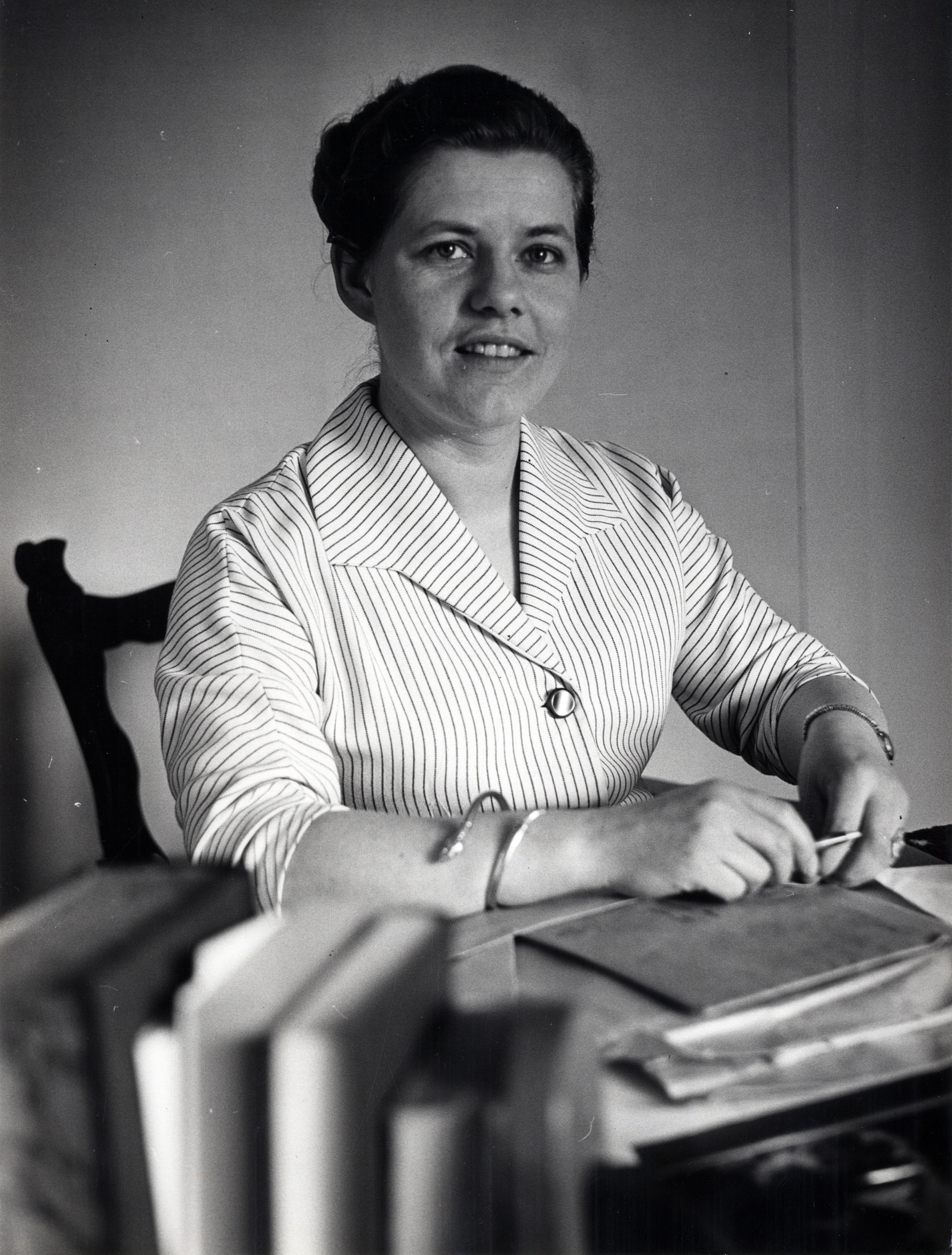
Knol in 1959

Johanna Maria Theresia "Jopie" van der Heijden-Knol (7 February 1926 - 18 March 2022) was a former Dutch politician. Born in Enschede, she was a schoolteacher by profession. She served as a representative of the Catholic People's Party (KVP) in the House of Representatives from 1959 to 1963. In 1968, Knol left the KVP to join the Political Party of Radicals (PPR), and was later active in the Women's Party in the late 1980s.

Knol died on 18 March 2022 at the age of 96.
