= Gerard Veringa =

Dutch politician (1924–1999)

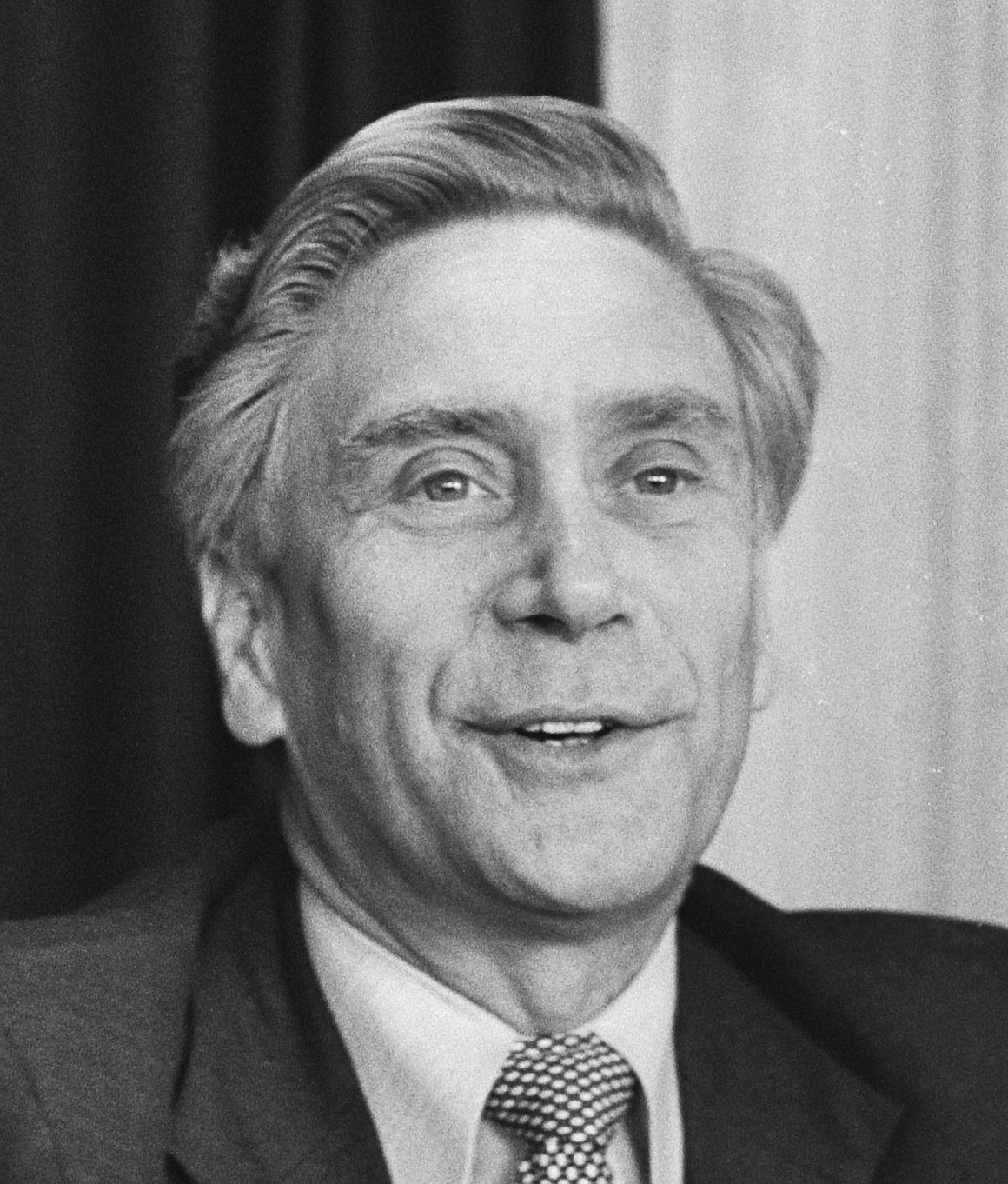
- Gerard Veringa in 1977

Member of the Council of State
- In office 1 February 1972 – 1 May 1994
- Vice President: See list: Louis Beel (1972) Marinus Ruppert (1972–1980) Willem Scholten (1980–1994)

Member of the House of Representatives
- In office 11 May 1971 – 1 February 1972
- Parliamentary group: Catholic People's Party

Parliamentary leader in the House of Representatives
- In office 11 May 1971 – 16 August 1971
- Preceded by: Cor Kleisterlee Jr.
- Succeeded by: Frans Andriessen
- Parliamentary group: Catholic People's Party

Leader of the Catholic People's Party
- In office 25 February 1971 – 1 October 1971
- Preceded by: Norbert Schmelzer
- Succeeded by: Frans Andriessen

Minister of Culture, Recreation and Social Work
- In office 7 January 1971 – 22 February 1971; Ad interim
- Prime Minister: Piet de Jong
- Preceded by: Marga Klompé
- Succeeded by: Marga Klompé

Minister of Education and Sciences
- In office 5 April 1967 – 6 July 1971
- Prime Minister: Piet de Jong
- Preceded by: Isaäc Arend Diepenhorst
- Succeeded by: Chris van Veen

Personal details
- Born: Gerard Heinrich Veringa; 13 April 1924 Groningen, Netherlands
- Died: 29 December 1999 (aged 75) Rijswijk, Netherlands
- Party: Christian Democratic Appeal (from 1980)
- Other political affiliations: Catholic People's Party (until 1980)
- Spouse: Elisabeth Swarte (m. 1952)
- Children: 5 children
- Education: University of Groningen (Bachelor of Laws); Fordham University (Master of Criminal Justice, Master of Social Science, Doctor of Philosophy)
- Occupation: Politician · Civil servant · Jurist · Criminologist · Sociologist · Researcher · Prison administrator · Nonprofit director · Professor

Gerard Heinrich Veringa (13 April 1924 – 29 December 1999) was a Dutch politician of the defunct Catholic People's Party (KVP) now merged into the Christian Democratic Appeal (CDA) party and criminologist.

== Biography ==
Veringa attended a Gymnasium in Groningen from April 1936 until May 1942 and applied at the University of Groningen in June 1945 majoring in Law and obtaining a Bachelor of Laws degree in June 1946 before switching to Criminology and Political science and transferring to the Fordham University in New York City in July 1946 before graduating with a Master of Criminal Justice degree and a Master of Social Science degree September 1947 and worked as a researcher at the Fordham University before he got a doctorate as a Doctor of Philosophy in Criminology in August 1949. Veringa worked as a civics teacher at Manhattan College in New York City from September 1948 until December 1949 and worked as a researcher at the University of Groningen from December 1949 until February 1952. Veringa worked as a civil servant for the Custodial Institutions Agency of the Ministry of Justice from February 1952 until January 1964 as a prison administrator in Zutphen from February 1952 until October 1955 and a prison administrator in The Hague from October 1955 until March 1962. Veringa served on the Municipal Council of Rijswijk from September 1958 until April 1967. Veringa also worked as a legal advisor for the Ministry of Justice from November 1959 until April 1967 and served as Director-General of the Custodial Institutions Agency from October 1961 until January 1964. Veringa worked as an associate professor of Criminology at the Radboud University Nijmegen from 1 January 1964 until 1 September 1965 and as a professor of Criminal law and Criminology at the Radboud University Nijmegen from 1 September 1965 until 5 April 1967.

After the election of 1967 Veringa was appointed as Minister of Education and Sciences in the Cabinet De Jong, taking office on 5 April 1967. Veringa served as acting Minister of Culture, Recreation and Social Work from 7 January 1971 until 22 February 1971 during a medical leave of absence of Marga Klompé. After the Leader of the Catholic People's Party and Parliamentary leader of the Catholic People's Party in the House of Representatives Norbert Schmelzer unexpectedly announced that he was stepping down as Leader and Parliamentary leader in the House of Representatives, the Catholic People's Party leadership approached Veringa as a candidate to succeed him, Veringa accepted and became the Leader of the Catholic People's Party and became the Lijsttrekker (top candidate) of the Catholic People's Party for the election of 1971, taking office on 25 February 1971. The Catholic People's Party suffered a loss, losing 7 seats and fell back as the second largest party and now had 35 seats in the House of Representatives. Veringa was subsequently elected as a Member of the House of Representatives and as Parliamentary leader in the House of Representatives, taking office on 11 May 1971. The following cabinet formation of 1971 resulted in a coalition agreement between the Catholic People's Party, the People's Party for Freedom and Democracy (VVD), the Anti-Revolutionary Party (ARP, the Christian Historical Union (CHU) and the Democratic Socialists '70 (DS'70) which formed the Cabinet Biesheuvel I with Veringa opting to remain in the House of Representatives instead of accepting a cabinet post in the new cabinet and he continued to serve in the House of Representatives as Parliamentary leader, the Cabinet De Jong was replaced by the new cabinet on 6 July 1971. On 16 August 1971 Veringa took a temporary medical leave of absence as Parliamentary leader but on 28 September 1971 Veringa unexpectedly announced that he was stepping down as Leader permanently but continued to serve in the House of Representatives as a backbencher.

In January 1972 Veringa was nominated as Member of the Council of State, he resigned as a Member of the House of Representatives the same day he was installed as a Member of the Council of State, serving from 1 February 1972 until 1 May 1994. Veringa also became active in the public sector and occupied numerous seats as a nonprofit director on several boards of directors and supervisory boards and served on several state commissions and councils on behalf of the government (Raad voor Cultuur, Public Pension Funds APB, Cadastre Agency and the Probation Agency).

Veringa was known for his abilities as a negotiator and consensus builder. Veringa continued to comment on political affairs until his is death at the age of 75.

== Decorations ==
Honours
Ribbon bar	Honour	Country	Date	Comment
	Knight of the Order of the Holy Sepulchre	Holy See	20 September 1968	
	Grand Officer of the Order of Leopold II	Belgium	4 February 1969	
	Commander of the Order of the Oak Crown	Luxembourg	28 September 1970	
	Knight Commander of the Order of Merit	Germany	21 March 1971	
	Grand Officer of the Legion of Honour	France	17 Augustus 1979	
	Commander of the Order of Isabella the Catholic	Spain	8 March 1982	
	Knight of the Order of St. Gregory the Great	Holy See	24 December 1988	
	Grand Officer of the Order of Orange-Nassau	Netherlands	22 December 1993	Elevated from Commander (28 April 1978)
	Commander of the Order of the Netherlands Lion	Netherlands	30 April 1996	Elevated from Knight (17 July 1971)

Party political offices
Preceded by Norbert Schmelzer; 1967	Lijsttrekker of the Catholic People's Party; 1971	Succeeded by Frans Andriessen; 1972
Preceded by Norbert Schmelzer	Leader of the Catholic; People's Party; 1971	Succeeded by Frans Andriessen
Preceded by Cor Kleisterlee Jr.	Parliamentary leader of the Catholic People's Party in the House of Representatives; 1971	Succeeded by Frans Andriessen
Political offices
Preceded by Isaäc Arend; Diepenhorst	Minister of Education and Sciences; 1967–1971	Succeeded by Chris van Veen
Preceded by Marga Klompé	Minister of Culture, Recreation and Social Work; Ad interim 1971	Succeeded by Marga Klompé
Civic offices
Unknown	Director-General of the Custodial Institutions Agency of the Ministry of Justice; 1961–1964	Unknown
Unknown	Chairman of the Supervisory board of the Probation Agency; 1972–1982	Unknown
