= Evangelical People's Party =

Evangelical People's Party may refer to:

- Evangelical People's Party (Netherlands), a defunct political party in the Netherlands
- Evangelical People's Party of Switzerland, a current political party in Switzerland
