= Ab te Pas =

Dutch politician (1910–1981)

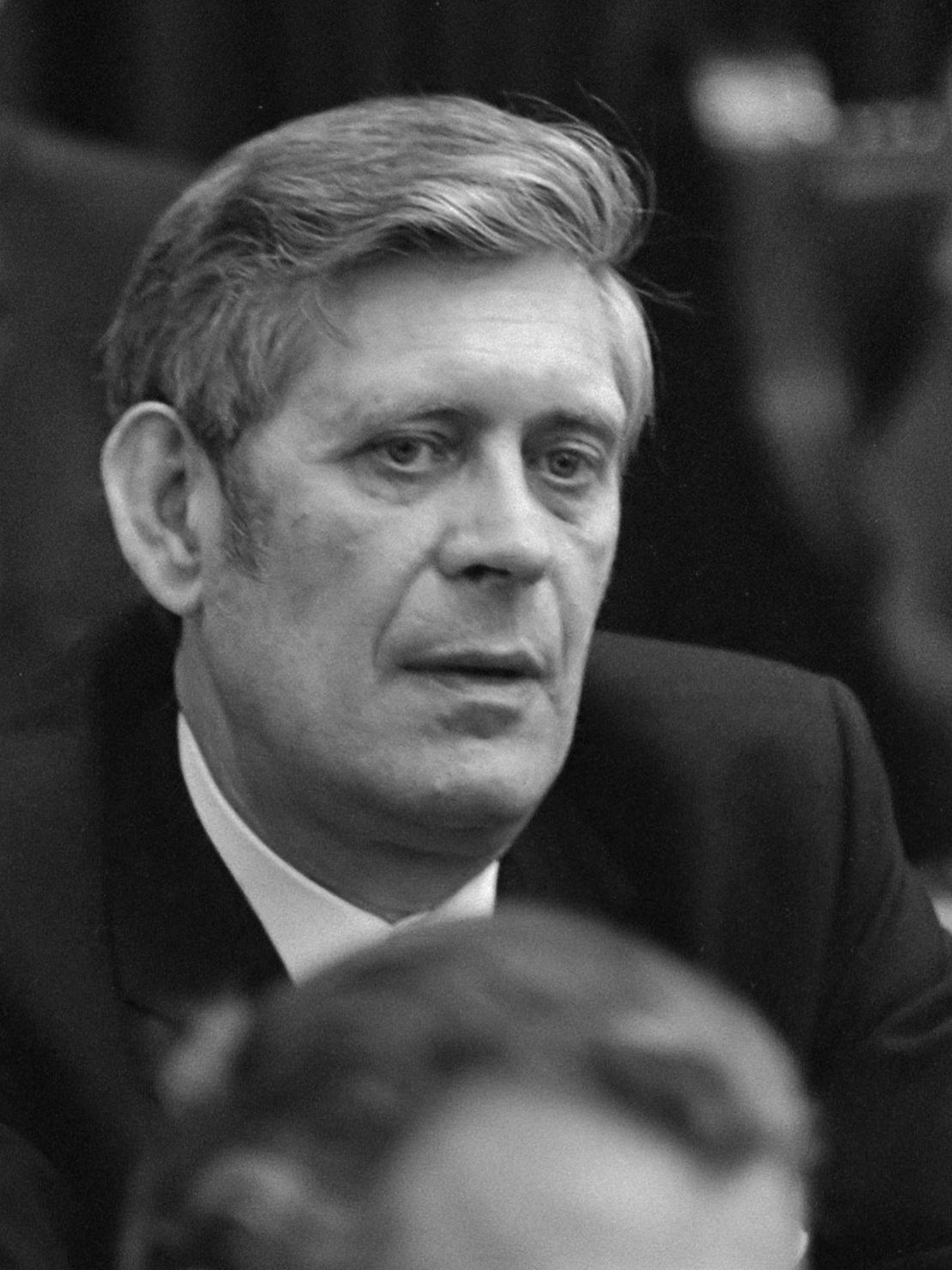
- Ab te Pas in 1971

Member of the House of Representatives
- In office 11 May 1971 – 7 December 1972

Personal details
- Born: Albertus Wilhelmus te Pas; 6 August 1910 Amsterdam, Netherlands
- Died: 11 March 1981 (aged 70) Amsterdam, Netherlands
- Party: NMP

Albertus Wilhelmus "Ab" te Pas (August 27, 1908 – January 22, 1973) was a Dutch politician. He was a member of the Dutch House of Representatives for the Dutch Middle Class Party (NMP) from 1971 to 1972, during which he was embroiled in conflict with his fellow MP Jacques de Jong and party chairman Martin Dessing.

== Biography ==
Ab te Pas was born on 6 August 1910 in Amsterdam. He completed his secondary education in Amsterdam, after which he attended night school for three years to study business and subsequently attended a private school to study constitutional law. From 1926 to 1966, Te Pas worked as a manager in the Dutch Municipal Health Service, after which he became director of a wholesale firm selling paintings.

In 1970, Te Pas became involved with the Dutch Middle Class Party (Nederlandse Middenstands Partij; NMP), becoming the party's chairman that same year. During the 1971 Dutch general election, Te Pas headed the NMP's electoral list, and campaigned on issues including the administration of the value-added tax, which Te Pas likened to slavery, and other issues affecting small and medium business owners and entrepreneurs, with the hope of obtaining 16 to 20 seats. Te Pas was elected to the House of Representatives alongside Jacques de Jong, replacing party secretary Martin Dessing, when the party obtained two seats in that year's election.

During his maiden speech as an MP, in which he profusely praised De Jong for his performance on television and informed the House he could not participate in that day's debate until he had been briefed by De Jong, Te Pas was laughed at by his colleagues for stumbling over his words. As an MP, Te Pas rarely spoke, only doing so on tax issues involving automobiles and municipal boundary changes. He was frequently absent from debates, including from debates on issues directly affecting his voting base.

A few days after entering the House of Representatives, Te Pas was accused of corruption by his colleague De Jong, who said Te Pas made him pay 30,000 guilders into the NMP party coffers. In August 1971 De Jong unsuccessfully objected to Te Pas becoming the NMP's parliamentary leader, despite the NMP party executive voting to bar Te Pas from the position. De Jong then left the NMP, citing attempted "blackmail" from Te Pas and NMP party secretary Dessing, leaving Te Pas as the sole representative of the NMP. A subsequent attempt by De Jong to not be seated next to Te Pas in the House of Representatives also failed. After Te Pas accused De Jong in an NMP publication of embezzling the party's election deposit paid by Te Pas to pay for his own new party newspaper De Jong sued Te Pas for defamation, which Te Pas lost, being forced to cease the publication of the offending newspaper.

In the 1972 Dutch general election the NMP lost both its seats, and Te Pas subsequently left the House of Representatives. That same year, Te Pas removed Martin Dessing as the NMP's treasurer, who then sued Te Pas to challenge the removal, which the court ruled to be unjustified. After the lawsuit, the NMP's funds, including Te Pas's salary, were seized by the court, until another ruling two weeks later lifted the previous court order.

Ab te Pas died on 11 March 1981 in Amsterdam.
