= Cathy Ubels-Veen =

Dutch politician (1928–2015)

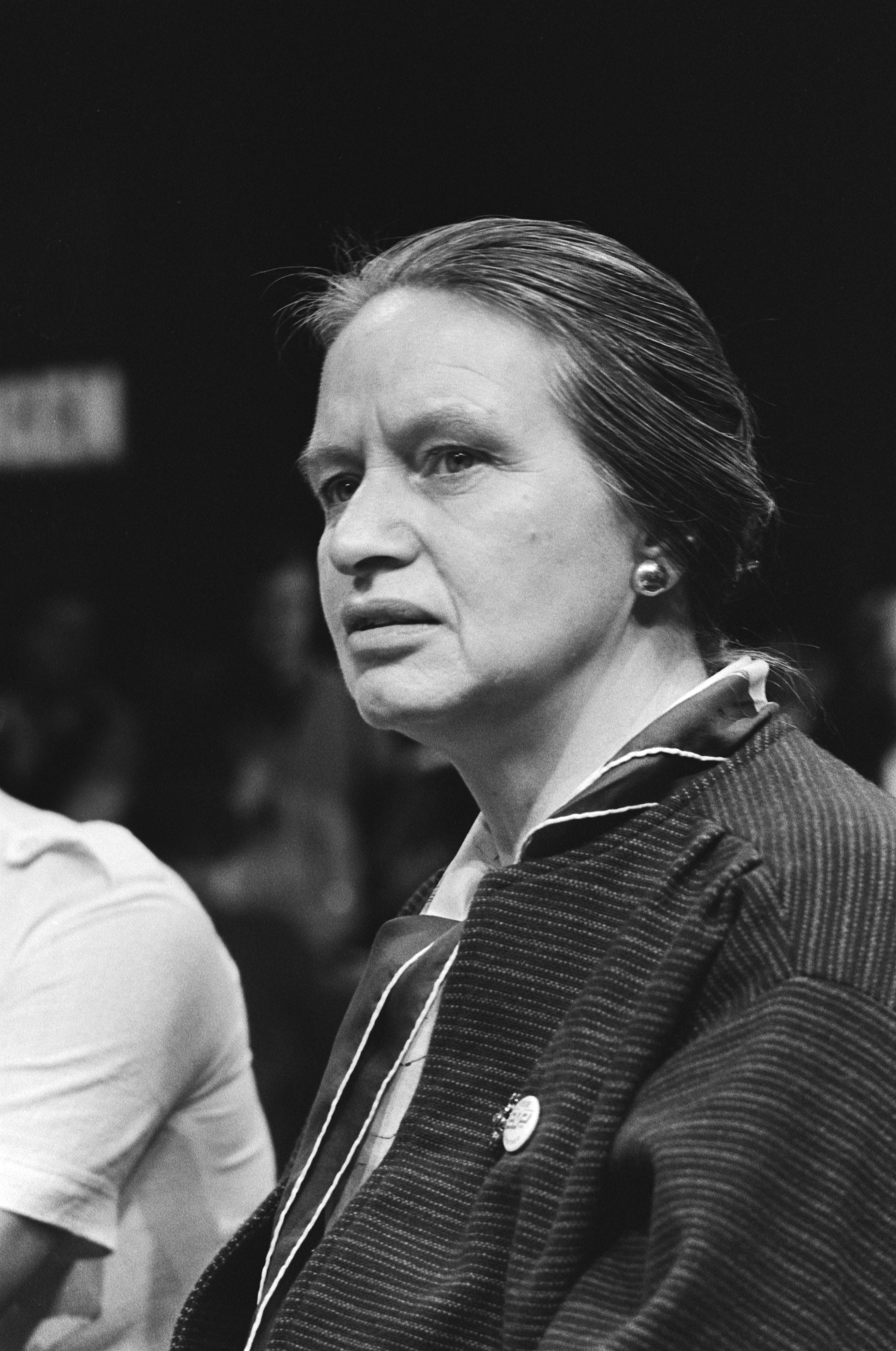
- Cathy Ubels-Veen in 1982

Member of the House of Representatives
- In office 16 September 1982 – 3 June 1986

Personal details
- Born: 28 October 1928 Kampen, Netherlands
- Died: 17 February 2015 (aged 86) Amsterdam, Netherlands
- Party: Anti-Revolutionary Party (1975–1980), Christian Democratic Appeal (1980–1982), Evangelical People's Party (1982–1989)
- Education: VU University Amsterdam

Catharina "Cathy" Ubels-Veen (28 October 1928 – 17 February 2015) was a Dutch politician. She was a member of the House of Representatives of the Netherlands between 1982 and 1986 for the Evangelical People's Party.

== Career ==
Veen was born in Kampen on 28 October 1928. In 1959 she married S. Ubels and from then on went with the name Ubels-Veen. She went to school in Amsterdam, where she also obtained an academic degree in sociology at the VU University Amsterdam around 1960.

In 1975 Ubels-Veen became member of the municipal council of Dokkum for the Anti-Revolutionary Party. In 1980 this party merged into the Christian Democratic Appeal. In 1982 Ubels-Veen's membership of the municipal council ended. She left both the municipal council as well as the Christian Democratic Appeal due to its policy on nuclear weapons. In the 1982 general election she obtained a seat in the House of Representatives for the Evangelical People's Party, which had separated from the Christian Democratic Appeal. Ubels-Veen was the sole representative of the party in the House. She opposed the placement of nuclear weapons of the United States in the Netherlands. In 1985 during protests over the proposed placement of Tomahawk missiles on Dutch territory Ubels-Veen called Dutch Prime Minister an indirect accomplice of genocide.

She died in Amsterdam on 17 February 2015.
