= Party chair =

Presiding officer of a political party

In politics, a party chair (often party chairperson/-man/-woman or party president) is the presiding officer of a political party. The nature and importance of the position differs from country to country, and also between political parties.

The role of a party chair is often quite different from that of a party leader. The duties of the chairman are typically concerned with the party membership as a whole, and the activities of the party organization. Chairs often play important roles in strategies to recruit and retain members, in campaign fundraising, and in internal party governance, where they may serve as a member of, or even preside over, a governing board or council. They often also have influence in candidate selections, and sometimes in the development and promulgation of party policy. When describing the position within the American Democratic Party, PBS NewsHour described it as "part cheerleader, part fundraiser, part organizer and recruiter, part public messenger".

Throughout the years party chair roles have changed as candidates create their own fundraising committees.

== Examples ==
=== Belgium ===
In Belgium, the top position of a political party is typically called its chairman (voorzitter/président), but its role is rather that of a party leader or even a combination of both. The party chairman/leader is the mightiest person within the party, controlling appointments etc. After the Prime Minister of Belgium the party chairmen are the most important figures in Belgian politics, sometimes characterized as a particracy. Following parliamentary elections, the party chairmen are the chief negotiators of the coalition agreement, and subsequently the chairman of the largest governing party typically becomes the Prime Minister and resigns as party chairman; he is replaced by a different chairman, usually interim. For example, PS chairman Elio Di Rupo became Prime Minister of the Di Rupo Government in 2011 and resumed the chairmanship in 2014 at the end of the government. He was replaced by Thierry Giet and Paul Magnette during this period.

Most major political parties elect their chairman by a vote of all the party's members. This practice was started by the Flemish liberal party in the 1990s.

=== India ===
The convenor of the ruling BJP led National Democratic Alliance is called the Chairperson. India's Home Minister Amit Shah holds the post.

=== China ===
The leader of Chinese Communist Party between 1943 and 1982 was the Chairman of the Chinese Communist Party. The post of chairman was abolished in 1982, and most of its functions were transferred to the revived post of General Secretary.

=== Malaysia ===
Usually in Malaysia, the term is used to refer any leader of a political coalition. The term 'president' in the other hand refer to a political party leader. Despite that, the role of a coalition chair is the same as party leader. The leader of the largest party within the coalition is usually will also be the chairperson of his or her alliance. However, this is not a requirement. For example, current President of People's Justice Party cum Prime Minister Anwar Ibrahim is also the Chairman of Pakatan Harapan despite his party is not the largest one in the coalition.

However, in a political party, there may still a title of Chairperson (often styled as Permanent Chairperson) exist in most of parties. It holds the highest ranking in any party posts. Despite that, the position is not the most powerful within the party as the President still holds its power.

=== Netherlands ===
In the Netherlands, in contrast to Belgium, the chairs are relatively weak, due to a separation of powers and are more akin to administrators. The chairs of political parties merely control the party organization, the bureau, and its finances, while the political leader, often the parliamentary leader (fractievoorzitter) decides over the party's political course. Many party chairs go on to occupy more important posts. Ria Beckers for instance was chair of the Political Party of Radicals, before she became parliamentary leader and party leader. There is one important exception to the above picture: Jan Marijnissen, former political leader of the Socialist Party combined being political leader of its parliamentary party and chair of the party itself. In both smaller and newer parties. Both the party chair and the political leader is often not are occupied by the same person due to the size and the rapid organization of the party.

=== United Kingdom ===
In the United Kingdom the term may refer to the holder of the office of Chairman of the Conservative Party or to a senior member of the Labour Party (not to be confused with the other Chairman of the Labour Party who chairs the NEC or the Chairman of the Parliamentary Labour Party elected solely by Labour MPs). This title was given to Labour's Harriet Harman after she was elected Deputy Leader of the Labour Party in June 2007.

=== United States ===
The chairmen of the Democratic National Committee (DNC) and Republican National Committee (RNC) serve as the operational heads of their respective political party. In addition, each state and territory has their own Democratic and Republican Party which also have chairmen or chairwomen.

== See also ==
- Party leader
