= Ria Beckers =

Dutch politician (1938–2006)

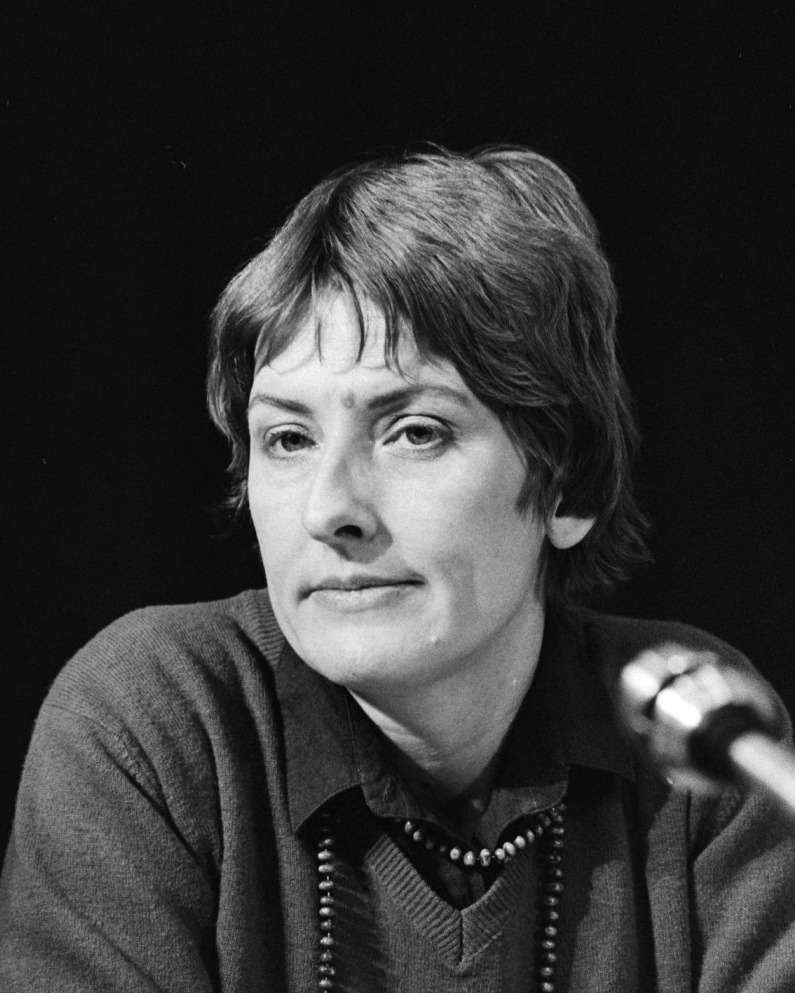
- Ria Beckers in 1981

Leader of GroenLinks
- In office 14 September 1989 – 20 April 1993
- Preceded by: Office established
- Succeeded by: Peter Lankhorst

Parliamentary leader in the House of Representatives
- In office 14 September 1989 – 20 April 1993
- Preceded by: Office established
- Succeeded by: Peter Lankhorst
- In office 25 May 1977 – 14 September 1989
- Preceded by: Bas de Gaay Fortman
- Succeeded by: Office discontinued

Leader of the Political Party of Radicals
- In office 25 May 1977 – 14 September 1989
- Preceded by: Bas de Gaay Fortman
- Succeeded by: Office discontinued

Member of the House of Representatives
- In office 8 June 1977 – 20 April 1993

Chairwoman of the Political Party of Radicals
- In office 30 November 1974 – 10 December 1976
- Leader: Bas de Gaay Fortman
- Preceded by: Wouter van Dam
- Succeeded by: Herman Verbeek

Personal details
- Born: Maria Brigitta Catherina de Bruijn; 2 November 1938 Driebergen, Netherlands
- Died: 22 March 2006 (aged 67) Wadenoijen, Netherlands
- Cause of death: Terminal illness
- Party: GroenLinks (from 1989)
- Other political affiliations: Political Party of Radicals (1970–1989)
- Spouse: Karel Beckers (m. 1965)
- Children: 2 daughters and 1 son
- Education: Utrecht University (Bachelor of Letters, Master of Letters)
- Occupation: Politician · Teacher · Nonprofit director · Academic administrator · Activist

Maria Brigitta Catherina "Ria" Beckers-de Bruijn (2 November 1938 – 22 March 2006) was a Dutch politician of the Political Party of Radicals (PPR) and later co-founder of the GroenLinks (GL) party and teacher.

== Career before politics ==
In 1956, Beckers completed the gymnasium, in which she took all courses and did not major in either sciences or arts. She continued to study Latin and Greek at the University of Utrecht. From 1962 she taught these languages at high schools in Haarlem and Leiden. Her thesis concerned the position of women in Greek Tragedy.

In the 1970s she had become active in the progressive Christian political party Politieke Partij Radicalen (PPR). Beckers had a Catholic background. She became a member of the PPR board in 1973 as vice-chairperson. In 1974 she was elected chairperson of the PPR.

== Political career ==
In 1977, Beckers was elected lijsttrekker of the PPR. This was remarkable because she was not a member of parliament at the time. The young Beckers was expected to perform better under young voters than the then political leader Bas de Gaay Fortman. She was the first female lijsttrekker in Dutch politics. In the 1977 elections the PPR lost four of its seven seats. Beckers nonetheless remained political leader and led the PPR in the 1981, 1982 and 1986 elections. In these elections the party got between two and three seats. Under her leadership the PPR broke its links with the PvdA and oriented itself to the more left-wing parties PSP, CPN and EVP. The PPR was no longer interested in governing but instead chose to testify to its ideals.

In 1989, the PPR merged with these left-wing parties to become the GroenLinks. Beckers was elected lijsttrekker of the new formation. In the 1989 elections the GroenLinks got a disappointing six seats. Beckers remained political leader of the GroenLinks until 1993, when she stood down for a new generation. She had been political leader of her party for sixteen years. When she left parliament in 1993 prime-minister Lubbers praised her by saying "you gave us (the government) a lot of trouble".

In parliament Beckers took special interest in promoting organic farming and peace.

== Later career ==
After leaving politics Beckers became involved in green NGOs: she was chairperson of the Platform Biologica, which promotes organic agriculture, from 1993 to 2004. She was chairperson the Foundation for Nature and the Environment since 1994 for ten years. After she left these positions in 2004 she was made Officer in the Order of Orange Nassau. After that she held several positions in advisory boards, for instance of the green Triodos-bank and Research Centre of Wageningen University.

In 2006, Beckers died after a long illness. After her death she was praised for being an authentic, compassionate and idealistic politician, who stood far from the televised political theater of today.

== Personal life ==
Beckers was married and had three children, one of whom was adopted.

Beckers lived most of her life in Wadenoijen, which is near the Linge river. For years she protested against the creation of bigger dikes against the river. Ironically, in 1995, she had to be evacuated from her house, because the dikes were expected to be not strong enough to hold back the river.

== Decorations ==
Honours
Ribbon bar	Honour	Country	Date	Comment
	Knight of the Order of the Netherlands Lion	Netherlands	30 April 1989	
	Officer of the Order of Orange-Nassau	Netherlands	30 April 2004	

Party political offices
Preceded by Wouter van Dam	Chairwoman of the Political; Party of Radicals; 1974–1976	Succeeded by Herman Verbeek
Preceded by Bas de Gaay Fortman	Lijsttrekker of the Political Party of Radicals; 1977, 1981, 1982, 1986	Party merged into GroenLinks
Preceded by Bas de Gaay Fortman	Leader of the Political; Party of Radicals; 1977–1989	Party merged into GroenLinks
Preceded by Bas de Gaay Fortman	Parliamentary leader of the Political Party of Radicals in the House of Representatives; 1977–1989	Party merged into GroenLinks
New political party	Lijsttrekker of GroenLinks; 1989	Succeeded by Ina Brouwer
New political party	Leader of GroenLinks; 1989–1993	Succeeded by Peter Lankhorst
New political party	Parliamentary leader of GroenLinks in the House of Representatives; 1989–1993	Succeeded by Peter Lankhorst
