= Hans Wiebenga =

Dutch politician (1917-2005)

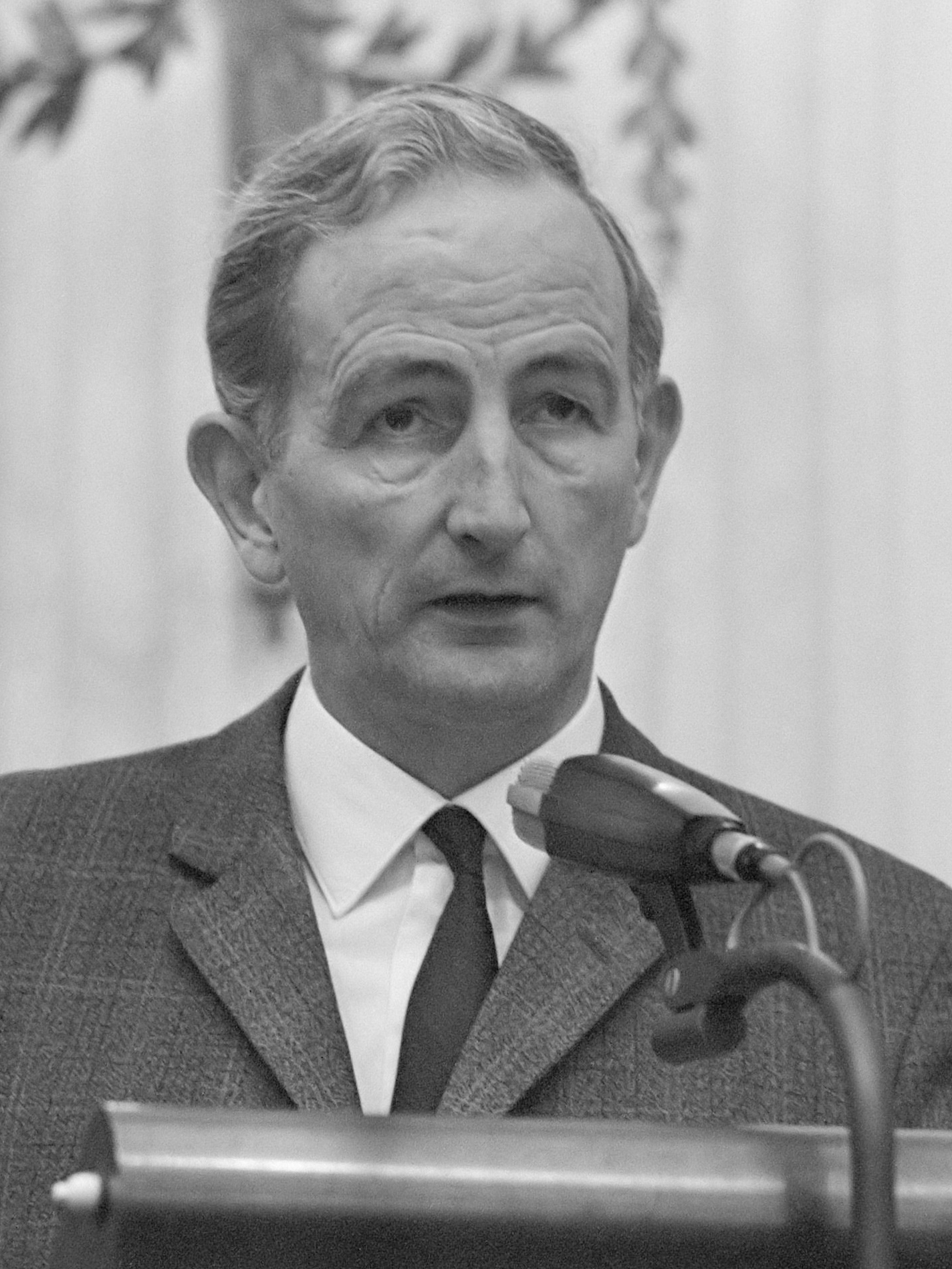
- Hans Wiebenga in 1970

Member of the House of Representatives
- In office 23 February 1967 – 7 December 1972

Personal details
- Born: 19 March 1917 Rotterdam
- Died: 27 March 2005 (aged 88) Arnhem
- Party: PSP (1959-1978)
- Other political affiliations: PvdA (1946-1947); Pacifist Socialist Party '92
- Education: Netherlands School of Economics

Hans Wiebenga (19 March 1917 – 27 March 2005) was a Dutch teacher and politician. From 1967 to 1972, he was a member of the House of Representatives as a member of the Pacifist Socialist Party (PSP), serving as the PSP's parliamentary leader from 1969 to 1972.

== Biography ==
Hans Wiebenga was born on 19 March 1917 in Rotterdam. After finishing his studies in economics at the Netherlands School for Economics in 1941, he became a teacher in Bloemendaal until 1959 and in Zeist from 1959 to 1967. He was a member of the Labour Party (PvdA) for a year before leaving in 1947 due to disagreements over the PvdA's support of the Police Actions in Indonesia.

In 1959, Wiebenga joined the PSP's party executive, becoming the party's vice chairman in 1961 and chairman in 1965. During this time, he was highly active in the Dutch peace movement. He was first elected to the House of Representatives in the 1967 Dutch general election. As an MP, he mainly focused on internal affairs, justice, and financial matters.

In 1969, Wiebenga became the PSP's parliamentary leader, and was its figurehead for the 1971 general election. In 1972, however, he was replaced by Bram van der Lek as party leader, who was considered a more youthful face within the party. He left the House of Representatives that same year, and the PSP as a whole in 1978.

After leaving office, he returned to Bloemendaal to resume his post as teacher, and became a vice principal until his retirement in 1980, and took up leadership positions in various peace movements and groups opposing the placing of American cruise missiles in the Netherlands. He served on the municipal council of Bloemendaal between 1974 and 1975. He ran for the House of Representatives again in the 1994 Dutch general election on the party list of the Pacifist Socialist Party '92, a splinter group that had opposed the original PSP's merger into GroenLinks, but was not elected.

Hans Wiebenga died on 27 March 2005 in Arnhem.
