= Jacques Aarden =

Dutch politician (1914–1997)

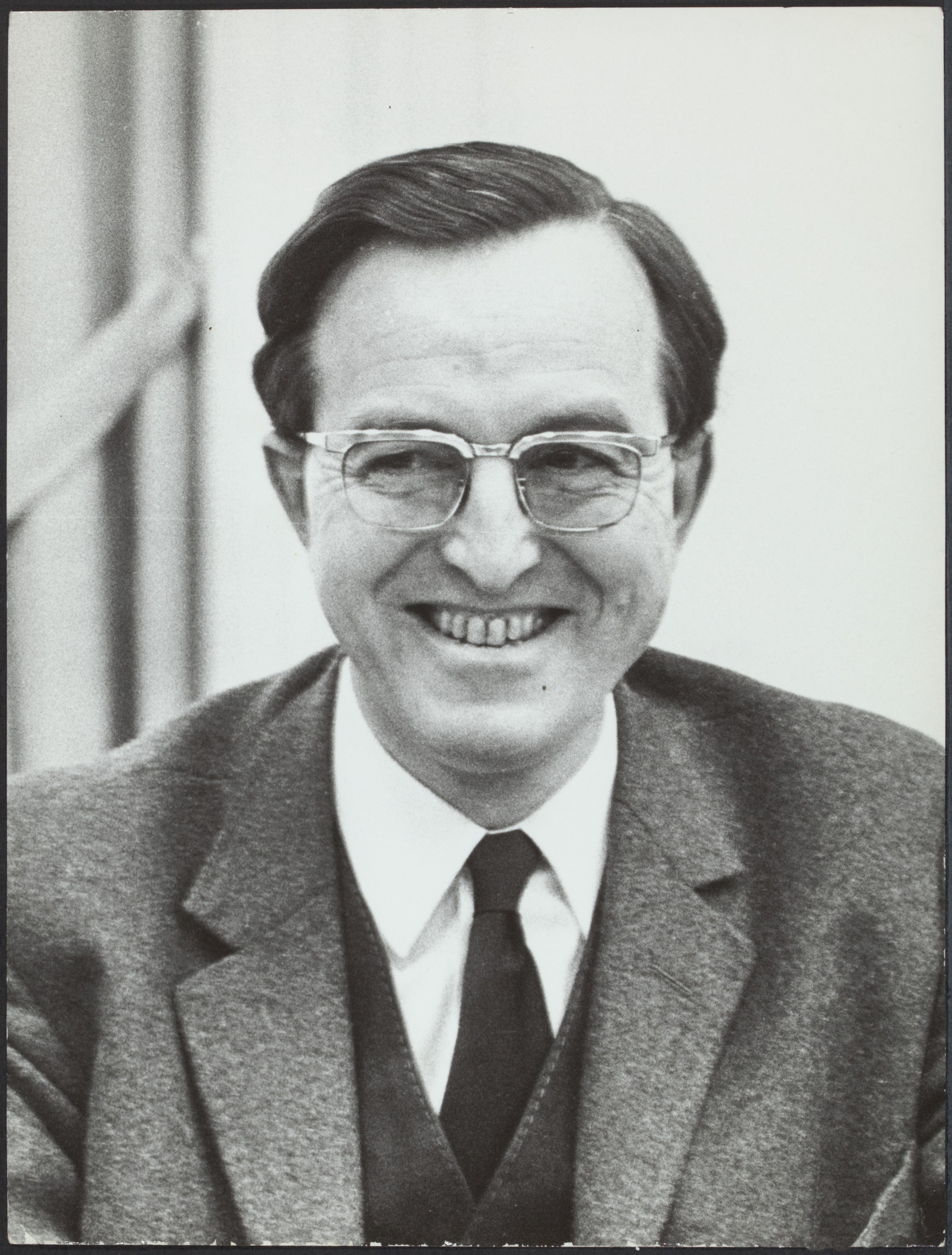

Member of the Council of State
- In office 1973–1984

Party leader of the PPR
- In office 1968–1972

Leader of the PPR in the House of Representatives
- In office 1971–1972

Leader of group-Aarden in the House of Representatives
- In office 1968–1971

Member of the House of Representatives
- In office 1962–1972

Member of the municipal council of Voorburg
- In office 1946–1966

Personal details
- Born: Jacobus Maria Aarden; 11 August 1914 Terheijden, Netherlands
- Died: 23 November 1997 (aged 83) Voorburg, Netherlands
- Party: Political Party of Radicals (1971–1984)
- Other political affiliations: Group-Aarden (1968–1971) Catholic People's Party (1945–1968)
- Occupation: Politician

Jacobus Maria "Jacques" Aarden (11 August 1914 – 23 November 1997) was a Dutch politician.

== Career ==
In 1940, Aarden finished his education in economics. After the Second World War he joined the new Catholic People's Party, even though he also considered joining the Labour Party. He became a member of the municipal council in Voorburg in 1946, a position he would hold for 20 years. On 12 July 1962 he joined the House of Representatives. He often voted in favour of pieces of left-progressive legislation, unlike most of his party. Tensions in the Catholic People's Party caused the so-called ‘Night of Schmelzer’ which ended the KVP-ARP-Labour Cals cabinet. When the party began drifting towards cooperation with Freedom and Democracy instead of the liberal People's Party Aarden and his allies responded by writing an address. He refused to cooperate with the rightist De Jong cabinet. When the KVP unexpectedly declared its intention to work together closely with the ARP and Christian Historical Union Aarden and his ‘radicals’ left the KVP (26 February 1968). Aarden and his followers created the group-Aarden which he would lead until 1971. Group Aarden merged with elements from the ARP and CHU to create the leftist Political Party of Radicals, Aarden became its leader. After the 1971 election only Aarden en de Gaay Fortman gained positions in the House of Representatives. After a period of absence due to overwork Aarden got a position in the Council of State in 1973. On 1 September 1984 he left politics.

== Personal life ==
Religiously he was among the more traditional Catholics. He took a special interest in the veneration of Mary.

His father was Petrus Jacobus Maria Aarden. He married Maria Pietronella Philomena Korst and had four sons and four daughters with her.
