= De Gaay Fortman =

de Gaay Fortman is a Dutch surname. Notable people with the surname include:

- Bas de Gaay Fortman, Dutch politician and diplomat
- Gaius de Gaay Fortman, Dutch jurist and politician

== See also ==
- List of Dutch patrician families
