= Political Party of Radicals =

Political Party of Radicals Politieke Partij Radikalen
- Abbreviation: PPR
- Leader: Jacques Aarden (1968–1972); Bas de Gaay Fortman (1972–1977); Ria Beckers (1977–1989)
- Chairperson: Pieter Bogaers (1968–1969); Bram van Ojik (1988–1990)
- Founders: Jacques Aarden; Pieter Bogaers; Harry van Doorn; Annie Kessel; Paul Janssen
- Founded: 27 April 1968; 58 years ago
- Dissolved: 16 February 1991; 35 years ago
- Split from: Catholic People's Party
- Merged into: GroenLinks
- Headquarters: The Hague
- Youth wing: Politieke Partij Radikalen jongeren
- Think tank: Centrum voor Staatkundige Vorming
- Ideology: Christian left Green politics Progressivism; New Left
- Political position: Left-wing
- National affiliation: Rainbow (1989–1990)
- European Parliament group: Rainbow Group
- Colours: Green (customary)

The Political Party of Radicals (Dutch: Politieke Partij Radikalen, PPR) was a progressive Christian (radicaal-christelijke) and green political party in the Netherlands. The PPR played a relatively small role in Dutch politics and merged with other left-wing parties to form GroenLinks in 1991.

== History ==
=== Before 1968 ===
The foundation of the PPR is linked to the formation of the De Jong cabinet and the Christian Democratic Appeal (CDA).

After the 1967 general election, it became clear that a centre-right cabinet would be formed by the Anti-Revolutionary Party (ARP) and Christian Historical Union (CHU), the Catholic People's Party (KVP) and the People's Party for Freedom and Democracy (VVD). Progressive forces within the KVP and ARP had hoped for the formation of a centre-left cabinet with the Labour Party (PvdA) without the participation of the CHU and the VVD.

In March 1967, a group of "regret voters" (ARP members who regretted voting ARP) published an advertisement in the Protestant newspaper Trouw, aimed at the leadership of the party. They claimed that the left-wing, so called evangelisch-radicaal, ideal of the ARP could not be realised in a cabinet with the VVD. In April, the group began to meet regularly with dissidents from the KVP in the Hotel Americain, which gave the group the name "Americain Group". The group included Wilhelm de Gaay Fortman, prominent ARP politician, his son Bas de Gaay Fortman, Jo Cals, former KVP prime minister, and Ruud Lubbers, member of the KVP and future prime minister. In May, the group became a formal organisation, the Working Group Christian Radicals, which was oriented at making their mother parties more progressive. They had some success in the KVP, which was seeking new allies and a new image, after it had lost the 1967 general election.

In February 1968, the leaders of the KVP, Norbert Schmelzer, ARP, Barend Biesheuvel and CHU, Jur Mellema made a public appearance, stating that the three parties wanted to work together more closely. The cooperation would eventually lead to the formation of the Christian Democratic Appeal (CDA) in 1974. With that appearance, the hopes of the Christian Radicals within the KVP that a progressive alliance with the Labour Party would be formed were shattered.

=== 1968–1977 ===
Poster for the 1974 elections showing the green nature of the party

On 27 April 1968, part of the group of Catholic radicals left the KVP and formed the Political Party of Radicals (PRP). Prominent radicals, like Lubbers and Cals, did not join the party. A group of three radical KVP MPs led by Jacques Aarden left the KVP parliamentary party and formed their own group-Aarden, the parliamentary party of the PPR. The party is joined by some prominent "regret-voters" from the ARP, most prominently Bas de Gaay Fortman.

The party began to cooperate closely with the Labour Party (PvdA), the newly founded Democrats 66 (D66) and initially with the left-wing Pacifist Socialist Party (PSP) in the so-called Progressive Accords (PAK). The parties proposed common election manifestos and formed the Den Uyl shadow cabinet. The PSP left the alliance before the negotiations ended, because the alliance was not socialist enough. The PPR participated in the 1971 general election as part of the PAK. The PPR won only two seats, while the PAK as a whole won only 52 seats, a third of parliament. Jacques Aarden led the party in parliament. Some prominent members left the PPR, because they thought the party had failed. The first Biesheuvel cabinet was formed by the ARP, KVP, CHU, VVD and the Democratic Socialists '70.

In the 1972 general election, the parties tried again. The PAK now won 56 seats and the PPR 7. Former ARP politician Bas de Gaay Fortman led the party in the elections. A continuation of the first Biesheuvel cabinet, which fell within one year was excluded. The only possibility was a centre-left government with the PAK parties and the Christian democratic parties. The PAK parties refused this possibility and wanted to form a PAK minority cabinet. A compromise was found in the progressive Den Uyl cabinet, an extraparliamentary cabinet comprising PvdA, D66 and PPR and progressive individuals from the ARP and the KVP, including former Radicals such as Lubbers and Wilhelm de Gaay Fortman. The PPR supplied two ministers, Harry van Doorn as Minister for Culture, Recreation and Social Work, and Boy Trip as Minister without Portfolio for Science, as well as one state secretary, Michel van Hulten, for Transport, Public Works and Water Management. The fact that the PPR was cooperating with the ARP and KVP, which many members of the party had just left, led to considerable upheaval within the party. The party convention adopted a resolution stating that the party would not cooperate with these parties in the next cabinet.

=== 1977–1989 ===
Poster for the 1986 elections showing party leader Ria Beckers in front of the 1983 anti-nuclear weapons demonstration

Before the 1977 elections, Bas de Gaay Fortman was replaced as political leader by Ria Beckers. The election results were especially disastrous: the party lost four seats. This was attributed to the political competition between PvdA Prime Minister Joop den Uyl and his Christian Democrat competitor Dries van Agt, which caused many PPR sympathisers to vote for Den Uyl, and also the anti-KVP/ARP resolution adopted by the convention, which made serious participation in cabinet impossible.

In 1979, following the first direct election to the European Parliament, the PRP was involved with the Coordination of European Green and Radical Parties (CEGRP) and its unsuccessful efforts to create a single pan-European platform for green and radical politics.

In the early 1980s, the placement of American nuclear weapons became an important political issue. The PPR was involved in the organisation of national demonstrations against nuclear weapons and more than 80% of the members of the PPR attended one of the two mass protests against the placement nuclear weapons of 1981 and 1983.

The party began to debate its political course: some members (known as the Godebald-group) wanted to continue cooperation with the PvdA. Many of the party's founders and former ministers, such as Erik Jurgens were part of this group. Others wanted to cooperate with the Pacifist Socialist Party and the Communist Party of the Netherlands. They were called the Wageningen Group. Another group wanted to reform the party's course and continue as an independent green party: Bas de Gaay Fortman and former Provo and Kabouter Roel van Duijn were important exponents of this group. At the party convention of 1981, the party voted on these options, which were colour-coded: the Red option (cooperation with the PSP and CPN), the Blue option (cooperation with D66 and the PvdA) and the Green option (independent green party). An alliance was struck between the Reds and Greens. The party decided to break its alliance with D66 and the PvdA and try to form an alliance with the PSP and CPN, which would have a strong green identity. In the 1981 general election it kept its three seats. After the election a CDA–PvdA–D66 cabinet was formed – a continuation of the Den Uyl cabinet without the PPR. The cabinet fell after several months in the subsequent 1982 election where the party lost one seat. In 1985 CDA dissident Stef Dijkman joined the PPR parliamentary party. He had split from the CDA in 1983 together with Nico Sholten, who joined the PvdA parliamentary party.

In the 1980s, the cooperation between PPR, CPN and PSP began to take shape. The parties cooperated mainly in municipal and provincial elections and councils, because a higher percentage of votes is necessary to gain seats in such elections. The three parties contested the 1984 European Parliament election with a combined candidate list with the name Green Progressive Accord. They won one seat, which rotated between the PSP and PPR. Party members also met each other in grassroots extraparliamentary protest against nuclear power and nuclear weapons. Both the PSP and CPN were unwilling to cooperate intensively with the PPR, which was slightly larger in seats and which they saw as a non-socialist party.

=== After 1989 ===
In 1989, the PSP initiated talks with the PPR and the PSP. Their initiative was supported by an open letter from members of trade unions, environmental movements and the arts which called for one progressive formation to the left of the PvdA. After long negotiations, which were pressured by the fall of the second Lubbers cabinet and the subsequent earlier elections, the party entered in the 1989 general election as part of GroenLinks. They were joined by the Evangelical People's Party (EVP). Ria Beckers was lead candidate and she became chair of the GroenLinks parliamentary party. In 1991 the PPR dissolved itself into GroenLinks when GroenLinks became a formal political party. In the same year, GroenLinks' only MEP, former PPR-chair, Verbeek announced that he would not give up his seat in the European Parliament, to allow a former member of the PSP to enter the European Parliament. He would continue as an independent and would be lead candidate for The Greens in the 1994 European election, without success.

The PPR left a considerable mark on GroenLinks. In particular the green, environmentalist ideals of the PPR still play an important role.

== Name ==
The name "Political Party of Radicals" referenced the origin of the party, it was founded by the so-called Christian Radicals: progressive Catholics. Because they wanted to open their party to all Christians as well as to non-Christians, they dropped the reference to Christianity in their name.

== Ideology and issues ==
The party did not have a manifesto of principles, instead election manifestos which addressed current issues guided the party's behaviour.

Although the party had Christian roots, it denounced a direct relationship between religion and politics. The party can be seen as an early green party with a post-materialist agenda consisting of environmental protection, third world development, nuclear disarmament, democratisation of the economy and grass roots democracy. The party favoured the implementation of a basic income.

During its existence, the party changed from a Christian ally of the Labour Party (PvdA) with its roots in the Catholic trade union movement to a party on the left of the PvdA with links to the environmental movement. Several decisions were important in this, but especially the 1981 congress in which the party decided not to cooperate, but try to found a political alliance left of the PvdA with a green program.

== Election results ==
=== House of Representatives ===
Election	Lead candidate	Votes	%	Seats	+/–	Government
1971	various (Note: Including Jacques Aarden and Bas de Gaay Fortman.)	116,065	1.8	2 / 150	New	Opposition
1972	Bas de Gaay Fortman	354,829	4.8	7 / 150	▲5	In government
1977	Ria Beckers	140,910	1.7	3 / 150	▼4	Opposition
1981	Ria Beckers	171,042	2.0	3 / 150	0	Opposition
1982	Ria Beckers	136,446	1.7	2 / 150	▼1	Opposition
1986	Ria Beckers	115,203	1.3	2 / 150	0	Opposition

== Representation ==
This table the PPR's results in elections to the Senate, European Parliament and States-Provincial, as well as the party's political leadership: the fractievoorzitter, is the chair of the parliamentary party and the lijsttrekker is the party's top candidate in the general election, these posts are normally taken by the party's leader. It also possible that the leader of the PPR is a member of cabinet, therefore its participation in cabinets is also listed: if the PPR was in cabinet the highest ranking minister is listed. The membership of PPR and the party chair is also represented.

Year	S	EP	PS	Parliamentary leader	Party chair	Membership
1968	0	n/a	0	Jacques Aarden	Pieter Bogaers	2000
1969	1	n/a	0	Jacques Aarden	Erik Jurgens	3000
1970	1	n/a	9+9*	Jacques Aarden	J.J.G Tonnaer	4000
1971	2	n/a	9+9*	Jacques Aarden	D. Coppes	4284
1972	2	n/a	9+9*	Bas de Gaay Fortman	D. Coppes	3800
1973	2	n/a	9+9*	Bas de Gaay Fortman	W. van Dam	6300
1974	4	n/a	32+2*	Bas de Gaay Fortman	Ria Beckers	11000
1975	4	n/a	32+2*	Bas de Gaay Fortman	Ria Beckers	12800
1976	4	n/a	32+2*	Bas de Gaay Fortman	Ria Beckers	131000
1977	5	n/a	32+2*	Ria Beckers	Herman Verbeek	134000
1978	5	n/a	6+2*	Ria Beckers	Herman Verbeek	12600
1979	5	n/a	6+2*	Ria Beckers	Herman Verbeek	12325
1980	3	n/a	6+2*	Ria Beckers	Herman Verbeek	11500
1981	1	n/a	6+2*	Ria Beckers	Wim de Boer	11567
1982	1	n/a	11+1*+3**	Ria Beckers	Wim de Boer	11063
1983	1	n/a	11+1*+3**	Ria Beckers	Wim de Boer	8934
1984	1	1**	11+1*+3**	Ria Beckers	Wim de Boer	8305
1985	1	1**	11+1*+3**	Ria Beckers	J. van der Plaat	7848
1986	2	1**	11+1*+4**	Ria Beckers	J. van der Plaat	6151
1987	1	0**	10+3**	Ria Beckers	J. van der Plaat	5901
1988	1	0**	10+3**	Ria Beckers	Bram van Ojik	5785
1989	1***	1***	13***	Ria Beckers leader of GroenLinks	Bram van Ojik	5823
1990	1***	1***	13***	Ria Beckers	Bram van Ojik	unknown

*: elected on combined PvdA/PPR lists (estimate). **: elected on combined PPR/CPN/PSP or PPR/PSP lists (estimate). ***: cooperating in GroenLinks parliamentary parties.

=== European Parliament ===
Name	Start of term	End of term	Ref.
Henk Waltmans	16 September 1976	17 October 1977	
Herman Verbeek	24 July 1984	15 December 1986	
Herman Verbeek	25 July 1989	19 July 1994	

=== Municipal and provincial government ===
The PPR supplied several municipal and provincial councillors. In the 1970s it also cooperated in the North Holland provincial executive and in several local executives such as Amsterdam.

In the following figure one can see the election results of the provincial election of 1982 per province. It shows that the support for the party was distributed equally throughout the country, with a slight tendency to the West (North, Utrecht and South Holland) and South (Brabant and Limburg).

Province	Result (seats)
Groningen	1
Friesland	1**
Drenthe	1**
Overijssel	1
Gelderland	2
Utrecht	1*
North Holland	2
South Holland	2**
Zeeland	1
North Brabant	1
Limburg	2

*: elected on combined PvdA/PPR lists (estimate). **: elected on combined PPR/CPN/PSP or PPR/PSP lists (estimate).

== Electorate ==
The PPRs electorate consisted of young, well educated voters, who often had a Catholic or Protestant background. The electorate was slightly more concentrated in the West (North, Utrecht and South Holland) and South (Brabant and Limburg).

== Organisation ==
=== Organisational structure ===
The highest organ of the PPR was the party convention, which convened once a year. It appointed the party board, decided the order of candidates on candidate lists for the House of Representatives, Senate and European Parliament and had the final say over the party programme.

=== Linked organisations ===
The PPR published its own magazine which was called Radicals Paper (Dutch: Radikalenkrant) between 1968 and 1973 and 1982 and 1990 and PPR Action Paper (Dutch: PPR aktiekrant; PPRAK) between 1973 and 1981.

The PPR's youth was organised in the Political Party of Radicals Youth (Dutch: Politieke Partij Radicalen Jeugd; PPRJ). In 1991 the PPRJ merged into DWARS GroenLinks youth.

In the 1980s the scientific institute of the PPR cooperated strongly with the scientific institutes of the PSP and CPN. They published De Helling together since 1987. The Rode Draad was published since 1985, which was a magazine for municipal and provincial councillors of both the PSP, PPR and CPN.

=== International cooperation ===
Since 1979 the party cooperated with other green and left-wing parties in organisations like Grael, which later became the European Green Party.

=== Relationships to other parties ===
Cooperation was an important theme for the PPR as the party was founded as a party of left-wing Christians who wanted to cooperate with the PvdA, which later became committed to forming a political alliance left of the PvdA.

Between 1971 and 1977 the relations with PvdA and Democrats 66 were especially close. The three parties formed the core of the Den Uyl cabinet. After the elections of 1977, when the PPR lost a lot of seats, and 1981 when the PPR was excluded from the second Van Agt cabinet.

The relations with the CPN and PSP started out badly, as the CPN and the PSP saw the party as a reformist, non-socialist party. After 1981, when the PPR had committed itself to extraparliamentary protest, the relations with the reforming CPN and PSP became better. In 1989 this resulted in the formation of GroenLinks.

== Logos ==
Logos of the Political Party of Radicals
Logo the party from 1970 to 1979

Logo of the party from 1979 to 1986

== See also ==
- Rainbow (Netherlands)
