= New Middle Party =

Dutch political party

The New Middle Party (in Dutch: Nieuwe Midden Partij, NMP) is a Dutch small business-interest political party. The NMP was a marginal party and was only successful during the 1971 Dutch general election.

== History ==
The NMP was founded in 1970, then named the Dutch Middle Class Party (Nederlandse Middenstands Partij). It entered in the 1971 elections, and won two seats. Several months after the elections one of its MPs, De Jong, came into conflict with the party's chair, Te Pas, because he was involved in lawsuits over corruption. De Jong continued as independent MP. In the 1972 election the party won no seats.

In 1995, the party was revived by Martin Dessing, and competed in the 1998 Dutch general election, gaining only 23,512 votes (0.27%) and 0 seats. The party was renamed to the New Middle Party, and unsuccessfully competed in the 2002 election.

== Name ==
The party saw itself as the continuation of the pre-war Middle Class Party, as such it styled itself as "New Middle Class Party" or "New Middle Party".

== Ideology & Issues ==
The NMP was a party for businesspeople and shopkeepers, and also appealed to 'forgotten groups' like the elderly, unmarried and disabled. It wants to spread taxes and benefits more equally between social groups. It was fiscally conservative and sought to reduce bureaucracy and government debt. Meanwhile, it wantes to protect the value of old age pensions and increase spending on healthcare. Furthermore, it wanted to end "car bullying", that is taxes on petrol, driven kilometers and car-purchases. It advocated limited migration into the EU and cutting spending on development cooperation.

== Representation ==
This table show the NMP's results in elections to the House of Representatives and Senate, as well as the party's political leadership: the fractievoorzitter, is the chair of the parliamentary party and the lijsttrekker is the party's top candidate in the general election, these posts are normally taken by the party's leader.

| Year | HoR | S | Lijsttrekker | Fractievoorzitter |
|---|---|---|---|---|
| 1971 | 2 | 0 | Albert te Pas | Albert te Pas |

== Electorate ==
The NMP was supported in the 1971 elections by floating voters, especially those who supported a similar party, the Farmers' Party during the 1967 elections.
