= 1977 Dutch general election =

- 25 May 1977
- All 150 seats in the House of Representatives; 76 seats needed for a majority
- Turnout: 88.1% (▲4.6 pp)
Party	Leader	Vote %	Seats	+/–
PvdA	Joop den Uyl	33.8%	53	+10
CDA	Dries van Agt	31.9%	49	+1
VVD	Hans Wiegel	17.9%	28	+6
D'66	Jan Terlouw	5.4%	8	+2
SGP	Hette Abma	2.1%	3	0
CPN	Marcus Bakker	1.7%	2	−5
PPR	Ria Beckers	1.6%	3	−4
GPV	Bart Verbrugh	0.9%	1	−1
PSP	Bram van der Lek	0.9%	1	−1
BP	Hendrik Koekoek	0.8%	1	−2
DS'70	Willem Drees Jr.	0.7%	1	−5
This lists parties that won seats. See the complete results below.
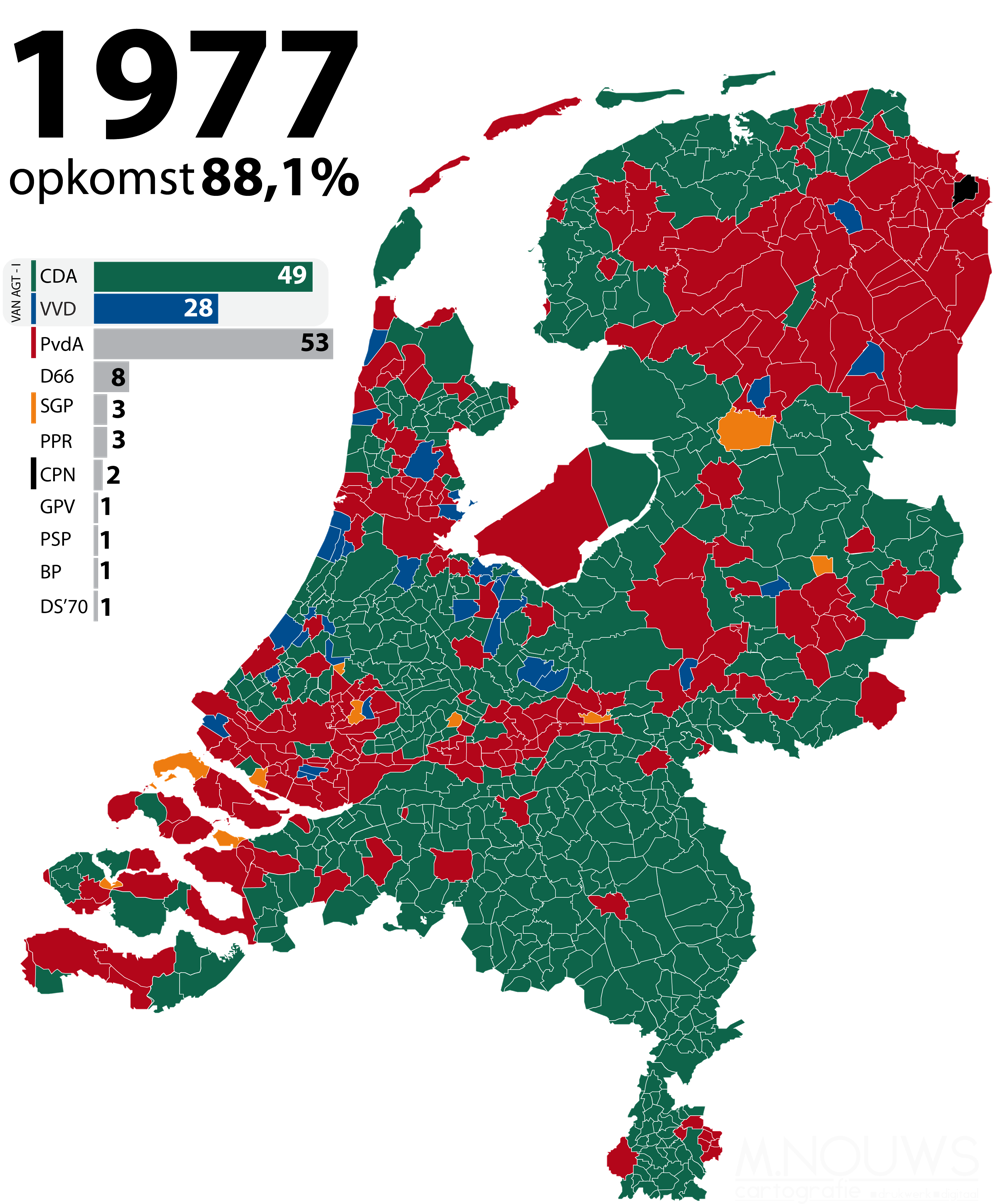
Most voted-for party by municipality
Cabinet before	Cabinet after
Den Uyl cabinet PvdA–KVP–ARP–D'66–PPR	First Van Agt cabinet CDA–VVD

General elections were held in the Netherlands on 25 May 1977. The Labour Party remained the largest party, winning 53 of the 150 seats in the House of Representatives. Following the election, it took 208 days of negotiations to form a new government. This was a European record for longest government formation that stood until after the 2010 Belgian general election. The Christian Democratic Appeal was formed by the Anti-Revolutionary Party (ARP), Christian Historical Union (CHU) and the Catholic People's Party (KVP) in 1976. The first joint party leader was a member of the KVP, Dries van Agt.

Eventually a coalition was formed during the 1977 Dutch cabinet formation between the Christian Democratic Appeal and the People's Party for Freedom and Democracy with Van Agt as Prime Minister.

== Results ==
Party	Votes	%	Seats	+/–
Labour Party	2,813,793	33.83	53	+10
Christian Democratic Appeal	2,652,278	31.89	49	+1
People's Party for Freedom and Democracy	1,492,689	17.95	28	+6
Democrats 66	452,423	5.44	8	+2
Reformed Political Party	177,010	2.13	3	0
Communist Party of the Netherlands	143,481	1.73	2	–5
Political Party of Radicals	140,910	1.69	3	–4
Reformed Political League	79,421	0.95	1	–1
Pacifist Socialist Party	77,972	0.94	1	–1
Farmers' Party	69,914	0.84	1	–2
Democratic Socialists '70	59,487	0.72	1	–5
Reformatory Political Federation	53,220	0.64	0	New
Dutch People's Union	33,434	0.40	0	New
Roman Catholic Party of the Netherlands	33,227	0.40	0	–1
Socialist Party	24,420	0.29	0	New
Federation of Elderly Parties of the Netherlands	4,379	0.05	0	New
Union Against Arbitrariness of Civil Servants	4,110	0.05	0	New
Communist Unity Movement of the Netherlands	2,649	0.03	0	New
Democratic Action Centre	2,150	0.03	0	New
Party of the Taxpayers	201	0.00	0	New
European Conservative Union	197	0.00	0	New
Jusia List	91	0.00	0	New
Dutch Middle Class Party	89	0.00	0	0
Griek List	67	0.00	0	New
Total	8,317,612	100.00	150	0
Valid votes	8,317,612	99.42		
Invalid/blank votes	48,217	0.58		
Total votes	8,365,829	100.00		
Registered voters/turnout	9,497,999	88.08		
Source: Kiesraad

=== By province ===
Results by province
Province	PvdA	CDA	VVD	D'66	SGP	CPN	PPR	GPV	PSP	BP	DS'70	Others
Drenthe	41.5	27.1	18.2	4.4	0.4	1.2	1.4	1.8	0.6	1.3	0.6	1.5
Friesland	37.3	37.4	12.3	4.4	0.9	1.5	1.3	1.6	0.8	0.6	0.6	1.3
Gelderland	30.8	35.5	17.2	4.8	3.7	0.6	1.7	0.7	0.9	1.4	0.5	2.2
Groningen	42.4	24.3	14.4	4.4	0.3	4.3	1.9	4.0	1.3	0.7	0.6	1.4
Limburg	30.1	44.6	14.7	3.3	0.1	1.1	1.9	0.1	0.7	1.0	0.4	2.0
North Brabant	28.8	43.7	15.7	5.0	0.5	0.6	1.6	0.2	0.8	1.1	0.5	1.5
North Holland	35.4	22.9	21.7	7.3	0.5	4.5	2.1	0.4	1.5	0.6	1.2	1.9
Overijssel	31.0	39.5	13.2	4.2	2.9	1.1	1.3	2.2	0.5	1.2	0.4	2.5
South Holland	37.9	24.6	19.9	6.1	3.8	1.3	1.5	0.8	0.8	0.4	0.9	2.0
Southern IJsselmeer Polders	33.1	29.0	18.9	6.7	1.0	2.9	2.8	1.3	0.6	0.6	0.7	2.4
Utrecht	28.2	30.5	22.1	6.6	3.2	0.9	1.9	1.6	1.3	0.7	0.7	2.3
Zeeland	32.6	29.8	17.3	4.4	8.4	0.4	1.5	1.6	0.5	1.0	0.6	1.9
