= 1971 Dutch general election =

- 28 April 1971
- All 150 seats in the House of Representatives; 76 seats needed for a majority
- Turnout: 79.12% (▼15.88pp)
Party	Leader	Vote %	Seats	+/–
PvdA	Joop den Uyl	24.60	39	+2
KVP	Gerard Veringa	21.84	35	−7
VVD	Molly Geertsema	10.34	16	−1
ARP	Barend Biesheuvel	8.59	13	−2
D'66	Hans van Mierlo	6.77	11	+4
CHU	Bé Udink	6.32	10	−2
DS'70	Willem Drees Jr.	5.33	8	New
CPN	Marcus Bakker	3.90	6	+1
SGP	Hette Abma	2.35	3	0
PPR	Jacques Aarden	1.84	2	New
GPV	Piet Jongeling	1.61	2	+1
NMP	Ab te Pas	1.51	2	New
PSP	Hans Wiebenga	1.44	2	−2
BP	Hendrik Koekoek	1.10	1	−6
This lists parties that won seats. See the complete results below.
Most voted-for party by municipality
Cabinet before	Cabinet after
De Jong cabinet KVP–VVD–ARP–CHU	First Biesheuvel cabinet KVP–VVD–ARP–CHU–DS'70

General elections were held in the Netherlands on 28 April 1971. The Labour Party (PvdA) emerged as the largest party, winning 39 of the 150 seats in the House of Representatives. The elections were the first without compulsory voting, causing a sharp fall in voter turnout, down to 79% from 95% in the 1967 elections. Barend Biesheuvel of the Anti-Revolutionary Party (ARP) became prime minister, leading the first Biesheuvel cabinet.

His cabinet contained a broad coalition of parties, with ministers from ARP, Christian Historical Union (both Protestant), the Catholic People's Party, the conservative-liberal People's Party for Freedom and Democracy and moderate socialist Democratic Socialists '70 (DS'70), which had just split off from the PvdA.

However, Biesheuvel's government was short-lived; following a decision to cut government spending, DS'70 withdrew from the government, causing it to lose its majority and fresh elections to be held after just a year and seven months.

== Results ==
Party	Votes	%	Seats	+/–
Labour Party	1,554,733	24.60	39	+2
Catholic People's Party	1,380,365	21.84	35	–7
People's Party for Freedom and Democracy	653,606	10.34	16	–1
Anti-Revolutionary Party	542,874	8.59	13	–2
Democrats 1966	428,150	6.77	11	+4
Christian Historical Union	399,164	6.32	10	–2
Democratic Socialists '70	336,788	5.33	8	New
Communist Party of the Netherlands	246,594	3.90	6	+1
Reformed Political Party	148,221	2.35	3	0
Political Party of Radicals	116,065	1.84	2	New
Reformed Political League	101,797	1.61	2	+1
New Middle Party	95,653	1.51	2	New
Pacifist Socialist Party	90,752	1.44	2	–2
Farmers' Party	69,678	1.10	1	–6
General Elderly Party of the Netherlands	26,881	0.43	0	New
Dutch Appeal	24,379	0.39	0	New
New Roman Catholic Party	23,061	0.36	0	New
Kabouters	21,988	0.35	0	New
Elderly and Labour Party	21,489	0.34	0	New
Binding Right	15,137	0.24	0	New
Democrats 2000	7,189	0.11	0	New
Elderly Party 65+	5,784	0.09	0	New
Van Velsen List	3,676	0.06	0	New
Elderly Party General Interest	1,843	0.03	0	New
Stichting Gedupeerde Groepen 18+ t/m 65+	1,648	0.03	0	New
Rural Party for the Elderly	1,620	0.03	0	New
Party of the Right	477	0.01	0	0
Positive Social Democrats	400	0.01	0	New
Total	6,320,012	100.00	150	0
Valid votes	6,320,012	99.27		
Invalid/blank votes	46,567	0.73		
Total votes	6,366,579	100.00		
Registered voters/turnout	8,046,969	79.12		
Source: Kiesraad

=== By province ===
Results by province
Province	PvdA	KVP	VVD	ARP	D'66	CHU	DS'70	CPN	SGP	PPR	GPV	NMP	PSP	BP	Others
Drenthe	35.6	5.9	13.5	14.3	4.3	8.8	3.9	4.0	0.4	0.8	2.8	1.9	0.7	1.5	1.7
Friesland	31.5	5.2	7.8	21.5	4.1	12.5	3.1	3.5	1.0	1.2	3.0	2.1	1.4	0.9	1.3
Gelderland	24.2	22.1	10.0	8.5	5.5	9.5	4.8	1.2	4.0	1.6	1.4	1.8	1.1	1.7	2.8
Groningen	31.8	4.1	10.8	15.4	4.1	6.7	4.1	11.0	0.3	1.3	5.2	1.5	1.5	0.8	1.4
Limburg	14.6	54.2	5.2	1.6	7.3	0.7	4.3	2.4	0.1	2.4	0.2	1.1	1.1	1.5	3.5
North Brabant	14.2	49.3	7.1	3.4	6.9	1.9	4.1	1.5	0.6	2.7	0.4	1.5	1.3	2.0	3.1
North Holland	25.2	16.0	12.2	6.4	8.5	3.6	7.7	9.0	0.6	2.3	0.9	1.5	2.4	0.7	2.9
Overijssel	23.8	23.0	8.0	9.7	4.8	10.7	4.0	2.9	3.2	1.2	3.0	1.7	0.9	1.6	1.6
South Holland	29.8	12.4	12.2	9.7	8.2	6.8	5.6	3.0	4.0	1.4	1.5	1.3	1.3	0.5	2.3
Southern IJsselmeer Polders	19.2	13.8	12.6	18.6	7.3	10.5	5.9	1.5	1.7	2.8	3.1	0.4	1.2	0.5	0.9
Utrecht	21.4	17.3	13.3	10.0	6.4	8.4	7.6	1.8	3.7	2.0	2.4	1.2	1.6	0.8	2.2
Zeeland	25.0	13.4	9.9	11.3	4.3	11.5	3.2	0.8	9.3	2.9	2.3	2.7	0.5	1.3	1.5
