= Evangelical People's Party (Netherlands) =

Evangelical People's Party Evangelische Volkspartij
- Leader: Cathy Ubels (1982–1989)
- Founded: 7 March 1981
- Dissolved: 9 March 1991
- Split from: Christian Democratic Appeal
- Merged into: GroenLinks
- Ideology: Christian left
- Political position: Centre-left
- Colours: Purple

The Evangelical People's Party (Dutch: Evangelische Volkspartij, EVP) was a minor progressive Protestant political party in the Netherlands. It is one of the predecessor parties of the modern-day GroenLinks.

== History ==
The EVP was founded in March 1981 by members of the Christian Democratic Appeal (CDA), which were united in the group "Not by Bread Alone" (Dutch: Niet bij Brood Alleen) and members of the Evangelical Progressive Party, which had previously left the Protestant Anti-Revolutionary Party. Both groups were opposed to the formation of the CDA and its conservative course.

After winning one seat in the 1982 general election (it was unable to do so in 1981), the party joined the opposition. The party became divided between a left wing and a centrist wing. The left wing wanted to co-operate with the Political Party of Radicals (which had split from the Catholic People's Party in 1968) and its left-wing allies, the Pacifist Socialist Party and the destalinised Communist Party of the Netherlands. The EVP was more reserved towards the CPN. The centrist wing wanted to co-operate with the Labour Party and the CDA. Although some members were willing to co-operate, the party congress rejected the co-operation with the CPN, the PSP and the PPR in the 1984 European Parliament elections.

After the party lost its sole seat in the 1986 elections, co-operation with other parties become more important. For the 1989 elections the Political Party of Radicals (PPR), Pacifist Socialist Party (PSP) and the Communist Party of the Netherlands initiated a common list GreenLeft. The EVP hesitated to join, and only after the talks were concluded did it opt to enter. It got one candidate on an ineligible eleventh place. In 1991, the party officially dissolved itself into GreenLeft in the Moses and Aaron Church in Amsterdam. Prominent EVP-members became involved in the Left (wing) Cheek, a platform for the New Testament and Politics. This platform still exists, but it is only of limited importance within the party.

== Ideology and issues ==
The party combined left-wing ideas with a green program, inspired by the New Testament. The Sermon on the Mount was an important inspiration for the party. The Sermon was seen as an evangelical imperative to create a society where justice, peace and solidarity would rule. Important issues for the party were:

- A pacifist foreign policy, especially opposition to the placement of nuclear weapons.
- It sought to formulate an alternative to both capitalism and communism. It proposed the economy of enough, in which incomes would be redistributed, people would get more rest (for instance by a government-financed sabbatical for all) and damage to the environment would be limited.
- The party was progressive on social and ethical issues, such as gay rights and abortion.

== Election results ==
=== House of Representatives ===
Election	Lead candidate	List	Votes		Seats	Ref.
Election	Lead candidate	List	No.	%	Seats	Ref.
1981	Rien Weststrate	List	45,189	0.52	1 / 150	
1982	Cathy Ubels	List	56,466	0.69	1 / 150	
1986	Cathy Ubels	List	21,998	0.24	0 / 150	

== Electorate ==
The EVP's small electorate consisted out of left-wing Protestants, mostly former adherents of the Anti-Revolutionary Party, for whom opposition to the placement of nuclear weapons was an important issue. The party was open to non-religious persons.

== Organisation ==
=== Linked organisations ===
The EVP published a periodical called "EVP info", which was continued after 1990 as "The Leftwing Cheek" within GreenLeft. Its scientific institute was Foundation for Formation and Education, which published "Schering en Inslag"

=== Relationships to other parties ===
The party had good relations with the Political Party of Radicals (PPR), which also had its roots in Christian democracy and emphasised green ideals. It also had good relations with the social-democratic Labour Party and the Pacifist Socialist Party (PSP). In 1989 it chose for the PPR and the PSP and merged into the GreenLeft, together with the Communist Party of the Netherlands, a party towards which the EVP was more reserved, because of its atheism, alignment with communist dictatorships and centralised organisation.
