= 1972 Dutch general election =

Election of the members of the House of Representatives

- 29 November 1972
- All 150 seats in the House of Representatives; 76 seats needed for a majority
- Turnout: 83.5% (▲4.4 pp)
Party	Leader	Vote %	Seats	+/–
PvdA	Joop den Uyl	27.3%	43	+4
KVP	Frans Andriessen	17.7%	27	−8
VVD	Hans Wiegel	14.4%	22	+6
ARP	Barend Biesheuvel	8.8%	14	+1
PPR	Bas de Gaay Fortman	4.8%	7	+5
CHU	Arnold Tilanus	4.4%	7	−3
CPN	Marcus Bakker	4.4%	7	+1
D'66	Hans van Mierlo	4.1%	6	−5
DS'70	Willem Drees Jr.	4.1%	6	−2
SGP	Hette Abma	2.2%	3	0
BP	Hendrik Koekoek	1.9%	3	+2
GPV	Piet Jongeling	1.8%	2	0
PSP	Bram van der Lek	1.5%	2	0
RKPN	Klaas Beuker	0.9%	1	New
This lists parties that won seats. See the complete results below.
Most voted-for party by municipality
Cabinet before	Cabinet after
Second Biesheuvel cabinet KVP–VVD–ARP–CHU	Den Uyl cabinet PvdA–KVP–ARP–D'66–PPR

Early general elections were held in the Netherlands on 29 November 1972. The Labour Party (PvdA) remained the largest party, winning 43 of the 150 seats in the House of Representatives.

The elections led to a five-party coalition government consisting of the PvdA, the Catholic People's Party, the Anti-Revolutionary Party, the Political Party of Radicals and Democrats 1966 with the PvdA's Joop den Uyl as Prime Minister.

== Results ==
Party	Votes	%	Seats	+/–
Labour Party	2,021,454	27.34	43	+4
Catholic People's Party	1,305,401	17.65	27	–8
People's Party for Freedom and Democracy	1,068,375	14.45	22	+6
Anti-Revolutionary Party	653,609	8.84	14	–1
Political Party of Radicals	354,829	4.80	7	+5
Christian Historical Union	354,463	4.79	7	–3
Communist Party of the Netherlands	330,398	4.47	7	+1
Democrats 1966	307,048	4.15	6	–5
Democratic Socialists '70	304,714	4.12	6	–2
Reformed Political Party	163,114	2.21	3	0
Farmers' Party	143,239	1.94	3	+2
Reformed Political League	131,236	1.77	2	0
Pacifist Socialist Party	111,262	1.50	2	0
Roman Catholic Party of the Netherlands	67,658	0.92	1	New
Democratic Centre Party	41,262	0.56	0	New
Dutch Middle Class Party	32,970	0.45	0	–2
Stam List	1,547	0.02	0	New
Party of the Right	656	0.01	0	0
Anti Woningnood Actie Centrum	574	0.01	0	New
New Roman Party	236	0.00	0	0
Total	7,394,045	100.00	150	0
Valid votes	7,394,045	99.31		
Invalid/blank votes	51,242	0.69		
Total votes	7,445,287	100.00		
Registered voters/turnout	8,915,179	83.51		
Source: Kiesraad

=== By province ===
Results by province
Province	PvdA	KVP	VVD	ARP	PPR	CHU	CPN	D'66	DS'70	SGP	BP	GPV	PSP	RKPN	Others
Drenthe	37.2	5.3	15.2	14.5	2.9	7.1	3.2	3.0	3.4	0.3	2.5	2.8	1.0	0.2	1.3
Friesland	31.9	4.7	10.0	21.0	3.2	10.9	3.7	2.8	3.4	1.1	1.5	3.1	1.3	0.3	1.0
Gelderland	26.1	18.2	14.1	9.2	4.9	7.4	1.7	3.3	3.7	3.9	2.7	1.7	1.3	0.8	1.2
Groningen	34.9	3.5	11.9	15.1	3.5	5.4	8.6	3.1	3.7	0.3	1.5	5.2	1.6	0.4	1.4
Limburg	20.2	43.9	12.3	2.2	4.7	0.4	2.8	4.0	2.2	0.1	2.4	0.2	1.2	2.1	1.2
North Brabant	20.3	37.7	13.5	4.4	5.2	1.3	2.3	4.0	2.7	0.5	3.7	0.5	1.4	1.5	1.1
North Holland	27.7	12.7	16.6	6.5	5.9	2.5	9.9	5.3	5.6	0.5	1.2	1.1	2.5	1.0	1.0
Overijssel	25.1	19.9	10.8	10.0	4.0	8.8	3.3	3.0	3.2	3.1	2.7	3.4	0.9	0.8	1.0
South Holland	32.2	9.8	15.6	9.7	4.5	5.0	4.2	4.9	4.8	3.7	1.0	1.7	1.3	0.6	0.9
Southern IJsselmeer Polders	22.7	10.6	16.2	17.5	6.4	7.7	2.5	4.6	4.2	1.7	1.0	3.4	0.9	0.2	0.3
Utrecht	23.1	13.8	17.6	10.4	5.9	5.7	2.6	4.2	6.0	3.4	1.3	2.8	1.7	0.8	0.8
Zeeland	27.2	11.1	14.2	11.4	4.2	9.3	1.1	2.8	2.8	9.2	1.9	2.6	0.7	0.6	1.1
