= Bauke Roolvink =

Dutch politician (1912–1979)

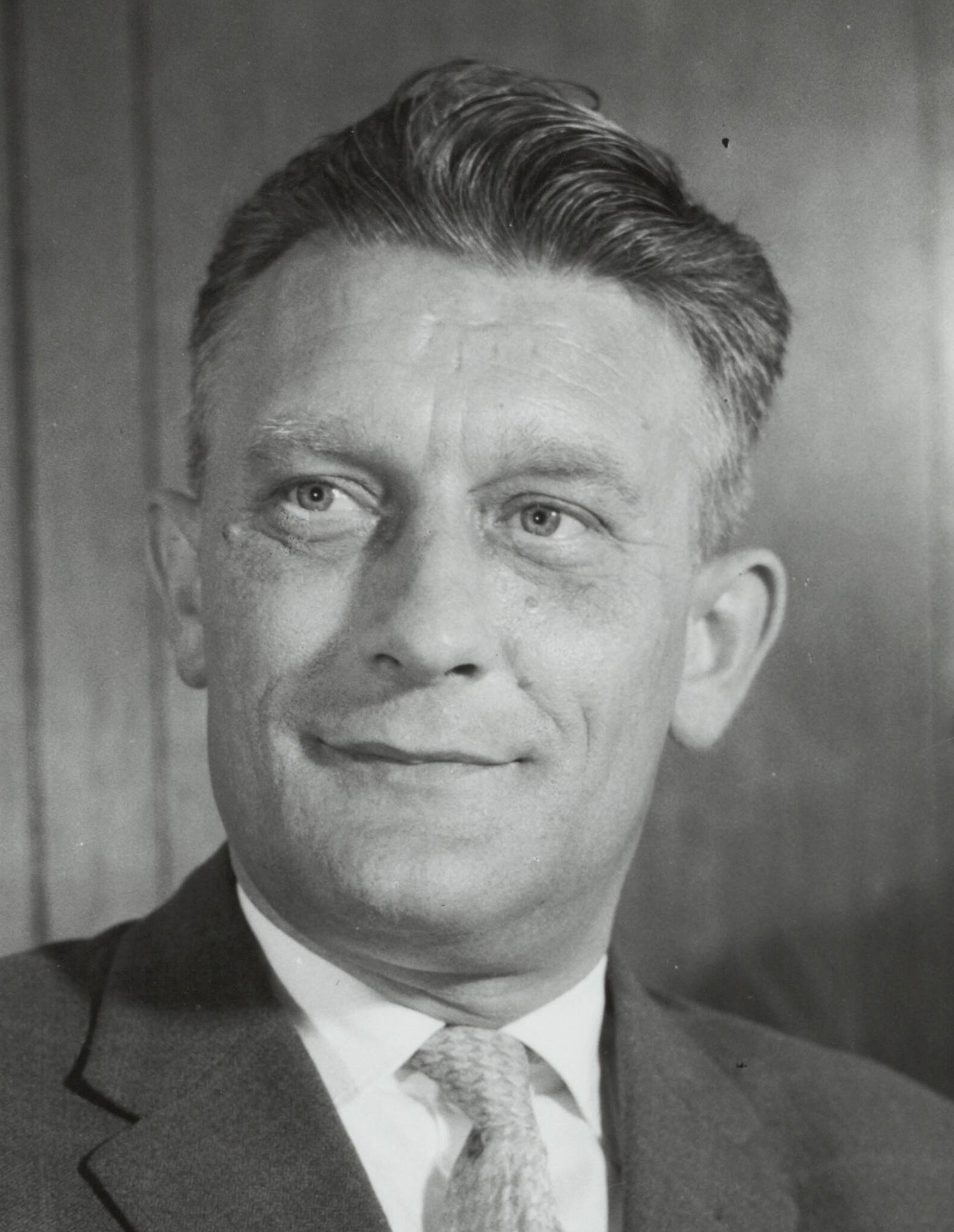
- Roolvink in 1959

Minister of Social Affairs and Health
- In office 5 April 1967 – 6 July 1971
- Prime Minister: Piet de Jong
- Preceded by: Gerard Veldkamp
- Succeeded by: Louis Stuyt as Minister of Health and Environment; Jaap Boersma as Minister of Social Affairs

Parliamentary leader in the House of Representatives
- In office 14 April 1965 – 23 February 1967
- Preceded by: Jan Smallenbroek
- Succeeded by: Barend Biesheuvel
- Parliamentary group: Anti-Revolutionary Party

Member of the House of Representatives
- In office 11 May 1971 – 8 June 1977
- In office 2 July 1963 – 5 April 1967
- Parliamentary group: Anti-Revolutionary Party

State Secretary for Social Affairs and Health
- In office 15 June 1959 – 24 July 1963
- Prime Minister: Jan de Quay
- Preceded by: Aat van Rhijn
- Succeeded by: José de Meijer; Louis Bartels

Member of the Social and Economic Council
- In office 1 December 1952 – 15 June 1959
- Chairman: Frans de Vries (1952–1958); Gerard Verrijn Stuart (1958–1959)

Personal details
- Born: Bauke Roolvink; 31 January 1912 Wijtgaard, Netherlands
- Died: 25 November 1979 (aged 67) Baarn, Netherlands
- Party: Anti-Revolutionary Party (from 1935)
- Spouse: Gijsberta Schouten (m. 1935)
- Children: 3 sons and 3 daughters
- Occupation: Politician · Trade Union leader · Corporate director · Nonprofit director · Foundryman · Teacher

Bauke Roolvink (31 January 1912 – 25 November 1979) was a Dutch politician of the defunct Anti-Revolutionary Party (ARP) now merged into the Christian Democratic Appeal (CDA) party and trade union leader

== Biography ==
Roolvink worked as a foundry-man at a shipyard in Leeuwarden from May 1928 until July 1929, and as a machine operator at a factory in Hilversum from July 1929 until April 1946. He was the leader of the National Federation of Christian Trade Unions (CNV) from April 1946 until June 1959 and served as general-secretary of its executive board from December 1952 until June 1959. He served on the Municipal Council of Hilversum from September 1949 until 15 June 1959.

After the election of 1959, Roolvink was appointed as state secretary for social affairs and health in the Cabinet De Quay, taking office on 15 June 1959. Roolvink was elected as a Member of the House of Representatives after the election of 1963, taking office on 2 July 1963. Following the cabinet formation of 1963 Roolvink was not giving a cabinet post in the new cabinet, the Cabinet De Quay was replaced by the Cabinet Marijnen on 24 July 1963 and he continued to serve in the House of Representatives as a frontbencher and the de facto Whip. On 27 February 1965 the Cabinet Marijnen fell and continued to serve in a demissionary capacity until the cabinet formation of 1965 with the Parliamentary leader of the Anti-Revolutionary Party in the House of Representatives Jan Smallenbroek appointed as Minister of the Interior in the Cabinet Cals, the Anti-Revolutionary Party leadership approached Roolvink as his successor as Parliamentary leader, Roolvink accepted and became the Parliamentary leader, taking office on 14 April 1965. After the election of 1967 the Leader of the Anti-Revolutionary Party Barend Biesheuvel returned to the House of Representatives and took over as Parliamentary leader on 23 February 1967. Following the cabinet formation of 1967 Roolvink was appointed as Minister of Social Affairs and Health in the Cabinet De Jong, taking office on 5 April 1967. After the election of 1971 Roolvink returned as member of the House of Representatives, taking office on 11 May 1971. Following the cabinet formation of 1971 Roolvink was not giving a cabinet post in the new cabinet, the Cabinet De Jong was replaced by the Cabinet Biesheuvel I on 6 July 1971 and he continued to serve in the House of Representatives as a frontbencher chairing the special parliamentary committee for Protection of Employment and the special parliamentary committee for Income Policies and spokesperson for Social Affairs, Economic Affairs and Employment. Roolvink also became active in the private sector and public sector and occupied numerous seats as a corporate director and nonprofit director on several boards of directors and supervisory boards (DSM Company, Gulf Oil, AVEBE, RDM Company and the International Institute of Social History). In February 1977 Roolvink announced his retirement from national politics and that he would not stand for the election of 1977 and continued to serve until the end of the parliamentary term on 8 June 1977.

Roolvink was known for his abilities as a debater and manager. Roolvink continued to comment on political affairs until his is death at the age of 67 and holds the distinction as the last serving minister of social affairs and health.

== Decorations ==
Honours
Ribbon bar	Honour	Country	Date
	Knight of the Order of the Netherlands Lion	Netherlands	27 July 1963
	Grand Officer of the Order of Leopold II	Belgium	12 August 1968
	Commander of the Order of Orange-Nassau	Netherlands	17 July 1971

Party political offices
Preceded by Jan Smallenbroek	Parliamentary leader of the Anti-Revolutionary Party in the House of Representatives; 1965–1967	Succeeded by Barend Biesheuvel
Political offices
Preceded by Aat van Rhijn	State Secretary for Social; Affairs and Health; 1959–1963	Succeeded by José de Meijer
Preceded by Aat van Rhijn	State Secretary for Social; Affairs and Health; 1959–1963	Succeeded by Louis Bartels
Preceded by Gerard Veldkamp	Minister of Social; Affairs and Health; 1967–1971	Succeeded by Louis Stuyt as Minister of Health and Environment
Preceded by Gerard Veldkamp	Minister of Social; Affairs and Health; 1967–1971	Succeeded by Jaap Boersma as Minister of Social Affairs
