= Gerard Veldkamp =

Dutch politician

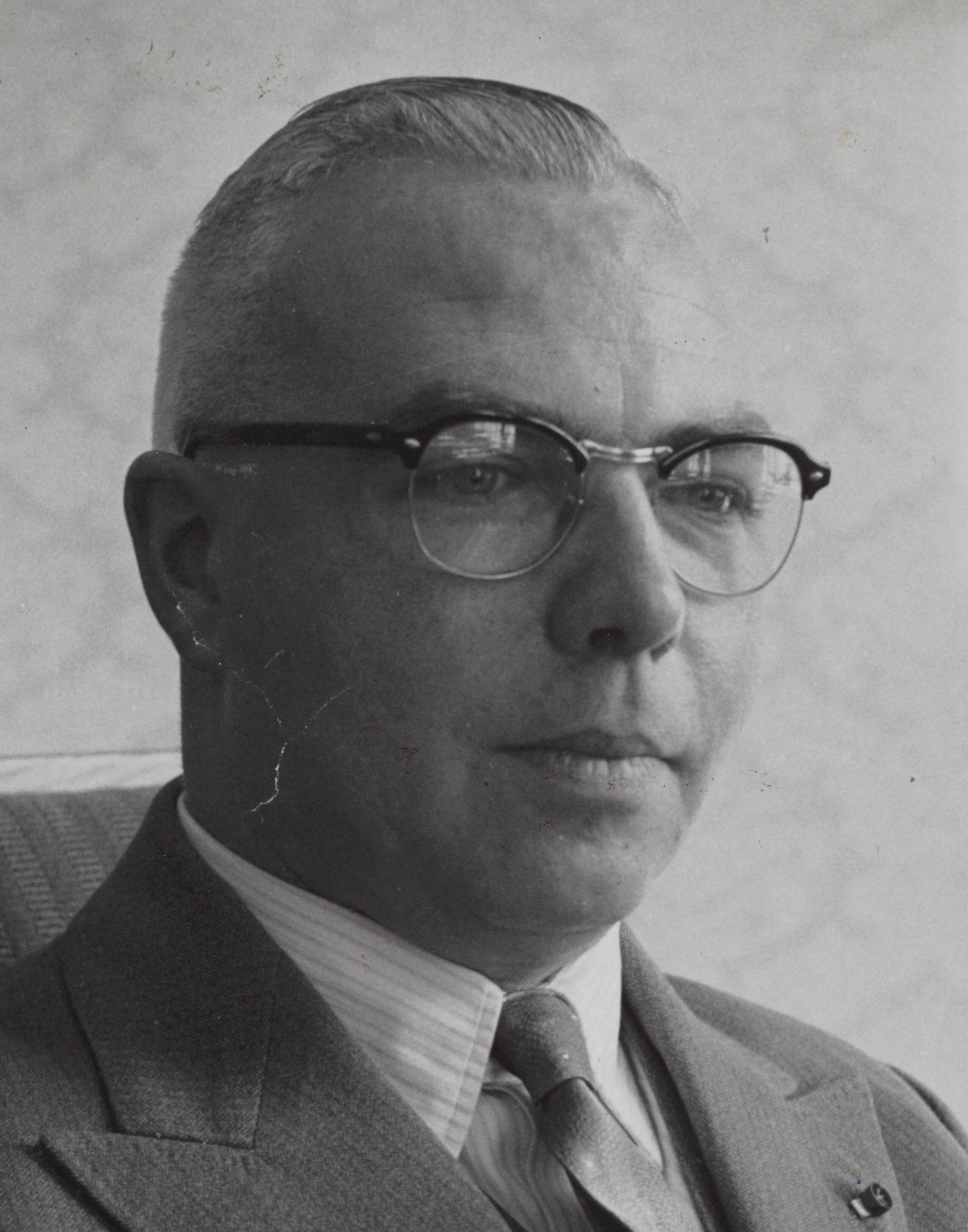
- Gerard Veldkamp in 1961

Member of the Scientific Council for Government Policy
- In office 20 November 1972 – 1 December 1982
- Director: See list: Sjeng Kremers (1972–1977) Wim Schut (1977–1978) Theo Quené (1978–1985)

Minister of Social Affairs and Health
- In office 17 July 1961 – 5 April 1967
- Prime Minister: See list: Jan de Quay (1961–1963) Victor Marijnen (1963–1965) Jo Cals (1965–1966) Jelle Zijlstra (1967–1967)
- Preceded by: Victor Marijnen (Ad interim)
- Succeeded by: Bauke Roolvink

Member of the House of Representatives
- In office 2 July 1963 – 24 July 1963
- In office 24 March 1959 – 19 May 1959
- Parliamentary group: Catholic People's Party

State Secretary for Economic Affairs
- In office 10 October 1952 – 17 July 1961
- Prime Minister: See list: Willem Drees (1952–1958) Louis Beel (1958–1959) Jan de Quay (1959–1961)
- Preceded by: Wim van der Grinten
- Succeeded by: Frans Gijzels

Personal details
- Born: Gerardus Mattheus Johannes Veldkamp; 27 June 1921 Breda, Netherlands
- Died: 15 October 1990 (aged 69) Paris, France
- Party: Christian Democratic Appeal (from 1980)
- Other political affiliations: Catholic People's Party (until 1980)
- Spouse: Maria Clarijs (m. 1948)
- Children: 4 daughters and 1 son
- Education: Tilburg University (Bachelor of Economics, Master of Economics, Doctor of Philosophy)
- Occupation: Politician · Civil servant · Economist · Financial analyst · Sociologist · Academic administrator · Researcher · Columnist · Editor · Author · Professor

Gerardus Mattheus Johannes "Gerard" Veldkamp (27 June 1921 – 15 September 1990) was a Dutch politician of the Catholic People's Party (KVP) and economist.

== Biography ==
Veldkamp applied at the Tilburg Catholic Economic University in September 1945 majoring in Economics and obtaining a Bachelor of Economics degree in August 1946 and worked as a student researcher before graduating with a Master of Economics degree in May 1948 and continued his study at the Tilburg Catholic Economic University where worked as a researcher until he got a doctorate as a Doctor of Philosophy in Microeconomics on 10 November 1949. Veldkamp worked as a civics teacher in Breda September 1947 until October 1952 and for the Labour Council in Breda from June 1948 until April 1950. Veldkamp worked as a civil servant for the Social Affairs and Health from April 1950 until October 1952. Veldkamp also worked a writer and columnist for several scientific magazines from February 1947 until October 1952. Veldkamp served on the Municipal Council of Breda from April 1948 until October 1952.

After the election of 1952 Veldkamp was appointed as State Secretary for Economic Affairs in the Cabinet Drees II, taking office on 10 October 1952. After the election of 1956 Veldkamp continued as State Secretary for Economic Affairs in the Cabinet Drees III, taking office on 13 October 1956. The Cabinet Drees III fell on 11 December 1958 continued to serve in a demissionary capacity until the cabinet formation of 1958 when it was replaced by the caretaker Cabinet Beel II with Veldkamp remaining as State Secretary for Economic Affairs, taking office on 22 December 1958. Veldkamp was elected as a Member of the House of Representatives after the election of 1959, taking office on 24 March 1959. Following the cabinet formation of 1959 Veldkamp continued as State Secretary for Economic Affairs in the Cabinet De Quay, taking office on 19 May 1959. Veldkamp was appointed as Minister of Social Affairs and Health following the resignation of Charles van Rooy, taking office on 17 July 1961. After the election of 1963 Veldkamp returned as a Member of the House of Representatives, taking office on 2 July 1963. Following the cabinet formation of 1963 Veldkamp remained as Minister of Social Affairs and Health in the Cabinet Marijnen, taking office on 24 July 1963. The Cabinet Marijnen fell on 27 February 1965 and continued to serve in a demissionary capacity until the cabinet formation of 1965 when it was replaced by the Cabinet Cals with Veldkamp continuing as Minister of Social Affairs and Health, taking office on 14 April 1965. The Cabinet Cals fell just one year later on 14 October 1966 and continued to serve in a demissionary capacity until the cabinet formation of 1966 when it was replaced by the caretaker Cabinet Zijlstra with Veldkamp remaining as Minister of Social Affairs and Health, taking office on 22 November 1966. In December 1966 Veldkamp announced that he wouldn't stand for the election of 1967. Following the cabinet formation of 1967 Veldkamp per his own request asked not to be considered for a cabinet post in the new cabinet, the Cabinet Zijlstra was replaced by the Cabinet De Jong on 5 April 1967.

Veldkamp semi-retired from active politics and became active in the private sector and public sector and occupied numerous seats as a corporate director and nonprofit director on several boards of directors and supervisory boards (Society for Statistics and Operations Research, World Press Photo, Leiden University Medical Center and the Society for the Advancement of Science, Medicine and Surgery) and served on several state commissions and councils on behalf of the government (Biesheuvel Commission, Netherlands Cadastre Agency, Public Pension Funds APB, Toxopeus Commission, Statistics Netherlands and the Scientific Council for Government Policy). Veldkamp also served as a distinguished professor of Social security at the Leiden University from 1 September 1978 until 1 January 1987 and as distinguished professor of Welfare economics at the Tilburg University from 1 January 1984 until 1 November 1986

Veldkamp was known for his abilities as a debater and policy wonk. Veldkamp continued to comment on political affairs as a statesman until his death. He holds the distinction as the longest-serving State Secretary for Economic Affairs with 8 years.

=== Early life ===
Gerardus Mattheus Johannes Veldkamp was born on 27 June 1921 in Breda in the Province of North Brabant in a Roman Catholic family.

=== Politics ===
Veldkamp was a KVP Minister of Social Affairs and Health, who brought important legislation about social matters, such as the General Child, the Health Insurance Act, the Act on social minimum, and the Law on Disability and Unemployment Provision Act. He brought in this function the first Middle Class Notes.

In 1961 after an intervention of Prime-minister Marijnen, he succeeded the weak Van Rooy as minister, and directly guided the Law on Child support through the parliament. Veldkamp had good relations with the unions, but few friends in the cabinets to which he belonged. He was in favor of cooperation with the Labour Party. He was a very skilled legislator, but also a crass hustler in discussions and regularly the focus of government hassles.

After his ministry he was a Professor of Study of Social Security at the Leiden University.

== Publications ==
Veldkamp has authored and co-authored several publications. Books, a selection:

- 1952. De sociale verzekering in de volkshuishouding. With D.B.J. Schouten. Amsterdam : Veen.

== Decorations ==
Jonours
Ribbon bar	Honour	Country	Date
	Knight Grand Cross of the Order of Orange-Nassau	Netherlands	27 April 1967

Political offices
Preceded by Wim van der Grinten	State Secretary for Economic Affairs; 1952–1961	Succeeded by Frans Gijzels
Preceded by Victor Marijnen; Ad interim	Minister of Social; Affairs and Health; 1961–1967	Succeeded by Bauke Roolvink
