= Jan Smallenbroek =

Dutch politician (1909–1974)

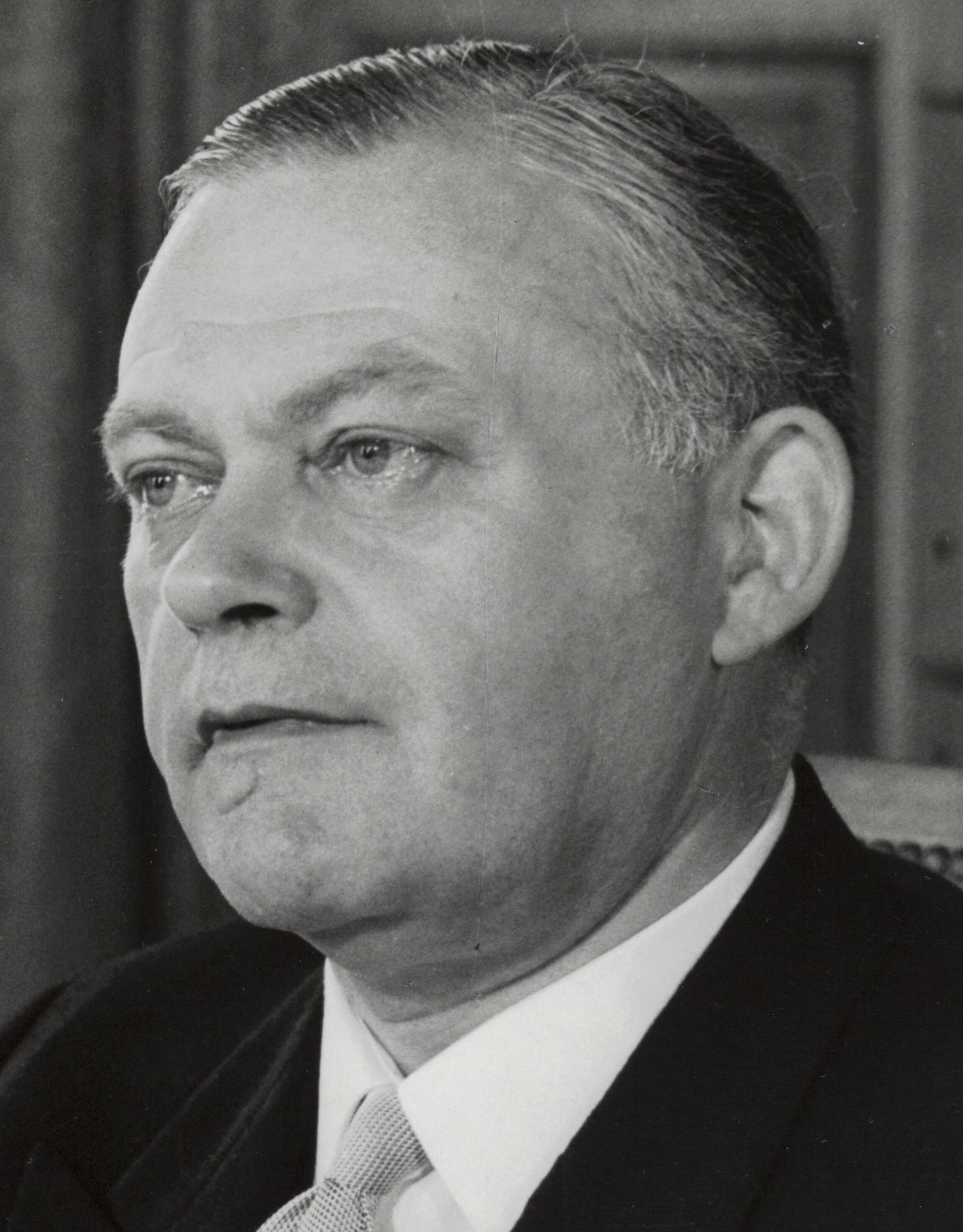
- Smallenbroek in 1965

Member of the Council of State
- In office 1 September 1967 – 29 September 1974
- Vice President: Louis Beel (1967–1972); Marinus Ruppert (1973–1974)

Minister of the Interior
- In office 14 April 1965 – 31 August 1966
- Prime Minister: Jo Cals
- Preceded by: Edzo Toxopeus
- Succeeded by: Ivo Samkalden (Ad interim)

Parliamentary leader in the House of Representatives
- In office 24 July 1963 – 14 April 1965
- Preceded by: Barend Biesheuvel
- Succeeded by: Bauke Roolvink
- Parliamentary group: Anti-Revolutionary Party

Member of the House of Representatives
- In office 6 November 1956 – 14 April 1965
- In office 20 November 1945 – 4 June 1946
- Parliamentary group: Anti-Revolutionary Party

Mayor of Elburg
- In office 1 April 1940 – 15 May 1940; Ad interim
- Preceded by: Rhijnvis Feith
- Succeeded by: Godert van Lynden

Personal details
- Born: Jan Smallenbroek; 21 February 1909 Assen, Netherlands
- Died: 29 September 1974 (aged 65) Wassenaar, Netherlands
- Cause of death: Cancer
- Party: Anti-Revolutionary Party (from 1927)
- Spouses: Janna Buning (m. 1935; died 1940) Anje Stoker (m. 1945)
- Children: 2 daughters and 1 son (first marriage); 2 sons and 1 daughter (second marriage)
- Education: Rijks Hogere Burgerschool (Assen)
- Occupation: Politician · Civil servant · Tax collector · Nonprofit director

Jan Smallenbroek (21 February 1909 – 29 September 1974) was a Dutch politician of the defunct Anti-Revolutionary Party (ARP) now merged into the Christian Democratic Appeal (CDA) party and nonprofit director.

== Biography ==
Smallenbroek attended the Rijks Hogere Burgerschool (Assen) in Assen from April 1926 until May 1931. Smallenbroek worked as a civil servant for the municipality of Ooststellingwerf from May 1931 until July 1936 and for the municipality of Elburg from July 1936 until April 1941. Smallenbroek served on the Municipal Council of Elburg from September 1939 until September 1941 and served as an Alderman in Elburg at the same time. On 10 May 1940 Nazi Germany invaded the Netherlands and the government fled to London to escape the German occupation. Smallenbroek served as acting Mayor of Elburg from 1 April 1940 until 15 May 1940. Smallenbroek joined the Dutch resistance against the German occupiers in May 1940. Smallenbroek worked as a civil servant for the municipality of Assen from September 1941 until April 1942 and as a tax collector for the Tax and Customs Administration of the Ministry of Finance from April 1942 until January 1944. On 12 January 1944 Smallenbroek was arrested by the Gestapo and detained in a Oranjehotel in Scheveningen and was released on 5 May 1945.

Following the end of World War II Queen Wilhelmina ordered a Recall of Parliament and Smallenbroek was appointment as a Member of the House of Representatives taking the place of Willem Wagenaar, taking office on 20 November 1945 serving as a frontbencher and the de facto Whip. After the election of 1946 Smallenbroek wasn't reelected and he continued to serve until the end of the parliamentary term on 4 June 1946. Smallenbroek served on the Provincial-Council of Drenthe from 19 June 1946 until 14 April 1965 and as a member of the Provincial-executive of Drenthe at the same time. After the election of 1956 Smallenbroek returned as Member of the House of Representatives, taking office on 6 November 1956 serving as a frontbencher and spokesperson for the Interior, Social Affairs, Social Work and Civil Service. After the election of 1963 the Leader of the Anti-Revolutionary Party and Parliamentary leader of the Anti-Revolutionary Party in the House of Representatives Barend Biesheuvel was appointed as Deputy Prime Minister, Minister of Agriculture and Fisheries and Minister for Suriname and Netherlands Antilles Affairs in the Cabinet Marijnen, the Anti-Revolutionary Party leadership approached Smallenbroek as his successor as Parliamentary leader, Smallenbroek accepted and became the Parliamentary leader, taking office on 24 July 1963. On 27 February 1965 the Cabinet Marijnen fell and continued to serve in a demissionary capacity until the cabinet formation of 1965 when it was replaced with the Cabinet Cals with Smallenbroek appointed as Minister of the Interior, taking office on 14 April 1965. On 31 August 1966 Smallenbroek resigned following a Hit and run accident due to driving under the influence. Smallenbroek remained in active in national politics, in August 1967 he was nominated as a Member of the Council of State, taking office on 1 September 1967. In June 1967 Smallenbroek was diagnosed with terminal cancer, he died four months later at the age of 65.

Smallenbroek was known for his abilities as a manager and policy wonk.

== Decorations ==
Honours
Ribbon bar	Honour	Country	Date	Comment
	Knight of the Order of the Netherlands Lion	Netherlands	30 April 1953	

Party political offices
Preceded by Barend Biesheuvel	Parliamentary leader of the Anti-Revolutionary Party in the House of Representatives; 1963–1965	Succeeded by Bauke Roolvink
Political offices
Preceded by Rhijnvis Feith	Mayor of Elburg; Ad interim 1940	Succeeded by Godert van Lynden
Preceded by Edzo Toxopeus	Minister of the Interior; 1965–1966	Succeeded by Ivo Samkalden; Ad interim
