= 1965 Dutch cabinet formation =

Formation of the Cals cabinet

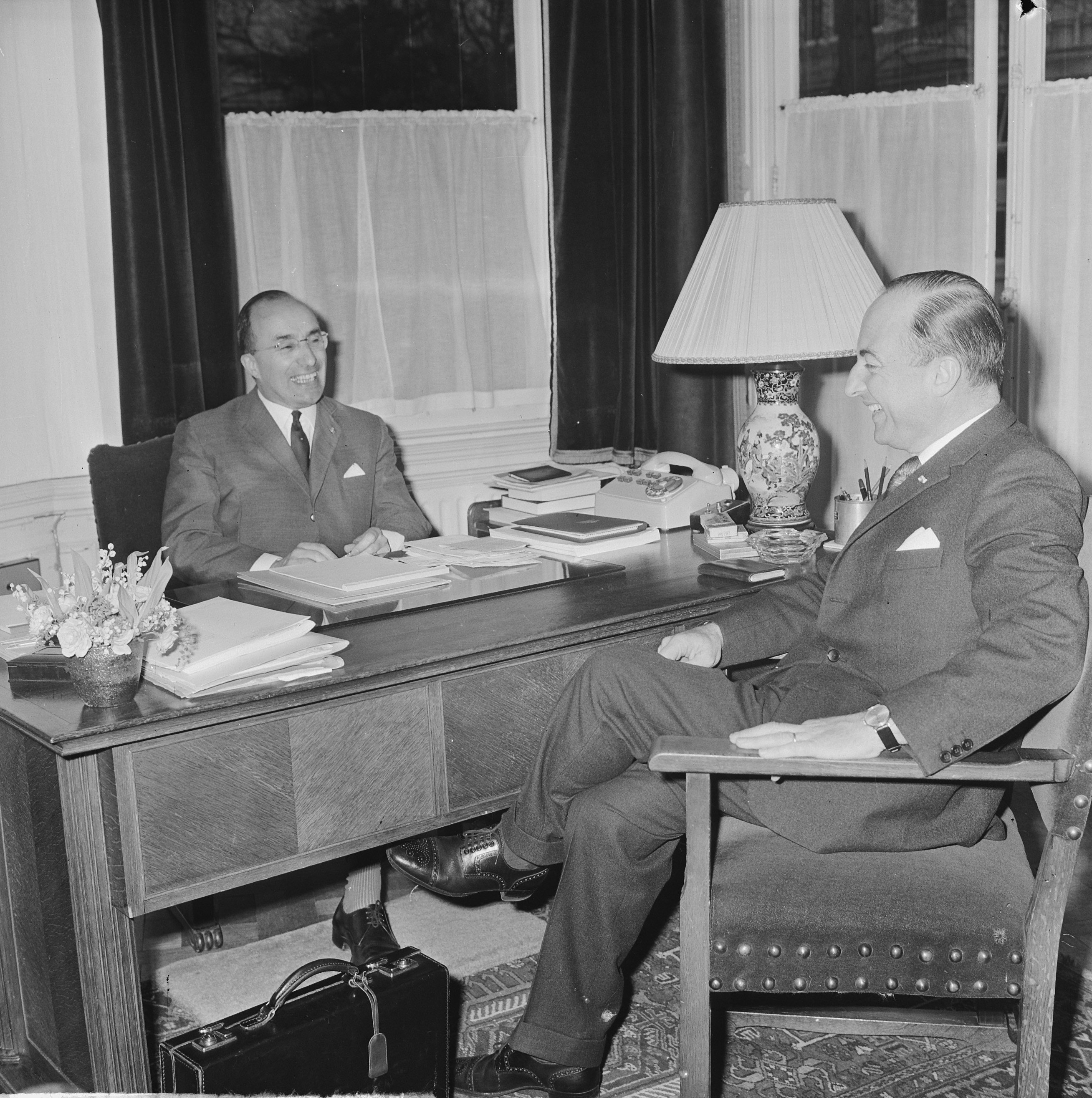
Formateur Jo Cals together with KVP parliamentary leader Norbert Schmelzer, who had acted as informateur before Cals

A process of cabinet formation took place in the Netherlands after the cabinet crisis over the public broadcasting system led to the resignation of the Marijnen cabinet on 27 February 1965. The formation resulted in the Cals cabinet on 14 April 1965. The coalition was formed by the Catholic People's Party (KVP), the Labour Party (PvdA) and the Anti-Revolutionary Party (ARP).

== Background ==
After the 1963 general election, a cabinet formation led to the Marijnen cabinet, comprising Catholic People's Party (KVP), People's Party for Freedom and Democracy (VVD), Anti Revolutionary Party (ARP) and Christian Historical Union (CHU). Prime minister was Victor Marijnen (KVP). The parties could not agree on the introduction of commercial television, advertising on television and the introduction of new broadcasters, which became more urgent with raid of REM Island in 1964. Minister of Education, Arts and Sciences Theo Bot had promised to send a proposal to the House of Representatives before 1 March 1965. Because of Marijnen's absence, the discussion started relatively close to the deadline. When presented in the cabinet, the VVD ministers in particular disliked Bot's proposal. On 27 February 1965, Marijnen concluded that the differences could not be bridged and offered the resignation of the cabinet.

== Debate and consultations ==
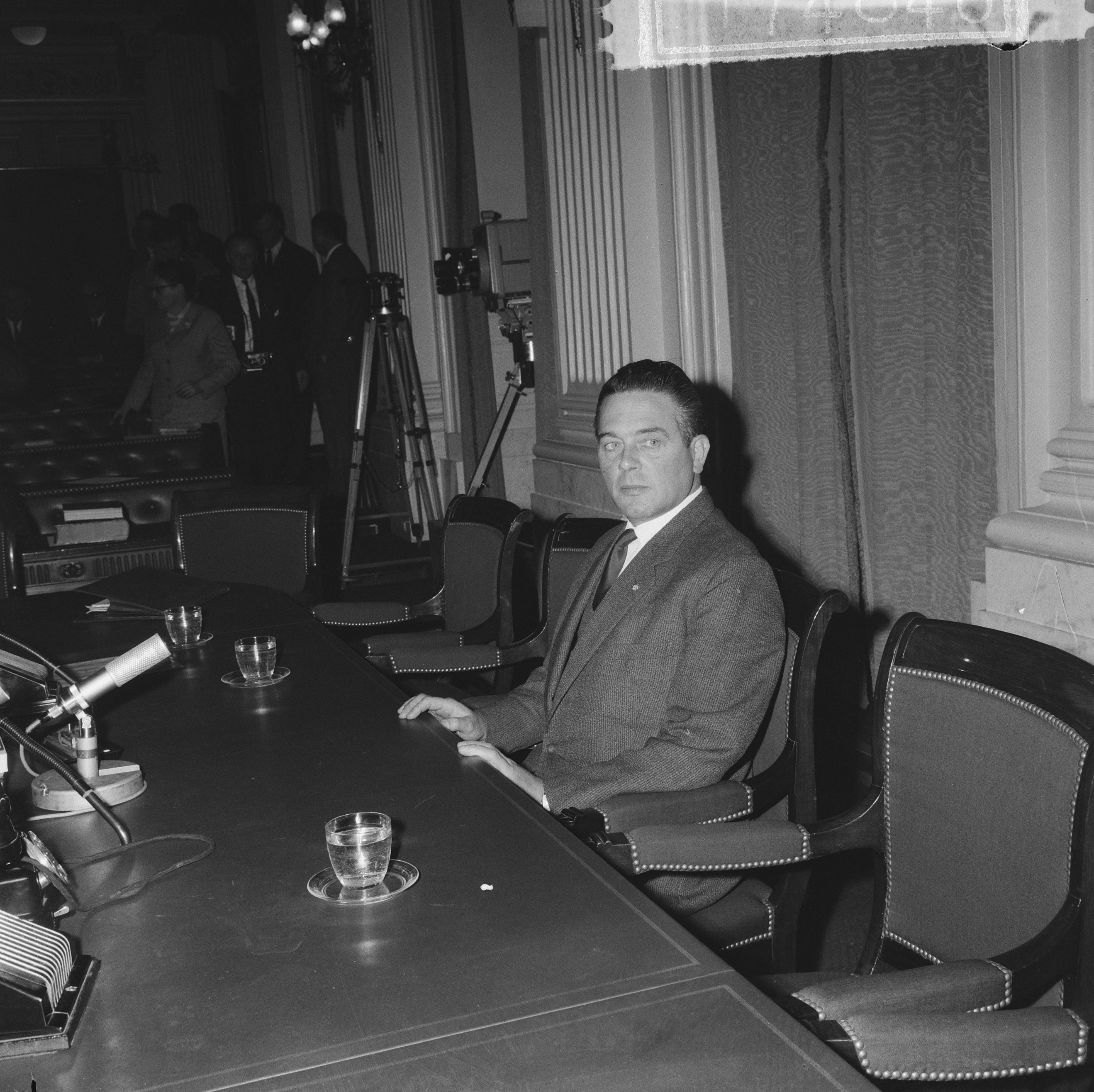
Prime minister Victor Marijnen sitting in silence during the debate about the cabinet crisis on 1 March 1965

The House of Representatives received a brief letter about the resignation, but the opposition had little knowledge of what happened. Therefore, PvdA leader Anne Vondeling requested a debate on 1 March. When no ministers showed up to the debate, Vondeling requested the presence of the prime minister. This request was support by all parliamentary leaders except for Molly Geertsema (VVD). Marijnen attended the debate, but spoke no word. Even the statement that he would remain silent was read aloud by the speaker of the House. The opposition asked for the information, but the coalition parties opposed this.

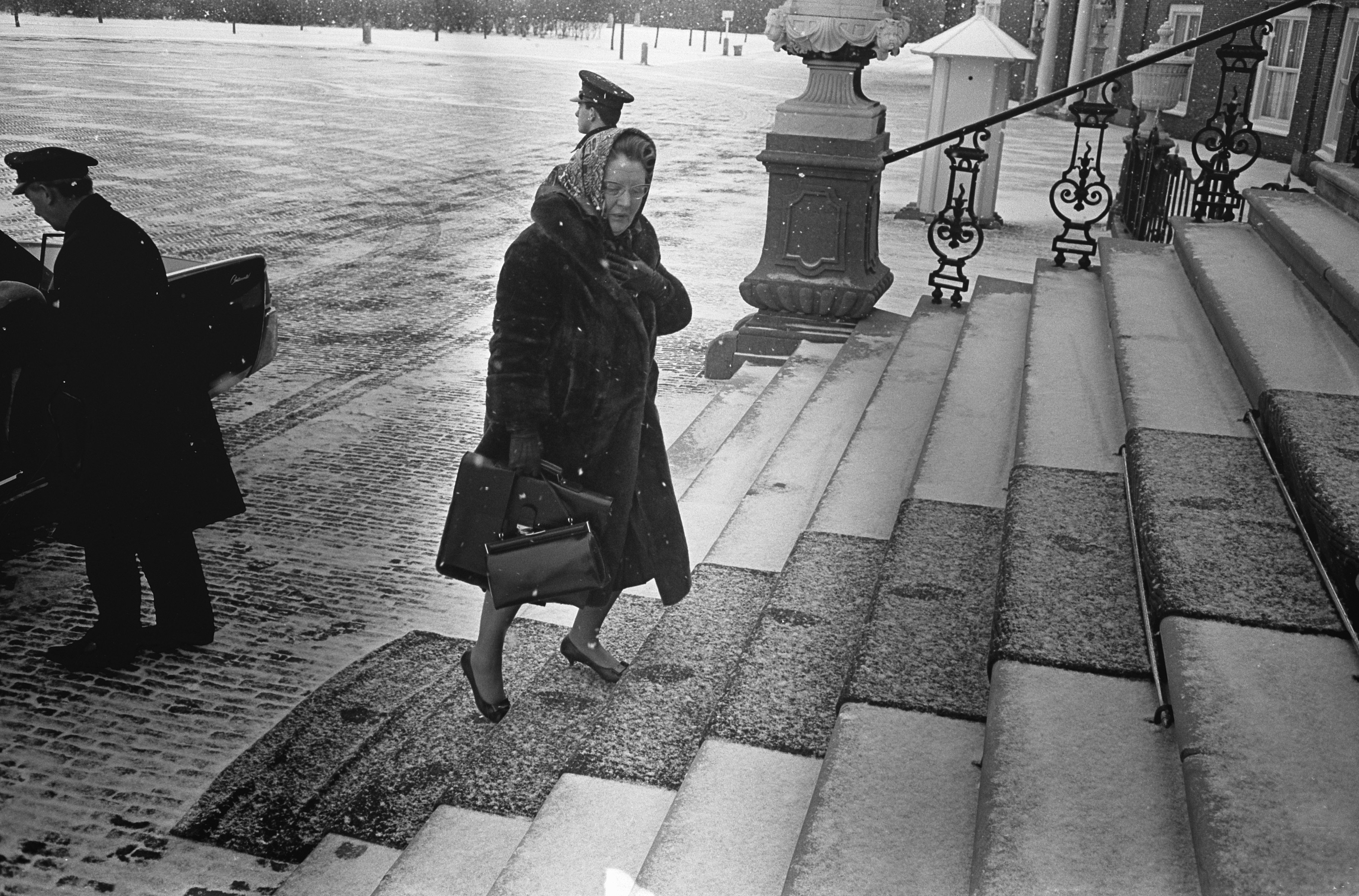
Queen Juliana arriving at Huis ten Bosch on 2 March, where she receives her advisers

Queen Juliana had waited with consultations until after the debate. Almost all advisers and parliamentary leaders advised the queen to attempt a reconstruction of the cabinet. Almost all of the parties recommended a new cabinet if a reconstruction failed, to avoid new elections. Options mentioned for a new cabinet where KVP–ARP–CHU, KVP–PvdA–ARP and KVP–VVD–CHU. The PvdA was reluctant to govern with the confessional parties, after events during the 1963 cabinet formation. Vice-President of the Council of State Louis Beel, Vondeling, Geertsema and ARP parliamentary leader Jan Smallenbroek recommended KVP parliamentary leader Norbert Schmelzer as informateur, while another four adviser had recommended Beel. Schmelzer had recommended a VVD informateur, following the motto "he who breaks, pays", but he was alone in that advice.

== Informateur Schmelzer ==
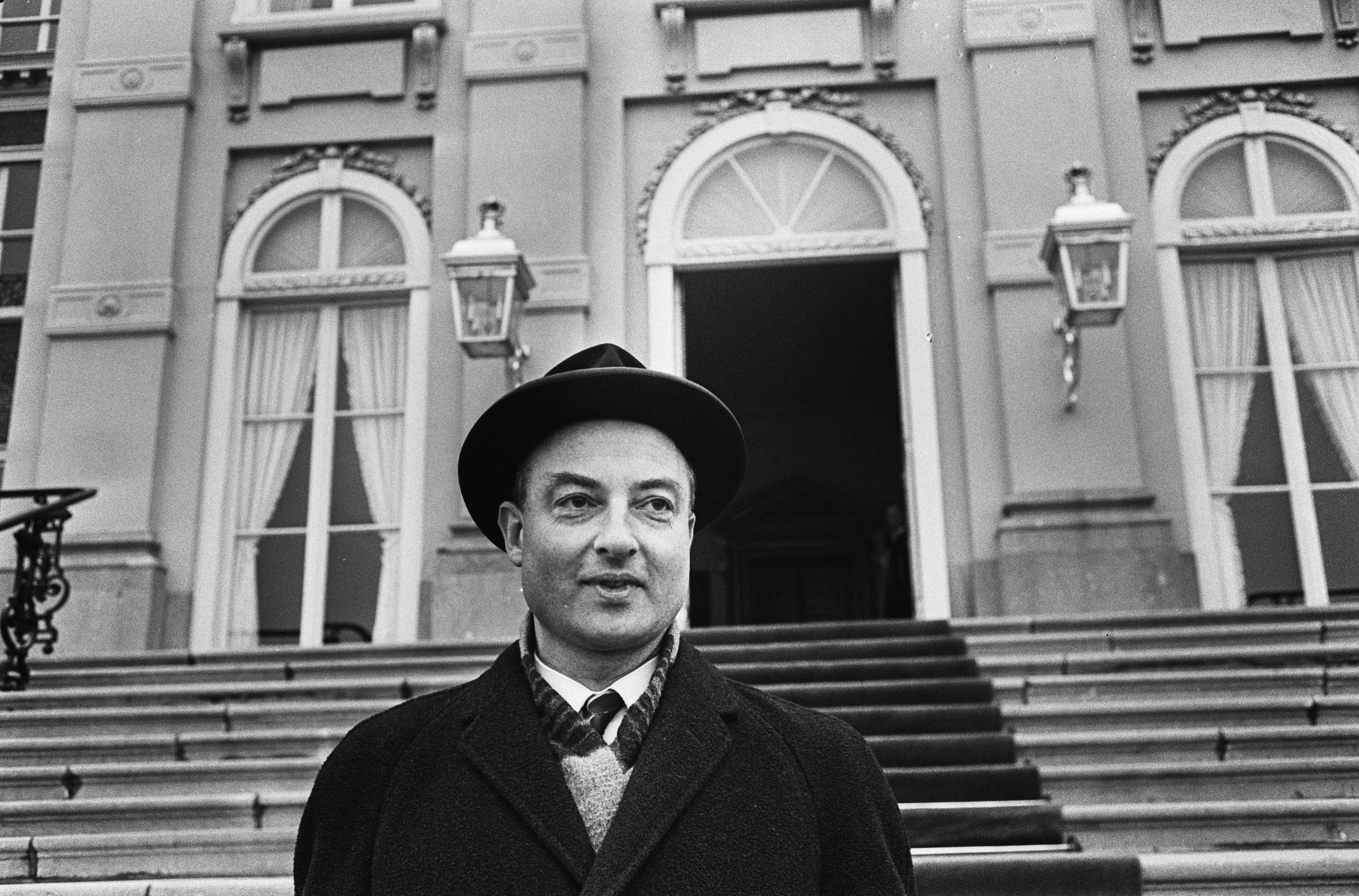
KVP parliamentary leader Norbert Schmelzer leaving the palace after visiting the queen on 1 March, a day before he was appointed formateur

On 2 March, Schmelzer was given the assignment of informateur, limited to reconstructing the Marijnen cabinet. This meant he had to solve the broadcasting issue. He met with Bot for the substantive side, and with Marijnen and ARP deputy prime minister Barend Biesheuvel for the political side. He then met with Geertsema on 8 March, who stated the desires of the VVD. He relayed these desires to the other parliamentary leaders of the coalition. Afterwards, Geertsema claimed he had not given permission to share his (written) desires, although Schmelzer claimed he had gotten permission and this was later supported by both their notes. Kees van der Ploeg - who temporarily replaced Schmelzer as parliamentary leader - and Smallenbroek rejected the VVD desires and interpreted them as demands. The first round of meetings thus only increased the differences between the parties.

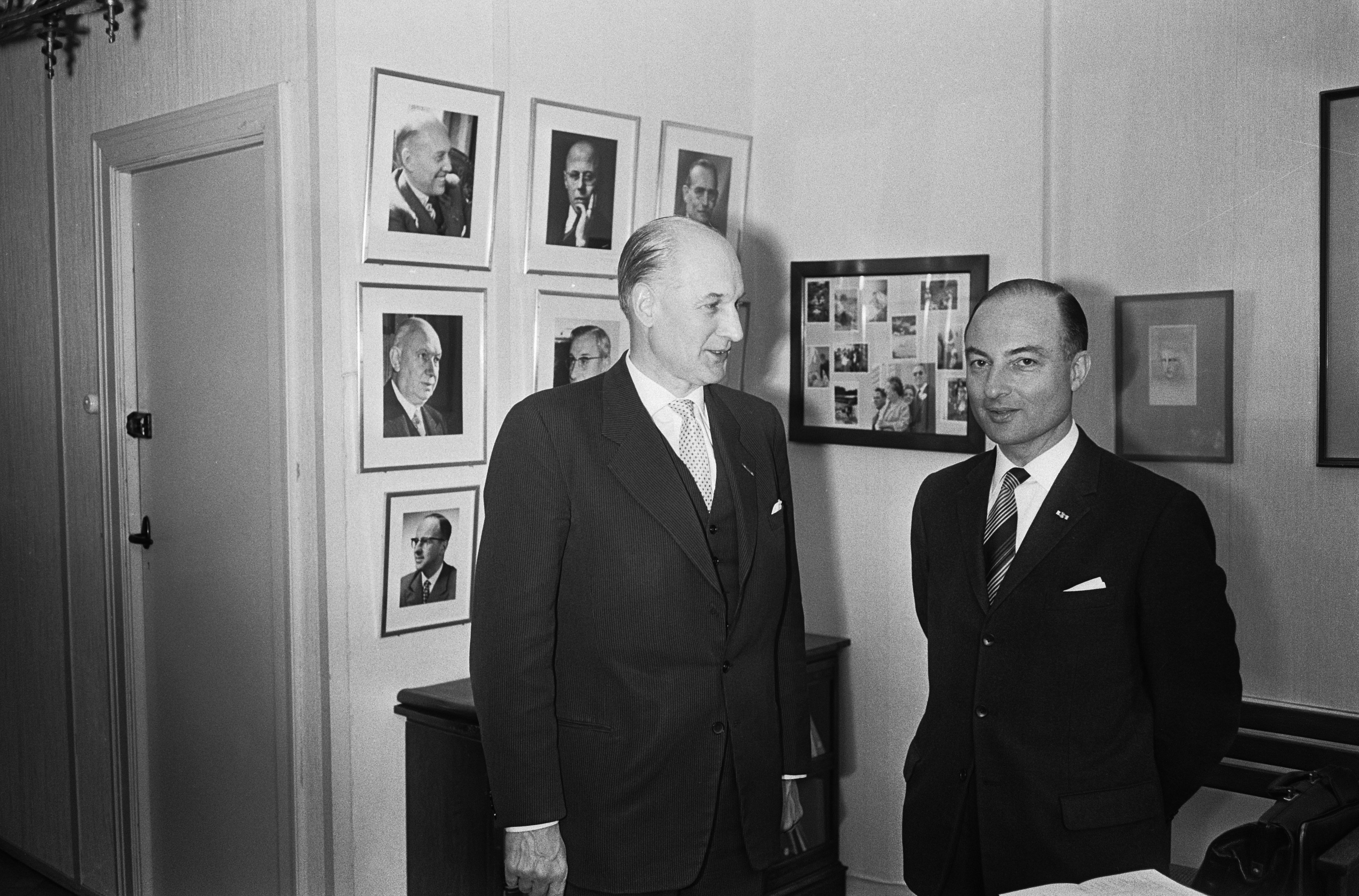
Minister Bot received by informateur Schmelzer on 5 March 1965

Schmelzer then organised a meeting with the parliamentary leaders of KVP, ARP, CHU and VVD. It lasted until the early hours of 12 March. It was at that time nicknamed the "Night of Schmelzer", later renamed to the "first Night of Schmelzer" when the more famous Night of Schmelzer took place in October 1966. The parties were not able to bridge the differences during that meeting. The next day, Schmelzer handed in his assignment. Not only did he note that reconstruction was not possible, he also indicated that a coalition of KVP, ARP and CHU was not possible because CHU sided with VVD in the discussion. Schmelzer received blame for how he acted as informateur, among other things because he only took inventory of the differences, but did not come up with solutions to bridge those differences.

== Formateur Cals ==
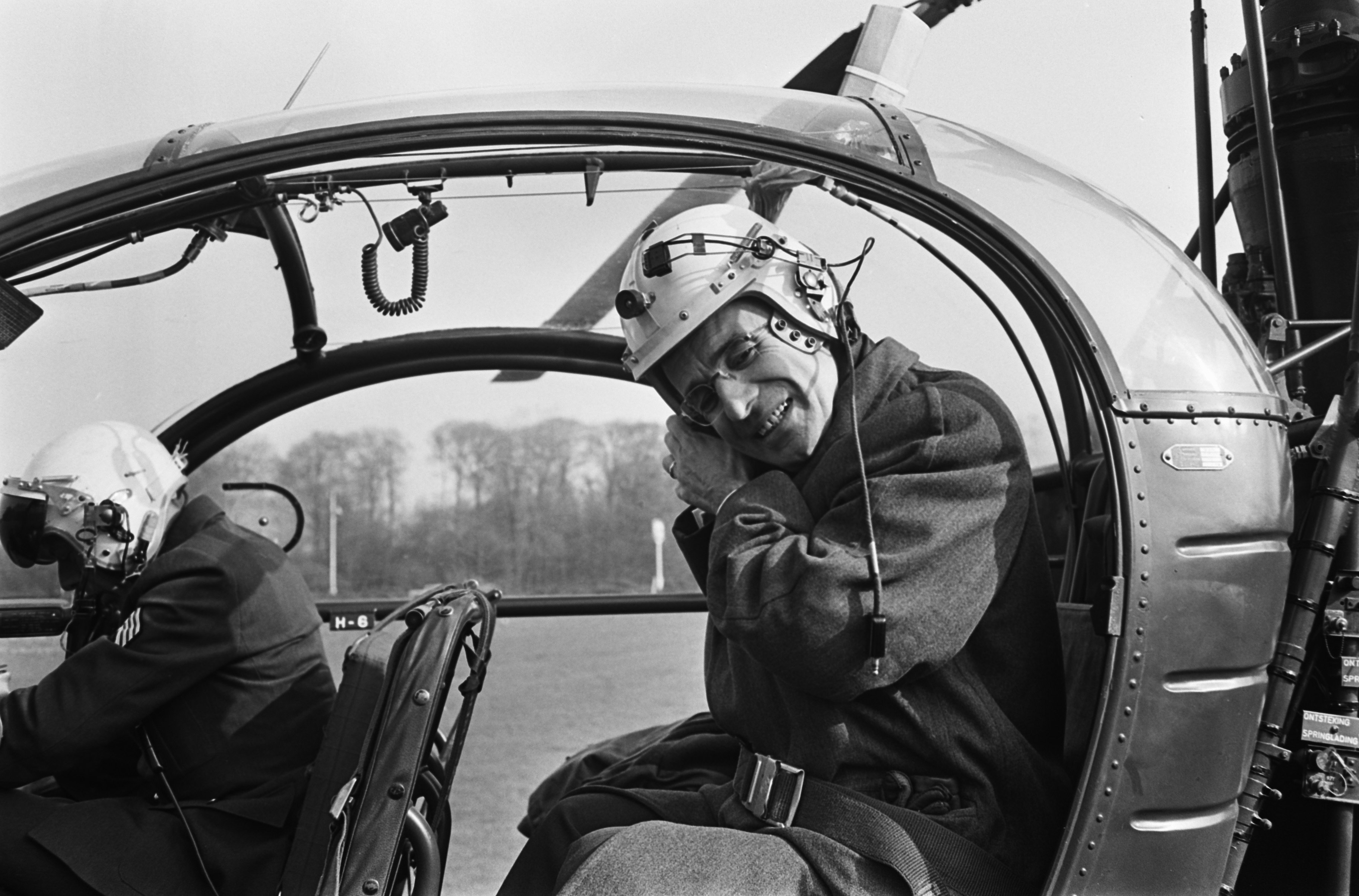
Formateur Jo Cals transported by an army helictoper to report about his progress to the queen at Soestdijk Palace

The situation left practically no other option than a coalition with the PvdA, despite hesitations from both the PvdA and the confessional parties. During the second consultation round, Vondeling advised the queen to appoint Schmelzer as formateur, focusing first on forming a coalition with only the KVP, ARP, and CHU. Geertsema also recommended Schmelzer as formateur but emphasised a coalition with the PvdA. CHU leader Henk Beernink believed that the 76 seats held by the KVP, ARP, and CHU were insufficient and preferred to refusing to discharge the cabinet. Schmelzer, having returned as parliamentary leader, suggested naming a member of the CHU as formateur, likely blaming them for the crisis as well. The CHU formateur would then focus on forming a cabinet with the KVP, PvdA, ARP, and CHU. All other leaders also pointed to Schmelzer, but he refused.

As an alternative, Schmelzer suggested KVP MP and former minister Jo Cals on 13 March, who had supported cooperation with the PvdA in 1963. Although Cals was hesitant and his wife felt he should refuse, he decided to accept the role the next day. On that same day, he was flown back by government plane from Rome, where he had travelled the previous day, and met with the queen. Cals was reluctant because most recommendations had pointed to Schmelzer, and he did not want to become prime minister, a likely outcome if he became formateur. He requested to be appointed as informateur instead, but Juliana refused. Ultimately, Cals yielded and was appointed formateur with the broad assignment to "form a cabinet that could count on fruitful cooperation with parliament".

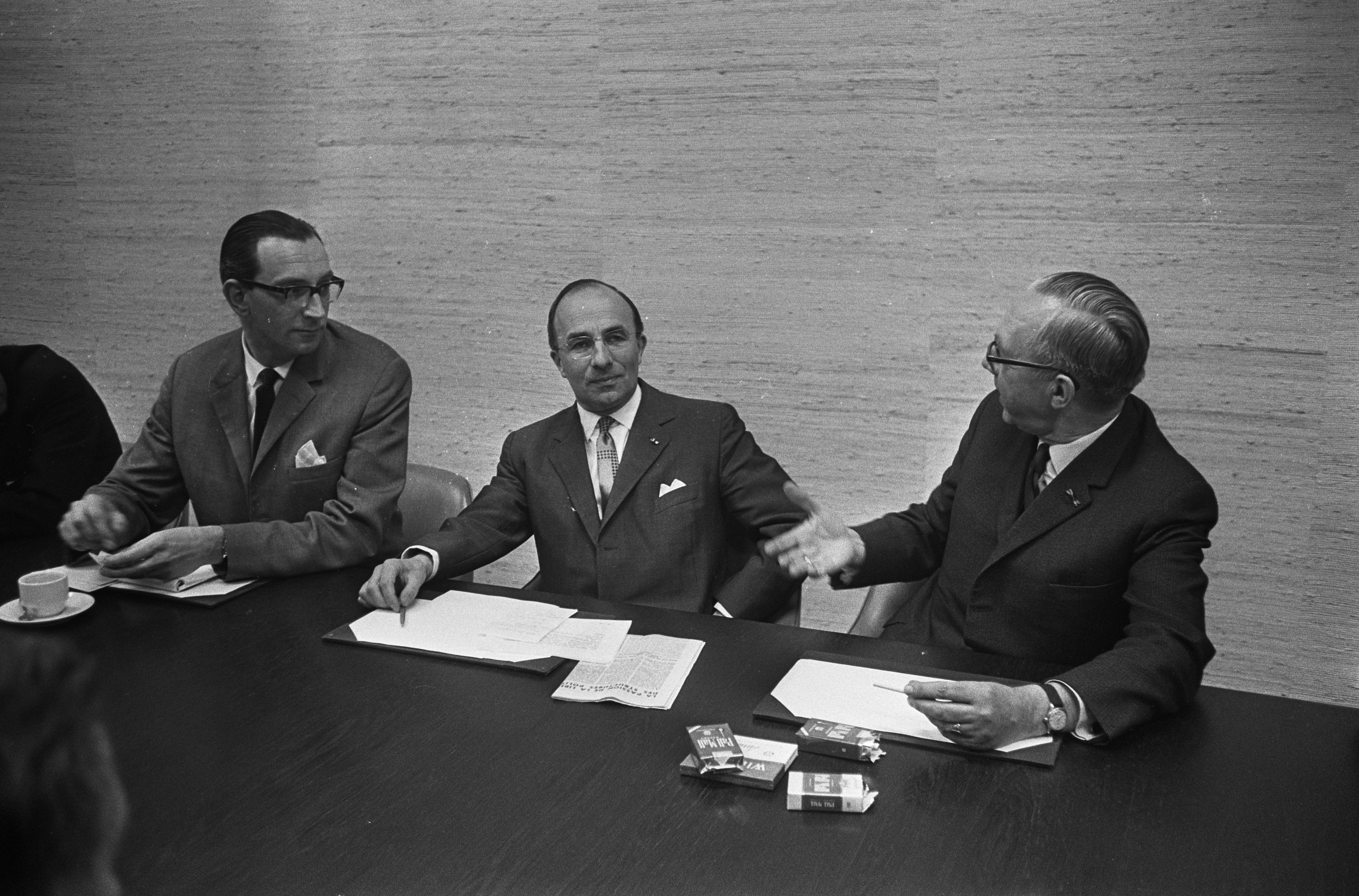
Formateur Jo Cals (middle) and director of the Government Information Service, Gerrit Jan Lammers (right), during a press conference on 15 March

Cals first met with Marijnen and Beel and concluded that reconstruction was not feasible. He then met with his parliamentary leader Schmelzer, who preferred a coalition with the PvdA, ARP, and CHU. The KVP was flexible on the participation of the ARP or CHU but would reconsider if both opted out. Vondeling emphasised that he did not want a repeat of the 1963 cabinet formation and that the CHU was only welcome if they agreed to the broadcasting policy. Additionally, Vondeling stated that Marijnen would not be acceptable as prime minister. Cals and Geertsema discussed the shortcomings of Schmelzer's previous assignment, with Geertsema open to reconstructing the cabinet if a coalition with the PvdA failed.

Smallenbroek supported a cabinet comprising the KVP, PvdA, ARP, and CHU, and was open to a coalition without the CHU. He wanted two ministers if the CHU joined, or three if the ARP left, which would be problematic as it would leave too few posts for the PvdA. Beernink was much less enthusiastic about a coalition with the PvdA. By the end of the meeting, he agreed to cooperate but stated that the CHU's decision would depend on the government programme and the distribution of ministerial posts. Like the ARP, he also demanded two ministerial positions.

=== Settling the broadcasting policy ===
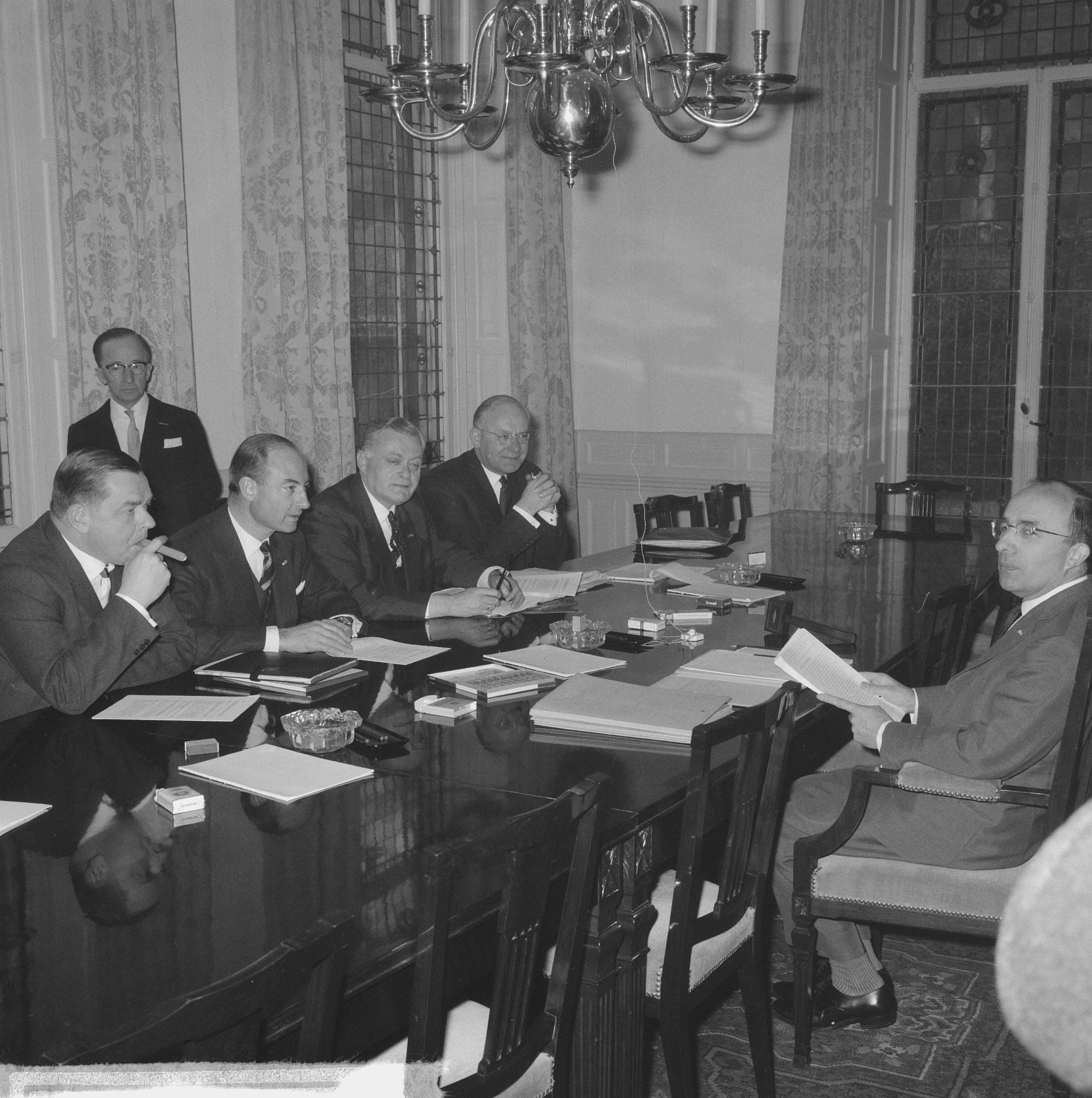
Henk Beernink, Norbert Schmelzer, Jan Smallenbroek, Anne Vondeling opposite formateur Jo Cals on 23 March

Cals and the parliamentary leaders agreed to settle the broadcasting policy before moving on to other discussions. On 23 March, Cals met with Marijnen and Bot, presenting a proposal based on Bot's earlier suggestion. While the proposal made significant progress, it fell short of an agreement. Beernink wanted to address the broadcasting policy after discussing the rest of the program and the ministerial distribution, which the other leaders found unacceptable. They were willing to let a minority of the CHU members dissent on the broadcasting policy, but not Beernink himself. This was unacceptable for Beernink, due to his role as a board member of a candidate broadcaster opposing the arrangement. Beernink consulted his parliamentary group, who were unwilling to commit to the broadcasting policy, even if other demands were met. This led to the CHU withdrawing from the negotiations. After deliberation, the ARP unanimously agreed to continue. The remaining parties quickly reached an agreement on the broadcasting policy.

=== Negotiations with KVP, PvdA and ARP ===
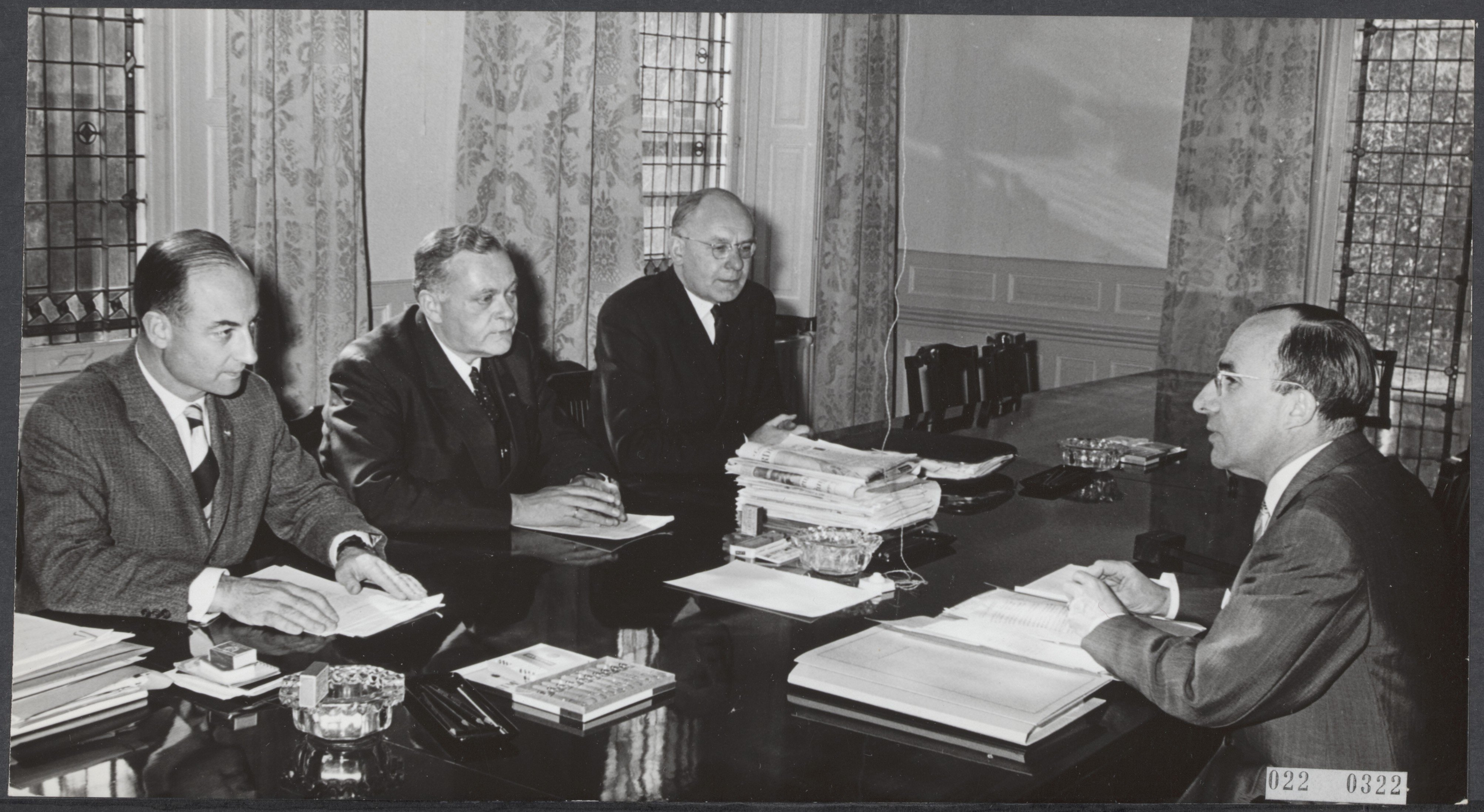
Norbert Schmelzer, Jan Smallenbroek, Anne Vondeling opposite formateur Jo Cals on 25 March, after CHU had left the negotiations

On 26 March, the negotiators discussed the financial framework for the next two years, including housing construction and rental policy, without encountering any obstacles. The PvdA secured important points, such as speculation tax and land policy. On 31 March, Cals informed the queen that the parties had reached agreement on key topics.

==== Search for prime minister ====
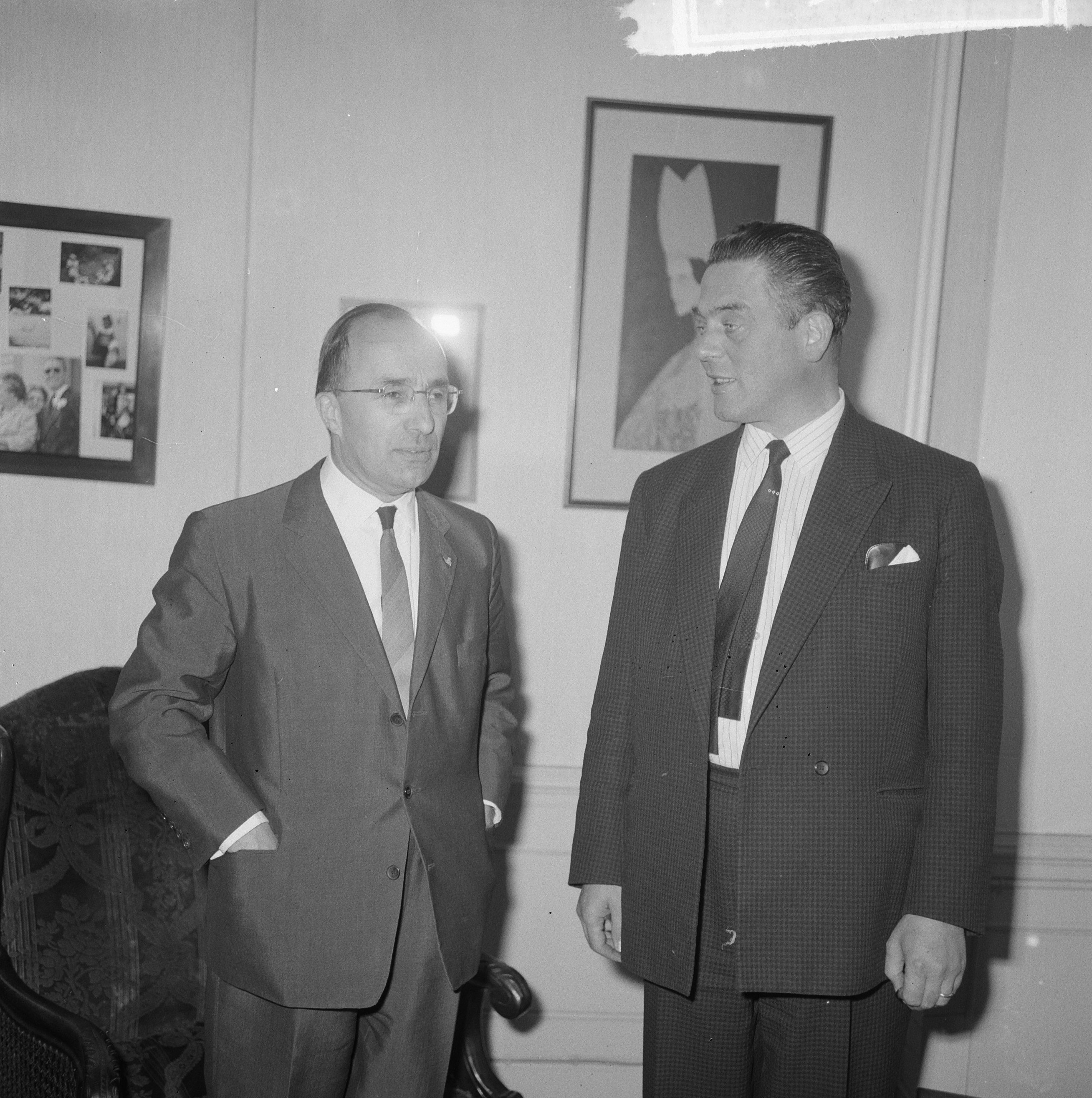
Formateur Jo Cals meeting with prime minister Victor Marijnen on 16 March

A more challenging issue was deciding on the prime minister. Vondeling emphasised on 28 March that the PvdA preferred a different prime minister, citing the concern over transitioning from a center-right to a center-left cabinet. Smallenbroek concurred, while Schmelzer disagreed. Despite this, all three leaders urged Cals to accept the role of prime minister, as requested by the queen previously, but he declined. Cals met with Marijnen to inform him that he could not continue as prime minister. Cals drafted a statement to ensure Marijnen's reputation remained intact and avoid framing the decision as conceding to the PvdA. Cals initially approached KVP Defence Minister Piet de Jong for the position of prime minister, but he considered himself not yet prepared. Cals then suggested Biesheuvel, but this was met with opposition from both the KVP and PvdA. Eventually, Cals relented and agreed to accept the job of prime minister himself.

==== Distribution of ministers ====
The parties then moved onto the distribution of ministers on 1 April. They soon agreed that PvdA and KVP would each get five ministers and ARP three. Schmelzer had wanted a sixth minister for KVP. Schmelzer also wanted to keep the incumbent cabinet members on their post, but Vondeling disagreed. The PvdA claimed Economic Affairs and Foreign Affairs, while the ARP desired Agriculture and Interior. CHU minister of Economic Affairs Koos Andriessen had wanted to remain, despite his party not supporting the cabinet. Although Schmelzer and Smallenbroek were sympathetic, Vondeling refused and subsequently Cals declined Andriessen's offer. Bot, seen as a weak minister, was dropped and Education was subsequently claimed by ARP. Minister of Social Affairs Gerard Veldkamp (KVP) remained, not because he was popular with his own party, but with the trade unions.

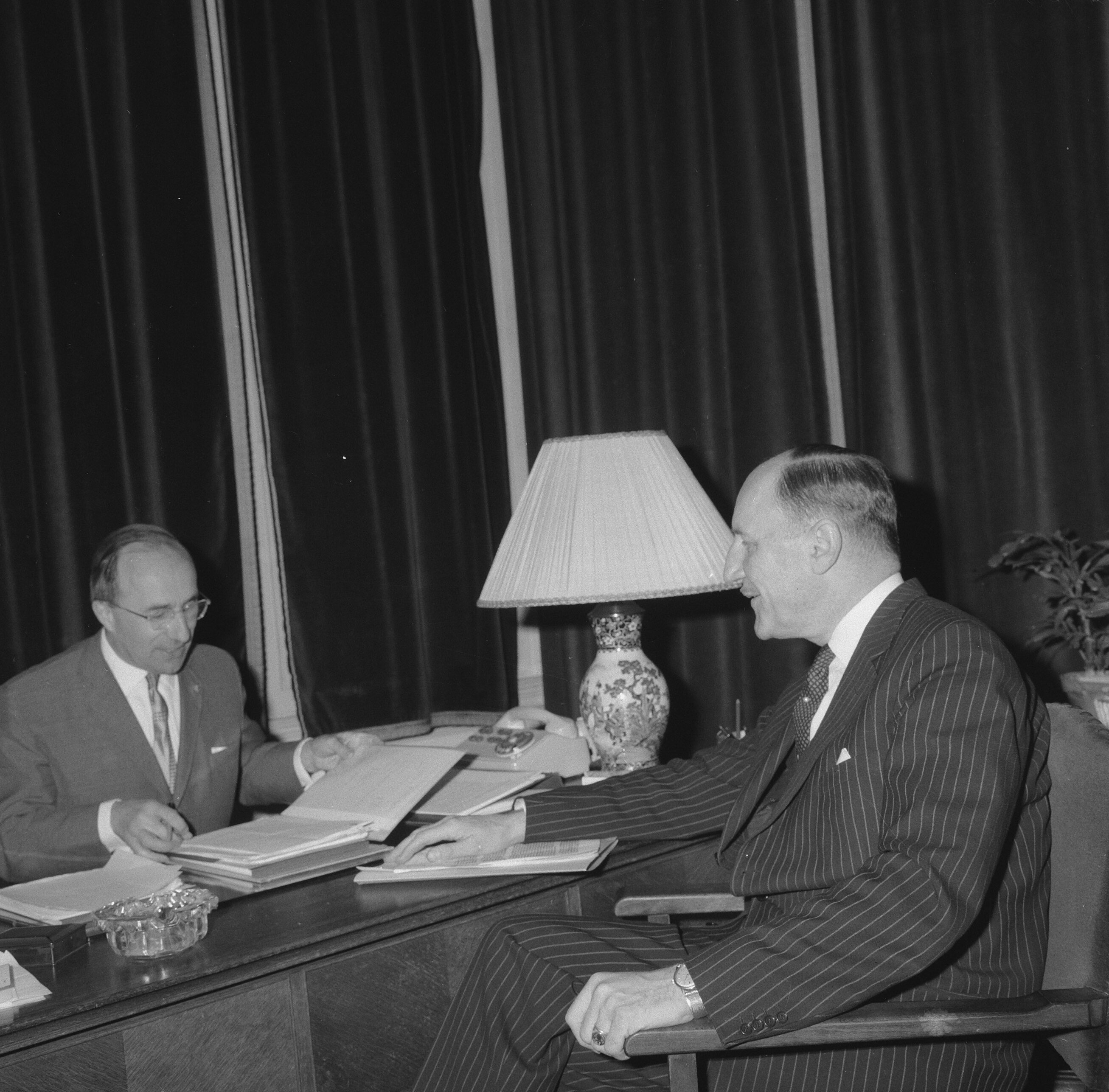
Formateur Jo Cals (l) meeting with Minister of Foreign Affairs Joseph Luns on 8 April

More problematic was the PvdA's claim on Foreign Affairs, where the KVP had wanted to keep their popular minister Joseph Luns. This became more complicated when Vondeling revealed that he himself wanted to replace Luns, whom Vondeling had often criticised. Cals attempted to break the deadlock by proposing that all negotiators would remain in the House, including himself if the others desired. The PvdA finally gave in, if the KVP committed to replacing Luns after the next elections and if an additional PvdA state secretary would be added to his ministry.

None of the parties laid claim to the Ministry of Finance. The PvdA and ARP believed it should go to the KVP, but Schmelzer could not find a suitable candidate. Schmelzer proposed that Vondeling take on the role of Finance Minister himself, yet he also worried about the PvdA gaining too much influence if they controlled both Economic Affairs and Finance – the two key ministries in the so-called "socio-economic triangle." Cals tried convincing Schmelzer that they could not take away a ministry PvdA desired in exchange for one they did not. Cals threatened to end the formation if Schmelzer called for a parliamentary group meeting, which he had planned to do. They agreed to both meet with former KVP leader Carl Romme, who convinced Schmelzer to give in. In exchange, KVP would get a Minister for Aid to Developing Countries, a sixth post awarded to Bot.

==== Finalisation ====
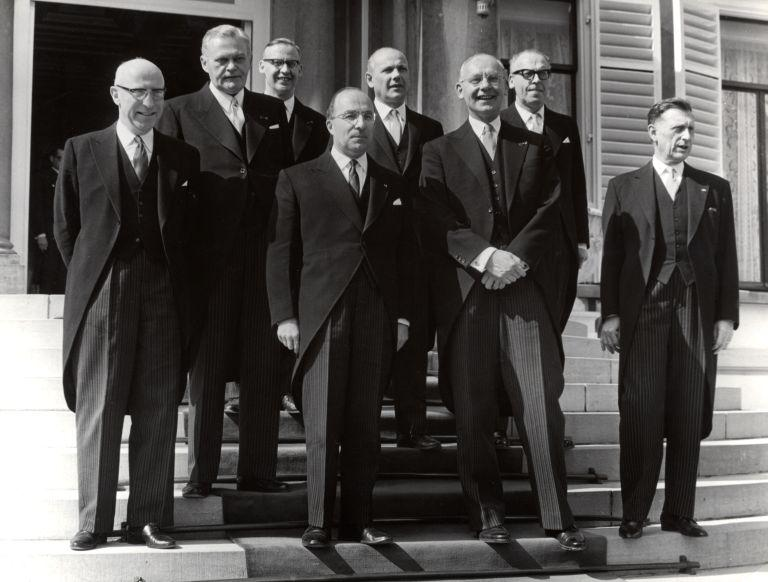
Ministers of the Cals cabinet at the stairs of Soestdijk Palace after having been sworn in on 14 April. From left to right: Ivo Samkalden, Jan Smallenbroek, Isaäc Arend Diepenhorst, Jo Cals, Joop den Uyl, Anne Vondeling, Maarten Vrolijk and Ko Suurhoff

The PvdA nearly unanimously supported the negotiation result. Only former parliamentary leader Marinus van der Goes van Naters opposed it, because he had preferred new elections. The ARP was also supportive. The KVP on the other hand was less supportive, and only approved because Schmelzer saw a refusal as a loss of confidence in his leadership. The Cals cabinet was sworn in on 14 July 1965.

== Aftermath ==
Two weeks after being sworn in, Cals spoke the government policy statement in the House of Representatives. While selecting was already difficult, it took until 22 July until all state secretaries had been sworn in.

The Cals cabinet resigned on 15 October 1966 after the Night of Schmelzer, when the KVP in the House led by Schmelzer was critical of the 1967 budget. After a cabinet formation, the rump cabinet Zijlstra comprising the KVP and ARP. This was the third and final cabinet, based on the same election results of 1963.
