= Cals cabinet =

Dutch cabinet, 1965 to 1966

- Cabinet of the Netherlands

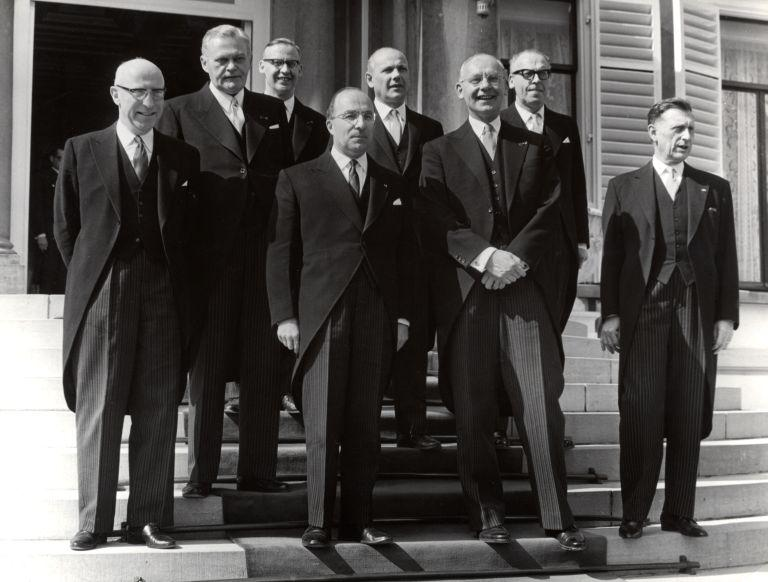
- The installation of the Cals cabinet on 14 April 1965
- Date formed: 14 April 1965
- Date dissolved: 22 November 1966; 1 year, 222 days in office (Demissionary from 14 October 1966)

People and organisations
- Monarch: Queen Juliana
- Prime Minister: Jo Cals
- Deputy Prime Minister: Anne Vondeling; Barend Biesheuvel
- No. of ministers: 14
- Ministers removed: 1
- Total no. of members: 15
- Member party: Catholic People's Party (KVP); Labour Party (PvdA); Anti-Revolutionary Party (ARP)
- Status in legislature: Centre-left; Majority government

History
- Legislature terms: 1963–1967
- Incoming formation: 1965 formation
- Outgoing formation: 1966 formation
- Predecessor: Marijnen cabinet
- Successor: Zijlstra cabinet

The Cals cabinet was the executive branch of the Dutch Government from 14 April 1965 until 22 November 1966. The cabinet was formed by the Christian-democratic Catholic People's Party (KVP) and Anti-Revolutionary Party (ARP) and the social-democratic Labour Party (PvdA) after the fall of the previous Cabinet Marijnen. The cabinet was a Centre-left coalition and had a substantial majority in the House of Representatives; prominent Catholic politician Jo Cals, a former Minister of Education, served as Prime Minister. Labour Leader Anne Vondeling served as Deputy Prime Minister and Minister of Finance, Protestant Leader Barend Biesheuvel continued as Deputy Prime Minister, Minister of Agriculture and Fisheries and the responsibility for Suriname and Netherlands Antilles Affairs from previous cabinet.

The cabinet served in the middle of the tumultuous 1960s. Domestically it had to deal with the counterculture and implemented several major social reforms to social security, as well as closing the mines in Limburg and stimulating urban development in the Randstad. Internationally, the protests against the Vietnam War were a major point of attention. The cabinet suffered several major internal and external conflicts, including multiple cabinet resignations. The cabinet fell just 18 months into its term on 14 October 1966, following the Night of Schmelzer when Catholic Leader Norbert Schmelzer proposed a counter-motion that called for stronger austerity measures to reduce the deficit than those the cabinet had itself proposed. Prime Minister Cals saw this as an indirect motion of no confidence from his own party, and announced his resignation; the cabinet continued in a demissionary capacity until it was replaced by the caretaker Cabinet Zijlstra.

== Formation ==
After the fall of the Marijnen cabinet, the confessional parties did not want snap elections because those could centre on the introduction of commercial television, the issue that led to the fall of the former cabinet. So a new cabinet was formed on the basis of the existing situation. A continuation of the Marijnen cabinet was considered to have too narrow a basis, so PvdA was asked to join in. As a result, CHU stepped out. But previous frictions between PvdA and KVP were overcome because there was a desire to form a cabinet fast, which was indeed done, in just over a month.

== Term ==
After two decades of economic growth, this cabinet experienced a slight recession. Plans to build sports halls, roads and houses had to be tempered. In Limburg the coal mines were closed, and plans were devised to educate and re-employ the former miners.

There was also social unrest, which became apparent in the Provo movement, construction worker protests, riots over the marriage of Princess Beatrix in Amsterdam and the rise of new parties: the Farmers' Party (BP), the Pacifist Socialist Party (PSP), the Reformed Political League (GPV) and the Democrats 66 (D'66). The last party, especially, wished to change the political order..

On 14 October 1966 Norbert Schmelzer the Leader of the Catholic People's Party and Parliamentary leader of the Catholic People's Party in the House of Representatives proposed a Motion of no confidence against the cabinet and Prime Minister Jo Cals. A shocking and surprised action in Dutch politics, it marked the first time that a motion of no confidence was proposed against a cabinet of the same party. The cabinet resigned that evening.

=== Changes ===
On 5 February 1966 State Secretary for Defense for Air Force Affairs Jan Borghouts (KVP) died following a debilitating disease at the age of 55. On 22 June 1966 former Chairman of the United Defence Staff lieutenant general Heije Schaper, who until then had been working as Chief Adjutant in extraordinary service to Queen Juliana was installed as his successor.

On 31 August 1966 Minister of the Interior Jan Smallenbroek (ARP) resigned after he was involved in a traffic incident while driving under the influence. Minister of Justice Ivo Samkalden (PvdA) served as acting Minister of the Interior until 5 September 1966 when Koos Verdam (ARP), who until then had been working as a professor of Roman and International Private Law at the VU University Amsterdam was appointed as his successor.

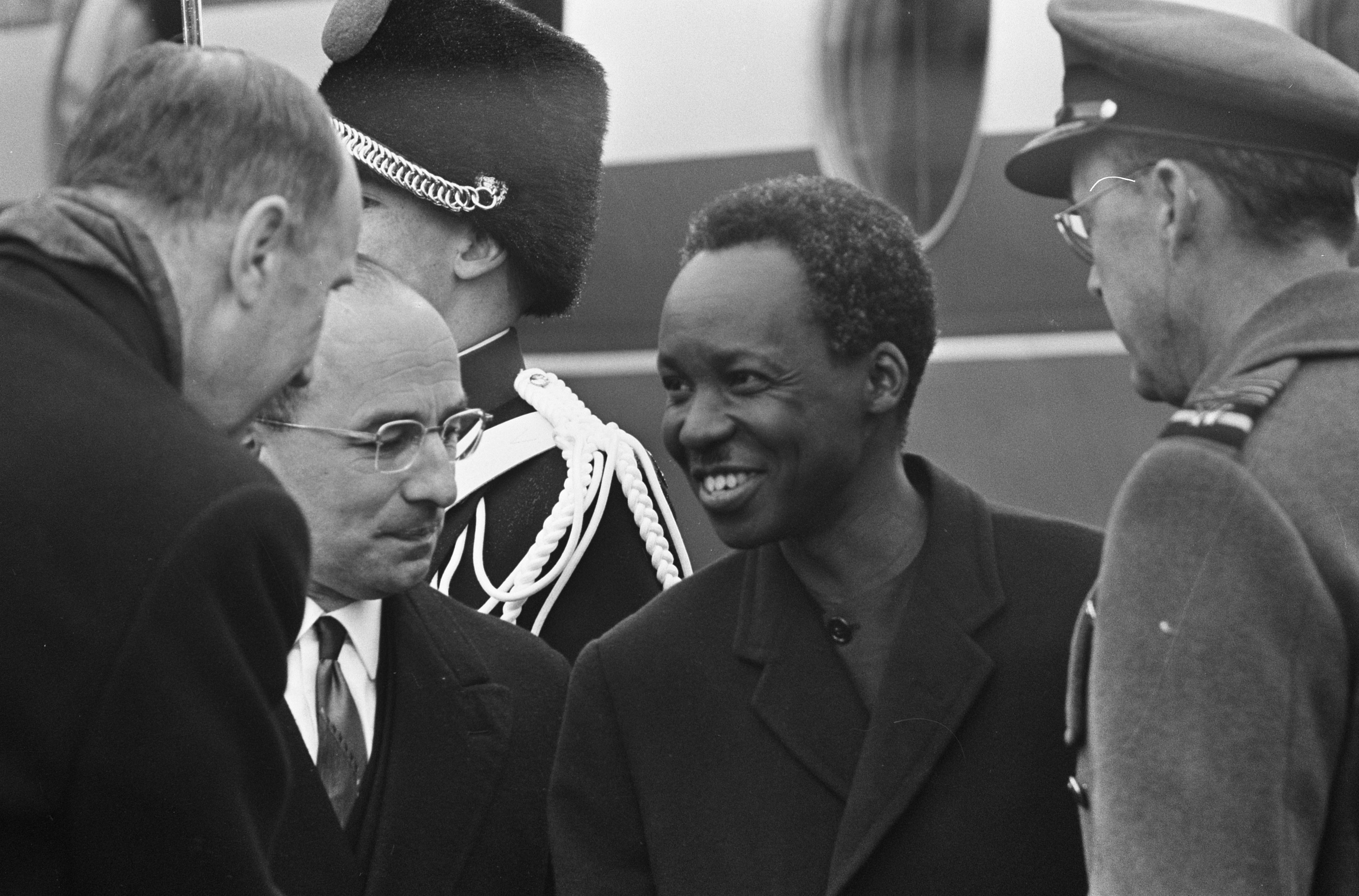
Minister of Foreign Affairs Joseph Luns, Prime Minister Jo Cals, President of Tanzania Julius Nyerere and Prince Bernhard at Soesterberg Air Base on 21 April 1965.

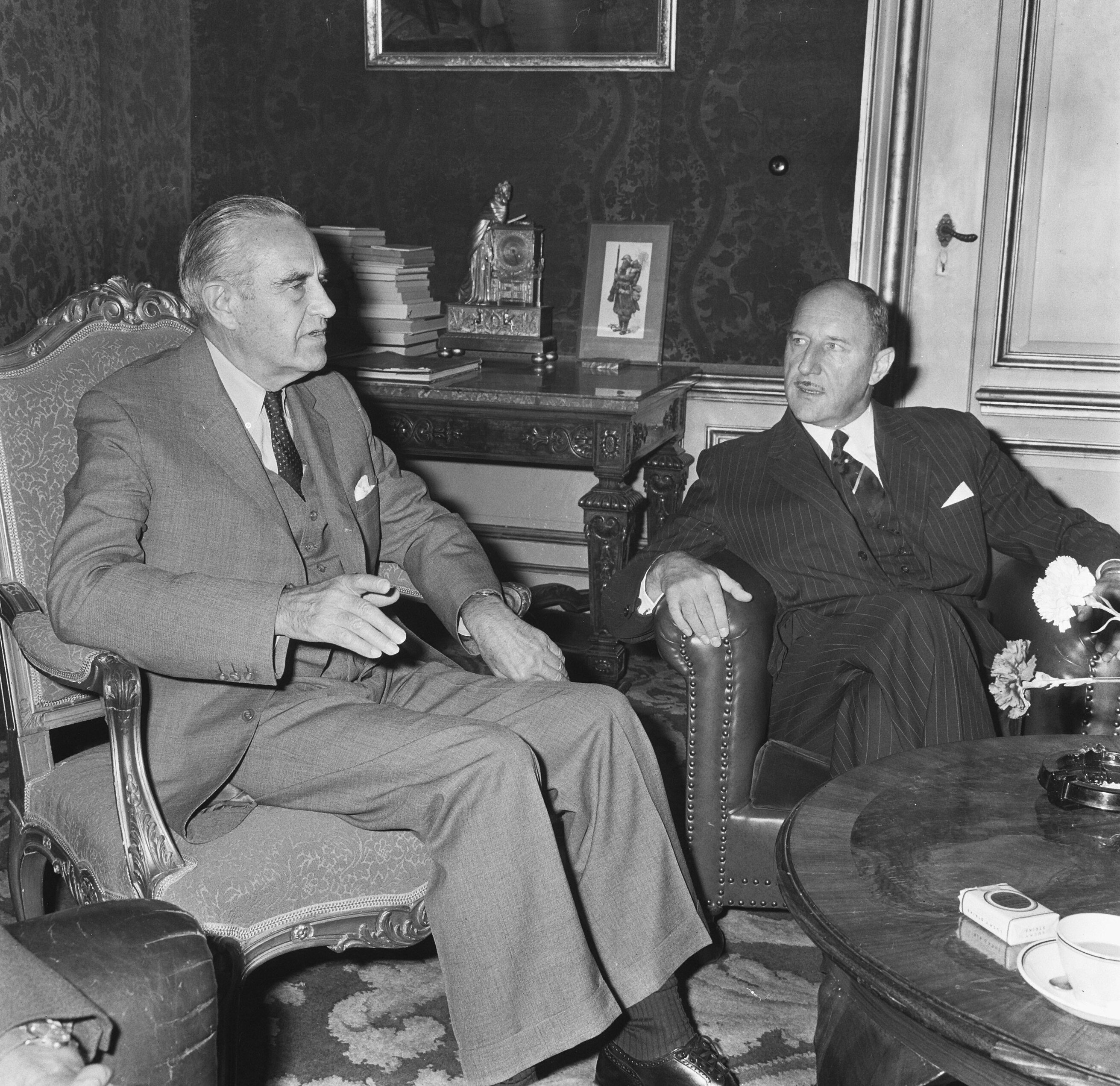
Former United States Under Secretary of State for Political Affairs W. Averell Harriman and Minister of Foreign Affairs Joseph Luns at the Ministry of Foreign Affairs on 3 September 1965.

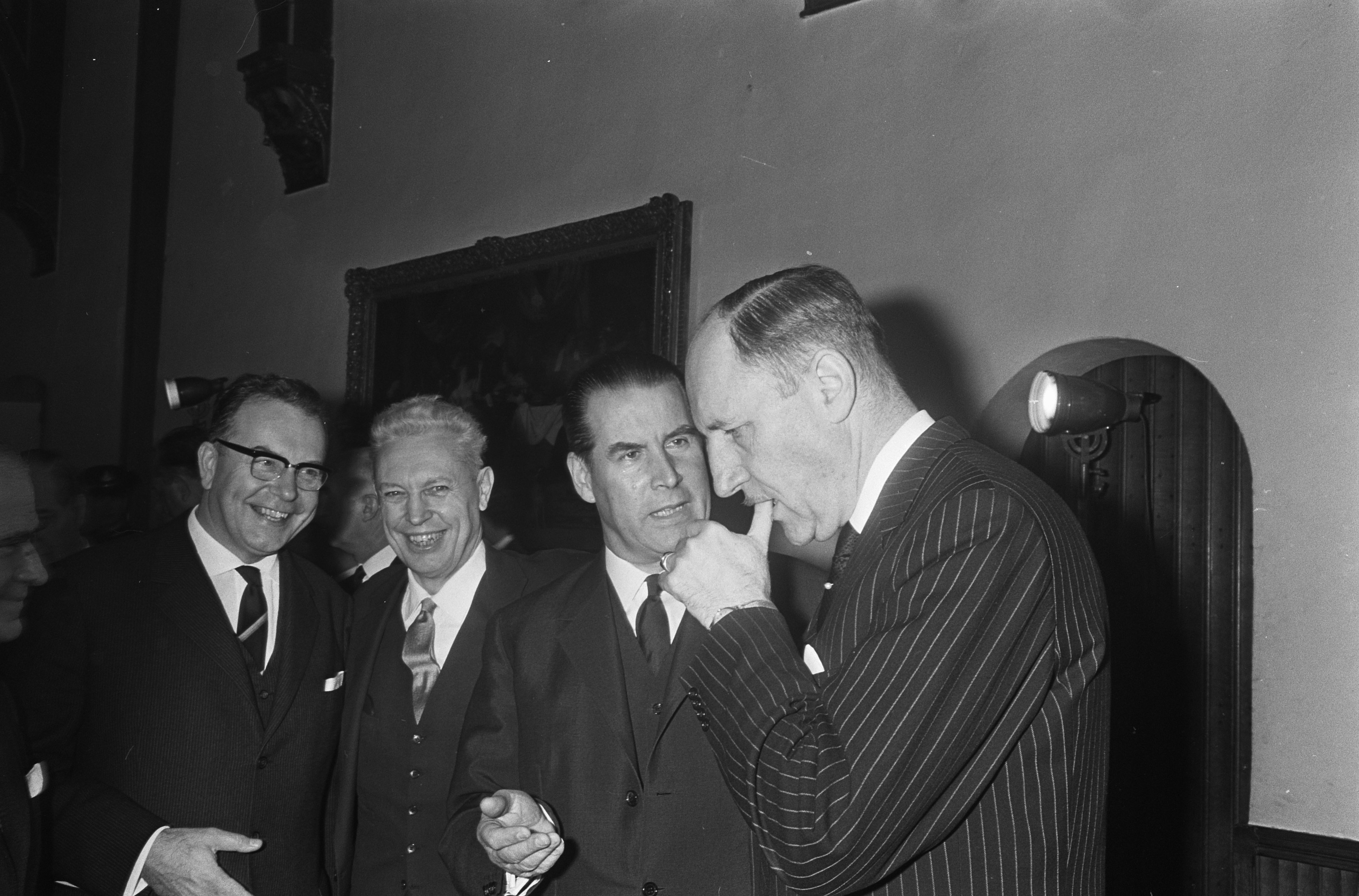
Belgium Minister of Foreign Affairs Hendrik Fayat, West-German Minister for Foreign Affairs Gerhard Schröder and Minister of Foreign Affairs Joseph Luns at a Western European Union conference in Brussels on 4 November 1965.

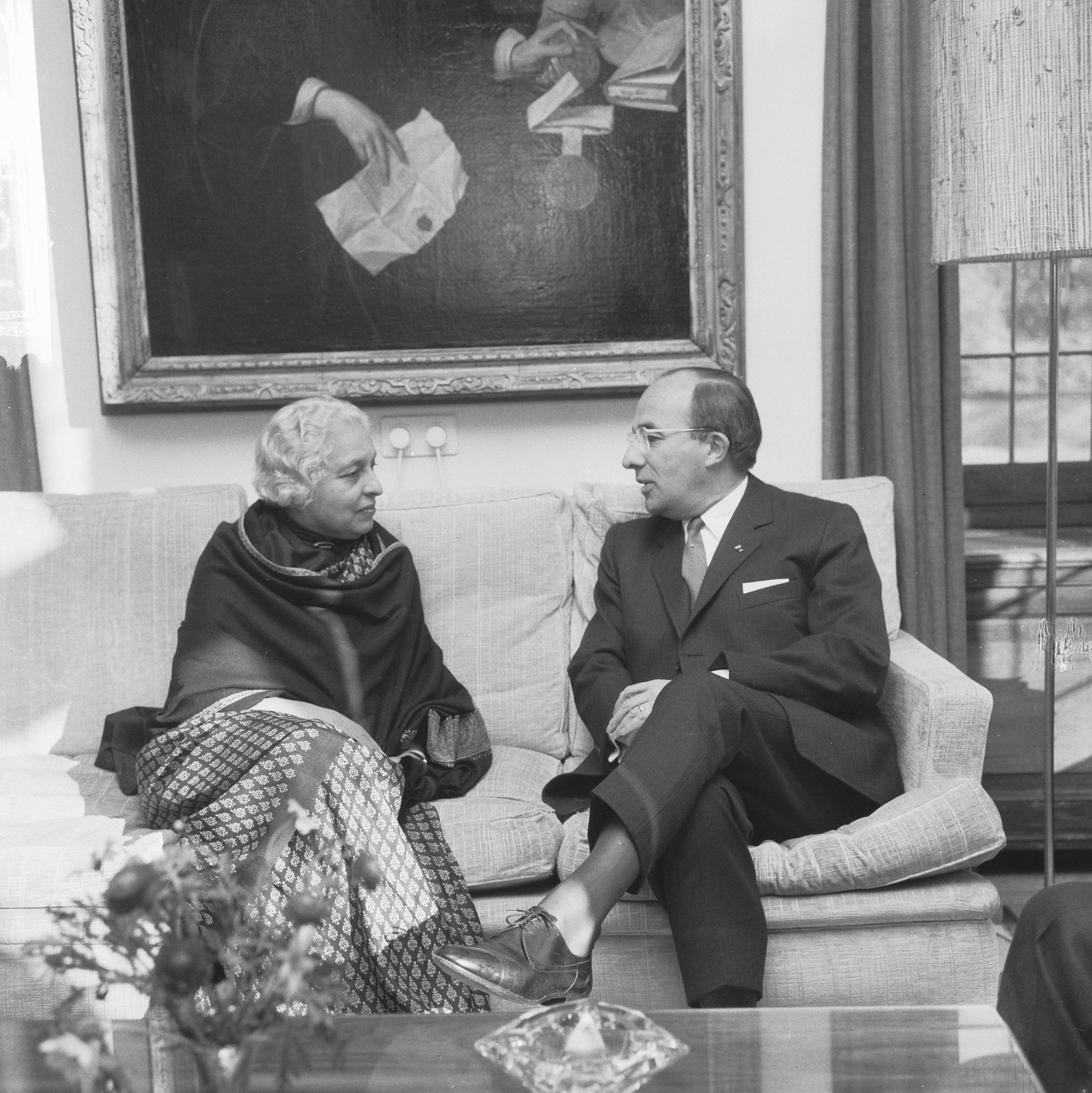
Indian diplomat Vijaya Lakshmi Pandit and Prime Minister Jo Cals at the Catshuis on 12 November 1965.

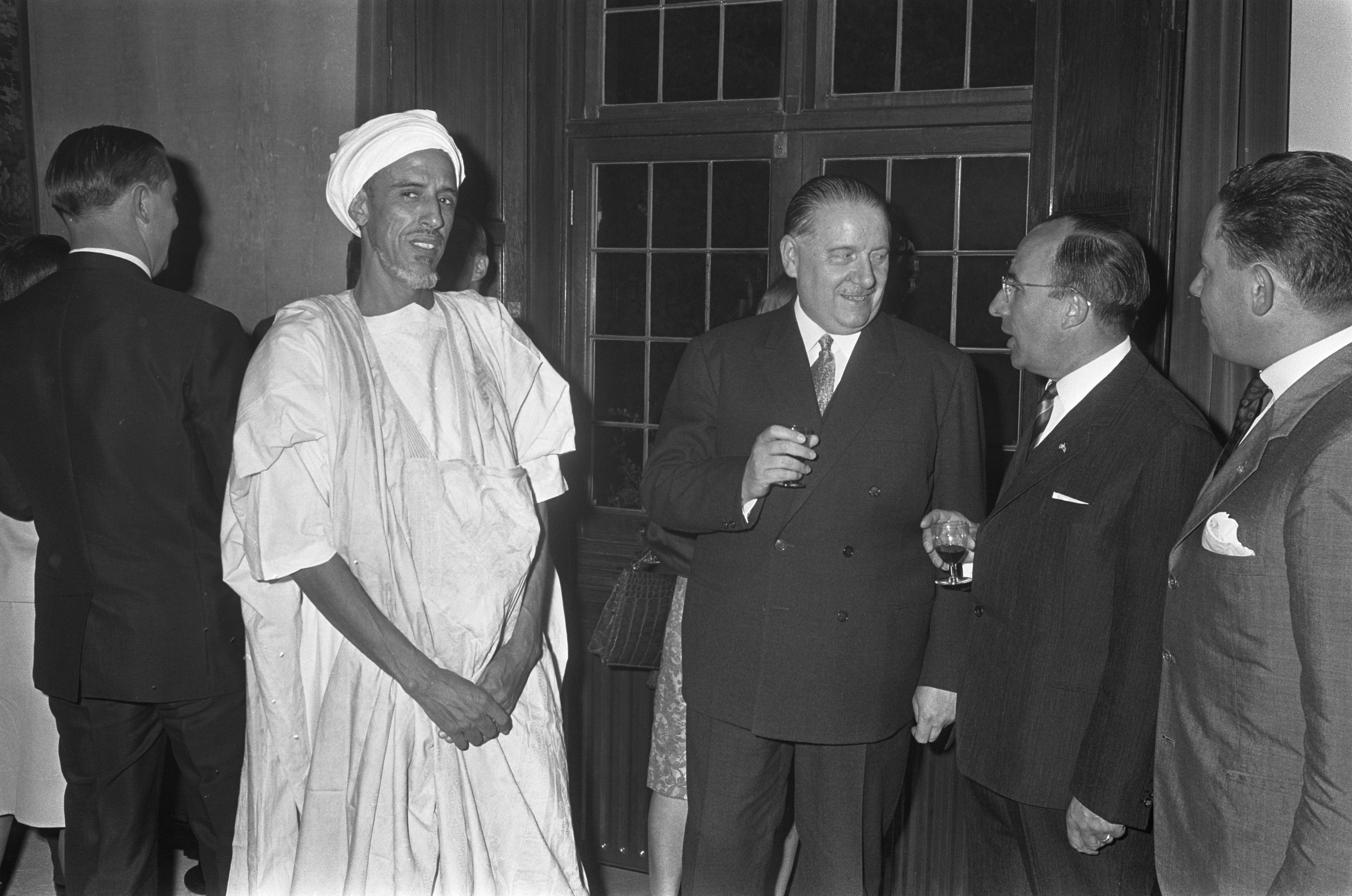
President of the European Parliament Alain Poher and Prime Minister Jo Cals at the Catshuis on 24 May 1966.

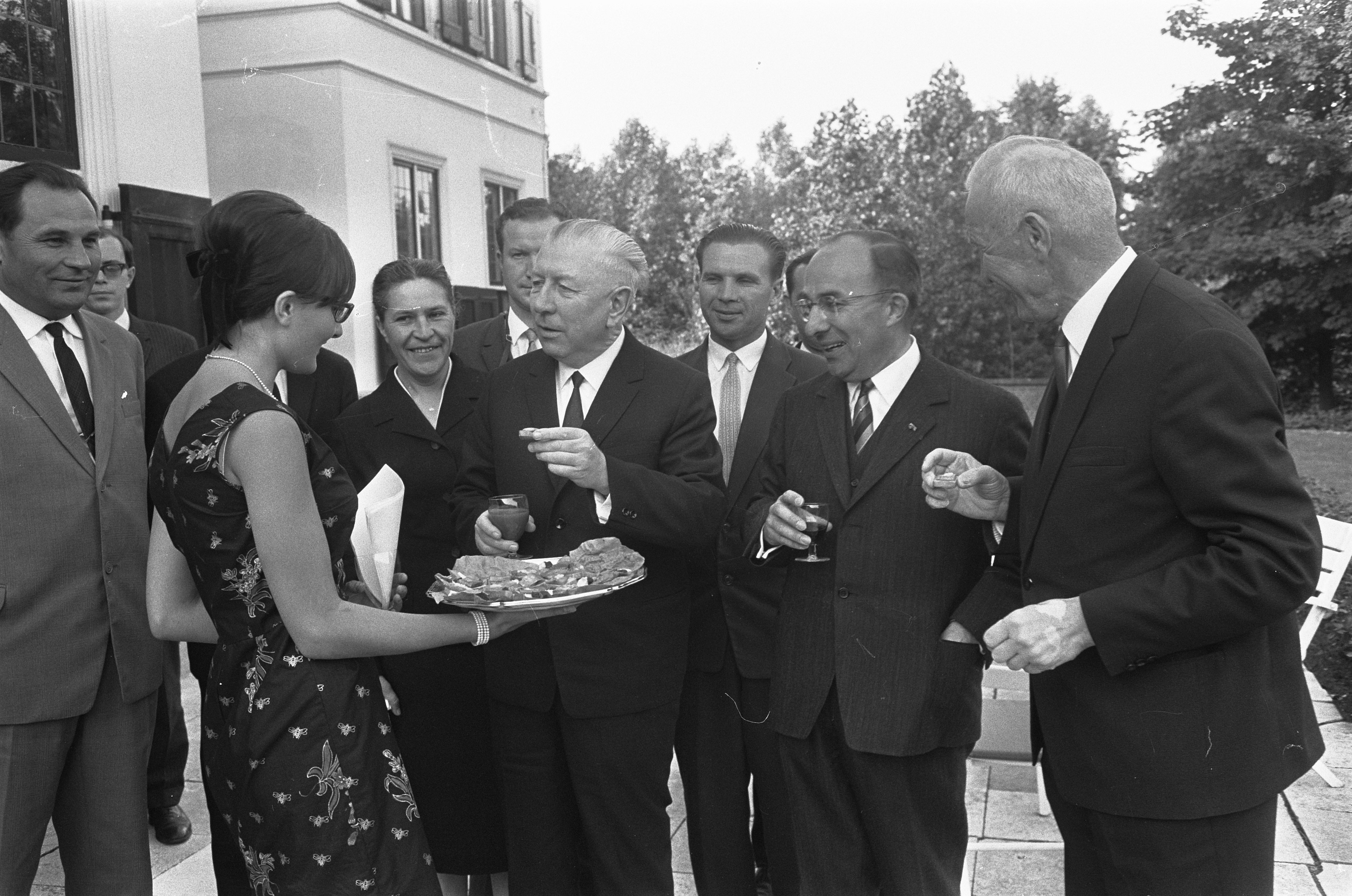
Soviet Ambassador Ivan Tugarinov and Prime Minister Jo Cals at the Catshuis on 30 June 1966.

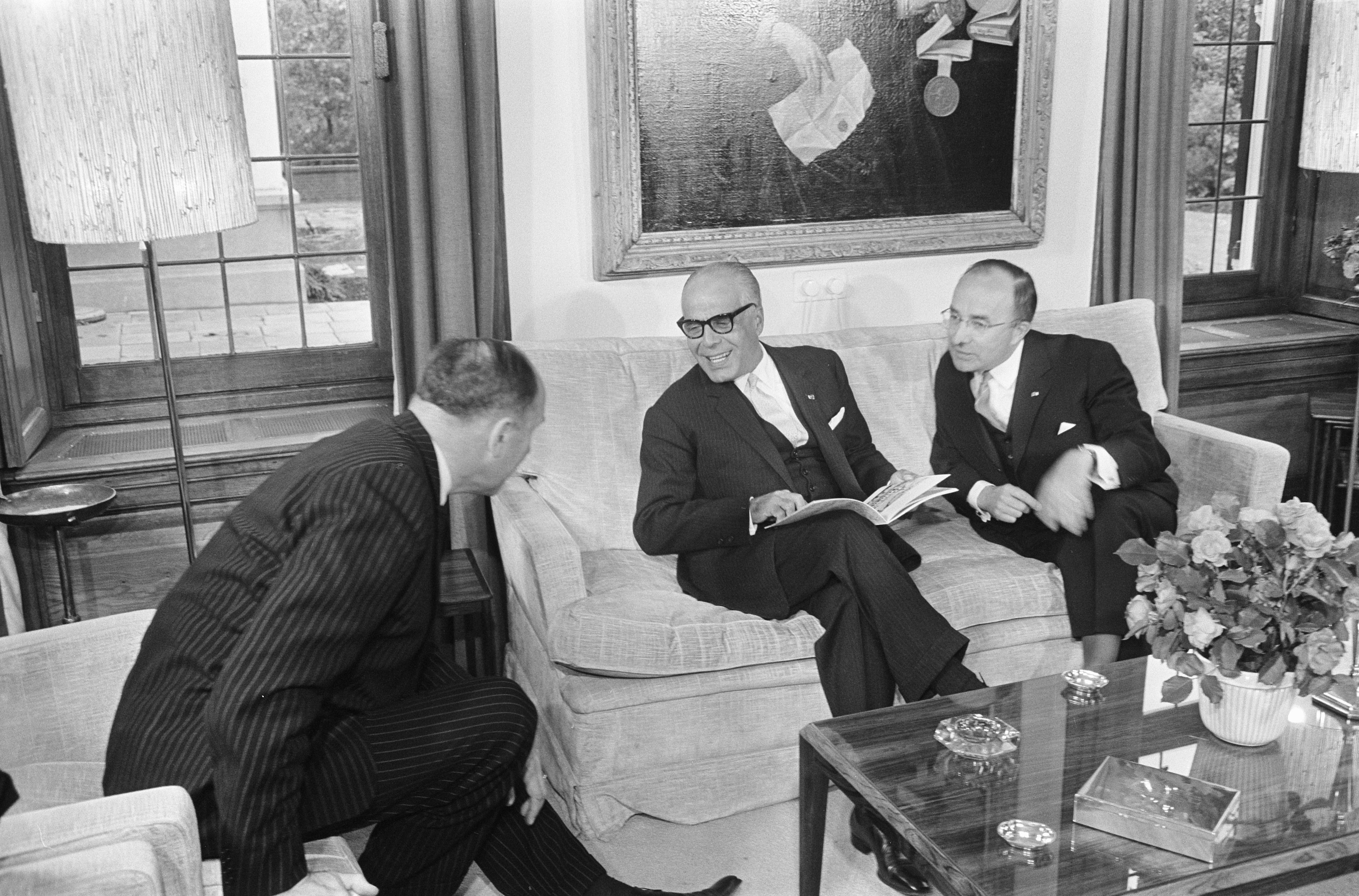
Minister of Foreign Affairs Joseph Luns, President of Tunisia Habib Bourguiba and Prime Minister Jo Cals at the Catshuis on 7 July 1966.

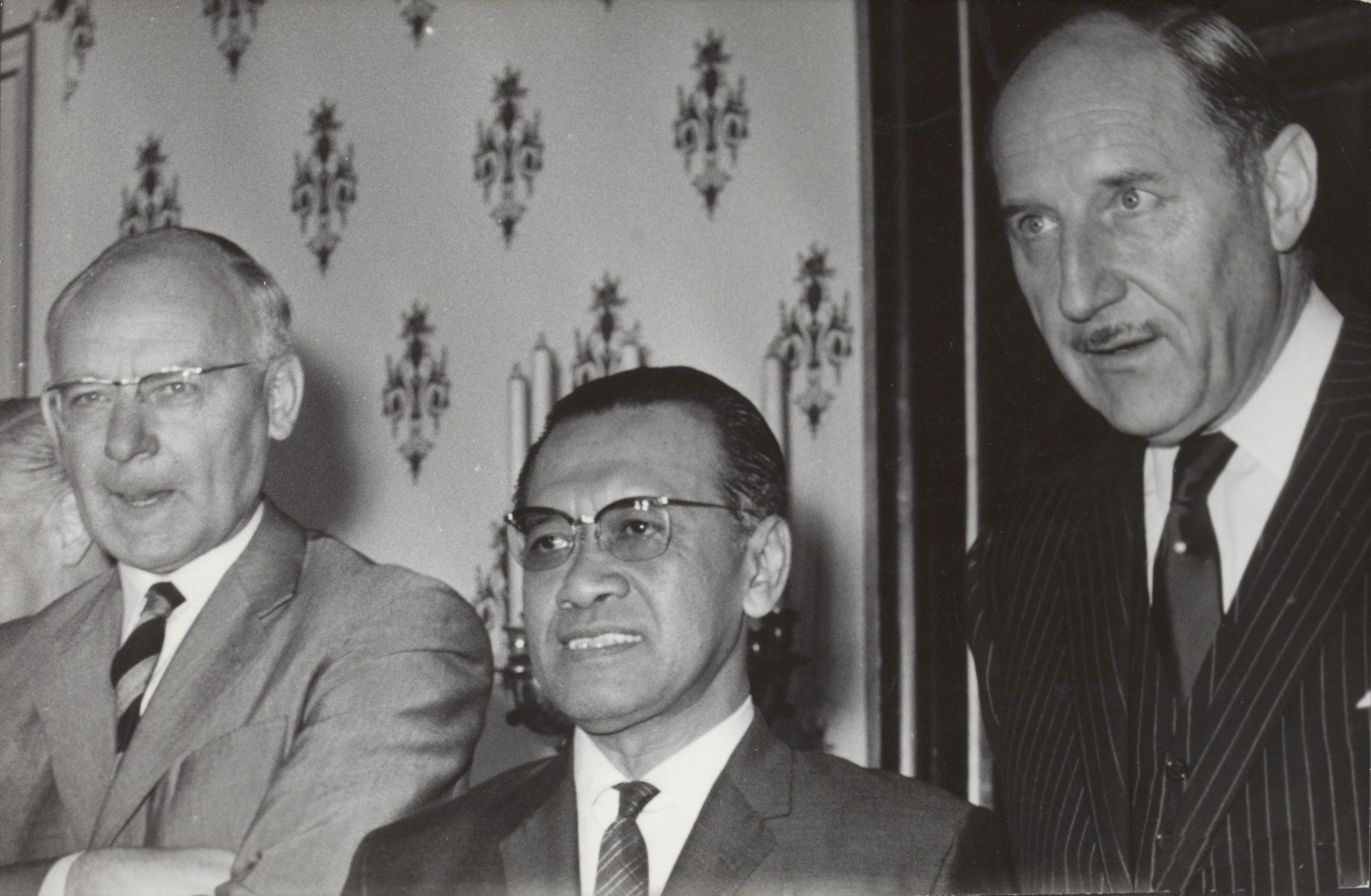
Deputy Prime Minister Anne Vondeling, Indonesian Minister for Economic Affairs Hamengkubuwono IX and Minister of Foreign Affairs Joseph Luns at the Indonesian Embassy in The Hague on 5 September 1966.

== Cabinet members ==
Ministers		Title/Ministry/Portfolio(s)			Term of office	Party
Jo Cals	Jo Cals (1914–1971)	Prime Minister	General Affairs		14 April 1965 – 22 November 1966	Catholic; People's Party
Anne Vondeling	Anne Vondeling (1916–1979)	Deputy; Prime Minister	Finance	14 April 1965 – 22 November 1966		Labour Party
Anne Vondeling	Anne Vondeling (1916–1979)	Minister	Finance	14 April 1965 – 22 November 1966		Labour Party
Barend Biesheuvel	Barend Biesheuvel (1920–2001)	Deputy; Prime Minister	Agriculture and Fisheries		24 July 1963 – 5 April 1967^{[Retained]} ^{[Continued]}	Anti-Revolutionary; Party
Barend Biesheuvel	Barend Biesheuvel (1920–2001)	Minister	Agriculture and Fisheries		24 July 1963 – 5 April 1967^{[Retained]} ^{[Continued]}	Anti-Revolutionary; Party
Barend Biesheuvel	Barend Biesheuvel (1920–2001)	Minister	Interior	• Suriname and Netherlands; Antilles Affairs	24 July 1963 – 5 April 1967^{[Retained]} ^{[Continued]}	Anti-Revolutionary; Party
Jan Smallenbroek	Jan Smallenbroek (1909–1974)	Minister	Interior		14 April 1965 – 31 August 1966^{[Res]}	Anti-Revolutionary; Party
Ivo Samkalden	Ivo Samkalden (1912–1995)	Minister	Interior		31 August 1966 – 5 September 1966^{[Ad Interim]}	Labour Party
Koos Verdam	Koos Verdam (1915–1998)	Minister	Interior		5 September 1966 – 5 April 1967^{[Continued]}	Anti-Revolutionary; Party
Joseph Luns	Joseph Luns (1911–2002)	Minister	Foreign Affairs		13 October 1956 – 6 July 1971^{[Retained]} ^{[Continued]}	Catholic; People's Party
Ivo Samkalden	Ivo Samkalden (1912–1995)	Minister	Justice		14 April 1965 – 22 November 1966	Labour Party
Joop den Uyl	Joop den Uyl (1919–1987)	Minister	Economic Affairs		14 April 1965 – 22 November 1966	Labour Party
Piet de Jong	Piet de Jong (1915–2016)	Minister	Defence		24 July 1963 – 5 April 1967^{[Retained]} ^{[Continued]}	Catholic; People's Party
Gerard Veldkamp	Gerard Veldkamp (1921–1990)	Minister	Social Affairs and Health		17 July 1961 – 5 April 1967^{[Retained]} ^{[Continued]}	Catholic; People's Party
Isaäc Arend Diepenhorst	Isaäc Arend; Diepenhorst (1916–2004)	Minister	Education and Sciences		14 April 1965 – 5 April 1967^{[Continued]}	Anti-Revolutionary; Party
Ko Suurhoff	Ko Suurhoff (1905–1967)	Minister	Transport and Water Management		14 April 1965 – 1 May 1966^{[Note]}	Labour Party
Pieter Bogaers	Pieter Bogaers (1924–2008)	Minister	Transport and Water Management		1 May 1966 – 30 June 1966^{[Acting]}	Catholic; People's Party
Ko Suurhoff	Ko Suurhoff (1905–1967)	Minister	Transport and Water Management		30 June 1966 – 22 November 1966	Labour Party
Pieter Bogaers	Pieter Bogaers (1924–2008)	Minister	Housing and Spatial Planning		24 July 1963 – 22 November 1966^{[Retained]}	Catholic; People's Party
Maarten Vrolijk	Maarten Vrolijk (1919–1994)	Minister	Culture, Recreation and Social Work		14 April 1965 – 22 November 1966	Labour Party
Minister without portfolio		Title/Ministry/Portfolio(s)			Term of office	Party
Theo Bot	Theo Bot (1911–1984)	Minister	Foreign Affairs	• Development; Cooperation	14 April 1965 – 5 April 1967^{[Continued]}	Catholic; People's Party
State Secretaries		Title/Ministry/Portfolio(s)			Term of office	Party
Theo Westerhout	Theo Westerhout (1922–1987)	State Secretary	Interior	• Municipalities • Provinces	12 July 1965 – 22 November 1966	Labour Party
Leo de Block	Leo de Block (1904–1988)	State Secretary	Foreign Affairs)	• European Union • Benelux	3 September 1963 – 5 April 1967^{[Retained]} ^{[Continued]}	Catholic; People's Party
Max van der Stoel	Max van der Stoel (1924–2011)	State Secretary	Foreign Affairs)	• United Nations • International; Organizations	22 July 1965 – 22 November 1966	Labour Party
Wiel Hoefnagels	Wiel Hoefnagels (1929–1978)	State Secretary	Finance	• Fiscal Policy • Tax and Customs • Governmental; Budget	31 May 1965 – 22 November 1966	Catholic; People's Party
Joop Bakker	Joop Bakker (1921–2003)	State Secretary	Economic Affairs	• Small and Medium-sized; Businesses • Regional; Development	3 September 1963 – 22 November 1966^{[Retained]}	Anti-Revolutionary; Party
Gerard Peijnenburg	Gerard; Peijnenburg (1919–2000)	State Secretary	Defence	• Army	13 May 1965 – 5 April 1967^{[Continued]}	Independent; Christian Democratic; Catholic
Adri van Es	Adri van Es (1913–1994)	State Secretary	Defence	• Navy	14 August 1963 – 16 September 1972^{[Retained]} ^{[Continued]}	Anti-Revolutionary; Party
Jan Borghouts	Jan Borghouts (1910–1966)	State Secretary	Defence	• Air Force	12 July 1965 – 5 February 1966^{[Died]}	Catholic; People's Party
Heije Schaper	Heije Schaper (1906–1996)	State Secretary	Defence	• Air Force	22 June 1966 – 5 April 1967^{[Continued]}	Independent; Conservative Liberal
Louis Bartels	Louis Bartels (1915–2002)	State Secretary	Social Affairs and Health)	• Primary; Healthcare • Elderly Care • Disability Policy • Medical Ethics	3 September 1963 – 5 April 1967^{[Retained]} ^{[Continued]}	Catholic; People's Party
José de Meijer	José de Meijer (1915–2000)	State Secretary	Social Affairs and Health)	• Occupational; Safety • Public; Organisations	15 November 1963 – 5 April 1967^{[Retained]} ^{[Continued]}	Catholic; People's Party
Hans Grosheide	Hans Grosheide (1930–2022)	State Secretary	Education and Sciences	• Primary; Education • Secondary; Education • Special; Education	3 September 1963 – 6 July 1971^{[Retained]} ^{[Continued]}	Anti-Revolutionary; Party
Siep Posthumus	Siep Posthumus (1910–1987)	State Secretary	Transport and Water Management	• Rail Transport • Weather; Forecasting	4 May 1965 – 22 November 1966	Labour Party
Cees Egas	Cees Egas (1913–2001)	State Secretary	Culture, Recreation and Social Work	• Social Services • Youth Care • Nature • Culture • Art • Recreation • Sport	10 May 1965 – 22 November 1966	Labour Party
Source: (in Dutch) Rijksoverheid.nl

^{Resigned}
^{Retained from the previous cabinet}
^{Continued in the next cabinet}
^{Acting}
^{Ad Interim}
^{Died in Office}
^{Medical leave of absence from 1 May 1966 until 30 June 1966}
