= Wytgaard =

- Village
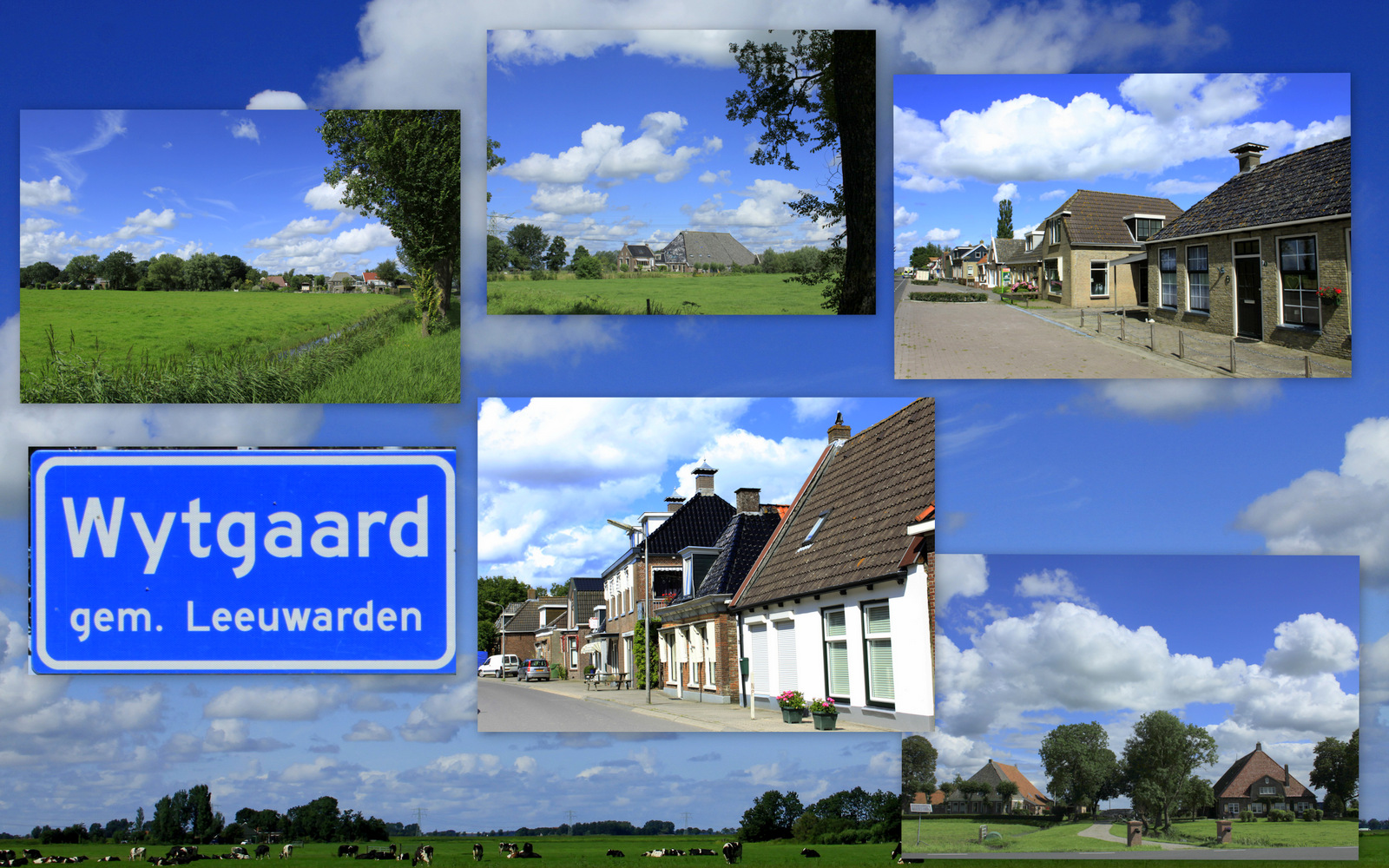

- Flag Coat of arms

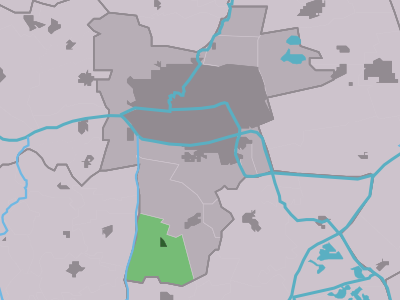
- Location in Leeuwarden municipality

- Location in the Netherlands Wytgaard (Netherlands)
- Coordinates: 53°8′27″N 5°47′2″E
- Country: Netherlands
- Province: Friesland
- Municipality: Leeuwarden

Population (2017)
  - Total: 570
- Time zone: UTC+1 (CET)
  - Summer (DST): UTC+2 (CEST)
- Postal code: 9089
- Telephone area: 058

Wytgaard (Dutch: Wijtgaard or Wytgaard) is a village in Leeuwarden municipality in the province of Friesland, the Netherlands. It had a population of around 570 in January 2017.

== History and name ==
Wytgaard started as a small hamlet in the 17th century in an area that was that until approximately the 13th century situated on the edge of the former Middelzee. The hamlet arose in a Roman Catholic enclave west of the Protestant village of Wirdum. The area was listed as "Wytghardera ny land" in 1485. Possibly this refers to a monastery that would have stood there, also explained as De Witte Gaarde.

The area in which the hamlet eventually developed was already slightly inhabited and in 1511 it was mentioned as Wijtgaerdt and in 1543 as Uuytgaerd. After the real hamlet had arisen it was mentioned as Wytgaard in 1718. And after that the spelling Wijtgaard was mostly used. The hamlet consisted of two core neighborhoods and they eventually fused together. Slowly it became a small village. Before the municipal reorganizations in 1944, it belonged to the municipality Leeuwarderadeel.

The village became independent in 1957 when it officially broke away from Wirdum, it was around the time that the spelling Wytgaard was also in use again. Although it's really not know if the spelling was changed in 1957 when it became a village but the town sign chanced it to Wytgaard and in some of the official record Wytgaard was used. In documents the municipal officials mostly use(d) the spelling Wijtgaard. Both spellings are used after since in Dutch. In West Frisian the spelling was Wytgaerd, up until 1982 when the Fryske Akadamy changed it to Wytgaard as the preferred spelling in West Frisian. It's still unclear what the real official name is since it became a village of its own. But postal code named is officially Wytgaard. Wytgaard is more often used in Dutch but the spelling Wijtgaard is also still used, especially on maps.
