= Society for the Advancement of Science, Medicine and Surgery =

The Society for the Advancement of Science, Medicine and Surgery (Dutch: Het Genootschap ter bevordering van Natuur- Genees- en Heelkunde) was founded in 1790 in Amsterdam as the society for the Advancement of Surgery. The founder was Andreas Bonn, professor of anatomy and surgery at the Athenaeum Illustre, which is the predecessor of the University of Amsterdam. The Society then aimed at improving the quality of surgeons in Amsterdam. In the next century, the Society realized that to reach this goal it was necessary to connect to physicians, and later also to scientists. Thus, in 1870 the Society changed into its present form.

Membership of the Society is open to persons that hold a doctorate of the University of Amsterdam in Medicine or Science and to the faculty of the Medicine and Science faculty of the University of Amsterdam.

Activities of the society include

- Organizing scientific meetings
- Maintaining professorships by special appointment at the University of Amsterdam
- Supporting students with travel grants
- Honoring outstanding scientists by awarding medals
