= 1963 Dutch cabinet formation =

Government formation process in the Netherlands following the 1963 general election

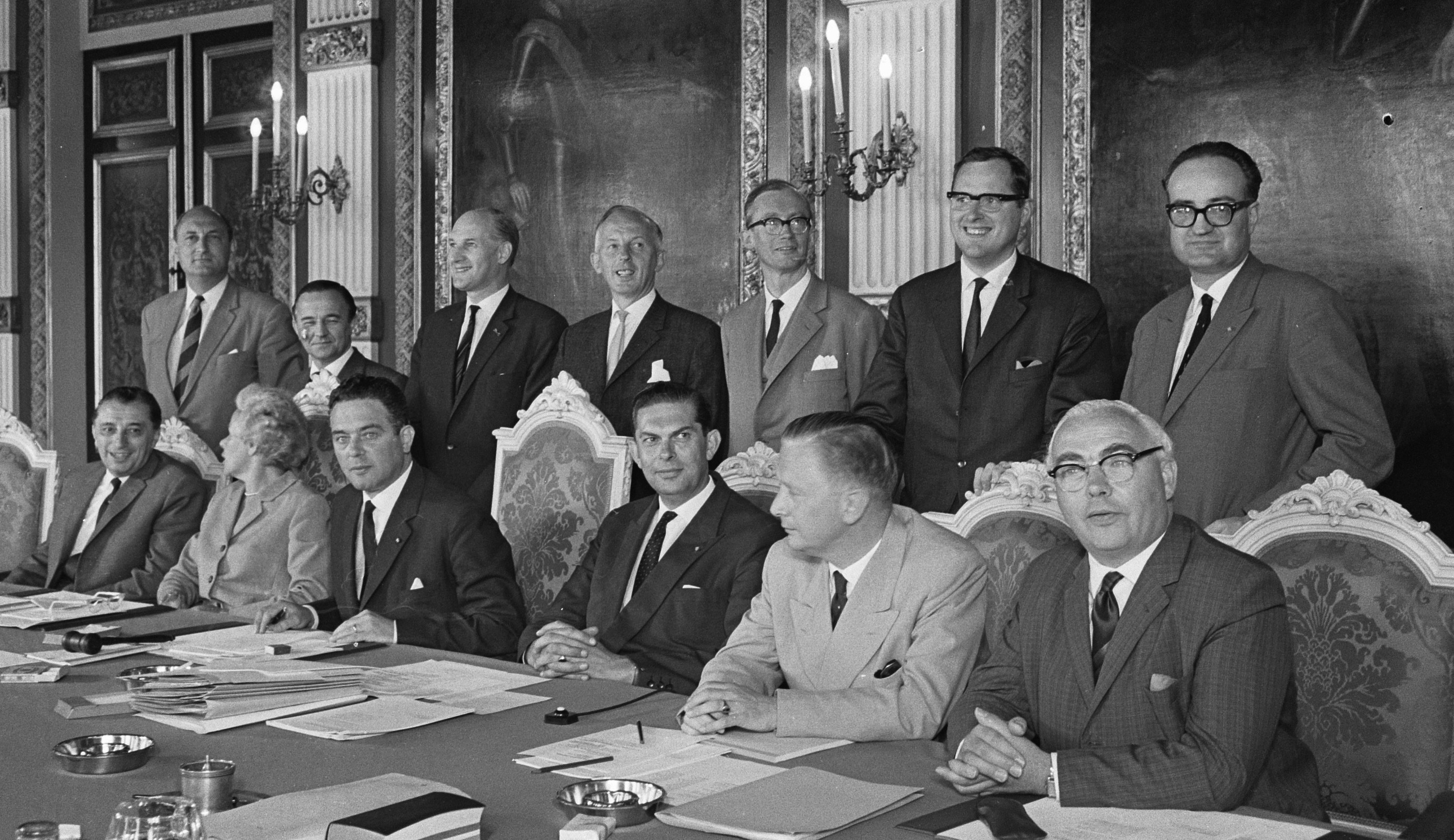
- The ministers of the Marijnen cabinet
- Date: 15 May – 19 July 1963
- Location: Netherlands
- Outcome: Formation of the Marijnen cabinet

The 1963 Dutch cabinet formation followed the general election of 15 May 1963 and resulted, after 65 days of negotiations, in the formation of the Marijnen cabinet.

== Background ==
The election took place at the end of the regular term of the De Quay cabinet. Major developments in the election included the entry of the Farmers' Party into the House of Representatives with three seats, the decline of the Labour Party (PvdA) from 48 to 43 seats, and the strong performance of the Catholic People's Party (KVP), which won one-third of all seats.

The incumbent coalition of the KVP, VVD, ARP, and Christian Historical Union (CHU) lost a combined total of two seats, though it retained a comfortable parliamentary majority. The Reformed Political League (GPV) entered parliament for the first time with one seat, while the Pacifist Socialist Party (PSP) gained two seats and the Communist Party of the Netherlands (CPN) gained one.

== Informateur Romme ==
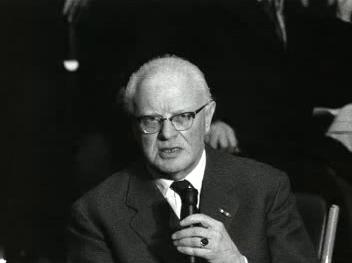
Carl Romme

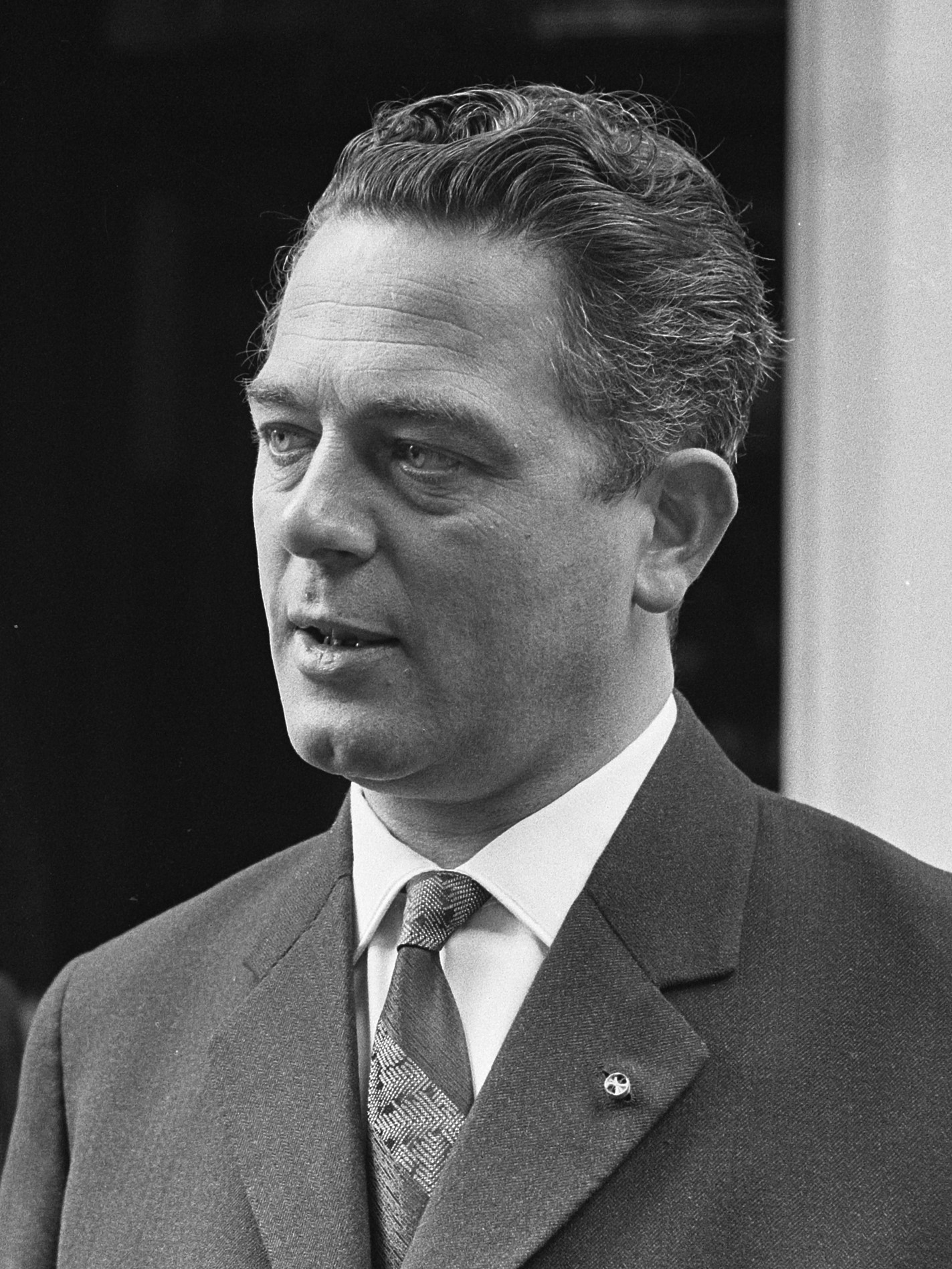
Victor Marijnen

With 50 seats, the KVP was by far the largest party in parliament. Since the PvdA and VVD ruled out cooperation with one another, the KVP effectively held the balance between forming a centre-left or centre-right coalition. Some within the KVP favored cooperation with the PvdA, while others preferred continuation of the centre-right policies of the De Quay cabinet.

Queen Juliana appointed Carl Romme, a member of the Council of State and former KVP parliamentary leader, as informateur. Romme began by drafting a set of policy proposals known as "building blocks" (bouwstenen), intended to serve as the basis for coalition negotiations.

Before the election, outgoing Prime Minister Jan de Quay had already sounded out Victor Marijnen, Minister of Agriculture and fellow KVP member, as a potential prime ministerial candidate. Romme and Louis Beel, vice-president of the Council of State, also supported Marijnen. On 20 May, Beel communicated his preference to the Queen. Romme proposed Marijnen as formateur, but Marijnen was reluctant to bypass KVP parliamentary leader Wim de Kort, who wished to become formateur himself.

== Formateur De Kort ==
After Romme completed 38 policy "building blocks", De Kort was appointed formateur. Queen Juliana made clear, at the urging of De Quay, that De Kort should not expect to become prime minister himself.

De Kort’s task was to determine which parties would form the new government. The PvdA had shown willingness during the information phase to compromise on several policy issues. Nevertheless, De Kort opted to continue negotiations with the VVD, without providing extensive justification. The ARP and CHU, both coalition partners in the outgoing cabinet, soon joined the talks.

Once selected for coalition participation, the VVD introduced substantial amendments to Romme’s policy proposals, which the KVP regarded as the core framework of government policy. De Kort failed to reconcile the disagreements between the parties and ultimately returned his assignment to the Queen.

== Informateur Beel ==
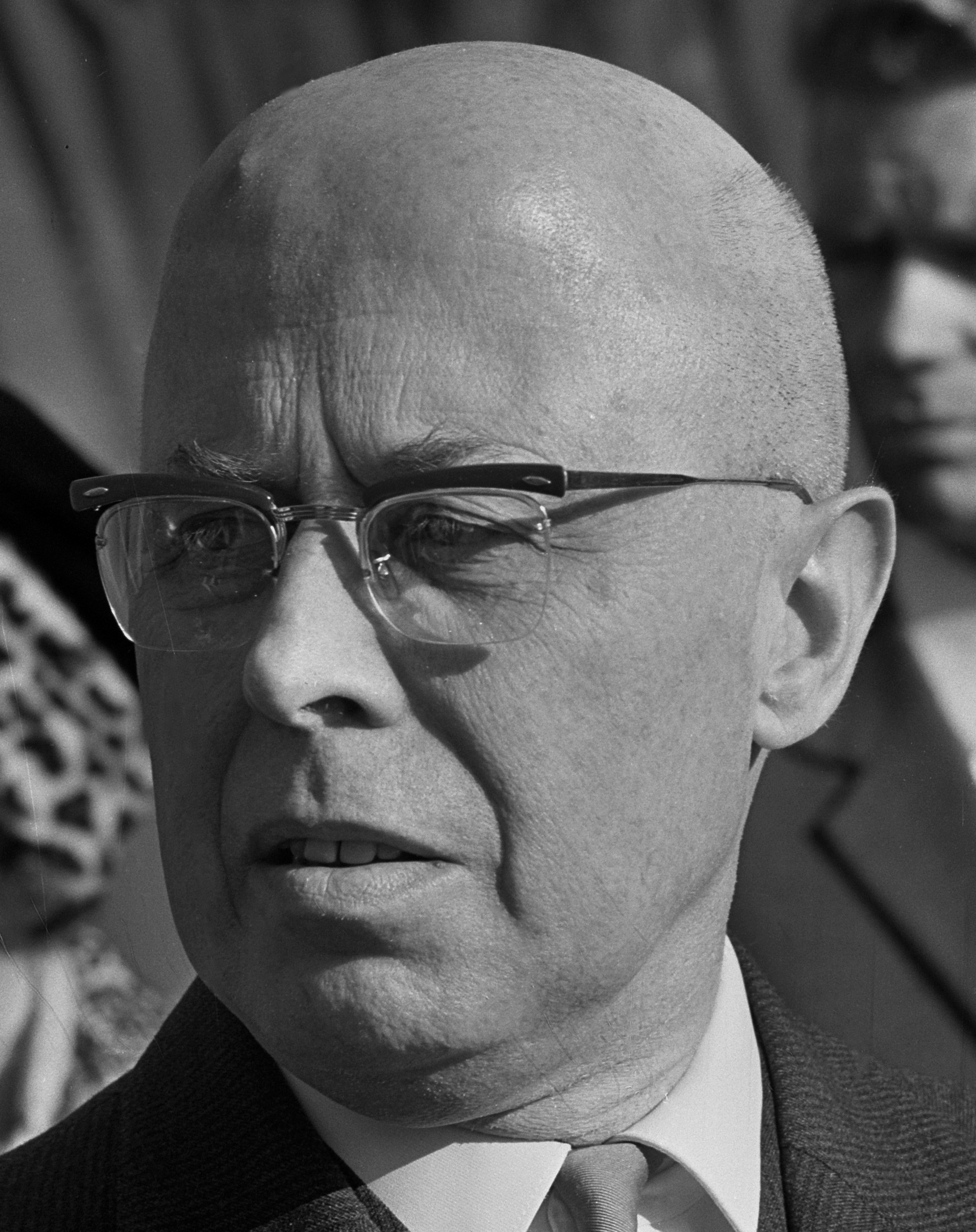
Louis Beel

Queen Juliana subsequently appointed Louis Beel as informateur. Within a week, Beel succeeded in reaching a coalition agreement.

On 4 July 1963, Beel invited the parliamentary leaders of the KVP, ARP, CHU, and VVD to his residence in Wassenaar. Away from press attention, the politicians entered the house discreetly through a wooded area behind the property. During ten hours of negotiations, the six remaining controversial issues were resolved.

The resulting agreement became known in Dutch political history as the Wassenaar Agreement. The policies of the De Quay cabinet formed the basis of the agreement, although tax reductions and the expansion of social security were included as important objectives.

The issue of broadcasting policy, particularly the question of whether commercial television broadcasters should be permitted, remained unresolved. The coalition parties agreed to transfer the issue to a so-called pacification committee, whose recommendations would not be binding. In practice, the arrangement postponed the issue until after the next election.

== Formateur De Quay ==
Queen Juliana then appointed Jan de Quay as formateur. Since De Quay did not wish to continue as prime minister, he approached ARP leader Jelle Zijlstra about taking the office. However, the KVP considered it unacceptable for a Protestant politician to lead the cabinet.

Wim de Kort then proposed Victor Marijnen as prime minister. The KVP parliamentary group indicated that it strongly preferred a prime minister from its own ranks who would also be acceptable to the coalition partners. The choice of candidate was left to the formateur, effectively clearing the way for Marijnen.

Marijnen was subsequently appointed formateur by the Queen and completed the cabinet formation within a week.

The resulting Marijnen cabinet would soon face controversy surrounding the marriage of Princess Irene to the Spanish pretender Carlos Hugo, Duke of Parma. The cabinet eventually fell following the broadcasting crisis.

== Sources ==
- Maas, Petrus Franciscus (1982). Kabinetsformaties 1959–1973 (PDF) (in Dutch). Staatsuitgeverij. ISBN 9789012039987.
- Giebels, Lambert J. (1995). Beel. Van vazal tot onderkoning. Biografie 1902–1977 (in Dutch).
- Kabinetsformatie 1963 at Parlement.com
