= Marijnen cabinet =

Cabinet of the Netherlands, 1963 to 1965

- Cabinet of the Netherlands

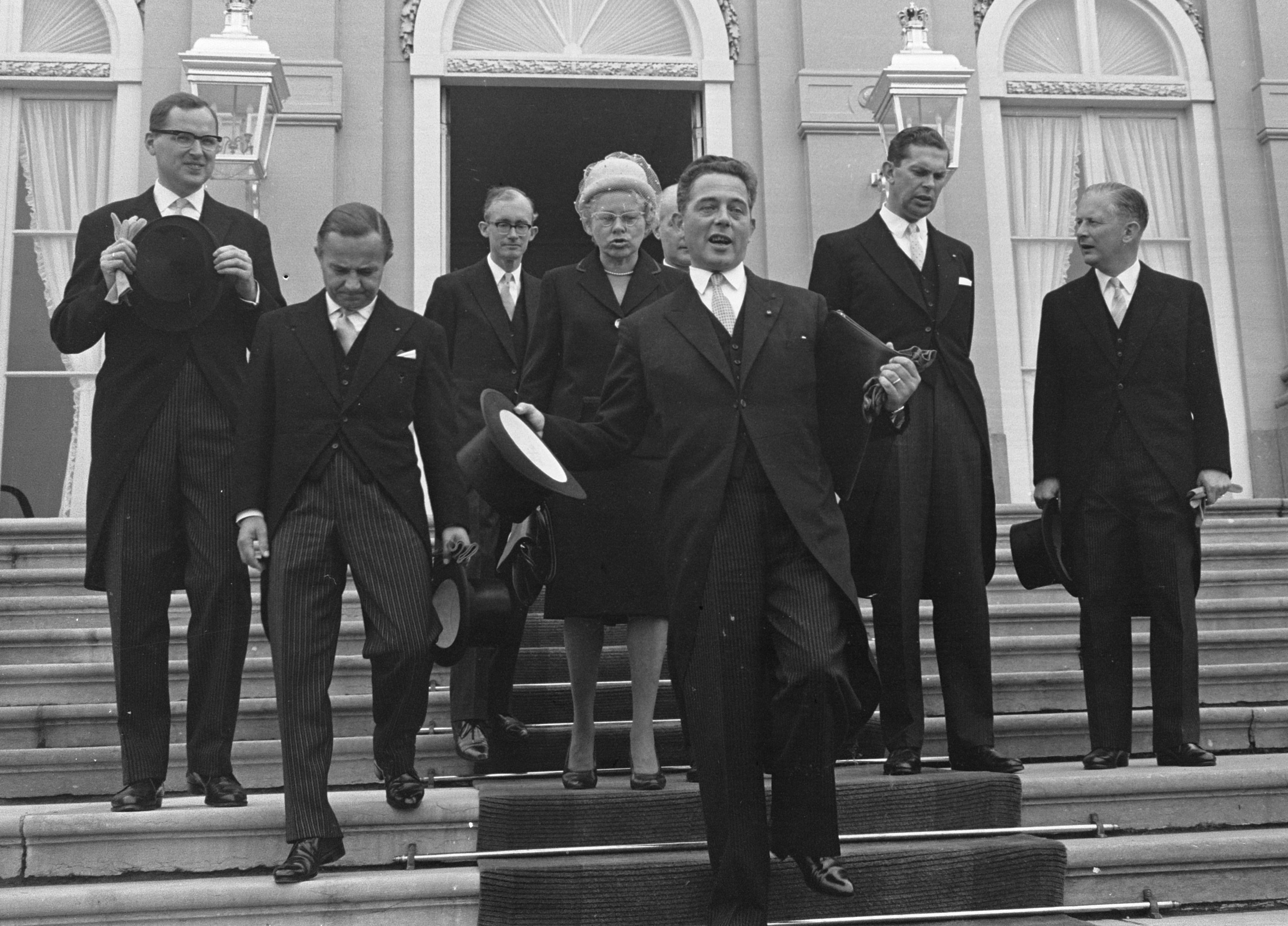
- The installation of the Marijnen cabinet on 24 July 1963
- Date formed: 24 July 1963
- Date dissolved: 14 April 1965; 1 year, 264 days in office (Demissionary from 27 February 1965)

People and organisations
- Monarch: Queen Juliana
- Prime Minister: Victor Marijnen
- Deputy Prime Minister: Barend Biesheuvel
- No. of ministers: 14
- Member party: Catholic People's Party (KVP); People's Party for Freedom and Democracy (VVD); Anti-Revolutionary Party (ARP); Christian Historical Union (CHU)
- Status in legislature: Centre-right; Majority government

History
- Incoming formation: 1963 formation
- Outgoing formation: 1965 formation
- Election: 1963 election
- Legislature terms: 1963–1967
- Predecessor: De Quay cabinet
- Successor: Cals cabinet

The Marijnen cabinet was the cabinet of the Netherlands from 24 July 1963 until 14 April 1965. The cabinet was a continuation of the previous De Quay cabinet and was formed by the Christian democratic Catholic People's Party (KVP), Anti-Revolutionary Party (ARP) and Christian Historical Union (CHU) and the conservative liberal People's Party for Freedom and Democracy (VVD) after the election of 1963. The cabinet was a centre-right coalition and had a substantial majority in the House of Representatives with prominent Catholic politician Victor Marijnen the Minister of Agriculture and Fisheries in the previous cabinet serving as Prime Minister. Protestant Leader Barend Biesheuvel served as Deputy Prime Minister, Minister of Agriculture and Fisheries and was given the portfolio of Suriname and Netherlands Antilles Affairs.

The cabinet served in the middle of the tumultuous 1960s, domestically it had to deal with the counterculture and economic changes following the discovery of the Groningen gas field and it had to deal with the fallout of the marriage between Princess Irene and Carlist Carlos Hugo of Bourbon-Parma and it was able to implement several major social reforms to health insurance and the public broadcasting system, internationally the disbandment of the Netherlands New Guinea was finalized. The cabinet suffered several major internal conflicts, and fell just 19 months into its term on 27 February 1965 following a conflict over the implantation of Commercial Broadcasting and continued in a demissionary capacity until it was replaced with the Cals cabinet.

== Term ==
The natural gas reserves, recently found in Slochteren were a considerable boost for the economy. This, combined with labour shortage led to a rise in wages and the attraction of foreign workers. Despite this being the second cabinet without socialist Labour Party, the building up of a welfare state, that was started after World War II, continued with the introduction of minimum wages in 1964 and the national health service.

In 1965, measures were taken against commercial television stations transmitting from the North Sea. The cabinet finally fell over the issue if commercial TV should be allowed in the Netherlands.

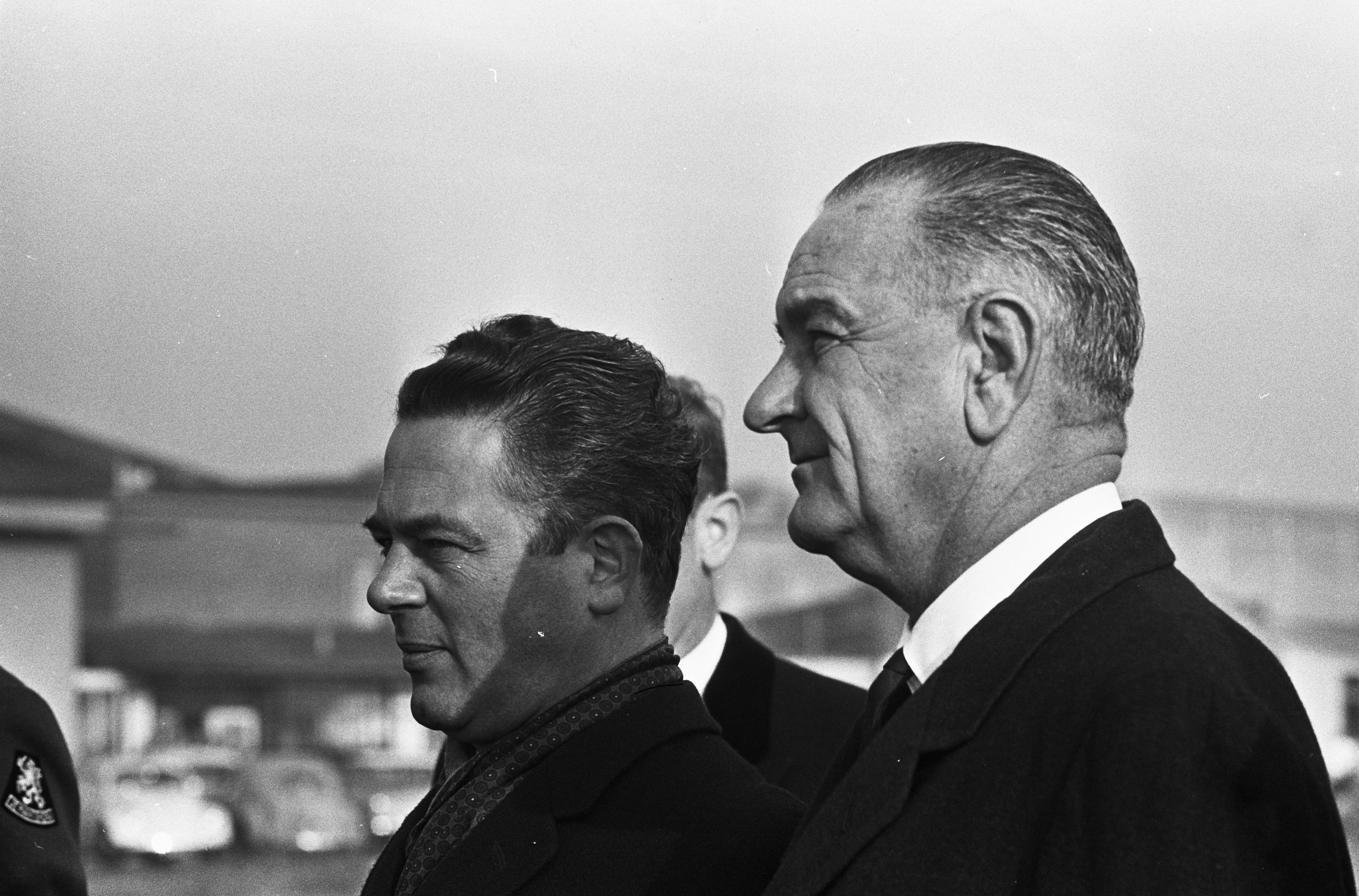
Prime Minister Victor Marijnen and Vice President of the United States Lyndon B. Johnson at Ypenburg Airport on 5 November 1963.

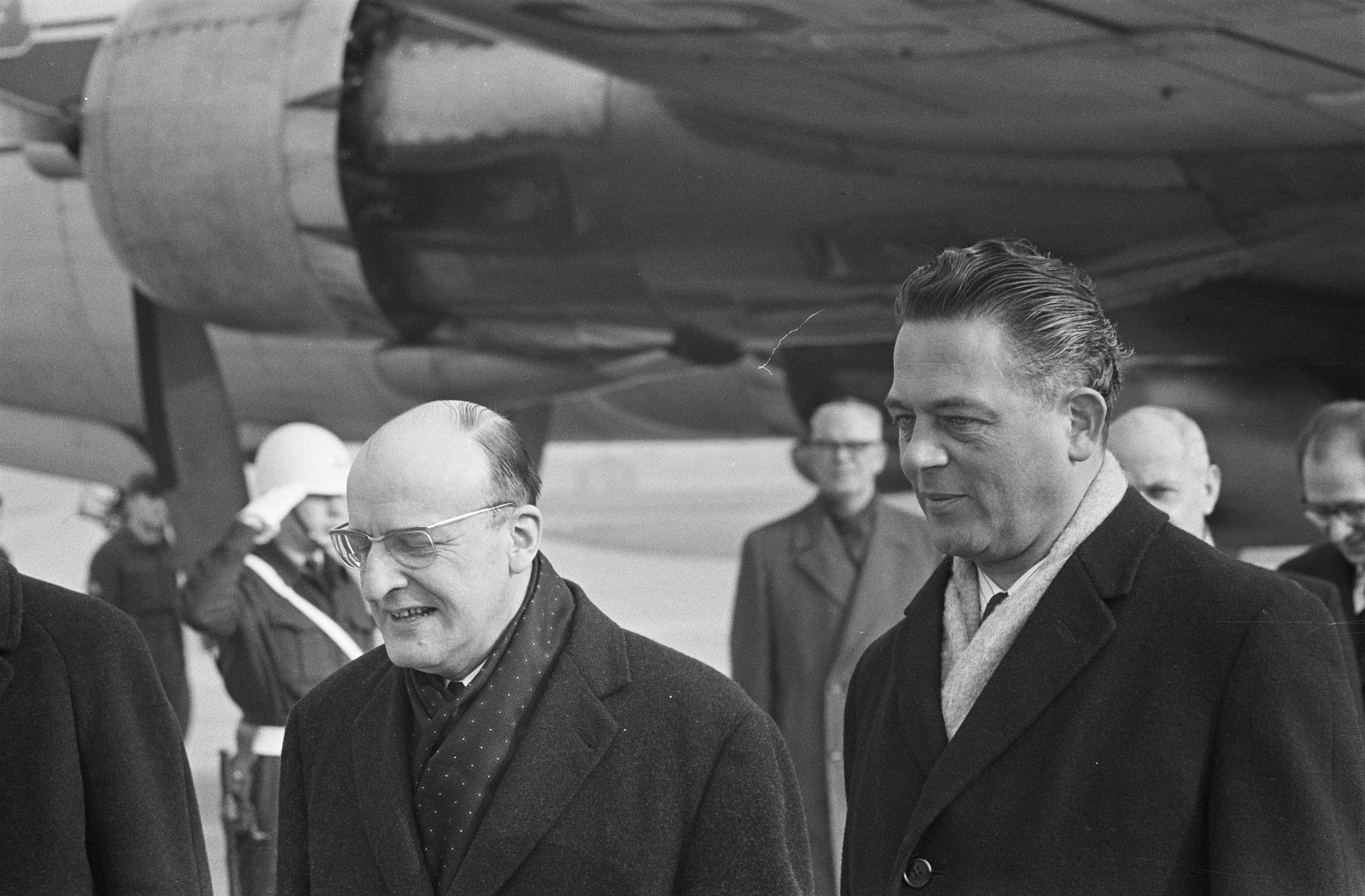
Prime Minister of Belgium Théo Lefèvre and Prime Minister Victor Marijnen at Ypenburg Airport on 15 February 1964.

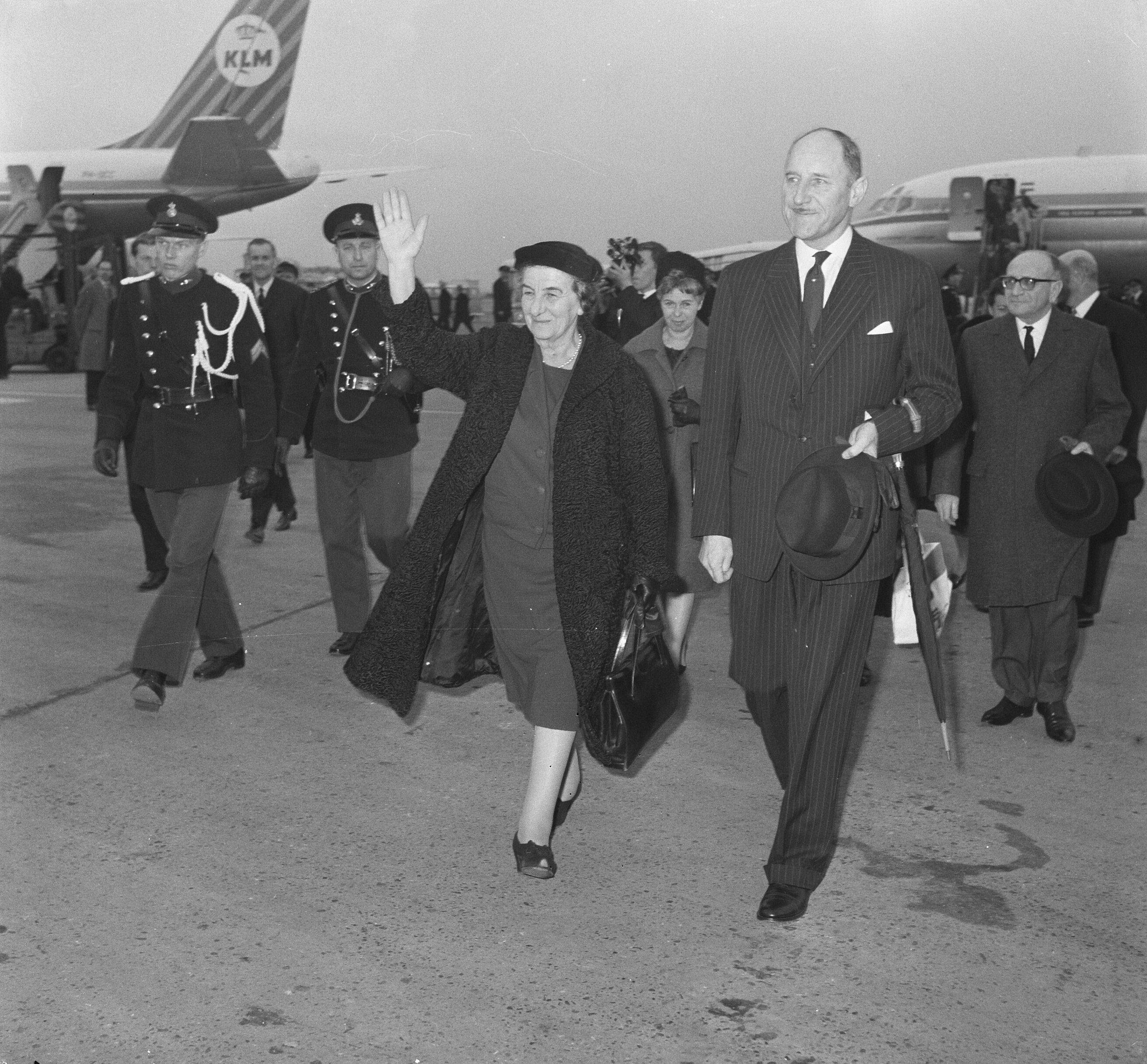
Israeli Minister of Foreign Affairs Golda Meir and Minister Joseph Luns at Airport Schiphol on 25 February 1964.

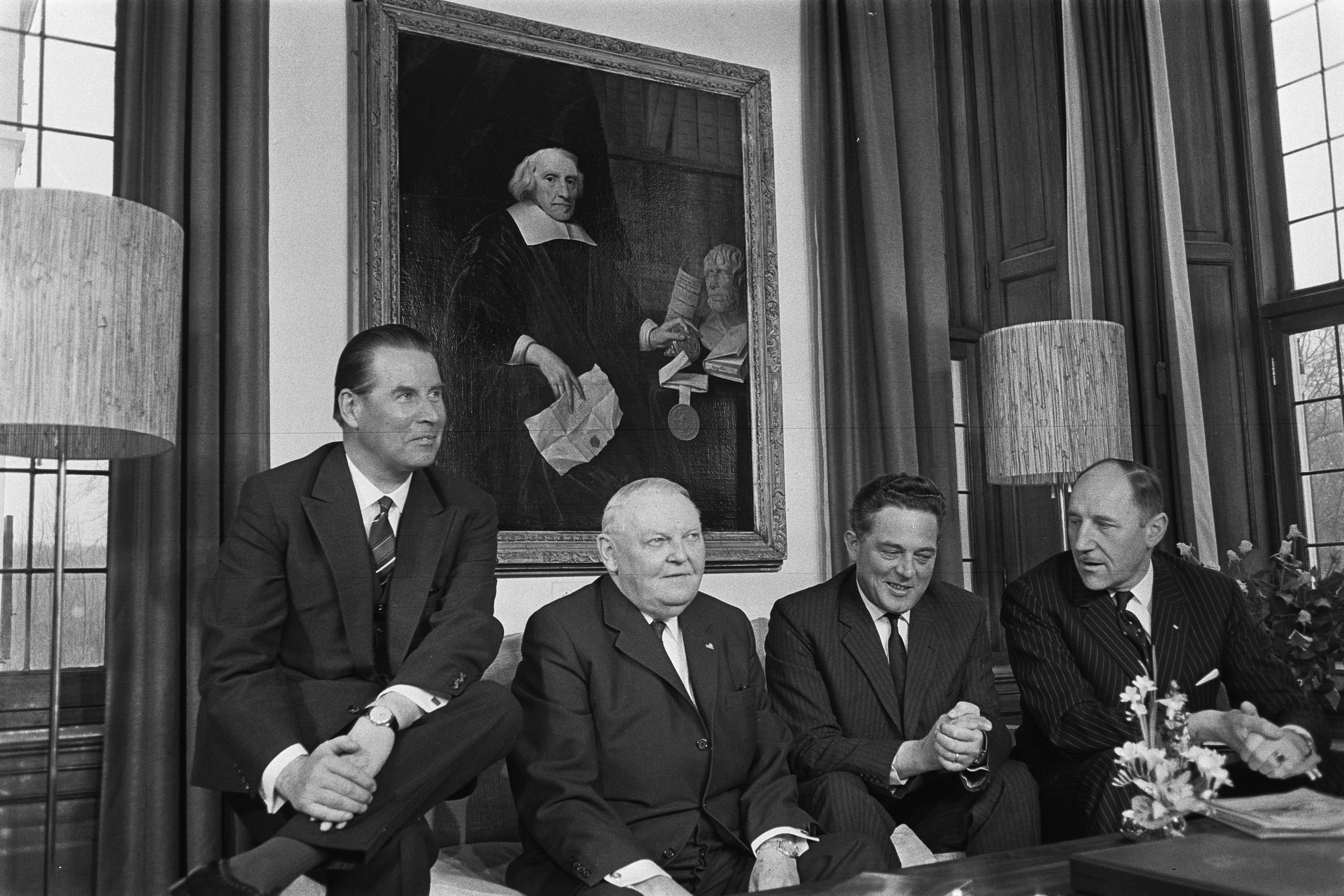
West-German Minister for Foreign Affairs Gerhard Schröder, Chancellor of West-Germany Ludwig Erhard, Prime Minister Victor Marijnen and Minister Joseph Luns at the Catshuis on 2 March 1964.

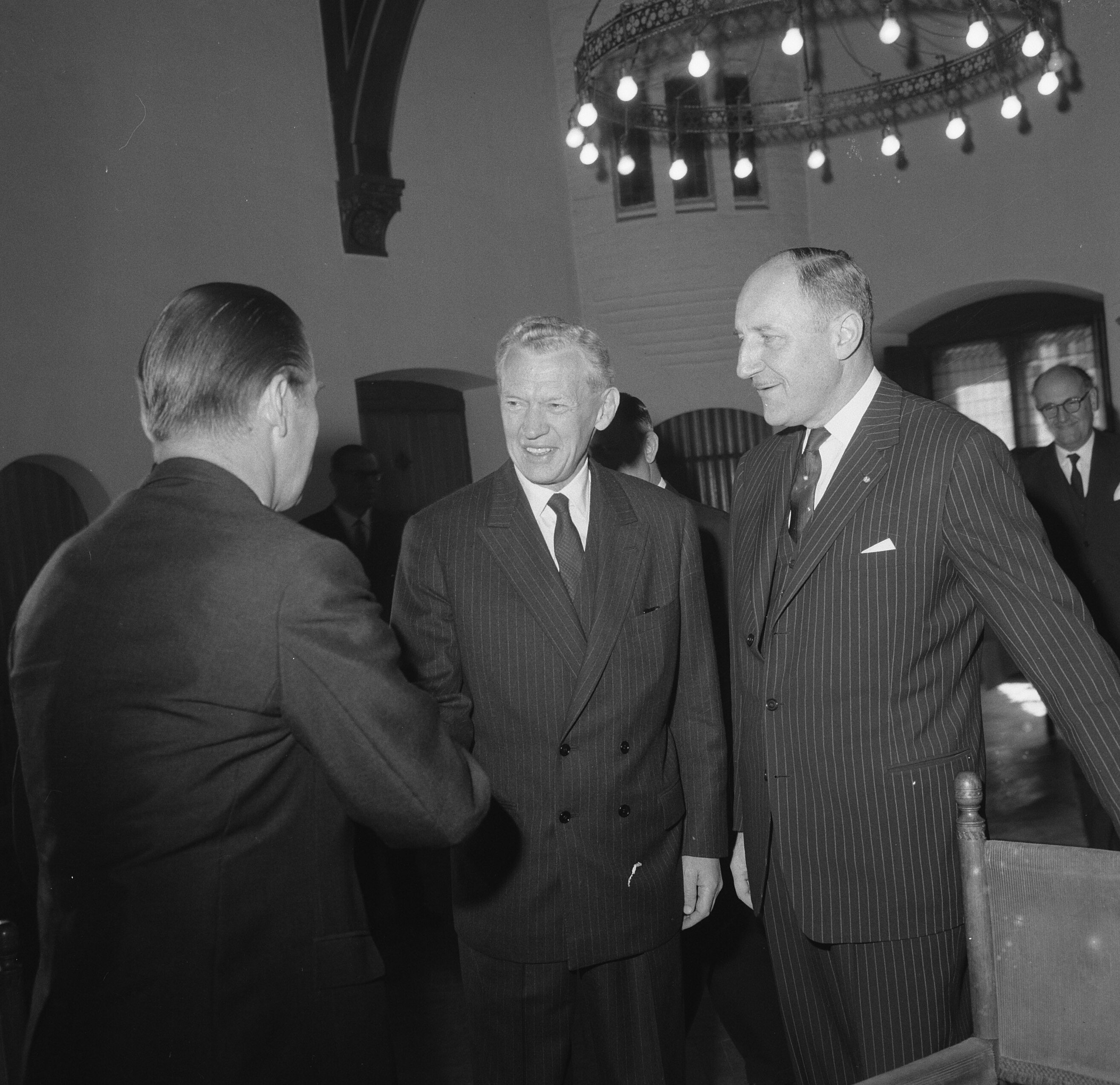
French Minister of Foreign Affairs Maurice Couve de Murville and Minister Joseph Luns at a NATO conference in The Hague on 12 May 1964.

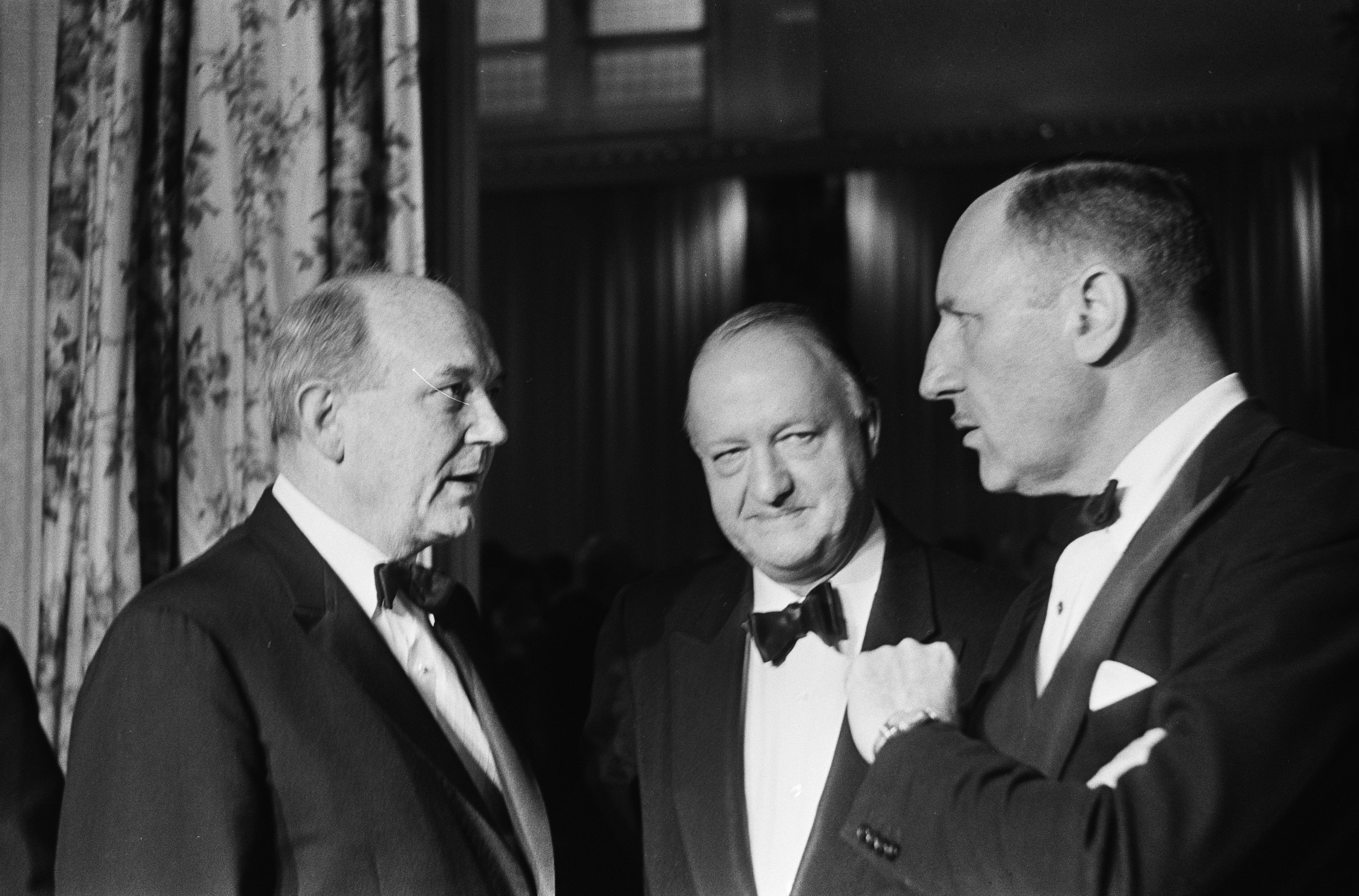
United States Secretary of State Dean Rusk, British Secretary of State for Foreign Affairs Rab Butler and Minister Joseph Luns at a NATO conference in The Hague on 13 May 1964.

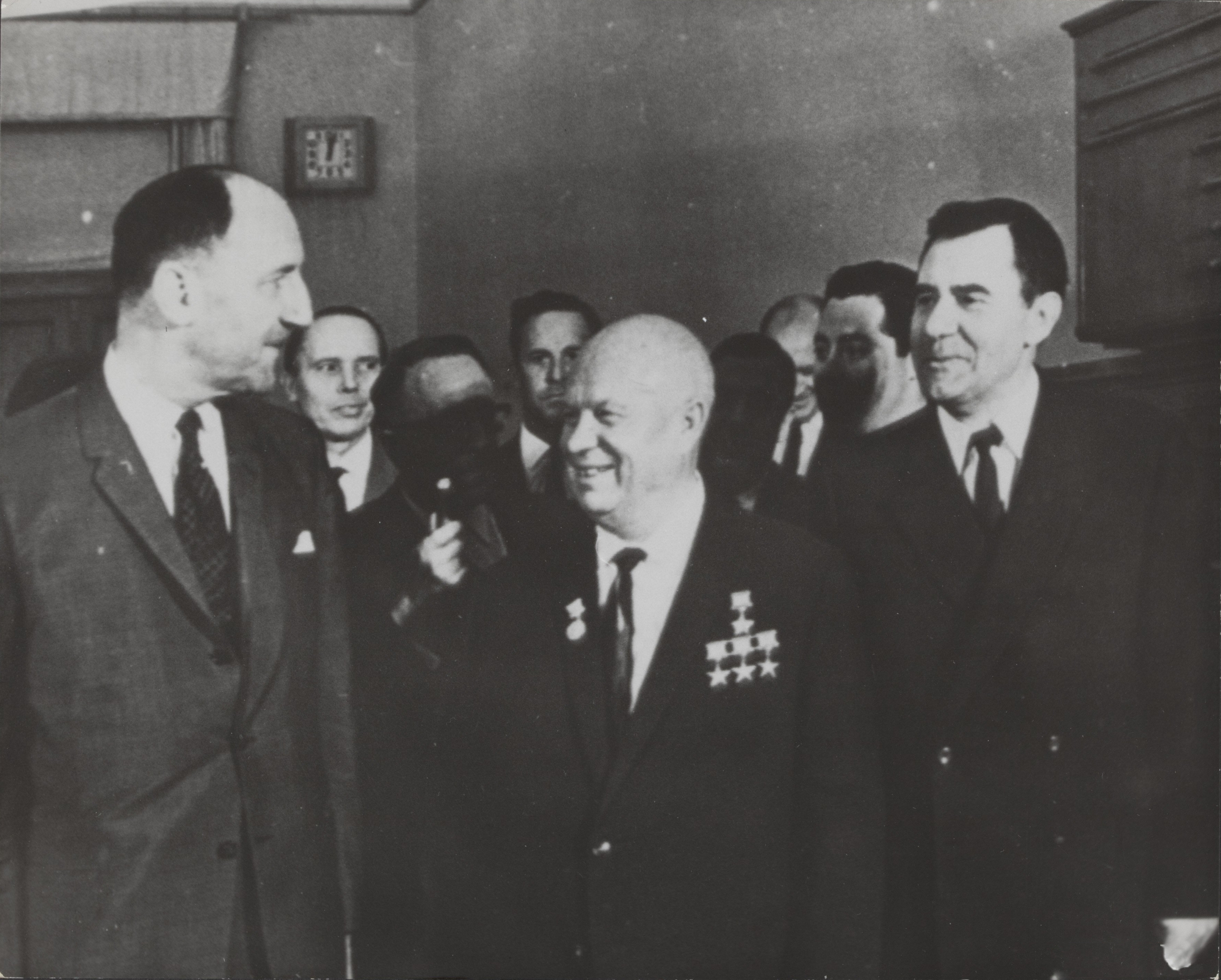
Minister Joseph Luns, Soviet Leader Nikita Khrushchev and Soviet Minister of Foreign Affairs Andrei Gromyko at the Kremlin Senate on 8 July 1964.

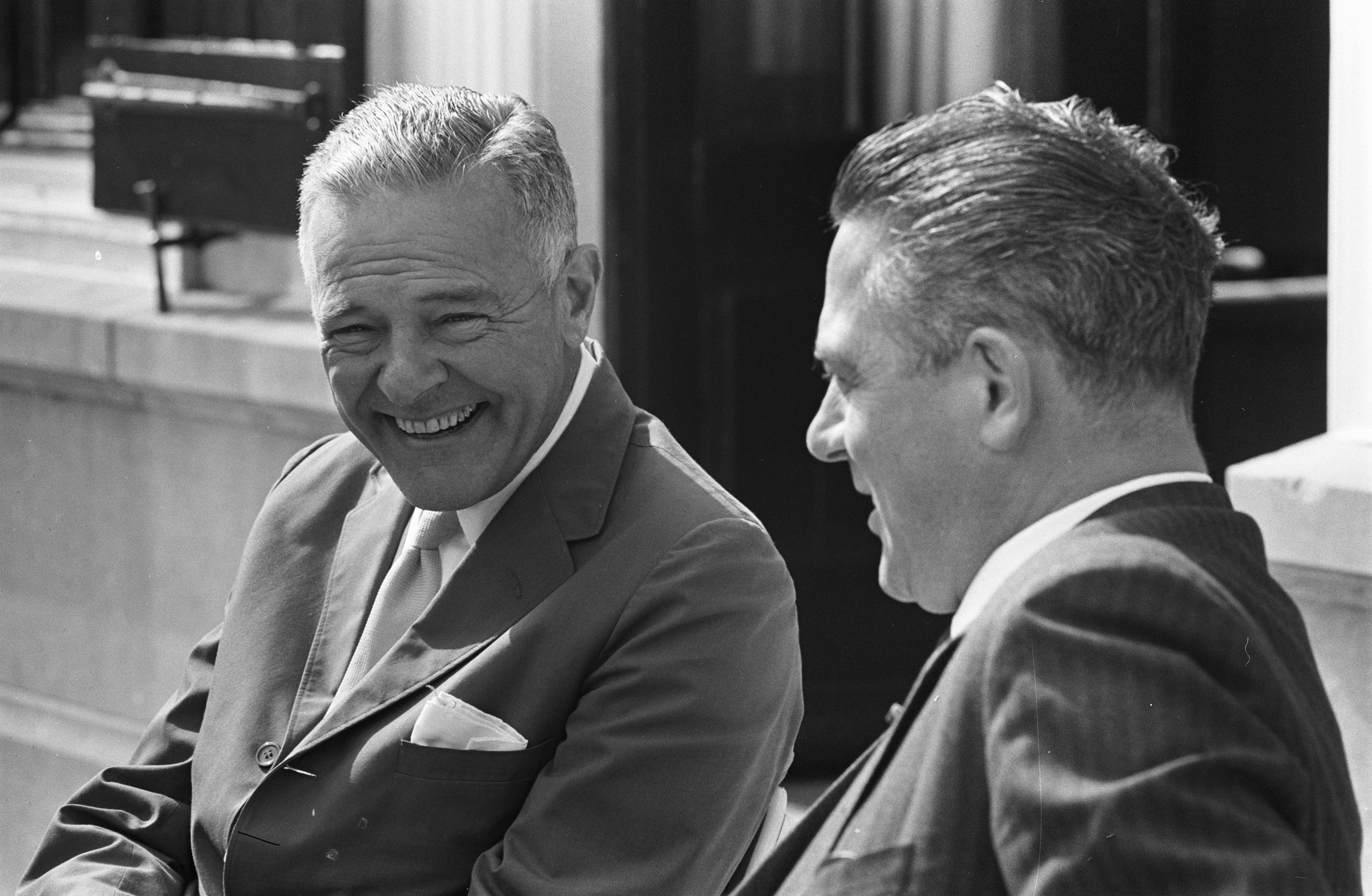
American Ambassador at Large Henry Cabot Lodge Jr. and Prime Minister Victor Marijnen at the Catshuis on 20 August 1964.

== Cabinet members ==
Ministers		Position	Term of office	Party
Victor Marijnen	Victor Marijnen (1917–1975)	Prime Minister; Minister of General Affairs	24 July 1963 – 14 April 1965	Catholic; People's Party
Barend Biesheuvel	Barend Biesheuvel (1920–2001)	Deputy Prime Minister; Minister of Agriculture and Fisheries; Minister for Suriname and Netherlands Antilles Affairs	24 July 1963 – 5 April 1967^{[Continued]}	Anti-Revolutionary; Party
Edzo Toxopeus	Edzo Toxopeus (1918–2009)	Minister of the Interior	19 May 1959 – 14 April 1965^{[Retained]}	People's Party for Freedom and Democracy
Joseph Luns	Joseph Luns (1911–2002)	Minister of Foreign Affairs	13 October 1956 – 6 July 1971^{[Retained]} ^{[Continued]}	Catholic; People's Party
Johan Witteveen	Johan Witteveen (1921–2019)	Minister of Finance	24 July 1963 – 14 April 1965	People's Party for Freedom and Democracy
Ynso Scholten	Ynso Scholten (1918–1984)	Minister of Justice	24 July 1963 – 14 April 1965	Christian; Historical Union
Koos Andriessen	Koos Andriessen (1928–2019)	Minister of Economic Affairs	24 July 1963 – 14 April 1965	Christian; Historical Union
Piet de Jong	Piet de Jong (1915–2016)	Minister of Defence	24 July 1963 – 5 April 1967^{[Continued]}	Catholic; People's Party
Gerard Veldkamp	Gerard Veldkamp (1921–1990)	Minister of Social Affairs and Health	17 July 1961 – 5 April 1967^{[Retained]} ^{[Continued]}	Catholic; People's Party
Theo Bot	Theo Bot (1911–1984)	Minister of Education, Arts and Sciences	24 July 1963 – 14 April 1965	Catholic; People's Party
Jan van Aartsen	Jan van Aartsen (1909–1992)	Minister of Transport and Water Management	24 July 1963 – 14 April 1965	Anti-Revolutionary; Party
Pieter Bogaers	Pieter Bogaers (1924–2008)	Minister of Housing and Construction	24 July 1963 – 14 April 1965	Catholic; People's Party
Jo Schouwenaar-Franssen	Jo Schouwenaar- Franssen (1909–1995)	Minister of Social Work	24 July 1963 – 14 April 1965	People's Party for Freedom and Democracy
State Secretaries		Position	Term of office	Party
Leo de Block	Leo de Block (1904–1988)	State Secretary of Foreign Affairs • European Union • Benelux	3 September 1963 – 5 April 1967^{[Continued]}	Catholic; People's Party
Isaäc Nicolaas Diepenhorst	Isaäc Nicolaas; Diepenhorst (1907–1976)	State Secretary of Foreign Affairs • Development Cooperation • United Nations • International Organizations	28 September 1963 – 14 April 1965	Christian; Historical Union
Wim van den Berge	Wim van den Berge (1905–1987)	State Secretary of Finance • Fiscal Policy • Tax and Customs • Government Budget	27 May 1959 – 14 April 1965^{[Retained]}	Independent
Joop Bakker	Joop Bakker (1921–2003)	State Secretary of Economic Affairs • Small and Medium-sized Businesses • Regional Development	3 September 1963 – 22 November 1966^{[Continued]}	Anti-Revolutionary; Party
Joop Haex	Joop Haex (1911–2002)	State Secretary of Defence • Army	14 August 1963 – 14 April 1965	Christian; Historical Union
Adri van Es	Adri van Es (1913–1994)	State Secretary of Defence • Navy	14 August 1963 – 16 September 1972^{[Continued]}	Anti-Revolutionary; Party
Willem den Toom	Willem den Toom (1911–1998)	State Secretary of Defence • Air Force	25 November 1963 – 14 April 1965	Catholic; People's Party
Louis Bartels	Louis Bartels (1915–2002)	State Secretary of Social Affairs and Health • Primary Healthcare • Elderly Care • Disability Policy • Medical Ethics	3 September 1963 – 5 April 1967^{[Continued]}	Catholic; People's Party
José de Meijer	José de Meijer (1915–2000)	State Secretary of Social Affairs and Health • Occupational Safety • Public Organisations	15 November 1963 – 5 April 1967^{[Continued]}	Catholic; People's Party
Hans Grosheide	Hans Grosheide (1930–2022)	State Secretary of Education and Sciences • Primary Education • Secondary Education • Special Education	3 September 1963 – 6 July 1971^{[Continued]}	Anti-Revolutionary; Party
Louis van de Laar	Louis van de Laar (1921–2004)	State Secretary of Education and Sciences • Social Services • Youth Care • Media • Culture • Art • Recreation • Sport	24 October 1963 – 14 April 1965	Catholic; People's Party
Mike Keyzer	Mike Keyzer (1911–1983)	State Secretary of Transport and Water Management • Public; Transport • Aviation • Rail Transport • Weather; Forecasting	22 October 1963 – 14 April 1965	People's Party for Freedom and Democracy

^{Retained from the previous cabinet}
^{Continued in the next cabinet}

== Trivia ==
- The age difference between oldest cabinet member Leo de Block (born 1904) and the youngest cabinet member Hans Grosheide (born 1930) was 25 years, 357 days.
- Five cabinet members had previous experience as scholars and professors: Johan Witteveen (Financial Economics), Koos Andriessen (Political Economics), Gerard Veldkamp (Microeconomics), Willem Hendrik van den Berge (Public Economics) and Louis Bartels (Health Economics).
- The three cabinet State Secretaries for Defence where all flag officers: Joop Haex (Major General in the Army), Adri van Es (Rear Admiral in the Navy) and Willem den Toom (Major General in the Air Force).
- Ten cabinet member would later serve in the De Jong cabinet: Joseph Luns (Foreign Affairs), Johan Witteveen (Finance), Piet de Jong (Prime Minister), Leo de Block (Economic Affairs), Joop Bakker (Deputy Prime Minister), Joop Haex (Army), Adri van Es (Navy), Willem den Toom (Defence), Hans Grosheide (Education) and Mike Keyzer (Transport and Water Management).
- Koos Andriessen again served as Minister of Economic Affairs 24 years, 207 days later in the Third Lubbers cabinet.
