= De Jong cabinet =

Dutch cabinet, 1967 to 1971

- Cabinet of the Netherlands

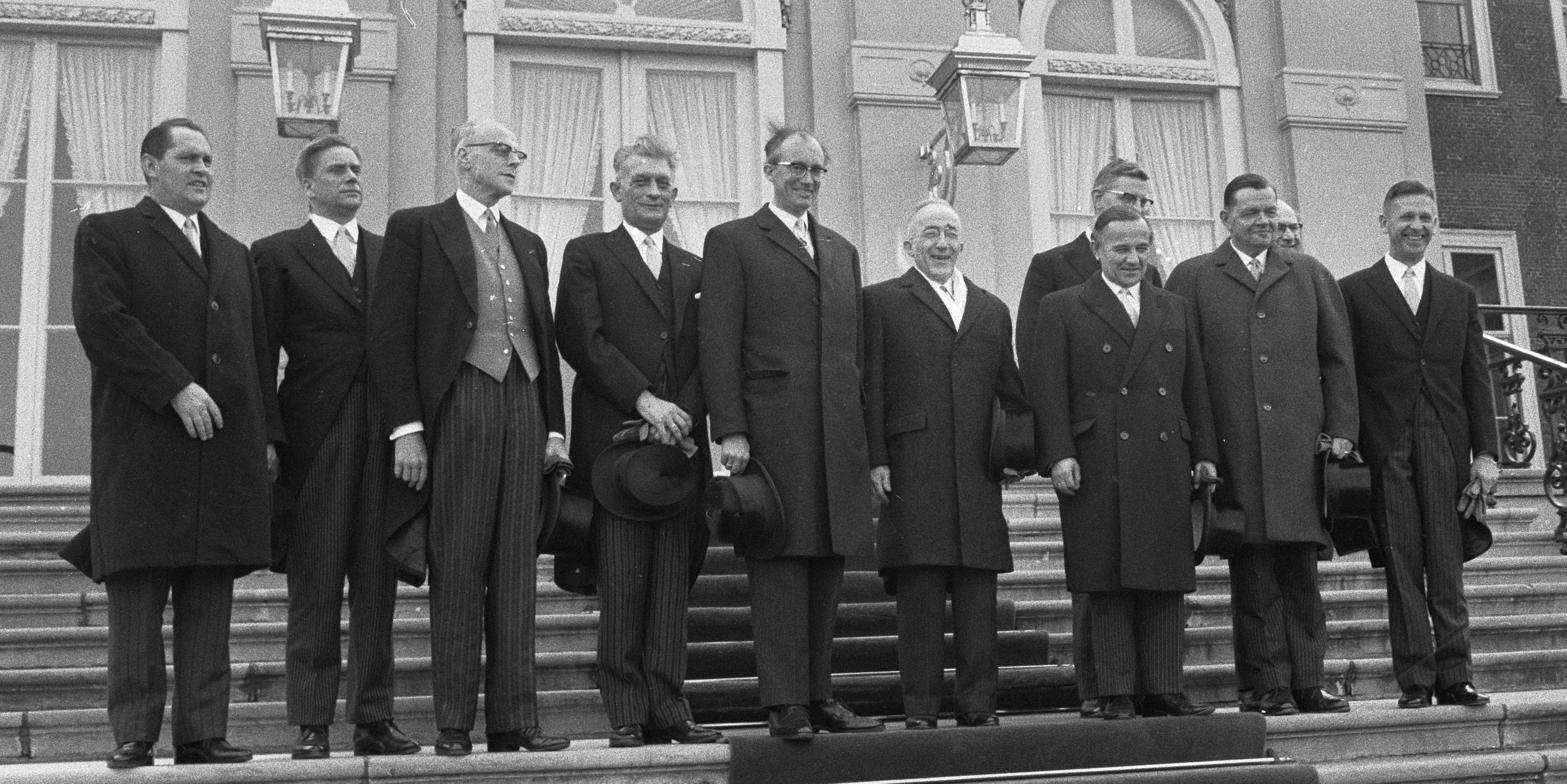
- The installation of the De Jong cabinet on 5 April 1967
- Date formed: 5 April 1967
- Date dissolved: 6 July 1971; 4 years, 92 days in office (Demissionary from 28 April 1971)

People and organisations
- Monarch: Queen Juliana
- Prime Minister: Piet de Jong
- Deputy Prime Minister: Johan Witteveen; Joop Bakker
- No. of ministers: 14
- Ministers removed: 1
- Total no. of members: 15
- Member party: Catholic People's Party (KVP); People's Party for Freedom and Democracy (VVD); Anti-Revolutionary Party (ARP); Christian Historical Union (CHU)
- Status in legislature: Centre-right; Majority government

History
- Incoming formation: 1967 formation
- Outgoing formation: 1971 formation
- Election: 1967 election
- Outgoing election: 1971 election
- Legislature terms: 1967–1971
- Predecessor: Zijlstra cabinet
- Successor: First Biesheuvel cabinet

The De Jong cabinet was the executive branch of the Dutch Government from 5 April 1967 until 6 July 1971. The cabinet was formed by the christian-democratic Catholic People's Party (KVP), Anti-Revolutionary Party (ARP) and Christian Historical Union (CHU) and the conservative-liberal People's Party for Freedom and Democracy (VVD) after the election of 1967. The cabinet was a centre-right coalition and had a substantial majority in the House of Representatives with prominent Catholic politician Piet de Jong the Minister of Defence in the previous cabinet serving as Prime Minister. Prominent Liberal politician Johan Witteveen a former Minister of Finances served as Deputy Prime Minister and returned as Minister of Finance, prominent Protestant politician Joop Bakker the Minister of Economic Affairs in the previous cabinet served as Deputy Prime Minister, Minister of Transport and Water Management and was given the portfolio of Suriname and Netherlands Antilles Affairs.

The cabinet served in the final years of the tumultuous 1960s and the beginning of the radical 1970s. Domestically it had to deal with the peak of the counterculture but it was able to implement several major social reforms to education, social security, the introduction of value-added taxes and it had to deal with several crises involving Moluccan nationalists. Internationally it oversaw improvements in relations with the former Dutch East Indies, growing protests against the Vietnam War and the fallout of the Soviet Union invasion of Czechoslovakia following the Prague Spring. The cabinet suffered no major internal conflicts and completed its entire term and was succeeded by the First Biesheuvel cabinet following the election of 1971.

== Formation ==
Following the fall of the Cals cabinet on 14 October 1966 the Labour Party (PvdA) left the coalition, subsequently Queen Juliana appointed Senator Jelle Zijlstra (ARP), a former Minister of Finance as Prime Minister to form a rump cabinet with the Catholic People's Party and the Anti-Revolutionary Party. On 22 November 1966 the Zijlstra cabinet was installed and served as a caretaker government until the election of 1967.

After the election on 15 February 1967 the Catholic People's Party was the winner of the election even after losing 8 seats and had now a total of 40 seats in the House of Representatives. Incumbent Prime Minister Jelle Zijlstra was appointed as Informateur by Queen Juliana to start the cabinet formation process. After a first round of talks the Catholic People's Party, People's Party for Freedom and Democracy, Anti-Revolutionary Party and the Christian Historical Union agreed to form a coalition. On 6 March 1967, Queen Juliana appointed Vice-President of the Council of State Louis Beel (KVP), a former Prime Minister as the new Informateur to start the next formation phase.

On 9 March 1967 incumbent Deputy Prime Minister and Minister of Agriculture and Fisheries Barend Biesheuvel, the Leader of the Anti-Revolutionary Party was asked to form a new cabinet and was asked to become Formateur. The negotiations were troubled by objections from the People's Party for Freedom and Democracy about prospect of Barend Biesheuvel as Prime Minister because he served in the previous Centre-left Cals cabinet. On 20 March 1967 after long negotiations between the parties, Barend Biesheuvel failed to form a cabinet. To break the deadlock the Catholic People's Party suggested that incumbent Minister of Defence Piet de Jong (KVP) would be a good candidate to form a new cabinet. Piet de Jong a former Naval officer who served as a World War II submarine commander had a good reputation as a pragmatic minister and was seen as a compromise candidate. On 21 March 1967 Piet de Jong was tasked with forming a new cabinet and was appointed as Formateur. On 4 April 1967 the cabinet formation was completed and the De Jong cabinet was installed the next day.

== Term ==
It was the first Cabinet of the Netherlands after World War II that completed a full term without any internal conflicts. The cabinet was confronted with a demand for democratic reforms in the society and it decided to democratise colleges and universities after the famous maagdenhuisbezetting. Plans were made to modernise politics by establishing an electoral system with districts or a chosen prime minister, but these plans were not implemented. Meanwhile, a pay pause due to the decision of employers and employees to raise wages was partly revoked after anti-government demonstrations and strikes. More unrest took shape in demonstrations against the war in Vietnam. Internationally, relations with Indonesia improved, resulting in a visit by president Suharto, which was, however, overshadowed by the occupation of the Indonesian embassy by Moluccans. The Soviet Union invasion in Czechoslovakia was seen as a reason to increase the defence budget.

=== Changes ===
On 7 January 1970, Minister of Economic Affairs Leo de Block (KVP) resigned after disagreeing with the cabinets decision to increase the wages in the metal industry, but another reason was that he had lost the credibility to remain in office after the House of Representatives was highly critical in his handling of the rising inflation after the introduction of the value-added tax (BTW) on 1 January 1969. Minister of Finance Johan Witteveen (VVD) served as acting Minister of Economic Affairs until 14 January 1970 when Member of the House of Representatives Roelof Nelissen (KVP) was appointed as his successor.

== Cabinet members ==
Ministers		Title/Ministry/Portfolio(s)			Term of office	Party
Piet de Jong	Piet de Jong (1915–2016)	Prime Minister	General Affairs		5 April 1967 – 6 July 1971	Catholic; People's Party
Johan Witteveen	Johan Witteveen (1921–2019)	Deputy; Prime Minister	Finance		5 April 1967 – 6 July 1971	People's Party for Freedom and Democracy
Johan Witteveen	Johan Witteveen (1921–2019)	Minister	Finance		5 April 1967 – 6 July 1971	People's Party for Freedom and Democracy
Joop Bakker	Joop Bakker (1921–2003)	Deputy; Prime Minister	Transport and Water Management		5 April 1967 – 6 July 197	Anti-Revolutionary; Party
Joop Bakker	Joop Bakker (1921–2003)	Minister	Transport and Water Management		5 April 1967 – 6 July 197	Anti-Revolutionary; Party
Joop Bakker	Joop Bakker (1921–2003)	Minister	Interior	• Suriname and Netherlands; Antilles Affairs	5 April 1967 – 6 July 197	Anti-Revolutionary; Party
Henk Beernink	Henk Beernink (1910–1979)	Minister	Interior		5 April 1967 – 6 July 1971	Christian; Historical Union
Joseph Luns	Joseph Luns (1911–2002)	Minister	Foreign Affairs		13 October 1956 – 6 July 1971^{[Retained]}	Catholic; People's Party
Carel Polak	Carel Polak (1909–1981)	Minister	Justice		5 April 1967 – 6 July 1971	People's Party for Freedom and Democracy
Leo de Block	Leo de Block (1904–1988)	Minister	Economic Affairs		5 April 1967 – 7 January 1970^{[Res]}	Catholic; People's Party
Johan Witteveen	Johan Witteveen (1921–2019)	Minister	Economic Affairs		7 January 1970 – 14 January 1970^{[Ad Interim]}	People's Party for Freedom and Democracy
Roelof Nelissen	Roelof Nelissen (1931–2019)	Minister	Economic Affairs		7 January 1970 – 14 January 1970	Catholic; People's Party
Willem den Toom	Lieutenant general Willem den Toom (1911–1998)	Minister	Defence		5 April 1967 – 6 July 1971	People's Party for Freedom and Democracy
Bauke Roolvink	Bauke Roolvink (1912–1979)	Minister	Social Affairs and Health		5 April 1967 – 6 July 1971	Anti-Revolutionary; Party
Gerard Veringa	Gerard Veringa (1924–1999)	Minister	Education and Sciences		5 April 1967 – 6 July 1971	Catholic; People's Party
Wim Schut	Wim Schut (1920–2006)	Minister	Housing and Spatial Planning		5 April 1967 – 6 July 1971	Anti-Revolutionary; Party
Pierre Lardinois	Pierre Lardinois (1924–1987)	Minister	Agriculture and Fisheries		5 April 1967 – 1 January 1973^{[Continued]}	Catholic; People's Party
Marga Klompé	Marga Klompé (1912–1986)	Minister	Culture, Recreation and Social Work		22 November 1966 – 7 January 1971^{[Retained]} ^{[Note]}	Catholic; People's Party
Gerard Veringa	Gerard Veringa (1924–1999)	Minister	Culture, Recreation and Social Work		7 January 1971 – 22 February 1971^{[Acting]}	Catholic; People's Party
Marga Klompé	Marga Klompé (1912–1986)	Minister	Culture, Recreation and Social Work		22 February 1971 – 6 July 1971	Catholic; People's Party
Minister without portfolio		Title/Ministry/Portfolio(s)			Term of office	Party
Bé Udink	Bé Udink (1926–2016)	Minister	Foreign Affairs	• Development; Cooperation	5 April 1967 – 6 July 1971	Christian; Historical Union
State Secretaries		Title/Ministry/Portfolio(s)			Term of office	Party
Chris van Veen	Chris van Veen (1922–2009)	State Secretary	Interior	• Municipalities • Provinces • civil service	10 May 1967 – 6 July 1971	Christian; Historical Union
Hans de Koster	Hans de Koster (1914–1992)	State Secretary	Foreign Affairs	• European Union • Benelux • NATO	12 June 1967 – 6 July 1971	People's Party for Freedom and Democracy
Ferd Grapperhaus I	Ferd Grapperhaus I (1927–2010)	State Secretary	Finance	• Fiscal Policy • Tax and Customs • Governmental; Budget	10 May 1967 – 6 July 1971	Catholic; People's Party
Klaas Wiersma	Klaas Wiersma (1917–1993)	State Secretary	Justice	• Immigration and Asylum • Penitentiaries	20 April 1970 – 6 July 1971	People's Party for Freedom and Democracy
Louis van Son	Louis van Son (1922–1986)	State Secretary	Economic Affairs	• Trade and Export • Small and Medium-sized; Businesses • Regional; Development • Consumer; Protection • Tourism	28 November 1966 – 6 July 1971^{[Retained]}	Catholic; People's Party
Joop Haex	Major General; Joop Haex (1911–2002)	State Secretary	Defence	• Army	18 April 1967 – 6 July 1971	Christian; Historical Union
Adri van Es	Vice admiral Adri van Es (1913–1994)	State Secretary	Defence	• Navy	14 August 1963 – 16 September 1972^{[Retained]} ^{[Continued]}	Anti-Revolutionary; Party
Bob Duynstee	Bob Duynstee (1920–2014)	State Secretary	Defence	• Air Force	28 April 1967 – 6 July 1971	Catholic; People's Party
Roelof Kruisinga	Roelof Kruisinga (1922–2012)	State Secretary	Social Affairs and Health	• Primary; Healthcare • Elderly Care • Disability Policy • Medical Ethics	18 April 1967 – 6 July 1971	Christian; Historical Union
Hans Grosheide	Hans Grosheide (1930–2022)	State Secretary	Education and Sciences	• Primary; Education • Secondary; Education • Special; Education	3 September 1963 – 6 July 1971^{[Retained]}	Anti-Revolutionary; Party
Mike Keyzer	Mike Keyzer (1911–1983)	State Secretary	Transport and Water Management	• Public; Transport • Aviation • Rail Transport • Water; Management • Weather; Forecasting	18 April 1967 – 6 July 1971	People's Party for Freedom and Democracy
Hein van de Poel	Hein van de Poel (1915–1993)	State Secretary	Culture, Recreation and Social Work	• Unemployment • Social Services • Youth Care • Nature • Culture • Art • Recreation • Sport	29 May 1967 – 6 July 1971	Catholic; People's Party

^{Resigned}
^{Retained from the previous cabinet}
^{Continued in the next cabinet}
^{Acting}
^{Ad Interim}
^{Medical leave of absence from 7 January 1971 until 22 February 1971}

== Trivia ==
- Six cabinet members had previous experience as scholars and professors: Johan Witteveen (Financial Economics), Carel Polak (Administrative and Agricultural Law), Gerard Veringa (Criminology and Criminal Law), Ferd Grapperhaus I (Fiscal Law), Klaas Wiersma (Civil Law) and Roelof Kruisinga (Otorhinolaryngology).
- Three cabinet members were flag officers: Willem den Toom (Lieutenant General in the Air Force), Joop Haex (Major General in the Army) and Adri van Es (Vice Admiral in the Navy).
- Eight cabinet members had served during World War II either in the military or the Resistance: Piet de Jong (Navy), Willem den Toom (Air Force), Wim Schut (Resistance), Marga Klompé (Resistance), Hans de Koster (Resistance), Joop Haex (Army), Adri van Es (Navy) and Bob Duynstee (Army).
- Four cabinet members (later) served as Party Leaders and Lijsttrekkers: Henk Beernink (1963–1967), Bé Udink (1970–1971) and Roelof Kruisinga (1971–1977) of the Christian Historical Union and Gerard Veringa (1971) of the Catholic People's Party.
- The age difference between the first Minister of Economic Affairs Leo de Block (born 1904) and his successor Roelof Nelissen (born 1931) was 26 years, 233 days.
