= Bob Duynstee =

Dutch politician (1920–2014)

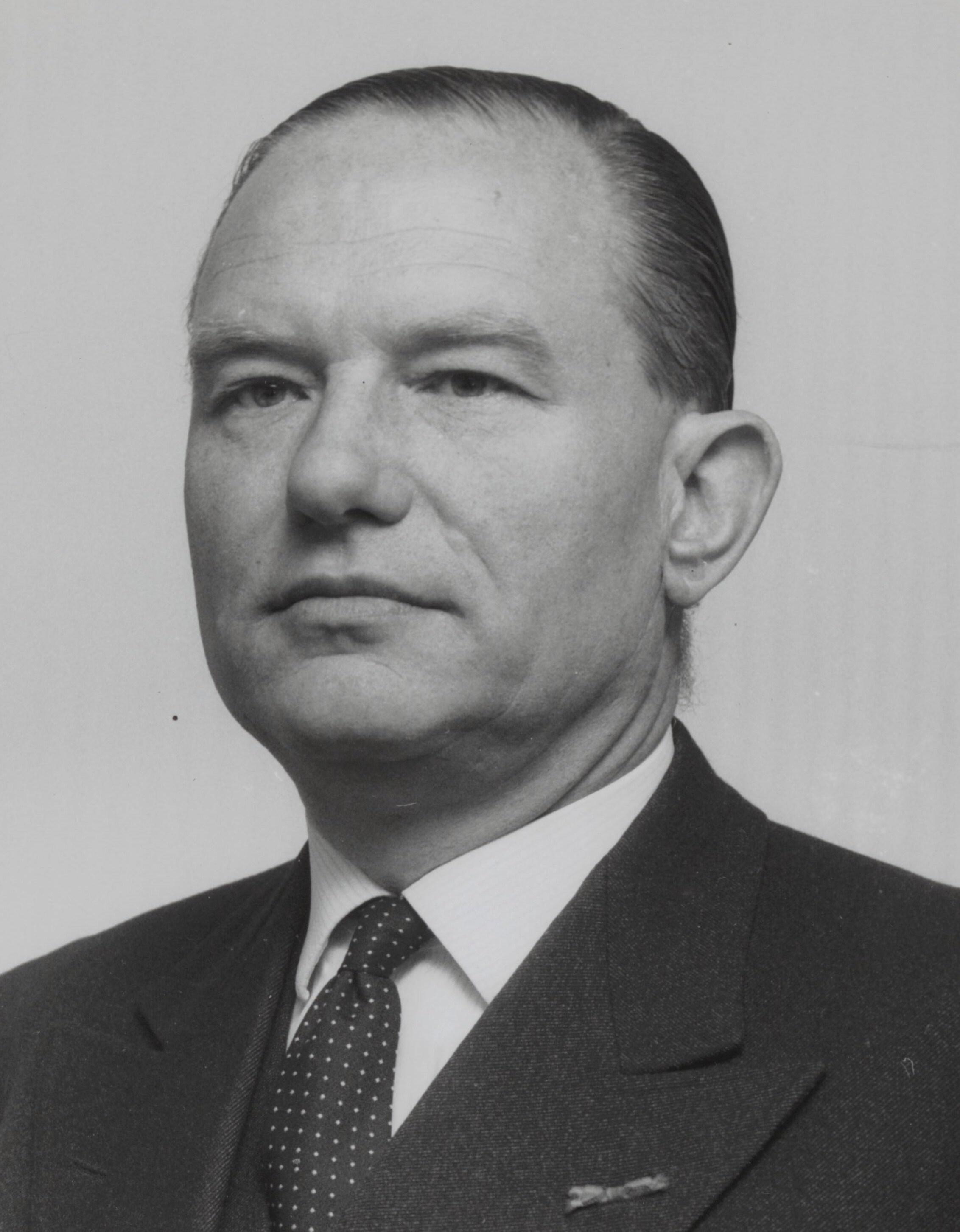
- Duynstee in 1967

State Secretary for Defence Air Force
- In office 28 April 1967 – 6 July 1971 Serving with Joop Haex; Adri van Es
- Prime Minister: Piet de Jong
- Preceded by: Heije Schaper
- Succeeded by: Adri van Es

Member of the House of Representatives
- In office 3 July 1956 – 22 February 1967
- Parliamentary group: Catholic People's Party

Personal details
- Born: Anthony Ernst Mary Duijnstee; 24 December 1920 Amsterdam, Netherlands
- Died: 9 May 2014 (aged 93) Maastricht, Netherlands
- Party: Catholic People's Party (1955–1980)
- Other political affiliations: Christian Democratic Appeal (from 1980); Catholic National Party (until 1955)
- Education: National University of Ireland (Bachelor of Economics, Master of Economics)
- Occupation: Politician; Economist; Businessman

Anthony Ernst Mary "Bob" Duynstee (original spelling Duijnstee; 24 December 1920 – 9 May 2014) was a Dutch politician who served as a member of the House of Representatives of the Netherlands between 1956 and 1967 and as State Secretary for Defence for the Royal Netherlands Air Force in the De Jong cabinet of 1967–71. He was a member of the Catholic People's Party.

== Career ==
Bremen was born on 24 December 1920 in Amsterdam, the son of a banker. He attended Clongowes Wood College in Dublin, Ireland to study between 1939-41. With World II unfolding in continental Europe, Duynstee was asked in August 1940 to be part of the Princess Irene Brigade which he did. In 1941 he was sent with around 90 fellow Dutchmen to Suriname, at that time a Dutch colony. In Suriname he was involved in the guarding of interned Germans and members of the NSB. By 1944 he had reached the rank of sergeant and returned to Western Europe.

After the war had ended Duynstee resumed his studies in Ireland. He earned a Bachelor of Commerce at the National University of Ireland in 1947 after having studied two years. The same year he earned a Master of Economic Science at the same university. He wrote a thesis titled Keynes theory of full employment and public finance.

In 1948 he joined the then newly founded Organisation for Economic Co-operation and Development where he headed the office for Scandinavian countries until 1952. Afterwards he went to work for Dutch airline KLM, to head the office for international cooperation between 1952 and 1956.

Duynstee was a member of the Catholic National Party until 1955. In the general election of 1956 Duynstee was elected to the House of Representatives for the Catholic People's Party and took his seat in the House on 3 July 1956. Between 1962 and 1967 he was member of the Defence Committee of the Assembly of the Western European Union. In the Committee he reported on the possibilities of a European nuclear force. In the general election of 1967 he was up for re-election but did not win a seat and his term in the House ended on 22 February 1967. He however was made State Secretary for Defence for the Royal Netherlands Air Force in the cabinet of Piet de Jong. He served in this position between 28 April 1967 and 6 July 1971. In the general election of 1971 he was once again not elected.

On 29 April 1966 he was made Knight in the Order of the Netherlands Lion, and on 17 July 1971 he was made Commander in the Order of Orange-Nassau.

Duynstee died on 9 May 2014 in Maastricht.
