= Hans de Koster =

Dutch politician (1914–1992)

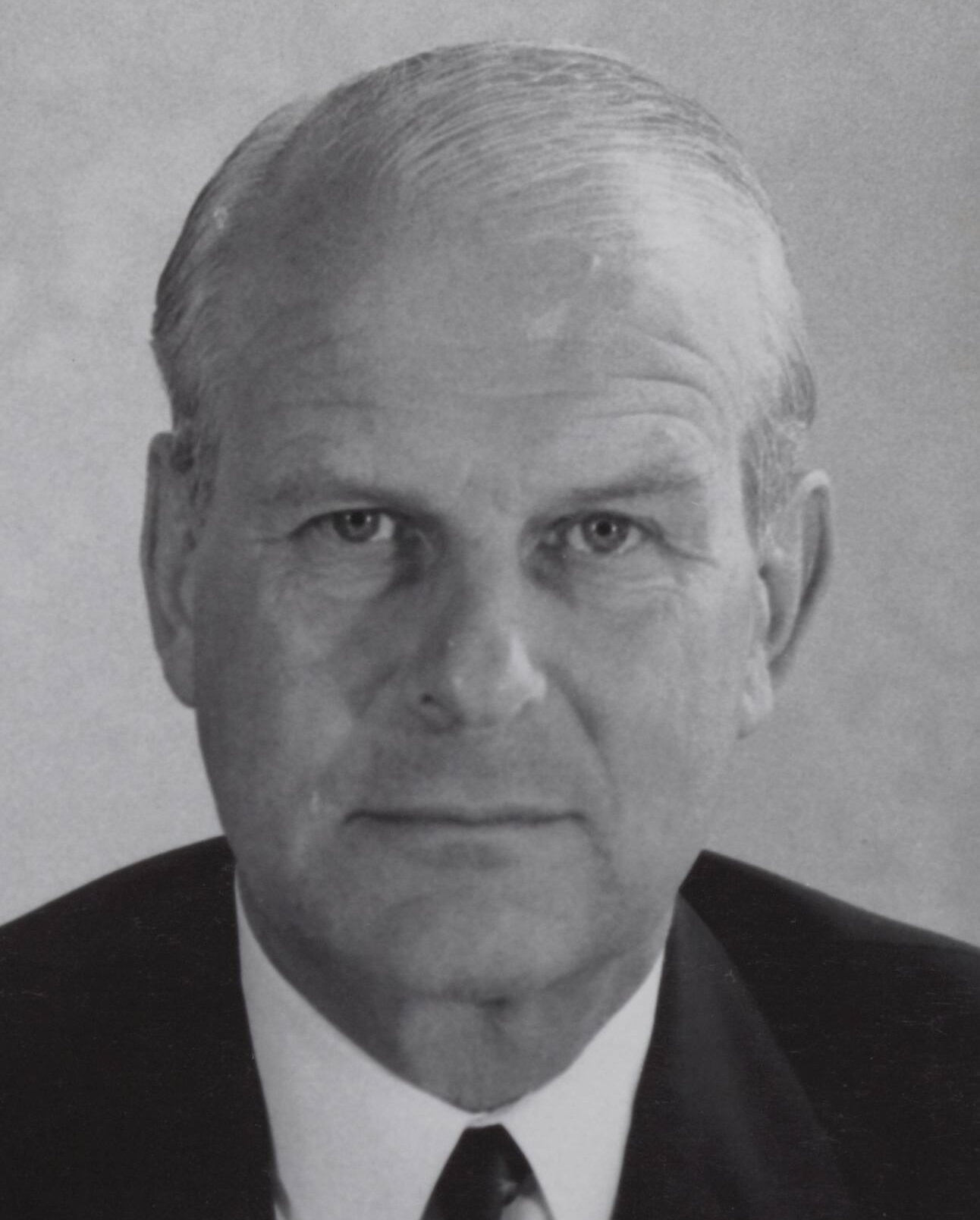
- De Koster in 1971

Extraordinary Member of the Council of State
- In office 16 May 1980 – 16 May 1985
- Vice President: Marinus Ruppert (1980); Willem Scholten (1980–1985)

President of the Parliamentary Assembly of the Council of Europe
- In office 1 January 1978 – 1 January 1981
- Preceded by: Karl Czernetz
- Succeeded by: José María de Areilza

Member of the Senate
- In office 20 September 1977 – 16 May 1980
- Parliamentary group: People's Party for Freedom and Democracy

President of the Benelux Parliament
- In office 1 January 1975 – 1 January 1976
- Preceded by: Ferdinand Boey
- Succeeded by: Jean Winkin

Minister of Defence
- In office 6 July 1971 – 11 May 1973
- Prime Minister: Barend Biesheuvel
- Preceded by: Willem den Toom
- Succeeded by: Henk Vredeling

State Secretary for Foreign Affairs
- In office 12 June 1967 – 6 July 1971
- Prime Minister: Piet de Jong
- Preceded by: Leo de Block
- Succeeded by: Tjerk Westerterp

Member of the House of Representatives
- In office 28 May 1973 – 8 June 1977
- In office 1 February 1973 – 1 May 1973
- In office 11 May 1971 – 6 July 1971
- In office 23 February 1967 – 12 June 1967
- Parliamentary group: People's Party for Freedom and Democracy

Member of the Social and Economic Council
- In office 1 April 1958 – 23 February 1967
- Chairman: See list: Frans de Vries (1958) Gerard Verrijn Stuart (1958–1964) Jan de Pous (1964–1967)

Personal details
- Born: Henri Johan de Koster; 5 November 1914 Leiden, Netherlands
- Died: 24 November 1992 (aged 78) Wassenaar, Netherlands
- Party: People's Party for Freedom and Democracy (from 1952)
- Spouse: Greta Burgersdijk (m. 1945)
- Education: University of Amsterdam (Bachelor of Economics)
- Occupation: Politician · Diplomat · Civil servant · Businessman · Corporate director · Nonprofit director · Trade association executive · Lobbyist

Henri Johan "Hans" de Koster (5 November 1914 – 24 November 1992) was a Dutch politician and diplomat of the People's Party for Freedom and Democracy (VVD) and businessman.

De Koster attended a Gymnasium in Leiden from May 1927 until June 1933 and applied at the University of Amsterdam in June 1933 majoring in Economics obtaining a Bachelor of Economics degree in June 1935. De Koster worked as a corporate director for the flour manufacturer De Koster & Co in Leiden from April 1937 until May 1940. On 10 May 1940 Nazi Germany invaded the Netherlands and the government fled to London to escape the German occupation. De Koster joined the Dutch resistance against the German occupiers and founded and led the resistance cell Peggy. Following the end of World War II De Koster worked as a civil servant for the Diplomatic service of the Ministry of Foreign Affairs as an Attaché at the League of Nations in New York from June 1945 until April 1946. De Koster again worked as a corporate director for the flour manufacturer De Koster & Co from April 1946 until February 1967 and was Chief executive officer (CEO) from January 1947 until September 1964. De Koster also worked as a trade association executive for the Industry and Employers' association (VNO) from April 1956 until February 1967 and served as Vice Chairman of the Executive Board from 12 March 1958 until 18 May 1961 and as Chairman of the Executive Board from 18 May 1961 until 12 June 1967 and served as a Member of the Social and Economic Council from 1 April 1958 until 23 February 1967. De Koster also served as President of the Confederation of European Business from 1 May 1962 until 12 June 1967.

De Koster was elected as a Member of the House of Representatives after the election of 1967, taking office on 23 February 1967. Following the cabinet formation of 1967 De Koster was appointed as State Secretary for Foreign Affairs in the Cabinet De Jong, taking office on 12 June 1967. After the election of 1971 De Koster returned as a Member of the House of Representatives, taking office on 11 May 1971. Following the cabinet formation of 1971 De Koster was appointed as Minister of Defence in the Cabinet Biesheuvel I, taking office on 6 July 1971. The Cabinet Biesheuvel I fell just one year later on 19 July 1972 and continued to serve in a demissionary capacity until the first cabinet formation of 1972 when it was replaced by the caretaker Cabinet Biesheuvel II with De Koster continuing as Minister of Defence, taking office on 9 August 1972. After the election of 1972 De Koster again returned as a Member of the House of Representatives, taking office on 1 February 1973 but he was still serving in the cabinet and because of dualism customs in the constitutional convention of Dutch politics he couldn't serve a dual mandate he subsequently resigned as a Member of the House of Representatives on 1 May 1973. The Cabinet Biesheuvel II was replaced by the Cabinet Den Uyl following the second cabinet formation of 1972 on 11 May 1973 and he subsequently returned as Member of the House of Representatives, taking office on 28 May 1973 serving as a frontbencher and spokesperson for Foreign Affairs, European Affairs, NATO and Defence. De Koster also served as President of the Benelux Parliament from 1 January 1975 until 1 January 1976. In April 1977 De Koster announced that he wouldn't stand for the election of 1977 but wanted to run for the Senate and continued to serve until the end of the parliamentary term on 8 June 1977. De Koster was elected as a Member of the Senate after the Senate election of 1977, taking office on 20 September 1977 serving as a frontbencher chairing the parliamentary committee for Foreign Affairs and spokesperson for Foreign Affairs, European Affairs, NATO, Benelux, Defence and Veterans' affairs. De Koster also served as President of the Parliamentary Assembly of the Council of Europe from 1 January 1978 until 1 January 1981. In April 1980 De Koster was nominated as Extraordinary Member of the Council of State, he resigned as a Member of the Senate the same day he was installed as a Member of the Council of State, serving from 16 May 1980 until 16 May 1985.

De Koster retired after spending 18 years in national politics and became active in the private sector and public sector and occupied numerous seats as a corporate director and nonprofit director on several boards of directors and supervisory boards (Randstad NV, Douwe Egberts, ASML Holding and the Atlantic Association) and serves on several state commissions and councils on behalf of the government (Adviesraad Internationale Vraagstukken) and as a diplomat and lobbyist for several economic delegations on behalf of the government and as an advocate for European integration.

== Biography ==
=== Early life ===
Hans de Koster graduated from Higher Civic School and earned his bachelor's degree in economics in Amsterdam. He then continued his studies abroad.

He worked at Koster & Co in Leiden, a flour mill renamed in 1928 as N.V. De Sleutels (now Meelfabriek).

== World War II ==
During World War II, de Koster led the espionage group "Peggy". He promoted plans to assist the Dutch population and for Dutch economic recovery and he was in clandestine communication with Britain.

De Koster was friends with the Dutch royal family and especially with Prince Bernhard.

== Politics ==
In 1946 he became director at N.V. De Sleutels, like his grandfather. In 1964, Keys was acquired by Meneba, and for three years de Koster was a board member.

In the De Jong cabinet (1967-1971), he was State Secretary for Foreign Affairs on behalf of the People's Party for Freedom and Democracy (Dutch: Volkspartij voor Vrijheid en Democratie, VVD). He was subsequently defence minister in two Biesheuvel cabinets (1971-1972 and 1972-1973).

In 1972 de Koster presented the Rijckevorsel Commission report which proposed changes in the Dutch armed forces, including a major reduction in the army and transfer of Air Force roles to NATO partners, build a training area at Ter Apel and the first step towards a volunteer professional army.

After his time as minister, he was a member of the Dutch House of Representatives and spokesman on Foreign Affairs of the VVD (1973-1977) and from 1977 to 1980 he was a member of the Dutch Senate. From 1978 to 1981 he was Chairman of the Consultative Assembly of the Council of Europe.

From his personal archives, released in 2005, it was revealed that he breached the confidentiality of the private fixed Parliamentary Committee for Defence in June 1975, and the prince was informed about the developments. He also knew through a filibuster during a meeting of the committee to avoid research into the prince.

== Decorations ==
Military decorations
Ribbon bar	Decoration	Country	Date	Comment
	Bronze Lion	Netherlands	14 December 1949	
	Resistance Memorial Cross	Netherlands	30 April 1982	

Honours
Ribbon bar	Honour	Country	Date	Comment
	Knight of the Order of the Netherlands Lion	Netherlands	29 April 1966	
	Grand Officer of the Order of the Crown	Belgium	1 September 1970	
	Commander of the Legion of Honour	France	12 May 1972	
	Grand Officer of the Order of Orange-Nassau	Netherlands	8 June 1973	

Political offices
Preceded by Leo de Block	State Secretary for Foreign Affairs; 1967–1971	Succeeded by Tjerk Westerterp
Preceded by Willem den Toom	Minister of Defence; 1971–1973	Succeeded by Henk Vredeling
Preceded by Ferdinand Boey	President of the Benelux Parliament; 1975–1976	Succeeded by Jean Winkin
Preceded by Karl Czernetz	President of the Parliamentary; Assembly of the Council of Europe; 1978–1981	Succeeded by José María de Areilza
Business positions
Preceded by Georges Villiers	President of the Confederation of European Business; 1962–1967	Succeeded by Rudolf Fredrik Berg
