= Joop Haex =

Dutch politician (1911–2002)

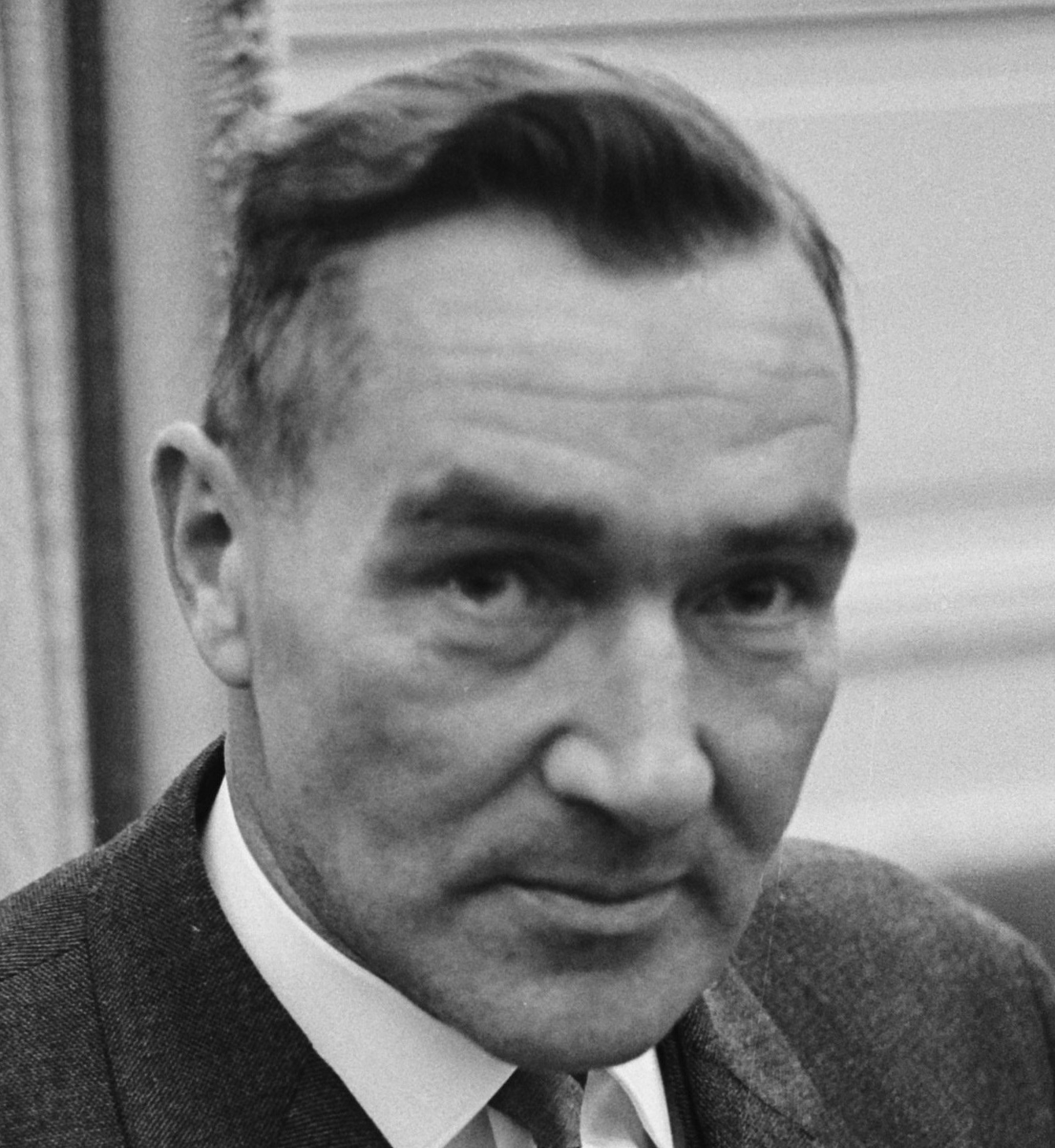
- Haex in 1963

State Secretary for Defence
- In office 18 April 1967 – 6 July 1971 Serving with Adri van Es; Bob Duynstee
- Prime Minister: Piet de Jong
- Preceded by: Gerard Peijnenburg
- Succeeded by: Adri van Es
- In office 14 August 1963 – 14 April 1965 Serving with Adri van Es; Willem den Toom
- Prime Minister: Victor Marijnen
- Preceded by: Michael Calmeyer
- Succeeded by: Gerard Peijnenburg

Personal details
- Born: Joseph Constant Eugène Haex; 24 November 1911 Maastricht, Netherlands
- Died: 14 April 2002 (aged 90) Wassenaar, Netherlands
- Party: Christian Democratic Appeal (from 1980)
- Other political affiliations: Democratic Socialists '70 (1971–1975); Christian Historical Union (1963–1971, 1975–1980)
- Spouse: Françoise Molière (m. 1939; died 1989)
- Education: Royal Military Academy
- Occupation: Politician · Army Officer · Corporate director · Nonprofit director

Military service
- Allegiance: Netherlands
- Branch/service: Royal Netherlands Army
- Years of service: 1935–1963 (Active duty); 1963–1971 (Reserve)
- Rank: Lieutenant general
- Battles/wars: World War II; Battle of the Netherlands; Battle of France

Joseph Constant Eugène "Joop" Haex (24 November 1911 – 14 April 2002) was a Dutch politician of the defunct Christian Historical Union (CHU) now merged into the Christian Democratic Appeal (CDA), an army officer and lieutenant general of the Royal Netherlands Army he served during World War II and the post-war years. Even though Haex was a Catholic, he became a member of the Protestant Christian Historical Union on the recommendation of minister of Defence Piet de Jong in order to balance the portfolio allocation of the cabinet.

== Decorations ==
Military decorations
Ribbon bar	Decoration	Country	Date	Comment
	War Memorial Cross	Netherlands	5 May 1946	
	Mobilisation War Cross	Netherlands	1 June 1945	
	Distinction sign for Long-term, Honest and Loyal Service	Netherlands	14 August 1963	Honorable discharge
Honours
Ribbon bar	Honour	Country	Date	Comment
	Knight of the Order of the Netherlands Lion	Netherlands	20 April 1965	
	Commander of the Order of Orange-Nassau	Netherlands	17 July 1971	Elevated from Officer (1 September 1966)

Political offices
Preceded by Michael Calmeyer	State Secretary for Defence; 1963–1965; 1967–1971; Served alongside: Adri van Es (1963–1971); Willem den Toom (1963–1965); Bob Duynstee (1967–1971)	Succeeded by Gerard Peijnenburg
Preceded by Gerard Peijnenburg	State Secretary for Defence; 1963–1965; 1967–1971; Served alongside: Adri van Es (1963–1971); Willem den Toom (1963–1965); Bob Duynstee (1967–1971)	Succeeded by Adri van Es
