= Willem den Toom =

Dutch politician (1911–1998)

His Excellency Willem den Toom
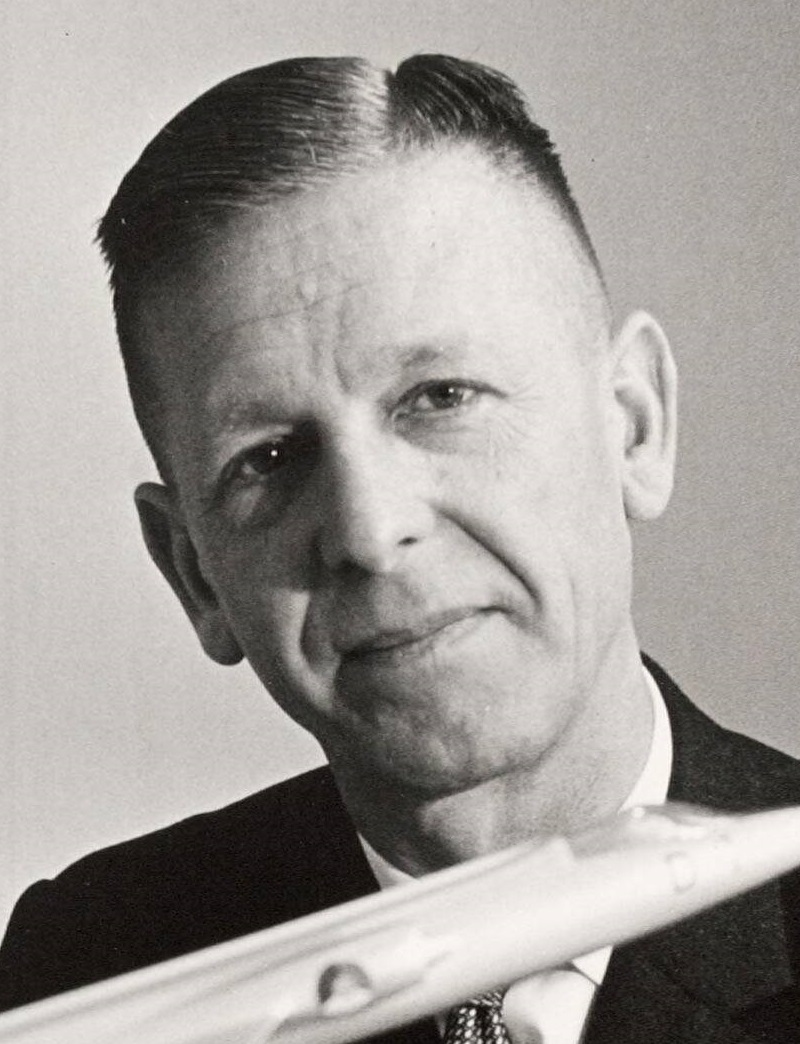
- Den Toom in 1968

Minister of Defence
- In office 5 April 1967 – 6 July 1971
- Prime Minister: Piet de Jong
- Preceded by: Piet de Jong
- Succeeded by: Hans de Koster

State Secretary for Defence
- In office 25 November 1963 – 14 April 1965 Serving with Joop Haex; Adri van Es
- Prime Minister: Victor Marijnen
- Preceded by: Michael Calmeyer
- Succeeded by: Jan Borghouts

Personal details
- Born: Willem den Toom; 11 July 1911 Rotterdam, Netherlands
- Died: 13 December 1998 (aged 87) Amersfoort, Netherlands
- Party: People's Party for Freedom and Democracy (from 1963)
- Spouse: Mijntje van Toorn (m. 1930; died 1990)
- Education: Royal Military Academy
- Occupation: Politician · Air Force Officer · Corporate director · Nonprofit director · Author · Editor · Political pundit · Activist · Lobbyist

Military service
- Allegiance: Netherlands
- Branch/service: Royal Netherlands Army (1933–1953); Royal Netherlands Air Force (1953–1965)
- Years of service: 1933–1963 (Active duty); 1963–1965 (Reserve)
- Rank: Lieutenant general
- Battles/wars: World War II; Battle of the Netherlands; Battle of France

Willem den Toom (11 July 1911 – 13 December 1998) was a Dutch politician of the People's Party for Freedom and Democracy (VVD) and military officer.

== Decorations ==
Military decorations
Ribbon bar	Decoration	Country	Date	Comment
	War Memorial Cross	Netherlands	5 May 1946	
	Mobilisation War Cross	Netherlands	1 June 1945	
	Distinction sign for Long-term, Honest and Loyal Service	Netherlands	1 May 1963	Honorable discharge
Honours
Ribbon bar	Honour	Country	Date	Comment
	Knight of the Order of the Netherlands Lion	Netherlands	20 April 1965	
	Commander of the Order of Orange-Nassau	Netherlands	17 July 1971	

Political offices
Preceded by Michael Calmeyer	State Secretary for Defence; 1963–1965; Served alongside: Joop Haex; Adri van Es	Succeeded by Jan Borghouts
Preceded by Piet de Jong	Minister of Defence; 1967–1971	Succeeded by Hans de Koster
Non-profit organization positions
Preceded by Office established	Chairman of the Institute for Peace Issues; 1969–1983	Succeeded by Henk Neuman as Chairman of the Clingendael Institute
