= Piet de Jong =

Prime Minister of the Netherlands from 1967 to 1971

His Excellency Piet de Jong
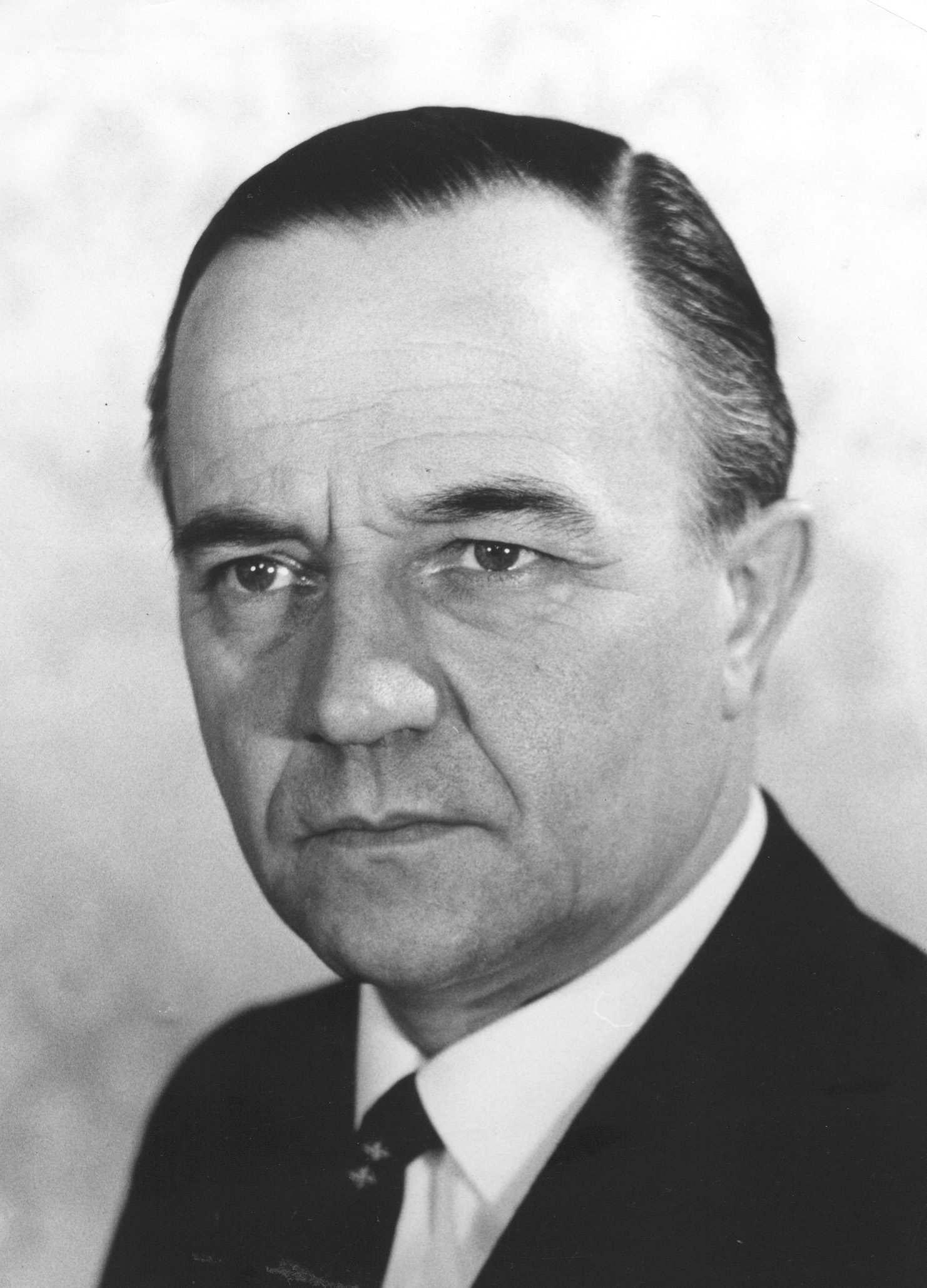
- De Jong in 1970

Prime Minister of the Netherlands
- In office 5 April 1967 – 6 July 1971
- Monarch: Juliana
- Deputy: Johan Witteveen; Joop Bakker
- Preceded by: Jelle Zijlstra
- Succeeded by: Barend Biesheuvel

Parliamentary leader in the Senate
- In office 11 May 1971 – 17 September 1974
- Preceded by: Jan Niers
- Succeeded by: Jan Teijssen
- Parliamentary group: Catholic People's Party

Member of the Senate
- In office 11 May 1971 – 17 September 1974

Member of the House of Representatives
- In office 23 February 1967 – 5 April 1967

Minister of Defence
- In office 24 July 1963 – 5 April 1967
- Prime Minister: See list: Victor Marijnen (1963–1965) Jo Cals (1965–1966) Jelle Zijlstra (1966–1967)
- Preceded by: Sim Visser
- Succeeded by: Willem den Toom

State Secretary for Defence
- In office 25 June 1959 – 24 July 1963 Serving with Michael Calmeyer
- Prime Minister: Jan de Quay
- Preceded by: Harry Moorman
- Succeeded by: Adri van Es

Personal details
- Born: Petrus Jozef Sietse de Jong; 3 April 1915 Apeldoorn, Netherlands
- Died: 27 July 2016 (aged 101) The Hague, Netherlands
- Party: Christian Democratic Appeal (from 1980)
- Other political affiliations: Catholic People's Party (1959–1980)
- Spouse: Anneke Bartels (m. 1947; died 2010)
- Children: 3
- Education: Royal Naval College
- Occupation: Politician · Diplomat · Naval officer · Businessperson · Corporate director · Nonprofit director
- Awards: Order of Orange-Nassau (Knight Grand Cross); Bronze Cross (2); Distinguished Service Cross; Medal for Order and Peace; War Memorial Cross

Military service
- Allegiance: Netherlands
- Branch/service: Royal Netherlands Navy
- Years of service: 1931–1959 (Active duty); 1959–1963 (Reserve)
- Rank: Captain
- Unit: Royal Netherlands; Navy Submarine Service
- Commands: HNLMS O 24; HNLMS De Zeeuw; HNLMS Gelderland
- Battles/wars: World War II; Battle of the Netherlands; Battle of France; Battle of the Atlantic; Pacific War; Cold War; Korean War
- Aide-de-camp: Queen Juliana (1955–1958)
- Chief of staff: Inspector General of the Navy Prince Bernhard (1955–1958)

Petrus Jozef Sietse "Piet" de Jong (Dutch pronunciation: [ˈpeːtrʏ ˈɕoːzəf ˈsitsə ˈpi(d) də ˈjɔŋ]; 3 April 1915 – 27 July 2016) was a Dutch politician and naval officer who served as Prime Minister of the Netherlands from 1967 to 1971. He was a member of the Catholic People's Party (KVP), later merged into the Christian Democratic Appeal (CDA).

De Jong applied at the Royal Naval College in Den Helder and graduated as an ensign in the Navy and joined the Submarine Service. During World War II he served on the submarine HNLMS O 24 as First Officer and later as commanding officer and saw action in both the Battle of the Atlantic and the Pacific War. After the War De Jong served as a staff officer and commanded a frigate and destroyer. After the 1959 general election, De Jong was unexpectedly appointed as State Secretary for Defence tasked with Naval Affairs taking office on 25 June 1959. After the 1963 general election, De Jong was appointed as Minister of Defence in the Marijnen cabinet taking office on 24 July 1963. The Marijnen cabinet fell 19 months into its term and was replaced by the Cals cabinet with De Jong continuing his office. The Cals cabinet fell just one year later and was replaced by the caretaker Zijlstra cabinet and De Jong again retained his position. After the 1967 general election, De Jong was elected to the House of Representatives on 23 February 1967. Following several failed coalition attempts De Jong was asked to lead a new cabinet and following a successful cabinet formation formed the De Jong cabinet and became Prime Minister of the Netherlands taking office on 5 April 1967.

For the 1971 general election the Catholics declined to nominate De Jong as lead candidate and shortly thereafter De Jong announced that he would not stand for the election. De Jong left office following the installation of the Biesheuvel I cabinet on 6 July 1971. De Jong continued to be active in politics and was elected to the Senate after the 1971 Senate election and became parliamentary leader serving from 11 May 1971 until 17 September 1974.

De Jong retired from active politics at 59 and became active in the private and public sectors as a corporate and non-profit director and served on several state commissions and councils and as a diplomat and lobbyist for several economic delegations on behalf of the government. De Jong was known for his abilities as an effective team leader and skillful negotiator. During his premiership, his cabinet was responsible for several major reforms to education, social security, taxes, overseeing improvement in relations with the former Dutch East Indies, handling the Counterculture of the 1960s, the fallout of the Vietnam War and dealing with several major crises such as the Moluccans incidents. De Jong continued to comment on political affairs as a statesman until his death in July 2016 at the age of 101. He holds the distinction as the first prime minister after World War II to complete a full term without any internal conflicts and holds the record as the second longest-lived Prime Minister, after Willem Drees, at 101 years, 115 days. His premiership is consistently regarded both by scholars and the public to have been one of the best in Dutch history.

== Early life ==
Petrus Jozef Sietse de Jong was born on 3 April 1915 in Apeldoorn in the Netherlands province of Gelderland in a Roman Catholic family that originated from Friesland, as the sixth of seven children of Joännes Jans de Jong (24 February 1878 – 28 November 1931), a railroad superintendent, and Gijsberta Adriana Schouten (29 December 1877 – 30 June 1957). After leaving secondary school, de Koninklijke Hogereburgerschool (now de Koninklijke Scholengemeenschap), he joined the Royal Netherlands Navy as a midshipman in 1931 and subsequently attended the Royal Netherlands Naval College in Den Helder. In 1934, he received his commission as a sub-lieutenant.

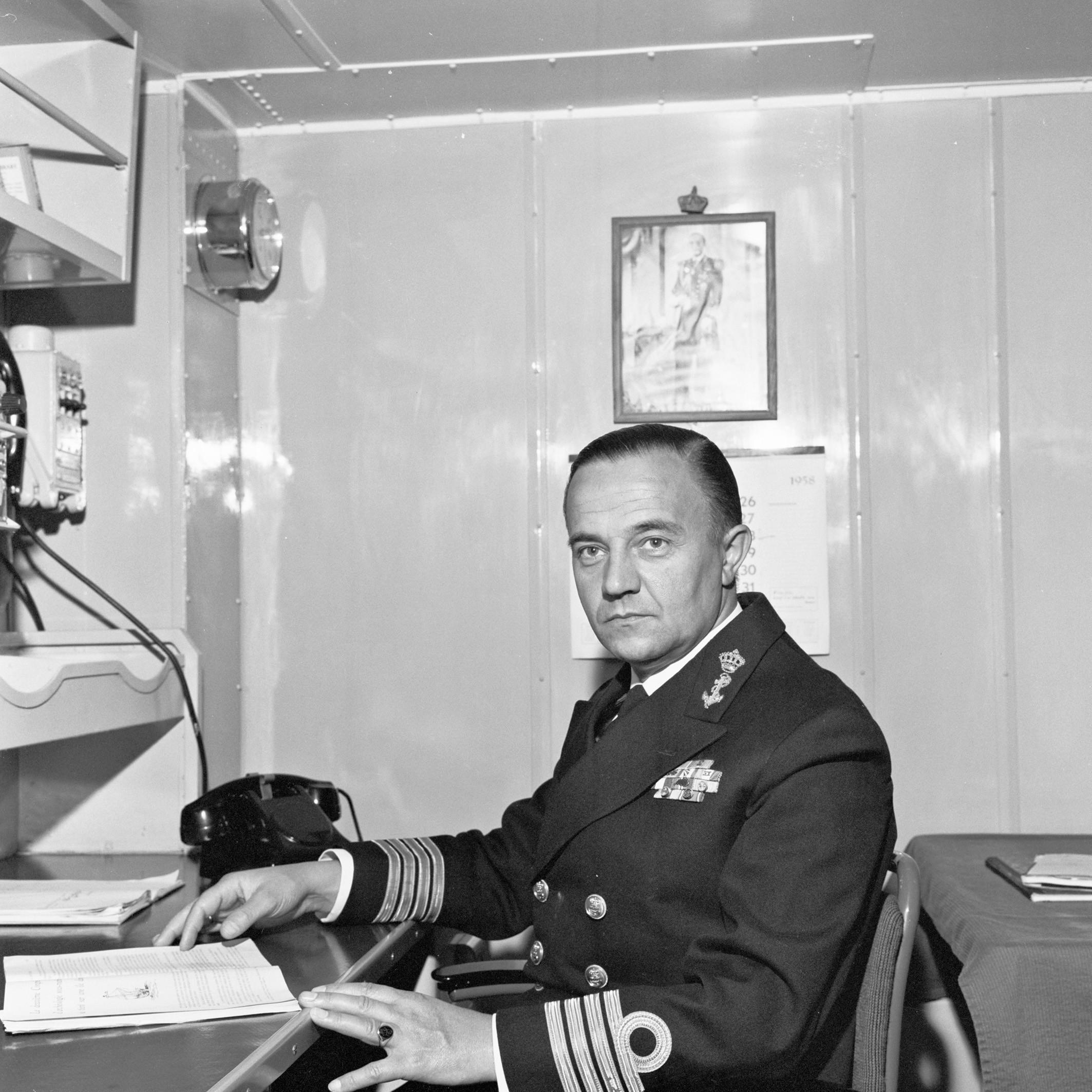
Captain Piet de Jong as commanding officer on HNLMS Gelderland in 1958.

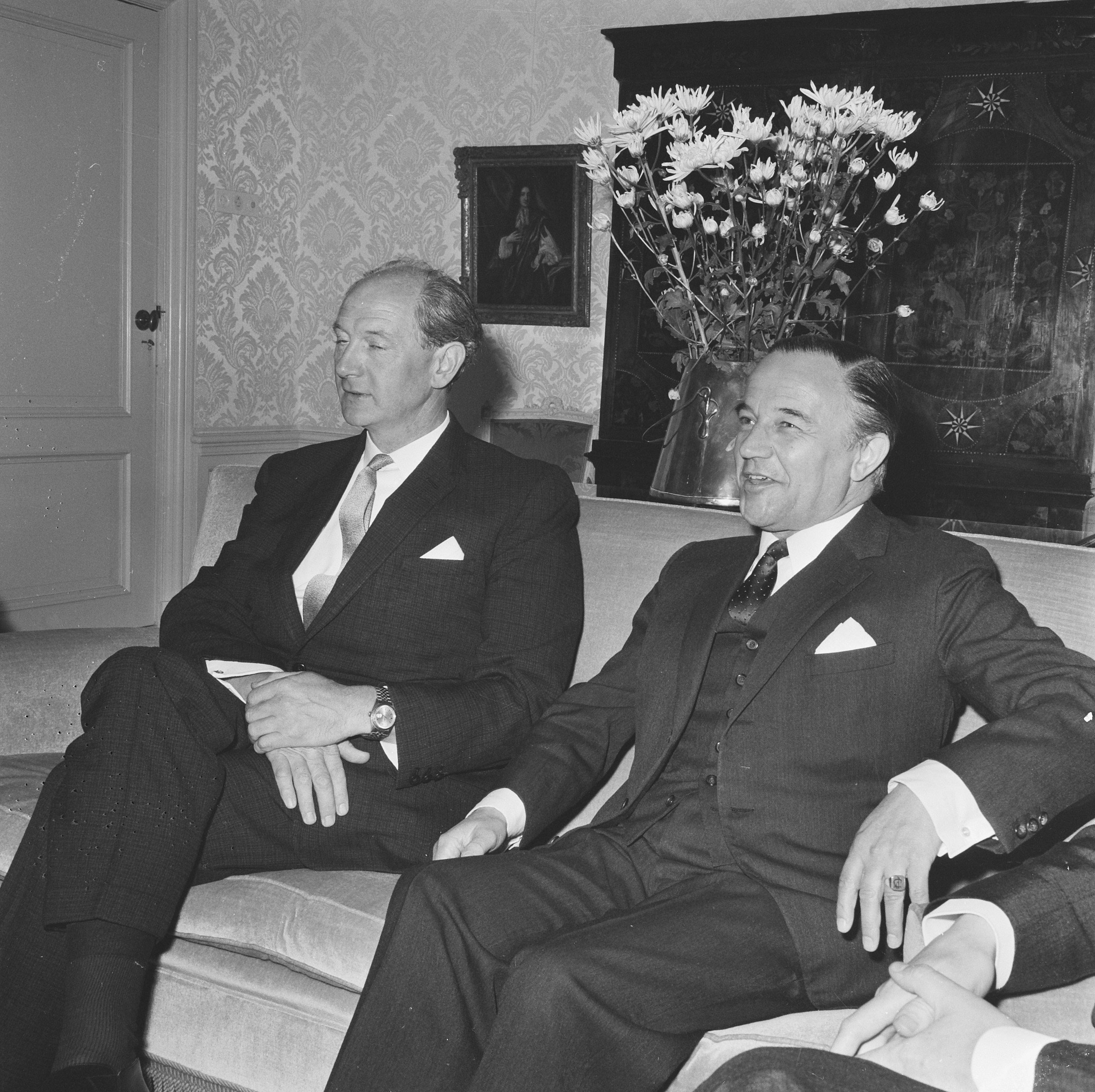
Taoiseach of Ireland Jack Lynch and Prime Minister Piet de Jong during a meeting at the Ministry of General Affairs on 22 June 1967.

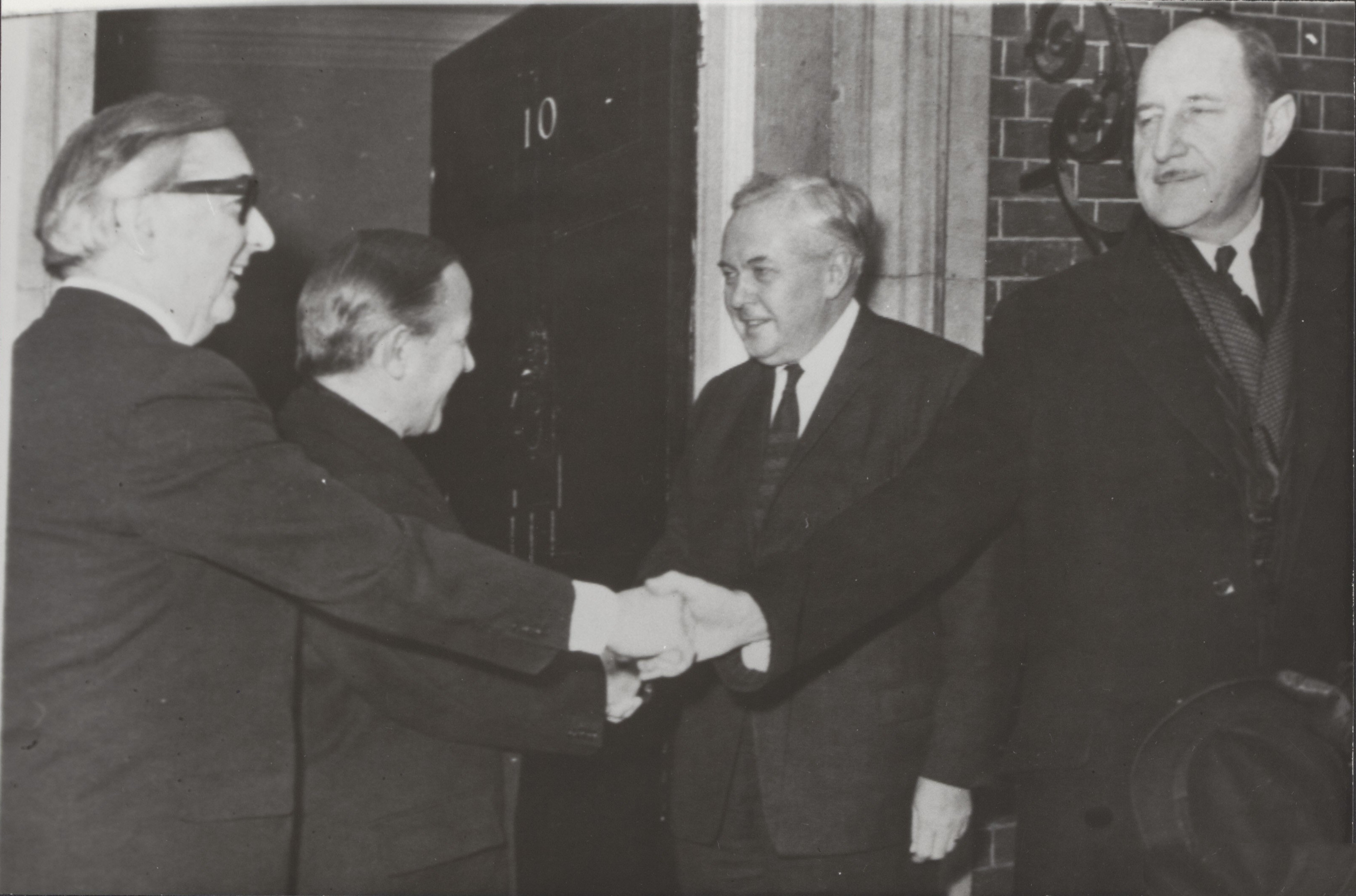
Secretary of State for Foreign of the United Kingdom George Brown, Prime Minister Piet de Jong, Prime Minister of the United Kingdom Harold Wilson and Minister of Foreign Affairs Joseph Luns at 10 Downing Street on 19 February 1968.

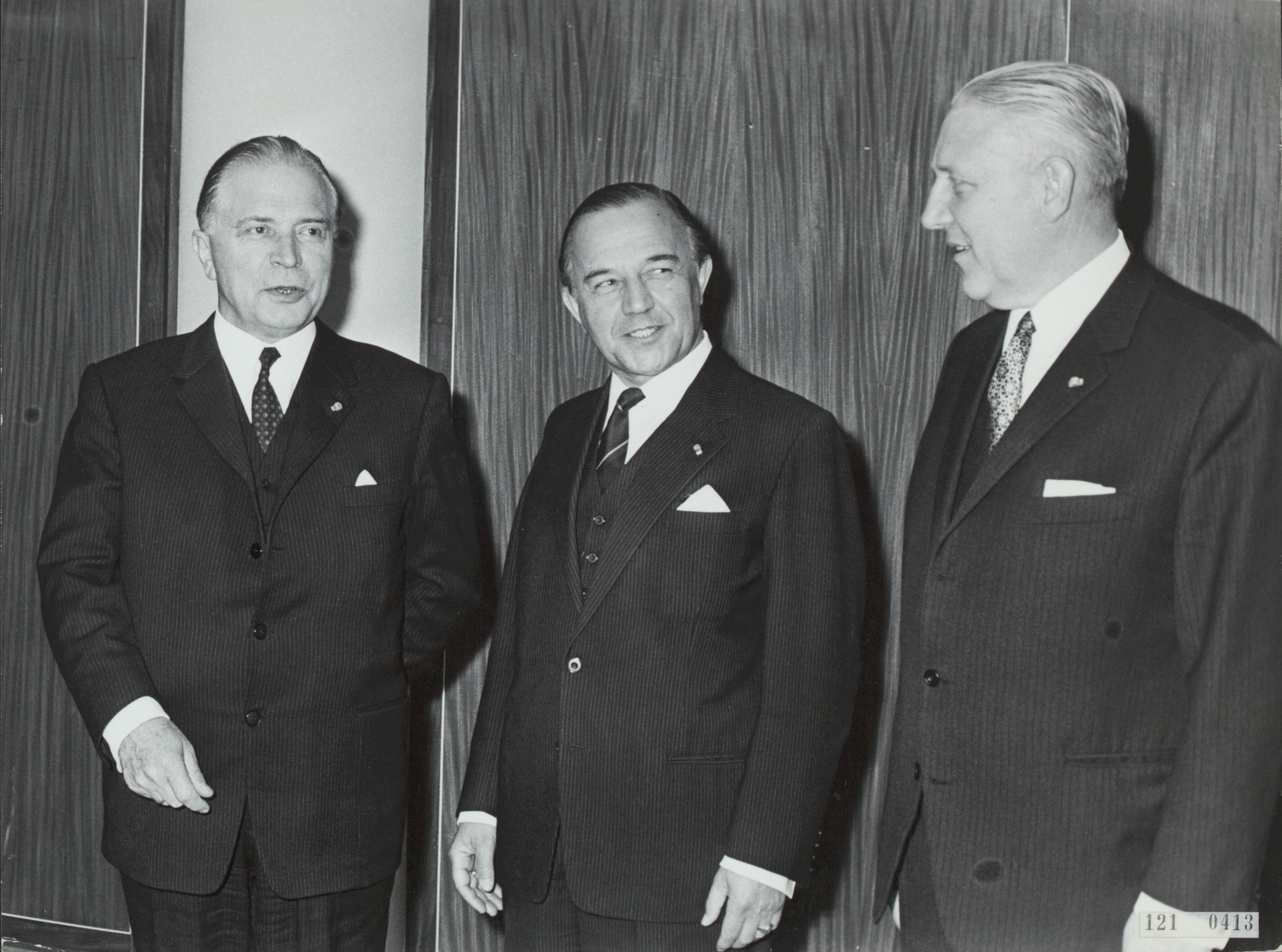
Prime Minister of Luxembourg Pierre Werner, Prime Minister Piet de Jong and Prime Minister of Belgium Gaston Eyskens during a Benelux conference in The Hague on 28 April 1968.

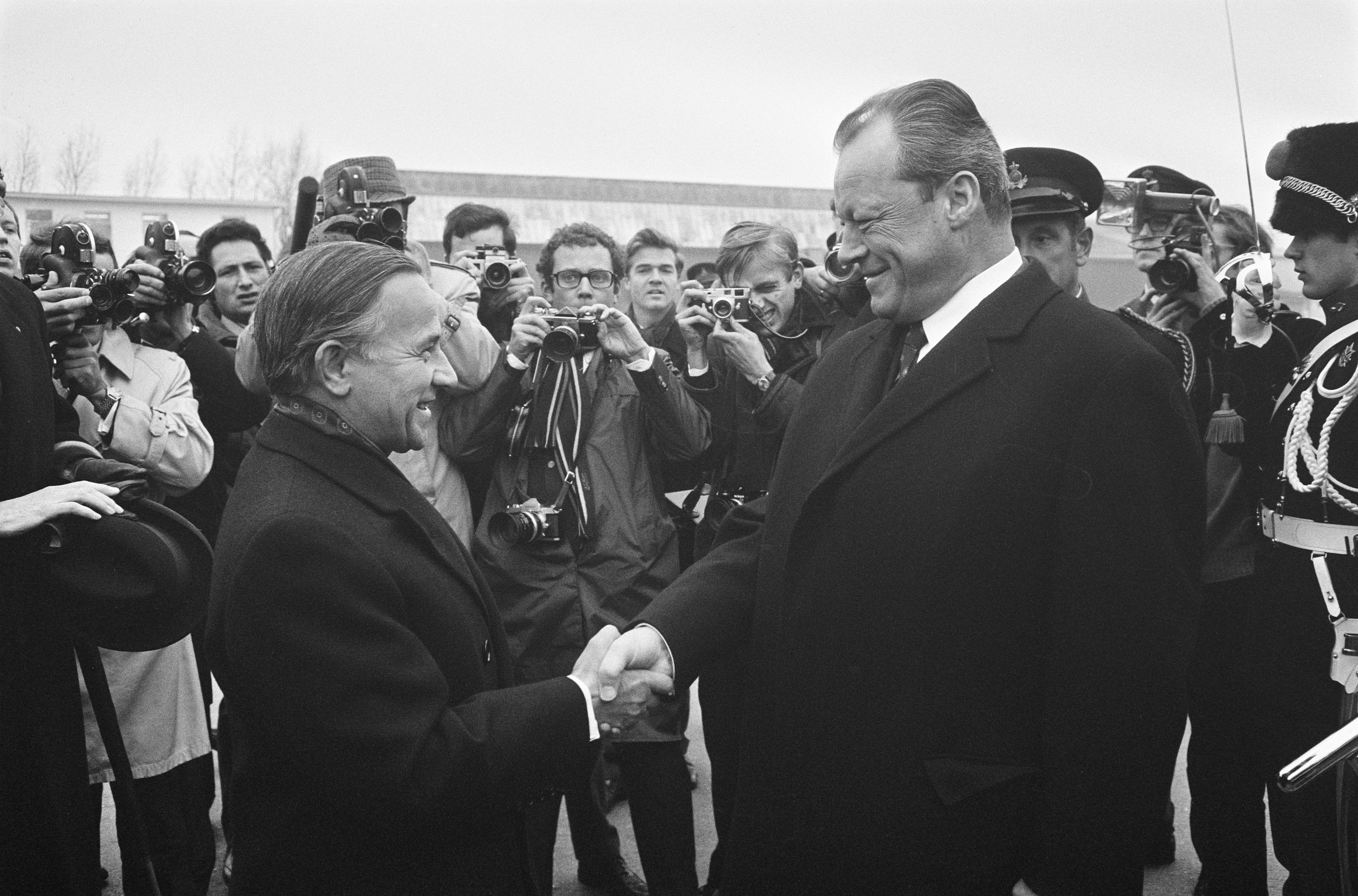
Prime Minister Piet de Jong and Chancellor of West Germany Willy Brandt at Ypenburg Airport on 1 December 1969.

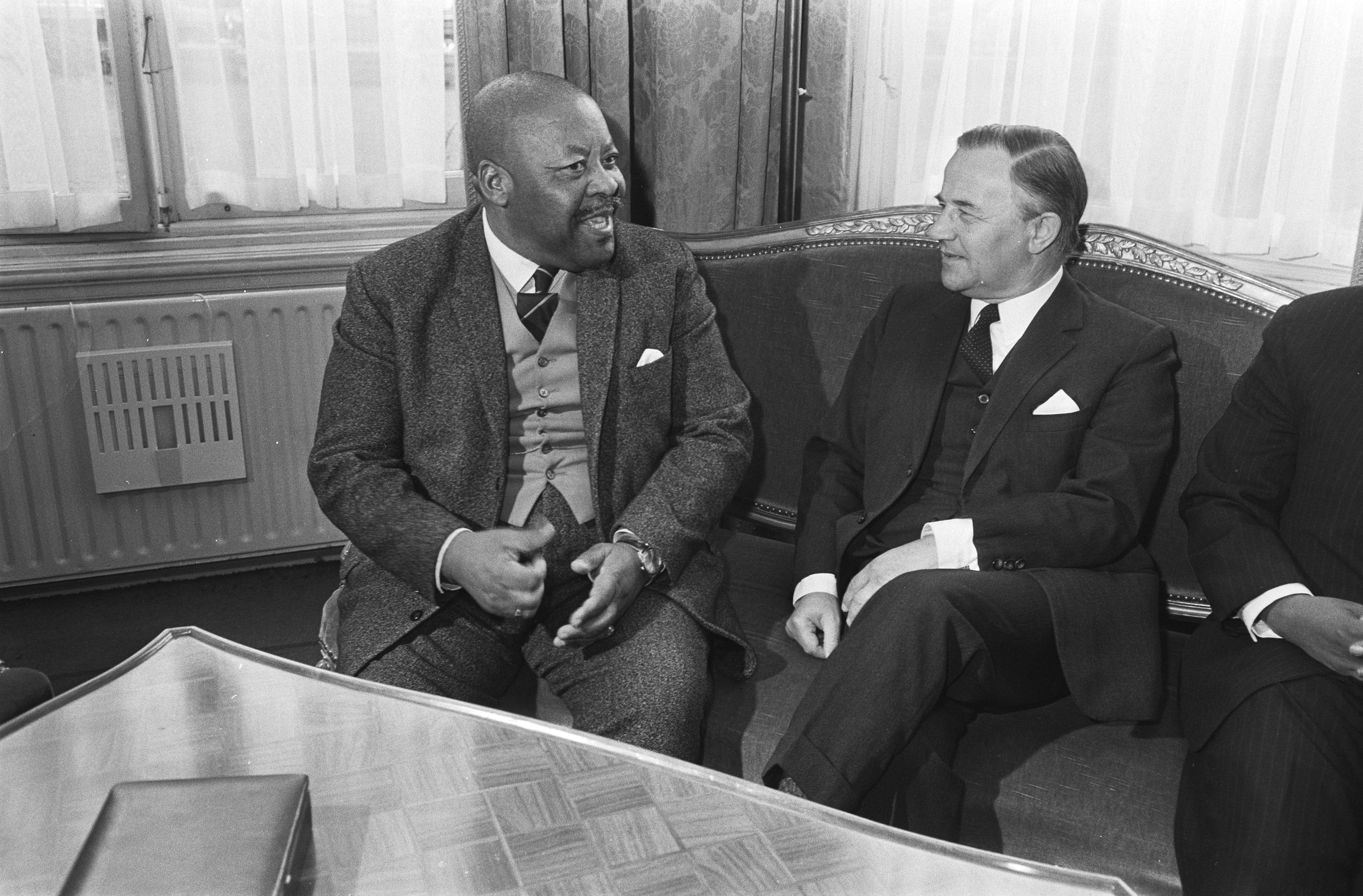
Prime Minister of Lesotho Leabua Jonathan and Prime Minister Piet de Jong during a meeting at the Ministry of General Affairs on 4 November 1970.

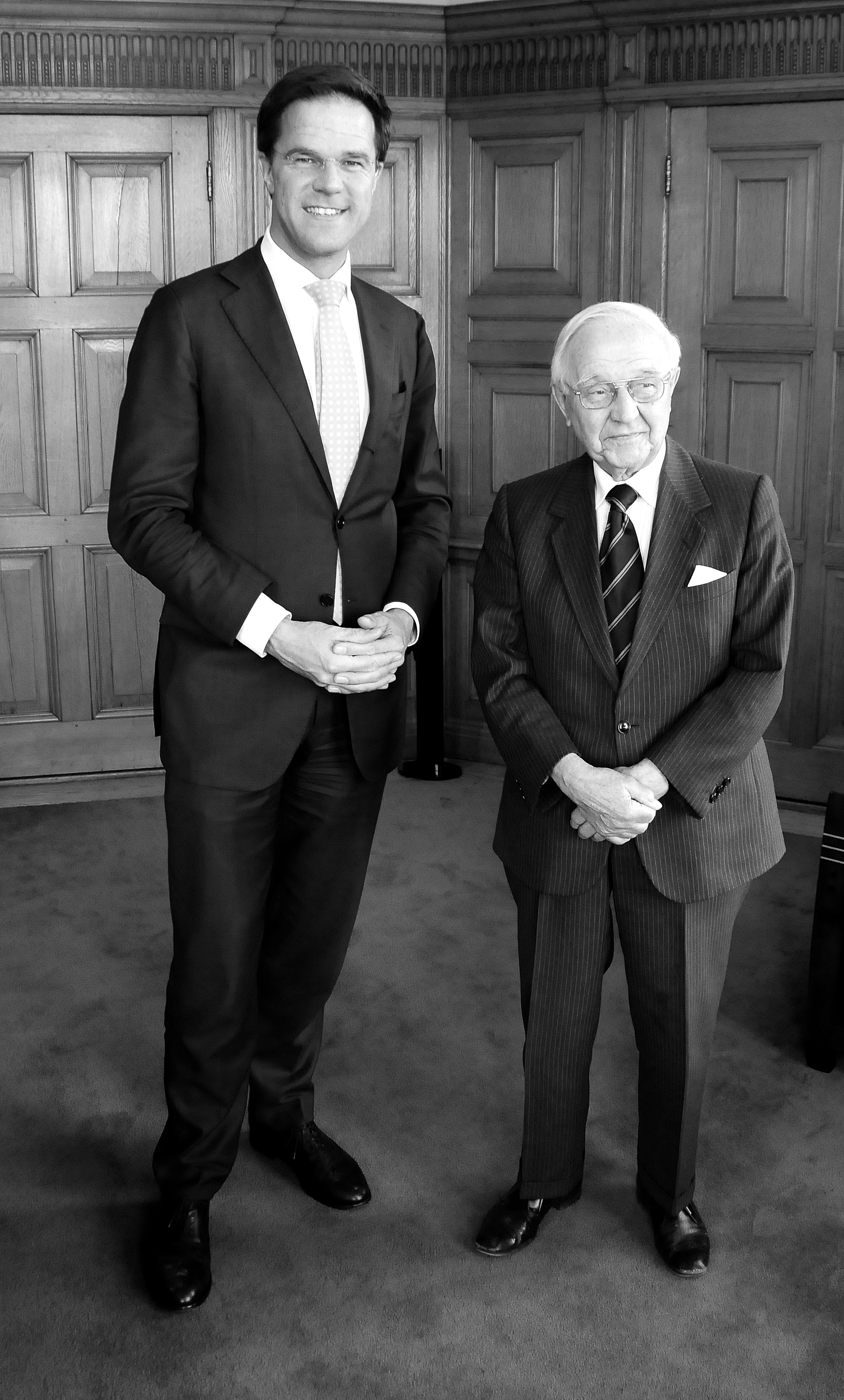
Prime Minister Mark Rutte and Piet de Jong during a meeting in Het Torentje on 7 March 2011.

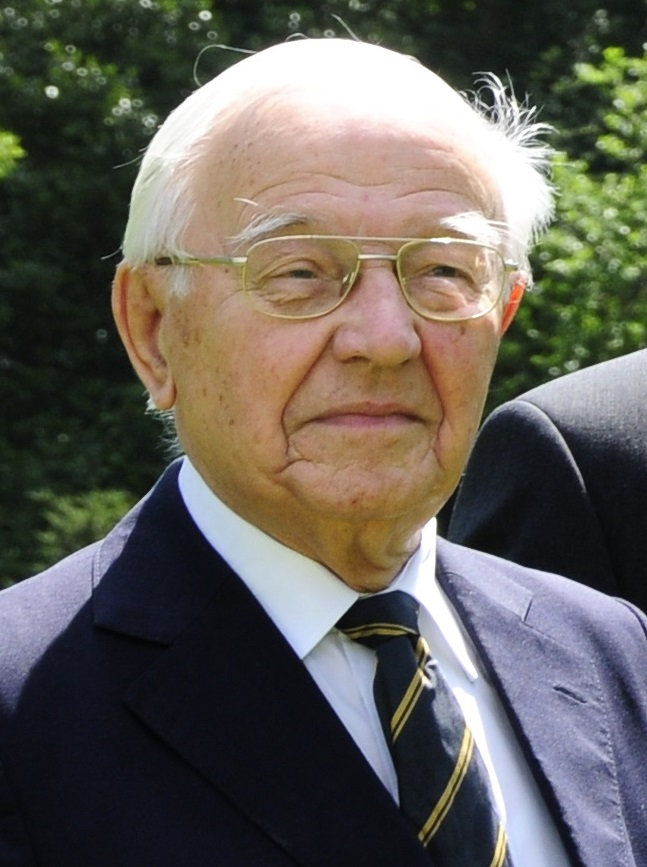
Piet de Jong in The Hague at the age of 96 on 5 July 2011.

== World War II ==
After his graduation in 1934, he served a short time in the Dutch East Indies before he entered service in the Royal Netherlands Navy Submarine Service. On 10 May 1940 Nazi Germany invaded the Netherlands and the government fled to London to escape the German occupation. De Jong, then a Lieutenant junior grade, was giving a battlefield promotion and command of the nearly finished submarine HNLMS O 24 and was ordered to bring the submarine to the HMNB Portsmouth naval base in Portsmouth, England. De Jong successfully navigated the HNLMS O 24 through English Channel and was awarded the Bronze Cross for bravery on 16 July 1940. De Jong served as First Officer on the HNLMS O 24 from July 1940 until October 1944 fighting in the Battle of the Atlantic from July 1940 until July 1942 when the HNLMS O 24 was transferred to the British Eastern Fleet to fight in the Pacific War. On 8 July 1943 De Jong was awarded the Bronze Cross for bravery a second time. On 25 October 1944 De Jong was promoted to lieutenant commander and was appointment as commanding officer of the HNLMS O 24. Under his command the HNLMS O 24 initially continued in the Pacific War. Following the end of World War II De Jong continued to serve in the Royal Netherlands Navy holding several administrative functions. On 14 November 1951 De Jong was appointment as commanding officer of the frigate HNLMS De Zeeuw and on 20 October 1951 De Jong was transferred to the Allied Command Channel at the HMNB Portsmouth naval base in Portsmouth, England as a senior staff officer. In April 1953 De Jong was promoted to commander and in March 1955 De Jong was appointment as chief of staff to the Inspector General of the Navy Lieutenant admiral Prince Bernhard and as chief military adjutant and senior aide-de-camp to Queen Juliana. In October 1958 De Jong was promoted to captain and appointment as commanding officer of the destroyer HNLMS Gelderland.

== Politics ==
=== State Secretary ===
On 7 June 1959, during a NATO naval exercises near Scotland, De Jong received an unexpected telegram with the orders that he was to report the next day to Vice Admiral Leendert Brouwer, the Commander of the Royal Netherlands Navy himself, De Jong was summoned because of his "appointment" as State Secretary for Defence in the new De Quay cabinet. De Jong was airlifted from HNLMS Gelderland by helicopter and transported to the aircraft carrier HNLMS Karel Doorman. It was the second time that De Jong was asked for a political office, for the Dutch general election of 1956 he was approached by Carl Romme the leader of the Catholic People's Party for a seat in the House of Representatives but De Jong respectfully declined his offer, and stated: "I don't have political ambitions, I want to become an admiral".

During that time the independence of the Royal Netherlands Navy in the Armed forces of the Netherlands was in question, the main focus of the discussion was the new command structure for all the service branches. Both a horizontal-structure and vertical-structure had their proponents and opponents, the Royal Netherlands Navy was historically a proponent of a vertical-structure but the horizontal-structure received increasing support, including from the then Minister of War and the Navy Kees Staf. During the cabinet formation for the De Quay cabinet the decision was made to go with the horizontal-structure and the first step was made with the combining of the Ministry of War and the Ministry of the Navy. With the combining of the ministries a serious efficiency problem in the Ministry of War was discovered, while the Ministry of the Navy was thought to be in an excellent administrative condition.

After his meeting with Admiral Brouwer, De Jong reported to the incoming Minister of Defence Sidney J. van den Bergh, who formally asked De Jong to become the new State Secretary for Defence. De Jong was given a few days to think it over and he used that time to speak with Carl Romme. De Jong informed him that he was not a member of the Catholic People's Party but Romme respond by saying: "You are not a member of a different party? No, but you are a Roman Catholic? Then we will we see you as one of us." Romme did advise De Jong to become a member of the Catholic People's Party after six months. On 11 June 1959, De Jong reported back to Van den Bergh and was told about the new horizontal-structure, De Jong who was a proponent of a vertical-structure was left with a few remarks. The next day the meeting was continued in the presence of the incoming Secretary-general for the Ministry of Defence Duyverman who was going to be responsible for all financial and budgetary affairs for the Ministry of Defence. De Jong objected, he thought he could not be politically responsible as the State Secretary for Defence if he was not responsible for all financial affairs for his own department, Van den Bergh became irritated with De Jongs position on the matter and the meeting was adjourned for 16 June 1959.

=== Minister ===
Immediately thereafter, De Jong served as Minister of Defence in the successive Marijnen, Cals and Zijlstra cabinets.

=== Prime minister ===
From 5 April 1967 to 6 July 1971, he was Prime Minister of the Netherlands and minister of general affairs in the De Jong cabinet. His cabinet was the first Cabinet of the Netherlands since World War II that served a full four-year term without crises.

His cabinet was confronted with a demand for democratic reforms in the society and it decided to democratise colleges and universities after the famous Maagdenhuisbezetting. Plans were made to modernise politics by establishing an electoral system with districts or a chosen prime minister, but these plans were not implemented. Meanwhile, a pay pause due to the decision of employers and employees to raise wages was partly revoked after anti-government demonstrations and strikes. The Minister of Economic Affairs Leo de Block resigned, officially as a protest against the wage rise in the metal industry, but another reason was his slow reaction to the inflation and rising prices after the introduction of value added tax. More unrest took shape in demonstrations against the Vietnam War. Internationally, relations with Indonesia improved, resulting in a visit by president Suharto which was, however, overshadowed by the occupation of the Indonesian embassy by Moluccans. The Warsaw Pact invasion of Czechoslovakia was seen as a reason to increase the defence budget. During his term as Prime Minister of the Netherlands De Jong met with numeral state leaders, including US president Richard Nixon, presidents of France Charles de Gaulle and Georges Pompidou. He was present in the hospital when Prince Claus announced the birth of his son Willem-Alexander, Prince of Orange on 27 April 1967.

After serving as Prime Minister of the Netherlands, De Jong became a member of the Senate, where he served from 1971 to 1974 and as the parliamentary leader in the Senate. In 1972, he was passed by the Biesheuvel II cabinet for the position of Vice-president of the Council of State In 1973, he passed the mayoralty of Eindhoven.

== After politics ==
Following the end of his active political career, De Jong occupied many posts in industry and seats on numerous supervisory boards. In December 1990 he was selected to lead a diplomatic mission to Iraq to free Dutch hostages, but ultimately the mission was cancelled.

On 25 March 2010, De Jong, still visibly spirituous and active, gave a speech at Nieuwspoort about the publication of the biography of former Minister of Foreign Affairs and the 5th Secretary General of NATO Joseph Luns. On 24 April 2010 during the annual Christian Democratic Appeal party conference, De Jong spoke about former deputy prime minister and Labour Party party leader Wouter Bos and his actions which led to the fall of the Balkenende IV cabinet.

After the 2010 general election, the Christian Democratic Appeal (CDA) suffered a disappointing election result, and informateur Ivo Opstelten announced the formation of a new centre-right coalition cabinet composed of the winner of the election, the People's Party for Freedom and Democracy (VVD), and De Jong's own CDA, but with the support of the Party for Freedom (PVV) of Geert Wilders. De Jong spoke out against this support and said that the PVV's stand on freedom of religion was a deal-breaker.

On 30 March 2012, De Jong and several other prominent CDA members, including fellow former prime minister Ruud Lubbers, former Ministers of Foreign Affairs Hans van den Broek, Pieter Kooijmans and Ben Bot, former Ministers for Development Cooperation Piet Bukman and Agnes van Ardenne, and former ministers Wim Deetman and Ernst Hirsch Ballin and former State Secretary Karien van Gennip all signed a petition of disapproval of the proposed cuts to the international development budget by the Rutte I cabinet. De Jong responded by announcing that he would leave the CDA if the cuts were implemented. He expressed satisfaction about the fall of the cabinet in 2012, calling it a "lame cabinet".

De Jong was present at the ascension of Willem-Alexander to the Dutch throne on 30 April 2013. He was prime minister at the time of the King's birth. At the age of 98 he was the oldest person attending the ceremony.

On 1 December 2013, De Jong and fellow former prime ministers Dries van Agt and Ruud Lubbers were present at the presentation of the book Polarisatie en hoogconjunctuur, a book about Dutch politics in the 1960s. De Jong received the first copy from incumbent prime minister Mark Rutte.

=== Reputation and legacy ===
During his time as Prime Minister of the Netherlands, he was accused of not showing enough strength and too little action when needed during the social revolution of the 1960s by some of the counterculture of that time. De Jong was frequently labelled as old-fashioned, and that old-fashioned image was reinforced by his bowler hat, which he wore frequently outside, a custom he picked up during his time living in England during World War II. In contrast the "silent majority" were reported to be content with the policies of his cabinet. More than forty years later, De Jong is considered by many to have made well thought-out decisions during his time as prime minister and when needed showed enough strength with a far more progressive ideology than he was credited for at the time.

Politicians from the entire political spectrum have labelled De Jong as one of the better prime ministers of the Netherlands. In an episode of the Dutch television programme Netwerk aired in 2005, he is even labelled as perhaps the best postwar Prime Minister of the Netherlands. This view has been shared by numerous high-profile current and former Dutch politicians, including former prime minister Dries van Agt and former deputy prime minister Hans Wiegel, who praised De Jong being perhaps the best prime minister after World War II. Former Member of the Senate and Righteous Among the Nations Johan van Hulst said that of all the prime ministers he worked with in twenty-five years, De Jong was the best. On 23 March 2011, the history channel Hollanddoc devoted an episode about his life with the quote "Attention for the least-known prime minister after World War II, but perhaps the most successful: Piet de Jong" In November 2011, the second edition of his in 2001 released biography Van buitengaats naar Binnenhof. P.J.S. de Jong (From offshore to Binnenhof. P.J.S. de Jong) became well received and further enhanced his reputation: "He showed himself a team leader with perspective and humor. The ideal manager in a time of crisis of authority, polarization and social unrest."

De Jong said to Queen Juliana, for whom he had served as aide-de-camp, when he was sworn in as State Secretary for Defence, "Majesty, there you see how a person comes down in the world." (Dutch: "Majesteit, zo ziet u maar hoe een mens aan lager wal kan raken.") And in a response to a delicate question of a radio reporter, when asked what his thoughts on pornography were, he said, "As far as I know, pornography is the only working medicine against seasickness." When later a Belgian minister spoke negatively about the libertarian ideas of the Dutch on pornography, he responded, "Well, the Belgians aren't a seafaring people, are they?"

== Personal ==
After World War II, De Jong married former resistance fighter Anna Geertruida Jacoba Henriëtte "Anneke" Bartels (8 January 1915 – 6 January 2010). At the time when they met Bartels was serving in the women's division of the Royal Netherlands Navy. They married on 26 June 1947 and had one daughter and two sons, Maria (born 31 May 1948) Jos (born 31 August 1949) and Gijs (born 15 October 1952). Anneke Bartels died on 6 January 2010 two days before her ninety-fifth birthday after suffering from heart and lung illnesses since 2000. De Jong lived in The Hague since 1959, first in a house on the royal palace Huis ten Bosch estate from 1960 until 1980 and later in a apartment in the neighbourhood of Haagse Bos from 1980 until his death.

=== Longevity ===
At the age of 101 years, 115 days, De Jong was the oldest living and earliest-serving former prime minister of the Netherlands and the oldest living former Member of the Council of Ministers of the Netherlands overall. De Jong was the second oldest Prime Minister of the Netherlands by age after Willem Drees who lived to 101 years, 314 days.

== Death ==
Piet de Jong died on 27 July 2016 at his home in The Hague at the age of 101. Having survived his wife by six years, De Jong was survived by his three children, eight grandchildren and fifteen great-grandchildren.

== Military ranks ==
Promotions
Rank	Date
Midshipman (Adjudant-onderofficier)	1931
Ensign (Luitenant ter zee 3e klasse)	1934
Lieutenant junior grade (Luitenant ter zee der 2de klasse)	1936
Lieutenant commander (Luitenant ter zee der 1ste klasse)	1944
Commander (Kapitein-luitenant ter zee)	1953
Captain (Kapitein-ter-zee)	1958

== Decorations ==
Military decorations
Ribbon bar	Decoration	Country	Date	Comment
	Bronze Cross (2)	Netherlands	16 July 1940 / 8 July 1943	
	War Memorial Cross	Netherlands		
	Medal for Order and Peace	Netherlands		
	Distinguished Service Cross	United Kingdom		
	Commander of the Order of the Sword	Sweden		
	Order of Naval Merit	Argentina		
	United Nations Korea Medal	United Nations		

Honours
Ribbon bar	Honour	Country	Date	Comment
	Grand Officer of the Order of the House of Orange	Netherlands	1958	
	Knight Grand Cross of the Order of Orange-Nassau	Netherlands	17 July 1971	
	Grand Cross of the Order of Leopold II	Belgium		
	Grand Cross of the Order of Bernardo O'Higgins	Chile		
	Honorary Lieutenant of the Royal Victorian Order	United Kingdom		
	Officer of the Order of the Star of Africa	Liberia		
	Grand Decoration of Honour in Silver of the Decoration of Honour for Services to the Republic	Austria		

== Bibliography ==
- Brouwer, Jan Willem; van Merriënboer, Johan (2001). Van buitengaats naar Binnenhof: P.J.S. de Jong, een biografie. Netherlands: Sdu Uitgevers. ISBN 978-90-12-08774-2.

Party political offices
Preceded by Jan Niers	Parliamentary leader of the Catholic People's Party in the Senate; 1971–1974	Succeeded by Jan Teijssen
Political offices
Preceded by Harry Moorman	State Secretary for Defence; 1959–1963; Served alongside: Michael Calmeyer	Succeeded by Joop Haex
Preceded by Harry Moorman	State Secretary for Defence; 1959–1963; Served alongside: Michael Calmeyer	Succeeded by Adri van Es
Preceded by Harry Moorman	State Secretary for Defence; 1959–1963; Served alongside: Michael Calmeyer	Succeeded by Willem den Toom
Preceded by Sim Visser	Minister of Defence; 1963–1967	Succeeded by Willem den Toom
Preceded by Jelle Zijlstra	Minister of General Affairs; 1967–1971	Succeeded by Barend Biesheuvel
Preceded by Jelle Zijlstra	Prime Minister of the Netherlands; 1967–1971	Succeeded by Barend Biesheuvel
Military offices
Preceded by Wopke Johan de Vries	Commanding officer of HNLMS O 24; 1944–1946	Succeeded by Jean Charles; Klaas Leeksma
Unknown	Commanding officer of HNLMS De Zeeuw; 1952–1952	Unknown
Unknown	Commanding officer of HNLMS Gelderland; 1958–1959	Unknown
