= Adri van Es =

Dutch admiral

His Excellency Adri van Es
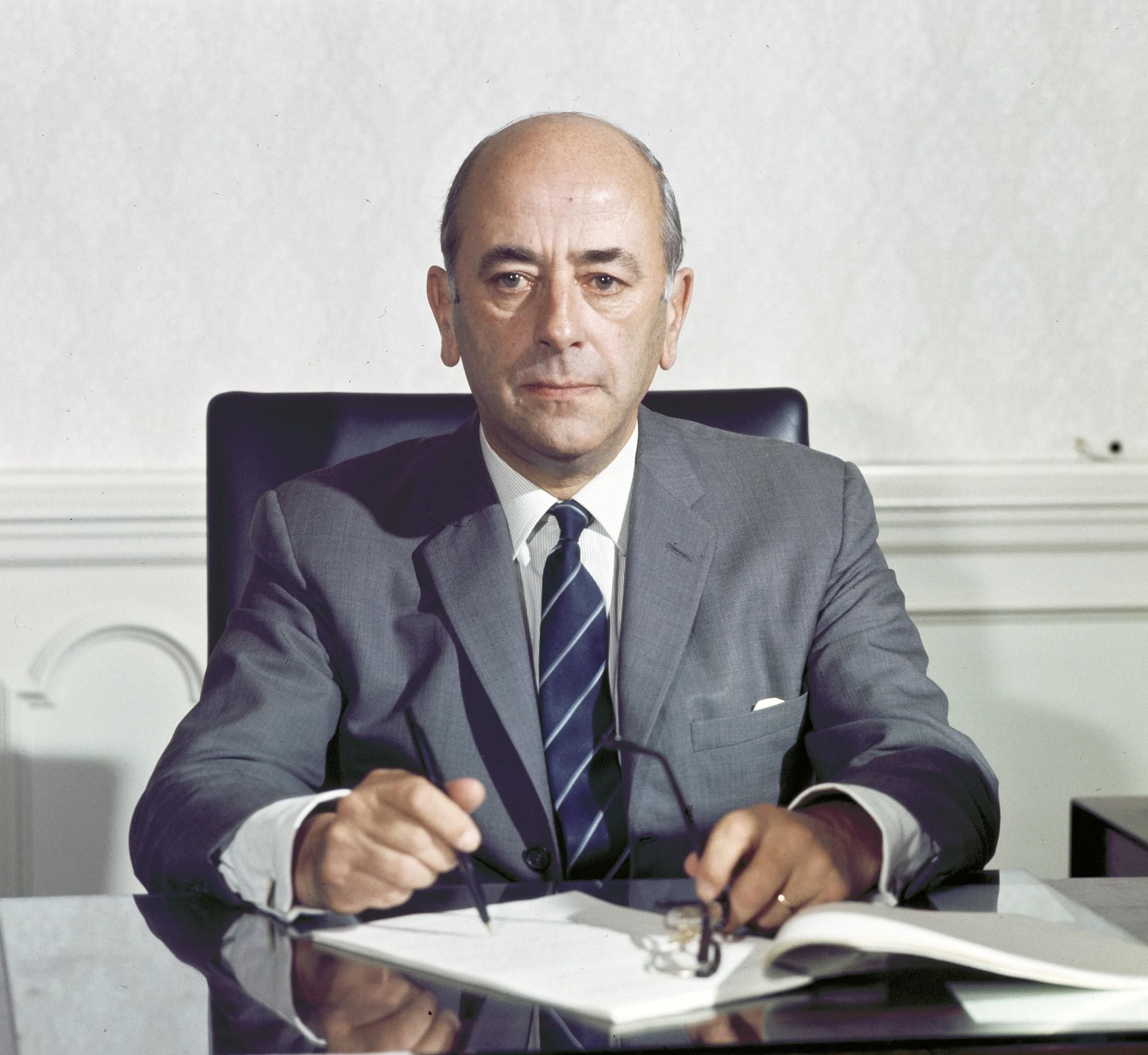
- Adri van Es in 1966

State Secretary for Defence
- In office 14 August 1963 – 16 September 1972 Serving with See list: Joop Haex (1963–1965) Willem den Toom (1963–1965) Gerard Peijnenburg (1965–1967) Jan Borghouts (1965–1966) Heije Schaper (1966–1967) Joop Haex (1967–1971) Bob Duynstee (1967–1971)
- Prime Minister: See list: Victor Marijnen (1963–1965) Jo Cals (1965–1966) Jelle Zijlstra (1966–1967) Piet de Jong (1967–1971) Barend Biesheuvel (1971–1972)
- Preceded by: Piet de Jong
- Succeeded by: Joep Mommersteeg; Bram Stemerdink

Personal details
- Born: Adrianus van Es; 28 April 1913 Amersfoort, Netherlands
- Died: 6 January 1994 (aged 80) Wassenaar, Netherlands
- Party: Christian Democratic Appeal (from 1980)
- Other political affiliations: Anti-Revolutionary Party (1959–1980)
- Spouse: Anthonia van Es (m. 1937)
- Children: 2 children
- Education: Royal Naval College
- Occupation: Naval Officer

Military service
- Allegiance: Netherlands
- Branch/service: Royal Netherlands Navy
- Years of service: 1931–1963 (Active duty); 1963–1966 (Reserve)
- Rank: Vice admiral
- Unit: 320 Dutch Squadron RAF
- Commands: HNLMS Karel Doorman (1959–1963)
- Battles/wars: World War II; Battle of the Netherlands; Battle of France

Adrianus "Adri" van Es (28 April 1913 – 6 January 1994) was a Dutch naval officer and vice admiral of the Royal Netherlands Navy.

== Decorations ==
Honours
Ribbon bar	Honour	Country	Date	Comment
	Officer of the Order of Orange-Nassau	Netherlands	6 July 1971	
	Commander of the Order of the Netherlands Lion	Netherlands	10 December 1972	

Political offices
Preceded by Piet de Jong	State Secretary for Defence; 1963–1972; Served alongside: Joop Haex (1963–1965); Willem den Toom (1963–1965); Gerard Peijnenburg (1965–1967); Jan Borghouts (1965–1966); Heije Schaper (1966–1967); Joop Haex (1967–1971); Bob Duynstee (1967–1971)	Succeeded by Joep Mommersteeg
Preceded by Piet de Jong	State Secretary for Defence; 1963–1972; Served alongside: Joop Haex (1963–1965); Willem den Toom (1963–1965); Gerard Peijnenburg (1965–1967); Jan Borghouts (1965–1966); Heije Schaper (1966–1967); Joop Haex (1967–1971); Bob Duynstee (1967–1971)	Succeeded by Bram Stemerdink
