= Night of Schmelzer =

Debate in the House of Representatives in the Netherlands

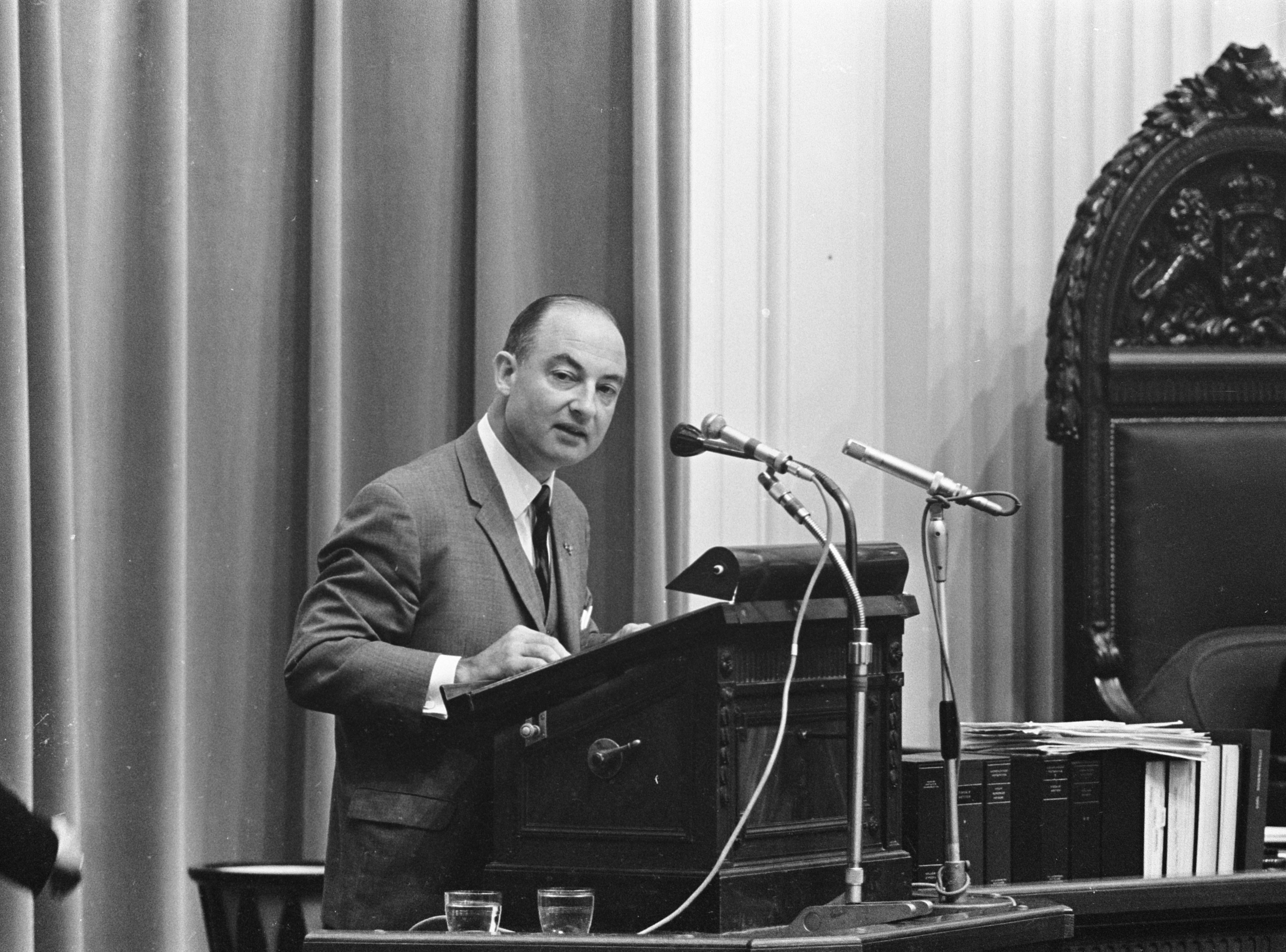
KVP leader Norbert Schmelzer speaking on 11 October 1966.

The Night of Schmelzer was a debate in the House of Representatives of the Netherlands that took place from 13 October to the early hours of 14 October 1966. This night marked the final day of the general debate on the 1967 budget, which had begun on 11 October. During the debate's conclusion, Norbert Schmelzer, parliamentary group leader of the Catholic People's Party (KVP), introduced a motion opposing the Cals cabinet. This cabinet included members from the KVP, the Labour Party (PvdA), and the Anti-Revolutionary Party (ARP). Although the cabinet perceived the motion as a vote of no confidence, it passed nonetheless. Consequently, the cabinet resigned on 15 October.

The Night of Schmelzer catalyzed ongoing developments in Dutch politics. Within the Labour Party, distrust of the KVP deepened, spurring a polarisation strategy and the rise of the New Left faction. This event also accelerated the KVP's electoral decline, already underway due to depillarisation. Christian radicals favoring cooperation with the PvdA split from the KVP in 1968 to establish the Political Party of Radicals. Conversely, the Night propelled the KVP, CHU, and ARP toward unification as the Christian Democratic Appeal (CDA). Meanwhile, anti-establishment parties like the Farmers' Party and the newly-founded Democrats 66, established on 14 October 1966, gained momentum, reflected in their increased popularity in the 1967 general election.

== Background ==
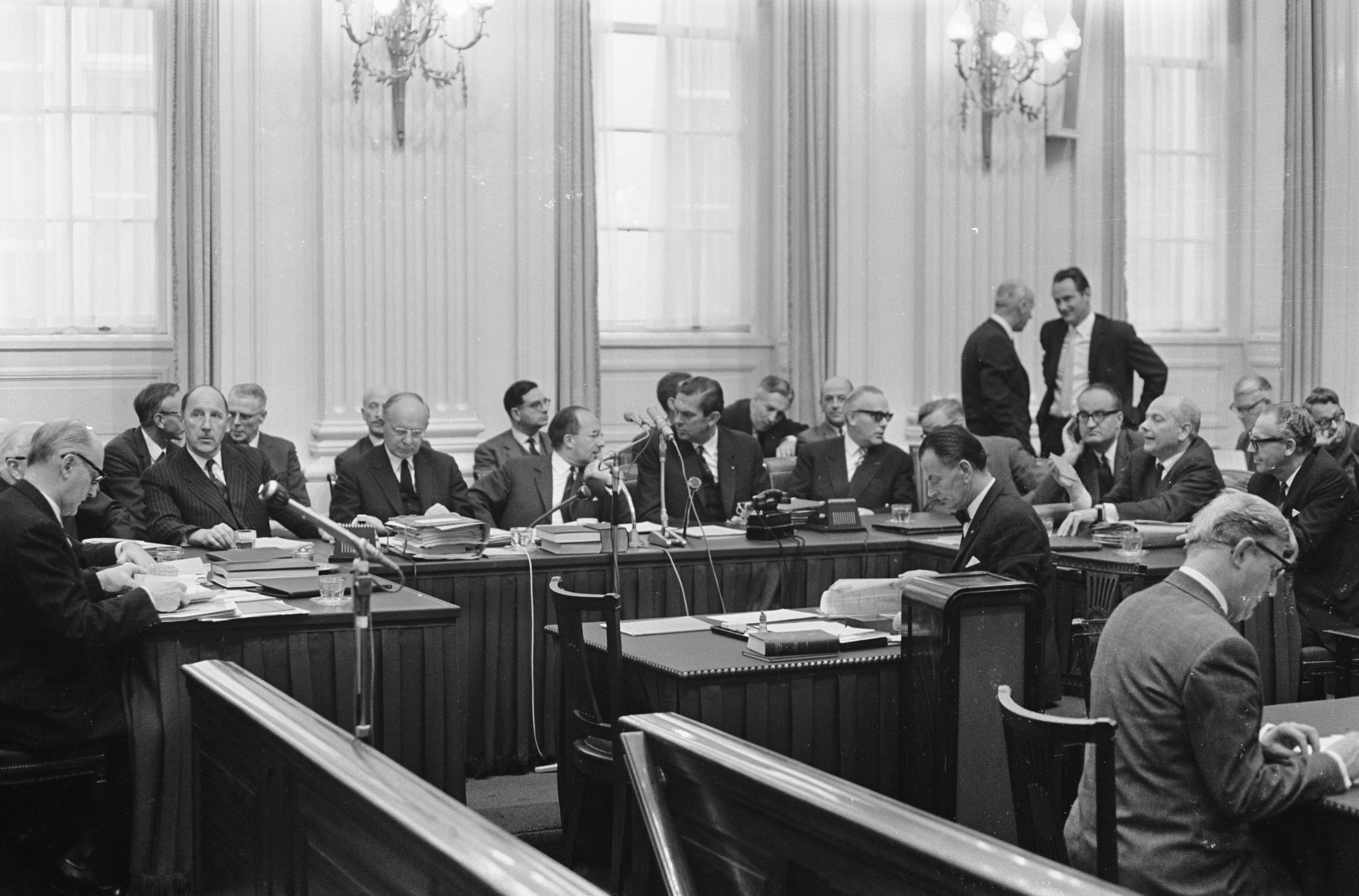
Government table during the debate on 13 October 1966.

After the 1963 general election, the Marijnen cabinet, comprising the KVP, VVD, CHU, and ARP, took office. This cabinet fell in early 1965 after a cabinet crisis over the broadcasting system, in which the KVP and ARP opposed the VVD. KVP faction leader and informateur Norbert Schmelzer's attempts to resolve the issues during the formation that year were unsuccessful. MP and formateur Jo Cals, representing the KVP's left wing, successfully formed the Cals cabinet, including the KVP, PvdA, and ARP.

The cabinet garnered little enthusiasm. Within the KVP, most preferred a coalition with the VVD, while a small faction, including Cals, favored Roman/Red cooperation. Personal rivalry between Cals and Schmelzer added to tensions within the party. The ARP also faced internal division between traditionalists and radical evangelicals, marked by rivalry between party leader Bauke Roolvink and Deputy Prime Minister Barend Biesheuvel. PvdA supporters were skeptical of the 1965 partner swap, fearing the KVP aimed to resolve the broadcasting issue before resuming a coalition with the VVD.

The cabinet took office during an unfavorable economic period marked by a wage-price spiral and government overspending since 1964. During the formation, the PvdA insisted on deviating from the Romme norm, which restricted government expenditure growth to the rate of national income, much to the dismay of right-wing KVP members. This deviation was immediately applied to the 1966 national budget. The KVP and ARP were frustrated with the inflexibility of Finance Minister Anne Vondeling (PvdA) and Cals. Schmelzer had to threaten resignation to prevent his parliamentary group from opposing the budget.

In the March 1966 provincial elections and the June 1966 municipal council elections, the government parties, particularly the PvdA, suffered losses. Despite this, the three parties remained committed to participating in the government but adopted a more critical stance in anticipation of the February 1967 general election. None of the parties ruled out the possibility of a cabinet crisis.

=== National budget 1967 ===
The immediate issue was the 1967 national budget. The cabinet proposed addressing budget gaps by accelerating income tax collection. During deliberations, Finance Minister Vondeling claimed that after implementing all measures, the budget deficit was only 26 million guilders, within the margin of error, so further action was unnecessary. However, the KVP parliamentary group believed the deficit was significantly larger.

== Debate ==
=== 11 and 12 October ===
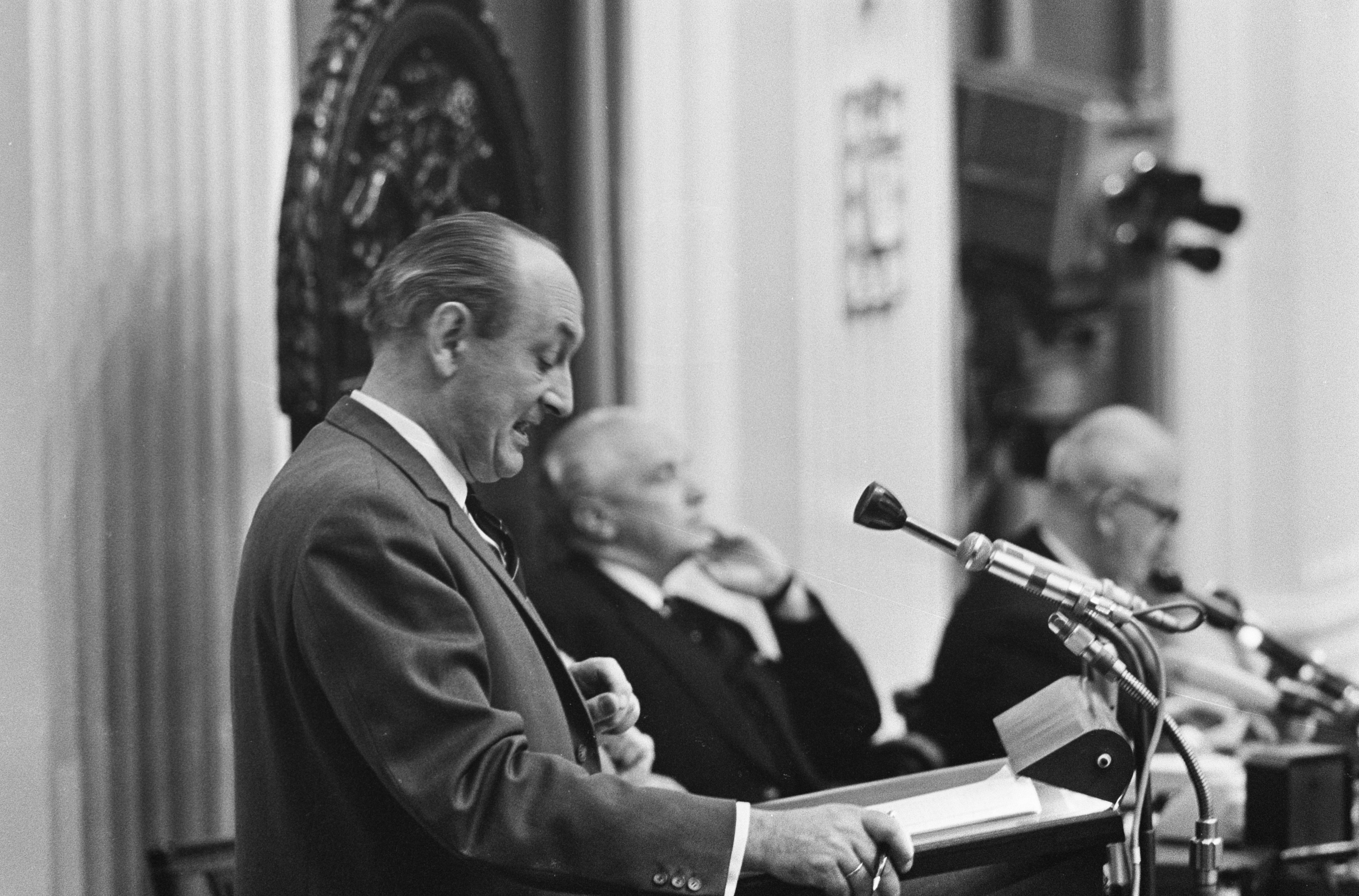
VVD parliamentary group leader Edzo Toxopeus speaking during the general debate on 11 October 1966.

On 11 and 12 October 1966, the general political debate began. Edzo Toxopeus and Henk Beernink, leaders of the VVD and CHU respectively, criticized the cabinet's financial policy and argued that the cabinet should resign. PvdA party leader Gerard Nederhorst predicted an improvement in economic circumstances based on the budget, but the party still had a number of questions. Roolvink was critical of the financial policy on behalf of the ARP, but did not want to express an opinion yet.

Schmelzer started his term with a positive yet critical reflection but concluded with sharp criticism of the national budget. He argued that the cabinet's forecast was overly optimistic and lacked sufficient coverage. He offered several austerity suggestions and expressed willingness to collaborate on additional measures. Schmelzer emphasized that the cabinet needed to regain trust by providing "clear and convincing answers to our pressing questions."

=== 13 and 14 October ===
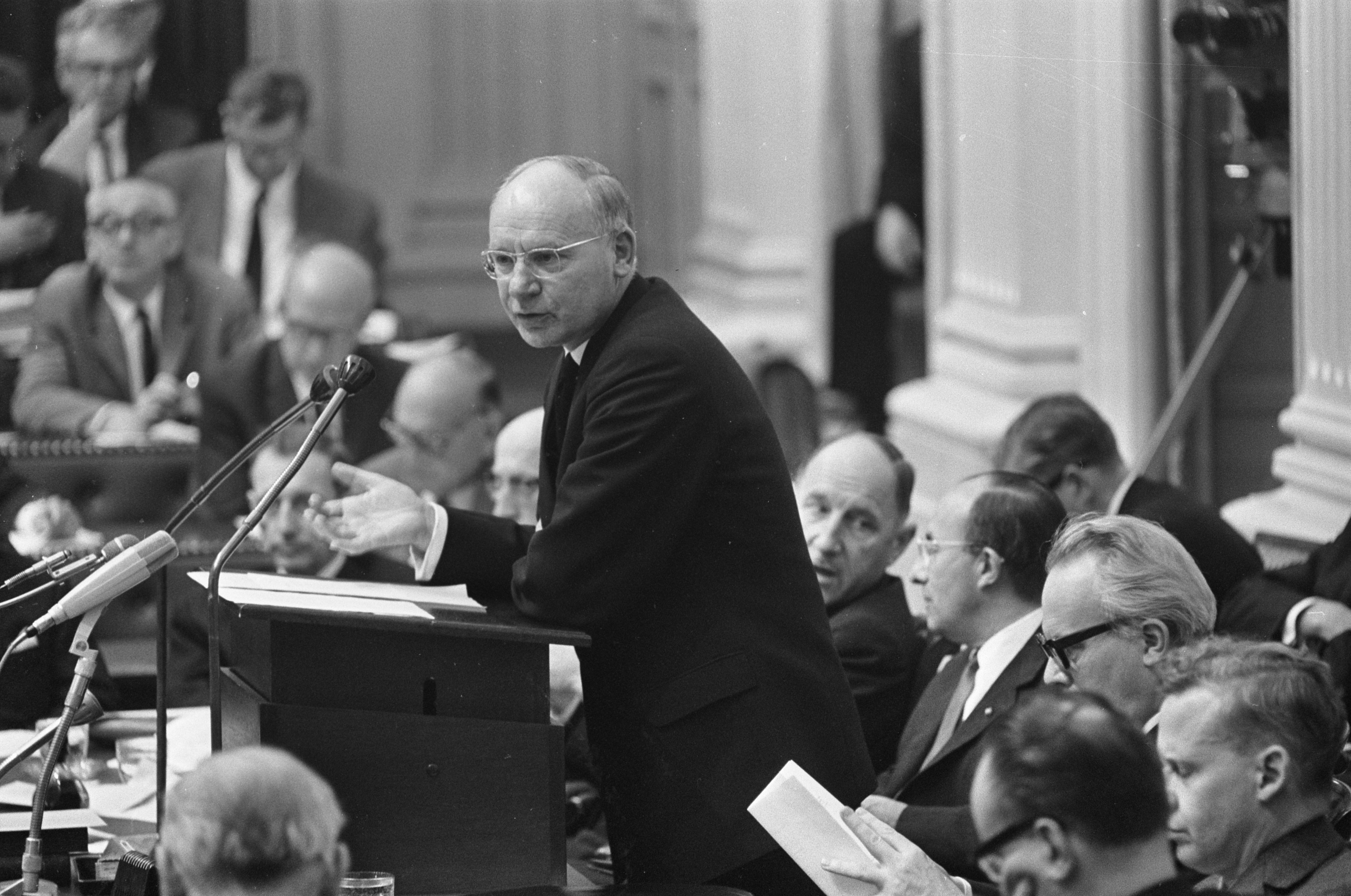
Minister of Finance Anne Vondeling speaking during Night of Schmelzer.

From eleven o'clock in the morning on 13 October, mainly Cals and Vondeling responded on behalf of the cabinet. Both stated that the cabinet had been cautious and that the budget was better than in previous years. Cals indicated that the debate should show whether the cabinet enjoyed sufficient confidence from the House.

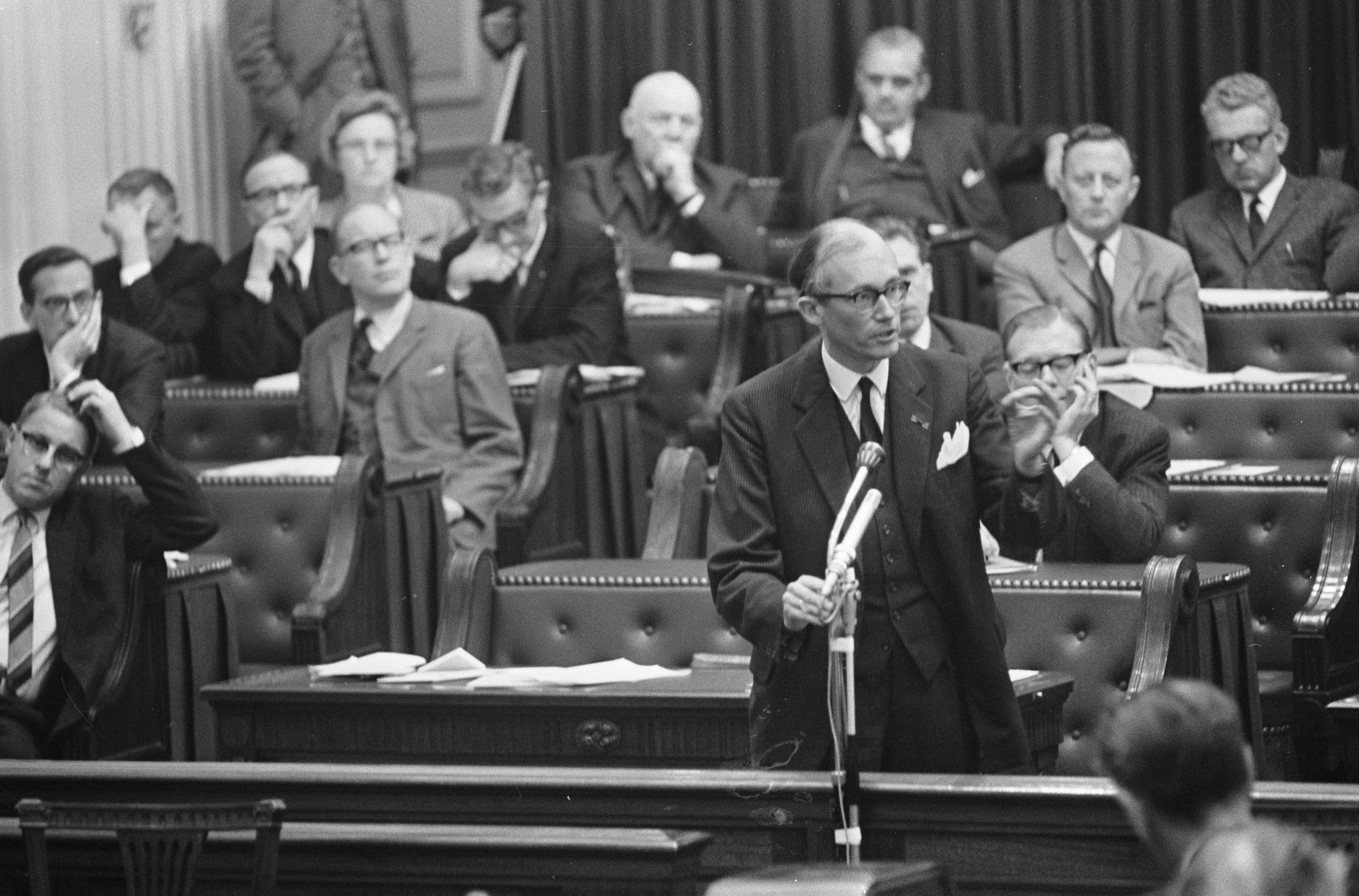
Johan Witteveen, financial specialist within the VVD parliamentary group, interrupts Minister of Finance Anne Vondeling during the debate on 13 October 1966.

After a break from a quarter past four to eight o'clock in the evening, the floor was again given to the House. After the cabinet's response, the VVD was not convinced that the budget contributed to restoring equilibrium. Toxopeus, Witteveen and three fellow parliamentary group members submitted a motion stating that "the expenditure and tax policy must be revised in such a way that these objections are removed". Beernink also maintained his objections to the cabinet.

Schmelzer indicated that he had not yet received an adequate answer to the central question "to what extent this national budget with its consequences for 1968 and subsequent years adequately addresses our current problems". He posed three "urgent" questions to which the cabinet "had to provide confidence-inspiring answers". These were "the correctness of the proposed level of expenditure", "that heavy new burdens are not unavoidable with great probability for 1968" and concrete measures that contributed to responsible wage development.

The PvdA was satisfied with the cabinet's answers, although they acknowledged that the cabinet had not succeeded in all ambitions. Nederhorst asked the KVP and ARP to make their coalition preference clear before the elections, something that neither party responded to. The ARP's concerns that the coverage gap would be too large in 1968 had also not been allayed.

Shortly before midnight, the second term of the Chamber ended. Vondeling and Cals responded an hour later. Cals interpreted Toxopeus' motion as a motion of no confidence. Vondeling and Cals responded to the questions and Cals hoped to have provided "sufficient clarity" to the questions of his parliamentary group.

==== Motion-Schmelzer ====
The House,
Having heard the General Political and Financial Debate on the 1967 National Budget
of the opinion that the proposed financial and economic policy should provide more guarantees for balanced growth and against further currency devaluation and unemployment,
expresses its conviction that, also in view of the possibilities for 1968, in addition to an improvement in the 1967 coverage, measures to prevent additional increases in expenditure are necessary,
invites the Government to submit proposals to this end,
And proceeds to the order of the day.

— The motion-Schmelzer

The meeting was suspended for an hour at around a quarter past two at night at Schmelzer's request for consultation within the parliamentary groups. During the parliamentary group consultation, the vast majority of the KVP parliamentary group appeared to support the Toxopeus motion. Because Schmelzer feared the break-up of the KVP, he decided to submit his own motion. Several ministers knew about it, including ARP ministers. However, KVP MP Marga Klompé was kept in the dark about it. She expressed surprise and demanded consultation with Cals, a request that was voted down. Minister Joseph Luns visited the KVP parliamentary group and requested that it not come to a crisis.

After the parliamentary group meeting, Schmelzer informed Cals about the motion. They both realized that the motion was unacceptable to the cabinet. "Well Norbert, that's it," Cals is said to have said, according to Schmelzer. "I'm afraid so too", Schmelzer replied.

At five past three in the morning, Schmelzer was the first to speak in the third term. He indicated that his parliamentary group had not received a trustworthy answer to two questions, which is why he submitted his motion. He emphasized that it was not a motion of no confidence and that he did not want another coalition. He indicated that the motion would be supported by the vast majority of his parliamentary group. The meeting was then suspended until four o'clock at Cals' request. During the suspension, the ministers came to the conclusion that the motion was unacceptable and that the cabinet would resign if adopted.

==== Vote ====
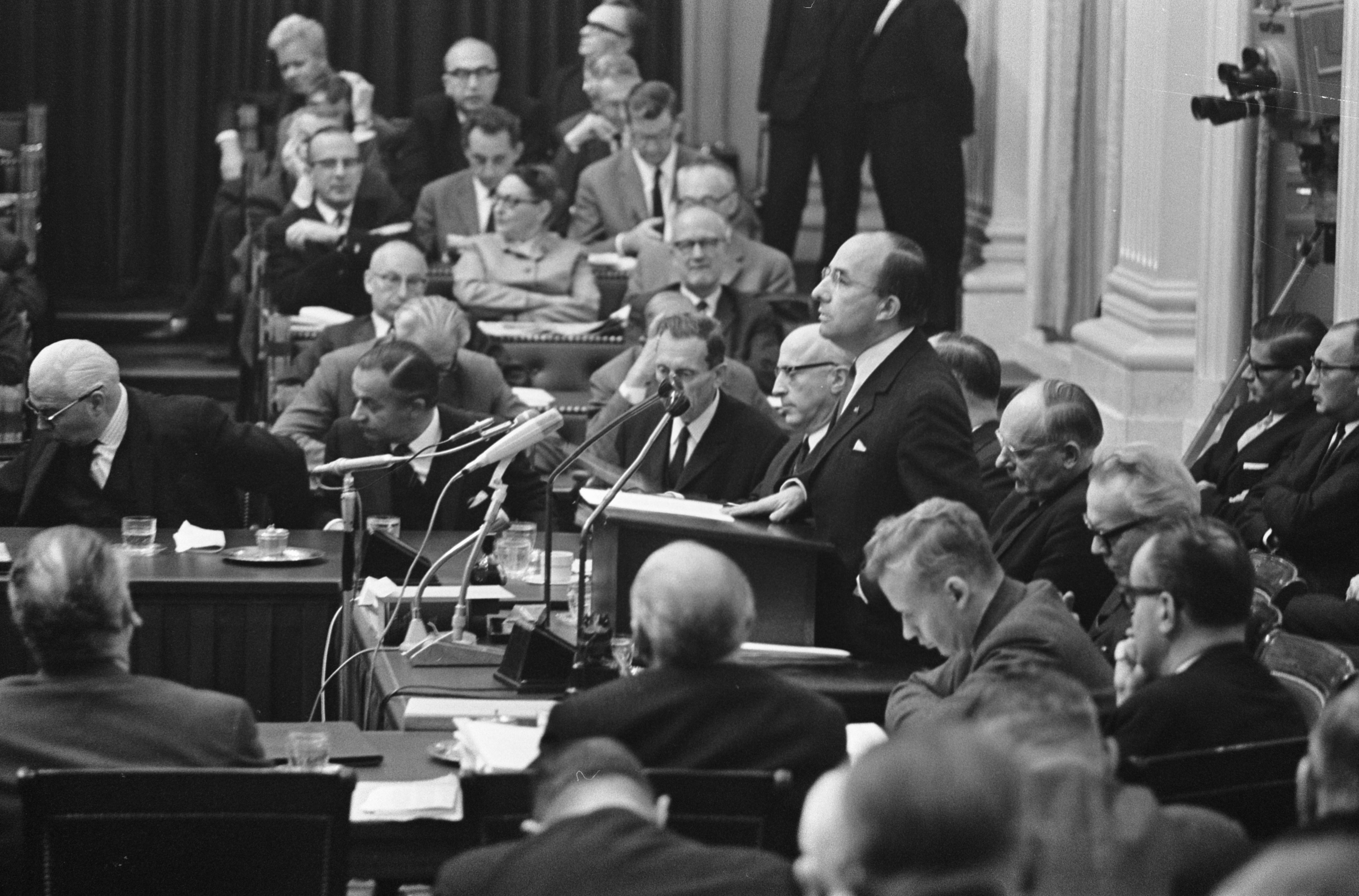
Prime Minister Jo Cals speaking at the general debate in the House of Representatives on 13 October 1966.

The meeting resumed at ten past four. Cals stated that if the House of Representatives adopted the motion, it would lead to a cabinet crisis. He also disagreed with Schmelzer's explanation, which he considered to be in conflict with the content of the motion, and indicated that he considered it to be a lack of confidence in the government's financial and economic policy. His cabinet considered a tax increase unnecessary, and Cals therefore did not wish to cooperate. The motion was put to the vote at around half past four.

VVD, CHU, Political Reformed Party (SGP), Farmers' Party and Reformed Political League (GPV) supported the motion. ARP parliamentary group leader Roolvink had wanted to support the motion, but under pressure from MP Jaap Boersma, chairman Wiert Berghuis and Deputy Prime Minister Biesheuvel, he decided to close ranks and vote against the motion. On the left, the PvdA, Communist Party of the Netherlands (CPN) and Pacifist Socialist Party (PSP) voted against the motion. For the KVP, Annie Kessel, Tom Verdijk, Harry van Doorn and Dick Laan voted against, and the other 39 MPs present voted in favor. The dissenters stated in their explanation of vote that they voted against because the cabinet had indicated that it would offer its resignation if the motion were adopted, and explicitly expressed their support for government policy. The motion was adopted with 75 votes in favour and 62 votes against. (Note: Former KVP chairman Jan Andriessen, ARP member Thieleman Versteeg and KVP member Leo Albering had left the meeting prematurely for personal reasons and did not vote. Former KVP parliamentary group leader Wim de Kort had previously announced that he would be leaving the House on 14 October. The speaker allowed him to participate in the debate and vote after midnight.)

After the vote, Cals requested a suspension of the debate, which ended at twenty to five in the morning. At about six o'clock Cals left the House building. He received spontaneous applause from bystanders, to which he responded "It comes too late - only when you leave".

== Aftermath ==
The Cals cabinet offered its resignation to Queen Juliana on 15 October. The direct result of the Schmelzer's Night was that after a formation the Zijlstra cabinet took office. It was a rump cabinet of the KVP and ARP led by Jelle Zijlstra.

In the 1967 general election, both the KVP (eight seats) and the PvdA (six seats) lost.

The Night of Schmelzer had a catalytic effect on the long-standing growing distrust between the PvdA and the religious parties, in particular the KVP. For the PvdA, the crisis contributed to the unity within the party. The party's renewal movement, New Left, founded in 1966, gained momentum as a result of the crisis. The party implemented the polarisation strategy to emphasize the differences between the PvdA and the religious parties. In 1969, the party congress adopted an "anti-KVP motion" stating that no coalition should be formed with the KVP.

The Night of Schmelzer also had a catalytic effect on the electoral decline of the KVP. Just as in the parliamentary group, there were members within the party who saw more in cooperation with the PvdA. In February 1968, a number of Christian radicals from the KVP left the party and soon after founded the Political Party Radicals (PPR) with radicals from the ARP. On the other hand, the Night contributed to the founding of the Group of Eighteen, with representatives from the KVP, ARP and CHU, which eventually led to the merger of the parties into the Christian Democratic Appeal (CDA) in 1980.

== Sources ==
- Van der Heiden, Peter; Van Kessel, Alexander (2010). Rondom de Nacht van Schmelzer: De kabinetten-Marijnen, -Cals en -Zijlstra 1963-1967 [Around the Night of Schmelzer: The Marijnen, Cals, and Zijlstra cabinets 1963-1967]. Parlementaire geschiedenis van Nederland na 1945 (in Dutch). Boom. hdl:2066/86577. ISBN 978-94-6105-362-6.
