= 1966 Dutch cabinet formation =

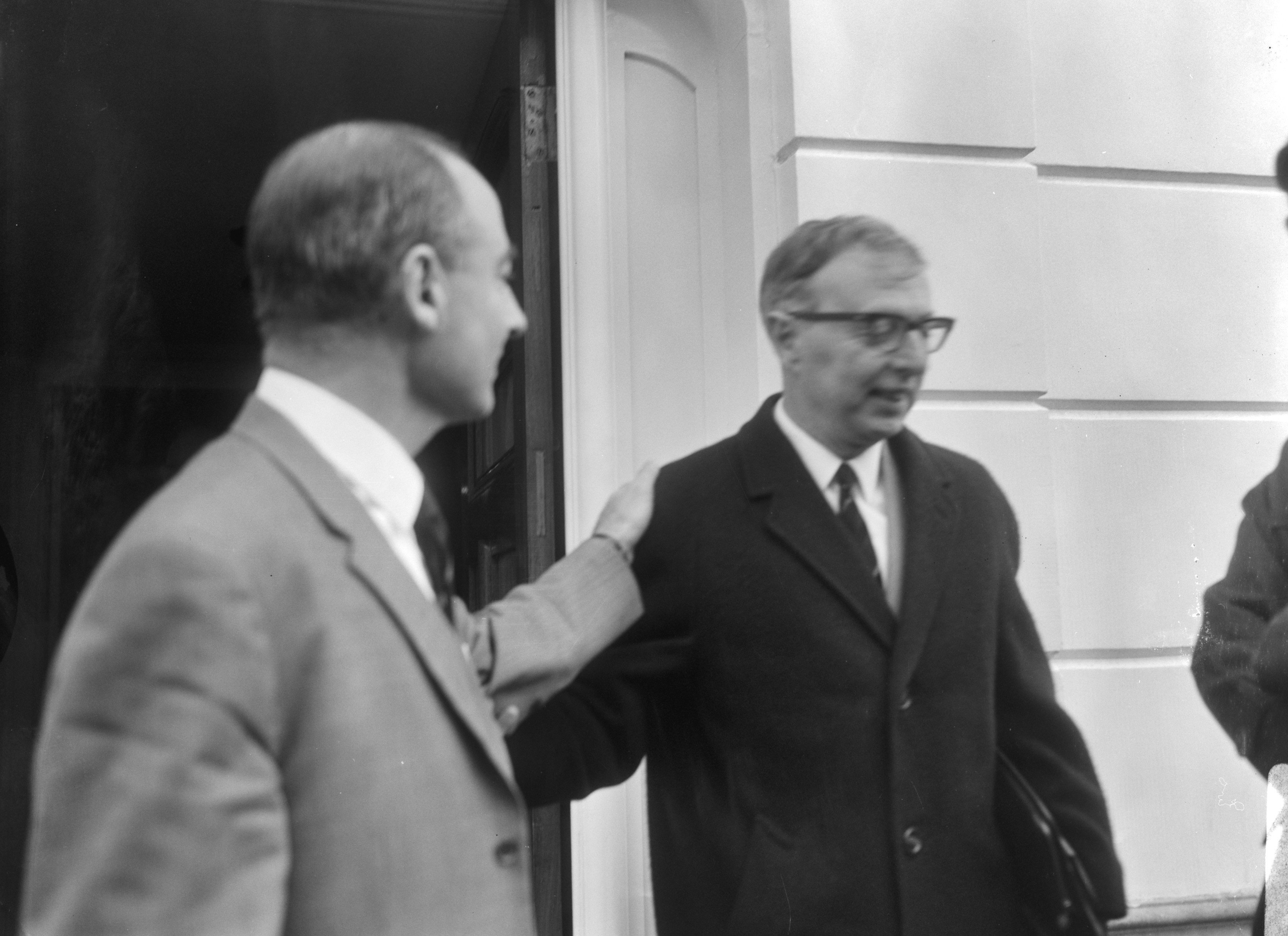
On 24 October, formateur Norbert Schmelzer (left) met with Jelle Zijlstra, who would later become formateur and prime minister

After the fall of the Cals cabinet on 15 October 1966, following the Night of Schmelzer, a cabinet formation took place in Netherlands. On 22 November, this resulted in the Zijlstra cabinet. The minority cabinet was formed by Catholic People's Party (KVP) and the Anti-Revolutionary Party (ARP). It was a rump cabinet of the Cals cabinet, but without the Labour Party (PvdA).

== Background ==
During the 1965 cabinet formation, the Cals cabinet was formed comprising the Catholic People's Party (KVP), Labour Party (PvdA) and the Anti-Revolutionary Party (ARP). During the debate on the 1967 budget from 12 to 14 October, later named the Night of Schmelzer, KVP parliamentary leader Norbert Schmelzer submitted a motion that was critical of the budget presented by minister of Finance Anne Vondeling (PvdA). The motion was supported by the majority of the KVP parliamentary group, the People's Party for Freedom and Democracy (VVD), Christian Historical Union (CHU) and three small parties on the right, and received a majority. Cals had already signalled that adoption of the motion would be seen as a motion of no confidence, and the cabinet resigned on 15 October.

== Formateur Schmelzer ==
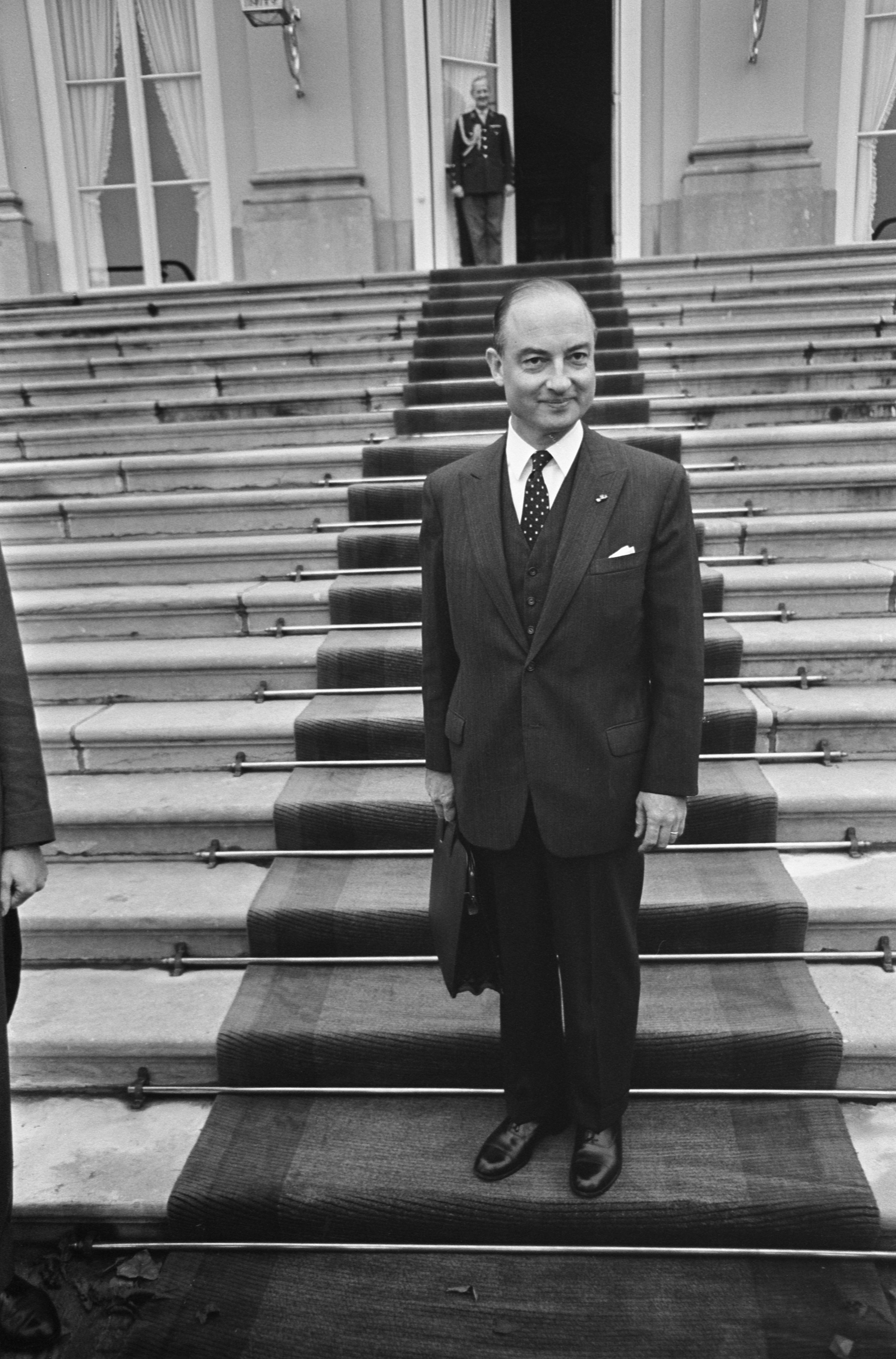
Parliamentary leader Norbert Schmelzer arriving at palace Huis ten Bosch for the consultations of the queen

On 18 October, queen Juliana appointed Schmelzer formateur with the task of forming a cabinet. The same day, Cals informed Schmelzer that his cabinet would not call for new elections, because it did not experience sufficient confidence for this important decision. Reconstruction of the cabinet was unlikely, because it would require either the execution of the motion by the Cals cabinet or the renouncing of the motion by the KVP. The PvdA publicly stated that they wanted to continue with the Cals cabinet, but behind closed doors their goal was to divide the KVP and achieve their long-desired breakthrough with Catholic workers. Other options, would be a cabinet of KVP and ARP with either CHU or VVD. Schmelzer wanted to avoid the latter, to avoid getting ahead of the next elections.

=== Search for a prime minister ===
An important task for Schmelzer was to find a prime minister. Cals was only available for a cabinet with the same parties and nearly the same personnel. Schmelzer either could not or did not want to do it himself. Former KVP prime minister Louis Beel agreed and provided several arguments: the need for continuity in the parliamentary group, avoiding a clear political figure to lead an interim cabinet, avoiding the impression that the crisis was orchestrated to become prime minister, and personal circumstances. The latter referred to his handicapped children and the fact that his wife was cheating on him. Schmelzer asked former KVP minister Jan van den Brink, but he was only available in case of a "national emergency".

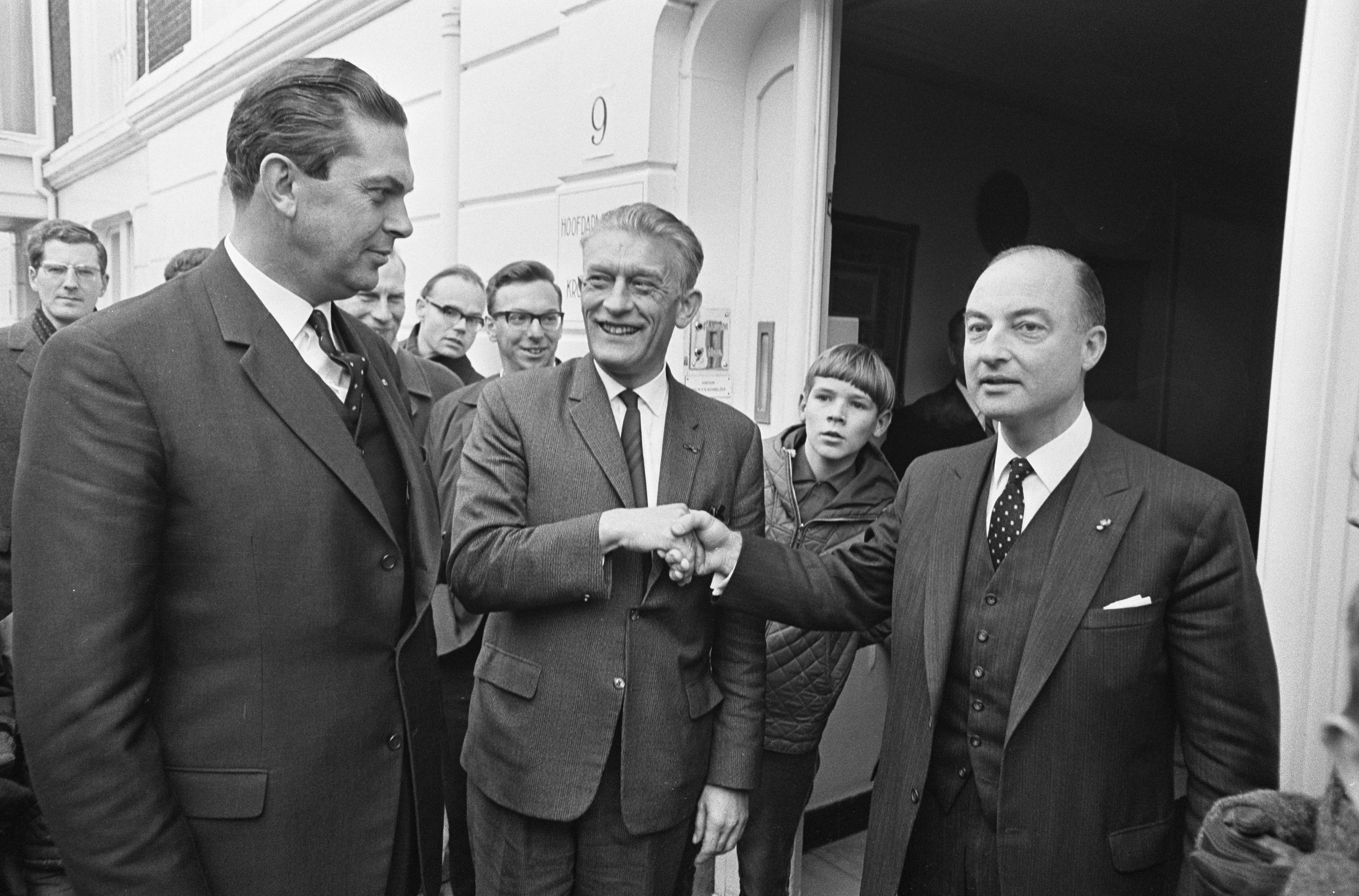
Barend Biesheuvel and Bauke Roolvink arriving at the house of formateur Schmelzer on 1 November 1966

On 20 October, Schmelzer contacted former ARP Finance minister Jelle Zijlstra, who had been appointed president of De Nederlandsche Bank but was not set to start until 1 May 1967. Zijlstra responded that he would first need the support of his own party, the ARP. The parliamentary group had voted against the motion, making it illogical for a party member to lead an interim cabinet responsible for implementing it. Within his party, a power struggle was also going on between parliamentary group leader Bauke Roolvink, who had wanted to vote in favour of the motion, and deputy prime minister Barend Biesheuvel, who had prevented that. While this was ongoing, Zijlstra could not accept, but was open to it if things had cleared up.

Schmelzer then approached former CHU minister Jan de Pous, but he feared he would not be able to return to his position as chair of the Social and Economic Council (SER) afterwards. De Pous declined on 29 October. Former KVP prime minister Jan de Quay also declined. Meanwhile, on 31 October, Biesheuvel and Roolvink presented Schmelzer with a compromise, with which the Cals cabinet might be able to continue. Schmelzer however disagreed with the delay of the tax reduction and did not expect the PvdA to agree with additional coverage in the budget. Schmelzer thus decided to ignore this plan.

==== De Jong & Veldkamp ====
Schmelzer had found Defence minister Piet de Jong as candidate prime minister. In that case, he had professor Hans Bosman as a candidate for the ministry of Finance. However KVP minister of Social Affairs and Health Gerard Veldkamp objected, because he was disappointed that De Jong was preferred, and he believed that a respected economist should become prime minister.

Professor Piet Steenkamp, who was approached for the position at Social Affairs, was also not in favor of De Jong and would have preferred Veldkamp as prime minister or have him remain as minister of Social Affairs. Ministers Luns and De Jong as well as an increasing number of KVP prominents were in favor of a KVP minority cabinet with Veldkamp as prime minister. However, Aalberse and Klompé were strongly opposed to Veldkamp becoming prime minister. As a compromise, Schmelzer offered Veldkamp the vice premiership, the Ministry of Social Affairs and the portfolio of Suriname and Dutch Antilles on 2 November. But on 3 November, Veldkamp responded negatively, leading Schmelzer to return his assignment.

== Informateur Beel ==
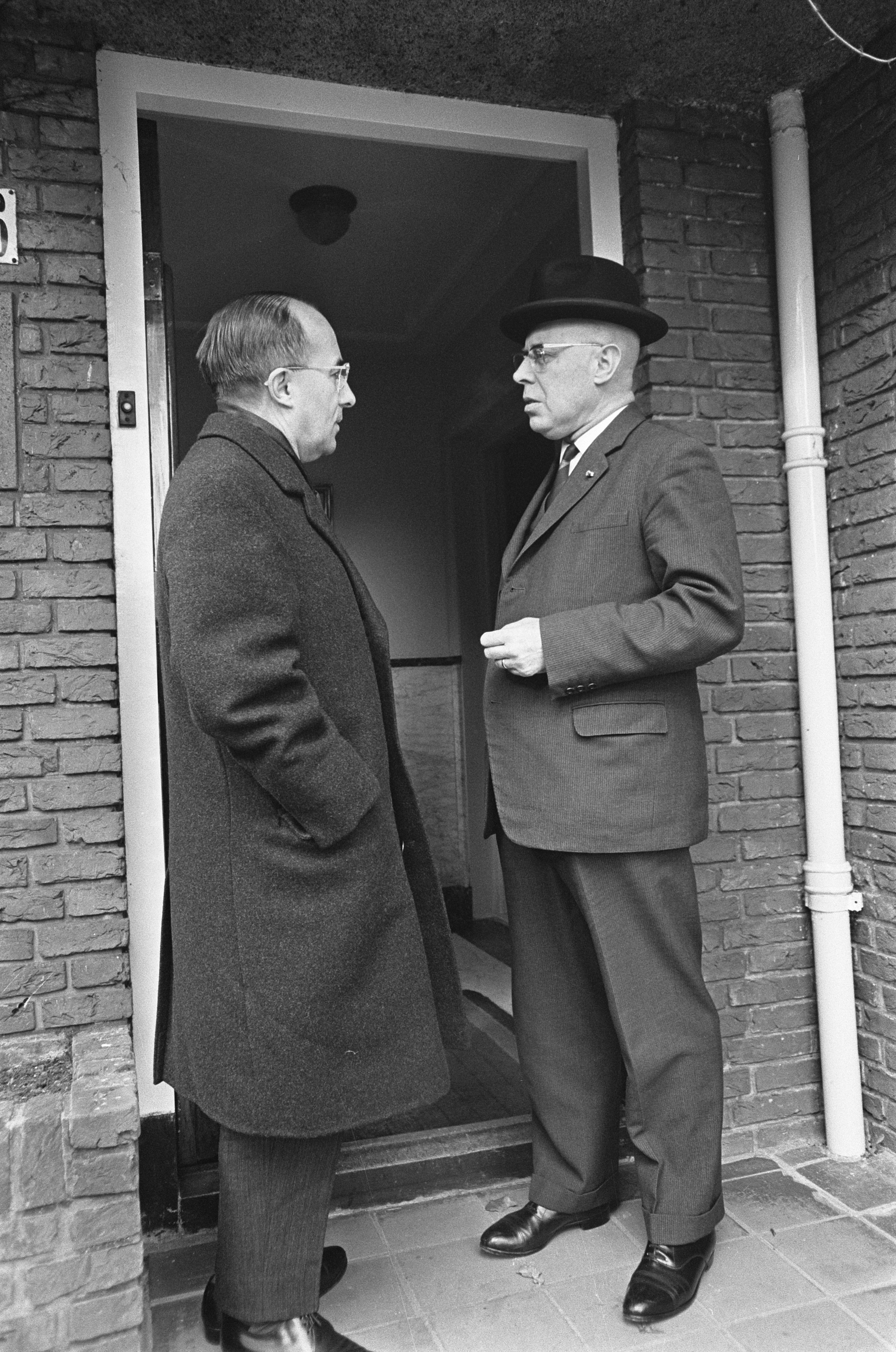
Prime minister Cals and informateur Beel on 5 November 1966

On 4 November, Queen Juliana appointed Beel informateur. He first explored whether the cabinet could be reconstructed, which Biesheuvel preferred. He presented a compromise, which included delay of the tax reduction and increase of the sales tax. On 13 November, PvdA parliamentary group leader Gerard Nederhorst declined. Beel also concluded that Cals would only return if the cabinet was reconstructed with the same parties and nearly the same people.

Beel covinced Zijlstra to become prime minister with De Quay as deputy prime minister. On 15 November, Roolvink and ARP ministers also called upon Zijlstra to form a cabinet. The ARP united around Beels plan. The compromise was harder to swallow for KVP. as Schmelzer had opposed the delay of the reduction. Schmelzer told his parliamentary group this was necessary because the forecast had worsened. On 16 November, Beel handed in his final report.

== Formateur Zijlstra ==
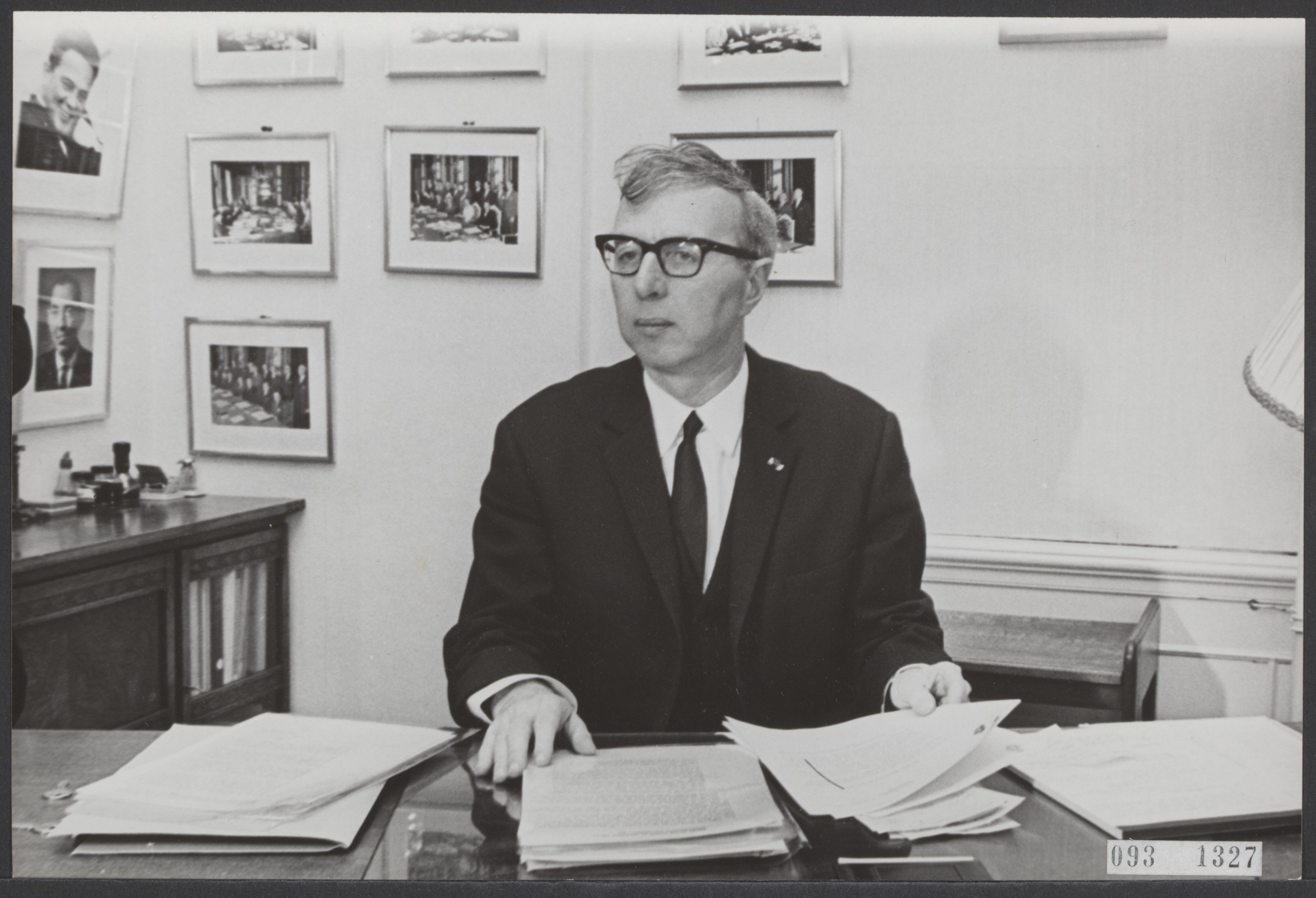
Formateur Jelle Zijlstra on 17 November 1966

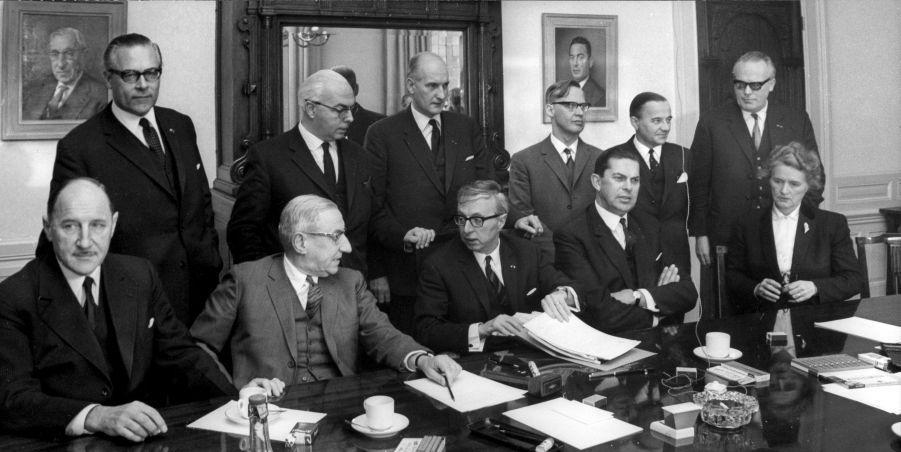
The ministers of the Zijlstra cabinet

After Beel handed in his report, Zijlstra was appointed as formateur. On 17 November he met with the parliamentary leaders of the largest parties. The next day, Schmelzer had to threaten to resign to get his parliamentary group behind Zijlstra. In the end, Van Doorn was the only one who kept objecting.

On 19 November, the CHU parliamentary group notified Zijlstra that they would not participate in the interim cabinet. The expected KVP ministers feared this would give the cabinet too little support in the House. De Quay and Klompé contacted former minister Willem Scholten and MP freule Wttewaall van Stoetwegen (both CHU). Wttewaal van Stoetwegen had not been presented when the CHU had made this decision and protested. She succeeded in convincing Beernink to alter course. Beernink secretly visited Zijlstra on 20 November. Zijlstra promised promised to look at the budget again, after which Beernink told Zijlstra they would provide confidence and supply without CHU ministers in the cabinet. This gave the KVP ministers sufficient confidence.

On 22 November, the cabinet was sworn in. The PvdA ministers as well as Cals and Pieter Bogaers were replaced. Zijlstra considered Bogaers to have a fundamentally wrong way of looking at the government budget. The only non-PvdA state secretary to not return was Wiel Hoefnagels (Finance). Louis van Son (KVP) was the only new state secretary.
