= Norbert Schmelzer =

Dutch politician (1921–2008)

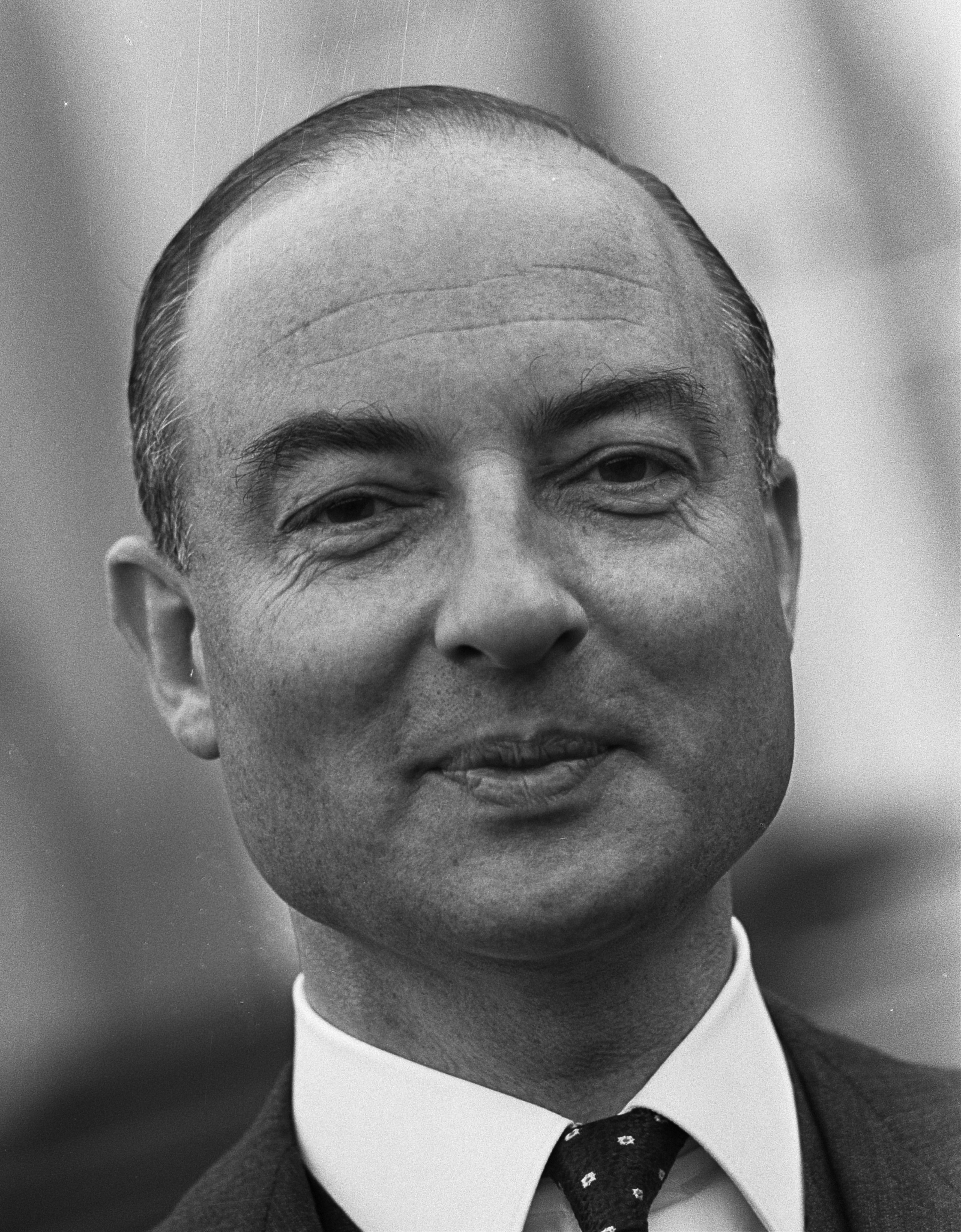
- Schmelzer in 1966

Minister of Foreign Affairs
- In office 6 July 1971 – 11 May 1973
- Prime Minister: Barend Biesheuvel
- Preceded by: Joseph Luns
- Succeeded by: Max van der Stoel

Member of Senate
- In office 11 May 1971 – 6 July 1971

Leader of the Catholic People's Party in the House of Representatives
- In office 7 December 1963 – 28 April 1971
- Preceded by: Wim de Kort
- Succeeded by: Cor Kleisterlee Jr.

Leader of the Catholic People's Party
- In office 7 December 1963 – 25 February 1971
- Preceded by: Wim de Kort
- Succeeded by: Gerard Veringa

Member of the House of Representatives
- In office 2 July 1963 – 11 May 1971
- In office 20 March 1959 – 19 May 1959

State Secretary of General Affairs
- In office 19 May 1959 – 24 July 1963
- Prime Minister: Jan de Quay
- Preceded by: Office established
- Succeeded by: Office abolished

State Secretary of the Interior, Property and Public Sector Organisations
- In office 29 October 1956 – 19 May 1959
- Prime Minister: Willem Drees (1956–1958); Louis Beel (1958–1959)
- Preceded by: Office established
- Succeeded by: Theo Bot as State Secretary of the Interior

Personal details
- Born: Wilhelm Klaus Norbert Schmelzer; 22 March 1921 Rotterdam, Netherlands
- Died: 14 November 2008 (aged 87) Sankt Ingbert, Germany
- Party: Christian Democratic Appeal (from 1980)
- Other political affiliations: Catholic People's Party (1952–1980)
- Spouses: Carla Mutsaerts (m. 1950; div. 1977) Daphne Mary Nieuwenhuizen (m. 1977)
- Children: 3 sons and 2 daughters (first marriage)
- Education: Tilburg Catholic Economic University

Wilhelm Klaus Norbert Schmelzer (22 March 1921 – 14 November 2008) was a Dutch politician and economist who served as party leader of the Catholic People's Party (KVP) from 1963 to 1971 and Minister of Foreign Affairs from 1971 to 1973.

== Early career ==
Schmelzer attended the gymnasium at the Jesuit Sint Aloysius College in The Hague from June 1933 until July 1939 and applied at the Tilburg Catholic Economic University in July 1939, majoring in Economics. On 10 May 1940 Nazi Germany invaded the Netherlands and the government fled to London to escape the German occupation. During the German occupation Schmelzer continued his study obtaining a Bachelor of Economics degree in June 1941 before graduating with a Master of Economics degree in September 1945. Schmelzer worked as a civil servant for the Ministry of Economic Affairs from February 1947 until October 1956 for the department for Financial and Economic Policy from February 1947 until August 1951 and the department for European and International Policy from August 1951 until October 1956.

== Political career ==
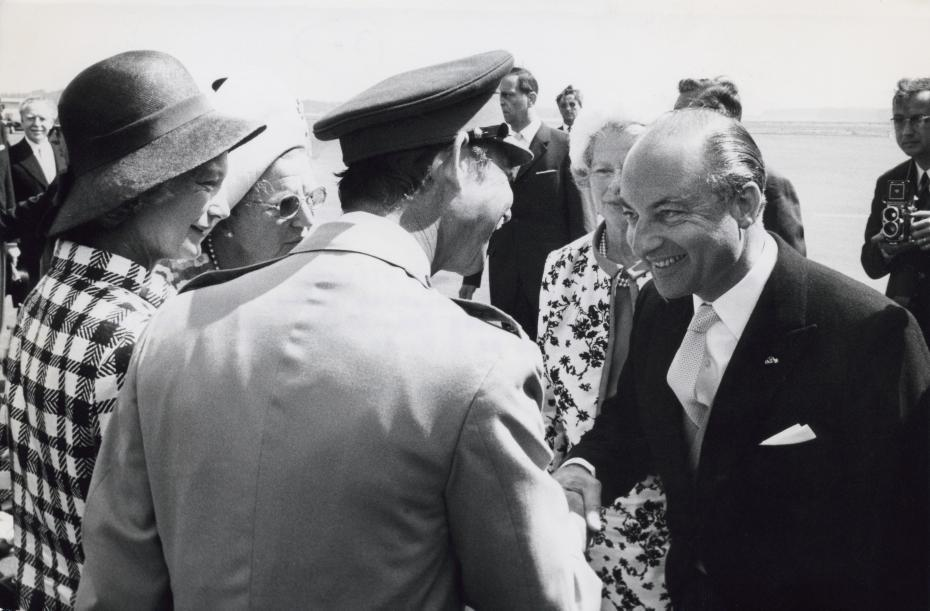
Princess Joséphine Charlotte of Belgium, Queen Juliana, Grand Duke Jean of Luxembourg and Minister of Foreign Affairs Norbert Schmelzer at Luxembourg Airport on 7 July 1971

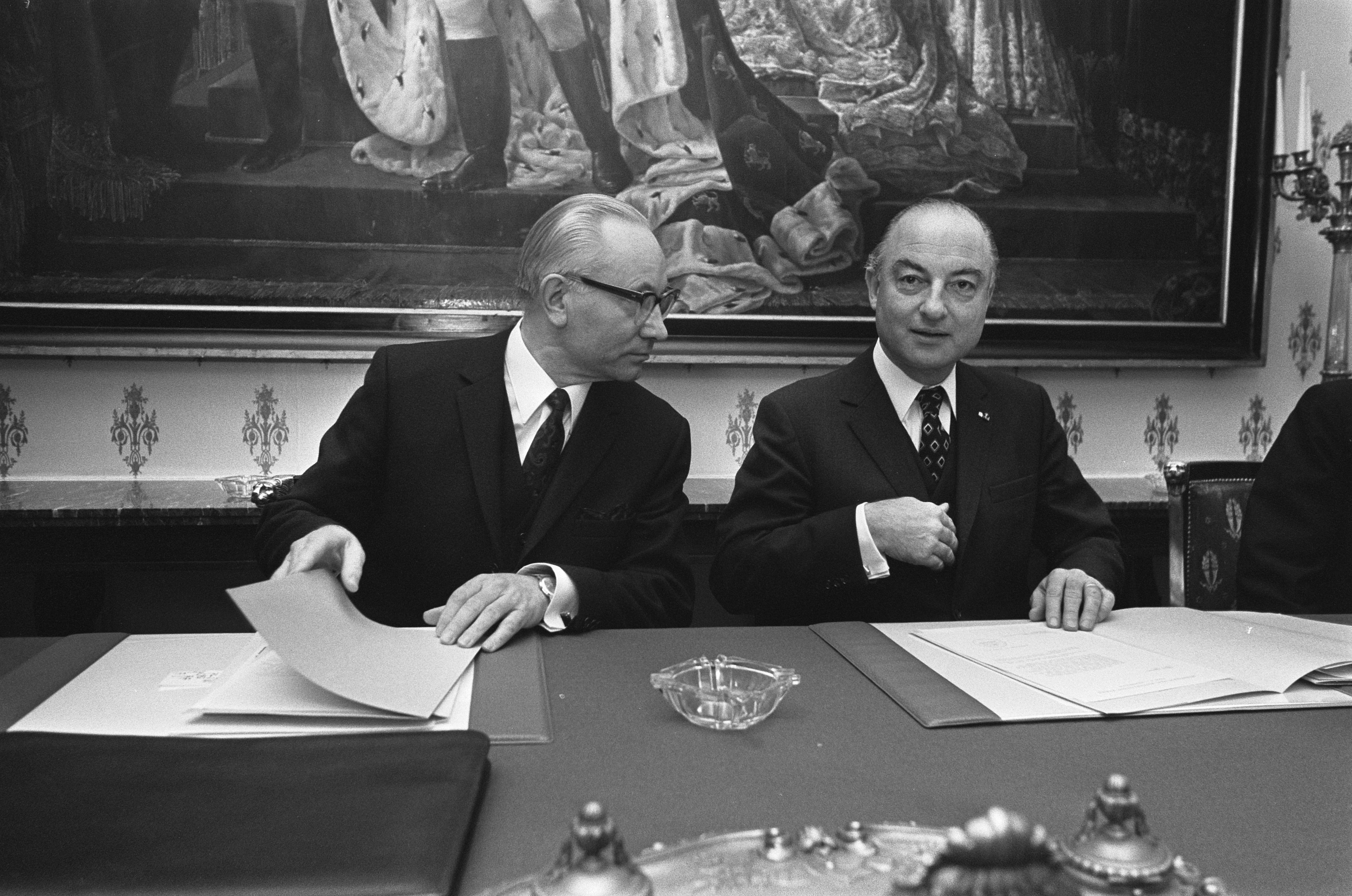
Ambassador of the Soviet Union to the Netherlands Vladimir Lavrov and Minister of Foreign Affairs Norbert Schmelzer during a meeting at the Ministry of Foreign Affairs on 25 January 1973

After the 1956 general election, Schmelzer was appointed as State Secretary of the Interior in the Drees III cabinet, taking office on 29 October 1956. This cabinet fell on 11 December 1958, and continued to serve in a demissionary capacity until the cabinet formation of 1958, when it was replaced by the caretaker Beel II cabinet, with Schmelzer continuing as State Secretary of the Interior, taking office on 22 December 1958. Schmelzer was elected to the House of Representatives at the 1959 general election, taking office on 20 March. Following the cabinet formation of 1959, Schmelzer was appointed as State Secretary of General Affairs in the De Quay cabinet, taking office on 19 May 1959. The office of was created specifically for Schmelzer and was considered as a de facto Deputy Prime Minister. After the 1963 general election, Schmelzer returned to the House of Representatives, taking office on 2 July 1963. Following the cabinet formation of 1963, Schmelzer per his own request asked not to be considered for a cabinet post in the new Marijnen cabinet, which took office on 24 July 1963.

He was seen as a rising star by the Catholic People's Party's leadership and was considered as the favourite son to succeed Wim de Kort as party leader. In November 1963, De Kort announced he was stepping down as leader and parliamentary leader in the House of Representatives. The party leadership approached Schmelzer to be his successor, who accepted and took office as party leader and parliamentary leader on 7 December 1963. On 27 February 1965 the Marijnen cabinet fell and continued to serve in a demissionary capacity, and Schmelzer was appointed as formateur. Following a failed cabinet formation attempt, he approached former Minister of Education, Arts and Sciences Jo Cals as a candidate for Prime Minister. Cals accepted and was appointed as formateur to form a new cabinet. The following cabinet formation of 1965 resulted in a coalition agreement between the Catholic People's Party, the Labour Party (PvdA) and the Anti-Revolutionary Party (ARP) which formed the Cals cabinet on 14 April 1965.

On 14 October 1966, in what would come to be known as the Night of Schmelzer, Schmelzer tabled a motion in the House of Representatives that called on the government to pursue a stronger financial and economic policy in order to further reduce the deficit. Cals saw this as an indirect motion of no confidence from his own party against his cabinet, and announced the resignation of the cabinet that same day. The Cals cabinet continued to serve in a demissionary capacity until the cabinet formation of 1966, when it was replaced by the caretaker Zijlstra cabinet on 22 November 1966.

For the 1967 general election, Schmelzer served as lead candidate. The Catholic People's Party suffered a small loss, losing 8 seats, but it retained its position as the largest party with 42 seats in the House of Representatives. The following cabinet formation of 1967 resulted in a coalition agreement between the Catholic People's Party, the People's Party for Freedom and Democracy (VVD), the Anti-Revolutionary Party and the Christian Historical Union (CHU), which formed the De Jong cabinet on 5 April 1967. In February 1971, Schmelzer unexpectedly announced that he was stepping down as party leader and that he would not stand for the 1971 general election, but wanted to stand for the Senate. Schmelzer was elected to Senate after the 1971 Senate election; he resigned as a member of the House of Representatives the same day he was installed as a member of Senate, taking office on 11 May 1971. Following the cabinet formation of 1971, Schmelzer was appointed as Minister of Foreign Affairs in the Biesheuvel I cabinet, taking office on 6 July 1971. This cabinet fell just one year later on 19 July 1972 and continued to serve in a demissionary capacity until it was replaced by the caretaker Biesheuvel II cbainet, with Schmelzer continuing as Minister of Foreign Affairs, taking office on 9 August 1972. In September 1972, Schmelzer announced his retirement from national politics, stating he would not stand for the 1972 general election. The Biesheuvel II cabinet was replaced by the Den Uyl cabinet following the cabinet formation of 1973 on 11 May 1973.

== Late career ==
Schmelzer retired after spending sixteen years in national politics and became active in the private and public sector; he occupied numerous seats as a corporate director and nonprofit director on several boards of directors and supervisory boards (Douwe Egberts, Akzo, Heijmans, Netherlands Atlantic Association and the Institute of International Relations Clingendael) and served on several state commissions and councils on behalf of the government (KPN, Public Pension Funds PFZW and the Cadastre Agency), as well as served as a diplomat and lobbyist for several economic delegations on behalf of the government and the European Economic Community. Schmelzer was also a prolific composer, pianist and poet having written more than a dozen compositions and poems from 1973.

Schmelzer, who joined the newly-formed Christian Democratic Appeal (CDA) in 1980, was known for his abilities as a debater and negotiator. He continued to comment on political affairs until his death at the age of 87. He holds the distinction as the first State Secretary of the Interior and the first and only State Secretary of General Affairs.

== Decorations ==
Honours
Ribbon bar	Honour	Country	Date	Comment
	Knight of the Order of the Holy Sepulchre	Holy See	1957	
	Grand Cross of the Order of the Crown	Belgium	1959	
	Grand Officer of the Legion of Honour	France	1964	
	Grand Officer of the Order of the Oak Crown	Luxembourg	1969	
	Grand Cross of the Order of Merit	Portugal	1971	
	Knight Grand Cross of the Order of Isabella the Catholic	Spain	1971	
	Grand Cross of the Order of Merit	Germany	1971	
	Honorary Knight Grand Cross of the Order of St Michael and St George	United Kingdom	1972	
	Grand Officer of the Order of the Liberator	Venezuela	1972	
	Knight Grand Cross of the Order of the White Elephant	Thailand	11 February 1973	
	Commander of the Order of the Netherlands Lion	Netherlands	8 June 1973	
	Knight Grand Cross of the Order of Orange-Nassau	Netherlands	15 March 1991	Elevated from Grand Officer (27 July 1963)
	Grand Cross of the National Order of Merit	France		

Party political offices
Preceded by Wim de Kort	Parliamentary leader of the Catholic People's Party in the House of Representatives; 1963–1971	Succeeded by Cor Kleisterlee Jr.
Preceded by Wim de Kort	Leader of the Catholic People's Party; 1963–1971	Succeeded by Gerard Veringa
Preceded by Wim de Kort; 1963	Lead candidate of the Catholic People's Party; 1967	Succeeded by Gerard Veringa; 1971
Political offices
New office	State Secretary of the Interior, Property and Public Sector Organisations; 1956–1959	Succeeded by Theo Bot as State Secretary of the Interior
New office	State Secretary of General Affairs; 1959–1963	Office abolished
Preceded by Joseph Luns	Minister of Foreign Affairs; 1971–1973	Succeeded by Max van der Stoel
