= 1967 Dutch general election =

Election of the members of the House of Representatives

- 15 February 1967
- All 150 seats in the House of Representatives; 76 seats needed for a majority
- Turnout: 94.9% (▼0.2 pp)
Party	Leader	Vote %	Seats	+/–
KVP	Norbert Schmelzer	26.5%	42	−8
PvdA	Joop den Uyl	23.6%	37	−6
VVD	Edzo Toxopeus	10.7%	17	+1
ARP	Barend Biesheuvel	9.9%	15	+2
CHU	Henk Beernink	8.1%	12	−1
BP	Hendrik Koekoek	4.8%	7	+4
D'66	Hans van Mierlo	4.5%	7	New
CPN	Marcus Bakker	3.6%	5	+1
PSP	Henk Lankhorst	2.9%	4	0
SGP	Cor van Dis Sr.	2.0%	3	0
GPV	Piet Jongeling	0.9%	1	0
This lists parties that won seats. See the complete results below.
Most voted-for party by municipality
Cabinet before	Cabinet after
Zijlstra cabinet KVP–ARP	De Jong cabinet KVP–VVD–ARP–CHU

A general election was held in the Netherlands on 15 February 1967. The Catholic People's Party (KVP) remained the largest party, though it suffered considerable losses, dropping to 42 of the 150 seats in the House of Representatives. The Labour Party (PvdA) also lost seats, and became the second party. The newly founded Democrats 66 entered the House with seven seats, while the Farmers' Party (BP) grew from three to seven seats.

The elections led to a four-party centre-right coalition government being formed, consisting of the KVP, People's Party for Freedom and Democracy (VVD), Anti-Revolutionary Party (ARP) and Christian Historical Union (CHU), led by prime minister Piet de Jong. Held amid the Counterculture of the 1960s, the election is regarded as a turning point in Dutch politics, representing the end of half a century of consociationalism and the beginning of the polarisation strategy.

== Background ==
The previous 1963 general election resulted in the formation of the centre-right Marijnen cabinet, consisting the Catholic People's Party (KVP), the Anti-Revolutionary Party (ARP), the Christian Historical Union (CHU) and the People's Party for Freedom and Democracy (VVD). However, the cabinet collapsed after two years over the matter of public broadcasting reform, with the VVD opposing the pillarised broadcasting system. In its stead, the centre-left Cals cabinet was formed, consisting of the KVP, the ARP and the Labour Party (PvdA).

The Cals cabinet was faced with contentious issues surrounding the rise of the Counterculture of the 1960s, including controversial tax rises, riots surrounding the wedding of Princess Beatrix and Claus van Amsberg, the Provo movement and the storming of the De Telegraaf headquarters. With this background, the PvdA suffered considerable losses in the 1966 elections for the provincial councils, which worsened relations within the coalition. In October 1966, in what would become known as the Night of Schmelzer, tensions climaxed when the House of Representatives passed a motion tabled KVP parliamentary leader Norbert Schmelzer which criticised the cabinet's financial policy. The cabinet regarded the passing of the motion as a lack of confidence, and consequently resigned. The KVP and ARP continued in the rump centre-right Zijlstra cabinet, which was to prepare the 1967 snap election.

== Electoral system ==
The 150 members of the House of Representatives were elected using party-list proportional representation. The 1967 general election was the first held after the lowering of the voting age to 21, and the age of candidacy to 25.

== Campaign ==
The election campaign, which took place in the winter of 1966 to 1967, focussed on the preceding events, including the fall of the centre-right Marijnen cabinet and subsequent formation of the centre-left Cals cabinet without an intervening election, as well as the Night of Schmelzer. These events gave rise to the notion that the political system had become outdated, and prompted calls for democratisation, inspired by 1960s counterculture. On the day after the Night of Schmelzer, Hans van Mierlo and Hans Gruijters founded the Democrats 66 (D'66), a political party calling for democratic reform. Meanwhile, the period leading up to the election saw a notable shift of the PvdA, now led by Joop den Uyl. The Night of Schmelzer had soured relations with the confessional parties, and the rise of the New Left movement led the party to move to the left and adopt the polarisation strategy.

Television played a significant role in the campaign. A televised debate was organised by the AVRO broadcaster, which included parties that did not yet hold any seats. The six new parties were each allowed three minutes to deliver a so-called "soapbox speech", with Van Mierlo making the greatest impression. On the eve of election day, a debate was organised with the party leaders of all political parties. These programmes achieved very high viewing figures and ratings.

== Results ==
In stark contrast to preceding elections, the 1967 election showed considerable volatility, with around a quarter of voters having changed their vote compared to the last election. The KVP and PvdA both suffered their worst-ever election result, losing eight and six seats respectively. The ARP won two additional seats, owing largely to the popularity of prime minister Jelle Zijlstra, while the CHU and VVD remained stable. The main benefactors of the election were D'66, which entered the house with seven seats, and the BP, which grew from three to seven.

Party	Votes	%	Seats	+/–
Catholic People's Party	1,822,939	26.50	42	–8
Labour Party	1,620,447	23.55	37	–6
People's Party for Freedom and Democracy	738,229	10.73	17	+1
Anti-Revolutionary Party	681,203	9.90	15	+2
Christian Historical Union	560,467	8.15	12	–1
Farmers' Party	328,186	4.77	7	+4
Democrats 1966	307,859	4.48	7	New
Communist Party of the Netherlands	248,330	3.61	5	+1
Pacifist Socialist Party	197,217	2.87	4	0
Reformed Political Party	138,119	2.01	3	0
Reformed Political League	59,218	0.86	1	0
Emergency Council	45,485	0.66	0	New
Christian Democratic Union	45,346	0.66	0	New
Party for the Unmarried	43,340	0.63	0	New
Land Interests	17,596	0.26	0	New
Liberal People's Party	11,292	0.16	0	New
Voogd List	4,808	0.07	0	New
Van Breukelen-Grein List	3,560	0.05	0	New
Machiela List	1,676	0.02	0	New
Germeaux List	1,218	0.02	0	New
Party of the Right	1,070	0.02	0	New
Christian National People's Party	992	0.01	0	0
Rodermond List	916	0.01	0	New
Total	6,879,513	100.00	150	0
Valid votes	6,879,513	97.20		
Invalid/blank votes	198,298	2.80		
Total votes	7,077,811	100.00		
Registered voters/turnout	7,450,680	95.00		
Source: Kiesraad

=== By province ===
Results by province
Province	KVP	PvdA	VVD	ARP	CHU	BP	D'66	CPN	PSP	SGP	GPV	Others
Drenthe	7.0	35.5	14.0	15.1	11.4	6.5	2.1	2.9	1.7	0.4	1.6	1.9
Friesland	6.5	31.7	8.1	22.8	15.3	3.3	2.4	2.8	3.6	0.7	1.4	1.5
Gelderland	27.2	22.9	9.7	9.5	11.8	7.0	3.4	1.2	1.5	3.2	0.6	2.0
Groningen	5.5	33.2	12.0	16.7	9.7	4.6	2.7	6.4	3.5	0.2	3.8	1.8
Limburg	63.7	11.8	5.1	1.9	1.0	5.9	3.1	2.2	1.3	0.1	0.1	3.9
North Brabant	56.6	10.5	7.5	4.1	2.5	6.7	4.8	1.3	1.4	0.6	0.2	3.8
North Holland	19.8	24.7	13.1	8.4	5.2	4.2	6.9	8.7	5.0	0.5	0.4	3.0
Overijssel	25.5	23.1	8.1	10.5	12.7	5.8	2.7	2.9	2.3	2.7	2.2	1.5
South Holland	15.8	29.3	12.9	11.7	9.2	2.8	5.0	3.2	3.4	3.6	0.7	2.3
Southern IJsselmeer Polders	18.5	22.0	10.3	20.8	14.1	2.8	3.5	0.9	2.0	1.2	2.6	1.2
Utrecht	21.5	22.7	13.1	12.2	11.0	3.9	4.5	1.8	2.5	3.0	1.3	2.4
Zeeland	17.6	24.3	10.4	12.6	15.0	4.0	2.2	0.8	1.4	8.6	1.1	2.0

== Aftermath ==
After the election, Queen Juliana appointed prime minister Zijlstra (ARP) as formateur, and he was followed by Piet de Jong (KVP), who succeeded in forming the centre-right De Jong cabinet, thus returning the PvdA to the opposition benches. The election is regarded as a turning point in Dutch politics, representing the end of half a century of consociationalism and the beginning of the polarisation strategy.

== Sources ==
- Lijphart, A. (1990). Verzuiling, pacificatie en kentering in de Nederlandse politiek [Pillarisation, pacification and upheaval in Dutch politics] (PDF) (in Dutch) (8 ed.). Haarlem.
