= 2021–present Binnenhof renovation =

Renovation of Dutch government buildings

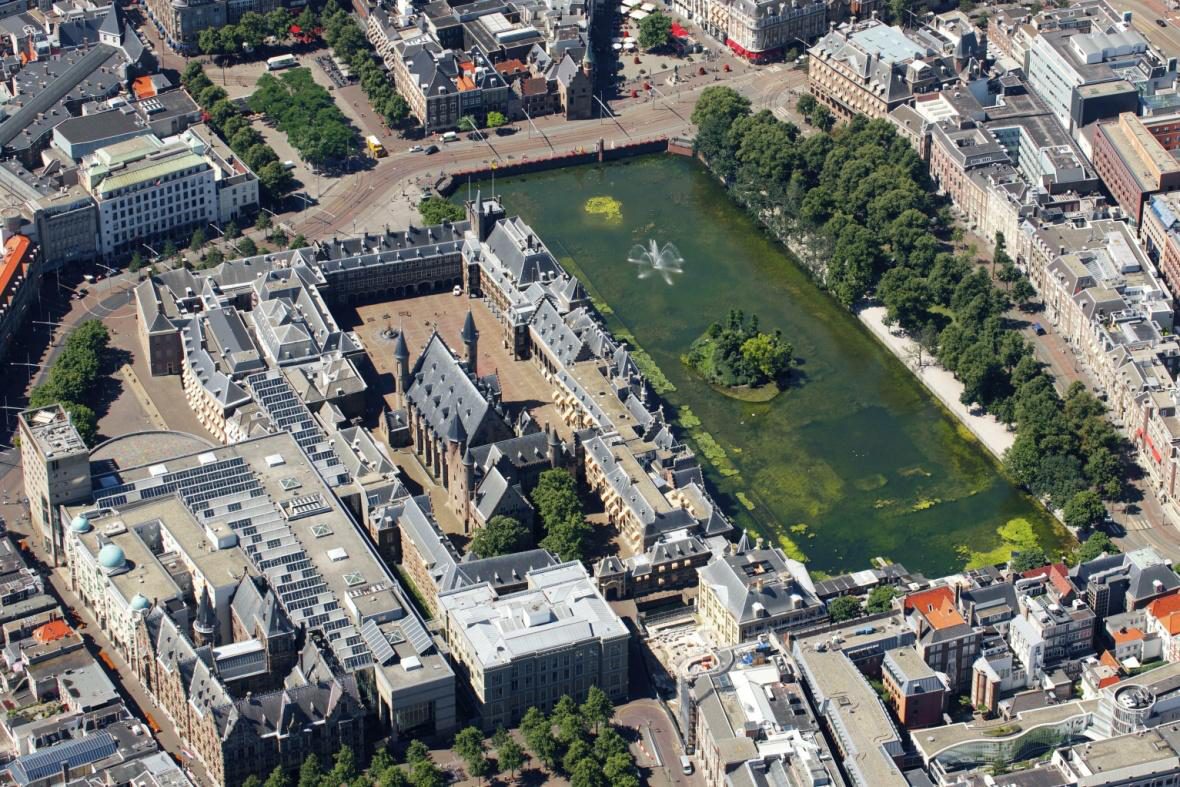
Aerial view of the Binnenhof (2015)

Since 1 October 2021, the Binnenhof in The Hague, Netherlands, has been undergoing renovation. The goal is to make the buildings, including those of the Senate and House of Representatives, future-proof. The House of Representatives wished for this to be done in a modest and efficient manner. After controversy over the "megalomaniac" plans of the original architect, the architects were bought off. The decision to renovate was made in 2015; the renovation was planned to start at the end of 2020 and be completed five years later. The expected completion date is at the earliest December 2028. Due to delays, setbacks, higher demands, and the building being in worse condition than expected, the originally planned costs of 475 million euros rose to at least 2 billion euros by April 2024.

== Background ==
=== Necessity ===
The last major maintenance of the Binnenhof took place in 1992 with the expansion of the House of Representatives. Over the years, especially in the 2010s, more and more deficiencies came to light. A well-known example was in December 2011 when a lamp fell to the ground right next to Minister Edith Schippers during a debate. The cabinet was, however, hesitant to renovate during that period because it would have appeared poorly in a time of budget cuts.

At the request of the Minister for Housing and the Central Government Sector Stef Blok, former minister Liesbeth Spies, together with the Rijksvastgoedbedrijf, investigated the necessity of renovation in 2014. They concluded that many installations were at the end of their technical lifespan, endangering safety and operations. Work was further complicated by the presence of asbestos. In particular, the fire safety of the complex was insufficient. The Hague's fire department commander even threatened immediate closure if renovation was not promptly decided upon, as the Binnenhof did not meet legal requirements.

=== Renovation scenarios ===
Based on this necessity, Spies proposed two scenarios. The first would take approximately 5.5 years and cost around 450 million euros, but would require all Binnenhof residents to relocate for the entire period. The second scenario would keep the Binnenhof in use, but phased renovation would take at least thirteen years and cost around 550 million euros. Spies recommended the first option but understood the residents' desire to stay as long as possible.

Although the cabinet chose the shorter option, both the Senate and the House initially opposed this plan. Therefore, in December 2015, Blok commissioned another study on phased renovation, after which the House of Representatives agreed in July 2016 to a single-phase renovation.

Dissatisfied with the relocation, the House of Representatives presidium commissioned another study in 2020 on the necessity of this move. This study concluded that phased renovation without relocation would be cheaper and not significantly more time-consuming. This while at the end of December 2020, an independent study commissioned by the Netherlands Ministry of the Interior still concluded that a renovation without relocation could lead to safety risks and additional costs amounting to half a billion euros.

=== Residents' wishes ===
In 2015, the users of the House of Representatives building were asked about their wishes for the renovation. Only three of the eleven parliamentary groups responded.

== Design process ==
Rijksbouwmeester Floris Alkemade was responsible for appointing an architect. Due to confidentiality imposed by the cabinet for security reasons, there was no public tender. Alkemade and the Rijksvastgoedbedrijf chose Ellen van Loon from the architectural firm Office for Metropolitan Architecture (OMA) as the coordinating architect. This recommendation was presented to the steering committee, consisting of supporting officials, on 10 March 2017, which agreed. In September 2017, Van Loon presented her design to the construction supervision committee, consisting of Members of Parliament and officials, for the first time. Although she and the Rijksvastgoedbedrijf believed it was well-received, it turned out that the construction supervision committee felt blindsided, as they had not delved into it themselves and were not familiar with the ambition document.

The architect of the expansion of the House of Representatives in 1992, Pi de Bruijn, had wanted to lead this renovation but was initially designated as a sub-architect. On Alkemade's initiative, there was intensive contact between Van Loon and De Bruijn, partly because he held the copyright to the building, but this communication went very poorly. Dissatisfied with his role, De Bruijn contacted then Democrats 66 party leader Alexander Pechtold in the spring of 2018. Through him, De Bruijn got in touch with Speaker of the House Khadija Arib and Member of Parliament Ockje Tellegen, who had just become chair of the construction supervision committee.

Concerned about what they heard from De Bruijn, they organized a meeting with Van Loon and Alkemade for the first time on 19 July 2018. In this meeting, the MPs criticized the design, partly because they did not find it modest and efficient. They also felt insufficiently involved in the selection of OMA as the architectural firm. Alkemade countered that the civil steering committee had agreed and that the construction supervision committee had long been aware of this. Subsequently, Arib and Tellegen appointed a new housing director, who advised the House to write down their renovation wishes and to push for De Bruijn as the coordinating architect. The House, therefore, drew up a new product requirements document, although Van Loon remained contractually bound to the previously established ambition document. Direct contact between Van Loon and MPs was prohibited by the Rijksvastgoedbedrijf and the House of Representatives' presidium.

On 12 December 2018, the presidium decided to proceed solely with De Bruijn as the architect. He was allowed by the presidium to assess whether Van Loon's plans infringed on his copyright and to come up with alternatives himself. On 12 March 2019, De Bruijn was allowed to present his assessment of Van Loon's design to the construction supervision committee, without Van Loon having had the opportunity herself. In this presentation, De Bruijn mainly talked about his own ideas for a design. Van Loon only got the opportunity to present her plans to the presidium on 26 March 2019, after a senior official from the Ministry of the Interior had made this a condition for Van Loon's possible dismissal.

In June 2019, Pechtold, who had resigned as an MP at the end of 2018, was asked by Knops to mediate between all parties. He concluded that Van Loon had done nothing wrong, but for Knops, her departure had become inevitable. Pechtold advised lifting the confidentiality clause, improving decision-making, and better consultation. Van Loon and her architectural firm were bought out for 2.7 million euros, after which De Bruijn was offered a contract as coordinating architect.

== Plans ==
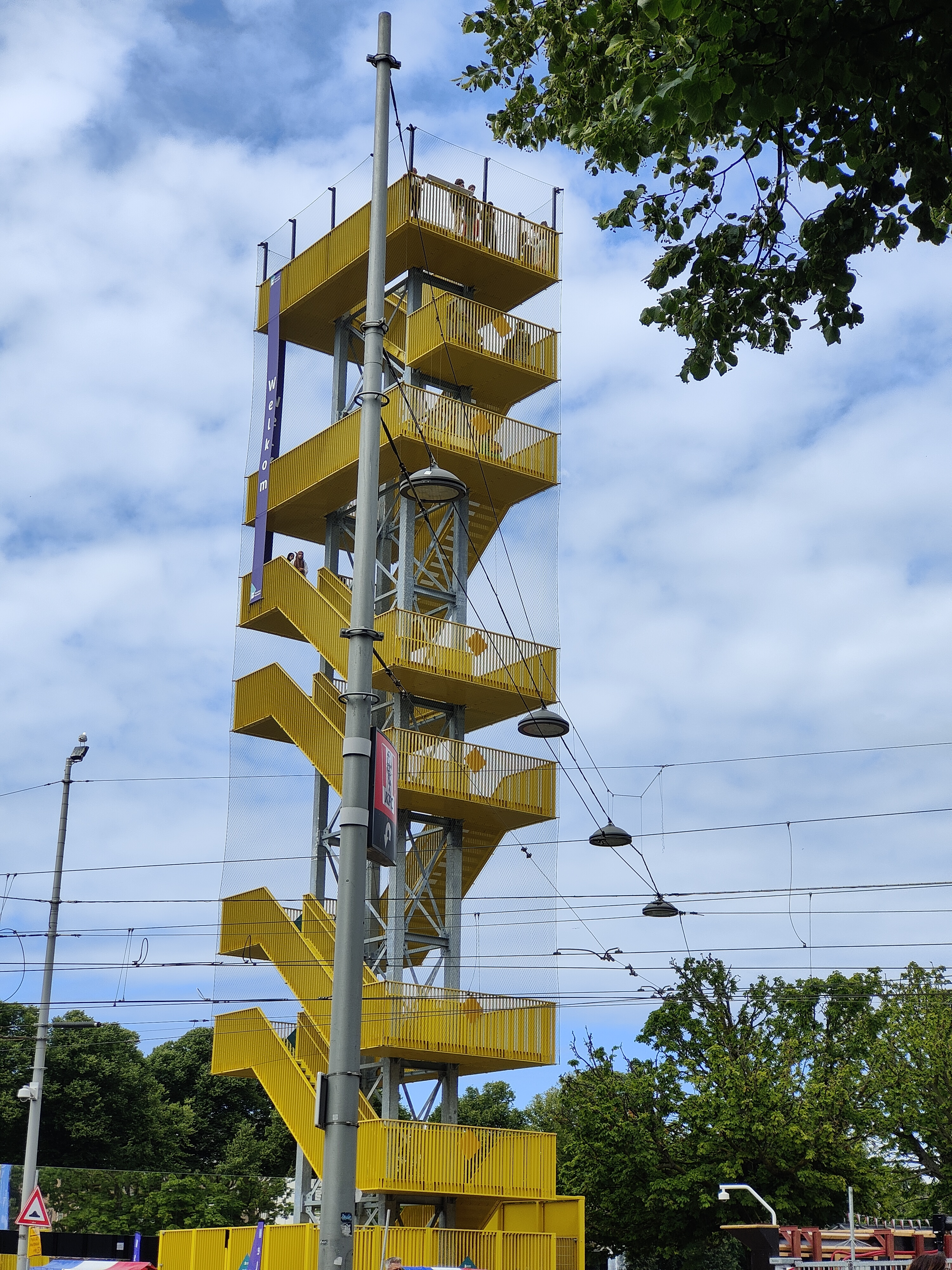
View of the closed Binnenhof offered from a temporary observation tower

Simultaneously with the renovation, the disappeared Hofgracht was also re-dug. This allows for more workspaces and also provides a natural security measure.

== Archaeological finds ==
As early as 2015, SP MP Ronald van Raak had requested the excavation of the remains of Johan van Oldenbarnevelt. His body was buried in 1619 in the crypt of the Counts of Holland beneath the Hofkapel. Because the Hofkapel was too fragile and it was nearly impossible to identify his remains due to the lack of DNA, it was decided not to excavate the remains. However, attempts will be made to map the crypts using cameras.

During the renovation, archaeologists discovered various remains of old buildings at the Binnenhof. Beneath the Senate building, wall remains from the thirteenth century were found. The foundation of a fifteenth-century staircase portal was also uncovered. After documentation by archaeologists, these will be "preserved in the ground". While dismantling suspended ceilings, historical ceilings were discovered. Three skeletons and a bronze coin from 1761 were also found.

On 7 April 2025, it was announced that nearly 800-year-old building traces had been found between the Mauritstoren and the Stadhouderspoort. Researchers concluded that the complex was much larger in the thirteenth century than previously assumed. Already in the earliest construction phase, there was much more development than thought, including a gatehouse. Shortly after its origin around 1230, it was "A court with royal architecture and an even greater ambition as an imperial palace," according to the researchers.

== Relocation ==
=== House of Representatives ===
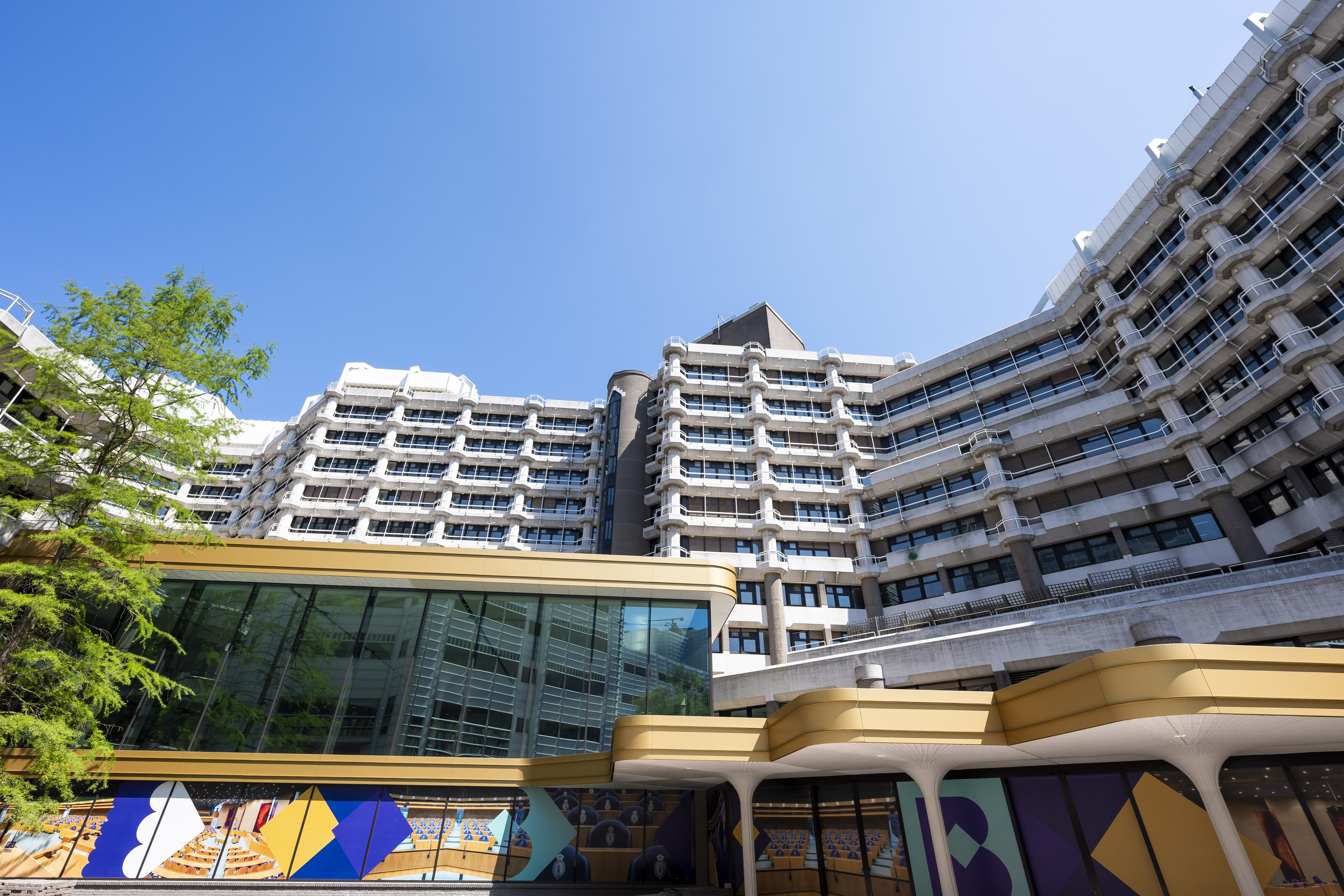
Former Ministry of Foreign Affairs at Bezuidenhoutseweg 67 where the House of Representatives is housed during the renovation.

As temporary accommodation, the House of Representatives was assigned the old Ministry of Foreign Affairs at Bezuidenhoutseweg 67. This building was renovated between 2018 and 2021 to house the parliament. The delivery coincided with the COVID-19 pandemic, raising concerns about whether the building would be COVID-proof. Three external agencies concluded that this was not the case without "drastic measures." Later, one of the external agencies proposed measures to make the building COVID-proof.

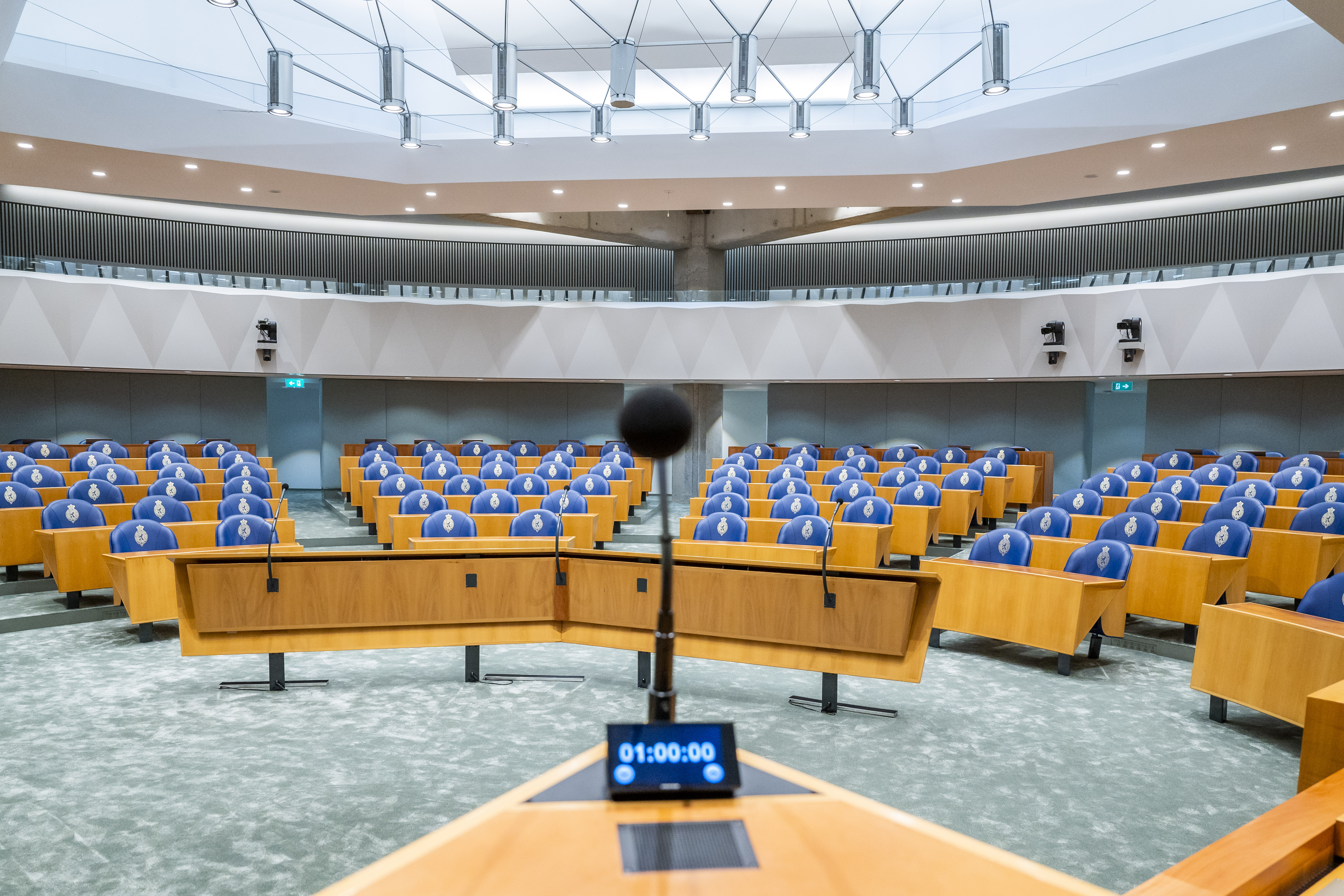
Plenary hall of the temporary location.

In September 2021, the House of Representatives began meeting in the temporary location. Deficiencies were noted in the first year. There was insufficient space for staff and meeting rooms were too noisy. During the summer recess of 2022, several deficiencies were addressed, including the utilization of the vacant eighth floor.

=== Senate and Council of State ===
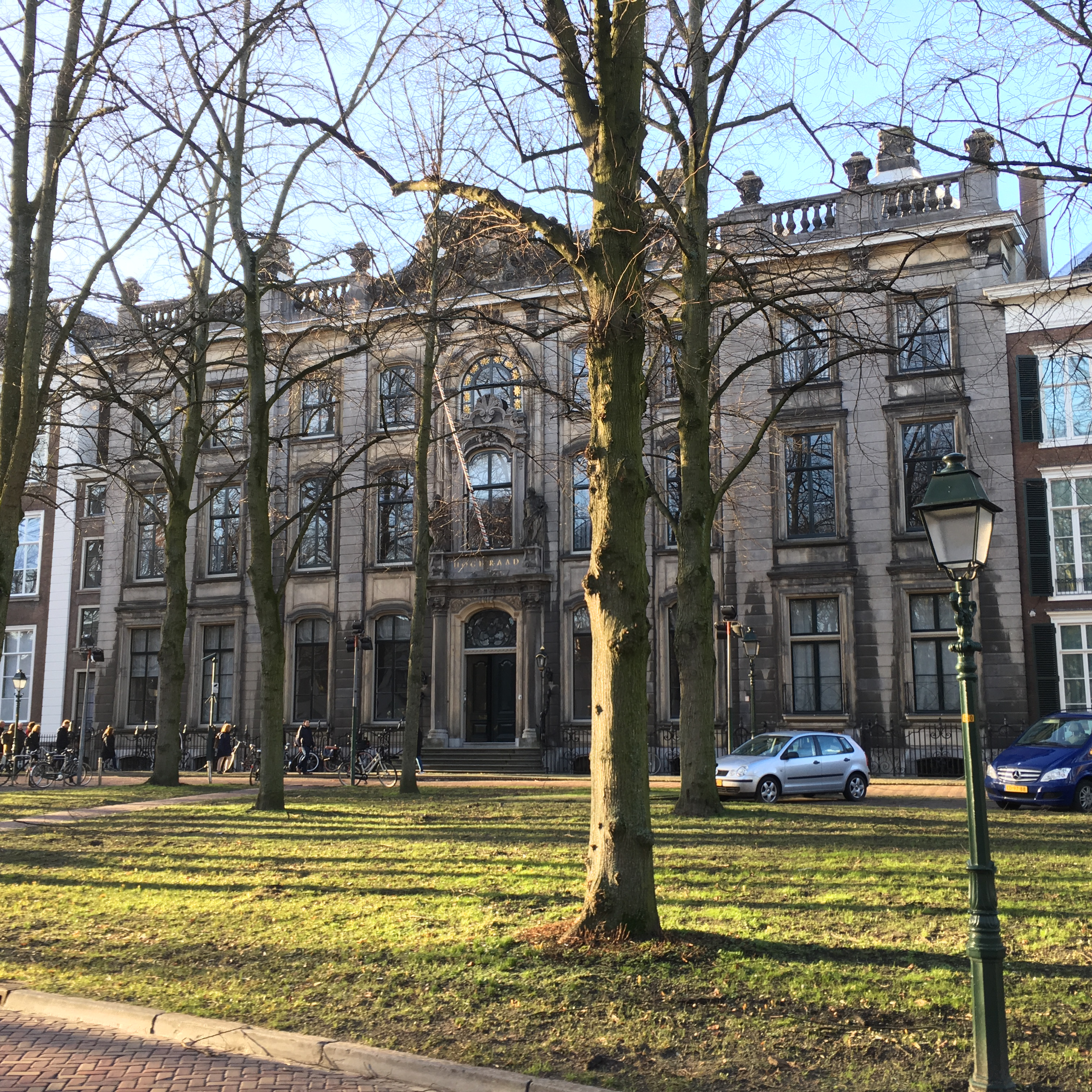
Huis Huguetan, where the Senate and the Council of State are housed during the renovation.

The Senate and the Council of State are temporarily housed in Huis Huguetan, the former building of the Supreme Court of the Netherlands.

=== Ministry of General Affairs ===
The plan was to temporarily house the Ministry of General Affairs on the Catshuis grounds. For the two hundred civil servants, the plan was to place a prefabricated temporary office opposite the Catshuis. The construction led to an uproar among local residents, as they felt it did not fit with the monumental Catshuis and the protected Sorghvliet park. In the summer of 2021, the Hague municipal council also opposed the plans.

Subsequently, it was decided to move the ministry to a government office complex at Bezuidenhoutseweg 73, where the ministries of Economic Affairs, Agriculture, Fisheries, Food Security and Nature and Climate and Green Growth are also housed. While this building would be prepared, most of the ministry would housed in 2024 at the JuBi-building, where the ministries of Justice and Interior are housed. For security reasons, Prime Minister Dick Schoof had wanted to stay in his office at the Binnenhof all 2024 until the complex at Bezuidenhoutseweg 73 was ready, but The Hague municipal council refused this request because of fire safety.
