= Wim de Kort =

Dutch politician (1909-1993)

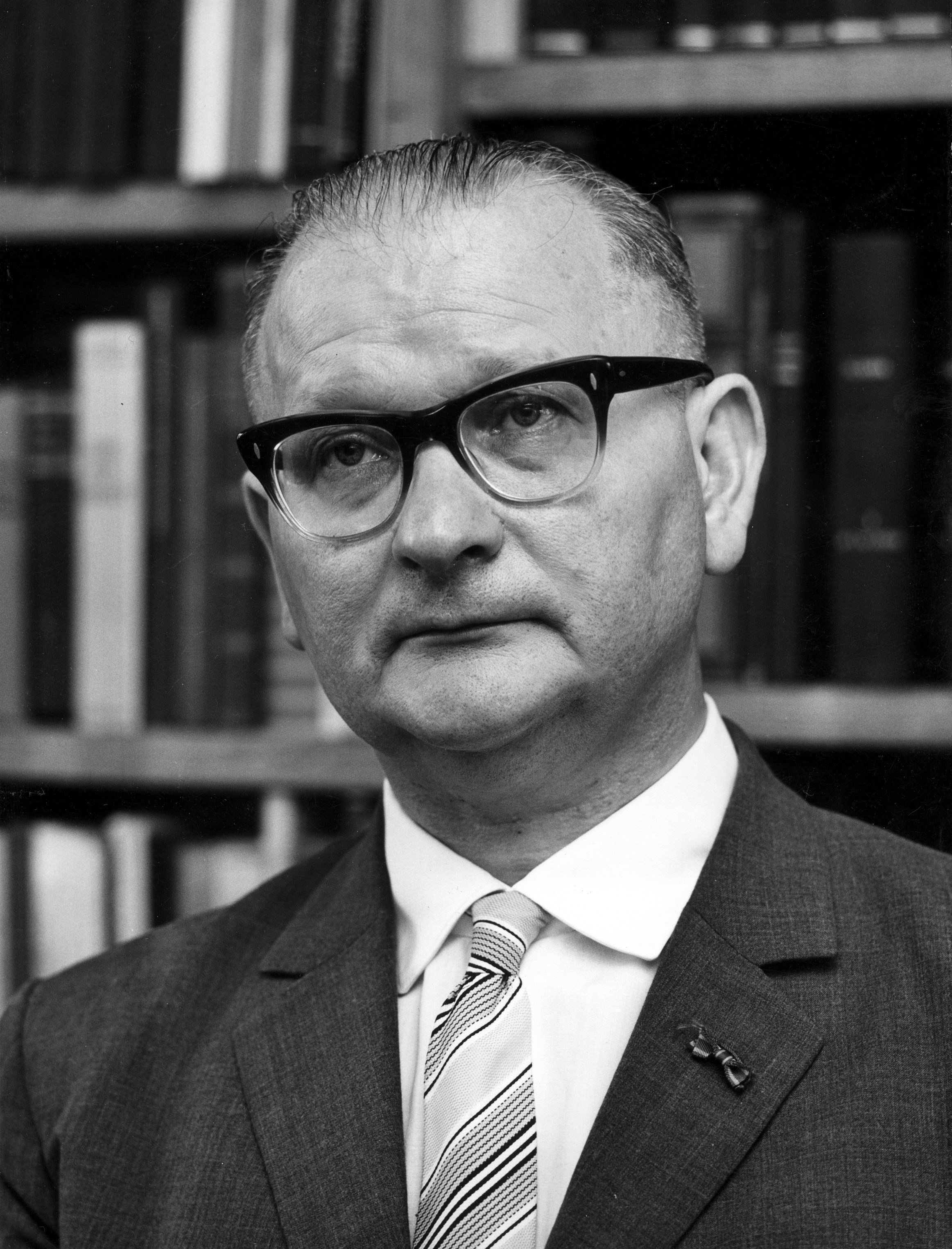
- Wim de Kort in 1961

Member of the House of Representatives
- In office 20 November 1945 – 15 July 1952
- In office 10 December 1952 – 13 October 1966

Personal details
- Born: Willebrordus Leonardus Petrus Martinus de Kort; 4 June 1909 Tilburg, Netherlands
- Died: 2 May 1993 (aged 83) Villeneuve-de-Berg, France
- Party: KVP
- Spouse: Jeanne Emelie Beljaars Damen (m. 1939)
- Children: 9
- Education: Catholic University of Leuven

Willebrordus Leonardus Petrus Martinus "Wim" de Kort (4 June 1909 – 2 May 1993) was a Dutch politician. From 1945 to 1966, he was a member of the House of Representatives for the Catholic People's Party (KVP), serving as the KVP's parliamentary leader from 1961 to 1963.

== Early life ==
Wim de Kort was born on 4 June 1909 in Tilburg to Henricus Antonius de Kort and Anna Cornelia Henrica van Hest. He attended the Catholic University of Leuven, obtaining a degree in political and social sciences in 1936 and a doctorate in 1940.

During World War II, De Kort was employed at an employment office in Tilburg, where despite personal misgivings against working for NSB he remained in office at the urging of cardinal Johannes de Jong. In this position, he maintained contacts with the Dutch resistance, and was able to prevent dozens of men from forced labour in Germany through issuing false medical diagnoses. He was eventually caught and forced to go into hiding in a monastery. Following the liberation of North Brabant by the Allies, De Kort joined an organisation of former resistance fighters, and participated in purges of Nazi collaborators in local government.

== Political career ==
In 1945, De Kort was appointed to the House of Representatives, and was first elected as an MP in the 1946 Dutch general election. As an MP, De Kort focused primarily on social affairs, and matters relating to Suriname and the Netherlands Antilles. Despite being characterized as belonging to the conservative wing of the KVP, De Kort was a strong supporter of the welfare state, becoming an advocate for child benefits and expanded social insurance legislation. He also served in the North Brabant provincial council from 1950 to 1957, and as mayor of the municipality of Nieuw-Ginneken from 1960 to 1974.

In August 1961, he succeeded Carl Romme as the KVP's parliamentary leader, after the two most likely candidates, Jo Cals and Norbert Schmelzer, had both left the House of Representatives to join the De Quay cabinet. Due to this, he became known as a "tussenpaus" (placeholder figure), meant to lead the party until a more fitting figure became available. He was known as a less strict leader than his predecessor, through which he sought to reconcile the party's left and right wings.

Following the 1963 Dutch general election, De Kort was appointed on 6 June 1963 as formateur with the task of forming a new government, over the objections of other prominent KVP members, on the condition that he could not become prime minister. Carl Romme, who had been informateur before De Kort's appointment as formateur, had proposed the formation of a five-party cabinet consisting of the three Christian Democratic parties (KVP, the Christian Historical Union, and the Anti-Revolutionary Party), the Labour Party (PvdA), and the People's Party for Freedom and Democracy (VVD), but under pressure from VVD leader Edzo Toxopeus who refused to govern with the PvdA De Kort was soon forced to choose between the two parties. Despite De Kort preferring cooperation with the VVD in private, he publicly continued to hold out the possibility of forming a government with the PvdA as well.

On 24 June, De Kort, publicly announced his intention to form a government with the VVD over the PvdA on "programmatic grounds". De Kort faced criticism both from the blindsided PvdA leader Anne Vondeling, who had been open to compromise, and would later describe the process as "the craziest cabinet formation of all time". At a parliamentary party meeting on 25 June 12 out of 26 KVP MPs called on him to step down. On 26 June, after the VVD threatened to pull out of government negotiations over the proposed socio-economic policy which it saw as too leftist, De Kort stepped down as formateur. In a report concerning the formation, De Kort blamed both the PvdA's demand for financing government pensions out of general taxation and the VVD's "generally negative attitude" towards the government's plans. He was succeeded as formateur by Louis Beel, who would form a new government with the VVD led bij Victor Marijnen.

De Kort resigned as parliamentary leader on 14 December 1963 following mounting pressure from within the KVP after his failures as formateur, and was succeeded by Norbert Schmelzer. He remained in office until 14 October 1966, when he left office coincidentally on the day after the Night of Schmelzer, which led to the fall of the Cals cabinet.

== Later life ==
After his resignation as MP, De Kort became a member of the board of various organisations, including the Social and Economic Council and Pensioenfonds Katholieke Instellingen (later renamed to PGGM), a Catholic pension fund. In 1976, De Kort was forced to resign from the PGGM board after it had lost millions on an investment project in the Ardèche department in France, and De Kort had reportedly used funds from the project to build a villa. An independent investigation later found no grounds for prosecution, but the scandal led to the KVP further distancing itself from De Kort. He increasingly spent more time in Southern France following this period.

Wim de Kort died on 2 May 1993 in Villeneuve-de-Berg.

== Bibliography ==
- van der Heiden, P. B.; van Kessel, A. C. M. W. (2010). Rondom de Nacht van Schmelzer. De kabinetten-Marijnen, -Cals en -Zijlstra 1963-1967. Amsterdam: Boom. ISBN 978-94-6105-362-6.
