= Zijlstra cabinet =

Dutch cabinet, 1966 to 1967

- Cabinet of the Netherlands

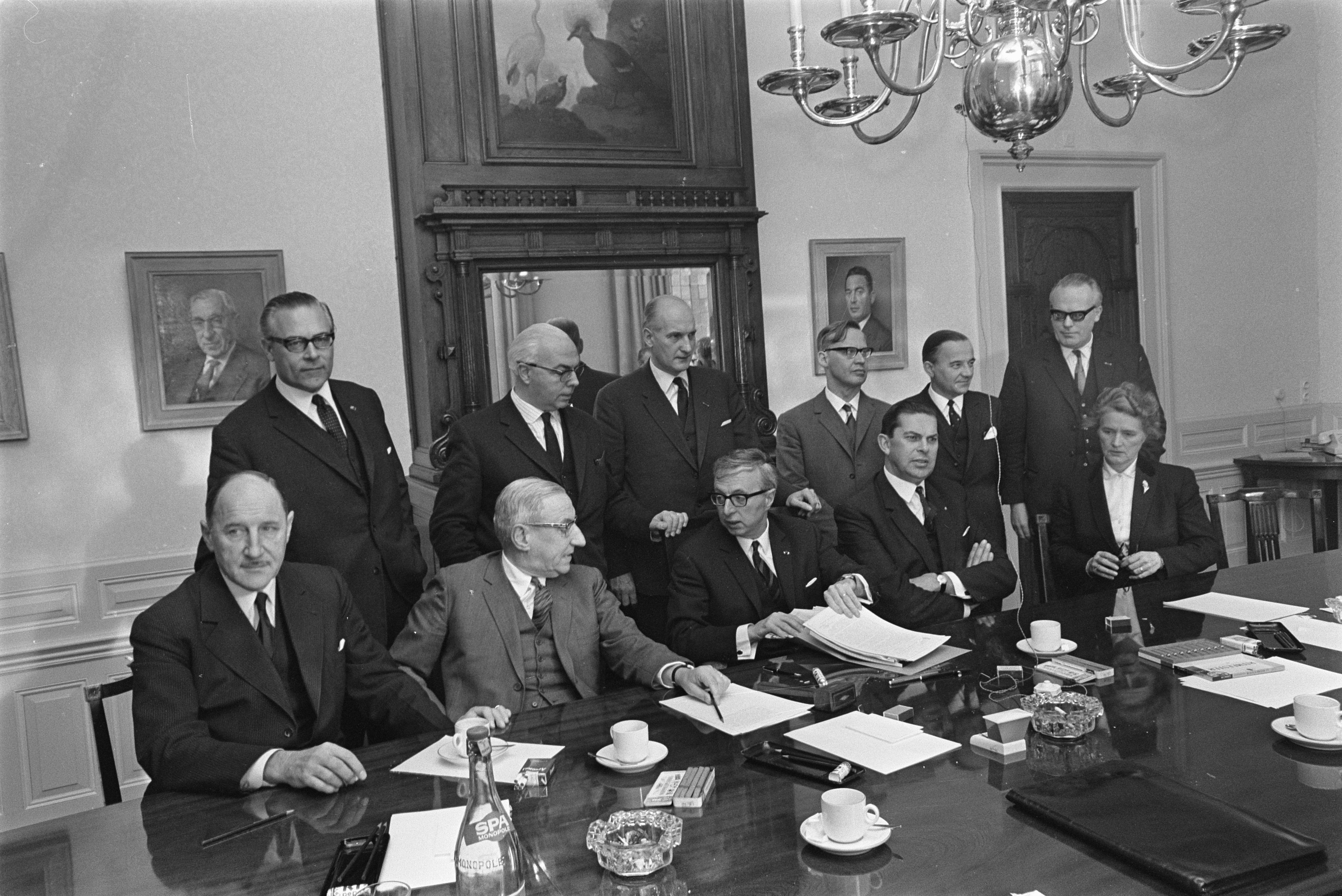
- The first meeting of the incoming Zijlstra cabinet on 21 November 1966
- Date formed: 22 November 1966
- Date dissolved: 5 April 1967; 134 days in office (Demissionary from 15 February 1967)

People and organisations
- Monarch: Queen Juliana
- Prime Minister: Jelle Zijlstra
- Deputy Prime Minister: Jan de Quay; Barend Biesheuvel
- No. of ministers: 13
- Member party: Catholic People's Party (KVP); Anti-Revolutionary Party (ARP)
- Status in legislature: Centrist; Minority government (Caretaker/Rump)

History
- Incoming formation: 1966 formation
- Outgoing formation: 1967 formation
- Outgoing election: 1967 election
- Legislature terms: 1963–1967
- Predecessor: Cals cabinet
- Successor: De Jong cabinet

The Zijlstra cabinet was the executive branch of the Dutch Government from 22 November 1966 until 5 April 1967. The cabinet was formed by the christian-democratic Catholic People's Party (KVP) and the Anti-Revolutionary Party (ARP) after the fall of the previous Cabinet Cals. The caretaker rump cabinet was a centrist coalition and had a minority in the House of Representatives with former Protestant Leader Jelle Zijlstra a former Minister of Finance serving as Prime Minister and dual served as Minister of Finance. Former Catholic Prime Minister Jan de Quay served as Deputy Prime Minister and Minister of Transport and Water Management, Protestant Leader Barend Biesheuvel continued as Deputy Prime Minister, Minister of Agriculture and Fisheries and the responsibility for Suriname and Netherlands Antilles Affairs from previous cabinet.

The cabinet served in the middle of the tumultuous 1960s, domestically it had to deal with the counterculture and its primary objective was to make preparations for a snap election in 1967. Following the election the cabinet continued in a demissionary capacity until it was replaced by the De Jong cabinet.

== Formation ==
Following the fall of the Cals cabinet the Labour Party (PvdA) left the coalition and the Catholic People's Party and the Anti-Revolutionary Party formed a Rump cabinet.

== Term ==
Such a transitional cabinet is not supposed to take important decisions, but it still resolved the issue over the introduction of commercial television, which had been a major issue in the two previous cabinets, with the omroepwet, which allowed commercial blocks on public television (between shows), despite protests by VVD and part of Christian Historical Union.

== Cabinet members ==
Ministers		Title/Ministry/Portfolio(s)			Term of office	Party
Jelle Zijlstra	Dr. Jelle Zijlstra (1918–2001)	Prime Minister	General Affairs		22 November 1966 – 5 April 1967	Anti-Revolutionary; Party
Jelle Zijlstra	Dr. Jelle Zijlstra (1918–2001)	Minister	Finance		22 November 1966 – 5 April 1967	Anti-Revolutionary; Party
Jan de Quay	Dr. Jan de Quay (1901–1985)	Deputy; Prime Minister	Transport and Water Management		22 November 1966 – 5 April 1967	Catholic; People's Party
Jan de Quay	Dr. Jan de Quay (1901–1985)	Minister	Transport and Water Management		22 November 1966 – 5 April 1967	Catholic; People's Party
Barend Biesheuvel	Barend Biesheuvel (1920–2001)	Deputy; Prime Minister	Agriculture and Fisheries		24 July 1963 – 5 April 1967^{[Retained]}	Anti-Revolutionary; Party
Barend Biesheuvel	Barend Biesheuvel (1920–2001)	Minister	Agriculture and Fisheries		24 July 1963 – 5 April 1967^{[Retained]}	Anti-Revolutionary; Party
Barend Biesheuvel	Barend Biesheuvel (1920–2001)	Minister	Interior	• Suriname and Netherlands; Antilles Affairs	24 July 1963 – 5 April 1967^{[Retained]}	Anti-Revolutionary; Party
Koos Verdam	Dr. Koos Verdam (1915–1998)	Minister	Interior		5 September 1966 – 5 April 1967^{[Retained]}	Anti-Revolutionary; Party
Joseph Luns	Joseph Luns (1911–2002)	Minister	Foreign Affairs		13 October 1956 – 6 July 1971^{[Retained]}	Catholic; People's Party
Teun Struycken	Teun Struycken (1906–1977)	Minister	Justice		22 November 1966 – 5 April 1967	Catholic; People's Party
Joop Bakker	Joop Bakker (1921–2003)	Minister	Economic Affairs		22 November 1966 – 5 April 1967	Anti-Revolutionary; Party
Piet de Jong	Captain; Piet de Jong (1915–2016)	Minister	Defence		24 July 1963 – 5 April 1967^{[Retained]}	Catholic; People's Party
Gerard Veldkamp	Dr. Gerard Veldkamp (1921–1990)	Minister	Social Affairs and Health		17 July 1961 – 5 April 1967^{[Retained]}	Catholic; People's Party
Isaäc Arend Diepenhorst	Dr. Isaäc Arend; Diepenhorst (1916–2004)	Minister	Education and Sciences		14 April 1965 – 5 April 1967^{[Retained]}	Anti-Revolutionary; Party
Herman Witte	Herman Witte (1909–1973)	Minister	Housing and Spatial Planning		22 November 1966 – 5 April 1967	Catholic; People's Party
Marga Klompé	Dr. Marga Klompé (1912–1986)	Minister	Culture, Recreation and Social Work		22 November 1966 – 6 July 1971^{[Continued]}	Catholic; People's Party
Minister without portfolio		Title/Ministry/Portfolio(s)			Term of office	Party
Theo Bot	Theo Bot (1911–1984)	Minister	Foreign Affairs	• Development; Cooperation	14 April 1965 – 5 April 1967^{[Retained]}	Catholic; People's Party
State Secretaries		Title/Ministry/Portfolio(s)			Term of office	Party
Leo de Block	Leo de Block (1904–1988)	State Secretary	Foreign Affairs)	• European Union • Benelux	3 September 1963 – 5 April 1967^{[Retained]}	Catholic; People's Party
Leo de Block	Leo de Block (1904–1988)	State Secretary	Transport and Water Management	• Public; Transport • Rail Transport • Weather; Forecasting	28 November 1966 – 5 April 1967	Catholic; People's Party
Louis van Son	Louis van Son (1922–1986)	State Secretary	Economic Affairs	• Small and Medium-sized; Businesses • Regional; Development	28 November 1966 – 6 July 1971^{[Continued]}	Catholic; People's Party
Gerard Peijnenburg	Gerard; Peijnenburg (1919–2000)	State Secretary	Defence	• Army	13 May 1965 – 5 April 1967^{[Retained]}	Independent; Christian Democratic; Catholic
Adri van Es	Vice admiral Adri van Es (1913–1994)	State Secretary	Defence	• Navy	14 August 1963 – 16 September 1972^{[Retained]} ^{[Continued]}	Anti-Revolutionary; Party
Heije Schaper	Lieutenant general Heije Schaper (1906–1996)	State Secretary	Defence	• Air Force	22 June 1966 – 5 April 1967^{[Retained]}	Independent; Conservative Liberal
Louis Bartels	Dr. Louis Bartels (1915–2002)	State Secretary	Social Affairs and Health	• Primary; Healthcare • Elderly Care • Disability Policy • Medical Ethics	3 September 1963 – 5 April 1967^{[Retained]}	Catholic; People's Party
José de Meijer	Dr. José de Meijer (1915–2000)	State Secretary	Social Affairs and Health	• Occupational; Safety • Public; Organisations	15 November 1963 – 5 April 1967^{[Retained]}	Catholic; People's Party
Hans Grosheide	Hans Grosheide (1930–2022)	State Secretary	Education and Sciences	• Primary; Education • Secondary; Education • Special; Education	3 September 1963 – 6 July 1971^{[Retained]} ^{[Continued]}	Anti-Revolutionary; Party

^{Retained from the previous cabinet}
^{Continued in the next cabinet}
