= Polarisation strategy =

Political strategy

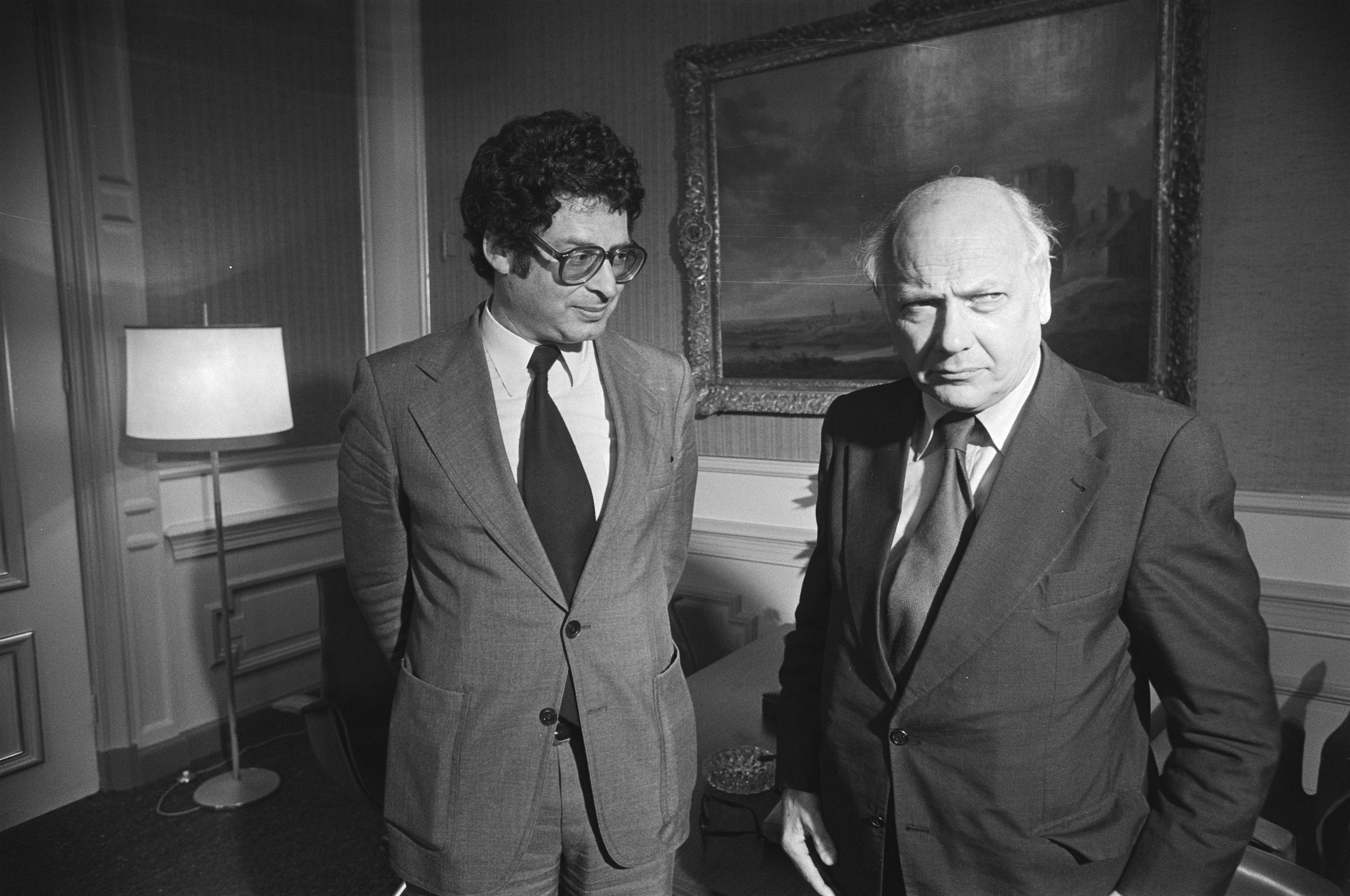
Ed van Thijn as a negotiator with PvdA party leader and informateur Joop den Uyl during the 1977 Dutch cabinet formation.

The polarisation strategy was a political strategy in the Netherlands used by the Labour Party (PvdA) from 1966 to the 1980s. With this strategy, the party aimed to emphasise the differences with the confessional parties, particularly the Catholic People's Party (KVP) and its successor Christian Democratic Appeal (CDA). By highlighting these differences, the party attempted to create a division in Dutch politics based on conservative versus progressive lines. The intellectual father of the strategy was Ed van Thijn.

== Characteristics ==
According to political scientist Philip van Praag, the polarisation strategy had three characteristics:

1. Splitting the Dutch electorate into progressive versus conservative
2. A self-sufficient progressive majority
3. Forming coalitions prior to the elections to create clarity for the cabinet formation

== Development ==
The polarisation strategy was a renewal of the breakthrough idea that the PvdA had embraced since World War II, aimed at breaking through political pillarisation. The desire for polarisation was strengthened by the rise of New Left within the PvdA and Democrats 66. The Night of Schmelzer in 1966 and the subsequent fall of the Cals cabinet are considered the starting points of the polarisation strategy. From that moment, the PvdA wanted to distance itself from the KVP, which they saw as unreliable because they used their centre position to govern alternately with the left and right.

In the run-up to the 1972 general election, the PvdA entered into a progressive alliance with D'66 and the Political Party of Radicals (PPR) with the election program Keerpunt 1972. During the 1972-73 cabinet formation, the progressive parties managed to play the confessional parties against each other to form a progressive minority cabinet, with the tacit support of the confessional Anti-Revolutionary Party (ARP) and KVP. This was seen as a success of the polarisation strategy.

During the 1977 cabinet formation, the PvdA again employed the strategy in negotiations with the CDA. After nearly half a year, the negotiations failed, and the CDA formed the first Van Agt cabinet with the People's Party for Freedom and Democracy (VVD). Van Praag marked this formation as the definitive failure of the polarisation strategy.

In 1984, PvdA party leader Joop den Uyl concluded that "the polarisation strategy has largely failed," although the party continued to use it at the time.

== Sources ==
- Van Baalen, Carla; Bos, Anne (2022). Grote idealen, smalle marges (in Dutch). Boom. ISBN 978-90-244-4399-4.
