= Ministry of General Affairs =

Government ministry of the Netherlands

- Dutch: Ministerie van Algemene Zaken
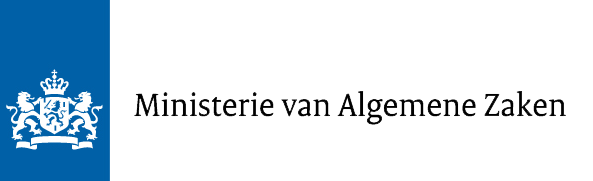
- Logo of the Ministry of General Affairs

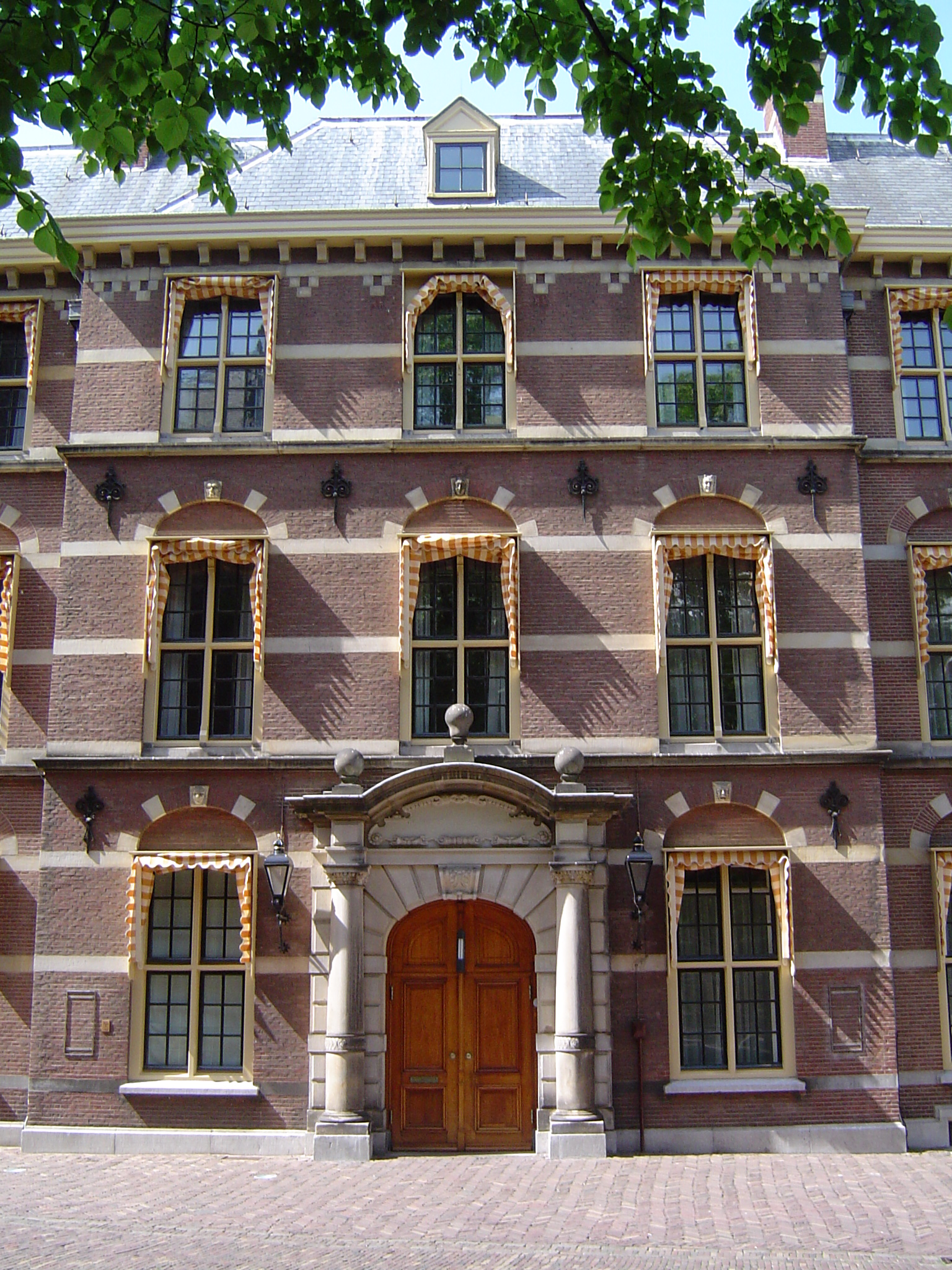
- Building of the Ministry of General Affairs

Department overview
- Formed: 3 July 1937; 89 years ago
- Jurisdiction: Kingdom of the Netherlands
- Headquarters: Binnenhof 19, The Hague, Netherlands (closed due to ongoing renovations) Bezuidenhoutseweg 73, The Hague, Netherlands (temporary)
- Employees: 400
- Annual budget: €1.4 million (2018)
- Minister responsible: Rob Jetten, Minister of General Affairs
- Department executive: Paul Huijts, Secretary-General
- Website: Ministry of General Affairs

The Ministry of General Affairs (Dutch: Ministerie van Algemene Zaken; AZ) is the Dutch Ministry responsible for government policy, planning, information, and the Dutch royal house. The Ministry was created in 1937 and dissolved in 1945, but in 1947 it was reinstated by Prime Minister Louis Beel. The Ministry remained small until 1967, when it was greatly expanded by Prime Minister Piet de Jong. Since his premiership the Ministry has continued to expand to the present day. The Minister of General Affairs (Dutch: Minister van Algemene Zaken) is the head of the Ministry who is also Prime Minister and a member of the Cabinet of the Netherlands. The current Minister and Prime Minister is Rob Jetten.

The Ministry is comparable to the German Chancellery, the British Cabinet Office, or the U.S. Executive Office of the President, but its designation as a Ministry emphasises the role of Prime Minister of the Netherlands as primus inter pares among the ministers of the government.

The Ministry has three responsibilities: coordination of government policy, the Dutch Royal House, and government communications about the royal house and government policy. The Ministry also houses the Secretariat of the Cabinet of the Netherlands.

The main offices of the Ministry are located in the Binnenhof, the political centre of the Netherlands. However, starting summer of 2024, due to the renovation of the Binnenhof, the Ministry will be moved temporarily; first to the building of the Ministry of the Interior and Kingdom Relations until December 2024, and then to the buildings of the Ministry of Economic Affairs until the renovation of the Binnenhof is complete. With only about 400 employees, it is by far the smallest Ministry in the Netherlands.

== Organisation ==
The Ministry has currently four Government Agencies and two Directorates:

Government		Responsibilities
Government Information Service (Dutch: Rijksvoorlichtingsdienst)	RVD	Information
Scientific Council for Government Policy (Dutch: Wetenschappelijke Raad voor het Regeringsbeleid)	WRR	Think tank
Office of the Prime Minister (Dutch: Kabinet van de Minister-President)	KMP	Government policy • Planning
Public Information and Communications Service (Dutch: Dienst Publiek en Communicatie)	DPC	Communication

- Directorate for Royal House Division (CKH)
- Oversight Commission for the Intelligence Services (CTIVD)

== State Secretary for General Affairs ==
There has been one State Secretary for the Ministry of General Affairs. Norbert Schmelzer served as State Secretary for General Affairs in the De Quay cabinet from 19 May 1959 until 24 July 1963.

State Secretary for General Affairs		Portfolio	Term of office	Party	Prime Minister (Cabinet)
Norbert Schmelzer	Norbert Schmelzer (1921–2008)	• Privatization Policy • Government Real Estate • Public Sector Organisations	19 May 1959 – 24 July 1963	Catholic People's Party	Jan de Quay (De Quay)

== See also ==
- List of prime ministers of the Netherlands
- Cabinet department
