= Rump cabinet =

A rump cabinet is a cabinet from which one or more coalition partners have withdrawn and which has minority support in parliament.

== Netherlands ==
In the Netherlands a rump cabinet is not the same as a demissionary cabinet where the entire cabinet resigns and the full existing coalition runs the country until a new cabinet takes power after elections have been held.

With a demissionary cabinet parliament decides which issues are controversial, which bars the cabinet from drafting legislation concerning them.

A rump cabinet can take care of such issues but it does not have a majority in parliament and thus needs approval by opposition parties, which make it likely that the rump parliament will take great care dealing with controversial issues.

Generally the rump cabinet will only take care of going government concerns (as a caretaker cabinet) as well as preparing for elections.

For the formation of a rump cabinet the Monarch will appoint an informateur and later a formateur, just like with a regular cabinet formation after elections.

=== Rump cabinets in the Netherlands ===
- Second Beel cabinet 1958-1959
  (after the fall of Second Drees cabinet)
- Zijlstra cabinet 1966-1967
  (after the fall of Cals cabinet)
- Second Biesheuvel cabinet 1972-1973
  (DS'70 leaves the cabinet)
- Third Van Agt cabinet 1982
  (PvdA leaves the cabinet)
- Third Balkenende cabinet 2006
  (D66 leaves the cabinet)
