= Bé Udink =

Dutch politician and diplomat

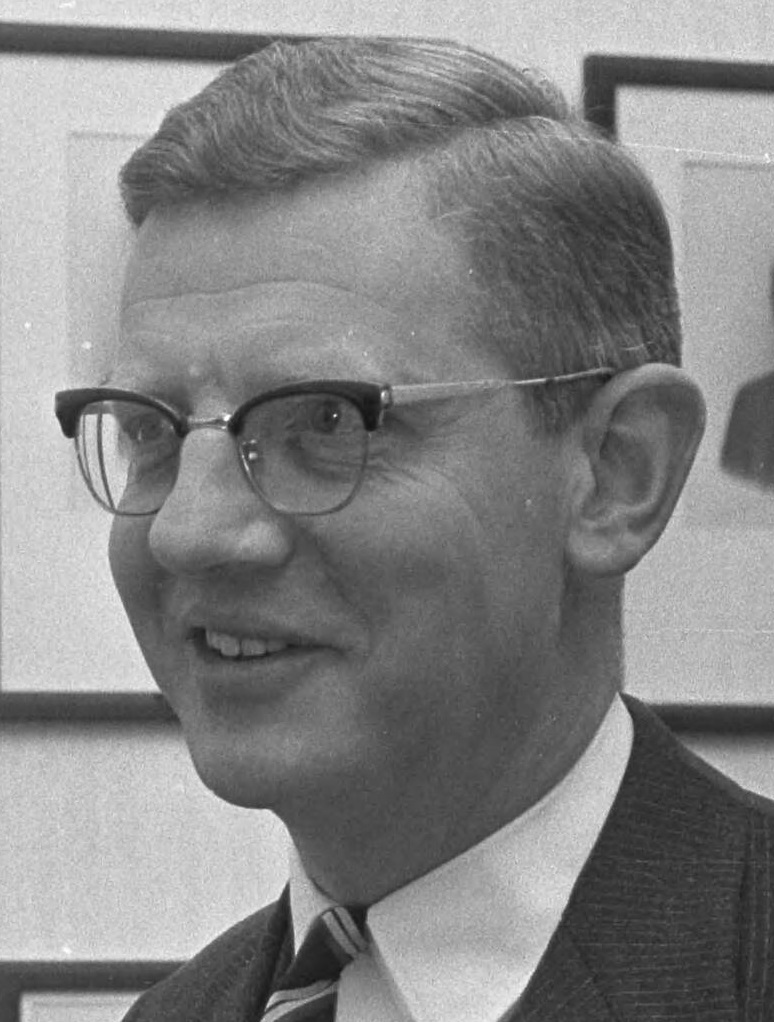
- Udink in 1967

Minister of Transport and Water Management
- In office 21 July 1972 – 11 May 1973
- Prime Minister: Barend Biesheuvel
- Preceded by: Willem Drees Jr.
- Succeeded by: Tjerk Westerterp

Minister of Housing and Spatial Planning
- In office 6 July 1971 – 11 May 1973
- Prime Minister: Barend Biesheuvel
- Preceded by: Wim Schut
- Succeeded by: Hans Gruijters

Parliamentary leader in the House of Representatives
- In office 11 May 1971 – 6 July 1971
- Preceded by: Jur Mellema
- Succeeded by: Roelof Kruisinga
- Parliamentary group: Christian Historical Union

Member of the House of Representatives
- In office 11 May 1971 – 6 July 1971

Leader of the Christian Historical Union
- In office 20 June 1970 – 28 July 1971
- Preceded by: Jur Mellema
- Succeeded by: Jur Mellema

Minister for Aid to Developing Countries
- In office 5 April 1967 – 6 July 1971
- Prime Minister: Piet de Jong
- Preceded by: Theo Bot
- Succeeded by: Kees Boertien as Minister for Development Cooperation

Personal details
- Born: Berend Jan Udink; 12 February 1926 Deventer, Netherlands
- Died: 24 May 2016 (aged 90) Goedereede, Netherlands
- Party: Christian Democratic Appeal (from 1980)
- Other political affiliations: Christian Historical Union (until 1980)
- Spouse: Anneke van Drumpt (m. 1949)
- Children: Marc Udink (born 1952); 2 other children
- Education: Rotterdam School of Economics (Bachelor of Economics, Master of Economics); University of Lausanne (Bachelor of Accountancy)
- Occupation: Politician · Diplomat · Economist · Businessman · Corporate director · Nonprofit director · Lobbyist · Professor

Berend Jan "Bé" Udink (12 February 1926 – 24 May 2016) was a Dutch politician and diplomat of the Christian Historical Union (CHU) and businessman.

Udink applied at the Rotterdam School of Economics in July 1946 majoring in Economics and obtaining a Bachelor of Economics degree in June 1948 before graduating with a Master of Economics degree in June 1952. Udink also applied at the University of Lausanne in August 1946 for a Class in Financial economics obtaining a Bachelor of Accountancy degree in September 1947. Udink worked as a corporate director of the chamber of commerce of Rotterdam from October 1953 until July 1962. Udink also worked as an associate professor of Trade economics at the Rotterdam School of Economics from June 1959 until September 1964. Udink worked as corporate director of the chamber of commerce of The Hague from July 1962 until April 1967 serving as executive director from January 1963 until April 1967. Udink served on the Rijnmond Council from September 1965 until April 1967.

After the 1967 general election Udink was appointed as Minister for Aid to Developing Countries in the De Jong cabinet, taking office on 5 April 1967. After the Leader of the Christian Historical Union and parliamentary leader in the House of Representatives Jur Mellema unexpectedly announced that he was stepping down, the party leadership approached Udink as his successor, Udink accepted and became the leader of the Christian Historical Union and lead candidate for the 1971 general election on 20 June 1970. The Christian Historical Union suffered a small loss, losing 3 seats and now had 7 seats in the House of Representatives. Udink was elected to the House of Representatives and became the parliamentary leader, taking office on 11 May 1971. The following 1971 cabinet formation resulted in a coalition agreement between the Christian Historical Union, the Catholic People's Party (KVP), the People's Party for Freedom and Democracy (VVD), the Anti-Revolutionary Party (ARP) and the Democratic Socialists '70 (DS'70) which formed the Biesheuvel I cabinet with Udink appointed as Minister of Housing and Spatial Planning, taking office on 6 July 1971. On 28 July 1971 Udink announced that he was stepping down as leader in favor of parliamentary leader and predecessor Mellema. The cabinet fell just one year later on 19 July 1972 and continued to serve in a demissionary capacity with Udink taking over as Minister of Transport and Water Management on 21 July 1972 until it was replaced by the caretaker Biesheuvel II cabinet with Udink continuing as Minister of Housing and Spatial Planning and Minister of Transport and Water Management, taking office on 9 August 1972. In September 1972 Udink announced his retirement from national politics and that he would not stand for the 1972 general election. The cabinet was replaced by the Den Uyl cabinet following the 1972-1973 cabinet formation on 11 May 1973.

Udink retired from national politics and became active in the private sector, in August 1973 Udink was appointed as chief financial officer (CFO) and vice chairman of the board of directors of the Overseas Gas and Electric Company (OGEM) from 1 September 1973 until 1 January 1978. In December 1977 Udink was nominated as chief executive officer (CEO) and chairman of the board of directors of OGEM working from 1 January 1978 until 1 March 1980.

Udink remained active in the private sector and public sector and occupied numerous seats as a corporate director and nonprofit director on several boards of directors and supervisory boards (Zilveren Kruis, Transnational Institute, Radio Netherlands Worldwide, Energy Research Centre, IKEA Foundation and Terre des hommes) and served on several state commissions and councils on behalf of the government (Public Pension Funds APB, Staatsbosbeheer, Raad voor Cultuur, Cadastre Agency and the Advisory Council for Spatial Planning) and served as a diplomat and lobbyist for several economic delegations on behalf of the government.

Udink was known for his abilities as a negotiator and debater. Udink continued to comment on political affairs until his death at the age of 90.

== Biography ==
=== Early life ===
Berend Jan Udink was born on 12 February 1926 in Deventer in the province of Overijssel in a Remonstrant family. Udink studied economy in Rotterdam and Lausanne (1945–1952). After his studied he was employed at the Chamber of Commerce of Rotterdam and later worked as a teacher at the Economische Hogeschool Rotterdam (Economic College of Rotterdam). Udink, who belonged to the Christian Historical Union, was elected in the so-called Rijnmondraad (Council of Rijnmond), a local council of representatives of Rijnmond, in 1965.

=== Politics ===
Two years later, in 1967, he became minister for Development Cooperation in the De Jong cabinet, a post he held till 1971. In 1971 he was lead candidate of the CHU, presenting himself as a conservative and a "law and order" politician. In that same year Udink became minister of Transport, Public Works and Water Management in the Biesheuvel I and II cabinets. His political career ended in 1973. From 1973 until 1978 he was member of the Board of Directors of the Overzeese Gas- en Elektriciteitsmaatschappij N.V. (as Dutch gas and electricity company) and from 1978 till 1980 he served as its president.

== Personal ==
Bé Udink was married and had three children. He belonged to the Remonstrant Brotherhood (Arminian Protestant Church).

On March 23, 1977 he was briefly held in custody in New York City after having jokingly told a flight attendant on a commercial jet aircraft he had just boarded at New York's LaGuardia Airport that he was carrying a bomb. Then-First Lady Rosalynn Carter at the time was aboard the plane. The 'bomb' was later discovered to have been a vase and Udink was subsequently ordered to pay a $1,000 fine.

== Decorations ==
Honours
Ribbon bar	Honour	Country	Date	Comment
	Grand Officer of the Order of Leopold II	Belgium	10 October 1969	
	Knight Commander of the Order of Merit	Germany	1 February 1972	
	Commander of the Order of Orange-Nassau	Netherlands	8 June 1973	

Party political offices
Preceded by Jur Mellema	Leader of the Christian; Historical Union; 1970–1971	Succeeded by Jur Mellema
Preceded by Henk Beernink; 1967	Lead candidate of the Christian Historical Union; 1971	Succeeded by Arnold Tilanus; 1972
Preceded by Jur Mellema	Parliamentary leader of the Christian Historical Union in the House of Representatives; 1971	Succeeded by Roelof Kruisinga
Political offices
Preceded by Theo Bot	Minister for Aid to Developing Countries; 1967–1971	Succeeded by Kees Boertien as Minister for Development Cooperation
Preceded by Wim Schut	Minister of Housing and Spatial Planning; 1971–1973	Succeeded by Hans Gruijters
Preceded by Willem Drees Jr.	Minister of Transport and Water Management; 1972–1973	Succeeded by Tjerk Westerterp
Business positions
Unknown	CFO and Vice Chairman of the Board of directors of the Overseas Gas and Electric Company; 1973–1978	Succeeded by Lenze Koopmans
Preceded by Karel Fibbe	CEO and Chairman of the Board of directors of the Overseas Gas and Electric Company; 1978–1980	Succeeded by Lenze Koopmans
