= Henk Beernink =

Dutch politician (1910–1979)

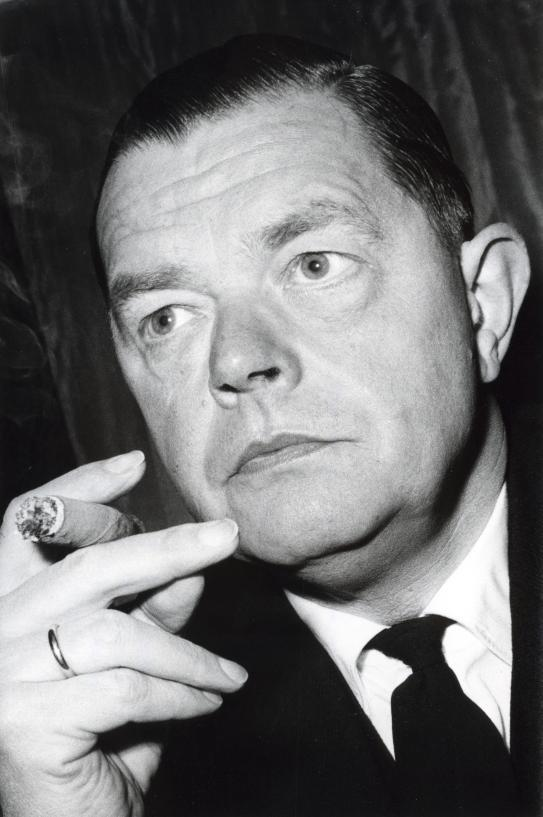
- Henk Beernink in 1969

Minister of the Interior
- In office 5 April 1967 – 6 July 1971
- Prime Minister: Piet de Jong
- Preceded by: Koos Verdam
- Succeeded by: Molly Geertsema

Parliamentary leader in the House of Representatives
- In office 16 May 1963 – 5 April 1967
- Preceded by: Hendrik Tilanus
- Succeeded by: Jur Mellema
- Parliamentary group: Christian Historical Union

Leader of the Christian Historical Union
- In office 20 February 1963 – 12 April 1967
- Preceded by: Hendrik Tilanus
- Succeeded by: Jur Mellema

Chairman of the Christian Historical Union
- In office 9 July 1958 – 19 March 1966
- Leader: Hendrik Tilanus (1958–1963); Himself (1963–1966)
- Preceded by: Hendrik Tilanus
- Succeeded by: Arnold Tilanus

Member of the House of Representatives
- In office 4 June 1946 – 5 April 1967
- Parliamentary group: Christian Historical Union

Personal details
- Born: Hendrik Karel Jan Beernink; 2 February 1910 Maarssen, Netherlands
- Died: 22 August 1979 (aged 69) Rijswijk, Netherlands
- Party: Christian Historical Union (from 1932)
- Spouse: Bartha Peeze (m. 1939; died 1974)
- Education: Utrecht University (Bachelor of Laws, Master of Laws)
- Occupation: Politician · Civil servant · Jurist · Nonprofit director

Hendrik Karel Jan "Henk" Beernink (2 February 1910 – 22 August 1979) was a Dutch jurist and politician of the defunct Christian Historical Union (CHU) party now merged into the Christian Democratic Appeal (CDA) party.

== Biography ==
Beernink attended a Gymnasium in Dordrecht from April 1922 until May 1928 and applied at the Utrecht University in June 1928 majoring in Law and obtaining a Bachelor of Laws degree in October 1929 and graduating with a Master of Laws degree in December 1932. Beernink worked as a civil servant for the municipality of Papendrecht from December 1932 until February 1939 and for the municipality of Rijswijk from February 1939 until April 1967 and as Municipal clerk from June 1945 until April 1967.

Beernink was elected as a Member of the House of Representatives after the election of 1946, taking office on 4 June 1946 serving as a frontbencher chairing the special parliamentary committee for the Financial Relationship Law and the de facto Whip and spokesperson for the Interior, Social Affairs, Housing and Spatial Planning, Culture, Press media and Postal Services. Beernink also served as Chairman of the Christian Historical Union from 9 July 1958 until 19 March 1966. In February 1963 the Leader of the Christian Historical Union and Parliamentary leader of the Christian Historical Union Hendrik Tilanus announced his retirement from national politics and that he wouldn't stand for the election of 1963, the Christian Historical Union leadership approached Beernink as his successor, Beernink accepted and became the Leader of the Christian Historical Union and the Lijsttrekker (top candidate) for the election, taking office on 20 February 1963. The Christian Historical Union made a small win, gaining 1 seat and now had 13 seats in the House of Representatives, Beernink subsequently became Parliamentary leader in the House of Representatives, taking office on 16 May 1963. The following second cabinet formation of 1963 resulted in a coalition agreement between the Christian Historical Union, the Catholic People's Party (KVP), the People's Party for Freedom and Democracy (VVD) and the Anti-Revolutionary Party (ARP) which formed the Cabinet Marijnen with Beernink opting to remain in the House of Representatives instead of accepting a cabinet post in the new cabinet and he continued to serve in the House of Representatives as Parliamentary leader. For the election of 1967 Beernink served for a second time as Lijsttrekker. The Christian Historical Union suffered a small loss, losing 1 seat and now had 12 seats in the House of Representatives. The following cabinet formation of 1967 resulted in a coalition agreement between the Catholic People's Party, the People's Party for Freedom and Democracy (VVD), the Anti-Revolutionary Party (ARP) and the Christian Historical Union (CHU) which formed the Cabinet De Jong with Beernink appointed as Minister of the Interior, taking office on 5 April 1967. On 12 April 1967 Beernink announced that he was stepping down as Leader in favor of Parliamentary leader in the House of Representatives Jur Mellema. In March 1967 Beernink announced that he wouldn't stand for the election of 1971. Following the cabinet formation of 1971 Beernink was not giving a cabinet post in the new cabinet, the Cabinet De Jong was replaced by the Cabinet Biesheuvel I on 6 July 1971.

Beernink semi-retired from active politics and became active in the public sector and occupied numerous seats as a nonprofit director on several supervisory boards and served on several state commissions and councils on behalf of the government (Kiesraad, Public Pension Funds APB and the Cadastre Agency)

Beernink was known for his abilities as a manager and team leader. Beernink continued to comment on political affairs until his is death at the age of 69.

== Decorations ==
Honours
Ribbon bar	Honour	Country	Date	Comment
	Commander of the Order of Orange-Nassau	Netherlands	17 July 1971	
	Commander of the Order of the Netherlands Lion	Netherlands	30 April 1978	Elevated from Knight (4 June 1958)

Party political offices
Preceded by Hendrik Tilanus	Chairman of the Christian; Historical Union; 1958–1966	Succeeded by Arnold Tilanus
Preceded by Hendrik Tilanus; 1959	Lijsttrekker of the Christian Historical Union; 1963 • 1967	Succeeded by Bé Udink; 1971
Preceded by Hendrik Tilanus	Leader of the Christian; Historical Union; 1963–1967	Succeeded by Jur Mellema
Preceded by Hendrik Tilanus	Parliamentary leader of the Christian Historical Union in the House of Representatives; 1963–1967	Succeeded by Jur Mellema
Political offices
Preceded by Koos Verdam	Minister of the Interior; 1967–1971	Succeeded by Molly Geertsema
Civic offices
Preceded by Teun Struycken	Chairman of the Supervisory board of the Electoral Council; 1976–1979	Succeeded by Gaius de Gaay Fortman
