= List of candidates in the 1929 Dutch general election =

Prior to the 1929 Dutch general election, contesting parties put forward party lists.

== Christian Historical Union ==
Candidate list for the Christian Historical Union
Position	Candidate	Votes	Result
1	Jan Schokking	324,869	Elected
2	Dirk Jan de Geer	3,051	Elected, but declined
3	Jouke Bakker	1,161	Elected
4	Reinhardt Snoeck Henkemans	1,016	Elected
5	Jan Weitkamp	6,673	Elected
6	Jan Rudolph Slotemaker de Bruine	2,213	Elected
7	Jan Krijger	507	Elected
8	Hermanus Johannes Lovink	628	Elected
9	Hendrik Tilanus	369	Elected
10	Frida Katz	2,029	Elected
11	Carel Wessel Theodorus van Boetzelaer van Dubbeldam	705	Elected
12	Frans Beelaerts van Blokland	579	
13	Jan Willem Hendrik Rutgers van Rozenburg	342	Replacement
14	Johan Langman	318	Replacement
15	Johannes Anthonie de Visser	8,648	
16	P.J. Nahuisen	145	
17	N.G. Veldhoen	317	
18	Tjeerd Krol	157	
19	Jochum van Bruggen	140	
20	A. Broen	681	

== Reformed Political Party ==
Candidate list for the Reformed Political Party
Position	Candidate	Votes	Result
1	Gerrit Hendrik Kersten	69,197	Elected
2	Pieter Zandt	5,008	Elected
3	Cor van Dis	482	Elected
4	E. Kuyk	247	
5	A.J. Kersten	568	
6	J.W. van Houdt	135	
7	David Kodde	137	
8	A. van der Kooij	306	
9	D. van Leeuwen	79	
10	C.B. van Woerden	101	
11	A. Hoogendijk	89	
12	B.J. van Putten	72	
13	W. van de Vate	288	

== Union of Nationalists ==
Candidate list for the Union of Nationalists
Position	Candidate	Votes	Result
1	Cornelis Herfst Adriaan van der Mijle	2,322	
2	Cornelis Johannes van Eijsden	92	
3	D. Houtzagers	57	
4	J.L.Ch. van Beetem	44	
5	B. van Spanje	82	
6	C.J. Minck	41	
7	P.Th. van Munnekrede	19	
8	Hendrik van Dalsum	51	
9	H.C.M. Kerkhoff	65	

== Source ==
- "Besluit van het Centraal Stembureau bedoeld in artikel 97 der Kieswet". Nederlandsche staatscourant. 13 July 1929 – via Delpher.
