= Roelof Kruisinga =

Dutch politician (1922–2012)

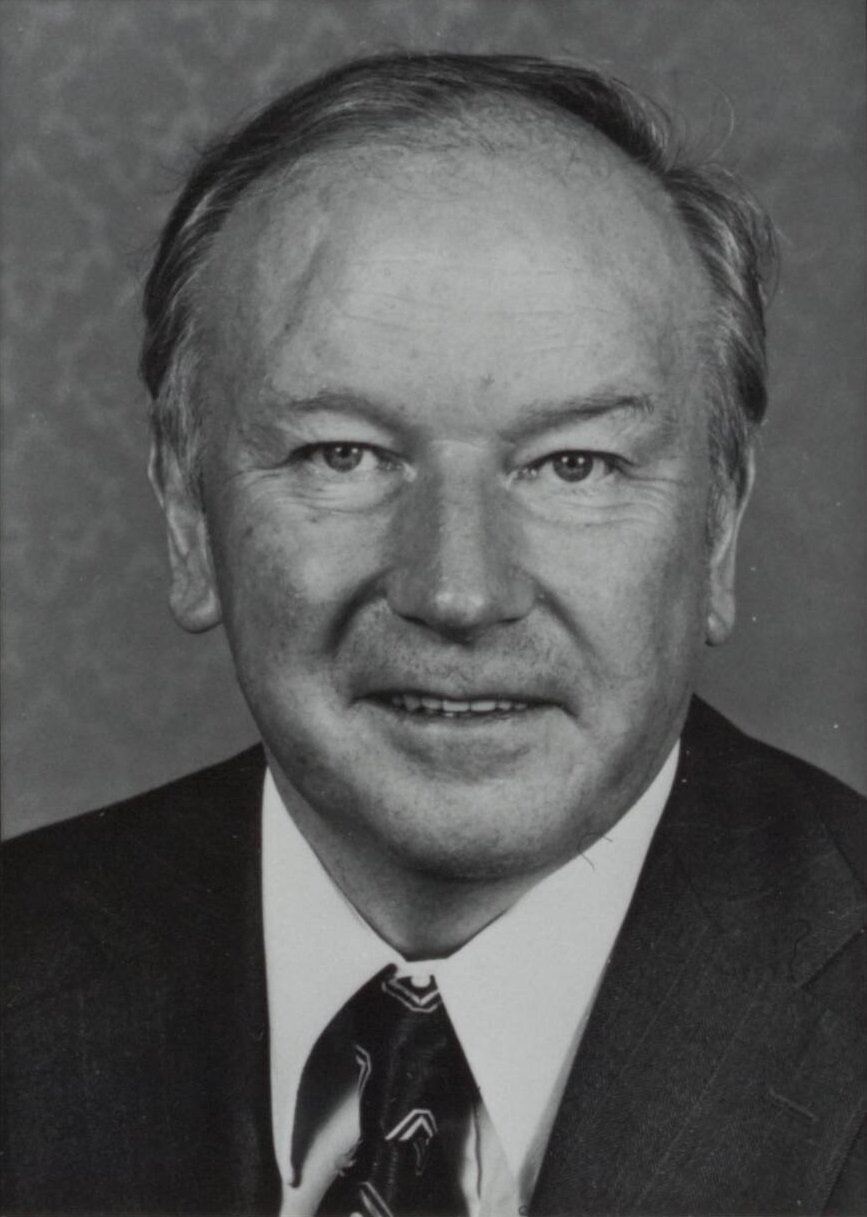
- Kruisinga in 1977

Member of the Senate
- In office 10 June 1981 – 11 June 1991
- Parliamentary group: Christian Democratic Appeal

Minister of Defence
- In office 19 December 1977 – 4 March 1978
- Prime Minister: Dries van Agt
- Preceded by: Bram Stemerdink
- Succeeded by: Jan de Koning (Ad interim)

Leader of the Christian Historical Union
- In office 1 July 1973 – 25 May 1977
- Deputy: Durk van der Mei
- Preceded by: Arnold Tilanus
- Succeeded by: Office discontinued

State Secretary for Transport and Water Management
- In office 28 July 1971 – 20 March 1973
- Prime Minister: Barend Biesheuvel
- Preceded by: Mike Keyzer
- Succeeded by: Michel van Hulten

Parliamentary leader in the House of Representatives
- In office 1 July 1973 – 25 May 1977
- Preceded by: Arnold Tilanus
- Succeeded by: Office discontinued
- In office 6 July 1971 – 26 July 1971
- Preceded by: Bé Udink
- Succeeded by: Jur Mellema
- Parliamentary group: Christian Historical Union

Member of the House of Representatives
- In office 19 December 1972 – 19 December 1977
- In office 11 May 1971 – 28 July 1971
- Parliamentary group: Christian Historical Union

State Secretary for Social Affairs and Health
- In office 18 April 1967 – 6 July 1971
- Prime Minister: Piet de Jong
- Preceded by: José de Meijer; Louis Bartels
- Succeeded by: Koos Rietkerk as State Secretary for Social Affairs; Jo Hendriks as State Secretary for Health and Environment (1973)

Personal details
- Born: Roelof Johannes Hendrik Kruisinga; 27 August 1922 Grijpskerk, Netherlands
- Died: 7 December 2012 (aged 90) Wassenaar, Netherlands
- Party: Christian Democratic Appeal (from 1980)
- Other political affiliations: Christian Historical Union (until 1980)
- Spouse: Anna van Beek (m. 1950)
- Children: Jurjen Kruisinga; Hugo Kruisinga
- Education: University of Groningen (Bachelor of Medical Sciences, Master of Medicine, Doctor of Medicine, Doctor of Philosophy); University of Oxford (Master of Surgery)
- Occupation: Politician · Civil servant · Physician · Medical researcher · Health administrator · Nonprofit director · Author

Military service
- Allegiance: Netherlands
- Branch/service: Royal Netherlands Army
- Years of service: 1951–1953 (Conscription)
- Rank: Sergeant
- Unit: Medical Services
- Battles/wars: Cold War

Roelof Johannes Hendrik Kruisinga (27 August 1922 – 7 December 2012) was a Dutch politician of the defunct Christian Historical Union (CHU) party and later the Christian Democratic Appeal (CDA) party and physician.

Kruisinga attended a Gymnasium in Zutphen from June 1935 until June 1939 and applied at the University of Groningen in June 1941 majoring in Medicine. In May 1942 Kruisinga was arrested by the Sicherheitsdienst (SD) and detained in the Kamp Sint-Michielsgestel and was released in July 1944. Following the end of World War II Kruisinga returned to the University of Groningen and obtaining a Bachelor of Medical Sciences degree in June 1946 and worked as a student researcher before graduating with a Master of Medicine degree on 12 October 1950. Kruisinga worked as a medical researcher of otorhinolaryngology at the University Medical Center Groningen from January 1950 until November 1955. Kruisinga was conscripted in the Royal Netherlands Army serving as a Sergeant from November 1951 until November 1953. Kruisinga applied at the University of Aberdeen in Aberdeen in August 1951 for a postgraduate education in Surgery and before transferring to the Magdalen College of the University of Oxford in Oxford in May 1952 graduating with a Master of Surgery in September 1953 and later returned to the University of Groningen and got doctorates as a Doctor of Medicine and a Doctor of Philosophy (MD–PhD) on 2 November 1955. Kruisinga worked as an otolaryngologist and internist physician at the University Medical Center Groningen and the Medical Center Leeuwarden from January 1955 until 1 September 1962 and worked as an inspector for the Health Care Inspectorate of the Ministry of Social Affairs and Health in Friesland from 1 April 1960 until 1 September 1962. Kruisinga worked as a civil servant for the Ministry of Social Affairs and Health from 1 September 1962 until 18 April 1967 as Deputy Secretary-General of the Ministry of Social Affairs and Health and Director-General of the department for Public Health of the Ministry of Social Affairs and Health from 1 September 1962 until 1 June 1965 and as Secretary-General of the Ministry of Social Affairs and Health from 1 June 1965 until 18 April 1967.

After the election of 1967 Kruisinga was appointed as State Secretary for Social Affairs and Health in the Cabinet De Jong, taking office on 18 April 1967. After the election of 1971 Kruisinga was elected as a Member of the House of Representatives, taking office on 11 May 1971. After the election of 1971 the Leader of the Christian Historical Union and Parliamentary leader of the Christian Historical Union in the House of Representatives Bé Udink was appointed as Minister of Housing and Spatial Planning in the Cabinet Biesheuvel I, the Christian Historical Union leadership approached Kruisinga as interim Parliamentary leader, taking office on 6 July 1971 until Jur Mellema was approached as the new Leader and Parliamentary leader in the House of Representatives on 26 July 1971. Following cabinet formation of 1971 Kruisinga himself was appointed as State Secretary for Transport and Water Management in the Cabinet Biesheuvel I, taking office on 28 July 1971. The Cabinet Biesheuvel I fell just one year later on 19 July 1972 after the Democratic Socialists '70 (DS'70) retracted their support following there dissatisfaction with the proposed budget memorandum to further reduce the deficit and continued to serve in a demissionary capacity until the first cabinet formation of 1972 when it was replaced by the caretaker Cabinet Biesheuvel II with Kruisinga continuing as State Secretary for Transport and Water Management, taking office on 9 August 1972. After the election of 1972 Kruisinga returned as a Member of the House of Representatives, taking office on 19 December 1972 but he was still serving in the cabinet and because of dualism customs in the constitutional convention of Dutch politics he couldn't serve a dual mandate he subsequently resigned as State Secretary on 20 March 1973. In June 1973 Arnold Tilanus announced he was stepping down as Leader and Parliamentary leader, the Christian Historical Union leadership approached Kruisinga as his successor, Kruisinga accepted and became the Leader and Parliamentary leader, taking office on 1 July 1973. On 10 December 1976 the Christian Historical Union, the Anti-Revolutionary Party (ARP) and the Catholic People's Party (KVP) choose to merge in a political alliance to form the Christian Democratic Appeal (CDA). Incumbent Deputy Prime Minister Dries van Agt of the Catholic People's Party was choose as the first Leader of the Christian Democratic Appeal and became the Lijsttrekker for the election of 1977. The following cabinet formation of 1977 resulted in a coalition agreement between the Christian Democratic Appeal and the People's Party for Freedom and Democracy (VVD) which formed the Cabinet Van Agt-Wiegel with Kruisinga was appointed as Minister of Defence, taking office on 19 December 1977. On 4 March 1978 just three months after taking office Kruisinga resigned after he disagreed with the cabinets decision to not publicly condemn the United States for further developing the Neutron bomb.

Kruisinga semi-retired from national politics and became active in the public sector and served as a Senior Adviser to the World Health Organization (WHO) from 16 August 1978 until 1 June 1979 when he was nominated as Deputy Director–General of the World Health Organization and Vice President of the World Health Assembly, serving until 20 May 1982. Kruisinga was elected as a Member of the Senate following the Senate election of 1981, serving from 10 June 1981 until 11 June 1991. Following the end of his active political career, Kruisinga occupied numerous seats as a nonprofit director for supervisory boards for several international non-governmental organizations and research institutes (Netherlands Cancer Institute, Netherlands Red Cross, Foundation KiKa, Stichting Max Havelaar, Society for the Advancement of Science, Medicine and Surgery and the Royal Dutch Medical Association).

== Biography ==
=== Early life ===
Kruisinga was born in Grijpskerk. His family were Mennonites, but Kruisinga decided not to be baptized and to become a member of the Dutch Reformed Church. As a physician he specialised in otolaryngology and he received his doctorate at the University of Groningen in 1955.

=== Politics ===
He held different positions as a physician before he became State Secretary for Social Affairs and Health and subsequently State Secretary for the State Secretary for Transport and Water Management. From 1971 to 1977 he was leader of the Christian Historical Union. He was Minister of Defense under Prime Minister Dries van Agt from 1977 to 1978. In the early eighties he became vice-president of the World Health Organization. Afterwards he became a member of the Senate, serving from 1981 to 1991 and representing the Christian Democratic Appeal. He died, aged 90, in Wassenaar.

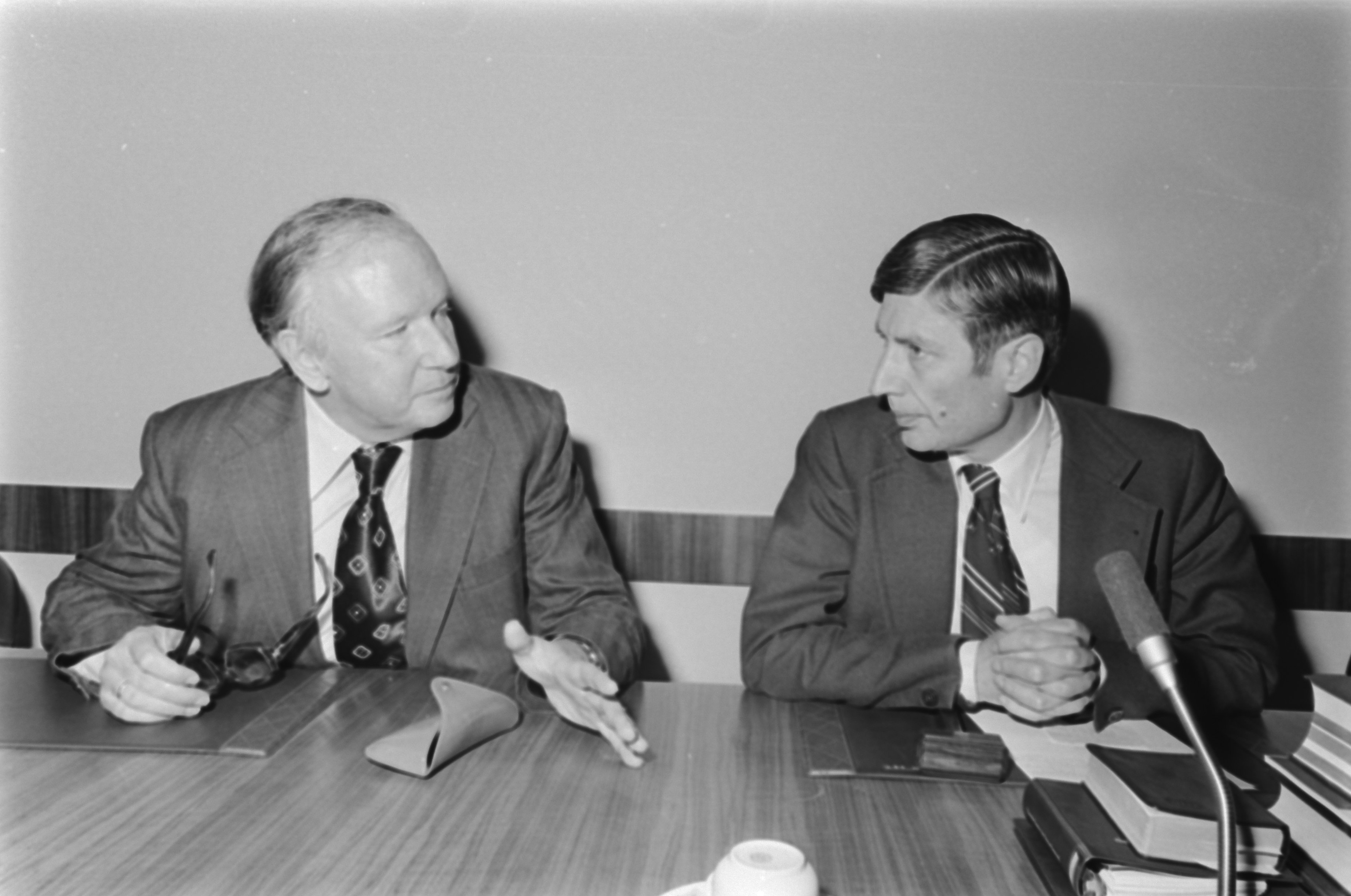
Member of the House of Representatives Roelof Kruisinga and Parliamentary leader Dries van Agt during a meeting in The Hague on 7 October 1977.

== Decorations ==
Honours
Ribbon bar	Honour	Country	Date	Comment
	Knight of the Order of the Netherlands Lion	Netherlands	8 June 1973	
	Grand Officer of the Order of Leopold II	Belgium	2 February 1978	
	Commander of the Order of Orange-Nassau	Netherlands	10 December 1980	
	Commander of the Legion of Honour	France	15 May 1982	
	Medal for Merits	Slovenia	30 January 2000	

Party political offices
Preceded by Bé Udink	Parliamentary leader of the Christian Historical Union in the House of Representatives; 1971; 1973–1977	Succeeded by Jur Mellema
Preceded by Arnold Tilanus	Parliamentary leader of the Christian Historical Union in the House of Representatives; 1971; 1973–1977	Succeeded by Office discontinued
Preceded by Arnold Tilanus	Leader of the Christian; Historical Union; 1973–1977	Succeeded by Office discontinued
Political offices
Preceded by José de Meijer	State Secretary for Social; Affairs and Health; 1967–1971	Succeeded by Koos Rietkerk as State Secretary for Social Affairs
Preceded by Louis Bartels	State Secretary for Social; Affairs and Health; 1967–1971	Succeeded by Jo Hendriks as State Secretary for Health and Environment (1973)
Preceded by Mike Keyzer	State Secretary for Transport and Water Management; 1971–1973	Succeeded by Michel van Hulten
Preceded by Bram Stemerdink	Minister of Defence; 1977–1978	Succeeded by Jan de Koning; Ad interim
Civic offices
Preceded by Unknown	Director–General of the Department for Public Health of the Ministry of Social Affairs and Health; 1962–1965	Succeeded by Unknown
Preceded by Unknown	Deputy Secretary–General of the Ministry of Social Affairs and Health; 1962–1965	Succeeded by Unknown
Preceded by Johann Klatte	Secretary–General of the Ministry of Social Affairs and Health; 1965–1967	Succeeded by Ad Kuiper
Diplomatic posts
Unknown	Deputy Director–General of the World Health Organization; 1979–1982	Unknown
Unknown	Vice President of the World Health Assembly; 1979–1982	Unknown
