= 1972-'73 Dutch cabinet formation =

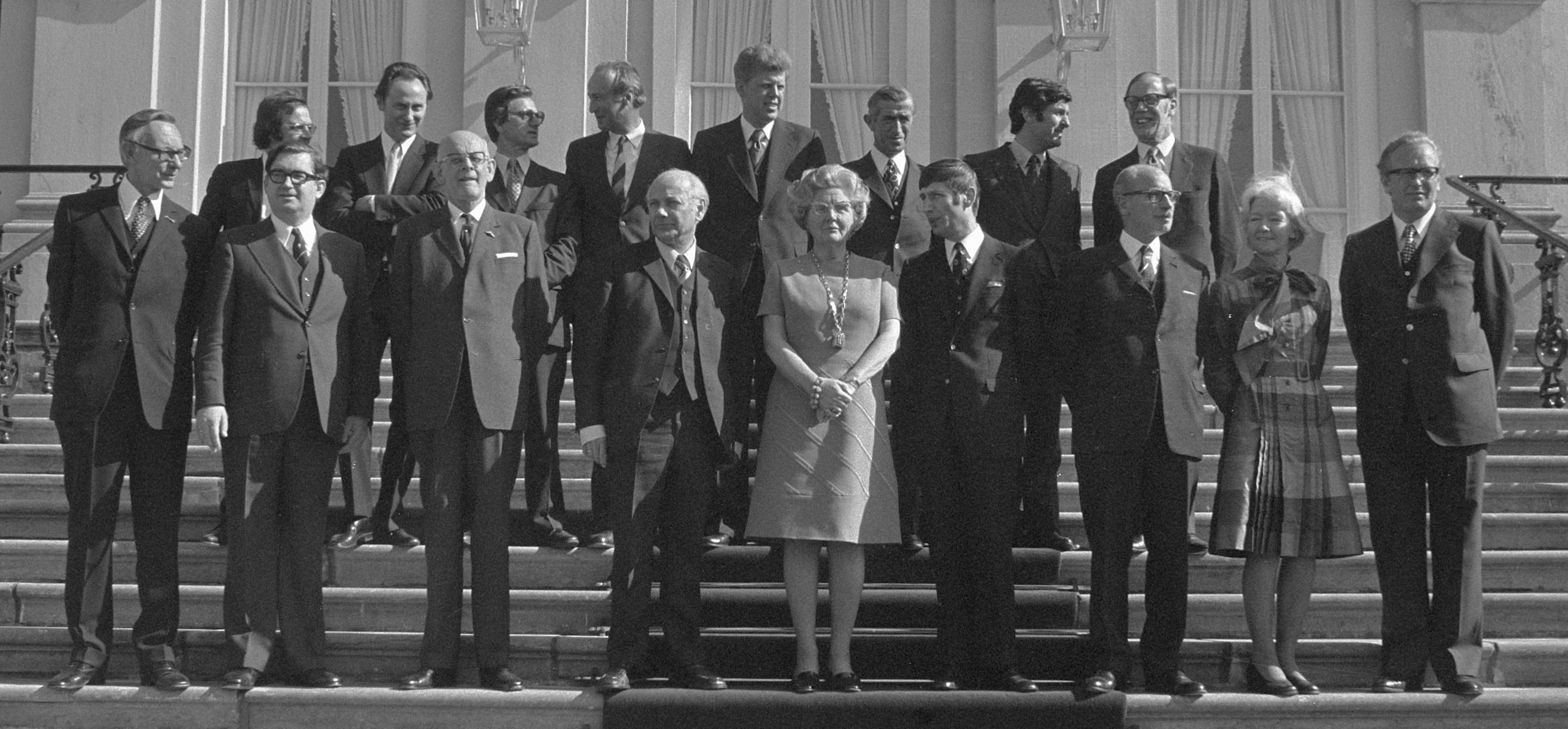
The ministers of the Den Uyl cabinet shortly after their swearing-in ceremony, with Queen Juliana seated at the centre.

The 1972–1973 Dutch cabinet formation followed the general election of 29 November 1972 and resulted, after 151 days of negotiations, in the formation of the Den Uyl cabinet, setting a new post-war Dutch record for the longest cabinet formation at the time.

The new cabinet was supported in the House of Representatives by the parliamentary groups of the Labour Party (PvdA) and Democrats 66 (D'66), both of which also supplied ministers, together with several ministers from the Catholic People's Party, Anti-Revolutionary Party (ARP), and Political Party of Radicals (PPR). The cabinet occupies a distinctive place in the post-war history of the Dutch parliamentary system because it was a minority government and included ministers from parties that had not formally committed themselves beforehand to a coalition agreement or governing programme.

== Background ==
The election followed the collapse of the First Biesheuvel cabinet, which had been supported by the ARP, KVP, Christian Historical Union (CHU), People's Party for Freedom and Democracy (VVD), and Democratic Socialists '70 (DS'70). The subsequent caretaker Second Biesheuvel cabinet prepared for the elections after the resignation of the DS'70 ministers. DS'70, a breakaway from the PvdA formed in reaction to the increasingly left-wing course of the Labour Party under the influence of New Left, could no longer support the government's financial policies.

=== Progressive and confessional cooperation ===
The 1972 election took place during a period of strong political polarisation in the Netherlands, with ideological differences between left and right becoming increasingly pronounced. Prior to the election, three progressive parties — the PvdA, D'66, and the PPR — agreed to cooperate electorally, resulting in the joint manifesto Keerpunt '72 ("Turning Point '72"). In 1971 the three parties had also formed a shadow cabinet, the Den Uyl shadow cabinet, modelled on the British system.

The progressive alliance entered the election seeking the formation of a "progressive cabinet" centred on their cooperation. Meanwhile, the three major confessional parties — the KVP, ARP, and CHU — had begun exploring closer cooperation that would eventually lead to the formation of the Christian Democratic Appeal (CDA). They also presented a joint political programme before the election.

The principal party leaders during the campaign were Joop den Uyl (PvdA), Frans Andriessen (KVP), Hans Wiegel (VVD), Barend Biesheuvel (ARP), Arnold Tilanus (CHU), Hans van Mierlo (D'66), and Bas de Gaay Fortman (PPR).

=== Election results ===
For the first time, citizens aged 18 to 21 were allowed to vote in a Dutch general election. The election significantly altered the political landscape. The KVP and CHU suffered heavy losses, losing eight and four seats respectively. The ARP, led by incumbent prime minister Barend Biesheuvel, gained one seat and became the only confessional governing party to improve its position.

The PvdA emerged as by far the largest party with 43 seats. The VVD gained six seats, while the PPR increased from two to seven seats. Additional gains were made by the Farmers' Party, the Communist Party of the Netherlands (CPN), and the newly established Roman Catholic Party Netherlands (RKPN). DS'70 and D'66 both lost seats.

The outgoing coalition of the KVP, VVD, ARP, CHU, and DS'70 retained only a narrow majority of 76 seats in the House of Representatives. The progressive bloc of PvdA, PPR, and D'66 did not command a majority either. A key difficulty during the cabinet formation was that the KVP and ARP were unwilling to continue cooperation with DS'70, which they considered unreliable after its participation in the Biesheuvel cabinet. The confessional parties therefore sought cooperation with left-wing parties to create a centre-left coalition. The progressive alliance, however, rejected a moderate centre-left coalition and instead pursued the formation of a progressive cabinet, even if it had to govern as a minority administration.

== Informateur Ruppert ==
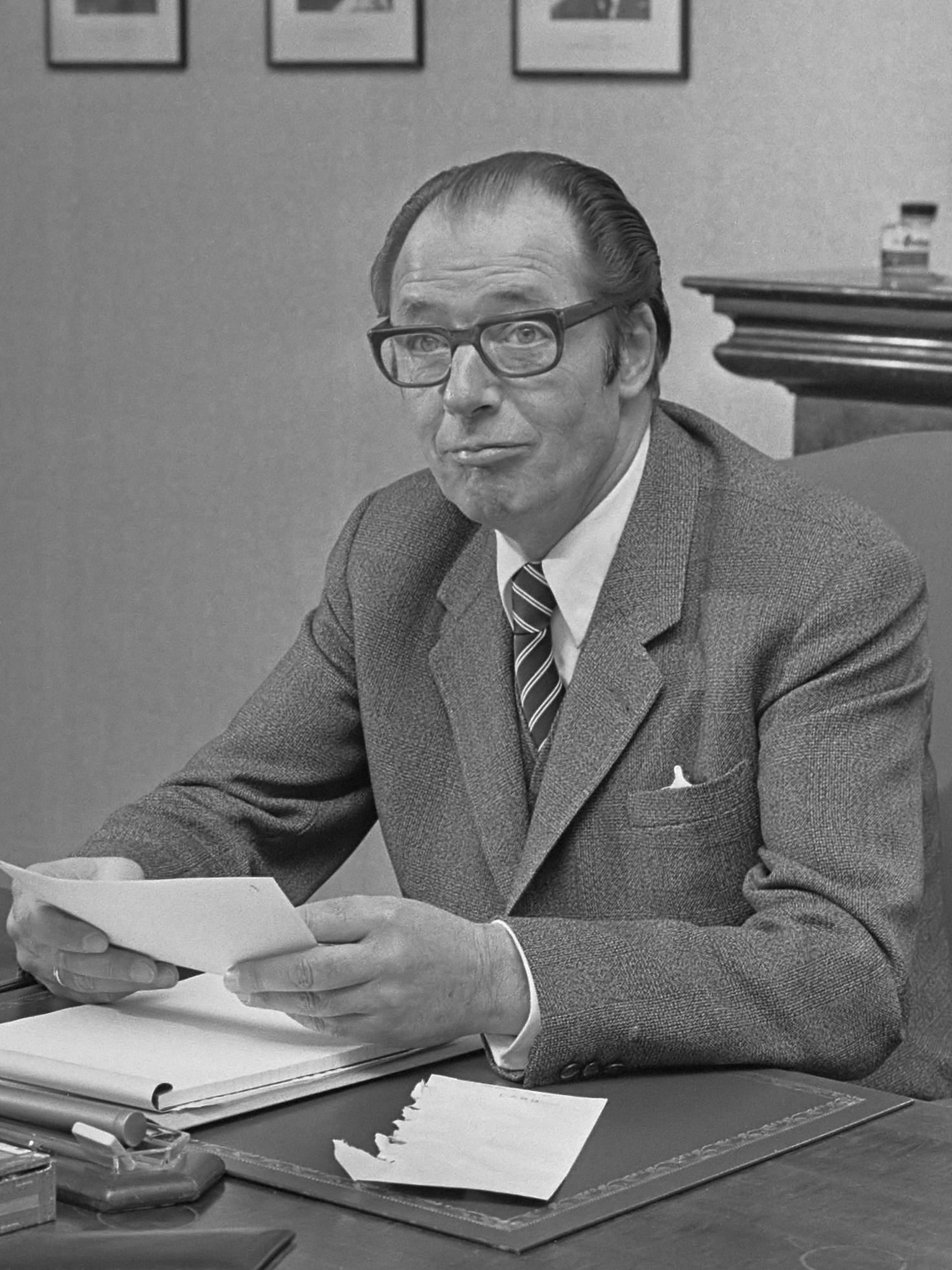
Marinus Ruppert

On 4 December 1972, Queen Juliana appointed Marinus Ruppert, vice-president of the Council of State and former trade union leader affiliated with the ARP, as informateur. He was tasked with exploring possibilities for forming a cabinet capable of maintaining productive relations with parliament or at least obtaining sufficient parliamentary support.

Ruppert maintained frequent consultations with the Queen throughout the process.

=== Majority cabinet ===
According to Ruppert, the election had not produced a majority of parties genuinely willing to cooperate, and every conceivable coalition combination contained major internal divisions.

Early in his investigation it became clear that forming a parliamentary majority coalition consisting of the PvdA, KVP, ARP, PPR, CHU, and D'66 would encounter serious obstacles. While the KVP, ARP, and CHU were prepared to discuss such a coalition, the PvdA and D'66 insisted that negotiations were unlikely to succeed because no binding agreements had been made before the election. The PPR similarly concluded that the parties' behaviour toward each other in parliament in previous years would make such a coalition unstable.

=== Minority cabinet ===
The collapse of the previous coalition was effectively caused by the refusal of the KVP and ARP to continue governing with DS'70. Remaining options included either a centre-right minority cabinet of the KVP, VVD, ARP, and CHU tolerated by DS'70, or a centre-left minority cabinet centred on the PvdA, KVP, and ARP with additional support from either D'66 and the PPR or the CHU.

Ruppert noted that minority cabinets had historically functioned as transitional solutions during political deadlock, though the contemporary political climate was far more polarised than in earlier decades.

=== Extra-parliamentary cabinet ===
On 16 January 1973, Ruppert published an opinion article in the newspaper De Tijd advocating consideration of an extra-parliamentary cabinet, including the possibility of a so-called programme cabinet.

He subsequently invited the parliamentary leaders of eight parties — Den Uyl, Andriessen, Wiegel, Biesheuvel, De Gaay Fortman, Tilanus, Berger, and Van Mierlo — for consultations. In his final report, Ruppert advised the appointment of a prominent Labour politician as formateur.

== Formateur Burger ==
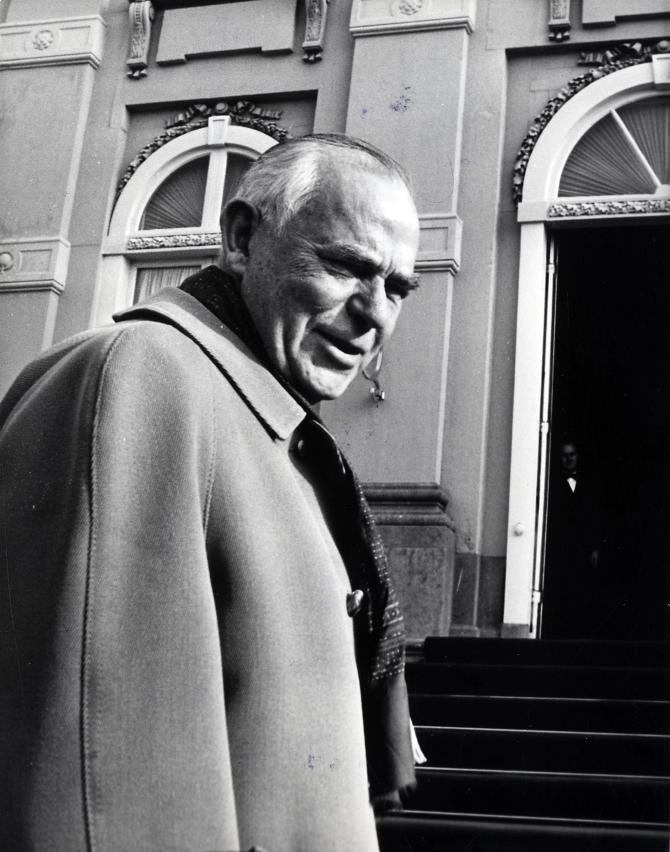
Jaap Burger at Huis ten Bosch Palace during the cabinet formation

The Queen subsequently appointed Jaap Burger, member of the Council of State and prominent Labour politician, as formateur of a cabinet "expected to enjoy sufficient support in parliament". Burger, who enjoyed broad public respect as a wartime resistance figure and Engelandvaarder, saw his task as forming a cabinet led by Joop den Uyl.

Burger drafted proposals for a governing programme that combined elements from both progressive and confessional election manifestos.

=== National programme cabinet ===
Burger interpreted his assignment as also allowing the formation of an extra-parliamentary "programme cabinet". Former informateur Piet Steenkamp supported this idea from outside the negotiations, proposing a temporary national programme cabinet to address major constitutional and socioeconomic issues such as constitutional reform and wage equalisation.

Burger therefore attempted to recruit individual members of the confessional parties into a Den Uyl-led cabinet. He succeeded in attracting ARP politicians Jaap Boersma and Wilhelm Friedrich de Gaay Fortman. Burger then explored whether the confessional parliamentary groups would support a progressive cabinet. The KVP and ARP appeared willing to do so but refused to offer explicit support, particularly because the CHU declined to participate in discussions altogether.

Burger subsequently informed the Queen that he wished "to keep his assignment under consideration", a formulation effectively amounting to the return of his mandate.

== Informateurs Van Agt and Albeda ==
Caretaker Minister of Justice Dries van Agt (KVP) and ARP politician Wil Albeda were then appointed by the Queen to investigate under what conditions the confessional parties would support a Den Uyl cabinet.

Although the CHU definitively withdrew from the negotiations, Van Agt and Albeda succeeded in persuading the KVP and ARP to support a Den Uyl-led government. A governing programme was agreed upon that also included arrangements concerning controversial issues such as abortion.

== Final formation ==
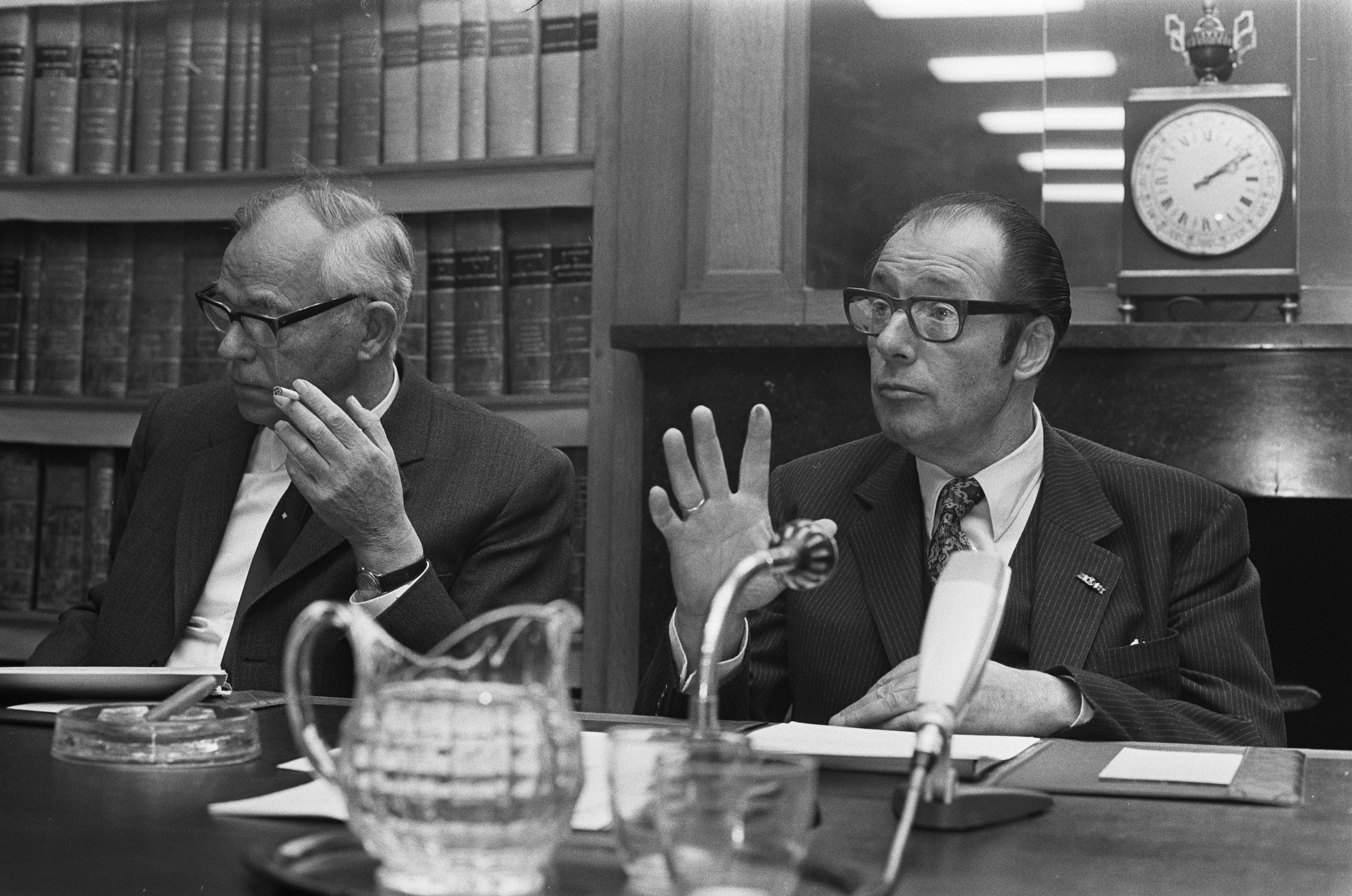
Press conference by informateur Ruppert and formateur Burger, 1 February 1973

After the exploratory phase conducted by Van Agt and Albeda, the cabinet formation was resumed by Ruppert and Burger. Their principal task became finding additional confessional ministers willing to join the cabinet. Van Agt himself agreed to participate and became Deputy Prime Minister in the Den Uyl cabinet.

The PPR also supplied ministers to the cabinet, although the party refused to bind itself formally to the coalition agreements.

== Sources ==
- "Brief van de Minister-President, Minister van Algemene Zaken, Nr. 2" (PDF). Parlement.com. Archived from the original (PDF) on 2024-04-19.
- Maas, P. F. Kabinetsformaties 1959–1973. The Hague: Staatsuitgeverij, 1982. ISBN 9012039983
- "Kabinetsformatie 1972–1973". Parlement.com.
