= Jur Mellema =

Dutch politician (1923–2017)

- Jur Mellema in 1969

Member of the House of Representatives
- In office 15 July 1959 – 1 April 1972

Personal details
- Born: Jurjen Tammo Mellema; 18 September 1923 Nieuw-Scheemda, Netherlands
- Died: 11 May 2017 (aged 93)
- Party: CHU
- Spouse(s): Nellie van Walsum Carla Mutsaers (m. 1980)
- Children: 5

Jurjen Tammo "Jur" Mellema (18 September 1923 – 11 May 2017) was a Dutch farmer and politician. He was a member of the Dutch House of Representatives from 1959 to 1972 for the Christian Historical Union (CHU), serving as the CHU's political leader from 1967 to 1970, with an interruption from 1968 to 1969 after Mellema had been arrested and sentenced to two weeks in jail following a drunk driving accident, and from 1971 to 1972. As CHU leader, Mellema played an important role in strengthening cooperation between the CHU, Catholic People's Party (KVP) and Anti-Revolutionary Party (ARP), which would eventually merge into the Christian Democratic Appeal (CDA).

== Early life ==
Jur Mellema was born on 18 September 1923 in Nieuw-Scheemda to farmer Derk Jans Mellema and Geertjen Harberdina Mellema. Jur Mellema belonged to a family of wealthy "gentleman farmers" in the province of Groningen, and both his father and grandfather had been well-known horse breeders in the area. Mellema attended secondary school in Winschoten, followed by an agricultural school in the city of Groningen, where he graduated from in 1942. Mellema then returned to Nieuw-Scheemda, where he took over his father's 70 hectare farm.

== Political career ==
Mellema entered politics in 1954, when he was elected to the Provincial Council of Groningen as a member of the Christian Historical Union (CHU), serving until 1967. Between 1958 and 1959, Mellema served for a short period as a member of the municipal council of Scheemda.

Mellema was first elected to the House of Representatives in the 1959 Dutch general election. As an MP, Mellema focused on agriculture, environmental issues, and affairs related to the Kingdom of the Netherlands. He served as the KVP's spokesperson on agriculture from 1959.

In 1967, Mellema was chosen as the CHU's new political and parliamentary leader, succeeding Henk Beernink, who became a minister in the De Jong cabinet. As leader, Mellema became known as a thoughtful and jovial figure, frequently appearing in the media. He sought to modernize the CHU, and turn it into a more centrist political party.

One of Mellema's key priorities as leader was to further cooperation between the CHU, the Catholic People's Party (KVP) and the Anti-Revolutionary Party (ARP). He worked to reconcile the KVP and ARP's leaders Norbert Schmelzer and Barend Biesheuvel, who had not been on speaking terms following the Night of Schmelzer, and led efforts through the Group of 18 to establish a united party program based on shared ideological principles. On 14 February 1968, the three leaders including Mellema held a shared television broadcast where they agreed to only enter government together under Mellema's slogan "samen uit, samen thuis" (we're all in this together).

Mellema soon faced personal issues which would irreparably harm his political career. During a budgetary debate in November 1967, Mellema had been visibly drunk, and fellow CHU MP freule Wttewaall van Stoetwegen was subsequently forced to intervene to prevent other MPs from removing Mellema as leader.

In April 1968, Mellema, returning home drunk from a party held by Bé Udink, had crashed his car and was subsequently arrested by police. Five days after, the CHU issued a statement announcing that Mellema intended to step back from his position as party leader, and Mellema wrote personally to Wttewaall van Stoetwegen two weeks later on his intention to quit drinking.

After this incident, the CHU became internally divided between supporters of Mellema, mainly centered around the Group of 18 and the CHU's youth organization, and opponents, led by Willem Scholten, who demanded Mellema's immediate resignation. Following threats from Beernink to cause a political crisis if Mellema was forced to resign and Mellema being sentenced to driving license suspension for a year and two weeks in jail on 26 June, the CHU internally agreed remove Mellema from leadership and as MP for a year. Mellema would be allowed to return after, on the condition he remain loyal to the party and abstain from alcohol. In 1969, Mellema was narrowly re-elected as leader of the CHU, despite efforts from Arnold Tilanus to prevent his return. A year later, he was succeeded as party leader by Bé Udink, Mellema's leadership not having recovered from the incident, and was subsequently denied a position in the Biesheuvel cabinet. Mellema returned as the CHU's political leader in 1971, but in 1972 he left the House of Representatives, citing a desire to spend more time with his family.

== Later life ==
From 1972 to 1990, Mellema worked for the Commodity Board for Poultry and Eggs. He remained active politically in a commission which worked out plans for what would later become the Christian Democratic Appeal (CDA). In 1983, Mellema became an officer in the Order of Orange-Nassau.

Jur Mellema died on 11 May 2017 in Rotterdam.

== Personal life ==
Mellema was married twice. His first marriage was to Nellie van Walsum, a niece of senator and mayor of Rotterdam Gerard van Walsum. Mellema divorced Van Walsum in the late 1970s, which was still considered unusual in his social milieu in that period, attributing the divorce to having been away from his family too often. In 1980, Mellema remarried to Carla Mutsaerts, the ex-wife of former Catholic People's Party leader Norbert Schmelzer.

== Bibliography ==
- van Merriënboer, Johan (2017). "Voortrekker van het CDA en gezelligheidsdrinker. Jur Mellema (1923-2017)". In Bos, A.S. (ed.). Jaarboek Parlementaire Geschiedenis 2017. Het volk spreekt (in Dutch). pp. 142–146.
