= Nellien de Ruiter =

Dutch politician

Nellie Corlina de Ruiter

Member of the Provincial Council of South Holland
- In office 1971-1978

Member of the House of Representatives
- In office 1972

Municipal Councillor of Voorschoten
- In office 1974-1975

Alderman of Voorschoten
- In office 1974-1975

Personal details
- Born: 29 July 1926 Oudemirdum
- Died: 21 August 2000 Hoornsterzwaag
- Party: CHU (until 1977)

Nellien de Ruiter (29 July 1926 – 21 August 2000) was a Dutch politician. She represented the Christian Historical Union (CHU) in the House of Representatives in 1972.

== Biography ==
De Ruiter studied architecture at the Delft University of Technology. She worked at the National Spatial Planning Agency and later as head of the planning department at the Zuiderzee Works Service. In the 1960s, she was a research assistant at the Delft University of Technology.

In the 1970 Dutch provincial elections in South Holland, De Ruiter was a candidate for the Christian Historical Union (CHU). She was not elected directly but joined on 15 December 1971 as a replacement. She remained a member of the Provincial council until 31 December 1977.

In the 1971 Dutch general election, De Ruiter was not immediately elected but joined as a replacement on 11 April 1972. In the 1972 Dutch general election, De Ruiter was placed eleventh on the candidate list and was not elected. On 7 December 1972, she left the House.

After her time as an MP, De Ruiter became a municipal councillor and alderman in Voorschoten on 3 September 1974. Due to other commitments, she sometimes arrived late and unprepared for meetings, which raised concerns about her performance. After less than a year, she resigned, feeling unsupported by her party.

In 1978, De Ruiter resigned from the CHU. She disagreed with the first Van Agt cabinet, formed during the 1977 Dutch cabinet formation, in which the Christian Democratic Appeal (CDA) – a merger of the CHU and two other Christian parties – and the People's Party for Freedom and Democracy (VVD) participated. She specifically objected to CDA leader Dries van Agt.

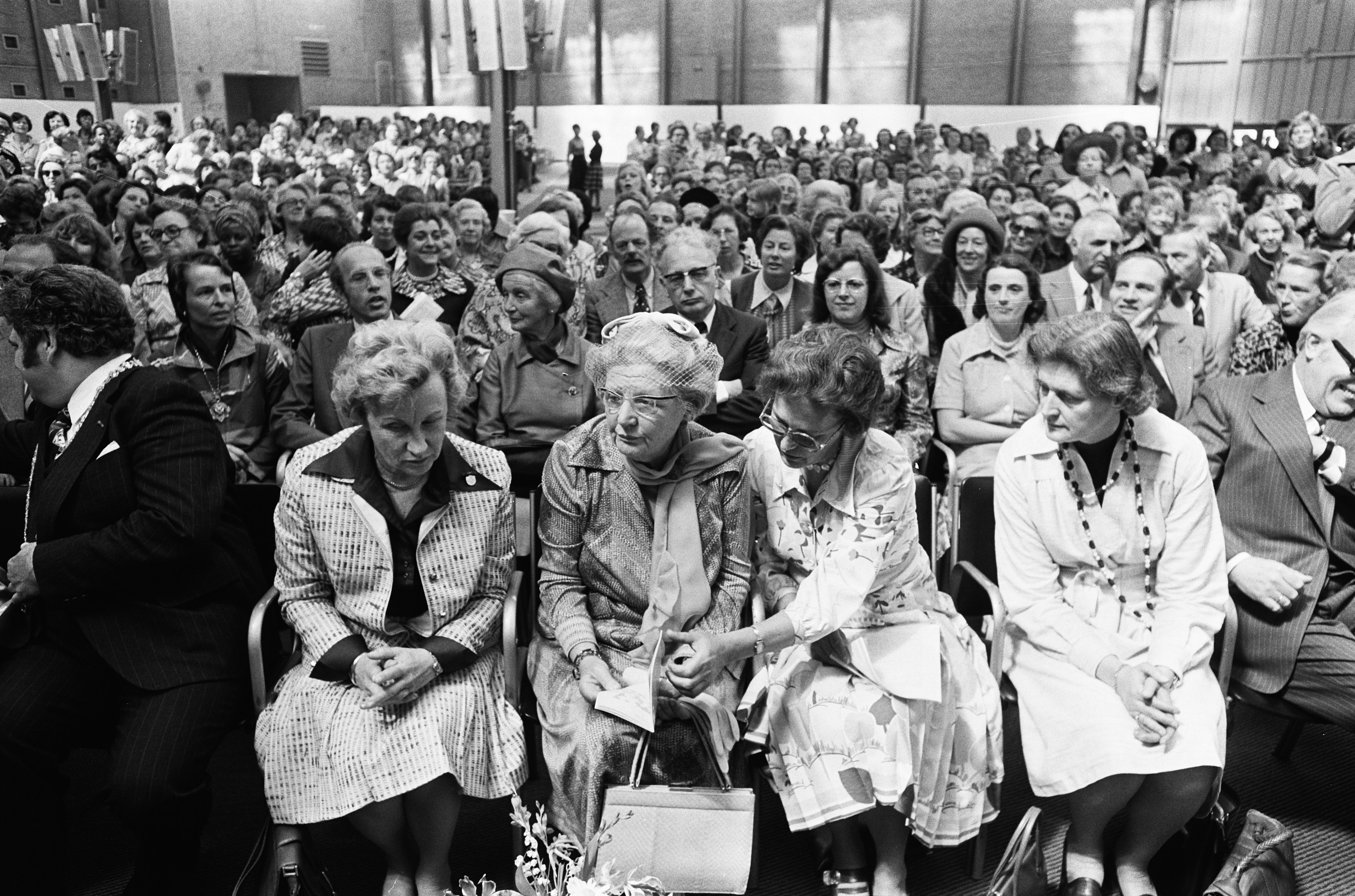
Nellien de Ruiter (front row, second from the right) next to Queen Juliana during Emancipade, part of the International Women's Year

De Ruiter served on various boards, including the Council for Spatial Planning. She accepted a request from PPR Minister Harry van Doorn to chair the government commission for the International Women's Year (1975). In 1979, she became the chairwoman of FIOM, an organization offering assistance for pregnancy and single parenthood.

== Personal life ==
She was the daughter of Kunera Gerwig and school principal Jo de Ruiter, who later became the CHU politician in the House of Representatives.
