= Wim Schut =

Dutch politician (1920–2006)

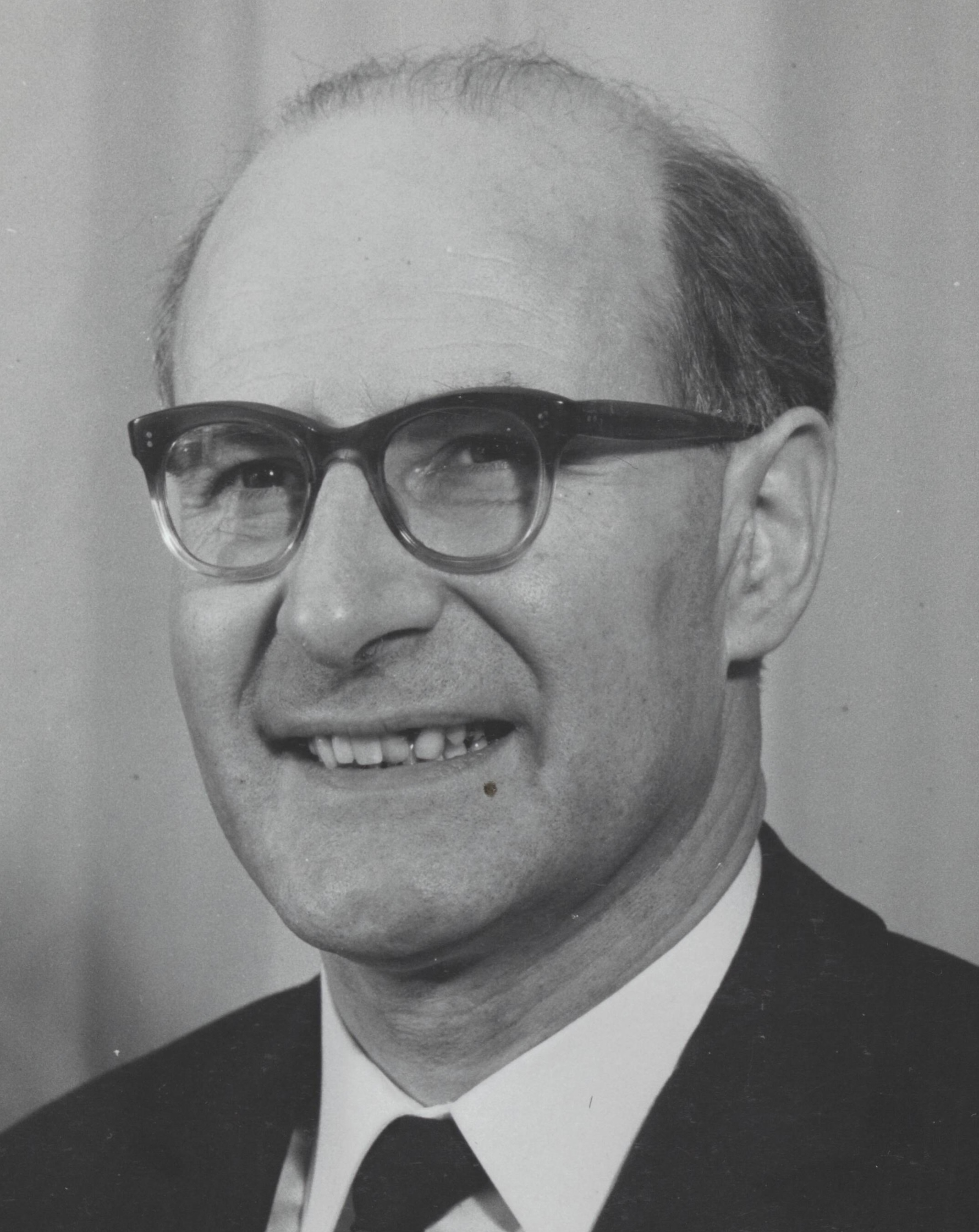
- Schut in 1967

Minister of Housing and Spatial Planning
- In office 5 April 1967 – 6 July 1971
- Prime Minister: Piet de Jong
- Preceded by: Herman Witte
- Succeeded by: Bé Udink

Personal details
- Born: Willem Frederik Schut; 21 August 1920 Amsterdam, Netherlands
- Died: 15 August 2006 (aged 85) Nieuwerkerk aan den IJssel, Netherlands
- Party: Anti-Revolutionary Party
- Occupation: Politician, urban planner

Willem Frederik "Wim" Schut (21 August 1920 – 15 August 2006) was a Dutch politician for the Anti-Revolutionary Party (ARP) and urban planner.

Political offices
Preceded by Herman Witte	Minister of Housing and Spatial Planning; 1967–1971	Succeeded by Bé Udink
