= Els Veder-Smit =

Dutch politician (1921–2020)

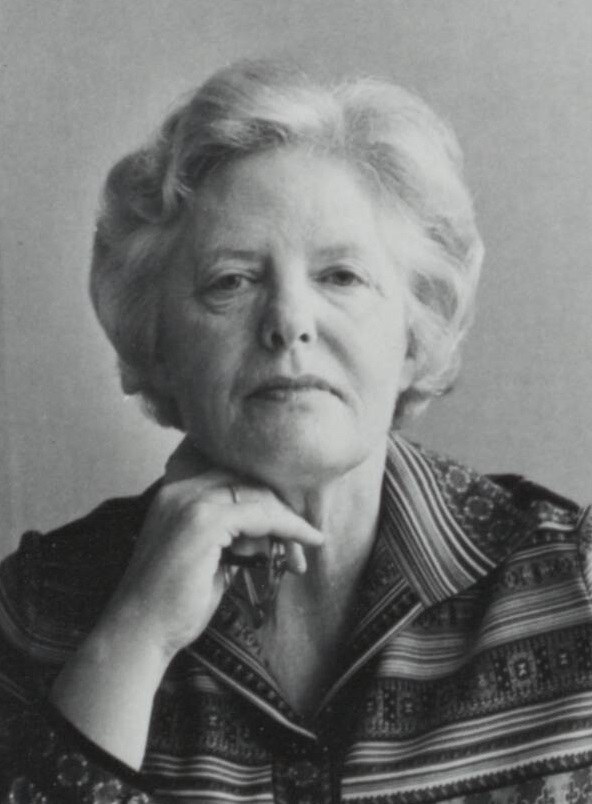
- Veder-Smit in 1978

Member of the Senate
- In office 25 August 1981 – 11 June 1991

State Secretary for Health and Environment
- In office 3 January 1978 – 11 September 1981
- Prime Minister: Dries van Agt
- Preceded by: Jo Hendriks
- Succeeded by: Ineke Lambers-Hacquebard

Member of the House of Representatives
- In office 23 February 1967 – 3 January 1978

Personal details
- Born: Elizabeth Smit; 29 August 1921 Kinderdijk, Netherlands
- Died: 26 August 2020 (aged 98)
- Party: People's Party for Freedom and Democracy (from 1950)
- Education: Utrecht University (Bachelor of Laws, Master of Laws)
- Occupation: Politician · Nonprofit director

Elizabeth "Els" Veder-Smit (29 August 1921 – 26 August 2020) was a Dutch politician of the People's Party for Freedom and Democracy (VVD) and nonprofit director. She was both the Oldest living former cabinet member since the death of Johan Witteveen on 23 April 2019 and the oldest living former member of the States General since the death of Bart Hofman on 2 May 2019.

Veder-Smit was alderman of Zeist from 1958 to 1962, and municipal councillor of Leeuwarden from 1962 to 1966.

== Decorations ==
Honours
| Ribbon bar | Honour | Country | Date | Comment |
|---|---|---|---|---|
| | Knight of the Order of the Netherlands Lion | Netherlands | 26 October 1981 | |

Awards
| Ribbon bar | Awards | Organization | Date | Comment |
|---|---|---|---|---|
| | Honorary Member | People's Party for Freedom and Democracy | 15 May 1998 | |

Political offices
| Preceded by Jo Hendriks | State Secretary for Health and Environment; 1978–1981 | Succeeded by Ineke Lambers-Hacquebard |
Records
| Preceded by Johan Witteveen | Oldest living former cabinet member 23 April 2019 – 26 August 2020 | Incumbent |
| Preceded by Bart Hofman | Oldest living former member of the States General; 2 May 2019 – 26 August 2020 | Incumbent |
