= Jo Hendriks =

Dutch politician (1923–2001)

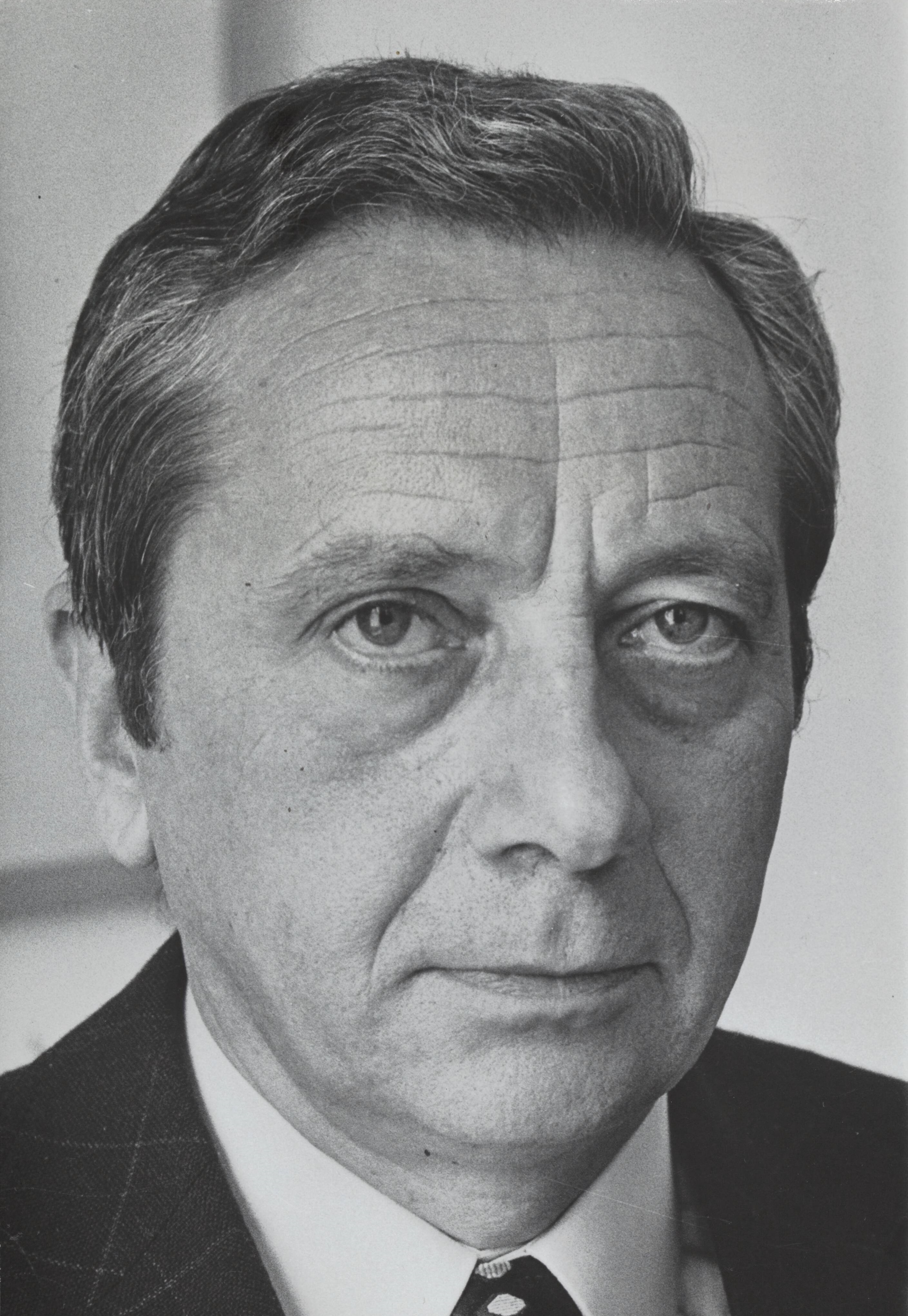
- Hendriks in 1973

State Secretary for Health and Environment
- In office 11 May 1973 – 19 December 1977
- Prime Minister: Joop den Uyl
- Minister: Irene Vorrink
- Preceded by: Roelof Kruisinga as State Secretary for Social Affairs and Health
- Succeeded by: Els Veder-Smit

Member of the House of Representatives
- In office 8 June 1977 – 7 September 1977

Personal details
- Born: Josephus Petronella Maria Hendriks; 4 March 1923 Sint-Oedenrode, Netherlands
- Died: 5 September 2001 (aged 78) Tilburg, Netherlands
- Party: Christian Democratic Appeal (from 1980)
- Other political affiliations: Catholic People's Party (until 1980)
- Occupation: Politician; Director

Josephus Petronella Maria "Jo" Hendriks (4 March 1923 – 5 September 2001) was a Dutch politician of the defunct Catholic People's Party (KVP) party, later the Christian Democratic Appeal (CDA) party.

== Career ==
Hendriks came from the insurance industry. He was the first politician to come up with coherent ideas for a national health insurance scheme. After his political career, he became the chairman of broadcaster Katholieke Radio Omroep (KRO) and other bodies in public health.

Political offices
Preceded by Roelof Kruisinga as State Secretary for Social Affairs and Health	State Secretary for Health and Environment; 1973–1977	Succeeded by Els Veder-Smit
