= Freule Wttewaall van Stoetwegen =

Dutch politician (1901–1986)

Jonkvrouw Freule Wttewaall van Stoetwegen
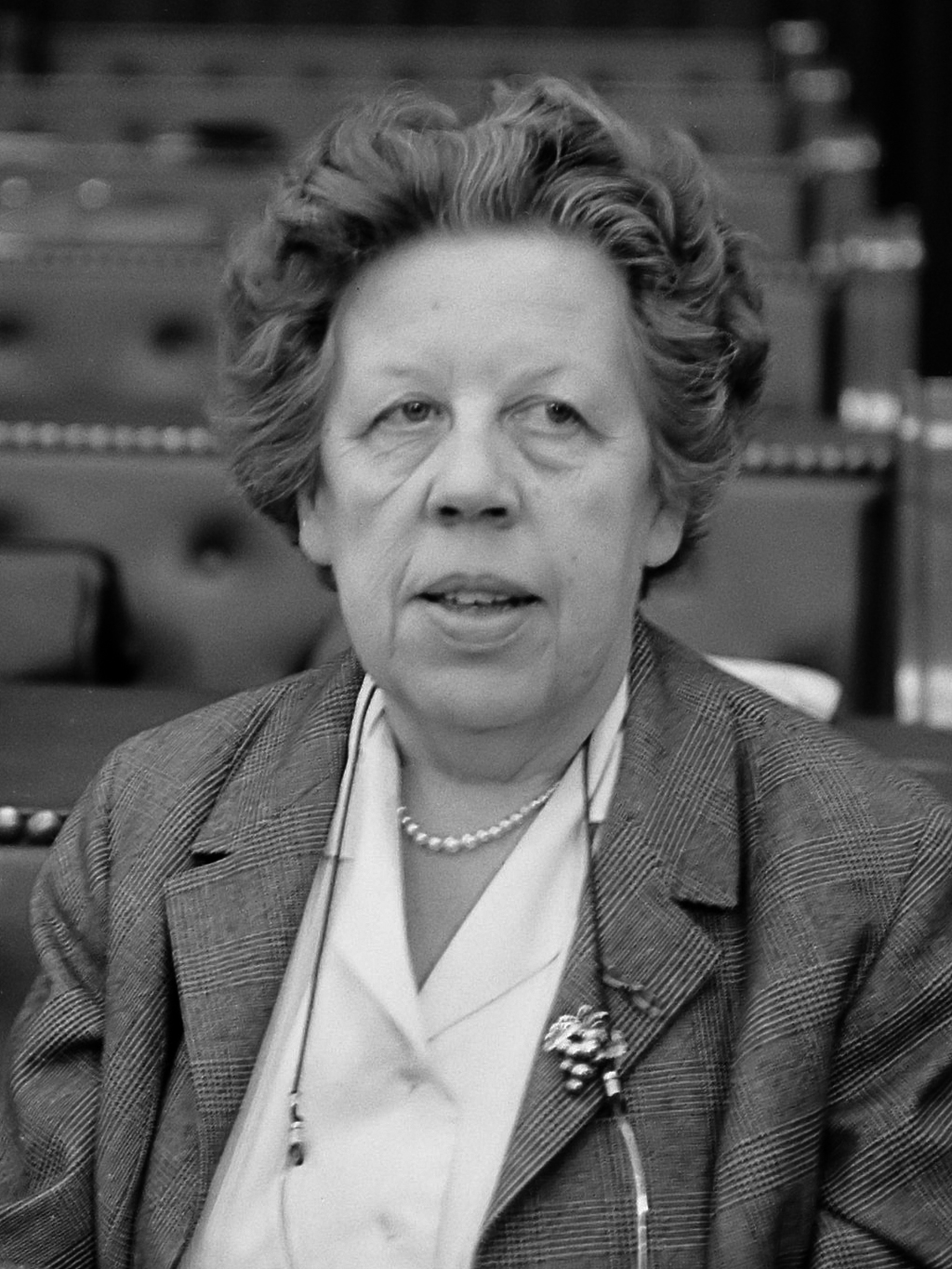
- Wttewaall van Stoetwegen in 1965

Member of the House of Representatives
- In office 20 November 1945 – 9 May 1971
- Preceded by: Frida Katz

Personal details
- Born: Christine Wilhelmine Isabelle Wttewaall van Stoetwegen; 1 January 1901 Amsterdam, Netherlands
- Died: 15 October 1986 (aged 85) The Hague, Netherlands
- Party: Christian Historical Union
- Education: Leiden University

Jonkvrouw Christine Wilhelmine Isabelle "Bob" Wttewaall van Stoetwegen (Note: Dutch: [ˈfrœːlə ˈytəʋaːl vɑn ˈstutʋeːɣə(n)]) (1 January 1901 – 15 October 1986), nicknamed de freule, was a Dutch politician of the Christian Historical Union (CHU). Born into a noble family in Amsterdam, she was raised in Oostburg and Rotterdam. She befriended the future Queen Juliana while studying law at Leiden University. She was a secretary for the Federation of Christian Associations of and for Women and Girls and for the Dutch Christian Women's League. Wttewaall van Stoetwegen succeeded Frida Katz as a member of the House of Representatives on 20 November 1945. She served as the vice parliamentary leader of the CHU group, and her last term ended on 9 May 1971. She died in The Hague in 1986.
