= Netherland Indies Gas Company =

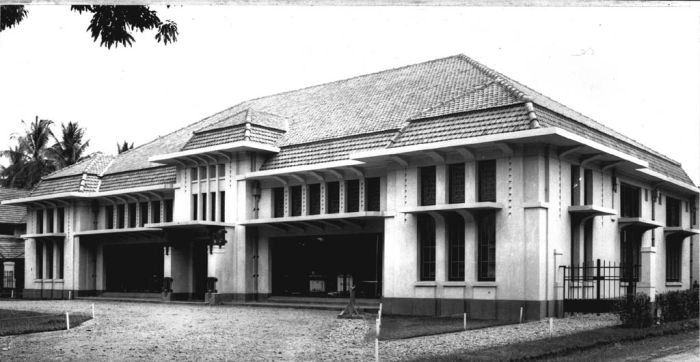
Office of NIGM in Medan (ca. 1925), now the Indonesian Perusahaan Listrik Negara.

The Netherland Indies Gas Company (Nederlandsch Indische Gasmaatschappij (NIGM) was a business in the Dutch East Indies, Suriname and the Netherlands Antilles. It was founded on 10 December 1863 in the Dutch East Indies and expanded to Suriname (1908) and Curaçao (1927).

As of the World War II era, the company operated 11 gas plants and 33 power plants. The company became Overseas Gas and Electric Company, Dutch: Overzeese Gas- en Electriciteitsmaatschappij (OGEM) as of 1950. Indonesia nationalized the business in 1954. Operations in Suriname were nationalized in the 1970s. Curaçao operations were nationalized in 1977.

The company diversified into trading and construction with acquisitions. In 1959 the electrical installation company Croon & Co Klaas Fibbe was purchased. In 1963, Wolter & Dros. Klaas Fibbe was acquired. In 1969, Dutch technical wholesaler Technische Unie was taken over. Construction company Eesteren was bought in 1972 and Voormolen in 1975.

In September 1973 Fibbe Berend Jan Udink made became a board member and helped expand international activities of OGEM. From 1977 to 1979 construction project in Dammam, Saudi Arabia was undertaken. The project includes eight buildings. In July 1977 OGEM bought an equity stake of 44% in Beton und Monierbau (B & M) in Düsseldorf.

Many acquisitions were funded with debt and in the early 1980s OGEM went bankrupt after a loss of 120 million guilders in 1980. Parts of the company were reorganized under the name Engineering Building and Industry (TBI). Bankruptcy proceedings were completed in 1994.

== Gallery ==
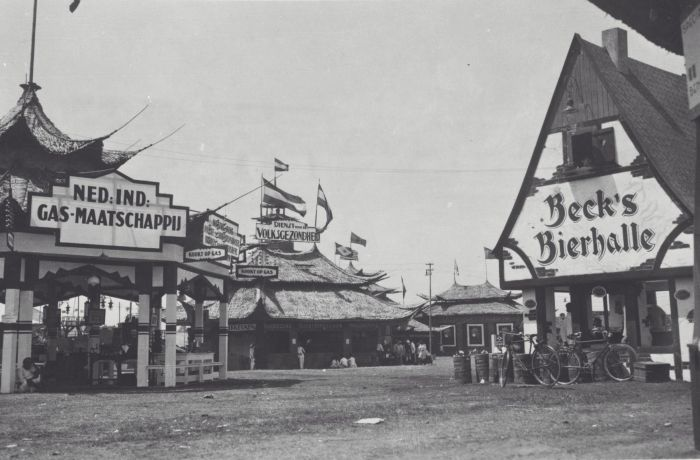
Nederlandsch Indische Gasmaatschappij pavilion and Beck's Bierhalle (Beer Hall) at the Pasar Gambir in Batavia, Dutch East Indies (1925)

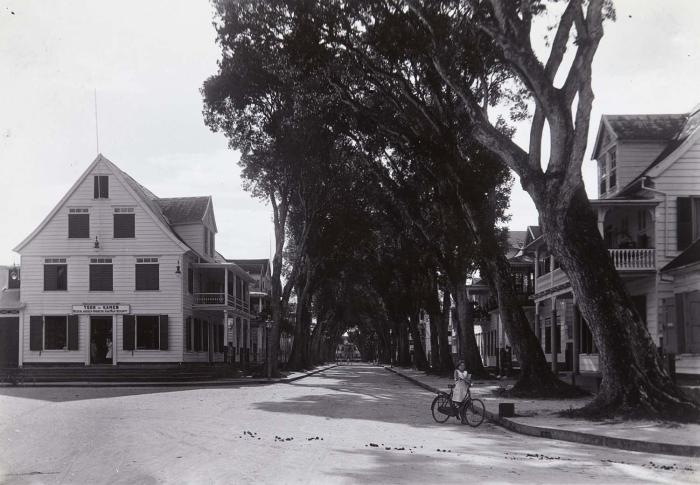
Heerenstraat in Paramaribo with NIGM showroom

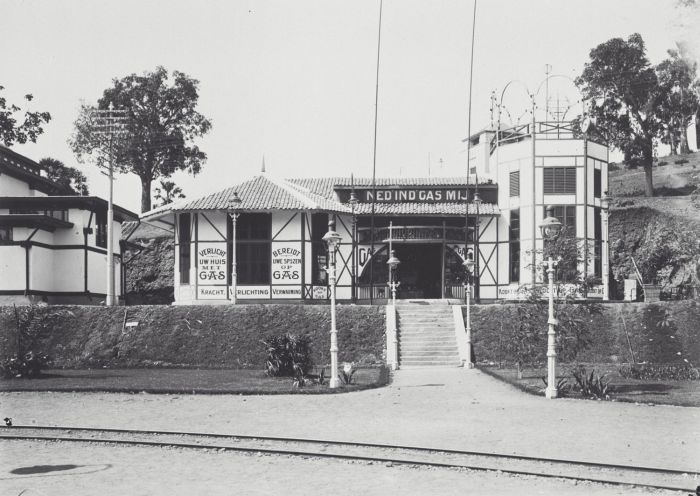
NIGM Pavilion at the Colonial Exhibition in Semarang (1914)

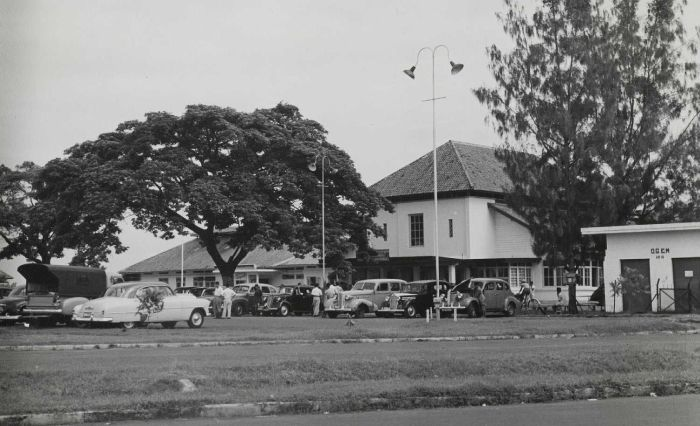
Garuda Indonesian Airways office with an Overseas Gas and Electric Company (OGEM) office on the right
