= Arnold Tilanus =

Dutch politician (1910-1996)

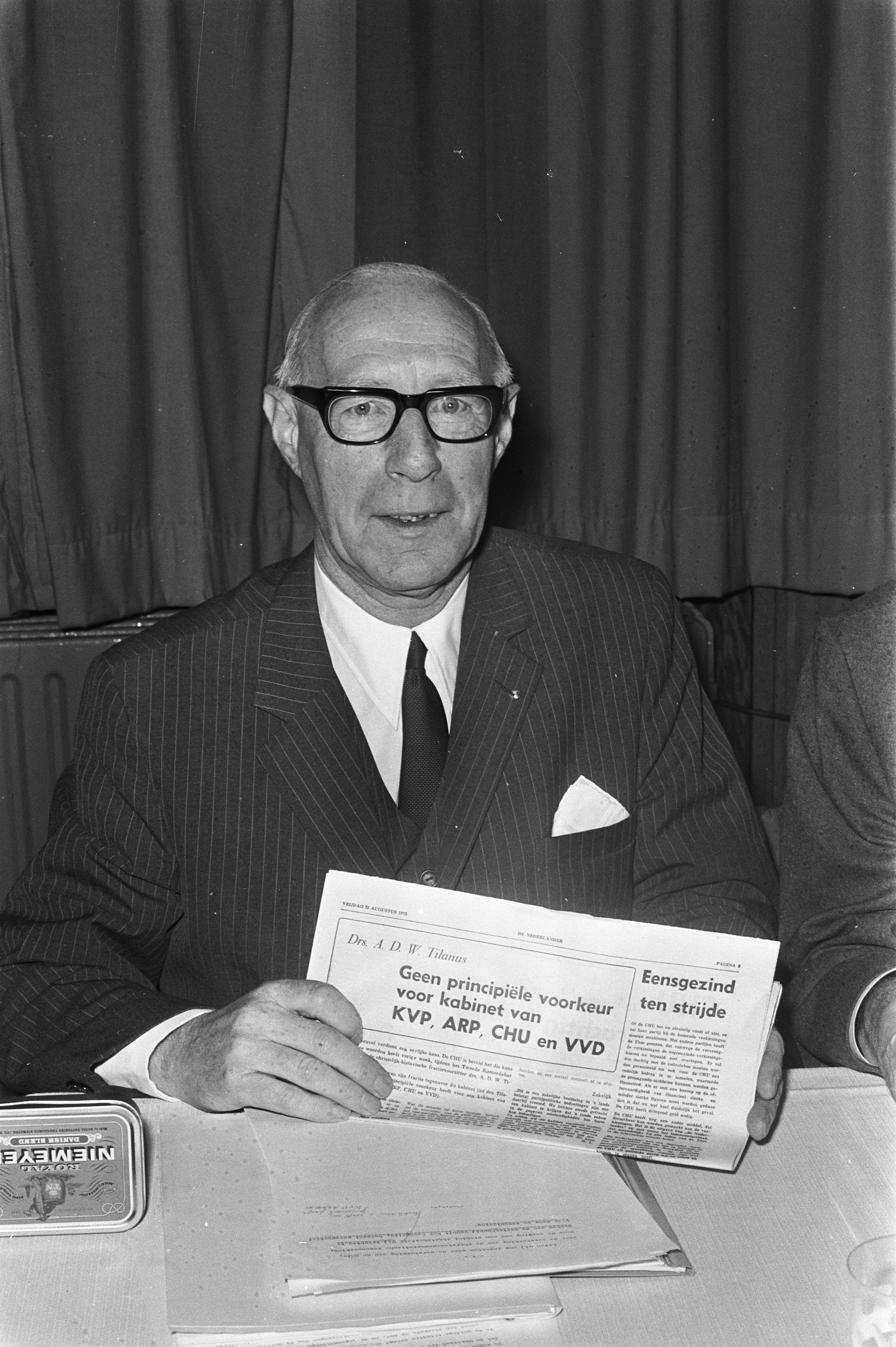
- Arnold Tilanus in 1972

Member of the House of Representatives
- In office 5 June 1963 – 8 June 1977

Personal details
- Born: Arnold Dirk Willem Tilanus; 11 November 1910 Utrecht, Netherlands
- Died: 31 August 1996 (aged 85) Hoogerheide, Netherlands
- Party: CHU
- Spouse: Jeanne van Diemen (m. 1939)
- Children: 3
- Education: Utrecht University

Arnold Dirk Willem Tilanus (11 November 1910 – 31 August 1996) was a Dutch doctor and politician. The son of long-time CHU leader Hendrik Tilanus, he was a member of the Dutch House of Representatives from 1963 to 1977 for the Christian Historical Union (CHU), serving as the CHU's chairman from 1966 to 1968 and its parliamentary and political leader from 1968 to 1969 and from 1972 to 1973.

== Biography ==
Arnold Tilanus was born on 11 November 1910 in Utrecht. His father, Hendrik Tilanus, served as an MP for the Christian Historical Union from 1922 until his death in 1963, and as the CHU's political leader from 1939 to 1963. After completing his secondary education in The Hague, Tilanus had wanted to become an officer in the Royal Netherlands Navy, but was rejected due to wearing glasses, after which he decided to study medicine at Utrecht University in 1932. He graduated in 1938 and completed his medical exam in 1940, becoming a general practitioner in Voorburg that same year. During the German occupation of the Netherlands, Arnold was temporarily imprisoned for aiding Jews. From 1946 to 1949, Tilanus was a medical officer for the Royal Netherlands Army, tasked with the coordination of health checks of conscripted soldiers.

Following the death of his father in 1963, Arnold Tilanus was picked by the CHU to replace him in the House of Representatives, even being assigned the exact same seat in the House chamber as his father. As an MP, he was the CHU's parliamentary spokesperson on health, social affairs, and social work. In 1966, Tilanus became chairman of the CHU, on a platform of reform and further co-operation with the other main Christian parties of the time, the Anti-Revolutionary Party (ARP) and the Catholic People's Party (KVP). He had originally wanted to include the Reformed Political League (GPV) and the Reformed Political Party (SGP) as well, but this proved to be impractical due to especially the SGP's regressive policies towards women.

In October 1966, he set up a task force to modernise the party platform, which produced a report which supported reorienting the CHU's ideology away from a focus on order and support for keeping the Netherlands a Protestant nation in favour of forming a broader people's party, which would combat both secularisation as well as the problems of materialism in the first world and poverty in the poorer parts of the world with policies based on Biblical teachings. Following the CHU's electoral loss in the 1967 Dutch general election, Tilanus met with the chairmen of the ARP and KVP in March, setting up an informal discussion group featuring representatives from all three parties which met twenty times until September 1969.

In 1972, Tilanus became the political leader of the CHU, overseeing a further decline in electoral strength in the 1972 Dutch general election, being almost halved relative to its seat count in 1963. During the 1972-73 Dutch cabinet formation, Tilanus had personally been a proponent of supporting the Den Uyl cabinet, but was overruled by the CHU parliamentary group, leading to the CHU entering opposition while its fellow Christian parties the ARP and KVP did support the new government. In 1973, Tilanus stepped down as political leader of the CHU, and was succeeded by Roelof Kruisinga. Tilanus left the House of Representatives in 1977. Following his retirement from politics, he retreated into private life.

Arnold Tilanus died on 31 August 1996 in Hoogerheide.

== Bibliography ==
- ten Hooven, Marcel; de Jong, Ron (2008). Geschiedenis van de Christelijk-Historische Unie, 1908-1980 (PDF) (in Dutch). Amsterdam: Boom. ISBN 978-90-8506-649-1.
