= Christian Historical Union =

Defunct political party in the Netherlands

Christian Historical Union Christelijk-Historische Unie
- Abbreviation: CHU
- Founded: 9 July 1908
- Dissolved: 11 October 1980
- Merger of: Christian Historical Party; Frisian League
- Merged into: Christian Democratic Appeal
- Headquarters: Wassenaarseweg 7 The Hague
- Youth wing: Christian Historical Youth Organisation
- Think tank: Savornin Lohman Foundation
- Membership: 26.000 (1979)
- Ideology: Social conservatism Christian democracy
- Political position: Centre-right
- Religion: Dutch Reformed Church; Evangelical Lutheran Church; Remonstrants
- European affiliation: European Union of Christian Democrats
- European Parliament group: Christian Democratic Group
- International affiliation: None
- Colours: Dark blue

The Christian Historical Union (Dutch: Christelijk-Historische Unie, CHU) was a Protestant Christian democratic political party in the Netherlands. The CHU is one of the predecessors of the Christian Democratic Appeal (CDA), into which it merged in September 1980.

== History ==
=== 1879–1908: Predecessor parties ===
An important inspiration for the CHU was Guillaume Groen van Prinsterer (1801–1876), who coined the terms "anti-revolutionary" and "Christian-historical". In 1879, the Anti-Revolutionary Party (ARP) was founded as a Protestant mass party by Abraham Kuyper. Unlike previous anti-revolutionary politicians such as Groen van Prinsterer, Kuyper was convinced God's will could be translated to politics. As part of Kuyper's antithesis, the ARP worked together with Roman Catholics in the Coalition, with the goal of achieving equal funding for religious schools (the school struggle). After the 1888 election and the subsequent formation, this strategy resulted in the Mackay cabinet, comprising Anti-revolutionaries and Catholics. This cabinet partially managed to achieve funding for religious schools.

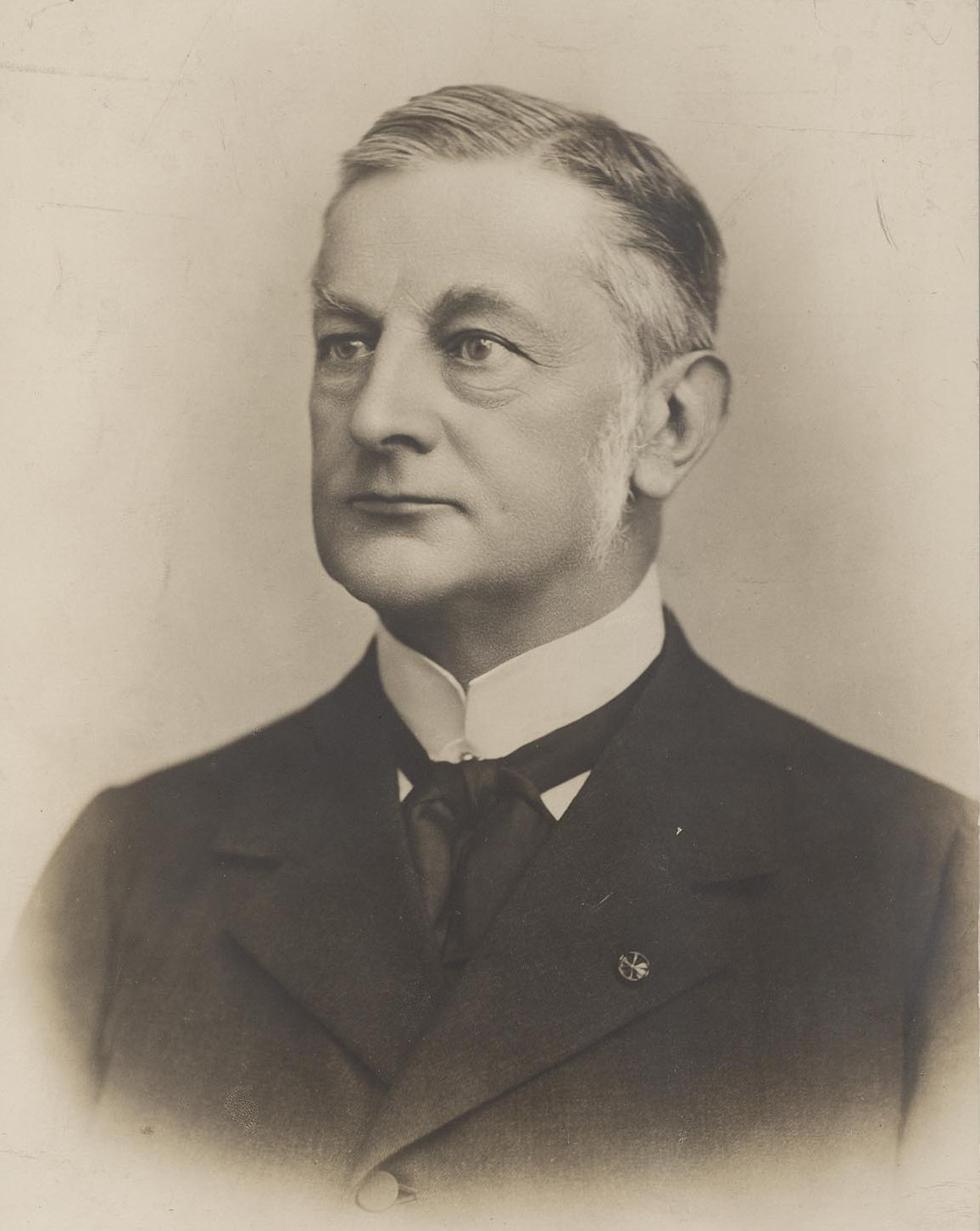
Alexander de Savornin Lohman

Meanwhile, divisions emerged within the ARP, which became increasingly clear over time. Many anti-revolutionary parliamentarians valued their independence from their electorate, leading to the formation of two distinct factions within the parliamentary group. The 1886 Dutch Reformed Church split, instigated by Kuyper, resulted in the Reformed Churches in the Netherlands in 1892. Moreover, some viewed the collaboration with the Catholics as a betrayal of the nation's Protestant identity. The direct cause of a break was a proposal in 1892 by liberal minister Johannes Tak van Poortvliet to expand suffrage. While Kuyper supported this, the more conservative wing of the parliamentary group led by Alexander de Savornin Lohman opposed it. After the 1894 election, this wing formed its own parliamentary group, mostly comprising members with an aristocratic background and who had not followed Kuyper in the Dutch Reformed Church split. When reunification turned out to be impossible, they formed the Free Anti Revolutionary Party (VAR) in 1897.

Around the same time, two other Reformed parties were founded. In 1896, the Christian Historical Voters' League (CHP) was founded, followed by the Frisian League in 1898. Both rejected the secular state, emphasising respectively the Protestant and Dutch Reformed character of the nation. In 1903, the VAR merged with the Christian Historical Voters' League to form the Christian Historical Party. In 1908, the Christian Historical Party merged with the Frisian League to found the Christian Historical Union. The two mergers resulted in a party manifesto, which was a combination of the constitutional views of the VAR and religious views of the other two, although it would emphasise the broader Protestant character advocated by the CHP. Under the influence of the Frisian League, it became more of a testimonial party. Later in 1912, members of the small National Historical Party also joined the CHU.

=== 1908–1918: electoral districts ===
Between 1908 and 1913, the CHU supported a minority Coalition cabinet of ARP and the General League of Roman Catholic Electoral Associations. In the 1909 election the party won 10 seats, two more than the CHP and Frisian League had won in 1905. In the 1913 election the party stayed stable. Between 1913 and 1918 the country was governed by an extraparliamentary cabinet formed by liberals. Its main goal was to implement a constitutional reform combining both male universal suffrage and equal payment for religious schools. At the end of the cabinets term, two CHU ministers joined the cabinet, as they were relatively neutral politicians.

=== 1918–1945 ===
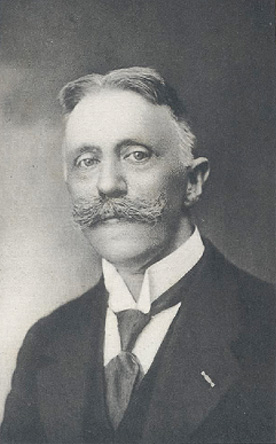
Dirk Jan de Geer

In the 1918 elections, in which male universal suffrage and proportional representation were used for the first time, the party lost three seats. The ARP, CHU and Roman Catholic State Party won a combined fifty seats. The CHU started to cooperate fully in the confessional Coalition. They formed a cabinet led by the Catholic Charles Ruijs de Beerenbrouck. The CHU provided only one minister (De Visser became minister of Education, Arts and Sciences) and two non-partisan sympathisers of the CHU were appointed. During the cabinet's term one CHU member, Dirk Jan de Geer and another CHU sympathiser were appointed as ministers, while the two CHU sympathisers stepped down. In the 1922 election, the party won four seats. The cabinet of Ruijs de Beerenbrouck continued to govern; the CHU supplied two ministers and one non-partisan CHU sympathiser was appointed. During the term one CHU minister, minister of finance De Geer, stepped down after the budget of the ministry of the Navy had been rejected. In the 1925 election the party remained stable at 11 seats. A party which was closely related to the CHU, the HGS, an orthodox version of the CHU, also won one seat. Another RKSP-ARP-CHU cabinet was formed, now led by Hendrikus Colijn; the CHU supplied two ministers. In 1925, the cabinet fell prematurely because of a motion supported by the CHU parliamentary party. Each year the anti-Papist Reformed Political Party proposed a motion to remove the Dutch representative at the Holy See (a symbolic motion to show their opposition to the Pope), which was supported by the CHU. In 1925, the left-liberal Free-thinking Democratic League and socialist Social Democratic Workers' Party supported this motion because they saw it as an opportunity to bring about the downfall of the cabinet and form a progressive coalition after the election. After lengthy formation talks an extraparliamentary cabinet was formed, led by De Geer of the CHU, with one other CHU member appointed and one further CHU member joining during the cabinet's lifetime. De Geer was chosen because he was seen as a reliable administrator and a less divisive figure. In the 1929 election the party remained stable at 11 seats. It cooperated in a new Coalition cabinet led by Ruijs de Beerenbrouck, supplying two ministers, with one CHU sympathiser also serving as a minister.

After the 1933 election, in which the party lost one seat, another Coalition cabinet led by Colijn was formed, which was joined by members of the liberal Free-thinking Democratic League and the Liberal State Party. The CHU supplied only one minister and a further CHU member was appointed minister during the cabinet's term, who left after a cabinet crisis. During the 1930s, a group of the party's younger members, including Piet Lieftinck began to develop support for state intervention in the economy and form a Christian basis for this intervention on basis of the work of the theologian Karl Barth. In the 1937 election the party lost two additional seats, leaving eight. The party continued to govern in an ARP-RKSP-CHU coalition. In 1939, a national cabinet was formed with the SDAP and the three confessional parties. De Geer, as a reliable, respected administrator, led this cabinet. During World War II, De Geer's position became less tenable, as he attempted to negotiate a peace with the Germans against the will of the government. When the Dutch government went into exile he was replaced by ARP member Pieter Sjoerds Gerbrandy and the CHU provided one minister in these cabinets in exile.

=== 1945–1980 ===
After the Second World War, prominent CHU politicians wanted to end the pillarisation of Dutch politics. Some wanted to unite the CHU with the ARP, others, like Piet Lieftinck, joined the new social democratic Labour Party (PvdA).

Between 1945 and 1948, the CHU was marginalised politically as the re-founded Catholic People's Party (KVP) rejected cooperation with the confessional parties in favour of cooperation with the newly founded Labour Party (PvdA). Some prominent progressive CHU members left the CHU to join this new PvdA. It was kept out of the progressive Schermerhorn–Drees cabinet. In the 1946 elections, it kept its eight seats, which it also had before the war. The CHU was also kept out of the first Beel cabinet which also just consisted of the KVP and PvdA.

After the 1948 election (in which the party won one seat), it was invited to join the cabinet again. It joined the broad basis Drees–Van Schaik cabinet which combined the KVP, PvdA, CHU and the conservative liberal VVD, that is every major party except for the Communist Party of the Netherlands and the Anti-Revolutionary Party. These parties were excluded because they opposed the major reforms the cabinets were implementing, including the welfare state, in the case of the CPN, and the decolonisation of the Dutch East Indies in the case of the ARP. The CHU endorsed both these policies, creating considerable conflict internally. The CHU parliamentary group in the Senate voted for the independence of Indonesia. The CHU provided one minister, which was expanded to two after a 1951 cabinet crisis. After the 1952 election, a new cabinet was formed and the VVD was replaced by the ARP, while the CHU retained two ministers. In the 1956 election, the party retained the same percentage of vote, but due to the expansion of parliament it gets 13 seats (out of 150). A new cabinet was formed with the same composition and the CHU retained its two ministers. In 1959 the cabinet fell prematurely. A caretaker cabinet was formed by ARP, KVP and CHU.

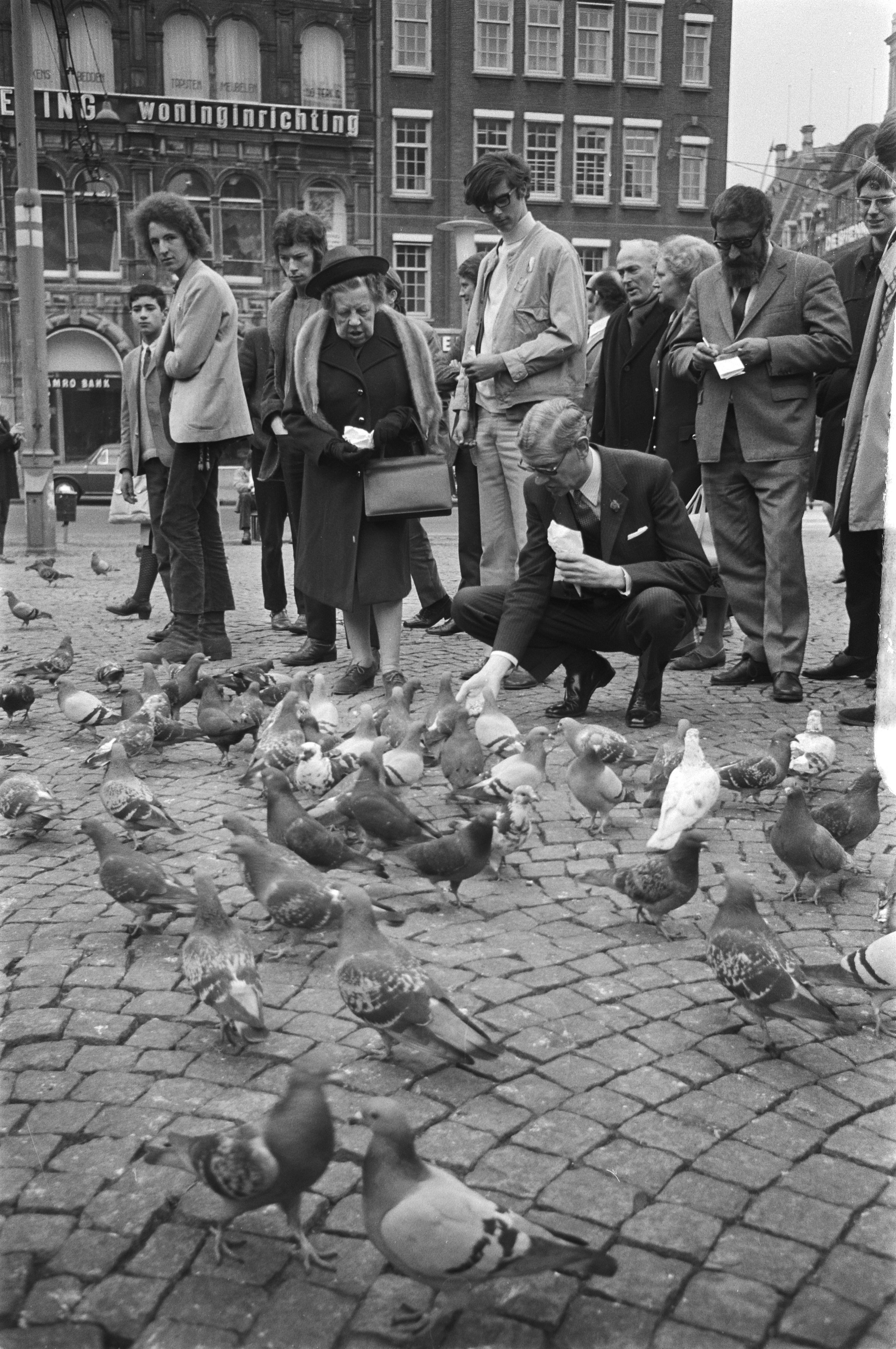
Freule Wttewaall van Stoetwegen and Bé Udink on Dam Square, Amsterdam, during the 1971 election campaign. By visiting the National Monument on Dam Square, which at the time was a meeting place for hippies, the party wanted to signal the party kept up with the times.

After the 1959 election (in which the party lost one seat), the De Quay cabinet is formed by KVP, ARP, CHU and VVD. The CHU still supplied two ministers. After the 1963 elections, in which the CHU gained one seat, the cabinet continued. In 1965 this cabinet fell, and a new cabinet was formed, without the CHU and the VVD, but with the PvdA. This cabinet fell after one year. In the 1967 election campaign, the ARP, CHU and KVP declared that they would continue to govern together. The CHU lost one seat but still supplied two ministers in the new KVP-ARP-CHU-VVD coalition De Jong cabinet. During this period the differences between the ARP and CHU became more pronounced, with the ARP becoming more progressive and the CHU remaining more conservative. In the 1971 election the party lost 3 seats. It joined a coalition cabinet of the same parties, now joined by the moderate Democratic Socialists '70, which broke away from the PvdA. The cabinet fell after one year. In the 1972 election campaign, the CHU lost three seats, and was left with seven. Furthermore, CHU was blocked from the newly formed cabinet by the PvdA and its allies, which cooperated with the KVP and ARP.

Meanwhile, a process of merger had started between the KVP, ARP and CHU, under pressure of poor election results. In 1974, they founded a federation called the Christian Democratic Appeal (CDA). In the 1977 election, they campaigned together under the name of the CDA.

The power of the CHU current within the CDA is relatively small. Although there are some prominent CDA politicians with a background in the CHU, the better organised KVP and ARP are far stronger currents within the party.

== Name ==
The CHU derived its name "Christian Historical Union" from its combination of conservatism, the orientation to that which has historically grown with Protestant Christianity. The label conservative was already taken by a parliamentary group of monarchists and colonialists, who fell from favour during the late 19th century. In its early years, the terms anti-revolutionary and Christian-historical were used interchangeably. With the split between the Anti-Revolutionary Party and the CHU the terms began to gain their own separate meanings. Furthermore, the party styled itself a loose union of individual MPs and municipal caucuses and therefore used the term Union instead of party.

== Ideology and issues ==
The CHU lacked a coherent political ideology as it was formed by politicians who emphasised their own independent position. Furthermore, many times it served as the counterpart of the ARP:

- Between 1908 and 1918, the party served as the more conservative of the two main Protestant parties. It was more anti-papal than the ARP, which was more oriented towards cooperation with Catholics. It was also more sceptical about universal suffrage.
- In the period between 1918 and 1940, the differences between the ARP and CHU were mainly religious, with parties advocating similar policies, like a strong defence and fiscal conservatism. With the ARP representing the Reformed Churches in the Netherlands and the CHU conservative parts of the Dutch Reformed Church and other non-aligned churches. Arguably, the CHU inclined to be “both more sophisticated and (...) more dogmatic” than the ARP
- Between 1945 and 1960, the differences between the ARP and the CHU were focused on the issue of decolonisation of the Dutch East Indies: while the ARP was vehemently against this, the CHU was pragmatic about the issue. It presented itself as a "centre party" and was described in the media as such.
- In the 1960s and 1970s, the ARP became more progressive, while the CHU began to emphasise its conservatism. However it is interesting that the CHU did not embrace a specific political label as was emphasised in a rapport published in 1967 that described the party as being neither conservative, progressive, right-wing or left-wing, but a political party that wanted to serve all the people. The left wing of the party wanted the party to become a progressive party and close co-operation with the Labour Party and the other Christian Democratic parties; however, the majority of the party wanted to continue the centrist course.

Generally the political course of the party can be seen as (soft) conservative and Christian democratic. It saw the government as the servant of God and emphasised the special role of the Netherlands, with its history of Protestantism. The CHU had relatively constant positions on several issues:

- The party was conservative in social and ethical matters, rejecting divorce and protecting the position of religious schools. At the same time they supported public schools, believing they must be based on Christian principles. After the Second World War, it embraced a more socially progressive stand and supported the creation of a welfare state.
- The party took a strong position in favour of law and order, and it favoured the Dutch monarchy
- The party was fiscally conservative, combining support for the welfare state with tight budgetary controls.

=== Social wing ===
Although most CHU members of parliament were conservatives, some others were more moderate and belonged to the social wing of the party. The more socially oriented MP's were: Johan Reinhardt Snoeck Henkemans (1862–1945), Jan Rudolph Slotemaker de Bruïne (1869–1941), Frida Katz (1885–1963), Jouke Bakker (1873–1956), Piet Lieftinck (1902–1989), Henk Kikkert (1912–1988), Cor van Mastrigt (1909–1997), freule Wttewaall van Stoetwegen (1901–1986), Arnold Tilanus (1910–1996), Coos Huijsen (*1939), Ernst van Eeghen (1920–2007), Wim Deetman (*1945) and Nellien de Ruiter (1926–2000). The highly popular Wttewaall van Stoetwegen, long-time member of parliament after the Second World War and befriended with the queen, was considered reasonably progressive on social issues (decolonisation of the Dutch Indies, women emancipation, housing, prison reforms, welfare), as was her colleague, the unionist, Henk Kikkert (welfare, housing).

== Organisation ==
=== National organisation ===
The party had a federal organisation with strong local branches and an independent parliamentary party, without party discipline. It has been classified as an elite party.

=== Linked organisations ===
The party published the magazine "C.H. Nederlander" ("Christian Historical Dutchman"). Its youth organisation was the Christelijk-Historische Jongeren Organisatie (English: Christian Historical Youth Organisation Anti-Revolutionary Youth Studyclubs). Its scientific institute was the De Savornin Lohman foundation.

=== International organisations ===
Internationally, the CHU was a relatively isolated party. In the European Parliament, its members sat in the Christian Democratic faction.

=== Pillarised organisations ===
The party had weak ties to many Protestant organisations, such as the Dutch Reformed Church, the Protestant broadcaster NCRV, the employers' organisation NCW, the trade union CNV and the Christian Farmers' Organisation. Together these organisations formed the Protestant pillar, over which the Anti-Revolutionary Party had far more control than the CHU. Rather than use a pillar, the CHU appealed to unaffiliated conservative Protestants. The party did own its own newspaper, De Nederlander.

The CHU had a separate party organisation for women, Centrale van Christelijk Historische Vrouwengroepen.

== Leadership ==
- Party chair
  - Alexander de Savornin Lohman (9 July 1908 – 11 May 1910)
  - Johannes Theodoor de Visser (11 May 1910 – 12 September 1918)
  - Jan Schokking (12 September 1918 – 4 Augustus 1925)
  - Jan Rudolph Slotemaker de Bruïne (4 Augustus 1925 – 11 March 1927)
  - Jan Schokking (11 March 1927 – 1 March 1932)
  - Jan Rudolph Slotemaker de Bruïne (1 March 1932 – 30 June 1933)
  - Dirk Jan de Geer (30 June 1933 – 10 Augustus 1939)
  - Hendrik Tilanus (10 Augustus 1939 – 9 July 1958)
  - Henk Beernink (9 July 1958 – 19 March 1966)
  - Arnold Tilanus (19 March 1966 – 5 October 1968)
  - Johan van Hulst (5 October 1968 – 19 February 1972)
  - Otto van Verschuer (19 February 1972 – 19 November 1977)
  - Luck van Leeuwen (19 November 1977 – 11 October 1980)
- Party leader
  - Alexander de Savornin Lohman (9 July 1908 – 8 February 1921)
  - Johannes Theodoor de Visser (8 February 1921 – 8 July 1929)
  - Dirk Jan de Geer (8 July 1929 – 3 September 1940)
  - Hendrik Tilanus (3 September 1940 – 15 May 1963)
  - Henk Beernink (15 May 1963 – 5 April 1967)
  - Jur Mellema (5 April 1967 – 20 June 1970)
  - Bé Udink (20 June 1970 – 6 July 1971)
  - Jur Mellema (6 July 1971 – 1 April 1972)
  - Arnold Tilanus (1 April 1972 – 1 July 1973)
  - Roelof Kruisinga (1 July 1973 – 25 May 1977)

== Election results ==
=== House of Representatives ===
Election	Lead candidate	List	Votes	%	Seats	Government	Ref.
1909	n/a				12 / 100		
1913	n/a				9 / 100	In opposition	
1917	n/a				9 / 100	In opposition	
1918	Alexander de Savorin Lohman	List			7 / 100	In government	
1922	Jan Schokking	List			11 / 100	In government	
1925	Jan Schokking	List	305,587	9.9	11 / 100	In government	
1929	Dirk Jan de Geer	List	335,800	10.6	11 / 100	In government	
1933	Dirk Jan de Geer	List	339,813	9.2	10 / 100	In government	
1937	Dirk Jan de Geer	List	302,829	7.5	8 / 100	In government (1937–1945)	
1937	Dirk Jan de Geer	List	302,829	7.5	8 / 100	In opposition (1945–1946)	
1946	Hendrik Tilanus	List	373,217	7.9	8 / 100	In opposition	
1948	Hendrik Tilanus	List	453,136	9.2	9 / 100	In government	
1952	Hendrik Tilanus	List	476,188	8.9	9 / 100	In government	
1956	Hendrik Tilanus	List	482,915	8.4	13 / 150	In government	
1959	Hendrik Tilanus	List	486,429	8.1	12 / 150	In government	
1963	Henk Beernink	List	536,782	8.6	13 / 150	In government (1963–1965)	
1963	Henk Beernink	List	536,782	8.6	13 / 150	In opposition (1965–1967)	
1967	Henk Beernink	List	560,467	8.2	12 / 150	In government	
1971	Bé Udink	List	399,164	6.3	10 / 150	In government	
1972	Arnold Tilanus	List	354,463	4.8	7 / 150	In opposition	

== Electorate ==
The electorate of the CHU has seen three decisive shifts, especially in its relation with the ARP, the other Protestant party. Although dates are given here, the changes were gradual

- Between 1908 and 1917, the CHU appealed to the aristocracy, the people with double names, nobility, land owners, high officers and high-ranking civil servants, who opposed universal suffrage.
- Between 1917 and 1967, the CHU appealed to members of the Dutch Reformed Church.
- Between 1967 and 1977, in the time of secularisation and depillarisation the party retained its conservative image.
