= Frida Katz =

Dutch lawyer and politician

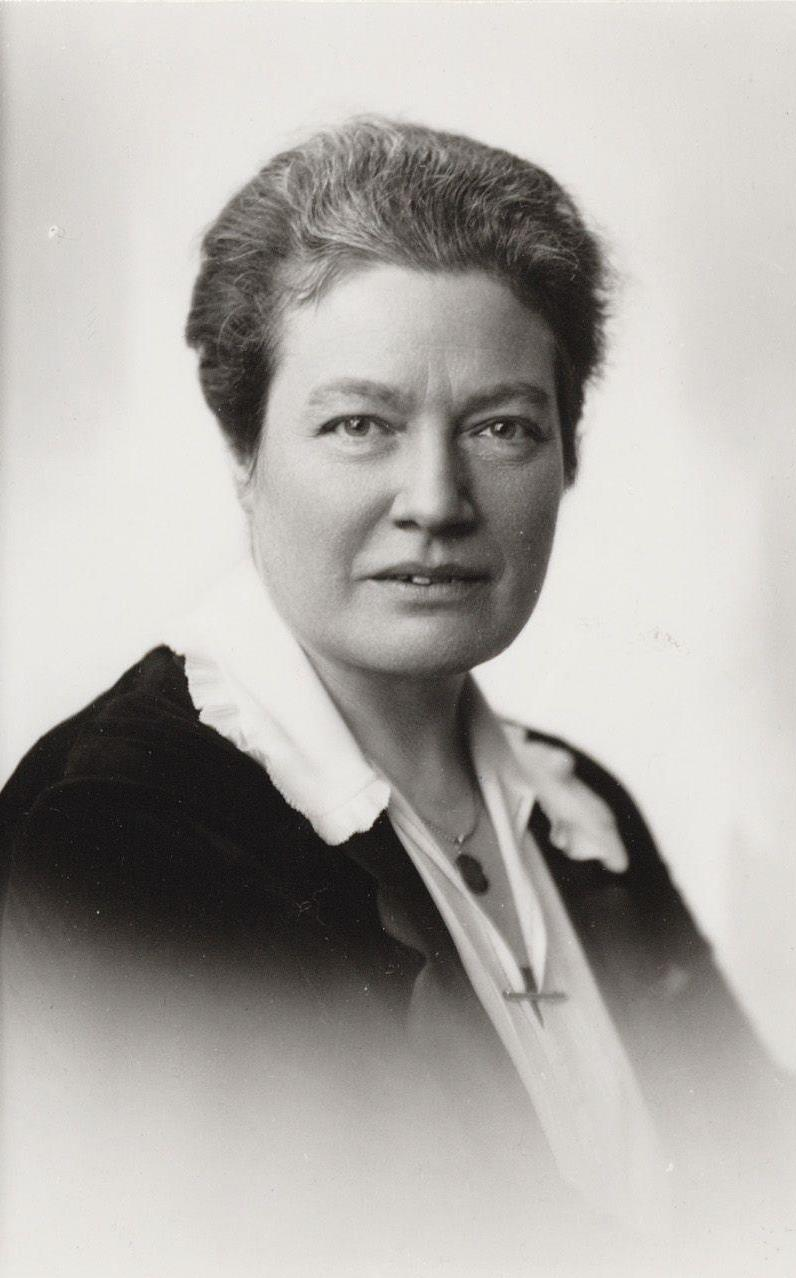
Frida Katz, 1932

Cornelia Frida Katz, (Amsterdam, 29 July 1885 – Aerdenhout, 30 March 1963) was a Dutch lawyer and Christian Historical Union politician. She was the first female member of Parliament to come from a Protestant Christian party (1922). She was also a member of the municipal council of Amsterdam. Katz was a supporter of the introduction of women's suffrage; she joined the women's movement and became order commissioner at the International Congress for Women's Suffrage in 1904 and in 1909 she became a member of the Amsterdam Department of the Women's Suffrage Union. After her wedding in 1937, she became known was Cornelia Frida barones Mackay-Katz.
