= 1971 Dutch cabinet formation =

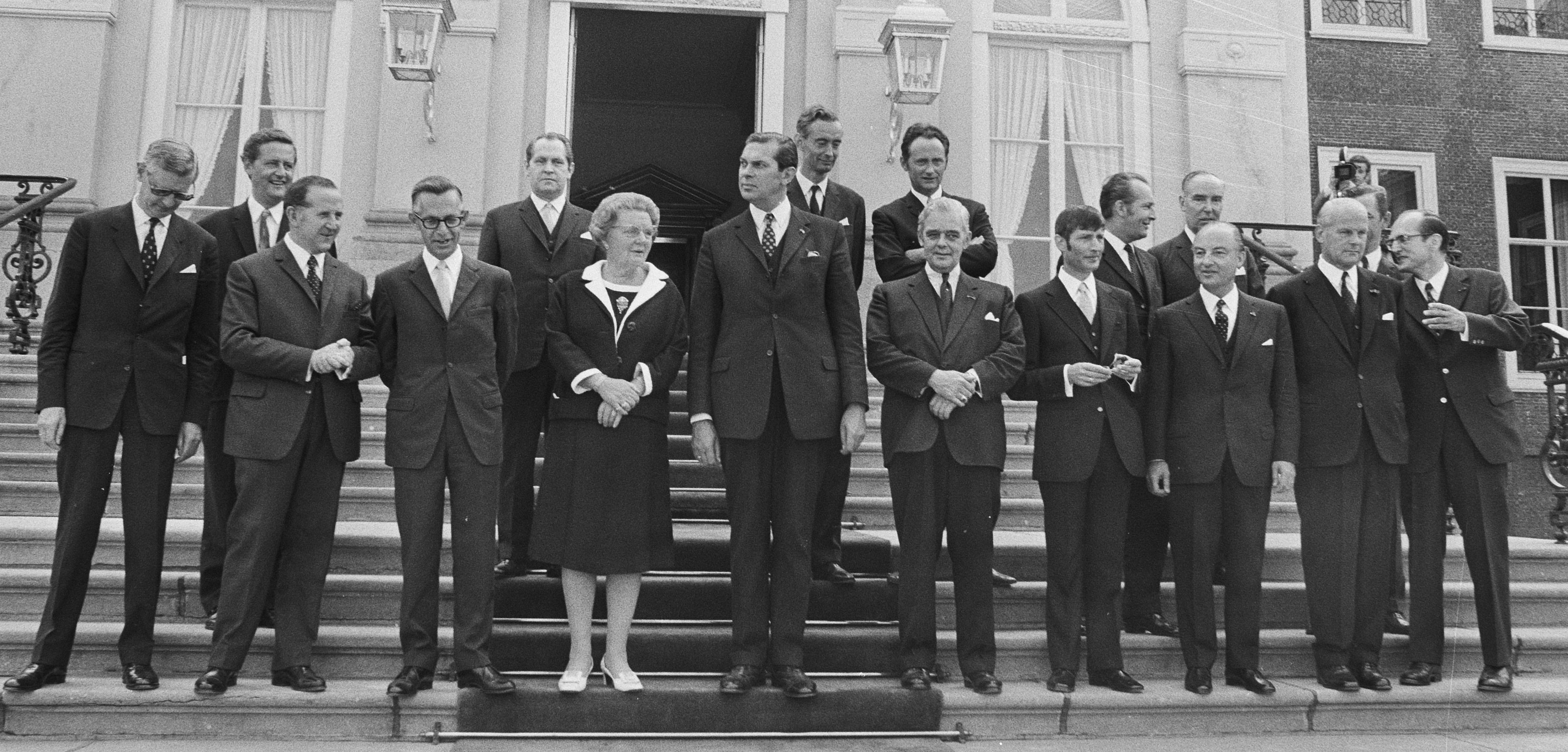
The ministers of the First Biesheuvel cabinet with Queen Juliana at the centre

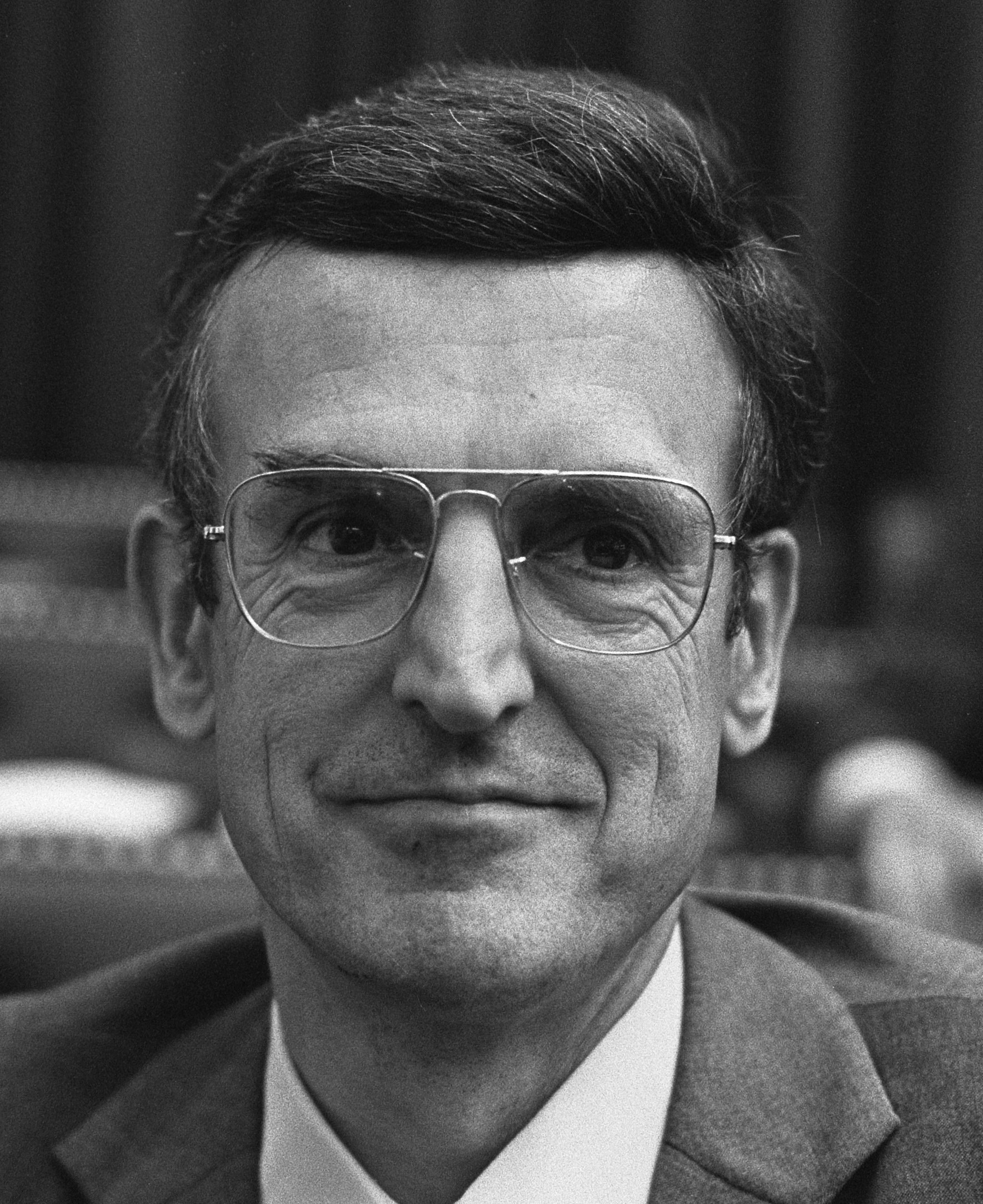
Willem Drees Jr.

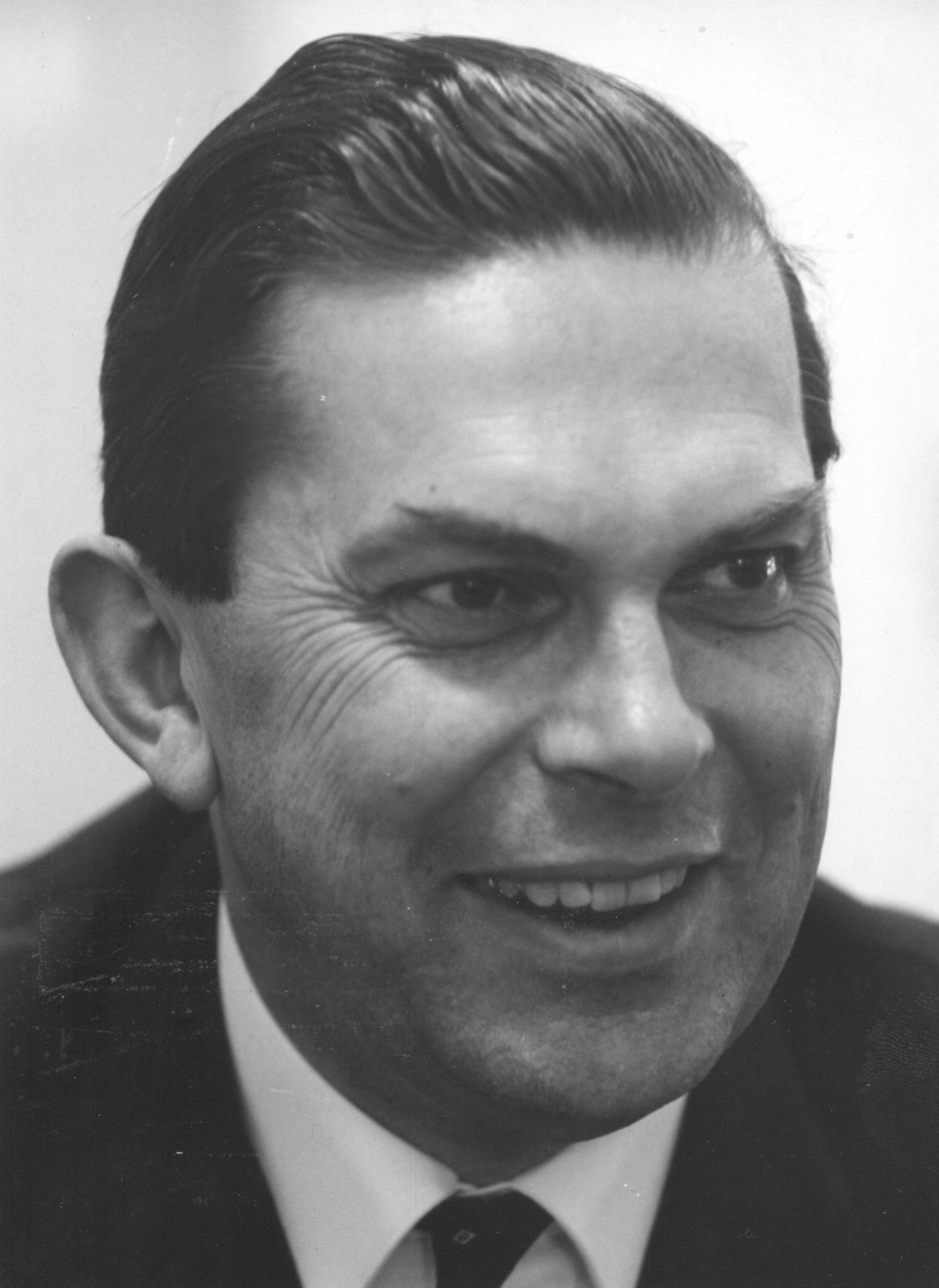
Barend Biesheuvel

The 1971 Dutch cabinet formation followed the general election of 28 April 1971 and resulted, after 54 days of negotiations, in the formation of the First Biesheuvel cabinet.

== Background ==
The election took place after the completion of the term of the De Jong cabinet, led by KVP politician Piet de Jong. Contrary to expectations, the cabinet completed its full term in office.

The four governing parties — the KVP, the VVD, the ARP, and the CHU — campaigned on continuing the existing coalition.

Within the Labour Party (PvdA), a faction dissatisfied with the increasingly left-wing course of the party under the influence of New Left split away under the leadership of Willem Drees Jr. This group contested the election as Democratic Socialists '70 (DS'70).

The KVP selected Minister of Education Gerard Veringa rather than Prime Minister De Jong as its lijsttrekker (lead candidate). The KVP parliamentary group refused to nominate De Jong again because it would have increased the likelihood of his return as prime minister, while the PvdA had indicated it was unwilling to govern with him again. Since the KVP did not want to permanently exclude the social democrats from coalition options, De Jong was effectively sidelined.

During his premiership, De Jong was often criticised in the media as lacking decisiveness and being old-fashioned. In later decades, however, his reputation was reassessed more positively by historians.

=== Election results ===
DS'70 entered the House of Representatives with eight seats. The PvdA gained two seats and became the largest party for the first time since 1956.

The KVP lost seven seats, the CHU and ARP each lost two, and the VVD lost one seat. As a result, the three Christian parties together with the VVD no longer held a parliamentary majority for the first time.

Another major winner was Democrats 66 (D'66), which increased its representation from seven to eleven seats. The Farmers' Party of Hendrik Koekoek lost six of its seven seats.

== Parliamentary debate ==
Shortly before the election, the House of Representatives had adopted the Kolfschoten motion, which allowed parliament to nominate an informateur or formateur itself.

Following the election, the House debated how the cabinet formation should proceed. Most parties preferred to keep coalition options open. The outgoing coalition had lost its majority, while a centre-left coalition between the PvdA and KVP was mathematically possible but politically sensitive due to tensions since the Night of Schmelzer.

The position of DS'70 was also uncertain. Hans van Mierlo, leader of D'66, was the only parliamentary leader to make a formal nomination under the Kolfschoten procedure. He proposed PvdA leader Joop den Uyl as formateur of a progressive minority cabinet, but this proposal was rejected by a majority of the House.

== Royal consultations ==
Following the inconclusive parliamentary debate, the formation returned to the traditional royal role. Queen Juliana consulted parliamentary leaders and advisers before appointing Catholic professor Piet Steenkamp as informateur.

Steenkamp first explored a centre-left coalition, but this proved unsuccessful. A solution was eventually found by inviting DS'70 to join a coalition with the KVP, VVD, ARP, and CHU, which DS'70 accepted.

The informateur established two committees composed of representatives from the five prospective coalition parties to resolve disputes, particularly on public finances and abortion policy. Although negotiations were difficult, agreement was eventually reached under future prime minister Barend Biesheuvel.

Biesheuvel had previously failed to form a cabinet after the 1967 election. Although the KVP remained the largest coalition party, it did not supply the prime minister. At the time, it was not yet customary for the largest governing party to hold the premiership, and the KVP lacked a clear candidate after De Jong had been sidelined.

== Sources ==
- Maas, P. F. Kabinetsformaties 1959–1973. The Hague: Staatsuitgeverij, 1982. ISBN 9012039983
- "Kabinetsformatie 1971". Parlement.com.
