= Hendrik Tilanus =

Dutch politician

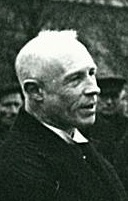
Hendrik Willem Tilanus in 1946

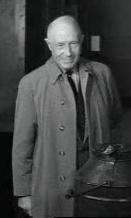
Tilanus in 1956

Hendrik Willem Tilanus (Deventer, 5 October 1884 – The Hague, 16 February 1966) was a Dutch politician and leader of the Christian Historical Union party from 1939 to 1963.
