= Kees Staf =

Dutch politician (1905–1973)

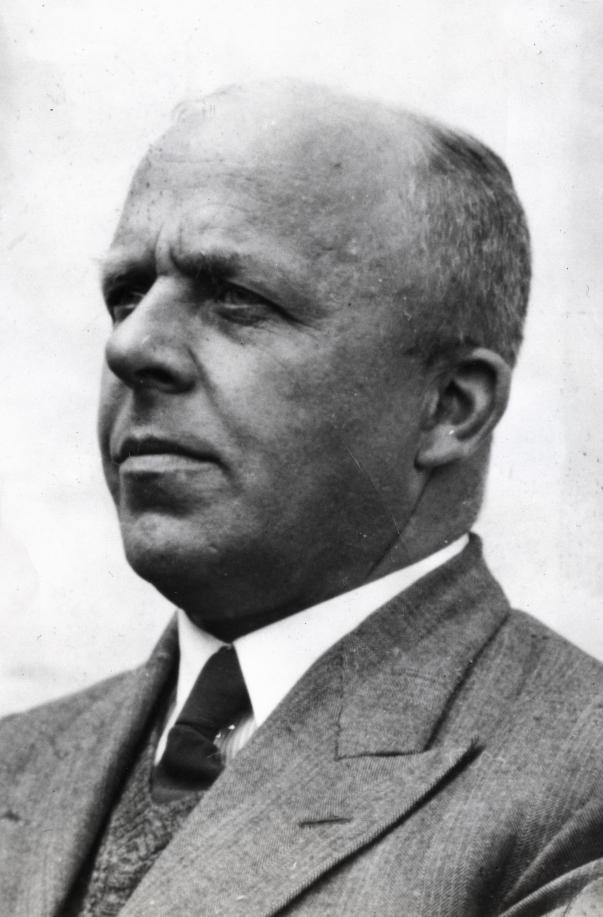
- Staf in 1950

Member of the Senate
- In office 9 June 1959 – 20 September 1960
- Parliamentary group: Christian Historical Union

Minister of Agriculture, Fisheries and Food Supplies
- In office 22 December 1958 – 19 May 1959
- Prime Minister: Louis Beel
- Preceded by: Anne Vondeling
- Succeeded by: Victor Marijnen as Minister of Agriculture and Fisheries
- In office 1 January 1958 – 13 January 1958; Ad interim
- Prime Minister: Willem Drees
- Preceded by: Sicco Mansholt
- Succeeded by: Anne Vondeling

Minister of Defence
- In office 13 October 1956 – 19 May 1959
- Prime Minister: Willem Drees (1956–1958); Louis Beel (1956–1958)
- Preceded by: Himself as Minister of War and the Navy
- Succeeded by: Sidney J. van den Bergh

Minister of Colonial Affairs
- In office 18 July 1956 – 16 February 1957
- Prime Minister: Willem Drees
- Preceded by: Willem Kernkamp
- Succeeded by: Gerard Helders

Member of the House of Representatives
- In office 3 July 1956 – 3 October 1956
- In office 15 July 1952 – 2 September 1952
- Parliamentary group: Christian Historical Union

Minister of War and the Navy
- In office 15 March 1951 – 13 October 1956
- Prime Minister: Willem Drees
- Preceded by: Hans s'Jacob
- Succeeded by: Himself as Minister of Defence

Personal details
- Born: Cornelis Staf; 23 April 1905 Ede, Netherlands
- Died: 10 September 1973 (aged 68) Arnhem, Netherlands
- Party: Christian Historical Union (from 1946)
- Spouse: Bartha Moll (m. 1931)
- Children: 2 daughters
- Education: National Agricultural and Forestry College (Bachelor of Science in Agriculture, Master of Science in Engineering); Technische Hochschule Breslau (Master of Engineering)
- Occupation: Politician · Civil servant · Agronomist · Agricultural engineer · Civil engineer · Economist · Researcher · Businessman · Corporate director · Nonprofit director

Military service
- Allegiance: Netherlands
- Branch/service: Royal Netherlands East Indies Army
- Years of service: 1928–1929 (Conscription); 1929–1935 (Reserve)
- Rank: Sergeant
- Unit: Corps of Engineers
- Battles/wars: Interbellum

Cornelis "Kees" Staf (23 April 1905 – 10 September 1973) was a Dutch politician of the defunct Christian Historical Union (CHU) party now merged into the Christian Democratic Appeal (CDA) party and businessman.

== Biography ==
Staf worked as student researcher at the National Agricultural and Forestry College from June 1926 until July 1928. Staf served in the Royal Netherlands East Indies Army as a Sergeant in the Corps of Engineers stationed in Sawah Besar from December 1928 until December 1929. Staf worked for the land reclamation Dutch Heidemaatschappij Company from December 1929 until January 1941 and was CEO and Chairman of the board of directors from November 1939 until May 1941, and he also worked as a civil servant for the province of Gelderland from August 1939 until May 1940.

On 24 January 1951 the Cabinet Drees–Van Schaik fell and continued to serve in a demissionary capacity until the cabinet formation of 1951 when it was replaced by the Cabinet Drees I with Staf appointed as Minister of War and the Navy, taking office on 15 March 1951. Staf was elected as a Member of the House of Representatives after the election of 1952, taking office on 15 July 1952. After the cabinet formation of 1952 Staf continued as Minister of War and the Navy in the Cabinet Drees II, taking office on 2 September 1952. After the election of 1956 Staf returned as a Member of the House of Representatives, taking office on 3 July 1956. Staf was appointed as Minister of Colonial Affairs following the death of Willem Kernkamp and dual served in both positions, taking office on 18 July 1956. After the cabinet formation of 1956 Staf continued in the post as the newly renamed Minister of Defence in the Cabinet Drees III, taking office on 13 October 1956. On 16 February 1957 Staf resigned as Minister of Colonial Affairs following the appointment of Gerard Helders but continued as Minister of Defence. Staf served as acting Minister of Agriculture, Fisheries and Food Supplies following the appointment of Sicco Mansholt as the first European Commissioner from the Netherlands, serving from 1 January 1958 until 13 January 1958. The Cabinet Drees III fell on 11 December 1958 and continued to serve in a demissionary capacity until it was replaced by the caretaker Cabinet Beel II with Staf continuing as Minister of Defence and also took over as Minister of Agriculture, Fisheries and Food Supplies, taking office on 22 December 1958. In January 1959 Staf announced that he would not stand for the election of 1959. Following the cabinet formation of 1959 Staf per his own request asked not to be considered for a cabinet post in the new cabinet, the Cabinet Beel II was replaced by the Cabinet De Quay on 19 May 1959.

Staf remained in active politics, he became a Member of the Senate after the death of Gualthérus Kolff, taking office on 9 June 1959. In August 1960 Staf announced that he would not stand for the Senate election of 1960 and continued to serve as a backbencher until the end of the parliamentary term on 20 September 1960.

== Decorations ==
Honours
| Ribbon bar | Honour | Country | Date | Comment |
| | Grand Officer of the Order of the House of Orange | Netherlands | 11 July 1954 | |
| | Grand Cross of the Order of Leopold II | Belgium | 8 March 1957 | |
| | Commander of the Order of Merit | Portugal | 17 November 1957 | |
| | Grand Officer of the Order of the Oak Crown | Luxembourg | 28 April 1958 | |
| | Commander of the Order of the Netherlands Lion | Netherlands | 9 June 1959 | |
| | Grand Officer of the Legion of Honour | France | 6 September 1963 | |
| | Grand Officer of the Order of Orange-Nassau | Netherlands | 30 April 1966 | |

Political offices
| Preceded by Hans s'Jacob | Minister of War and the Navy; 1951–1956 | Succeeded by Himself as Minister of Defence |
| Preceded by Willem Kernkamp | Minister of Colonial Affairs; 1956–1957 | Succeeded by Gerard Helders |
| Preceded by Himself as Minister of War and the Navy | Minister of Defence; 1956–1959 | Succeeded by Sidney J. van den Bergh |
| Preceded by Sicco Mansholt | Minister of Agriculture, Fisheries and Food Supplies; 1958; Ad interim 1958–1959 | Succeeded by Anne Vondeling |
| Preceded by Anne Vondeling | Minister of Agriculture, Fisheries and Food Supplies; 1958; Ad interim 1958–1959 | Succeeded by Victor Marijnen as Minister of Agriculture and Fisheries |
Business positions
| Unknown | COO of the Dutch Heidemaatschappij Company; 1937–1939 | Unknown |
| Unknown | CEO and Chairman of the Board of directors of the Dutch Heidemaatschappij Company; 1939–1941 | Unknown |
| Unknown | Chairman of the Supervisory board of the Dutch Heidemaatschappij Company; 1959–1961 | Unknown |
| Unknown | CEO and Chairman of the Board of directors of the Dutch Heidemaatschappij Company; 1961–1970 | Unknown |
