= Anne Vondeling =

Dutch politician (1916–1979)

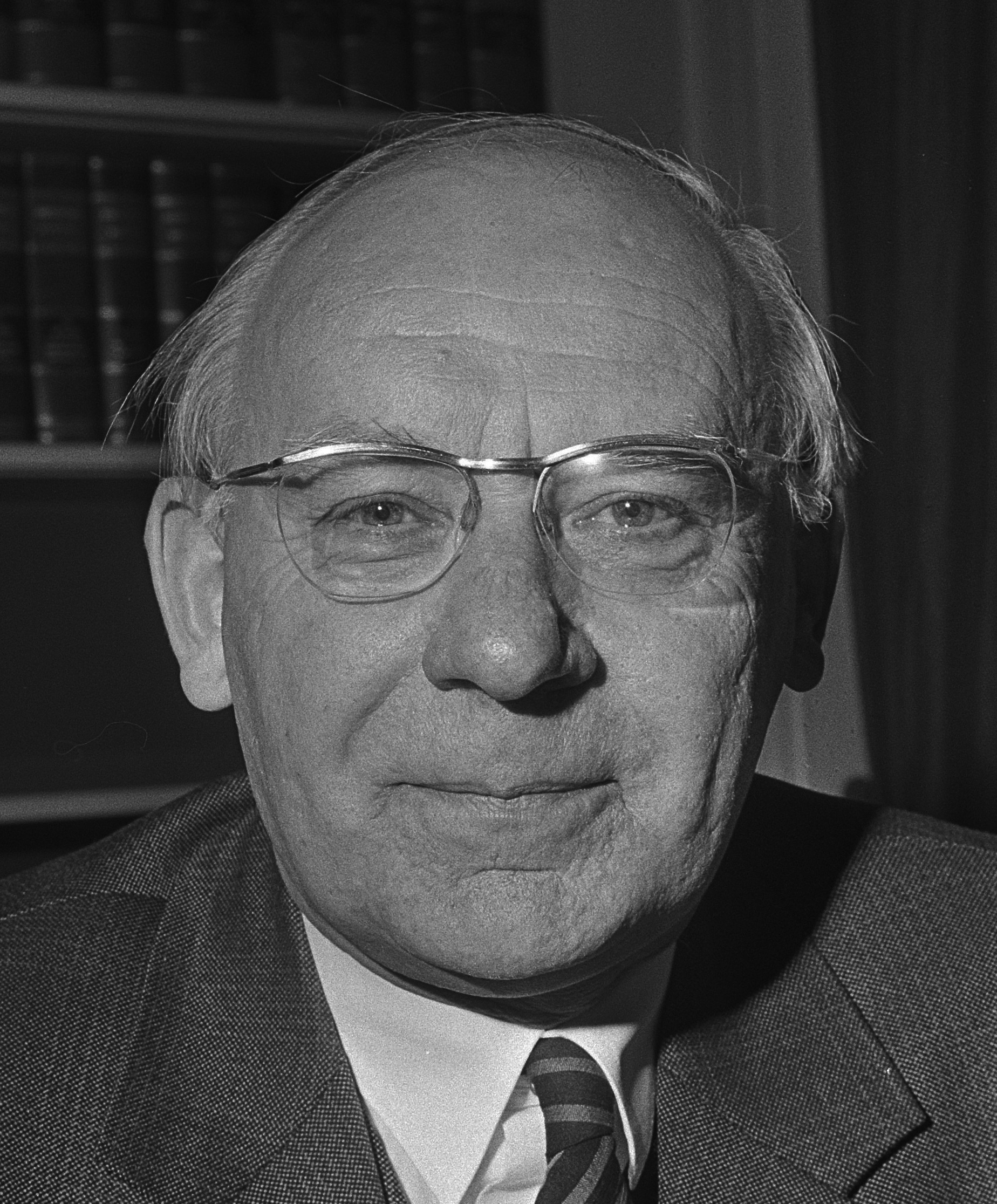
- Vondeling in 1971

Member of the European Parliament
- In office 17 July 1979 – 22 November 1979
- Parliamentary group: Socialist Group
- Constituency: Netherlands

Speaker of the House of Representatives
- In office 7 December 1972 – 17 July 1979
- Preceded by: Frans-Jozef van Thiel
- Succeeded by: Dick Dolman

Chairman of the Labour Party
- In office 7 March 1969 – 1 May 1971
- Leader: Joop den Uyl
- Preceded by: Sjeng Tans
- Succeeded by: André van der Louw

Deputy Prime Minister
- In office 14 April 1965 – 22 November 1966 Serving with Barend Biesheuvel
- Prime Minister: Jo Cals
- Preceded by: Barend Biesheuvel
- Succeeded by: Jan de Quay; Barend Biesheuvel

Minister of Finance
- In office 14 April 1965 – 22 November 1966
- Prime Minister: Jo Cals
- Preceded by: Johan Witteveen
- Succeeded by: Jelle Zijlstra

Leader of the Labour Party
- In office 16 September 1962 – 13 September 1966
- Preceded by: Jaap Burger
- Succeeded by: Joop den Uyl

Parliamentary leader in the House of Representatives
- In office 16 September 1962 – 14 April 1965
- Preceded by: Jaap Burger
- Succeeded by: Gerard Nederhorst
- Parliamentary group: Labour Party

Minister of Agriculture, Fisheries and Food Supplies
- In office 13 January 1958 – 22 December 1958
- Prime Minister: Willem Drees
- Preceded by: Kees Staf (ad interim)
- Succeeded by: Kees Staf

Member of the House of Representatives
- In office 23 February 1967 – 17 July 1979
- In office 20 March 1959 – 14 April 1965
- In office 25 July 1946 – 13 January 1958

Personal details
- Born: 2 March 1916 Appelscha, Netherlands
- Died: 22 November 1979 (aged 63) Mechelen, Belgium
- Party: Labour Party (from 1946)
- Other political affiliations: Dutch People's Movement (1945–1946)
- Spouse: Antonia van 't Hof (m. 1941; div. 1978)
- Children: 2 sons and 1 daughter
- Education: Wageningen Agricultural College (B.S.A., MSE, D.Eng)
- Occupation: Politician · Civil servant · Agronomist · Agricultural engineer · Accountant · Researcher · Professor

Anne Vondeling (2 March 1916 – 22 November 1979) was a Dutch politician of the Labour Party (PvdA) and agronomist.

== Biography ==
Vondeling studied Agronomy at the Wageningen Agricultural College obtaining a Master of Science in Engineering degree and worked as a researcher at his alma mater before finishing his thesis and graduated as a Doctor of Engineering in agricultural engineering. Vondeling worked as an agronomist and agricultural engineer in Friesland from November 1940 until July 1945 and as a director of an agricultural firm in Leeuwarden from July 1945 until January 1958. Vondeling became a member of the House of Representatives shortly after the election of 1946 on 25 July 1946 and served as spokesperson for agriculture. Vondeling was appointed as Minister of Agriculture, Fisheries and Food Supplies in the Drees III cabinet following a cabinet reshuffle taking office on 13 January 1958. The Drees III cabinet fell just 11 months later and was replaced on 22 December 1958. Shortly thereafter Labour Leader Willem Drees announced his retirement and Vondeling served as one of the lead candidates (top candidates) for the 1959 general election. After the election, Vondeling returned to the House of Representatives on 20 March 1959 and served as spokesperson for finance. Vondeling also worked as a professor of agricultural science and international relations at the University of Groningen from January 1960 until January 1963. After the Labour Leader and Parliamentary leader Jaap Burger announced he was stepping down Vondeling was unanimously selected as his successor on 16 September 1962.

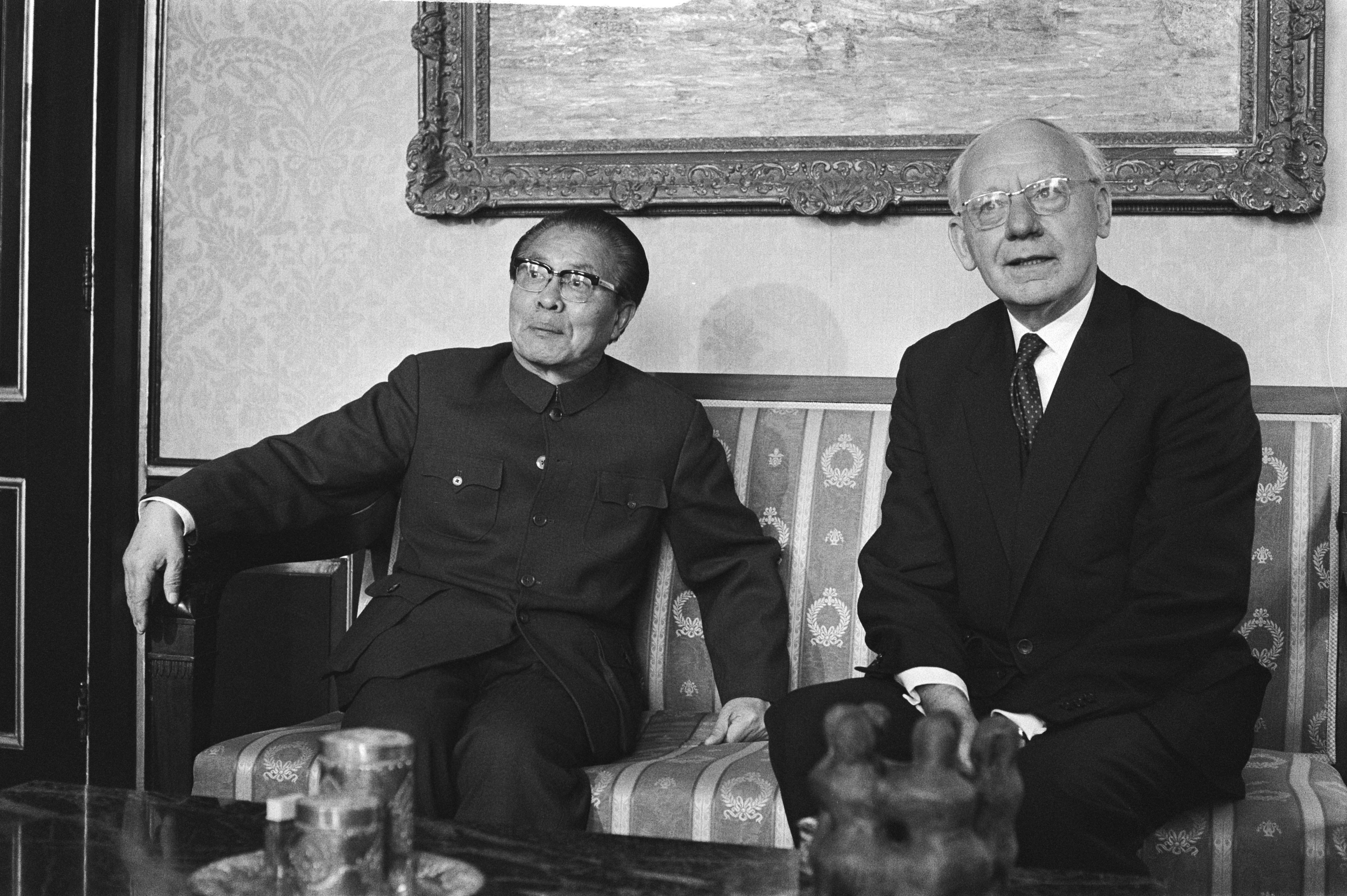
Chinese foreign minister Huang Hua and Speaker of the House Anne Vondeling in The Hague on 8 June 1978

For the 1963 general election Vondeling served again as one of the lead candidates. After the fall of the Marijnen cabinet a successful cabinet formation formed the Cals cabinet with Vondeling appointed as Deputy Prime Minister and Minister of Finance taking office on 14 April 1965. In September 1966 Vondeling unexpectedly announced that he was stepping down as leader but continued to serve in the cabinet. The Cals cabinet fell just one year into its term after the Night of Schmelzer and was replaced on 22 November 1966. After the 1967 general election, Vondeling returned to the House of Representatives on 23 February 1967 and served again as spokesperson for finance. Vondeling also served as party chairman from 7 March 1969 until 1 May 1971. After the 1972 general election, Vondeling was elected as Speaker of the House of Representatives on 7 December 1972. After the 1977 general election Vondeling was re-elected as Speaker. In May 1979 Vondeling announced that he would stand for the 1979 European Parliament election and would resign from the House of Representatives. In the European Parliament election Vondeling was elected as a Member of the European Parliament and became delegation leader on 17 July 1979. On 22 November 1979 Vondeling died after suffering a fatal car crash in Mechelen, Belgium at 63. The Anne Vondeling prize is given annually to journalists who write in a clear manner concerning political subjects.

== Decorations ==
Honours
Ribbon bar	Honour	Country	Date	Comment
	Grand Officer of the Order of Orange-Nassau	Netherlands	17 August 1974	Elevated from Commander (5 December 1966)
	Grand Cross of the Order of Leopold II	Belgium	10 December 1975	
	Grand Officer of the Legion of Honour	France	15 May 1976	
	Commander of the Order of Merit	Germany	18 September 1976	
	Grand Officer of the Order of the Oak Crown	Luxembourg	30 January 1978	
	Commander of the Order of the Netherlands Lion	Netherlands	28 June 1979	Elevated from Knight (2 December 1958)

Party political offices
Preceded by Jaap Burger	Leader of the Labour Party; 1962–1966	Succeeded by Joop den Uyl
Preceded by Jaap Burger	Parliamentary leader of the Labour Party in the House of Representatives; 1962–1965	Succeeded by Gerard Nederhorst
Preceded by Willem Drees; 1956	Lead candidate of the Labour Party; 1959, 1963; With: Jaap Burger (1959); Ko Suurhoff (1959, 1963)	Succeeded by Joop den Uyl; 1967
Preceded by Sjeng Tans	Chairman of the Labour Party; 1969–1971	Succeeded by André van der Louw
Political offices
Preceded by Kees Staf; Ad interim	Minister of Agriculture, Fisheries and Food Supplies; 1958	Succeeded by Kees Staf
Preceded by Barend Biesheuvel	Deputy Prime Minister; 1965–1966; Served alongside: Barend Biesheuvel	Succeeded by Jan de Quay; Barend Biesheuvel
Preceded by Johan Witteveen	Minister of Finance; 1965–1966	Succeeded by Jelle Zijlstra
Preceded by Frans-Jozef van Thiel	Speaker of the House of Representatives; 1972–1979	Succeeded by Dick Dolman
