= Third Drees cabinet =

Dutch cabinet, 1956 to 1958

Third Drees cabinet Fourth Drees cabinet
- Cabinet of the Netherlands

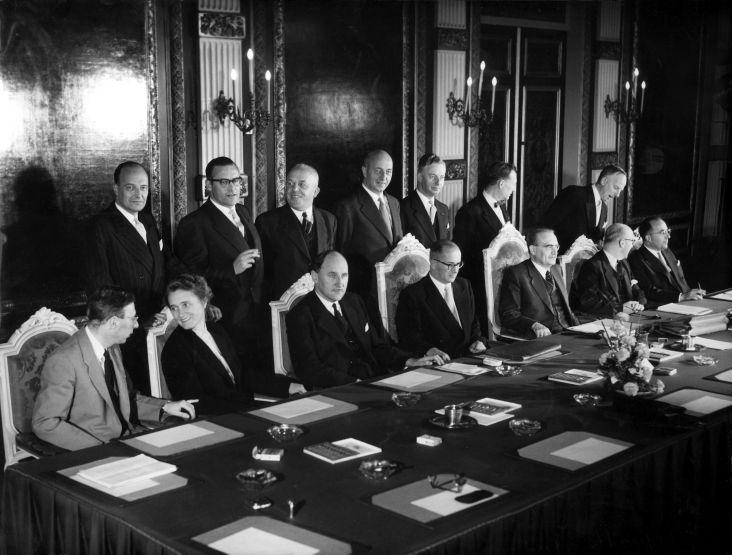
- The first meeting of the incoming Third Drees cabinet on 12 October 1956
- Date formed: 13 October 1956
- Date dissolved: 22 December 1958; 2 years, 70 days in office (Demissionary from 11 December 1958)

People and organisations
- Monarch: Queen Juliana
- Prime Minister: Willem Drees
- Deputy Prime Minister: Teun Struycken
- No. of ministers: 14
- Ministers removed: 2
- Total no. of members: 16
- Member party: Labour Party (PvdA); Catholic People's Party (KVP); Anti-Revolutionary Party (ARP); Christian Historical Union (CHU)
- Status in legislature: Centre-left; Majority government (Grand coalition/Roman-Red)

History
- Election: 1956 election
- Outgoing election: 1959 election
- Legislature terms: 1956–1959
- Incoming formation: 1956 formation
- Outgoing formation: 1958 formation
- Predecessor: Second Drees cabinet
- Successor: Second Beel cabinet

The Third Drees cabinet, also called the Fourth Drees cabinet, was the executive branch of the Dutch Government from 13 October 1956 until 22 December 1958. The cabinet was a continuation of the previous Second Drees cabinet and was formed by the social-democratic Labour Party (PvdA) and the christian-democratic Catholic People's Party (KVP), Anti-Revolutionary Party (ARP) and the Christian Historical Union (CHU) after the election of 1956. The cabinet was a Centre-left grand coalition and had a substantial majority in the House of Representatives, with Labour Leader Willem Drees serving as Prime Minister. Prominent KVP politician Teun Struycken (a former Governor of the Netherlands Antilles) served as Deputy Prime Minister and Minister of the Interior, Property and Public Organisations.

The cabinet served during the middle years of the turbulent 1950s. Domestically, the recovery and rebuilding following World War II continued with the assistance of the Marshall Plan, it also able to finalize several major social reforms to social security, welfare, child benefits and education from the previous cabinet. Internationally the decolonization of the Dutch East Indies continued. After suffering several major internal and external conflicts, including multiple cabinet resignations, the cabinet fell two years into its term, on 11 December 1958, following a disagreement in the coalition over a proposed tax increase; the cabinet continued in a demissionary capacity until it was replaced with the caretaker Second Beel cabinet on 22 December 1958.

== Formation ==
The cabinet formation took four months. This was the longest and most difficult formation the Netherlands had ever seen, partly as a result of the rising tensions between the Labour Party and the Catholic People's Party. After the formation these tensions kept rising, leading to the fall of the cabinet in December 1958. The root of the tensions was the decision of the Roman Catholic Church to excommunicate Catholic socialists from the church. Nearly 100% of the south of the Netherlands used to vote for the Catholic People's Party for decades, but in the 1950s secular political parties got an increase in votes. The excommunication had the result of social exclusion in cities and villages which used to be solidly Catholic blocks. Protestants in the north supported the Catholics.

== Term ==
After considerable growth after World War II, the rising wages, combined with lowered taxes, now led to overspending, which endangered the export. In reaction, wages and government spending were both lowered.

Rising tension with Indonesia, mostly about New Guinea, came to a climax when Indonesia nationalised Dutch properties in the country. The Dutch were supposed to leave entirely.

Other international problems were the Suez Crisis and the Hungarian revolt, which led to monetary and economic problems. The threat of an oil crisis as a result of the Suez crisis led to the installation of car-free Sundays. The suppression of the Hungarian revolution by the USSR led to plundering of communist institutions. Several thousands of Hungarian refugees were accepted into the Netherlands and welcomed in Dutch homes.

On 1 January 1957, the state pension AOW after the age of 65, that was proposed during the former cabinet Drees II, was installed. This resulted from a previous emergency law by Drees, and is the one thing he is remembered for most.

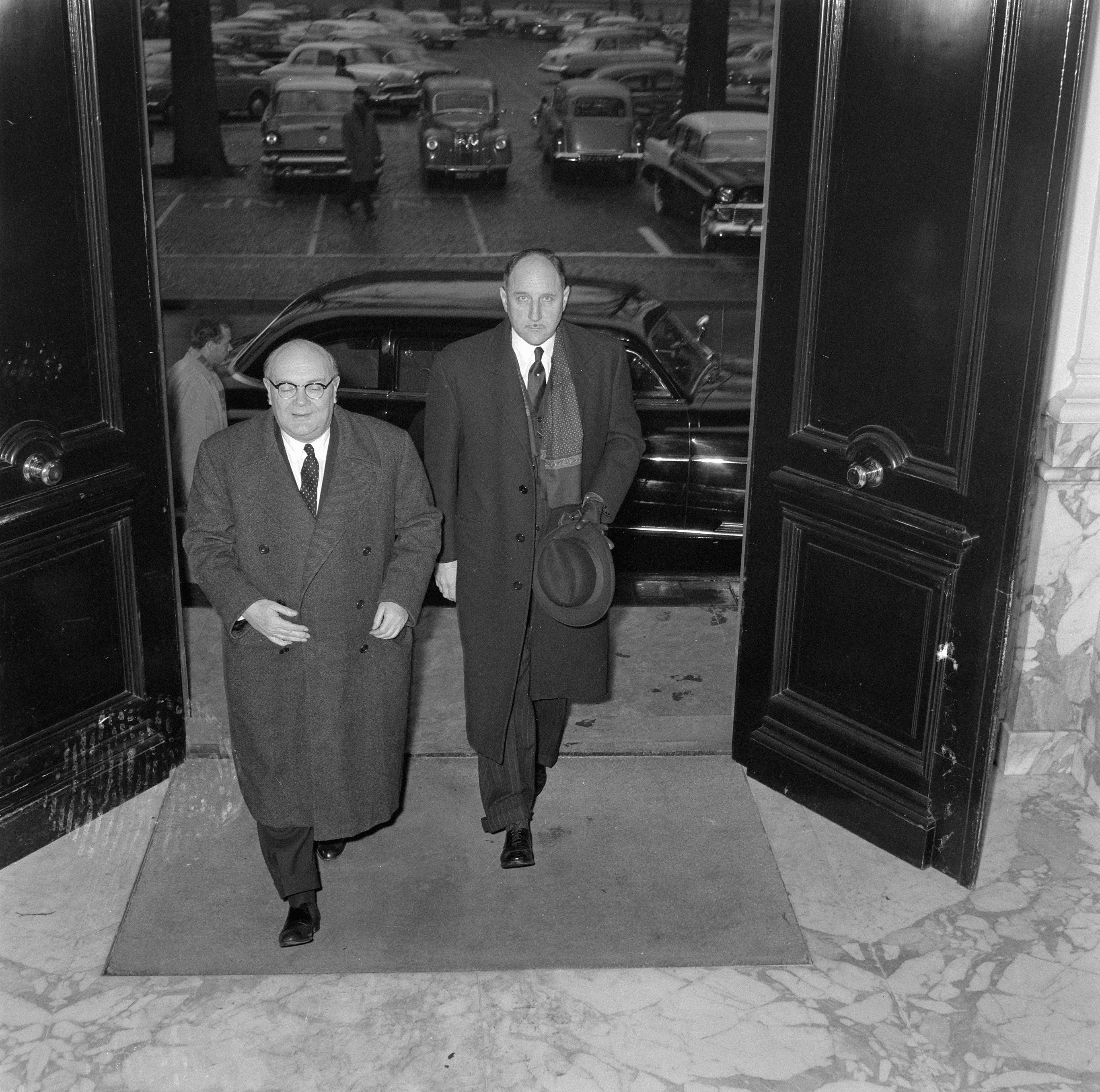
Secretary General of NATO Paul-Henri Spaak and Minister of Foreign Affairs Joseph Luns at the Binnenhof on 2 February 1957

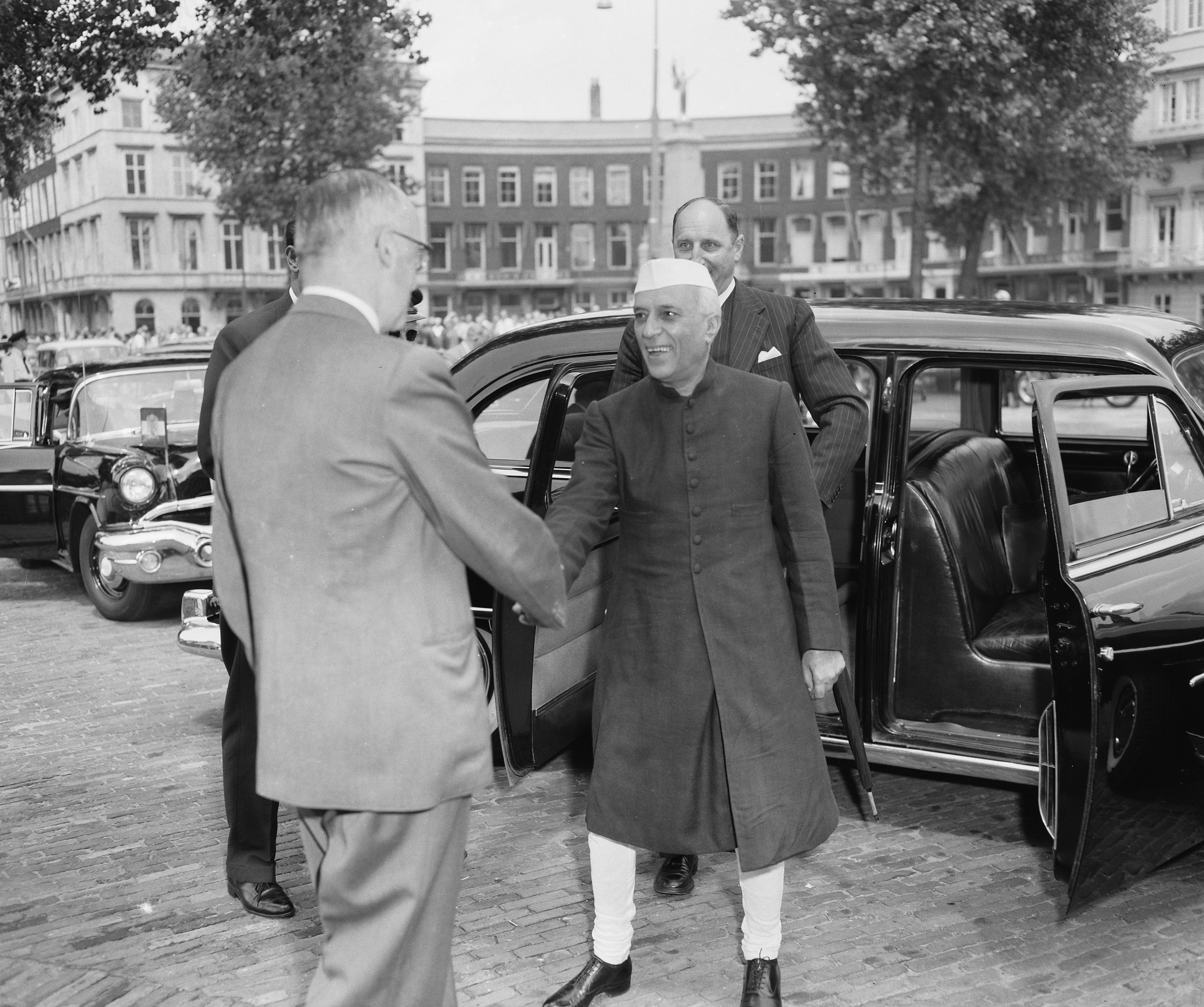
Prime Minister of India Jawaharlal Nehru and Minister of Foreign Affairs Joseph Luns in Rotterdam on 7 July 1957

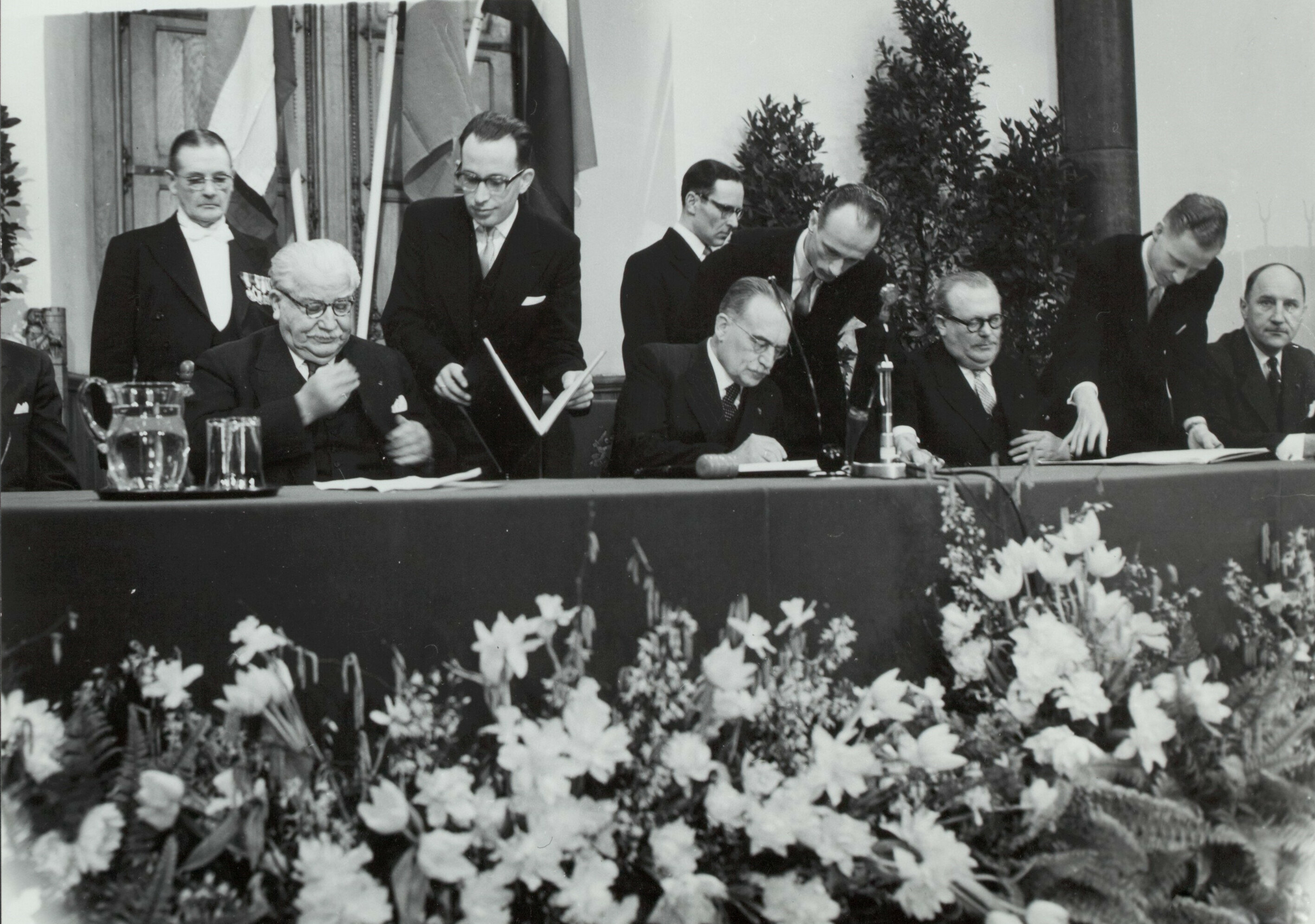
Prime Minister of Luxembourg Joseph Bech, Prime Minister Willem Drees and Prime Minister of Belgium Achille Van Acker at a Benelux conference in the Ridderzaal on 3 February 1958

== Cabinet members ==
Ministers		Title/Ministry/Portfolio(s)			Term of office	Party
Willem Drees	Willem Drees (1886–1988)	Prime Minister	General Affairs		7 August 1948 – 22 December 1958^{[Retained]}	Labour Party
Ko Suurhoff	Ko Suurhoff (1905–1967)	Minister	Interior		13 October 1956 – 29 October 1956^{[Ad Interim]}	Labour Party
Teun Struycken	Teun Struycken (1906–1977)	Minister	Interior, Property and Public; Organisations		29 October 1956 – 19 May 1959^{[Continued]}	Catholic; People's Party
Teun Struycken	Teun Struycken (1906–1977)	Deputy; Prime Minister	Interior, Property and Public; Organisations		29 October 1956 – 19 May 1959^{[Continued]}	Catholic; People's Party
Joseph Luns	Joseph Luns (1911–2002)	Minister	Foreign Affairs		13 October 1956 – 6 July 1971^{[Continued]}	Catholic; People's Party
Henk Hofstra	Henk Hofstra (1904–1999)	Minister	Finance		13 October 1956 – 22 December 1958	Labour Party
Ivo Samkalden	Dr. Ivo Samkalden (1912–1995)	Minister	Justice		13 October 1956 – 22 December 1958	Labour Party
Jelle Zijlstra	Dr. Jelle Zijlstra (1918–2001)	Minister	Economic Affairs		2 September 1952 – 19 May 1959^{[Retained]} ^{[Continued]}	Anti- Revolutionary Party
Kees Staf	Kees Staf (1905–1973)	Minister	War and Navy		15 March 1951 – 19 May 1959^{[Retained]} ^{[Continued]}	Christian; Historical Union
Ko Suurhoff	Ko Suurhoff (1905–1967)	Minister	Social Affairs and Health		2 September 1952 – 22 December 1958^{[Retained]}	Labour Party
Jo Cals	Jo Cals (1914–1971)	Minister	Education, Arts and Sciences		2 September 1952 – 24 July 1963^{[Retained]} ^{[Continued]}	Catholic; People's Party
Jacob Algera	Jacob Algera (1902–1966)	Minister	Transport and Water Management		2 September 1952 – 10 October 1958^{[Retained]} ^{[App]}	Anti-Revolutionary; Party
Herman Witte	Herman Witte (1909–1973)	Minister	Transport and Water Management		10 October 1958 – 1 November 1958^{[Ad Interim]}	Catholic; People's Party
Jan van Aartsen	Jan van Aartsen (1909–1992)	Minister	Transport and Water Management		1 November 1958 – 19 May 1959^{[Continued]}	Anti-Revolutionary; Party
Sicco Mansholt	Sicco Mansholt (1908–1995)	Minister	Agriculture, Fisheries and Food Supplies		25 June 1945 – 1 January 1958^{[Retained]} ^{[App]}	Labour Party
Kees Staf	Kees Staf (1905–1973)	Minister	Agriculture, Fisheries and Food Supplies		1 January 1958 – 13 January 1958^{[Ad Interim]}	Christian; Historical Union
Anne Vondeling	Dr. Anne Vondeling (1916–1979)	Minister	Agriculture, Fisheries and Food Supplies		13 January 1958 – 22 December 1958	Labour Party
Herman Witte	Herman Witte (1909–1973)	Minister	Housing and Construction		2 September 1952 – 19 May 1959^{[Retained]} ^{[Continued]}	Catholic; People's Party
Marga Klompé	Dr. Marga Klompé (1912–1986)	Minister	Social Work		13 October 1956 – 24 July 1963^{[Continued]}	Catholic; People's Party
Kees Staf	Kees Staf (1905–1973)	Minister	Colonial Affairs		18 July 1956 – 16 February 1957^{[Retained]} ^{[Acting]}	Christian; Historical Union
Gerard Helders	Gerard Helders (1905–2013)	Minister	Colonial Affairs		16 February 1957 – 19 May 1959^{[Continued]}	Christian; Historical Union
State Secretaries		Title/Ministry/Portfolio(s)			Term of office	Party
Norbert Schmelzer	Norbert Schmelzer (1921–2008)	State Secretary	Interior, Property and Public; Organisations	• Public; Organisations	29 October 1956 – 19 May 1959^{[Continued]}	Catholic; People's Party
Ernst van der Beugel	Ernst van der Beugel (1918–2004)	State Secretary	Foreign Affairs	• European; Economic; Community • European Union • Benelux	8 January 1957 – 22 December 1958	Labour Party
Gerard Veldkamp	Dr. Gerard Veldkamp (1921–1990)	State Secretary	Economic Affairs	• Small and Medium-sized; Businesses • Consumer; Protection • Tourism	10 October 1952 – 17 July 1961^{[Retained]} ^{[Continued]}	Catholic; People's Party
Ferdinand Kranenburg	Ferdinand; Kranenburg (1911–1994)	State Secretary	War and Navy	• Army • Air Force	1 June 1951 – 1 June 1958^{[Retained]} ^{[Res]}	Labour Party
Meine van Veen	Meine van Veen (1893–1970)	State Secretary	War and Navy	• Army • Air Force	25 October 1958 – 22 December 1958	Labour Party
Harry Moorman	Vice admiral Harry Moorman (1899–1971)	State Secretary	War and Navy	• Navy	1 May 1949 – 19 May 1959^{[Retained]} ^{[Continued]}	Catholic; People's Party
Aat van Rhijn	Dr. Aat van Rhijn (1892–1986)	State Secretary	Social Affairs and Health	• Social Security • Unemployment • Occupational; Safety • Social Services	15 February 1950 – 22 December 1958^{[Retained]}	Labour Party
Anna de Waal	Dr. Anna de Waal (1906–1981)	State Secretary	Education, Arts and Sciences	• Primary; Education • Secondary; Education • Special; Education • Youth Care	2 February 1953 – 16 March 1957^{[Retained]} ^{[Res]}}	Catholic; People's Party
René Höppener	René Höppener (1903–1983)	State Secretary	Education, Arts and Sciences	• Youth Care • Nature • Media • Culture • Art • Recreation • Sport	12 November 1956 – 19 May 1959^{[Continued]}	Catholic; People's Party

^{Resigned}
^{Retained from the previous cabinet}
^{Continued in the next cabinet}
^{Acting}
^{Ad Interim}
^{Appointed as Member of the Council of State}
^{Appointed as European Commissioner}

== Trivia ==
- Eight cabinet members had previous experience as scholars and professors: Henk Hofstra (Fiscal Law), Ivo Samkalden (Agricultural Law), Jelle Zijlstra (Public Economics), Anne Vondeling (Agronomy and Agricultural Engineering), Marga Klompé (Chemistry), Gerard Veldkamp (Microeconomics), Aat van Rhijn (Fiscal Law) and Anna de Waal (Geography).
- Five cabinet members would later be granted the honorary title of Minister of State: Willem Drees (1958), Ivo Samkalden (1985), Jelle Zijlstra (1983), Jo Cals (1966) and Marga Klompé (1971).
- Four cabinet members (later) served as Party Leaders and Lijsttrekkers: Willem Drees (1946–1946) of the Social Democratic Workers' Party and (1946–1958) of the Labour Party, Anne Vondeling (1962–1966) of the Labour Party, Jelle Zijlstra (1956, 1958–1959) of the Anti-Revolutionary Party and Norbert Schmelzer (1963–1971) of the Catholic People's Party.
- Two cabinet members lived to centenarian age: Willem Drees (1886–1988) lived to 101 years, 314 days and Gerard Helders (1905–2013) lived to 107 years, 303 days.
