= Jelle Zijlstra =

Prime Minister of the Netherlands from 1966 to 1967

His Excellency Jelle Zijlstra
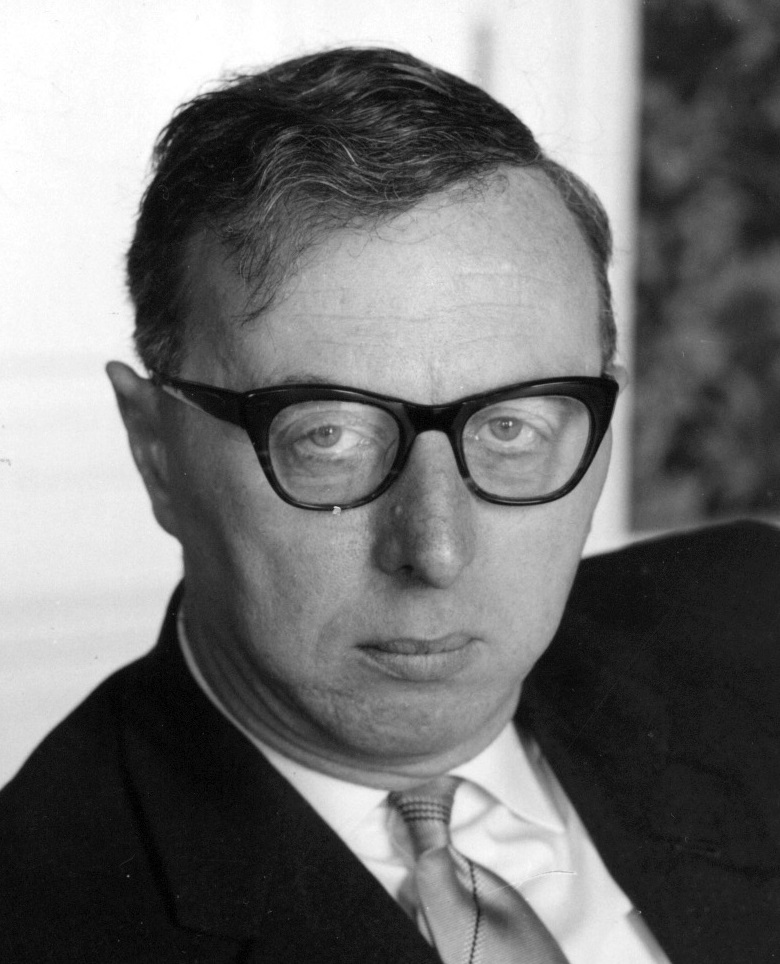
- Zijlstra in 1966

Prime Minister of the Netherlands
- In office 22 November 1966 – 5 April 1967
- Monarch: Juliana
- Deputy: Jan de Quay; Barend Biesheuvel
- Preceded by: Jo Cals
- Succeeded by: Piet de Jong

President of De Nederlandsche Bank
- In office 1 May 1967 – 1 January 1982
- Preceded by: Marius Holtrop
- Succeeded by: Wim Duisenberg

Member of the Social and Economic Council
- In office 10 May 1967 – 18 December 1981
- Chairman: Jan de Pous

Member of the Senate
- In office 25 June 1963 – 22 November 1966

Minister of Finance
- In office 22 November 1966 – 5 April 1967
- Prime Minister: Himself
- Preceded by: Anne Vondeling
- Succeeded by: Johan Witteveen
- In office 22 December 1958 – 24 July 1963
- Prime Minister: Louis Beel (1958–1959); Jan de Quay (1959–1963)
- Preceded by: Henk Hofstra
- Succeeded by: Johan Witteveen

Member of the House of Representatives
- In office 20 March 1959 – 26 May 1959
- In office 3 July 1956 – 13 October 1956

Parliamentary leader in the House of Representatives
- In office 3 July 1956 – 3 October 1956
- Preceded by: Jan Schouten
- Succeeded by: Sieuwert Bruins Slot
- Parliamentary group: Anti-Revolutionary Party

Leader of the Anti-Revolutionary Party
- In office 29 December 1958 – 26 May 1959
- Deputy: Sieuwert Bruins Slot
- Preceded by: Sieuwert Bruins Slot
- Succeeded by: Sieuwert Bruins Slot
- In office 23 April 1956 – 3 October 1956
- Deputy: Sieuwert Bruins Slot
- Preceded by: Jan Schouten
- Succeeded by: Sieuwert Bruins Slot

Minister of Economic Affairs
- In office 2 September 1952 – 19 May 1959
- Prime Minister: Willem Drees (1952–1958); Louis Beel (1958–1959)
- Preceded by: Jan van den Brink
- Succeeded by: Jan de Pous

Personal details
- Born: Jelle Zijlstra; 27 August 1918 Oosterbierum, Netherlands
- Died: 23 December 2001 (aged 83) Wassenaar, Netherlands
- Party: Christian Democratic Appeal (from 1980)
- Other political affiliations: Anti-Revolutionary Party (until 1980)
- Relatives: Rinse Zijlstra (brother)
- Education: Rotterdam School of Economics (BEc, M.Econ, PhD)
- Occupation: Politician · civil servant · Economist · Businessperson · Banker · Corporate director · Nonprofit director · Author · professor

Military service
- Allegiance: Netherlands
- Branch/service: Royal Netherlands Army
- Years of service: 1939–1940 (Conscription); 1940 (Active duty)
- Rank: Lieutenant
- Battles/wars: World War II; Battle of the Netherlands; Battle of France

Jelle Zijlstra (also spelled Zylstra; Dutch pronunciation: [ˈjɛlə ˈzɛilstraː]; 27 August 1918 – 23 December 2001) was a Dutch politician and economist who served as Prime Minister of the Netherlands from 22 November 1966 until 5 April 1967. He was a member of the Anti-Revolutionary Party (ARP).

Zijlstra studied economics at the Rotterdam School of Economics, obtaining a Master of Economics degree, before working as a researcher and lecturer at his alma mater and finished his thesis and graduating a Doctor of Philosophy in Public economics. He worked as a professor of Public economics at the Vrije Universiteit Amsterdam from October 1948 until September 1952. After the 1952 general election Zijlstra was appointed as Minister of Economic Affairs in the Drees II cabinet, taking office on 2 September 1952. After Party Leader Jan Schouten announced his retirement, Zijlstra was selected as his successor on 23 April 1956. For the 1956 general election, Zijlstra served as lead candidate and was elected to the House of Representatives, becoming parliamentary leader on 3 July 1956. Following a cabinet formation, Zijlstra continued as Minister of Economic Affairs in the Drees III cabinet and stepped down as party leader and parliamentary leader on 3 October 1956. The Drees III cabinet fell on 11 December 1958 and was replaced by the caretaker Beel II cabinet, with Zijlstra retaining his position and also becoming Minister of Finance taking office on 22 December 1958. For the 1959 general election, Zijlstra again served as lead candidate. Following a cabinet formation, Zijlstra continued as minister of finance in the De Quay cabinet. In September 1962 Zijlstra announced that he would not stand for the 1963 general election, and declined to serve in the new cabinet. Zijlstra returned as a distinguished professor of public economics at the Vrije Universiteit and was elected to the Senate after the 1963 Senate election, taking office on 25 June 1963 and serving as a frontbencher and spokesperson for finance. Zijlstra also served as director of the Abraham Kuyper Foundation from August 1963 until November 1966.

Zijlstra continued to be active in politics and in September 1966 was nominated as the next president of De Nederlandsche Bank, the country's central bank. However, after the Night of Schmelzer, he was persuaded to lead an interim cabinet until the next election. Zijlstra formed the caretaker Zijlstra cabinet and took office as Prime Minister of the Netherlands and minister of finance on 22 November 1966. Before the 1967 general election, Zijlstra indicated that he would not serve another term as prime minister and opted to accept the nomination as head of De Nederlandsche Bank. Zijlstra left office following the installation of the De Jong cabinet on 5 April 1967 and was confirmed as chief of De Nederlandsche Bank, serving from 1 May 1967 until 1 January 1982.

Zijlstra retired from active politics at 63 and became active in the private and public sectors as a corporate and non-profit director and served on several state commissions and councils on behalf of the government, and continued to be active in advocating for a balanced governmental budget. Zijlstra was known for his abilities as a skilful manager and effective debater. Zijlstra was granted the honorary title of Minister of State on 30 April 1983 and continued to comment on political affairs as a statesman until his death from dementia-related illness at the age of 83. He holds the distinction as the shortest-serving Prime Minister after World War II and his premiership is therefore usually omitted both by scholars and the public in rankings but his legacy as a minister in the 1950s and 60s and later as president of De Nederlandsche Bank continue to this day.

== Biography ==
=== Early life ===
Jelle Zijlstra was born on 27 August 1918 in Oosterbierum in the province of Friesland in a Reformed family, the son of Ane Jelle Zijlstra (born 14 November 1879) and Pietje Postuma (born 6 March 1897), both of whom had also been born in the village. After completing his secondary education, he studied at the Netherlands School of Economics, the predecessor of the Erasmus University Rotterdam. His studies were interrupted twice: first by his period of military service and later when he had to go into hiding in 1942 after refusing to sign the loyalty oath required of students by the Nazi occupation authorities. Even so, he completed his economics degree in October 1945 as a Master of Economics.

Immediately after graduating, Zijlstra became a research assistant at the Netherlands School of Economics and was promoted a year later to senior research assistant and in 1947 to lecturer. In 1948 he was awarded a doctorate as a Doctor of Philosophy with cum laude for his thesis on the rate of circulation of money and its bearing on the value of money and monetary equilibrium. In the same year he was appointed professor of economics at the Vrije Universiteit Amsterdam.

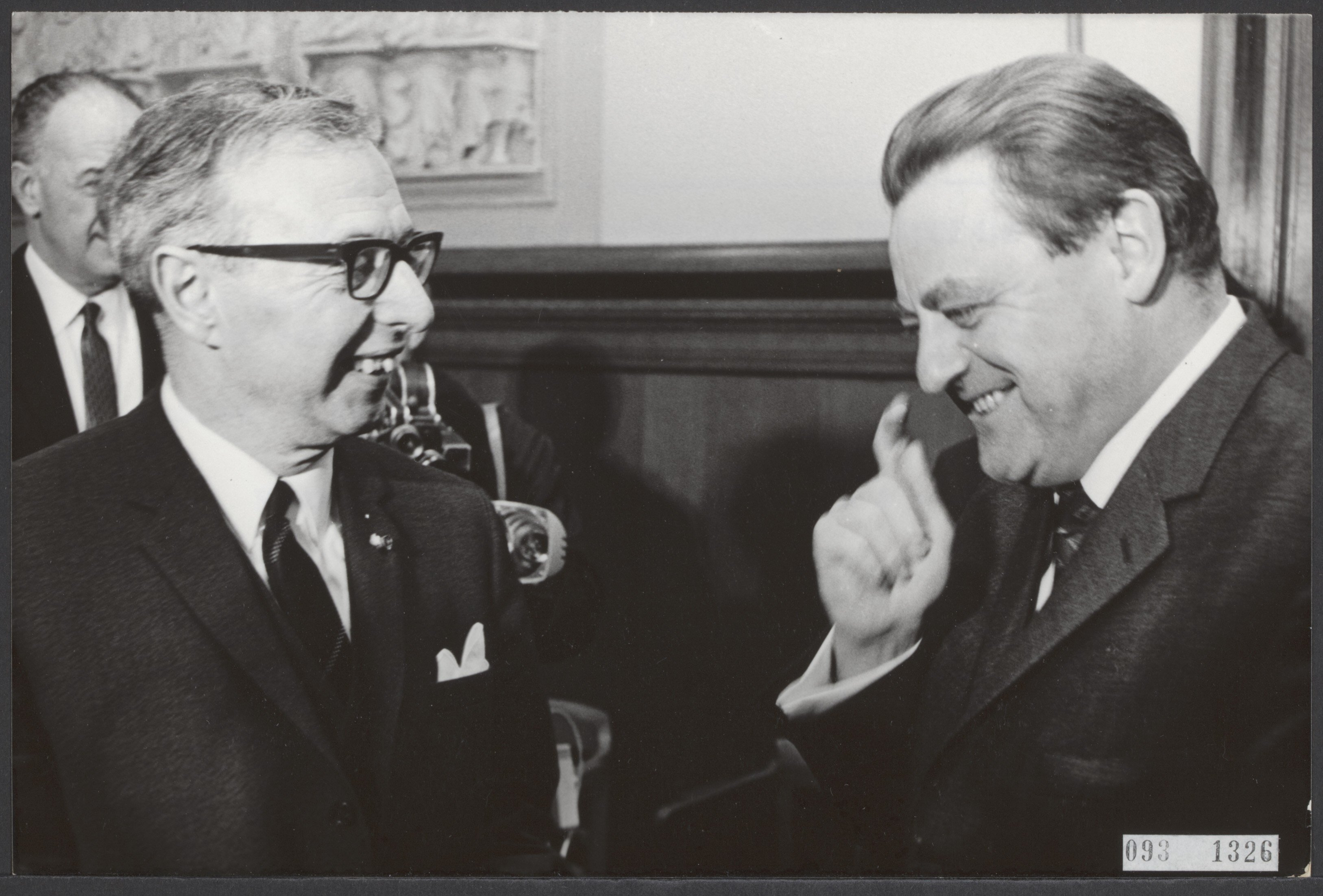
Prime Minister Jelle Zijlstra and Minister of Finance of West Germany Franz Josef Strauss during a meeting at the Peace Palace in The Hague on 16 January 1967.

=== Politics ===
Representing the Anti-Revolutionary Party, Zijlstra successively served as Minister of Economic Affairs in the Drees II, Drees III and Beel II cabinets, and as Minister of Finance in the Beel II and De Quay cabinets between 2 September 1952 and 24 July 1963.

Following his ministerial career, Zijlstra returned to the Vrije Universiteit as professor of public finance, though he also served as a member of the Senate between 1963 and 1966. In 1973 Zijlstra became member of the Royal Netherlands Academy of Arts and Sciences. After the fall of the Cals cabinet, Zijlstra headed an interim government as Prime Minister of the Netherlands and Minister of Finance between 22 November 1966 until 5 April 1967.

From 1967 until the end of 1981 he was President of De Nederlandsche Bank, the central bank of the Netherlands, and in the course of that period he was also President of the Bank for International Settlements in Basel. He has sat on many boards in the public and private sectors.

=== Personal ===
On 11 March 1946, Zijlstra married his childhood sweetheart Hetty Bloksma (30 January 1921 – 19 November 2013). They had three daughters and two sons, who were born between 1947 and 1961. Zijlstra lived in Wassenaar from 1982 until his death in neighbourhood of Oud Wassenaar. The last months of life were dominated by his deteriorating health and he suffered from vascular dementia, Zijlstra died in Wassenaar on 23 December 2001 at the age of eighty-three, and was buried at the cemetery of the local Reformed Church in Wassenaar. His younger brother Rinse Zijlstra (19 April 1927 – 26 September 2017) was also a member of the House of Representatives, serving from 23 February 1967 until 10 May 1971 and a Senator serving from 12 April 1983 until 13 June 1995 for the Anti-Revolutionary Party and the Christian Democratic Appeal.

== Decorations ==
Military decorations
Ribbon bar	Decoration	Country	Date	Comment
	War Memorial Cross	Netherlands	5 May 1946	
	Mobilisation War Cross	Netherlands	31 August 1948	
Honours
Ribbon bar	Honour	Country	Date	Comment
	Grand Decoration of Honour in Gold with Sash of the Decoration of Honour for Services	Austria	1958	
	Grand Cross of the Order of the Crown	Belgium	10 December 1966	
	Knight Grand Cross of the Order of Orange-Nassau	Netherlands	27 April 1967	
	Grand Cross of the Order of the House of Orange	Netherlands	27 August 1978	
	Knight Grand Cross of the Order of the Netherlands Lion	Netherlands	18 November 1981	Elevated from Commander (27 July 1963)
Honorific Titles
Ribbon bar	Honour	Country	Date	Comment
	Minister of State	Netherlands	30 April 1983	Style of Excellency

Party political offices
Preceded by Jan Schouten; 1952	Lead candidate of the Anti-Revolutionary Party; 1956, 1959	Succeeded by Barend Biesheuvel; 1963
Preceded by Jan Schouten	Leader of the Anti-Revolutionary Party; 1956; 1958–1959	Succeeded by Sieuwert Bruins Slot
Preceded by Sieuwert Bruins Slot	Leader of the Anti-Revolutionary Party; 1956; 1958–1959	Succeeded by Sieuwert Bruins Slot
Preceded by Jan Schouten	Parliamentary leader of the Anti-Revolutionary Party in the House of Representatives; 1956	Succeeded by Sieuwert Bruins Slot
Political offices
Preceded by Jan van den Brink	Minister of Economic Affairs; 1952–1959	Succeeded by Jan de Pous
Preceded by Henk Hofstra	Minister of Finance; 1958–1963; 1966–1967	Succeeded by Johan Witteveen
Preceded by Anne Vondeling	Minister of Finance; 1958–1963; 1966–1967	Succeeded by Johan Witteveen
Preceded by Jo Cals	Prime Minister of the Netherlands; Minister of General Affairs; 1966–1967	Succeeded by Piet de Jong
Civic offices
Preceded by Marius Holtrop	President of De Nederlandsche Bank; 1967–1982	Succeeded by Wim Duisenberg
Non-profit organization positions
Preceded by Jan Schouten	Director of the Abraham Kuyper Foundation; 1963–1966	Succeeded by Wim Hoogendijk
