= Gerard Helders =

Dutch politician (1905–2013)

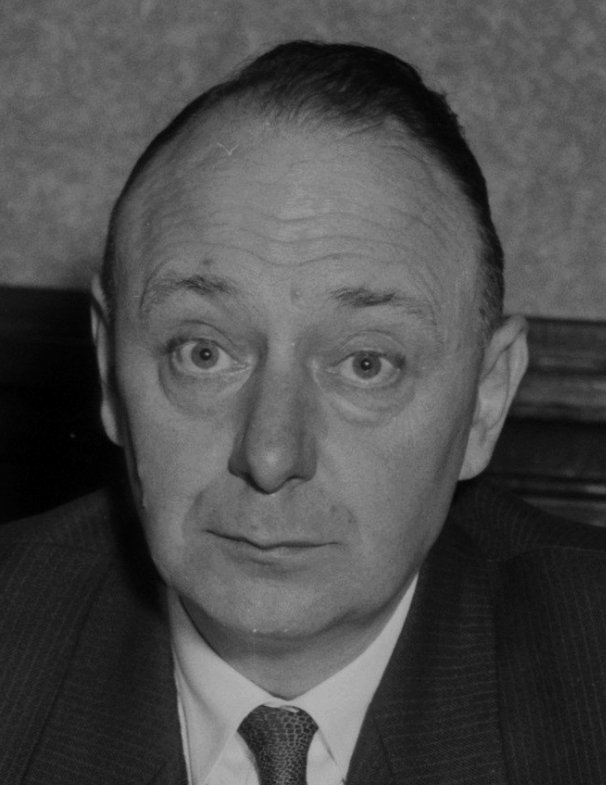
- Gerard Helders in 1957

Member of the Council of State
- In office 1 August 1959 – 1 September 1975
- Vice President: Louis Beel (1959–1972); Marinus Ruppert (1972–1975)

Minister of Colonial Affairs
- In office 16 February 1957 – 19 May 1959
- Prime Minister: Willem Drees (1957–1958); Louis Beel (1958–1959)
- Preceded by: Kees Staf (Ad interim)
- Succeeded by: Henk Korthals as Minister for Overseas Affairs

Personal details
- Born: Gerardus Philippus Helders; 9 March 1905 Rotterdam, Netherlands
- Died: 6 January 2013 (aged 107) Wassenaar, Netherlands
- Party: Christian Democratic Appeal (from 1980)
- Other political affiliations: Christian Historical Union (1932–1980)
- Spouse: Pieternella Meijer (m. 1930; died 1982)
- Children: 4 daughters and 1 son
- Education: Leiden University (Bachelor of Laws, Master of Laws)
- Occupation: Politician · Diplomat · Civil servant · Jurist · Economist · Businessman · Banker · Corporate director · Nonprofit director · Lobbyist

Military service
- Allegiance: Netherlands
- Branch/service: Royal Netherlands Army (1929–1931); Royal Netherlands; East Indies Army (1931–1942)
- Years of service: 1929–1930 (Conscription); 1930–1940 (Reserve); 1940–1942 (Active duty)
- Rank: Major
- Unit: Regiment van Heutsz
- Battles/wars: World War II; Pacific War; Dutch East Indies campaign; Battle of Borneo

Gerardus Philippus Helders (9 March 1905 – 6 January 2013) was a Dutch politician and diplomat of the defunct Christian Historical Union (CHU) party now merged into the Christian Democratic Appeal (CDA) party and jurist.

Helders applied at the Leiden University in June 1925 majoring in Law and obtaining a Bachelor of Laws degree in July 1927 before graduating with a Master of Laws degree in July 1929. Helders worked as a paralegal for a law firm in Rotterdam from July 1929 until February 1931 Helders worked as a civil servant for the Ministry of Colonial Affairs in Batavia in the Dutch East Indies from February 1931 until April 1936 and as a senior tax collector in Bandung from April 1936 until May 1941 and as chief tax collector in Batavia from May 1941 until March 1942. Helders also served in the military reserve force of the Royal Netherlands East Indies Army as a Major and was in service during the Dutch East Indies campaign. On 8 March 1942 Helders was captured following the Battle of Borneo and detained in the Japanese internment camp Kampong Makassar and was detained until September 1945. Following the end of World War II Helders moved back to the Netherlands and worked as a civil servant for the Ministry of Finance from December 1945 until February 1948 as Deputy Director-General of the department for Legal Affairs from June 1946 until April 1947 and as Director-General of the department for Legal Affairs from April 1947 until February 1948. In January 1948 Bakker was nominated as CFO of the Nationale Handelsbank serving from 1 February 1948 until 1 January 1949 when he was nominated as CEO of the Nationale Handelsbank.

After the election of 1956 Helders was appointed as Minister of Colonial Affairs in the Cabinet Drees III, taking office on 16 February 1957. The Cabinet Drees III fell on 11 December 1958 and continued to serve in a demissionary capacity until it was replaced by the caretaker Cabinet Beel II with Helders continuing as Minister of Colonial Affairs, taking office on 22 December 1958. Following the cabinet formation of 1959 Helders was not giving a cabinet post in the new cabinet, the Cabinet Beel II was replaced by the Cabinet De Quay on 19 May 1959. In July 1959 Helders was nominated as Member of the Council of State, serving from 1 August 1959 until 1 September 1975. Helders also became active in the private sector and public sector and occupied numerous seats as a corporate director and nonprofit director on several boards of directors and supervisory boards and served on several state commissions and as a diplomat and lobbyist for several economic delegations on behalf of the government.

== Biography ==
=== Early life ===
Helders was born in Rotterdam. His father worked as a winetrader. From 1925 to 1929 he studied civil law at Leiden University. He married in 1930 and was the father of one son and four daughters.

=== Politics ===
Helders started his career as a politician for the Christian Historical Union in the Dutch colony of the Dutch East Indies where he worked as a member of the city council in the cities Bandung and Batavia (nowadays Jakarta). From 1942 until 1945, during which Indonesia was occupied by Japan, Helders was interned. During the 1950s, Helders was for a short time minister of colonial affairs in two governments. In 1957 and 1958 in a government led by prime minister Willem Drees and a second one which was led by Louis Beel. During this period he was responsible for building up a government in the now Indonesian province of New-Guinea. From 1959 to 1975 he was a member of the Council of State.

=== Longevity ===
At the time of his death at the age of 107, he was the oldest living former Dutch politician. As Minister of Colonial Affairs he worked under Prime Minister Willem Drees who himself reached the high age of 101. Helders lived in Wassenaar. For his 105th, 106th and 107th birthday the mayor of Wassenaar visited him, and on each occasion he wrote in his blog that he was surprised that Helders was still in such good health and well aware of current affairs. Helders became the oldest living man in the Netherlands after the death of 110-year-old Cornelis Geurtz on 21 August 2012. He had twelve grandchildren and several great-grandchildren. Helders died on 6 January 2013.

== Decorations ==
Honours
Ribbon bar	Honour	Country	Date	Comment
	Knight of the Order of the Netherlands Lion	Netherlands	9 June 1959	
	Commander of the Order of Orange-Nassau	Netherlands	29 April 1969	

Political offices
Preceded by Kees Staf; Ad interim	Minister of Colonial Affairs; 1957–1959	Succeeded by Henk Korthals as Minister for Overseas Affairs
Records
Preceded by Henk Hofstra	Oldest living former cabinet member 16 February 1999 – 6 January 2013	Succeeded by Piet de Jong
Preceded by Cornelis Geurtz	Oldest living male in the Netherlands; 21 August 2012 – 6 January 2013	Succeeded by Arie Vermeulen
