= Sidney J. van den Bergh =

Dutch politician and businessman (1898–1977)

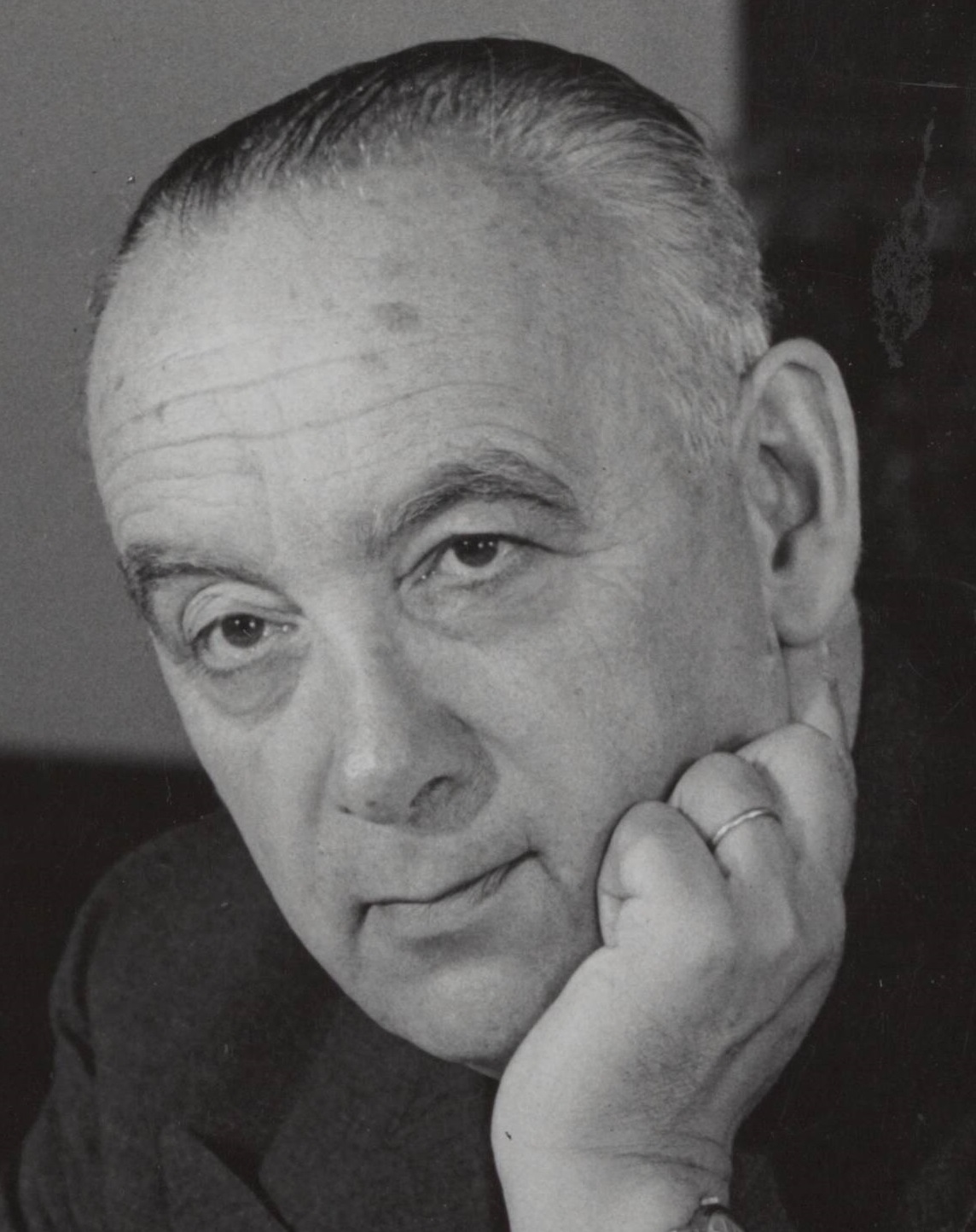
- Van den Bergh in 1959

Member of the Senate
- In office 17 September 1963 – 10 May 1971
- Parliamentary group: People's Party for Freedom and Democracy

Minister of Defence
- In office 19 May 1959 – 1 August 1959
- Prime Minister: Jan de Quay
- Preceded by: Kees Staf
- Succeeded by: Jan de Quay (Ad interim)

Personal details
- Born: Sidney James van den Bergh; 25 October 1898 Rotterdam, Netherlands
- Died: 25 September 1977 (aged 78) Wassenaar, Netherlands
- Party: People's Party for Freedom and Democracy (from 1948)
- Other political affiliations: Committee-Oud (1947–1948); Independent (1946–1947); Free-thinking; Democratic League (1920–1946)
- Spouses: Geertruida Gerhardt (m. 1920; div. 1928) Sibendiena van den Berg (m. 1928; div. 1940) Maria Meijers (m. 1940; died 1957) Helga Bendix (m. 1960; died 1971) Nicolette van Wijk (m. 1972)
- Children: 2 sons (first marriage); 1 son (second marriage); 2 sons and 1 daughter (third marriage); 1 daughter (fourth marriage)
- Education: Erasmus University Rotterdam (Bachelor of Economics)
- Occupation: Politician · Businessman · Corporate director · Nonprofit director · Army Officer

Military service
- Allegiance: Netherlands
- Branch/service: Royal Netherlands Army
- Years of service: 1933–1939 (Reserve); 1939–1946 (Active duty)
- Rank: Major general
- Battles/wars: World War II; Battle of the Netherlands; Battle of France

Sidney James van den Bergh (25 October 1898 – 25 September 1977) was a Dutch politician of the People's Party for Freedom and Democracy (VVD) and businessman.

== Decorations ==
Military decorations
Ribbon bar	Decoration	Country	Date	Comment
	War Memorial Cross	Netherlands	5 May 1946	
	Mobilisation War Cross	Netherlands	1 June 1945	
	Distinction sign for Long-term, Honest and Loyal Service	Netherlands	15 August 1946	Honorable discharge
Honours
Ribbon bar	Honour	Country	Date	Comment
	Knight of the Order of the Netherlands Lion	Netherlands	25 September 1960	
	Commander of the Order of Orange-Nassau	Netherlands	30 April 1968	
Awards
Ribbon bar	Awards	Organization	Date	Comment
	Honorary Member	People's Party for Freedom and Democracy	29 March 1969	

Political offices
Preceded by Kees Staf	Minister of Defence; 1959–1960	Succeeded by Jan de Quay; Ad interim
