= Second Drees cabinet =

Dutch cabinet, 1952 to 1956

Second Drees cabinet Third Drees cabinet
- Cabinet of the Netherlands

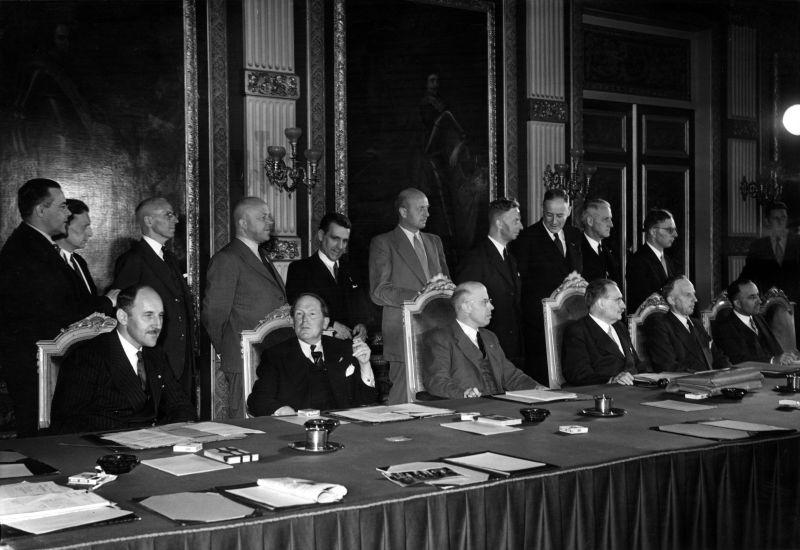
- First meeting of the cabinet in the Trêveszaal on 2 September 1952
- Date formed: 2 September 1952
- Date dissolved: 13 October 1956; 4 years, 41 days in office (Demissionary from 13 June 1956)

People and organisations
- Monarch: Queen Juliana
- Prime Minister: Willem Drees
- Deputy Prime Minister: Louis Beel
- No. of ministers: 17
- Ministers removed: 3
- Total no. of members: 16
- Member party: Labour Party (PvdA); Catholic People's Party (KVP); Anti-Revolutionary Party (ARP); Christian Historical Union (CHU)
- Status in legislature: Centre-left; Majority government (Grand coalition/Roman-Red)

History
- Election: 1952 election
- Outgoing election: 1956 election
- Legislature terms: 1952–1956
- Incoming formation: 1952 formation
- Outgoing formation: 1956 formation
- Predecessor: First Drees cabinet
- Successor: Third Drees cabinet

The Second Drees cabinet, also called the Third Drees cabinet was the executive branch of the Dutch Government from 2 September 1952 until 13 October 1956. The cabinet was formed by the social-democratic Labour Party (PvdA) and the Christian-democratic Catholic People's Party (KVP), Anti-Revolutionary Party (ARP) and Christian Historical Union (CHU) after the election of 1952. The cabinet was a Centre-left grand coalition and had a majority in the House of Representatives with Labour Leader Willem Drees serving as Prime Minister. Former Catholic Prime Minister Louis Beel served as Deputy Prime Minister and Minister of the Interior.

The cabinet served during early years of the turbulent 1950s. Domestically the recovery and rebuilding following World War II continued with the assistance of the Marshall Plan. It was also able to finalize several major social reforms to social security, welfare, child benefits and education from the previous cabinet. Internationally the decolonization of the Dutch East Indies following the Indonesian National Revolution continued. The cabinet suffered no major internal and external conflicts and completed its entire term and was succeeded by the Third Drees cabinet following the election of 1956.

== Term ==
The economic recovery after World War II continued. This made further expansion of social security possible, of which the best example is the institution of the state pension AOW in 1956. Also, a major housing scheme was executed, building 80 000 houses per year.

A major setback was the North Sea flood of 1953, which resulted in damage equivalent to 5% of the GDP. An emergency law was made to recover the dykes and plans were made for the Delta Works, the world's largest flood protection project, which should protect the South West Netherlands against another such combination of storm and spring tide.

An episcopal 'mandement' called for Catholics to give up their PvdA-membership, but without result.

The 29 December 1952 Statute for the kingdom granted Surinam and the Netherlands Antilles a certain degree of independence within the kingdom.

In 1955 the labour ban on married women was abolished, following the "motion Tendeloo", named after PvdA's member of parliament Corry Tendeloo. This ban meant that state employers had to fire their female employees once they married.

On 15 February 1956 the Dutch-Indonesian Union officially ended. Relationships between the two countries continued to deteriorate.

When the PvdA voted with the opposition over a combined law to lower taxes and raise rents on 17 May 1955, this led to a crisis. The cabinet fell, but returned after 17 days when PvdA chairman Burger had reconciled the parties.

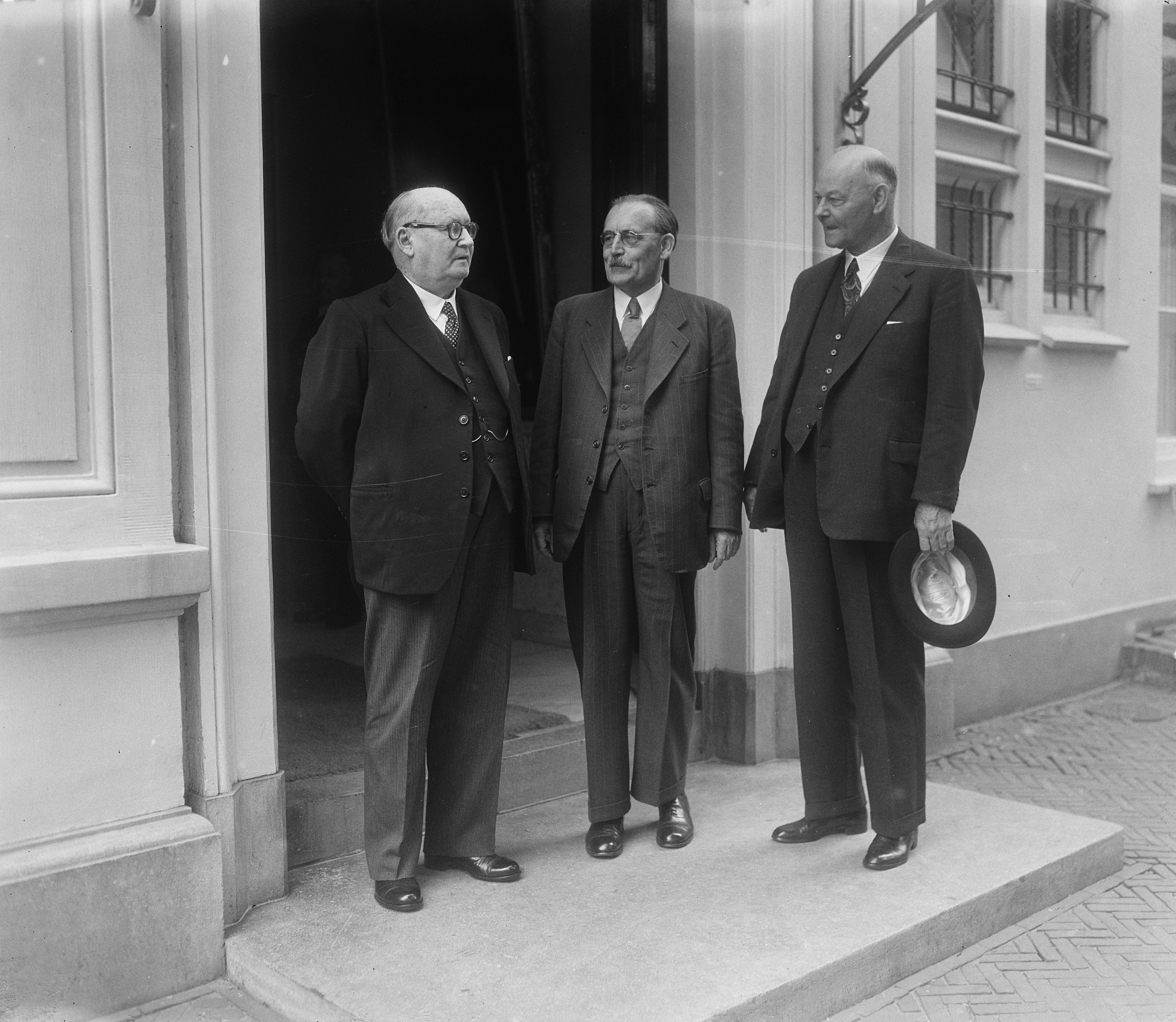
Prime Minister of South Africa D. F. Malan, Prime Minister Willem Drees and Minister of Colonial Affairs Willem Kernkamp at the Ministry of General Affairs on 9 June 1953.

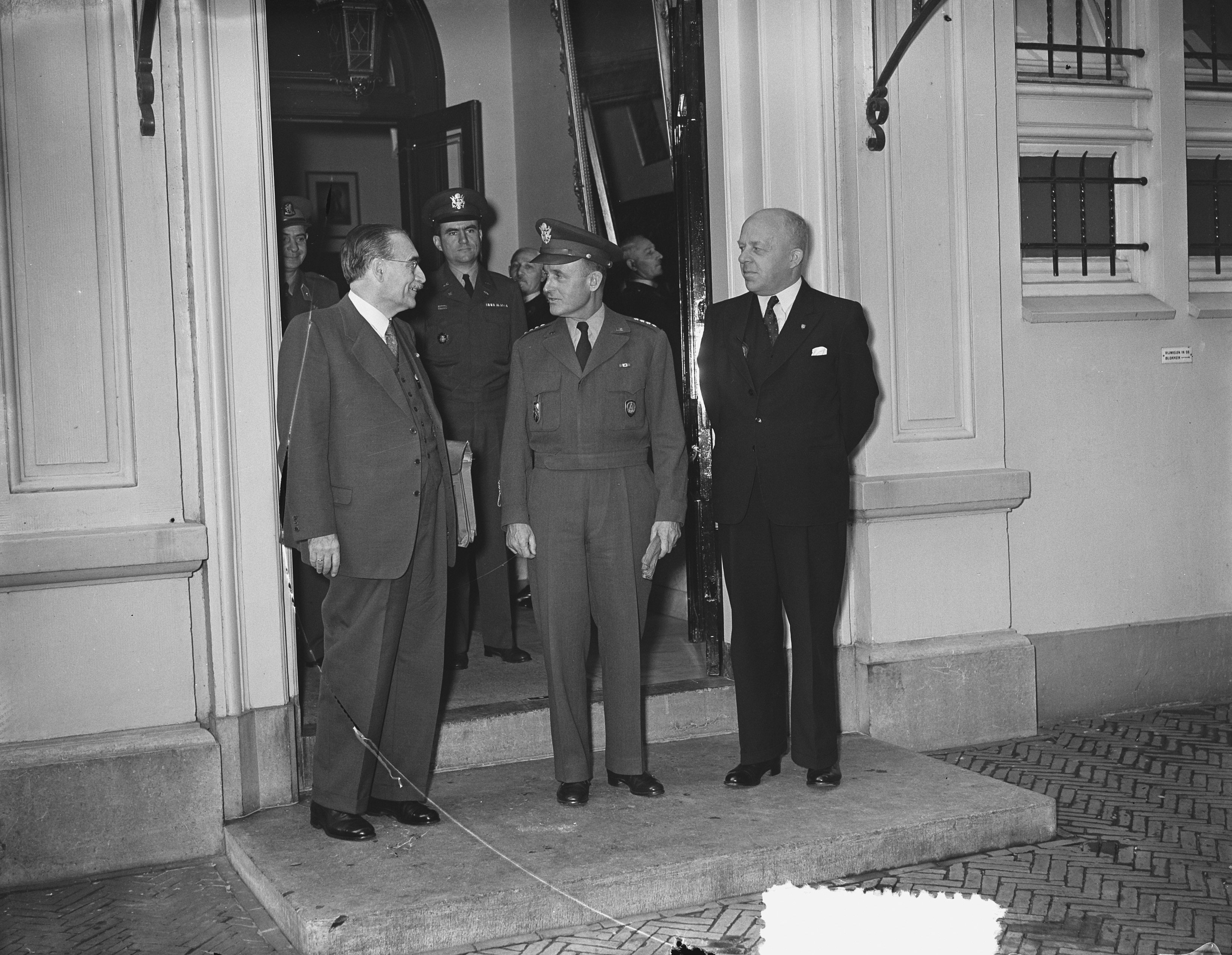
Prime Minister Willem Drees, Supreme Allied Commander Europe General Alfred Gruenther and Minister of Defence Kees Staf at the Ministry of General Affairs on 15 October 1953.

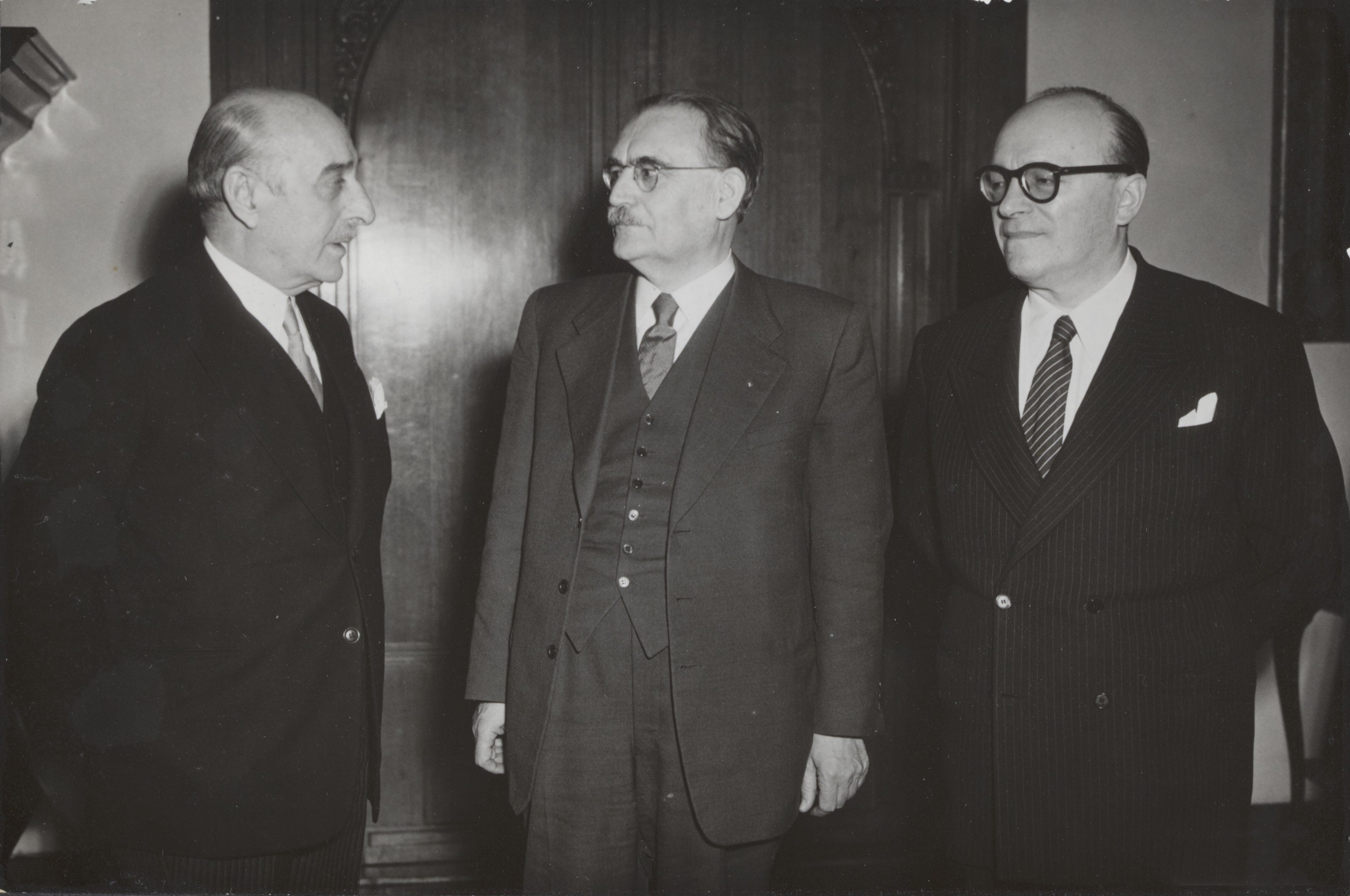
Prime Minister of Greece Alexandros Papagos, Prime Minister Willem Drees and Greek Minister for Foreign Affairs Stefanos Stefanopoulos at the Ministry of General Affairs on 2 February 1954.

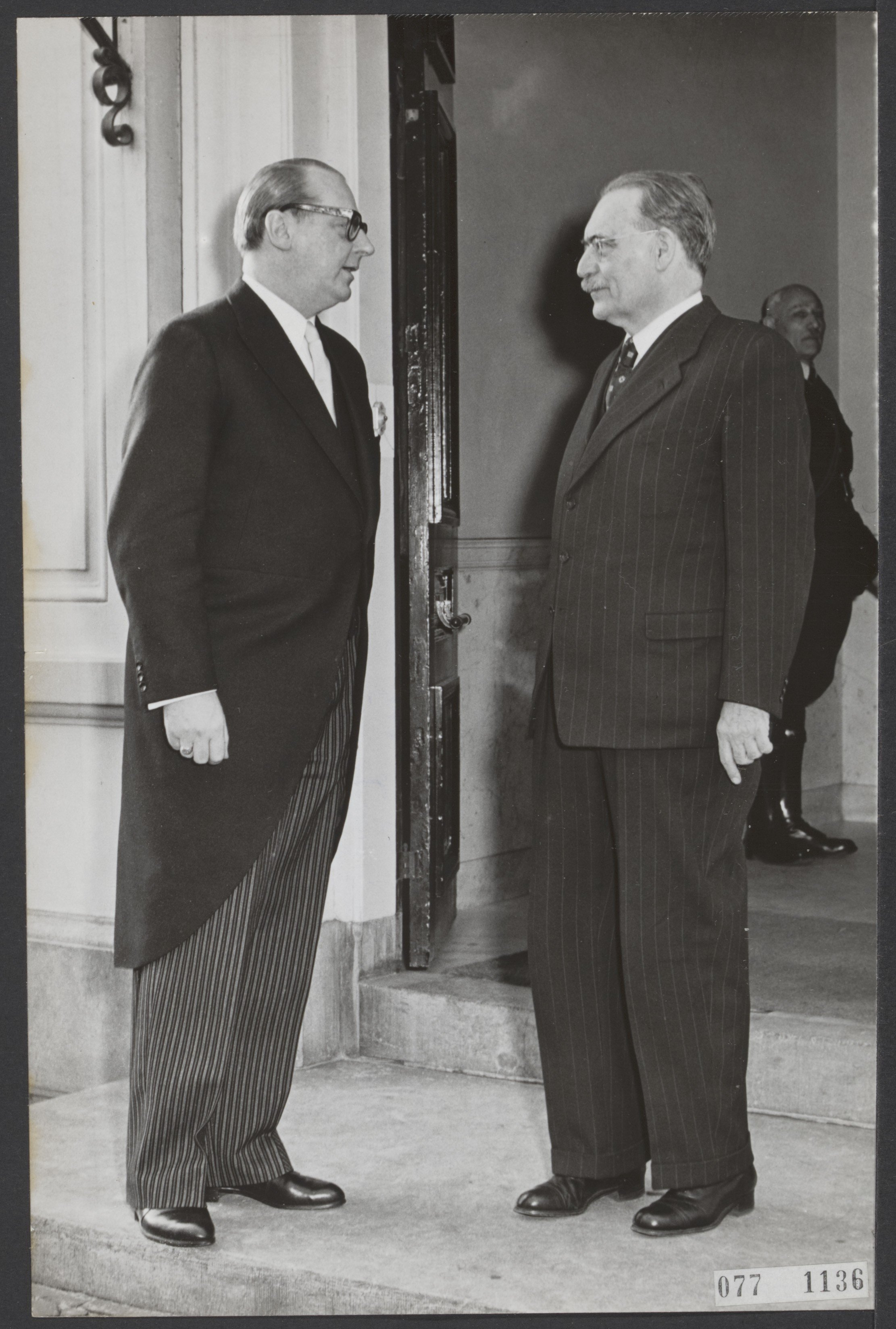
West-German Minister for Foreign Affairs Heinrich von Brentano and Prime Minister Willem Drees at the Ministry of General Affairs on 8 March 1956.

== Cabinet Members ==
Ministers		Title/Ministry/Portfolio(s)			Term of office	Party
Willem Drees	Willem Drees (1886–1988)	Prime Minister	General Affairs		7 August 1948 – 22 December 1958^{[Retained]} ^{[Continued]}	Labour Party
Louis Beel	Louis Beel (1902–1977)	Deputy; Prime Minister	Interior		2 September 1952 – 7 July 1956^{[App]}	Catholic; People's Party
Louis Beel	Louis Beel (1902–1977)	Minister	Interior		6 December 1951 – 7 July 1956^{[Retained]} ^{[App]}	Catholic; People's Party
Julius Christiaan van Oven	Julius Christiaan van Oven (1881–1963)	Minister	Interior		7 July 1956 – 13 October 1956^{[Acting]}	Labour Party
Johan Beyen	Johan Beyen (1897–1976)	Minister	Foreign Affairs		2 September 1952 – 13 October 1956	Independent
Jo van de Kieft	Jo van de Kieft (1884–1970)	Minister	Finance		2 September 1952 – 13 October 1956	Labour Party
Leen Donker	Leen Donker (1899–1956)	Minister	Justice		2 September 1952 – 4 February 1956^{[Died]}	Labour Party
Louis Beel	Louis Beel (1902–1977)	Minister	Justice		4 February 1956 – 15 February 1956^{[Ad Interim]}	Catholic; People's Party
Julius Christiaan van Oven	Julius Christiaan van Oven (1881–1963)	Minister	Justice		15 February 1956 – 13 October 1956	Labour Party
Jelle Zijlstra	Jelle Zijlstra (1918–2001)	Minister	Economic Affairs		2 September 1952 – 19 May 1959^{[Continued]}	Anti-Revolutionary; Party
Kees Staf	Kees Staf (1905–1973)	Minister	War and Navy		15 March 1951 – 19 May 1959^{[Retained]} ^{[Continued]}	Christian; Historical Union
Ko Suurhoff	Ko Suurhoff (1905–1967)	Minister	Social Affairs and Health		2 September 1952 – 22 December 1958^{[Continued]}	Labour Party
Jo Cals	Jo Cals (1914–1971)	Minister	Education, Arts and Sciences		2 September 1952 – 24 July 1963^{[Continued]}	Catholic; People's Party
Jacob Algera	Jacob Algera (1902–1966)	Minister	Transport and Water Management		2 September 1952 – 10 October 1958^{[Continued]}	Anti-Revolutionary; Party
Sicco Mansholt	Sicco Mansholt (1908–1995)	Minister	Agriculture, Fisheries and Food Supplies		25 June 1945 – 1 January 1958^{[Retained]} ^{[Continued]}	Labour Party
Herman Witte	Herman Witte (1909–1973)	Minister	Reconstruction and Housing		2 September 1952 – 13 October 1956	Catholic; People's Party
Louis Beel	Louis Beel (1902–1977)	Minister	Social Work		2 September 1952 – 9 September 1952^{[Ad Interim]}	Catholic; People's Party
Frans-Jozef van Thiel	Frans-Jozef van Thiel (1906–1993)	Minister	Social Work		9 September 1952 – 13 October 1956	Catholic; People's Party
Willem Kernkamp	Willem Kernkamp (1899–1956)	Minister	Colonial Affairs		2 September 1952 – 18 July 1956^{[Died]}	Christian; Historical Union
Kees Staf	Kees Staf (1905–1973)	Minister	Colonial Affairs		18 July 1956 – 16 February 1957^{[Acting]} ^{[Continued]}	Christian; Historical Union
Ministers without portfolio		Title/Ministry/Portfolio(s)			Term of office	Party
A. C. de Bruijn	A. C. de Bruijn (1887–1968)	Minister	Interior	• Public; Organisations	2 September 1952 – 13 October 1956	Catholic; People's Party
Joseph Luns	Joseph Luns (1911–2002)	Minister	Foreign Affairs	• United Nations • Netherlands- Indonesian Union • Netherlands; New Guinea • Benelux • International; Organizations	2 September 1952 – 13 October 1956	Catholic; People's Party
State Secretaries		Title/Ministry/Portfolio(s)			Term of office	Party
Wim van den Berge	Wim van den Berge (1905–1987)	State Secretary	Finance	• Fiscal Policy • Tax and Customs • Governmental; Budget	2 February 1953 – 13 October 1956	Independent
Gerard Veldkamp	Gerard Veldkamp (1921–1990)	State Secretary	Economic Affairs	• Small and Medium-sized; Businesses • Consumer; Protection • Tourism	10 October 1952 – 17 July 1961^{[Continued]}	Catholic; People's Party
Ferdinand Kranenburg	Ferdinand; Kranenburg (1911–1994)	State Secretary	War and Navy	• Army • Air Force	1 June 1951 – 1 June 1958^{[Retained]} ^{[Continued]}	Labour Party
Harry Moorman	Vice admiral Harry Moorman (1899–1971)	State Secretary	War and Navy	• Navy	1 May 1949 – 19 May 1959^{[Retained]} ^{[Continued]}	Catholic; People's Party
Piet Muntendam	Piet Muntendam (1901–1986)	State Secretary	Social Affairs and Health	• Primary; Healthcare • Elderly Care • Disability Policy	1 April 1950 – 1 October 1953^{[Retained]} ^{[Res]}	Labour Party
Aat van Rhijn	Aat van Rhijn (1892–1986)	State Secretary	Social Affairs and Health	• Social Security • Unemployment • Occupational; Safety • Social Services	15 February 1950 – 22 December 1958^{[Retained]} ^{[Continued]}	Labour Party
Anna de Waal	Anna de Waal (1906–1981)	State Secretary	Education, Arts and Sciences	• Primary; Education • Secondary; Education • Special; Education • Youth Care	2 February 1953 – 16 March 1957^{[Continued]}	Catholic; People's Party

^{Resigned}
^{Retained from the previous cabinet}
^{Continued in the next cabinet}
^{Acting}
^{Ad Interim}
^{Died in Office}
^{Appointed as Chairman of the Special State Commission}

== Trivia ==
- Nine cabinet members had previous experience as scholars and professors: Louis Beel (Administrative Law), Julius Christiaan van Oven (Roman Law), Jelle Zijlstra (Public Economics), Willem Kernkamp (Constitutional and Administrative Law and Arabic Literature), Willem Hendrik van den Berge (Public Economics), Gerard Veldkamp (Microeconomics), Piet Muntendam (Social Medicine), Aat van Rhijn (Fiscal Law) and Anna de Waal (Geography).
- Four cabinet members (later) served as Prime Minister: Willem Drees (1948–1958), Louis Beel (1946–1948) (1958–1959), Jelle Zijlstra (1966–1967) and Jo Cals (1965–1966).
- Four cabinet members would later be granted the honorary title of Minister of State: Willem Drees (1958), Louis Beel (1956), Jelle Zijlstra (1983) and Jo Cals (1966).
- Two cabinet members Johan Beyen and Sicco Mansholt are considered Founding fathers of the European Union.
- The age difference between oldest cabinet member Julius Christiaan van Oven (born 1881) and the youngest cabinet member Gerard Veldkamp (born 1921) was 39 years, 222 days.
- Had both the oldest and youngest cabinet members in Dutch History when they took office: Julius Christiaan van Oven was 74 years, 90 days years old and Gerard Veldkamp was 31 years, 105 days years old.
- Anna de Waal was the first female cabinet member in Dutch History.
