= Jo Cals =

Prime Minister of the Netherlands from 1965 to 1966

His Excellency Jo Cals
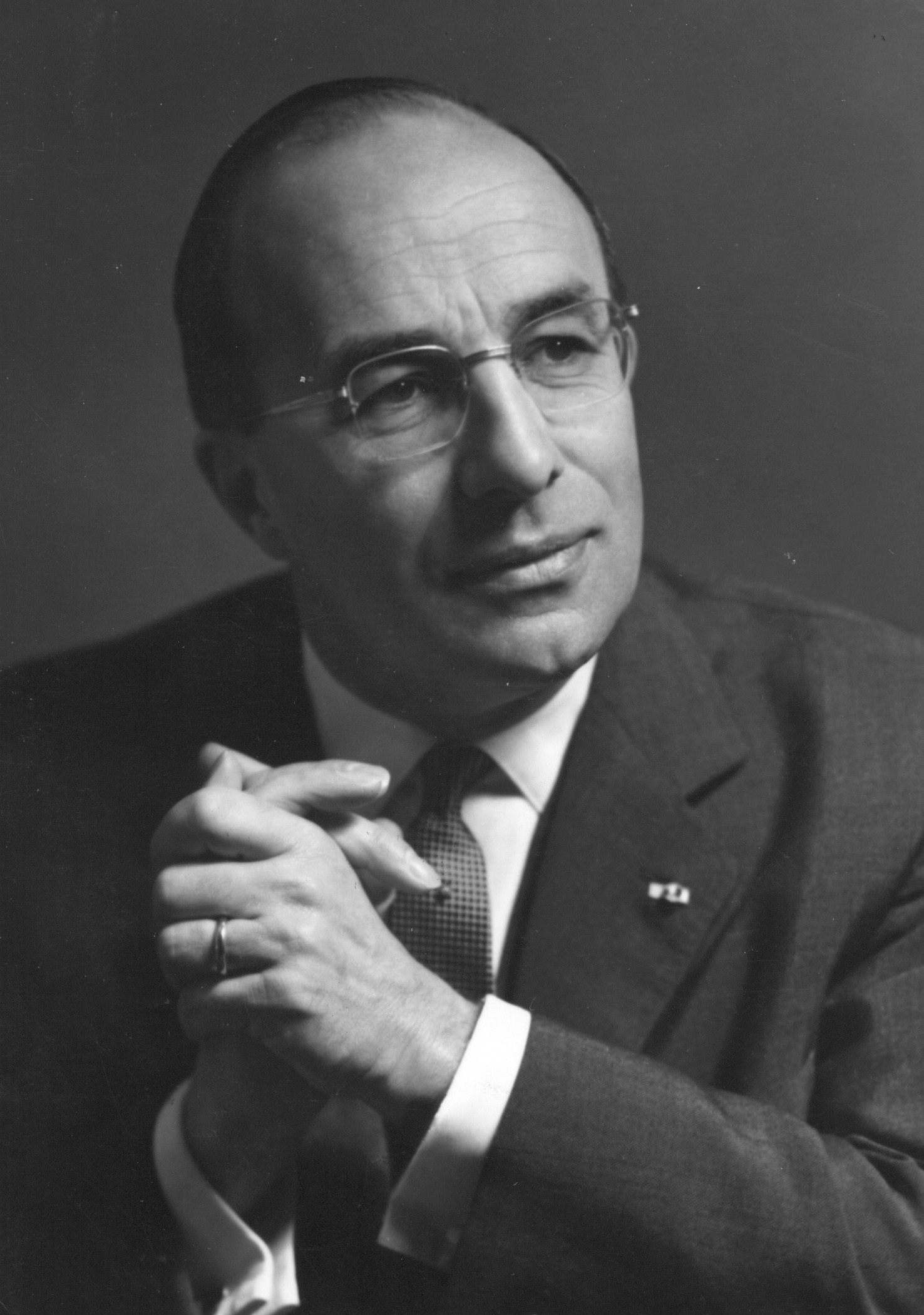
- Cals in 1966

Prime Minister of the Netherlands
- In office 14 April 1965 – 22 November 1966
- Monarch: Juliana
- Deputy: Anne Vondeling; Barend Biesheuvel
- Preceded by: Victor Marijnen
- Succeeded by: Jelle Zijlstra

Minister of Education, Arts and Sciences
- In office 4 February 1962 – 23 April 1963
- Prime Minister: Jan de Quay
- Preceded by: Marga Klompé (ad interim)
- Succeeded by: Marga Klompé (ad interim)
- In office 2 September 1952 – 7 November 1961
- Prime Minister: See list: Willem Drees (1952–1958) Louis Beel (1958–1959) Jan de Quay (1959–1961)
- Preceded by: Theo Rutten
- Succeeded by: Marga Klompé (ad interim)

State Secretary for Education, Arts and Sciences
- In office 15 March 1950 – 2 September 1952
- Prime Minister: Willem Drees
- Preceded by: Office established
- Succeeded by: Anna de Waal

Member of the House of Representatives
- In office 2 July 1963 – 14 April 1965
- In office 20 March 1959 – 19 May 1959
- In office 3 July 1956 – 3 October 1956
- In office 15 July 1952 – 2 September 1952
- In office 19 August 1948 – 15 March 1950

Personal details
- Born: Jozef Maria Laurens Theo Cals; 18 July 1914 Roermond, Netherlands
- Died: 30 December 1971 (aged 57) The Hague, Netherlands
- Party: Catholic People's Party (from 1945)
- Other political affiliations: Roman Catholic State Party (until 1945)
- Spouse: Truus van der Heijden (m. 1941)
- Children: 3 sons and 2 daughters
- Education: Radboud University Nijmegen (LL.B., LL.M.)
- Occupation: Politician · Diplomat · civil servant · Jurist · Lawyer · Prosecutor · Judge · Researcher · Corporate director · Nonprofit director · Academic administrator · Lobbyist · Teacher

Military service
- Allegiance: Netherlands
- Branch/service: Royal Netherlands Army
- Years of service: 1945 (Active duty); 1945–1946 (Reserve)
- Rank: Captain
- Unit: Justice Corps
- Battles/wars: World War II; Liberation of Arnhem

Jozef Maria Laurens Theo "Jo" Cals (18 July 1914 – 30 December 1971) was a Dutch politician of the Catholic People's Party (KVP) and jurist who served as Prime Minister of the Netherlands from 14 April 1965 until 22 November 1966.

Cals studied law at the Radboud University Nijmegen obtaining a Master of Laws degree and worked as a lawyer and prosecutor in Nijmegen from November 1940 until August 1948 and as researcher at his alma mater from February 1941 until May 1949. Cals also worked as a legal and economics teacher in Roermond from October 1943 until June 1945. Cals became a member of the House of Representatives shortly after 1948 general election taking office on 19 August 1948 serving as a frontbencher and spokesperson for education and social work. Following a cabinet reshuffle he was appointed as State Secretary for Education, Arts and Sciences in the Drees–Van Schaik cabinet, taking office on 15 March 1950. The Drees–Van Schaik cabinet fell on 24 January 1951 and was replaced by the first Drees cabinet, with Cals continuing his office. After the 1952 general election, Cals was appointed as Minister of Education, Arts and Sciences in the second Drees cabinet, taking office on 2 September 1952. After the 1956 general election, Cals retained his position in the third Drees cabinet. The third Drees cabinet fell on 11 December 1958 and was replaced by the caretaker second Beel cabinet, with Cals continuing his function. After the 1959 general election, Cals once again retained his office in the De Quay cabinet. After the 1963 general election, Cals was not offered a cabinet post in the new cabinet and returned to the House of Representatives on 2 July 1963, serving as a frontbencher and spokesperson for the interior and Kingdom relations. Cals also became active in the public sector as a non-profit director and served on several state commissions and councils on behalf of the government.

After the fall of the Marijnen cabinet, Cals was asked to lead a new cabinet. Following a successful cabinet formation, Cals formed the Cals cabinet and became Prime Minister of the Netherlands, taking office on 14 April 1965. The cabinet fell just one year into its term after a major political crisis and following a difficult cabinet formation was not included in a new cabinet. Cals left office upon the installation of the caretaker Zijlstra cabinet on 22 November 1966 and announced his retirement.

Cals semi-retired from active politics at just 52 and became active in the private and public sectors as a corporate and non-profit director, and served as a diplomat and lobbyist for several economic delegations and presided over several state commissions and councils for the government. Cals was known for his abilities as an efficient manager and his work ethics. During his premiership, his cabinet were responsible for major social reforms to social security, closing the mines in Limburg and stimulating urban development in the Randstad. Cals was granted the honorary title of Minister of State on 5 December 1966 and continued to comment on political affairs as a statesman until he was diagnosed with a terminal brain tumor and died in December 1971 at the age of just 57. He holds the distinction of as the fourth longest-serving cabinet member since 1850 with 14 years and 353 days and his premiership is consistently considered both by scholars and the public to have been average.

== Biography ==
=== Early life ===
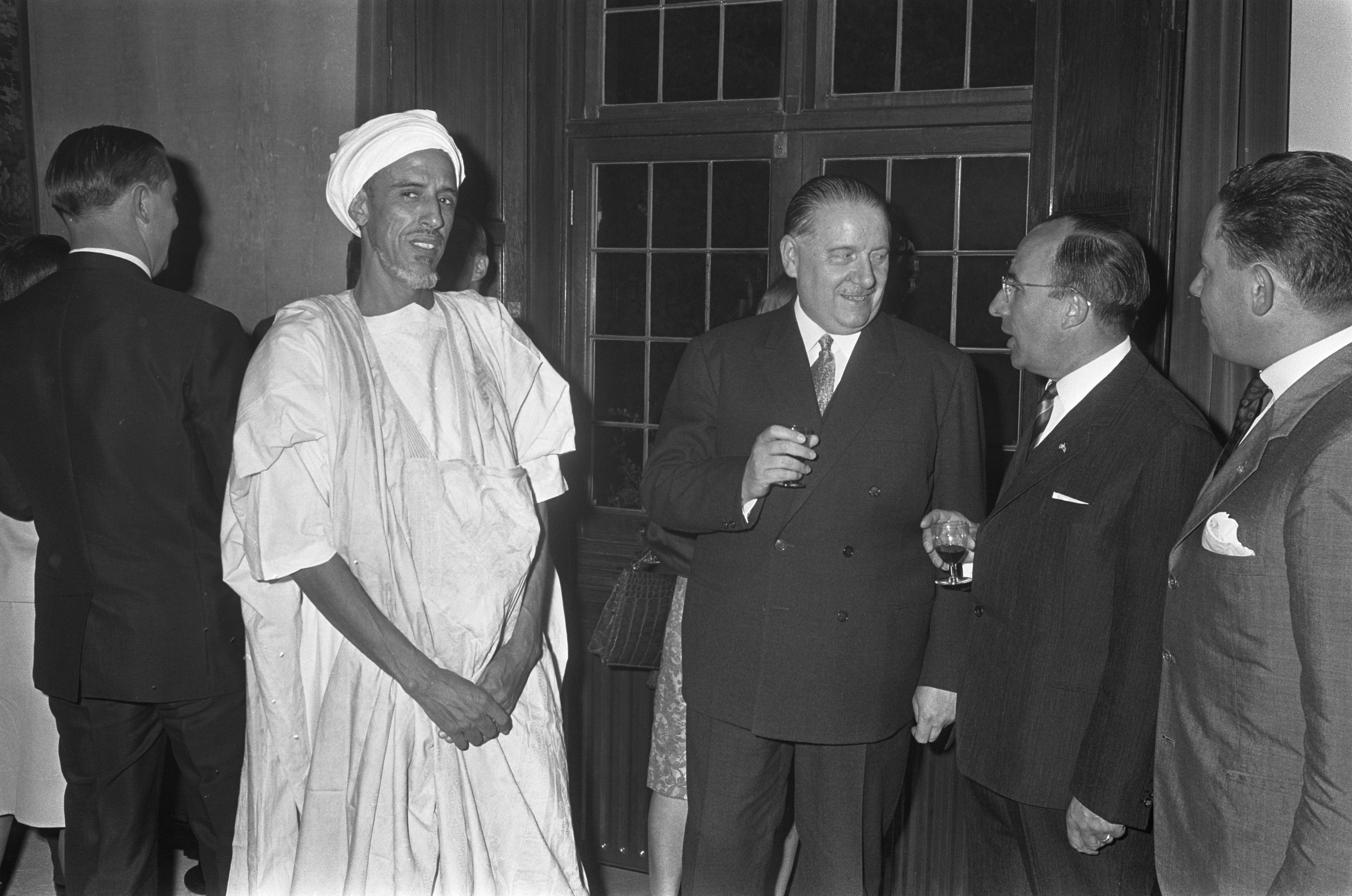
President of the European Parliament Alain Poher and Prime Minister Jo Cals during a meeting at the Catshuis on 24 May 1966.

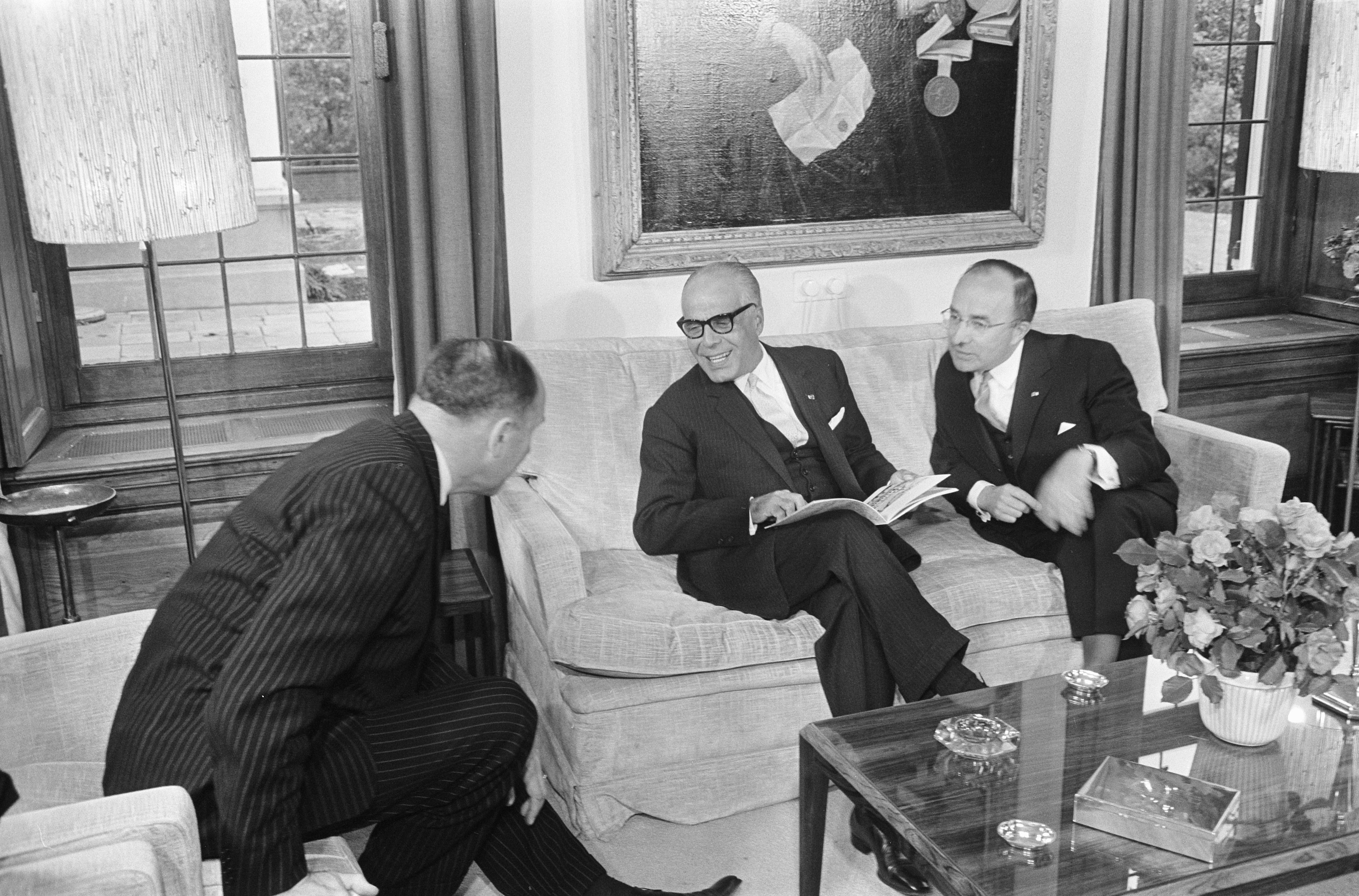
Minister of Foreign Affairs Joseph Luns, President of Tunisia Habib Bourguiba and Prime Minister Jo Cals during a meeting at the Catshuis on 7 July 1966.

Jozef Maria Laurens Theo Cals was born in Roermond on 18 July 1914. After completing his secondary education in his home town, he studied for the priesthood in Rolduc. In 1935, however, he interrupted his theological training to study law at the Radboud University Nijmegen, after graduating in 1940 he practised law in that same city up until 1950, in the meantime also teaching economics at his old secondary school in Roermond.

=== Politics ===
In 1945 Cals became leader of the Catholic People's Party in the municipal council of Nijmegen until 1946. He was elected to the House of Representatives in 1948. From 15 March 1950 to 2 September 1952 he was State Secretary for Education, Arts and Sciences, serving from 15 March 1950 until 2 September 1952 in the Drees-Van Schaik and Drees I cabinets. He became Minister of Education, Arts and Sciences serving from 2 September 1952 until 24 July 1963 in the cabinets Drees II and III, Beel II and De Quay, he helped pass the Mammoetwet, a law that transformed secondary education. In the debate, he spoke for 6 hours and 50 minutes, setting a record. In 1963, however, he returned to the House of Representatives. Alongside his duties there, he was a member of the board of governors of the University of Groningen, chairman of the Arts Council and a member of the Press Council.

In the aftermath of the collapse of the Marijnen cabinet, Cals became Prime Minister of the Netherlands on 14 April 1965. After two decades of economic growth, his cabinet experienced a slight recession. Plans to build sports halls, roads and houses had to be tempered. In Limburg the coal mines were closed and plans were drawn to educate and re-employ the former miners. There was also social unrest ('the sixties'), which became apparent in the Provo movement, construction worker protests, riots over the marriage of princess Beatrix in Amsterdam and the rise of new parties like Farmers' Party (BP), Pacifist Socialist Party (PSP), Reformed Political League (GPV) and the Democrats 66 (D'66). Especially the last party wanted to change the political order.

On 14 October 1966, Norbert Schmelzer, the leader of the Catholic People's Party and chair of its parliamentary group in the House of Representatives, tabled a motion that was interpreted as a motion of no confidence against the government and Prime Minister Cals. A shocking and surprised action in Dutch politics, later known as the Night of Schmelzer, it marked the first time that a motion of no confidence was tabled against a government by a member of a government party. The cabinet resigned the next day.

=== Scouting ===
Cals was in 1930, just after the foundation as a separate Scouting organisation, one of the first members of De Katholieke Verkenners (The Catholic Scouts). He went to the 4th World Scout Jamboree in Gödöllo, Hungary in 1933. After the liberation of the southern part of the Netherlands in 1944 he was one of the main forces in rebuilding Catholic Scouting as a separate Scouting movement in the Netherlands. During his second term as Minister of Education, Arts and Sciences, the State Secretary for Education, Arts and Sciences was his former Scout Master René Höppener.

=== Trivia ===
Between 1968 and 1970, Cals was in charge of the Dutch entry to the Expo '70 in Japan. From 1967 he was chairman of the National Advisory Committee on the amendment of the Constitution.

Cals was a hard worker but this was at the expense of his health, he died from a brain tumor in the MCH Westeinde hospital in The Hague on 30 December 1971 at the age of 57.

== Decorations ==
Honours
Ribbon bar	Honour	Country	Date	Comment
	Knight of the Order of the Holy Sepulchre	Holy See		
	Knight Grand Cross of the Order of Orange-Nassau	Netherlands	27 July 1963	
	Commander of the Order of the Netherlands Lion	Netherlands	5 December 1966	

Honorific Titles
Ribbon bar	Honour	Country	Date	Comment
	Minister of State	Netherlands	5 December 1966	Style of Excellency

Political offices
New office	State Secretary for Education, Arts and Sciences; 1950–1952	Succeeded by Anna de Waal
Preceded by Theo Rutten	Minister of Education, Arts and Sciences; 1952–1961; 1962–1963	Succeeded by Marga Klompé; Ad interim
Preceded by Marga Klompé; Ad interim	Minister of Education, Arts and Sciences; 1952–1961; 1962–1963	Succeeded by Marga Klompé; Ad interim
Preceded by Victor Marijnen	Prime Minister of the Netherlands; Minister of General Affairs; 1965–1966	Succeeded by Jelle Zijlstra
Civic offices
Preceded by Louis Regout Jr.	Chairman of the Supervisory board of the Mijnraad; Ad interim 1950	Succeeded by Louis Regout Jr.
Unknown	Chairman of the Supervisory board of the Raad voor de Kunst; 1963–1965	Unknown
Business positions
Unknown	Chairman of the Supervisory board of Elsevier; 1968–1971	Unknown
Non-profit organization positions
Unknown	Chairman of The Catholic Scouts; 1949–1950	Unknown
Unknown	Vice Chairman of Scouting Nederland; 1949–1950	Unknown
Unknown	Chairman of the Supervisory board of Oxfam Novib; 1970–1971	Unknown
Academic offices
Unknown	Chairman of the Education board of the University of Groningen; 1963–1965	Unknown
