= Second Beel cabinet =

Dutch cabinet, 1958 to 1959

- Cabinet of the Netherlands

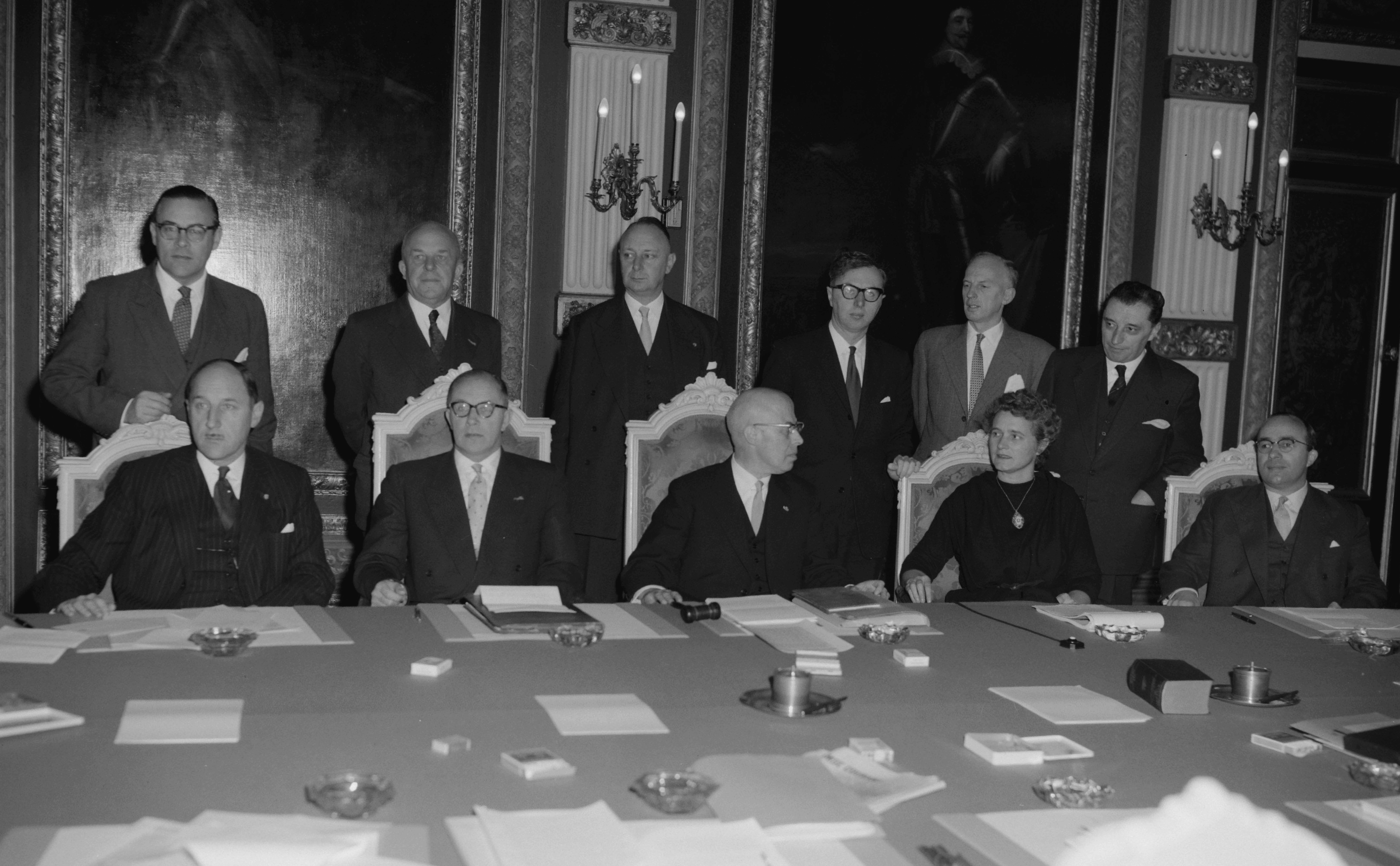
- First meeting of the cabinet in the Trêveszaal on 23 December 1958
- Date formed: 22 December 1958
- Date dissolved: 19 May 1959; 148 days in office (Demissionary from 12 March 1959)

People and organisations
- Monarch: Queen Juliana
- Prime Minister: Louis Beel
- Deputy Prime Minister: Teun Struycken
- No. of ministers: 10
- Member party: Catholic People's Party (KVP); Anti-Revolutionary Party (ARP); Christian Historical Union (CHU)
- Status in legislature: Centre-right; Majority government (Caretaker)

History
- Outgoing election: 1959 election
- Legislature terms: 1956–1959
- Incoming formation: 1958 formation
- Outgoing formation: 1959 formation
- Predecessor: Third Drees cabinet
- Successor: De Quay cabinet

The second Beel cabinet was the executive branch of the Dutch Government from 22 December 1958 until 19 May 1959. The cabinet was formed by the Christian-democratic Catholic People's Party (KVP), Anti-Revolutionary Party (ARP), and the Christian Historical Union (CHU) after the fall of the previous Third Drees cabinet. The caretaker cabinet was a centre-right coalition and had a slim majority in the House of Representatives with former Catholic Prime Minister Louis Beel returning as Prime Minister and dual served as Minister of Social Affairs and Health. Prominent Catholic politician Teun Struycken continued as Deputy Prime Minister and Minister of the Interior, Property and Public Organisations from previous cabinet and dual served as Minister of Justice.

The cabinet served during final years of the turbulent 1950s. Domestically its primary objective was to make preparations for a snap election in 1959. Following the election the cabinet continued in a demissionary capacity until it was replaced by the De Quay cabinet.

== Formation ==
On 11 December 1958 the Third Drees cabinet fell after a crisis between the Labour Party and the Catholic People's Party over the prolonging for a proposed tax increase from the initial two years to only one fiscal year. Following the fall of the cabinet the Labour Party left the coalition and the Catholic People's Party, Anti-Revolutionary Party and Christian Historical Union formed a rump cabinet. Former Prime Minister Louis Beel was appointed as Prime Minister on 22 December 1958.

== Cabinet Members ==
Ministers		Title/Ministry/Portfolio(s)			Term of office	Party
Louis Beel	Dr. Louis Beel (1902–1977)	Prime Minister	General Affairs		22 December 1958 – 19 May 1959	Catholic; People's Party
Louis Beel	Dr. Louis Beel (1902–1977)	Minister	Social Affairs and Health		22 December 1958 – 19 May 1959	Catholic; People's Party
Teun Struycken	Teun Struycken (1906–1977)	Deputy; Prime Minister	Interior, Property and Public; Organisations		29 October 1956 – 19 May 1959^{[Retained]}	Catholic; People's Party
Teun Struycken	Teun Struycken (1906–1977)	Minister	Interior, Property and Public; Organisations		29 October 1956 – 19 May 1959^{[Retained]}	Catholic; People's Party
Teun Struycken	Teun Struycken (1906–1977)	Minister	Justice		22 December 1958 – 19 May 1959	Catholic; People's Party
Joseph Luns	Joseph Luns (1911–2002)	Minister	Foreign Affairs		13 October 1956 – 6 July 1971^{[Retained]} ^{[Continued]}	Catholic; People's Party
Jelle Zijlstra	Dr. Jelle Zijlstra (1918–2001)	Minister	Finance		22 December 1958 – 24 July 1963^{[Continued]}	Anti-Revolutionary; Party
Jelle Zijlstra	Dr. Jelle Zijlstra (1918–2001)	Minister	Economic Affairs		2 September 1952 – 19 May 1959^{[Retained]}	Anti-Revolutionary; Party
Kees Staf	Kees Staf (1905–1973)	Minister	War and Navy		15 March 1951 – 19 May 1959^{[Retained]}	Christian; Historical Union
Kees Staf	Kees Staf (1905–1973)	Minister	Agriculture, Fisheries and Food Supplies		22 December 1958 – 19 May 1959	Christian; Historical Union
Jo Cals	Jo Cals (1914–1971)	Minister	Education, Arts and Sciences		2 September 1952 – 24 July 1963^{[Retained]} ^{[Continued]}	Catholic; People's Party
Jan van Aartsen	Jan van Aartsen (1909–1992)	Minister	Transport and Water Management		1 November 1958 – 19 May 1959^{[Retained]}	Anti-Revolutionary; Party
Herman Witte	Herman Witte (1909–1973)	Minister	Housing and Construction		2 September 1952 – 19 May 1959^{[Retained]}	Catholic; People's Party
Marga Klompé	Dr. Marga Klompé (1912–1986)	Minister	Social Work		13 October 1956 – 24 July 1963^{[Retained]} ^{[Continued]}	Catholic; People's Party
Gerard Helders	Gerard Helders (1905–2013)	Minister	Colonial Affairs		16 February 1957 – 19 May 1959^{[Retained]}	Christian; Historical Union
State Secretaries		Title/Ministry/Portfolio(s)			Term of office	Party
Norbert Schmelzer	Norbert Schmelzer (1921–2008)	State Secretary	Interior, Property and Public; Organisations	• Public; Organisations	29 October 1956 – 19 May 1959^{[Retained]}	Catholic; People's Party
Gerard Veldkamp	Dr. Gerard Veldkamp (1921–1990)	State Secretary	Economic Affairs	• Small and Medium-sized; Businesses • Consumer; Protection • Tourism	10 October 1952 – 17 July 1961^{[Retained]} ^{[Continued]}	Catholic; People's Party
Harry Moorman	Vice admiral Harry Moorman (1899–1971)	State Secretary	Navy	• Navy	1 May 1949 – 19 May 1959^{[Retained]}	Catholic; People's Party
René Höppener	René Höppener (1903–1983)	State Secretary	Education, Arts and Sciences	• Youth Care • Nature • Media • Culture • Art • Recreation • Sport	12 November 1956 – 19 May 1959^{[Retained]}	Catholic; People's Party

^{Retained from the previous cabinet}
^{Continued in the next cabinet}
