= Deputy Prime Minister of the Netherlands =

Government official in the Netherlands

Deputy Prime Minister of the Kingdom of Netherlands
- Viceminister-president van Nederland
- State Coat of the Kingdom of the Netherlands

- Flag of the Kingdom of the Netherlands
- Incumbent; Dilan Yeşilgöz; Bart van den Brink
- Member of: Council of Ministers
- Appointer: The Monarch; on advice of the Prime Minister
- Formation: 25 June 1945; 81 years ago
- First holder: Willem Drees
- Salary: €144,000 annually (including €7,887.24 expenses)

The deputy prime minister of the Netherlands (Dutch: Viceminister-president van Nederland or Vicepremier van Nederland) is the official deputy of the head of government of the Netherlands. In the absence of the prime minister of the Netherlands the deputy prime minister takes over his functions, such as chairing the Cabinet of the Netherlands and the Council of Ministers of the Netherlands. Conventionally, all of the junior partners in the coalition get one deputy, and the deputies are ranked according to the size of their respective parties in the House of Representatives.

== List of deputy prime ministers of the Netherlands ==
Deputy Prime Minister		Position	Term of office	Party	Prime Minister (Cabinet)
Willem Drees	Willem Drees (1886–1988)	Minister of Social Affairs	25 June 1945 – 3 July 1946	Social Democratic; Workers' Party	Willem Schermerhorn (Schermerhorn–Drees)
Willem Drees	Willem Drees (1886–1988)	Minister of Social Affairs	3 July 1946 – 7 August 1948	Labour Party	Louis Beel (Beel I)
Josef van Schaik	Josef van Schaik (1882–1962)	Minister without Portfolio for the Interior	7 August 1948 – 15 March 1951	Catholic; People's Party	Willem Drees (Drees–Van Schaik)
Frans Teulings	Frans Teulings (1891–1966)	Minister without Portfolio for the Interior	15 March 1951 – 2 September 1952	Catholic; People's Party	Willem Drees (Drees I)
Louis Beel	Dr. Louis Beel (1902–1977) (Resigned)	Minister of the Interior	2 September 1952 – 7 July 1956	Catholic; People's Party	Willem Drees (Drees II)
Teun Struycken	Teun Struycken (1906–1977)	Minister of the Interior, Property and Public; Sector Organisations	29 October 1956 – 22 December 1958	Catholic; People's Party	Willem Drees (Drees III)
Teun Struycken	Teun Struycken (1906–1977)	Minister of the Interior, Property and Public; Sector Organisations	22 December 1958 – 19 May 1959	Catholic; People's Party	Louis Beel (Beel II)
Teun Struycken	Teun Struycken (1906–1977)	Minister of Justice	22 December 1958 – 19 May 1959	Catholic; People's Party	Louis Beel (Beel II)
Henk Korthals	Henk Korthals (1911–1976)	Minister of Transport and Water Management	19 May 1959 – 24 July 1963	People's Party for Freedom and Democracy	Jan de Quay (De Quay)
Henk Korthals	Henk Korthals (1911–1976)	Minister for Suriname and Netherlands Antilles Affairs	19 May 1959 – 24 July 1963	People's Party for Freedom and Democracy	Jan de Quay (De Quay)
Barend Biesheuvel	Barend Biesheuvel (1920–2001)	Minister of Agriculture and Fisheries	24 July 1963 – 14 April 1965	Anti-Revolutionary; Party	Victor Marijnen (Marijnen)
Barend Biesheuvel	Barend Biesheuvel (1920–2001)	Minister for Suriname and Netherlands Antilles Affairs	24 July 1963 – 14 April 1965	Anti-Revolutionary; Party	Victor Marijnen (Marijnen)
Anne Vondeling	Dr. Anne Vondeling (1916–1979); First Deputy PM	Minister of Finance	14 April 1965 – 22 November 1966	Labour Party	Jo Cals (Cals)
Barend Biesheuvel	Barend Biesheuvel (1920–2001); Second Deputy PM	Minister of Agriculture and Fisheries	14 April 1965 – 22 November 1966	Anti-Revolutionary; Party	Jo Cals (Cals)
Barend Biesheuvel	Barend Biesheuvel (1920–2001); Second Deputy PM	Minister for Suriname and Netherlands Antilles Affairs	14 April 1965 – 22 November 1966	Anti-Revolutionary; Party	Jo Cals (Cals)
Jan de Quay	Dr. Jan de Quay (1901–1985); First Deputy PM	Minister of Transport and Water Management	22 November 1966 – 5 April 1967	Catholic; People's Party	Jelle Zijlstra (Zijlstra)
Barend Biesheuvel	Barend Biesheuvel (1920–2001); Second Deputy PM	Minister of Agriculture and Fisheries	22 November 1966 – 5 April 1967	Anti-Revolutionary; Party	Jelle Zijlstra (Zijlstra)
Barend Biesheuvel	Barend Biesheuvel (1920–2001); Second Deputy PM	Minister for Suriname and Netherlands Antilles Affairs	22 November 1966 – 5 April 1967	Anti-Revolutionary; Party	Jelle Zijlstra (Zijlstra)
Johan Witteveen	Dr. Johan Witteveen (1921–2019); First Deputy PM	Minister of Finance	5 April 1967 – 6 July 1971	People's Party for Freedom and Democracy	Piet de Jong (De Jong)
Joop Bakker	Joop Bakker (1921–2003); Second Deputy PM	Minister of Transport and Water Management	5 April 1967 – 6 July 1971	Anti-Revolutionary; Party	Piet de Jong (De Jong)
Joop Bakker	Joop Bakker (1921–2003); Second Deputy PM	Minister for Suriname and Netherlands Antilles Affairs	5 April 1967 – 6 July 1971	Anti-Revolutionary; Party	Piet de Jong (De Jong)
Roelof Nelissen	Roelof Nelissen (1931–2019); First Deputy PM	Minister of Finance	6 July 1971 – 11 May 1973	Catholic; People's Party	Barend Biesheuvel (Biesheuvel I • II)
Roelof Nelissen	Roelof Nelissen (1931–2019); First Deputy PM	Minister for Suriname and Netherlands Antilles Affairs	6 July 1971 – 28 January 1972	Catholic; People's Party	Barend Biesheuvel (Biesheuvel I • II)
Molly Geertsema	Molly Geertsema (1918–1991); Second Deputy PM	Minister of the Interior	6 July 1971 – 11 May 1973	People's Party for Freedom and Democracy	Barend Biesheuvel (Biesheuvel I • II)
Molly Geertsema	Molly Geertsema (1918–1991); Second Deputy PM	Minister for Suriname and Netherlands Antilles Affairs	1 January 1973 – 11 May 1973	People's Party for Freedom and Democracy	Barend Biesheuvel (Biesheuvel I • II)
Dries van Agt	Dries van Agt (1931–2024) (Resigned)	Minister of Justice	11 May 1973 – 8 September 1977	Catholic; People's Party	Joop den Uyl (Den Uyl)
Gaius de Gaay Fortman	Dr. Gaius de Gaay Fortman (1911–1997)	Minister of Justice	8 September 1977 – 19 December 1977	Anti-Revolutionary; Party	Joop den Uyl (Den Uyl)
Gaius de Gaay Fortman	Dr. Gaius de Gaay Fortman (1911–1997)	Minister of the Interior	8 September 1977 – 19 December 1977	Anti-Revolutionary; Party	Joop den Uyl (Den Uyl)
Gaius de Gaay Fortman	Dr. Gaius de Gaay Fortman (1911–1997)	Minister for Suriname and Netherlands Antilles Affairs	8 September 1977 – 19 December 1977	Anti-Revolutionary; Party	Joop den Uyl (Den Uyl)
Hans Wiegel	Hans Wiegel (1941–2025)	Minister of the Interior	19 December 1977 – 11 September 1981	People's Party for Freedom and Democracy	Dries van Agt (Van Agt I)
Joop den Uyl	Joop den Uyl (1919–1987) (Resigned); First Deputy PM	Minister of Social Affairs and Employment	11 September 1981 – 29 May 1982	Labour Party	Dries van Agt (Van Agt II)
Joop den Uyl	Joop den Uyl (1919–1987) (Resigned); First Deputy PM	Minister for Netherlands; Antilles Affairs	11 September 1981 – 29 May 1982	Labour Party	Dries van Agt (Van Agt II)
Jan Terlouw	Dr. Jan Terlouw (1931–2025); Second Deputy PM (until 29/5/82)	Minister of Economic Affairs	11 September 1981 – 29 May 1982	Democrats 66	Dries van Agt (Van Agt II)
Jan Terlouw	Dr. Jan Terlouw (1931–2025); Second Deputy PM (until 29/5/82)	Minister of Economic Affairs	29 May 1982 – 4 November 1982	Democrats 66	Dries van Agt (Van Agt III)
Gijs van Aardenne	Gijs van Aardenne (1930–1995)	Minister of Economic Affairs	4 November 1982 – 14 July 1986	People's Party for Freedom and Democracy	Ruud Lubbers (Lubbers I)
Rudolf de Korte	Dr. Rudolf de Korte (1936–2020)	Minister of Economic Affairs	14 July 1986 – 7 November 1989	People's Party for Freedom and Democracy	Ruud Lubbers (Lubbers II)
Wim Kok	Wim Kok (1938–2018)	Minister of Finance	7 November 1989 – 22 August 1994	Labour Party	Ruud Lubbers (Lubbers III)
Hans Dijkstal	Hans Dijkstal (1943–2010); First Deputy PM	Minister of the Interior	22 August 1994 – 3 August 1998	People's Party for Freedom and Democracy	Wim Kok (Kok I)
Hans van Mierlo	Hans van Mierlo (1931–2010); Second Deputy PM	Minister of Foreign Affairs	22 August 1994 – 3 August 1998	Democrats 66	Wim Kok (Kok I)
Annemarie Jorritsma	Annemarie Jorritsma (born 1950); First Deputy PM	Minister of Economic Affairs	3 August 1998 – 22 July 2002	People's Party for Freedom and Democracy	Wim Kok (Kok II)
Els Borst	Dr. Els Borst (1932–2014); Second Deputy PM	Minister of Health, Welfare and Sport	3 August 1998 – 22 July 2002	Democrats 66	Wim Kok (Kok II)
Eduard Bomhoff	Dr. Eduard Bomhoff (born 1944) (Resigned); First Deputy PM	Minister of Health, Welfare and Sport	22 July 2002 – 16 October 2002	Pim Fortuyn List	Jan Peter Balkenende (Balkenende I)
Johan Remkes	Johan Remkes (born 1951)	Minister of the Interior and Kingdom Relations	22 July 2002 – 16 October 2002; Second Deputy PM	People's Party for Freedom and Democracy	Jan Peter Balkenende (Balkenende I)
Johan Remkes	Johan Remkes (born 1951)	Minister of the Interior and Kingdom Relations	16 October 2002 – 27 May 2003; First Deputy PM	People's Party for Freedom and Democracy	Jan Peter Balkenende (Balkenende I)
Roelf de Boer	Roelf de Boer (born 1949); Second Deputy PM	Minister of Transport and Water Management	18 October 2002 – 27 May 2003	Pim Fortuyn List	Jan Peter Balkenende (Balkenende I)
Gerrit Zalm	Gerrit Zalm (born 1952); First Deputy PM	Minister of Finance	27 May 2003 – 7 July 2006	People's Party for Freedom and Democracy	Jan Peter Balkenende (Balkenende II)
Gerrit Zalm	Gerrit Zalm (born 1952); First Deputy PM	Minister of Economic Affairs; Interim	3 July 2006 – 7 July 2006	People's Party for Freedom and Democracy	Jan Peter Balkenende (Balkenende II)
Thom de Graaf	Thom de Graaf (born 1957) (Resigned); Second Deputy PM	Minister for Government Reform and Kingdom Relations	27 May 2003 – 23 March 2005	Democrats 66	Jan Peter Balkenende (Balkenende II)
Laurens Jan Brinkhorst	Laurens Jan; Brinkhorst (born 1937) (Resigned); Second Deputy PM	Minister of Economic Affairs	31 March 2005 – 3 July 2006	Democrats 66	Jan Peter Balkenende (Balkenende II)
Gerrit Zalm	Gerrit Zalm (born 1952)	Minister of Finance	7 July 2006 – 22 February 2007	People's Party for Freedom and Democracy	Jan Peter Balkenende (Balkenende III)
Wouter Bos	Wouter Bos (born 1963) (Resigned); First Deputy PM	Minister of Finance	22 February 2007 – 23 February 2010	Labour Party	Jan Peter Balkenende (Balkenende IV)
André Rouvoet	André Rouvoet (born 1962)	Minister of Youth and Family Policy; Second Deputy PM	22 February 2007 – 23 February 2010	Christian Union	Jan Peter Balkenende (Balkenende IV)
André Rouvoet	André Rouvoet (born 1962)	Minister of Education, Culture and Science	23 February 2010 – 14 October 2010	Christian Union	Jan Peter Balkenende (Balkenende IV)
André Rouvoet	André Rouvoet (born 1962)	Minister of Youth and Family Policy	23 February 2010 – 14 October 2010	Christian Union	Jan Peter Balkenende (Balkenende IV)
Maxime Verhagen	Maxime Verhagen (born 1956)	Minister of Economic Affairs, Agriculture and Innovation	14 October 2010 – 5 November 2012	Christian Democratic Appeal	Mark Rutte (Rutte I)
Lodewijk Asscher	Dr. Lodewijk Asscher (born 1974)	Minister of Social Affairs and Employment	5 November 2012 – 26 October 2017	Labour Party	Mark Rutte (Rutte II)
Hugo De Jonge	Hugo de Jonge (born 1977); First Deputy PM	Minister of Health, Welfare and Sport	26 October 2017 – 10 January 2022	Christian Democratic Appeal	Mark Rutte (Rutte III)
Kajsa Ollongren	Jonkvrouw; Kajsa Ollongren (born 1967); Leave; Second Deputy PM	Minister of the Interior and Kingdom Relations	26 October 2017 – 1 November 2019	Democrats 66	Mark Rutte (Rutte III)
Kajsa Ollongren	Jonkvrouw; Kajsa Ollongren (born 1967); Leave; Second Deputy PM	Minister of the Interior and Kingdom Relations	14 May 2020 – 10 January 2022	Democrats 66	Mark Rutte (Rutte III)
Carola Schouten	Carola Schouten (born 1977); Third Deputy PM	Minister of Agriculture, Nature and Food Quality	26 October 2017 – 10 January 2022	Christian Union	Mark Rutte (Rutte III)
Wouter Koolmees	Wouter Koolmees (born 1977); Acting; Second Deputy PM	Minister of Social Affairs and Employment	1 November 2019 – 14 May 2020	Democrats 66	Mark Rutte (Rutte III)
Sigrid Kaag	Sigrid Kaag (born 1961); First Deputy PM	Minister of Finance	10 January 2022 – 8 January 2024	Democrats 66	Mark Rutte (Rutte IV)
Wopke Hoekstra	Wopke Hoekstra (born 1975); Second Deputy PM	Minister of Foreign Affairs	10 January 2022 – 1 September 2023	Christian; Democratic Appeal	Mark Rutte (Rutte IV)
Carola Schouten	Carola Schouten (born 1977); Third Deputy PM	Minister for Poverty Policy, Participation and Pensions	10 January 2022 – 2 July 2024	Christian Union	Mark Rutte (Rutte IV)
Karien van Gennip	Karien van Gennip (born 1968); Second Deputy PM	Minister for Social Affairs and Employment	5 September 2023 – 2 July 2024	Christian; Democratic Appeal	Mark Rutte (Rutte IV)
Rob Jetten	Rob Jetten (born 1987); First Deputy PM	Minister for Climate and Energy Policy	8 January 2024 – 2 July 2024	Democrats 66	Mark Rutte (Rutte IV)
Fleur Agema	Fleur Agema (born 1976); First Deputy PM	Minister of Health, Welfare and Sport	2 July 2024 – 3 June 2025	Party for Freedom	Dick Schoof (Schoof)
Sophie Hermans	Sophie Hermans (born 1981); First Deputy PM	Minister of Climate; Policy and Green Growth	2 July 2024 – 23 February 2026	People's Party for Freedom and Democracy	Dick Schoof (Schoof)
Eddy van Hijum	Eddy van Hijum (born 1972); Second Deputy PM	Minister of Social Affairs and Employment	2 July 2024 – 22 August 2025	New Social Contract	Dick Schoof (Schoof)
Mona Keijzer	Mona Keijzer (born 1968); Second Deputy PM	Minister of Housing and Spatial Planning	2 July 2024 – 23 February 2026	Farmer– Citizen Movement	Dick Schoof (Schoof)
	Dilan Yeşilgöz (born 1977); First Deputy PM	Minister of Defence	23. February 2026 –; present	People's Party for Freedom and Democracy	Rob Jetten (Jetten)
	Bart van den Brink (born 1978); Second Deputy PM	Minister of Asylum and Migration	23. February 2026 –; present	Christian; Democratic Appeal	Rob Jetten (Jetten)

^{First Deputy Prime Minister}
^{Second Deputy Prime Minister}
^{Third Deputy Prime Minister}
^{Fourth Deputy Prime Minister}
^{Acting}
^{Ad interim}
^{Extended medical leave of absence from 1 November 2019 until 14 May 2020}
