= Master of Science in Engineering =

Master's degree awarded for post-graduate study in engineering

A Master of Science in Engineering (MSE) is an academic graduate degree awarded by universities in many countries. It is differentiated from a Master of Engineering (a professional degree). A MSE (Dipl.-Ing.) can require completion of a thesis and qualifies the holder to apply for a program leading to a Doctor of Philosophy (often abbreviated PhD or DPhil) in engineering, while a Master of Engineering can require completion of a project rather than thesis and usually does not qualify its holder to apply for a PhD or DPhil in engineering science.

The MSE is considered equivalent to diplom degree in engineering in the countries that do not have a specific distinction between MSE and Master of Engineering.

In the UK the MEng is an extended undergraduate degree, and the MSc is a one year postgraduate degree for those who already have a BEng. They both contribute to obtaining a chartered engineer qualification.

== See also ==
- Engineering education, about the structure in many countries
- Engineer's degree
