= Herman Witte =

Dutch politician (1909–1973)

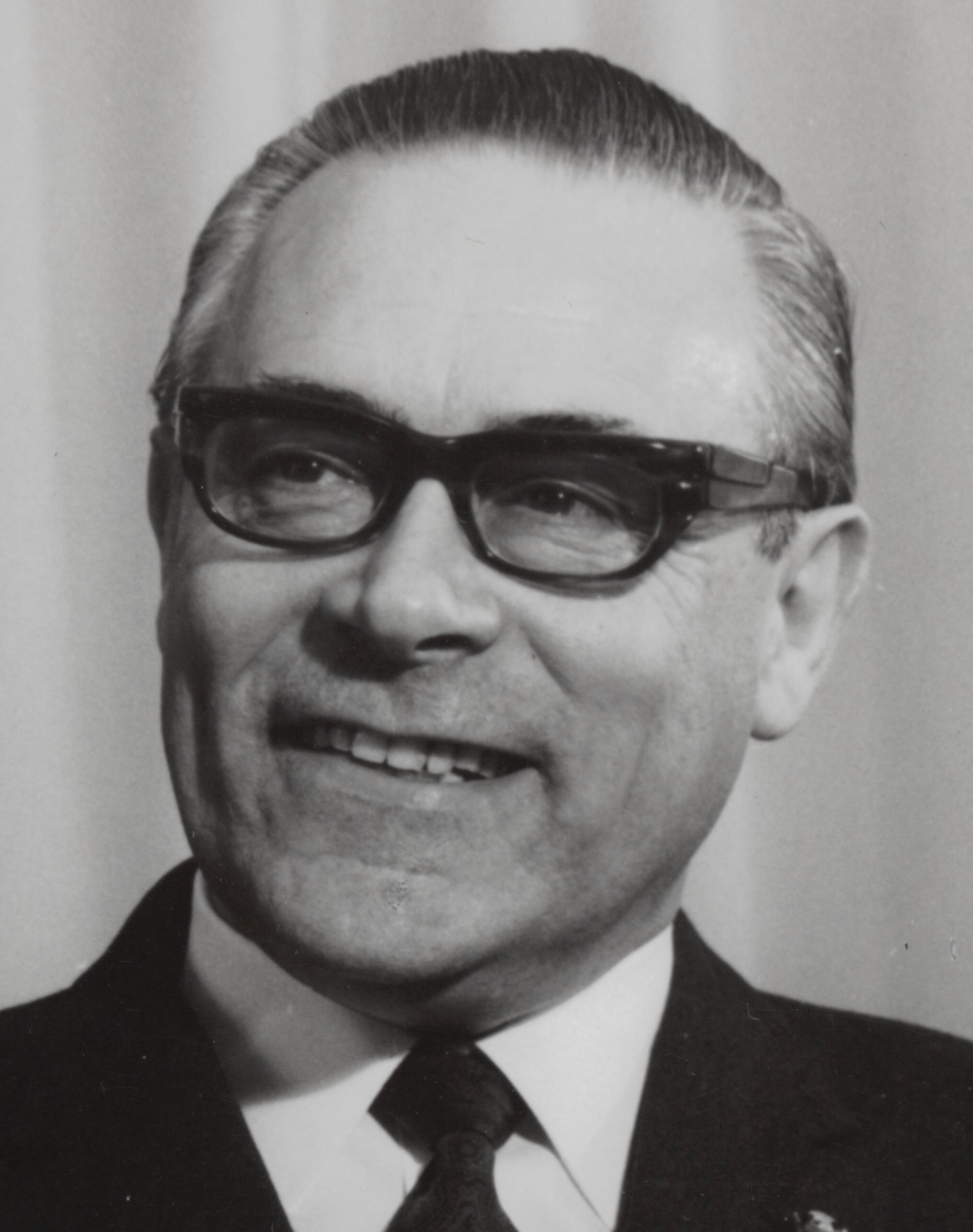
- Witte in 1966

Minister of Housing and Spatial Planning
- In office 22 November 1966 – 5 April 1967
- Prime Minister: Jelle Zijlstra
- Preceded by: Pieter Bogaers
- Succeeded by: Wim Schut

Mayor of Eindhoven
- In office 5 April 1967 – 30 May 1973
- Preceded by: Jan van Stuijvenberg (Ad interim)
- Succeeded by: Jaap van der Lee
- In office 16 October 1959 – 22 November 1966
- Preceded by: Charles van Rooy
- Succeeded by: Jan van Stuijvenberg (Ad interim)

Member of the House of Representatives
- In office 20 March 1959 – 16 October 1959
- Parliamentary group: Catholic People's Party

Minister of Transport and Water Management
- In office 10 October 1958 – 1 November 1958; Ad interim
- Prime Minister: Willem Drees
- Preceded by: Jacob Algera
- Succeeded by: Jan van Aartsen

Minister of Housing and Construction
- In office 13 October 1956 – 19 May 1959
- Prime Minister: Willem Drees (1956–1958); Louis Beel (1958–1959)
- Preceded by: Himself as Minister of Reconstruction and Housing
- Succeeded by: Jan van Aartsen

Minister of Reconstruction and Housing
- In office 2 September 1952 – 13 October 1956
- Prime Minister: Willem Drees
- Preceded by: Joris in 't Veld
- Succeeded by: Himself as Minister of Housing and Construction

Mayor of Bergen op Zoom
- In office 1 May 1945 – 2 September 1952
- Preceded by: Henk Lijnkamp
- Succeeded by: Leonard Peters

Personal details
- Born: Herman Bernard Jan Witte; 18 August 1909 Harlingen, Netherlands
- Died: 30 May 1973 (aged 63) Eindhoven, Netherlands
- Cause of death: Brain tumor
- Party: Catholic People's Party (from 1945)
- Other political affiliations: Roman Catholic; State Party (until 1945)
- Spouse: Angelina Wüst (m. 1939)
- Children: 4 sons and 2 daughters
- Education: Delft Institute of Technology (Bachelor of Engineering, Master of Engineering)
- Occupation: Politician · Civil servant · Civil engineer · Corporate director · Nonprofit director · Academic administrator

Military service
- Allegiance: Netherlands
- Branch/service: Royal Netherlands Army
- Years of service: 1933–1939 (Reserve); 1939–1940 (Active duty)
- Rank: Second lieutenant
- Unit: National Reserve Corps
- Battles/wars: World War II; Battle of the Netherlands; Battle of Zeeland; Battle of France

Herman Bernard Jan Witte (18 August 1909 – 30 May 1973) was a Dutch politician of the defunct Catholic People's Party (KVP) now merged into the Christian Democratic Appeal (CDA) party and civil engineer.

== Biography ==
Witte applied at the Delft Institute of Technology in June 1927 majoring in civil engineering and obtaining a Bachelor of Engineering degree before graduating with a Master of Engineering degree in July 1933. Witte worked as a civil servant for the Ministry of Water Management as a civil engineer at Rijkswaterstaat from July 1933 until August 1939 and as a civil servant for municipality of Bergen op Zoom as director of Public Works from August 1939 until June 1940. Witte also served in the military reserve force of the Royal Netherlands Army and was mobilized on in April 1940 before Nazi Germany invaded the Netherlands. Witte was captured following the Battle of Zeeland and was detained from May 1940 until August 1940. During the German occupation Witte was associated with members of the Dutch resistance. Following the end of World War II Queen Wilhelmina Witte was appointed as acting Mayor of Bergen op Zoom, taking office on 1 May 1945. One year later on 1 May 1946 he was made permanent Mayor. After the election of 1952 Witte was appointed as Minister of Reconstruction and Housing in the Cabinet Drees II, taking office on 2 September 1952. After the election of 1956 Witte continued in the post as the newly renamed Minister of Housing and Construction in the Cabinet Drees III, taking office on 13 October 1956. Witte served as acting Minister of Transport and Water Management from 10 October 1958 until 1 November 1958 following the resignation of Jacob Algera.

The Cabinet Drees III fell on 11 December 1958 and continued to serve in a demissionary capacity until it was replaced by the caretaker Cabinet Beel II with Witte continuing as Minister of Housing and Construction, taking office on 22 December 1958. Witte was elected as a Member of the House of Representatives after the election of 1959, taking office on 20 March 1959. Following the cabinet formation of 1959 Witte was not giving a cabinet post in the new cabinet, the Cabinet Beel II was replaced by the Cabinet De Quay on 19 May 1959 and he continued to serve in the House of Representatives as a frontbencher. In September 1959 Witte was nominated as Mayor of Eindhoven, he resigned as a Member of the House of Representatives the day he was installed as Mayor, taking office on 16 October 1959. On 14 October 1966 the Cabinet Cals fell and continued to serve in a demissionary capacity until it was replaced by the caretaker Cabinet Zijlstra with Witte taking a leave of absence as Mayor and was again appointed as Minister of Housing and Spatial Planning, taking office on 22 November 1966. Witte who had previously announced that he was only willing to serve in the caretaker Cabinet Zijlstra didn't stand for the election of 1967, the Cabinet Zijlstra was replaced by the Cabinet De Jong on 5 April 1967 and he returned as Mayor of Eindhoven the same day, serving from 5 April 1967 until 30 May 1973.

== Decorations ==
Honours
Ribbon bar	Honour	Country	Date	Comment
	Knight of the Order of the Holy Sepulchre	Holy See	4 October 1954	
	Commander of the Order of Leopold II	Belgium	30 September 1955	
	Knight Grand Cross of the Order of Orange-Nassau	Netherlands	27 April 1967	Elevated from Grand Officer (9 June 1959)
	Knight of the Order of the Netherlands Lion	Netherlands	30 May 1973	

Political offices
Preceded by Henk Lijnkamp	Mayor of Bergen op Zoom; 1945–1952	Succeeded by Leonard Peters
Preceded by Joris in 't Veld	Minister of Reconstruction and Housing; 1952–1956	Succeeded by Himself as Minister of Housing and Construction
Preceded by Himself as Minister of Reconstruction and Housing	Minister of Housing and Construction; 1956–1959	Succeeded by Jan van Aartsen
Preceded by Jacob Algera	Minister of Transport and Water Management; Ad interim 1958	Succeeded by Jan van Aartsen
Preceded by Charles van Rooy	Mayor of Eindhoven; 1959–1966; 1967–1973	Succeeded by Jan van Stuijvenberg; Ad interim
Preceded by Jan van Stuijvenberg; Ad interim	Mayor of Eindhoven; 1959–1966; 1967–1973	Succeeded by Jaap van der Lee
Preceded by Pieter Bogaers	Minister of Housing and Spatial Planning; 1966–1967	Succeeded by Wim Schut
