= Jan van Aartsen =

Dutch politician (1909–1992)

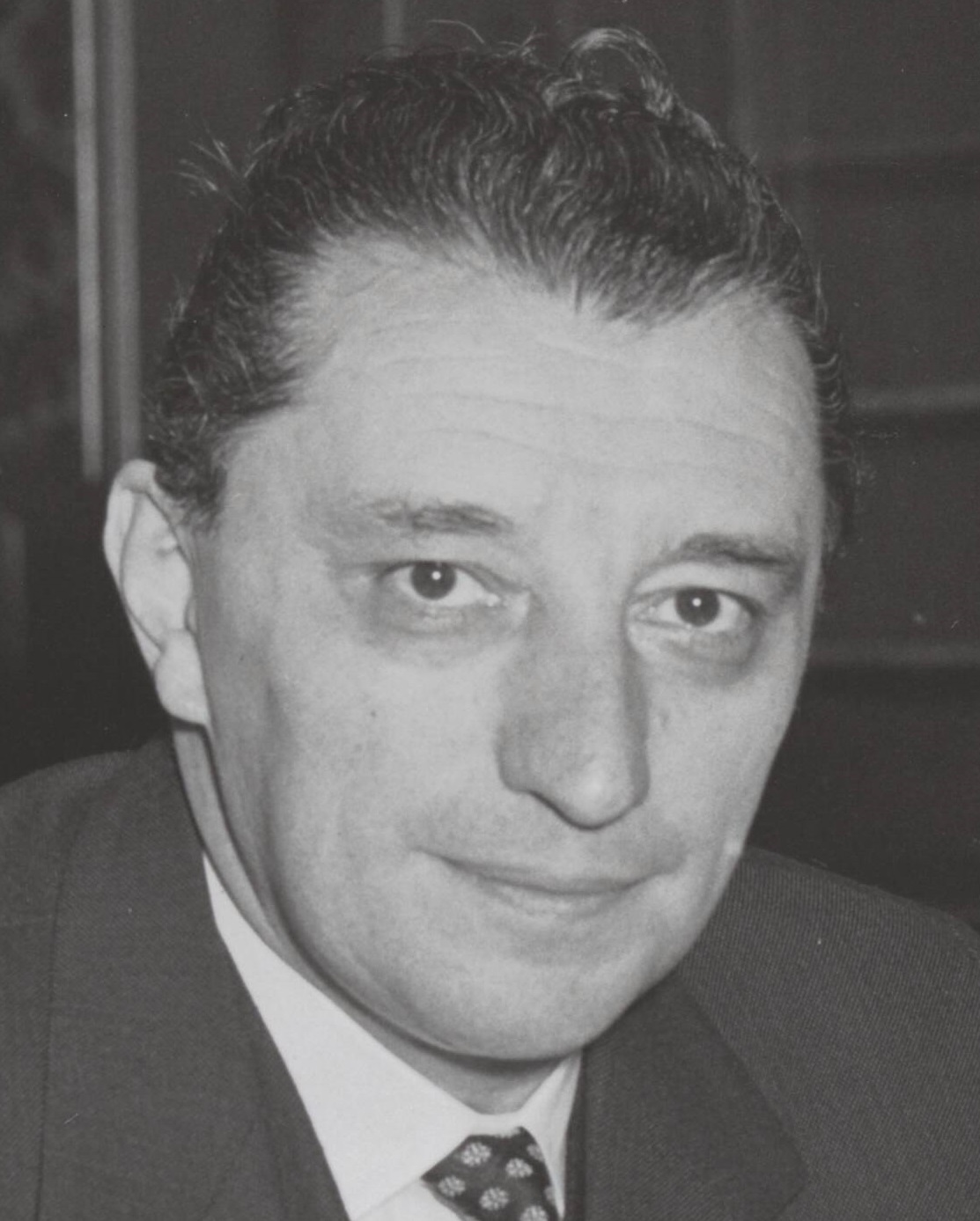
- Van Aartsen in 1958

Queen's Commissioner of Zeeland
- In office 1 June 1965 – 1 October 1974
- Monarch: Juliana
- Preceded by: Guus de Casembroot
- Succeeded by: Kees Boertien

Minister of Housing and Construction
- In office 19 May 1959 – 24 July 1963
- Prime Minister: Jan de Quay
- Preceded by: Herman Witte
- Succeeded by: Pieter Bogaers

Member of the House of Representatives
- In office 20 March 1959 – 19 May 1959

Minister of Transport and Water Management
- In office 24 July 1963 – 14 April 1965
- Prime Minister: Victor Marijnen
- Preceded by: Henk Korthals
- Succeeded by: Ko Suurhoff
- In office 1 November 1958 – 19 May 1959
- Prime Minister: Willem Drees (1958); Louis Beel (1958–1959)
- Preceded by: Herman Witte (ad interim)
- Succeeded by: Henk Korthals

Personal details
- Born: Johannes van Aartsen; 15 September 1909 Amsterdam, Netherlands
- Died: 3 February 1992 (aged 82) Vlissingen, Netherlands
- Party: Christian Democratic Appeal (from 1980)
- Other political affiliations: Anti-Revolutionary Party (until 1980)
- Spouse: Klaasje Stap (m. 1946)
- Children: Jozias van Aartsen (born 1947)
- Education: Free University Amsterdam (Bachelor of Laws, Master of Laws)
- Occupation: Politician · Civil servant · Jurist · Lawyer · Trade association executive

Johannes "Jan" van Aartsen (Dutch pronunciation: [joːˈɦɑnə ˈɕɑɱ vɑn ˈaːrtsə(n)]; (Note: In isolation, the words are pronounced [joːˈɦɑnəs], [ˈjɑn], [vɑn] and [ˈaːrtsə(n)].) 15 September 1909 – 3 February 1992) was a Dutch jurist and politician of the Anti-Revolutionary Party (ARP).

Van Aartsen was a lawyer in The Hague. He became minister of Transportation and Water Management in November 1958, at the end of the fourth Drees cabinet. From 1959 to 1963, he served as minister of Housing and the Construction Industry in the De Quay cabinet. Under De Quay's successor Victor Marijnen, Van Aartsen returned to the post of Transportation and Water Management. In 1965, Van Aartsen was appointed Queen's Commissioner of the province of Zeeland, where he would remain until 1974.

== Career ==
Van Aartsen applied at the Free University Amsterdam in June 1931 majoring in law and obtaining a Bachelor of Laws degree before graduating with a Master of Laws degree in July 1936. Van Aartsen worked as a lawyer in The Hague from August 1936 until October 1944. On 10 May 1940 Nazi Germany invaded the Netherlands and the government fled to London to escape the German occupation. During World War II, Van Aartsen continued to work as a lawyer. He worked as a trade association executive for the Christian Employers' association (NCW) from October 1944 until September 1949 and served as General-Secretary from July 1947 until September 1949. Van Aartsen also served on the Municipal Council of The Hague from May 1948 until November 1958 and served as an Alderman in The Hague from September 1949 until November 1958.

Van Aartsen was appointed as Minister of Transport and Water Management in the Drees III cabinet following the resignation of Jacob Algera, taking office on 1 November 1958. The Drees III cabinet fell on 11 December 1958 and continued to serve in a demissionary capacity until it was replaced by the caretaker Beel II cabinet with Van Aartsen continuing as Minister of Transport and Water Management, taking office on 22 December 1958. Van Aartsen was elected to the House of Representatives in the 1959 general election, taking office on 20 March 1959. Following the cabinet formation of 1959, Van Aartsen was appointed as Minister of Housing and Construction in the De Quay cabinet, taking office on 19 May 1959. In December 1962 Van Aartsen announced that he would not stand for the 1963 general election. Following the cabinet formation of 1963, Van Aartsen was again appointed as Minister of Transport and Water Management in the Marijnen cabinet, taking office on 24 July 1963. The Marijnen cabinet fell on 27 February 1965 and continued to serve in a demissionary capacity until the cabinet formation of 1965, Van Aartsen was not giving a cabinet post in the new Cals cabinet, which took office on 14 April 1965.

Van Aartsen remained in active politics, in May 1965 Van Aartsen was nominated as Queen's Commissioner of Zeeland, serving from 1 June 1965 until 1 October 1974.

== Personal life ==
Van Aartsen was the father of Jozias van Aartsen, who became foreign minister of the Netherlands in 1998. He died at age 82 in 1992 and is buried at Zorgvlied cemetery.

== Decorations ==
Honours
Ribbon bar	Honour	Country	Date	Comment
	Commander of the Order of Leopold II	Belgium	12 July 1962	
	Officer of the Legion of Honour	France	14 August 1964	
	Grand Officer of the Order of Orange-Nassau	Netherlands	20 April 1965	
	Commander of the Order of the Netherlands Lion	Netherlands	1 October 1974	

== Notes ==
Political offices
Preceded by Herman Witte; Ad interim	Minister of Transport and Water Management; 1958–1959	Succeeded by Henk Korthals
Preceded by Herman Witte	Minister of Housing and Construction; 1959–1963	Succeeded by Pieter Bogaers
Preceded by Henk Korthals	Minister of Transport and Water Management; 1963–1965	Succeeded by Ko Suurhoff
Preceded by Guus de Casembroot	Queen's Commissioner of Zeeland; 1965–1974	Succeeded by Kees Boertien
