= Henk Korthals =

Dutch politician (1911–1976)

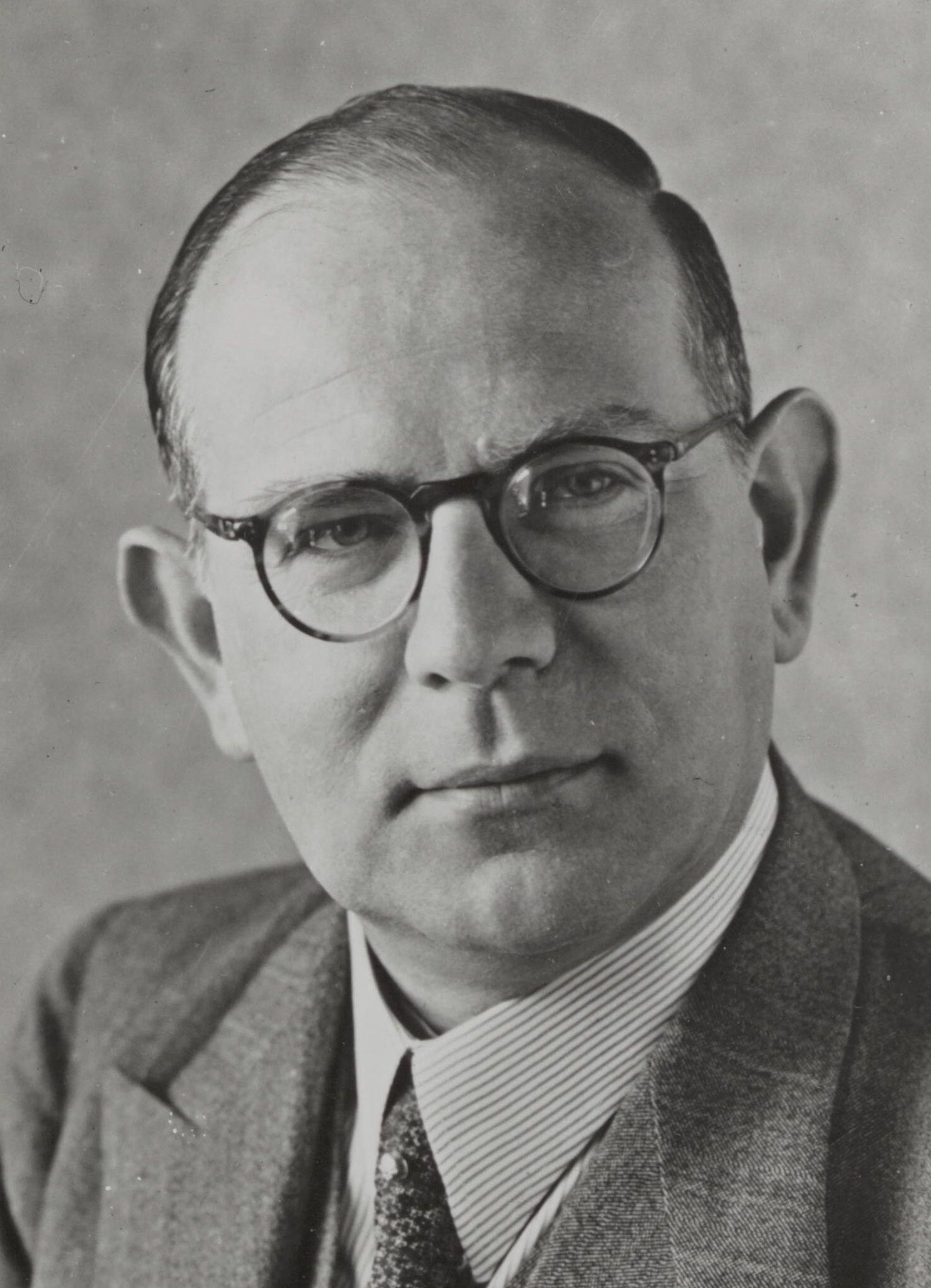
- Korthals in 1959

Member of the Council of State
- In office 1 April 1964 – 3 November 1976
- Vice President: Louis Beel (1964–1972); Marinus Ruppert (1972–1976)

Deputy Prime Minister
- In office 19 May 1959 – 24 July 1963
- Prime Minister: Jan de Quay
- Preceded by: Teun Struycken
- Succeeded by: Barend Biesheuvel

Minister of Transport and Water Management
- In office 19 May 1959 – 24 July 1963
- Prime Minister: Jan de Quay
- Preceded by: Jan van Aartsen
- Succeeded by: Jan van Aartsen

Minister for Suriname and Netherlands Antilles Affairs
- In office 1 September 1959 – 24 July 1963
- Prime Minister: Jan de Quay
- Preceded by: Himself as Minister for Overseas Affairs
- Succeeded by: Barend Biesheuvel

Minister for Overseas Affairs
- In office 19 May 1959 – 1 September 1959
- Prime Minister: Jan de Quay
- Preceded by: Gerard Helders as Minister of Colonial Affairs
- Succeeded by: Himself as Minister for Suriname and Netherlands Antilles Affairs

Delegation leader in the European Parliament
- In office 1 January 1958 – 19 May 1959
- Preceded by: Office established
- Succeeded by: Bob de Wilde
- Parliamentary group: People's Party for Freedom and Democracy

Member of the European Parliament
- In office 1 January 1958 – 19 May 1959
- Parliamentary group: Group of Liberals and Allies
- Constituency: Netherlands

Member of the European Coal and Steel Community Parliament
- In office 10 September 1952 – 1 January 1958
- Parliamentary group: Group of Liberals and Allies
- Constituency: Netherlands

Member of the House of Representatives
- In office 20 November 1945 – 19 May 1959
- Parliamentary group: People's Party for Freedom and Democracy (1948–1959); Freedom Party (1946–1948); Liberal State Party (1945–1946)

Personal details
- Born: Hendrik Albertus Korthals; 3 July 1911 Dordrecht, Netherlands
- Died: 3 November 1976 (aged 65) Tarrytown, New York, United States
- Party: People's Party for Freedom and Democracy (from 1948)
- Other political affiliations: Freedom Party (1946–1948); Liberal State Party (1924–1946)
- Spouse: Marie Cécile Hamming (m. 1940)
- Children: Benk Korthals (born 1944); 2 daughters and 1 other son
- Education: Rotterdam School of Economics (Bachelor of Economics, Master of Economics)
- Occupation: Politician · Civil servant · Journalist · Editor · Author · Nonprofit director

Hendrik Albertus "Henk" Korthals (3 July 1911 – 3 November 1976) was a Dutch politician of the defunct Liberal State Party (LSP) later the Freedom Party (PvdV) and later co-founder of the People's Party for Freedom and Democracy (VVD) and journalist.

Korthals attended a Gymnasium in Dordrecht from May 1923 until June 1929 and applied at the Rotterdam School of Economics in June 1929 majoring in Economics obtaining a Bachelor of Economics degree in June 1931 before graduating with a Master of Economics degree on 12 May 1936. Korthals worked as a journalist for the Nieuwe Rotterdamsche Courant from May 1936 until October 1940 and as civil servant for the department of General Economic Policy of the Ministry of Commerce, Industry and Shipping from October 1940 until November 1945. On 10 May 1940 Nazi Germany invaded the Netherlands and the government fled to London to escape the German occupation. Korthals was sympathetic with the Dutch resistance against the German occupiers and worked as a journalist and editor for the underground newspaper Het Dagelijks Nieuws from July 1940 until May 1945. Korthals worked as editor for the NRC Handelsblad from May 1945 until November 1945.

Following the end of World War II Queen Wilhelmina ordered a Recall of Parliament and Korthals was appointment as a Member of the House of Representatives taking the place of the deceased Isidoor Henry Joseph Vos, taking office on 20 November 1945 serving as a frontbencher and the de facto Whip and spokesperson for Economic Affairs, Defence, European Affairs, NATO and deputy spokesperson for Foreign Affairs and Benelux Union. On 24 January 1948 the Freedom Party (PvdV) and the Committee-Oud choose to merge to form the People's Party for Freedom and Democracy (VVD). Korthals was one of the co-founders and became unofficial Deputy Leader of the People's Party for Freedom and Democracy on 10 July 1952. Korthals also served as editor-in-chief of the party newspaper Vrijheid en Democratie from 4 April 1948 until 1 January 1954. Korthals was selected as a Member of the European Coal and Steel Community Parliament and dual served in those positions, taking office on 10 September 1952. Korthals was selected as a first Member of the European Parliament and as the Delegation leader and dual served in those positions, taking office on 1 January 1958.

After the election of 1959 Korthals was appointed as Deputy Prime Minister, Minister of Transport and Water Management and Minister for Overseas Affairs in the Cabinet De Quay, taking office on 19 May 1959. On 1 September 1959 the Minister for Overseas Affairs was renamed as the Minister for Suriname and Netherlands Antilles Affairs. After the Leader of the People's Party for Freedom and Democracy and Parliamentary leader of the People's Party for Freedom and Democracy in the House of Representatives Pieter Oud announced his retirement from national politics and that he wouldn't stand for the election of 1963, he approached Korthals as a candidate to succeed him, but the People's Party for Freedom and Democracy leadership favored Minister of the Interior Edzo Toxopeus, in response Korthals withdrew his name for consideration and Toxopeus became the new Leader. In February 1963 Korthals announced that he wouldn't stand for the election of 1963. Following the cabinet formation of 1963 Korthals was not giving a cabinet post in the new cabinet, the Cabinet De Quay was replaced by the Cabinet Marijnen on 24 July 1963. Korthals remained in active in national politics, in March 1964 he was nominated as a Member of the Council of State, taking office on 1 April 1964. Korthals also became active in the public sector and occupied numerous seats as a nonprofit director on several boards of directors and supervisory boards (Veilig Verkeer Nederland, Radio Netherlands Worldwide, Oxfam Novib and the International Institute of Social History) and served on several state commissions and councils on behalf of the government (Raad voor Cultuur, Cadastre Agency and the Dutch Transport Safety Board). On 3 November 1976 Korthals died unexpectedly during a visit to the United States at the age of 65.

== Decorations ==
Honours
Ribbon bar	Honour	Country	Date	Comment
	Knight of the Order of the Netherlands Lion	Netherlands	31 August 1955	
	Knight Commander of the Order of Merit	Germany	10 December 1959	
	Grand Cross of the Order of the Crown	Belgium	15 March 1960	
	Grand Officer of the Legion of Honour	France	12 February 1961	
	Grand Officer of the Order of the Oak Crown	Luxembourg	1 May 1963	
	Grand Officer of the Order of Orange-Nassau	Netherlands	27 July 1963	
	Grand Cross of the Honorary Order of the Yellow Star	Suriname	25 November 1975	

Party political offices
Preceded by Dirk Stikker	Deputy Leader of the People's Party for Freedom and Democracy; 1952–1963	Succeeded by Molly Geertsema
Preceded by Office established	Delegation leader of the People's Party for Freedom and Democracy in the European Parliament; 1958–1959	Succeeded by Bob de Wilde
Political offices
Preceded by Teun Struycken	Deputy Prime Minister; 1959–1963	Succeeded by Barend Biesheuvel
Preceded by Jan van Aartsen	Minister of Transport and Water Management; 1959–1963	Succeeded by Jan van Aartsen
Preceded by Gerard Helders as Minister of Colonial Affairs	Minister for Overseas Affairs; 1959	Succeeded by Himself as Minister for Suriname and Netherlands Antilles Affairs
Preceded by Himself as Minister for Overseas Affairs	Minister for Suriname and Netherlands Antilles Affairs; 1959–1963	Succeeded by Barend Biesheuvel
Honorary titles
Preceded by Office established	Honorary Chairman of the Youth Organisation Freedom and Democracy; 1974–1976	Succeeded by Hans Wiegel; 1999
