= Kees Boertien =

Dutch politician (1927–2002)

His Excellency Kees Boertien
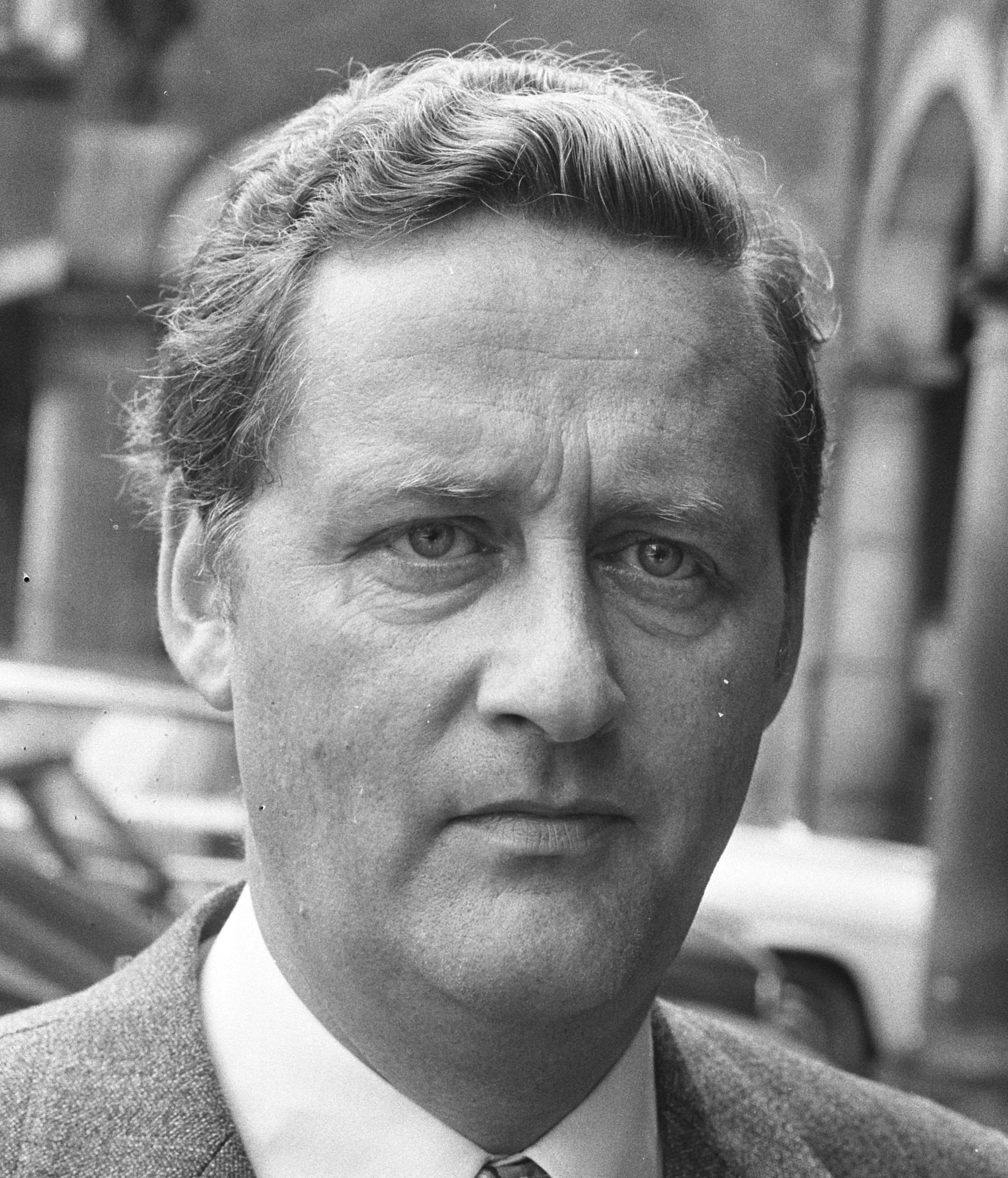
- Kees Boertien in 1971

Queen's Commissioner of Zeeland
- In office 16 January 1975 – 1 August 1992
- Monarchs: Juliana (1975–1980); Beatrix (1980–1992)
- Preceded by: Jan van Aartsen
- Succeeded by: Wim van Gelder

Minister for Development Cooperation
- In office 6 July 1971 – 11 May 1973
- Prime Minister: Barend Biesheuvel
- Preceded by: Bé Udink as Minister for Aid to Developing Countries
- Succeeded by: Jan Pronk

Member of the European Parliament
- In office 8 May 1967 – 6 July 1971
- Parliamentary group: Christian Democratic Group
- Constituency: Netherlands

Member of the House of Representatives
- In office 28 May 1973 – 16 January 1975
- In office 7 December 1972 – 7 March 1973
- In office 18 May 1965 – 6 July 1971
- Parliamentary group: Anti-Revolutionary Party

Personal details
- Born: Cornelis Boertien; 26 July 1927 Enschede, Netherlands
- Died: 30 May 2002 (aged 74) Vlissingen, Netherlands
- Party: Christian Democratic Appeal (from 1980)
- Other political affiliations: Anti-Revolutionary Party (until 1980)
- Spouse: Johanna Velema (m. 1954)
- Children: 3 children
- Education: Utrecht University (Bachelor of Laws, Master of Laws); Free University Amsterdam (Doctor of Law)
- Occupation: Politician · Civil servant · Jurist · Researcher · Accountant · Management consultant · Corporate director · Nonprofit director

Cornelis "Kees" Boertien (26 July 1927 – 30 May 2002) was a Dutch politician of the defunct Anti-Revolutionary Party (ARP) and later the Christian Democratic Appeal (CDA) party and jurist.

Boertien attended a Gymnasium in Zwolle from April 1939 until May 1946 and applied at the Utrecht University in June 1946 majoring in Law and obtaining a Bachelor of Laws degree in July 1948 and worked as student researcher before graduating with a Master of Laws degree on 13 December 1952. Boertien worked as an office clerk for a printing office in Zwolle from June 1946 until August 1947 and for an insurance company in Utrecht from August 1947 until December 1952. Boertien worked as an accountant for the Nederlands Instituut van Registeraccountants from December 1952 until September 1960. Boertien worked as a paralegal for Philips in Eindhoven from September 1960 until October 1965. Boertien applied at the Free University Amsterdam in July 1958 for a postgraduate education in Law and worked as a researcher at the Free University Amsterdam before he got a doctorate as a Doctor of Law on 13 April 1962. Boertien served on the Anti-Revolutionary Party Executive Board from February 1960 until May 1965.

Boertien became a Member of the House of Representatives after Jan Smallenbroek was appointed as Minister of the Interior in the Cabinet Cals following the cabinet formation of 1965, taking office on 18 May 1965 serving as a frontbencher and spokesperson for Justice, Law enforcement, Transport, Postal Services, Medical Ethics, Gambling and deputy spokesperson for Social Affairs and the Royal Family. Boertien was selected as a Member of the European Parliament and dual served in those positions, taking office on 8 May 1967. After the election of 1971 Boertien was appointed as Minister for Development Cooperation in the Cabinet Biesheuvel I, taking office on 14 July 1971. The Cabinet Biesheuvel I fell just one year later on 19 July 1972 after the Democratic Socialists '70 (DS'70) retracted their support following there dissatisfaction with the proposed budget memorandum to further reduce the deficit and continued to serve in a demissionary capacity until the first cabinet formation of 1972 when it was replaced by the caretaker Cabinet Biesheuvel II with Boertien continuing as Minister for Development Cooperation, taking office on 9 August 1972. After the election of 1972 Boertien returned as a Member of the House of Representatives, taking office on 7 December 1972 but he was still serving in the cabinet and because of dualism customs in the constitutional convention of Dutch politics he couldn't serve a dual mandate he subsequently resigned as a Member of the House of Representatives on 7 March 1973. Following the second cabinet formation of 1972 Boertien was not giving a cabinet post in the new cabinet, the Cabinet Biesheuvel II was replaced by the Cabinet Den Uyl on 11 May 1973. Boertien subsequently returned as a Member of the House of Representatives after Antoon Veerman was appointment as State Secretary for Education and Sciences in the new cabinet, taking office on 28 May 1973 serving as a frontbencher chairing the parliamentary committee for Kingdom Relations and the special parliamentary committee for European Parliamentary Reforms and spokesperson for Foreign Affairs, Defence, European Affairs, Benelux Union and deputy spokesperson for Medical Ethics and Abortion.

In December 1974 Boertien was nominated as Queen's Commissioner of Zeeland, he resigned as Member of the House of Representatives the same day he was installed as Queen's Commissioner, serving from 16 January 1975 until 1 August 1992. Boertien also became active in the private sector and public sector and occupied numerous seats as a corporate director and nonprofit director on several boards of directors and supervisory boards and served on several state commissions and councils on behalf of the government (Advisory Council for Spatial Planning, Raad voor Cultuur, Cadastre Agency and the Public Pension Funds PFZW).

== Decorations ==
Honours
Ribbon bar	Honour	Country	Date
	Knight of the Order of the Netherlands Lion	Netherlands	8 June 1973
	Grand Officer of the Order of Orange-Nassau	Netherlands	1 August 1992

Political offices
Preceded by Bé Udink as Minister for Aid to Developing Countries	Minister for Development; Cooperation; 1971–1973	Succeeded by Jan Pronk
Preceded by Jan van Aartsen	Queen's Commissioner of Zeeland; 1975–1992	Succeeded by Wim van Gelder
