= Julius Christiaan van Oven =

Dutch jurist and politician

His Excellency Julius Christiaan van Oven
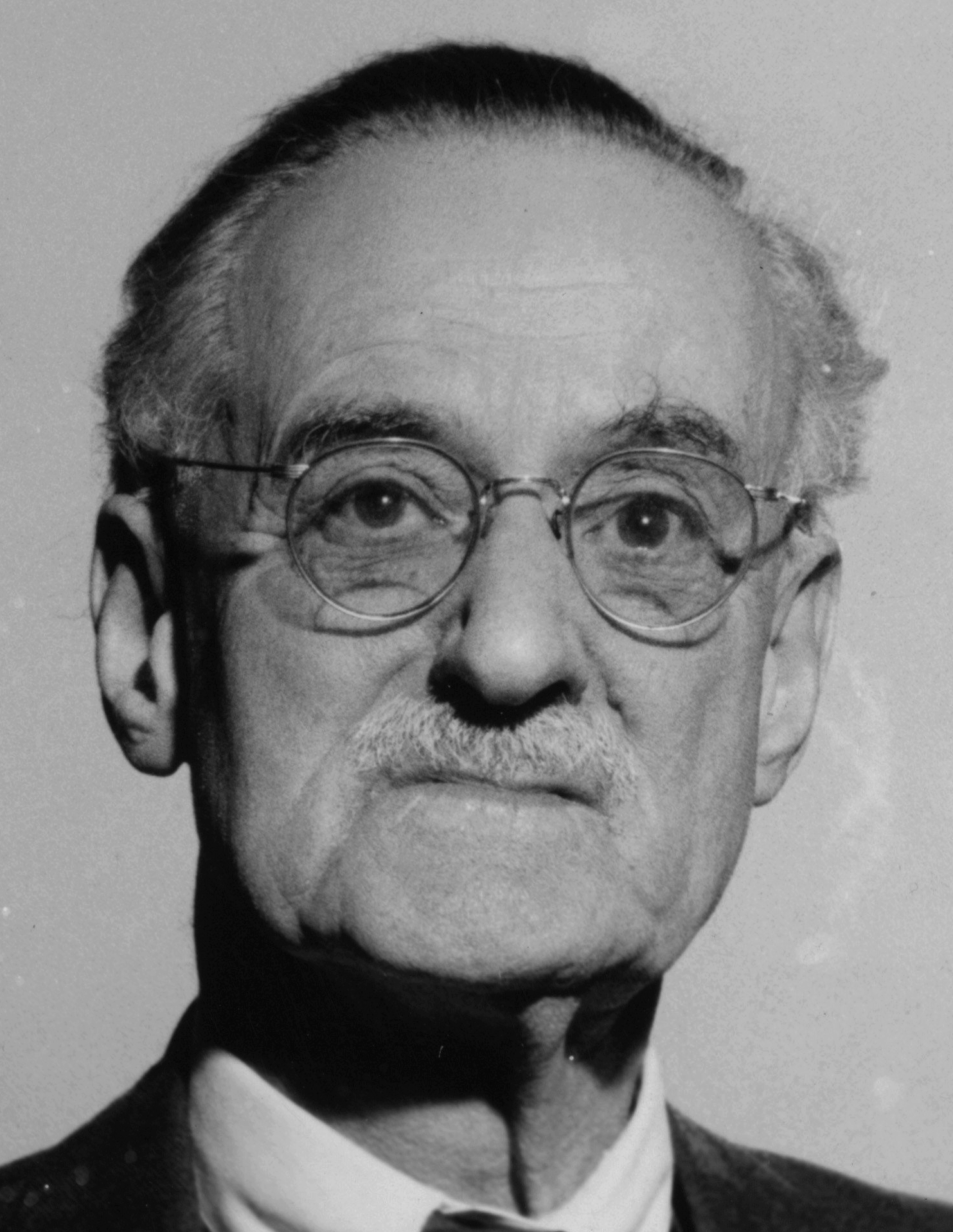
- Julius Christiaan van Oven in 1956

Minister of the Interior
- In office 7 July 1956 – 13 October 1956; Ad interim
- Prime Minister: Willem Drees
- Preceded by: Louis Beel
- Succeeded by: Ko Suurhoff (Ad interim)

Minister of Justice
- In office 15 February 1956 – 13 October 1956
- Prime Minister: Willem Drees
- Preceded by: Louis Beel (Ad interim)
- Succeeded by: Ivo Samkalden

Personal details
- Born: Julius Christiaan van Oven; 17 November 1881 Dordrecht, Netherlands
- Died: 16 March 1963 (aged 81) Leiden, Netherlands
- Party: Labour Party (from 1946)
- Other political affiliations: Free-thinking; Democratic League (until 1946)
- Spouse: Maria van Doorn (m. 1909; died 1957)
- Children: 3 sons and 2 daughters
- Education: University of Amsterdam (Bachelor of Laws, Master of Laws, Doctor of Philosophy)
- Occupation: Politician · Jurist · Lawyer · Researcher · Historian · Author · Editor · Academic administrator · Professor

Julius Christiaan van Oven (17 November 1881 – 16 March 1963) was a Dutch jurist and politician of the Labour Party (PvdA).

For 34 years, Van Oven was professor of Roman law, from 1917 to 1925 at the University of Groningen and from 1925 to 1951 at Leiden University. In 1948 he was elected a member of the Royal Netherlands Academy of Arts and Sciences. At the age of 74, he was asked to succeed Leendert Antonie Donker, who died in office in February 1956, as Minister of Justice in the Third Drees cabinet. During the 8 months he was in office, he managed to establish a law he had been advocating for since 1927: this Lex-Van Oven law finally annulled the legal incapacity of married women, including the prohibition for them to hold office.

== Decorations ==
Honours
Ribbon bar	Honour	Country	Date	Comment
	Knight of the Order of the Netherlands Lion	Netherlands	15 May 1952	
	Commander of the Order of Orange-Nassau	Netherlands	3 November 1956	

Political offices
Preceded by Louis Beel	Minister of Justice; 1956	Succeeded by Ivo Samkalden
Preceded by Louis Beel	Minister of the Interior; Ad interim 1956	Succeeded by Ko Suurhoff; Ad interim
Academic offices
Preceded by Rudolph Cleveringa	Rector Magnificus of the Leiden University; 1947–1948	Succeeded by Cornelis Berg
