= Pieter Bogaers =

Dutch politician (1924–2008)

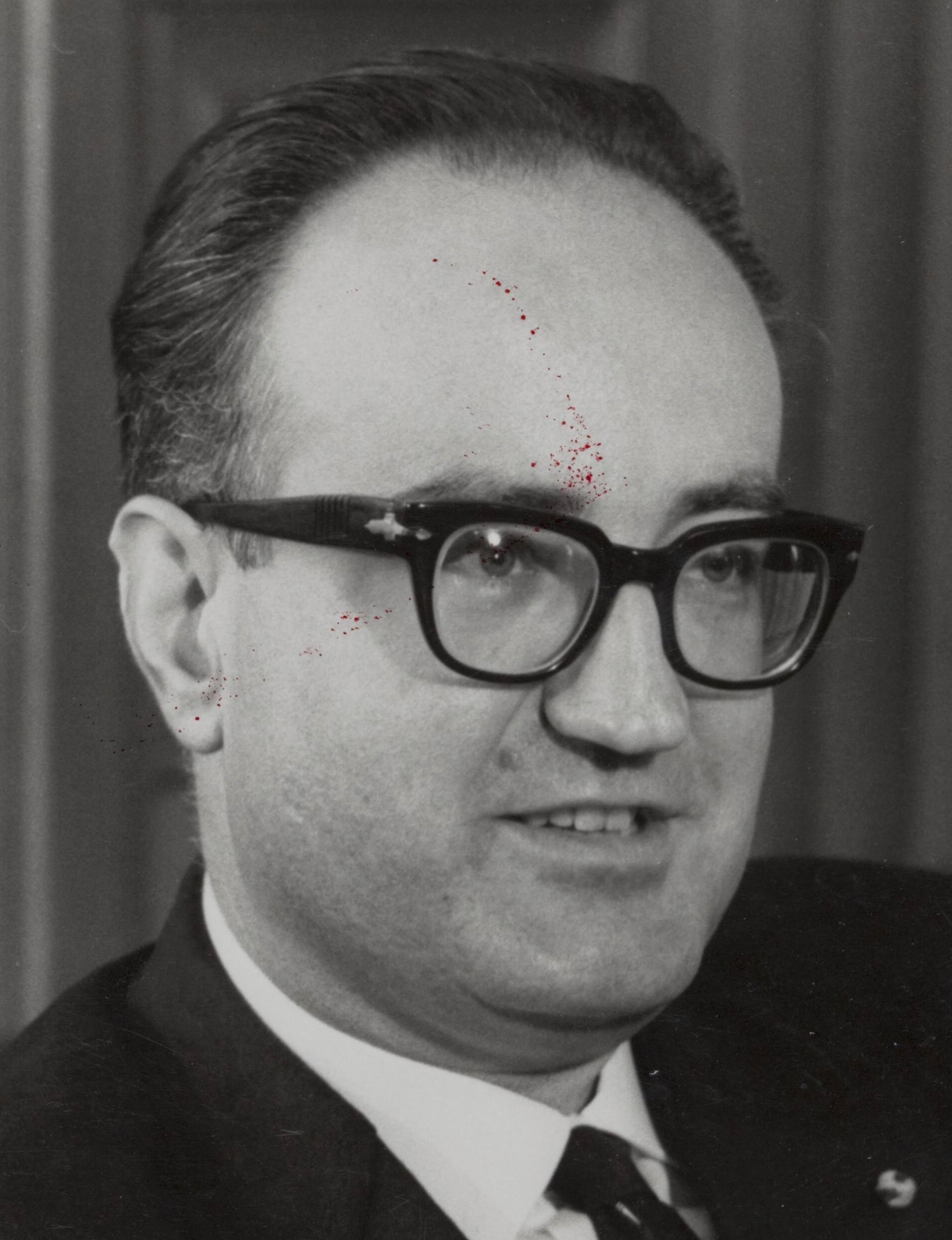
- Bogaers in 1963

Chairman of the Political Party of Radicals
- In office 27 April 1968 – 1 August 1969
- Leader: Jacques Aarden
- Preceded by: Office established
- Succeeded by: Erik Jurgens

Minister of Transport and Water Management
- In office 1 May 1966 – 30 June 1966; Ad interim
- Prime Minister: Jo Cals
- Preceded by: Ko Suurhoff
- Succeeded by: Ko Suurhoff

Minister of Housing and Spatial Planning
- In office 14 April 1965 – 22 November 1966
- Prime Minister: Jo Cals
- Preceded by: Himself as Minister of Housing and Construction
- Succeeded by: Herman Witte

Minister of Housing and Construction
- In office 24 July 1963 – 14 April 1965
- Prime Minister: Victor Marijnen
- Preceded by: Jan van Aartsen
- Succeeded by: Himself as Minister of Housing and Spatial Planning

Member of the House of Representatives
- In office 20 March 1959 – 24 July 1963

Personal details
- Born: Petrus Clemens Wilhelmus Maria Bogaers; 2 July 1924 Cuijk, Netherlands
- Died: 5 July 2008 (aged 84) Amersfoort, Netherlands
- Party: Christian Democratic Appeal (from 1980)
- Other political affiliations: Political Party of Radicals (1968–1970); Catholic People's Party (1948–1968, 1970–1980)
- Spouses: Femmigje Visscher (m. 1950; div. 1980) Ida Heyne (m. 1981)
- Children: 4 sons and 3 daughters (first marriage)
- Education: Tilburg University (Bachelor of Economics, Master of Economics)
- Occupation: Politician · Civil servant · Economist · Researcher · Corporate director · Nonprofit director · Author

Petrus Clemens Wilhelmus Maria "Pieter" Bogaers (2 July 1924 – 5 July 200i) was a Dutch politician of the Catholic People's Party (KVP) and later co-founder of the Political Party of Radicals (PPR).

== Decorations ==
Honours
Ribbon bar	Honour	Country	Date	Comment
	Commander of the Order of Orange-Nassau	Netherlands	5 December 1966	Elevated from Officer (20 April 1965)

Party political offices
New political party	Chairman of the Political; Party of Radicals; 1968–1969	Succeeded by Erik Jurgens
Political offices
Preceded by Jan van Aartsen	Minister of Housing and Construction; 1963–1965	Succeeded by Himself as Minister of Housing and Spatial Planning
Preceded by Himself as Minister of Housing and Construction	Minister of Housing and Spatial Planning; 1965–1966	Succeeded by Herman Witte
Preceded by Ko Suurhoff	Minister of Transport and Water Management; Ad interim 1966	Succeeded by Ko Suurhoff
