= Ko Suurhoff =

Dutch politician

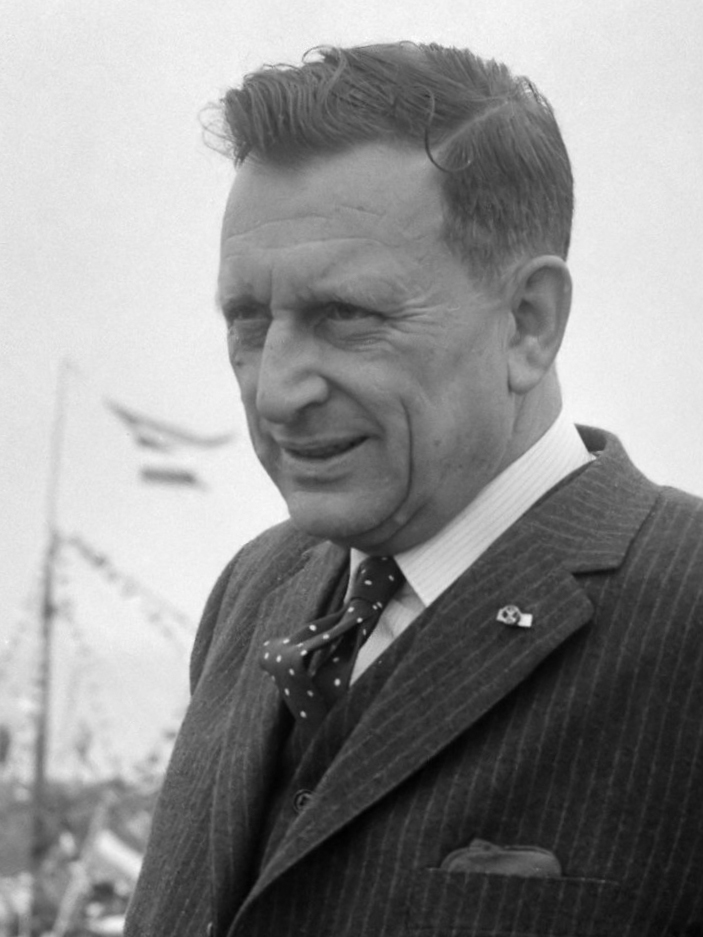
- Ko Suurhoff in 1965

Minister of Transport and Water Management
- In office 30 June 1966 – 22 November 1966
- Prime Minister: Jo Cals
- Preceded by: Pieter Bogaers (Ad interim)
- Succeeded by: Jan de Quay
- In office 14 April 1965 – 1 May 1966
- Prime Minister: Jo Cals
- Preceded by: Jan van Aartsen
- Succeeded by: Pieter Bogaers (Ad interim)

Chairman of the Labour Party
- In office 24 March 1961 – 14 April 1965
- Leader: Jaap Burger (1961–1962); Anne Vondeling (1962–1965)
- Preceded by: Hein Vos
- Succeeded by: Sjeng Tans

Minister of the Interior
- In office 13 October 1956 – 29 October 1956; Ad interim
- Prime Minister: Willem Drees
- Preceded by: Julius Christiaan van Oven (Ad interim)
- Succeeded by: Teun Struycken as Minister of the Interior, Property and Public; Sector Organisations

Minister of Social Affairs and Health
- In office 2 September 1952 – 22 December 1958
- Prime Minister: Willem Drees
- Preceded by: Dolf Joekes
- Succeeded by: Louis Beel

Member of the House of Representatives
- In office 23 February 1967 – 14 March 1967
- In office 20 March 1959 – 14 April 1965
- In office 3 July 1956 – 3 October 1956
- In office 24 October 1946 – 2 September 1952
- In office 21 September 1939 – 4 June 1946
- Parliamentary group: Labour Party (1946–1965); Social Democratic; Workers' Party (1939–1946)

Personal details
- Born: Jacobus Gerardus Suurhoff; 23 July 1905 Amsterdam, Netherlands
- Died: 14 March 1967 (aged 61) Amsterdam, Netherlands
- Cause of death: Cancer
- Party: Labour Party (from 1946)
- Other political affiliations: Social Democratic; Workers' Party (1923–1946)
- Spouse: Alida Voorzanger (m. 1930)
- Children: 2 sons and 2 daughters
- Occupation: Politician · Trade Union leader · Accountant · Activist

Military service
- Allegiance: Netherlands
- Branch/service: Royal Netherlands Army
- Years of service: 1925–1927 (Conscription); 1927–1935 (Reserve)
- Rank: Staff sergeant
- Unit: Johan Willem Friso Regiment
- Battles/wars: Interbellum

Jacobus Gerardus "Ko" Suurhoff (23 July 1905 – 14 March 1967) was a Dutch politician of the defunct Social Democratic Workers' Party (SDAP) and co-founder of the Labour Party (PvdA) and trade union leader.

== Biography ==
Suurhoff attended a Lyceum in Amsterdam from May 1917 until July 1920. Suurhoff worked as a clerk for the Netherlands Steamship Company (SMN) from July 1920 until December 1924. Suurhoff was conscripted in the Royal Netherlands Army serving in the infantry Johan Willem Friso Regiment as a staff sergeant from January 1925 until October 1927. Suurhoff worked as an accountant for the trading company Ceteco from October 1927 until April 1930. Suurhoff worked as a trade union leader for the Dutch Trade Unions association (NVV) from April 1930 until May 1940. Suurhoff served on the Municipal Council of Amsterdam from June 1939 until February 1941.

Suurhoff became a Member of the House of Representatives after Willem Albarda was appointed as Minister of Water Management in the Cabinet De Geer II, taking office on 21 September 1939 serving as a backbencher. On 10 May 1940 Nazi Germany invaded the Netherlands and the government fled to London to escape the German occupation. During the German occupation Suurhoff continued to serve as a Member of the House of Representatives in name only but in reality the de facto political influence of the House of Representatives was marginalized by the German occupation authority.

On 4 May 1942 Suurhoff was arrested by the Gestapo and detained in Kamp Sint-Michielsgestel and was released on 21 June 1943. Following the end of World War II Queen Wilhelmina ordered a Recall of Parliament and Suurhoff remained in the House of Representatives. Suurhoff again served on the Municipal Council of Amsterdam from June 1945 until October 1946. On 9 February 1946 the Social Democratic Workers' Party (SDAP), the Free-thinking Democratic League (VDB) and the Christian Democratic Union (CDU) choose to merge to form the Labour Party (PvdA). Suurhoff was one of the co-founders and became one of the unofficial Deputy Leaders of the Labour Party. After the election of 1946 Suurhoff wasn't reelected and he continued to serve until the end of the parliamentary term on 4 June 1946.

Suurhoff again worked as a trade union leader for the Dutch Trade Unions association from June 1946 until September 1952 serving as General-Secretary of the Executive Board from August 1949 until September 1952. Suurhoff returned as a Member of the House of Representatives following the resignation of Jo Stokvis, taking office on 24 October 1946 serving as a frontbencher and spokesperson for Social Affairs. After the election of 1952 Suurhoff was appointed as Minister of Social Affairs and Health in the Cabinet Drees II, taking office on 2 September 1952. After the election of 1956 Suurhoff returned as Member of the House of Representatives, taking office on 3 July 1956. Following the cabinet formation of 1956 Suurhof continued as Minister of Social Affairs and Health in the Cabinet Drees III, taking office on 13 October 1956. Suurhoff served as acting Minister of the Interior from 13 October 1956 until 29 October 1956 until the appointment of Teun Struycken who had served as Governor of the Netherlands Antilles. The Cabinet Drees III fell on 11 December 1958 on after the Labour Party and the Catholic People's Party (KVP) disagreed on a proposed Tax increase and continued to serve in a demissionary capacity until the cabinet formation of 1958 when it was replaced by caretaker Cabinet Beel II on 22 December 1958.

After the election of 1959 Suurhoff again returned as Member of the House of Representatives, taking office on 20 March 1959 serving as a frontbencher chairing the parliamentary committee for Social Affairs and special parliamentary committee for the Merger Treaty and spokesperson for Social Affairs. Suurhoff also served as Chairman of the Labour Party from 24 March 1961 until 14 April 1965. On 27 February 1965 the Cabinet Marijnen fell and continued to serve in a demissionary capacity until the cabinet formation of 1965 when it was replaced with the Cabinet Cals with Suurhoff appointed as Minister of Transport and Water Management, taking office on 14 April 1965. Suurhoff took a medical leave of absence from 1 May 1966 until 30 June 1966 during which Minister of Housing and Spatial Planning Pieter Bogaers served as acting Minister of Transport and Water Management. The Cabinet Cals fell on 14 October 1966 after the Leader of the Catholic People's Party Norbert Schmelzer had proposed a motion that called for a stronger austerity policy to further reduce the deficit was seen an indirect motion of no confidence and continued to serve in a demissionary capacity until the cabinet formation of 1966 when it was replaced by the caretaker Cabinet Zijlstra on 22 November 1966. After the election of 1967 Suurhoff again returned as a Member of the House of Representatives, taking office on 23 February 1967 but shortly thereafter he was diagnosed with terminal cancer, he died a month later at the age of 61.

Suurhoff was known for his abilities as a debater and manager. He holds the distinction as the third longest-serving Minister of Social Affairs after World War II with 6 years, 111 days.

== Decorations ==
Honours
Ribbon bar	Honour	Country	Date	Comment
	Grand Officer of the Order of Orange-Nassau	Netherlands	22 December 1958	
	Commander of the Order of the Netherlands Lion	Netherlands	5 December 1966	Elevated from Knight (28 April 1951)

Party political offices
Preceded by Hein Vos	Chairman of the Labour Party; 1961–1965	Succeeded by Sjeng Tans
Political offices
Preceded by Dolf Joekes	Minister of Social; Affairs and Health; 1952–1958	Succeeded by Louis Beel
Preceded by Julius Christiaan van Oven; Ad interim	Minister of the Interior; Ad interim 1956	Succeeded by Teun Struycken as Minister of the Interior, Property and Public; Sector Organisations
Preceded by Jan van Aartsen	Minister of Transport and Water Management; 1965–1966; 1966	Succeeded by Pieter Bogaers; Ad interim
Preceded by Pieter Bogaers; Ad interim	Minister of Transport and Water Management; 1965–1966; 1966	Succeeded by Jan de Quay
