= Greet Hofmans =

Dutch faith healer (1894 – 1968)

- Greet Hofmans in 1956
- Born: Margaretha Hofmans; 23 June 1894; Amsterdam, the Netherlands
- Died: 16 November 1968 (aged 74); Amsterdam, the Netherlands

Greet Hofmans (23 June 1894 – 16 November 1968) was a Dutch faith healer and "hand layer". For nine years she was a friend and advisor of Queen Juliana, often residing at Palace Soestdijk. She became the former Dutch queen's confidante in the 1950s, but was removed from the royal court after an affair that in the Netherlands is often referred to by her name, the Greet Hofmans affair.

== Court crisis (1948–1956) ==
Hofmans was introduced at the Dutch Royal Court on the initiative of Prince Bernhard in 1948 to treat the eye sickness of Princess Maria Christina. This illness arose after Juliana was infected with rubella during the pregnancy. Hofmans developed a great influence on the queen, encouraging pacifist ideas. In the period of the Cold War this caused a crisis in the royal household. Reputedly it reached the point where it threatened the marriage of Juliana and Bernhard. This crisis, which lasted to 1956, split the Dutch court into two camps. On the one side were Juliana and other admirers of Hofmans. On the other side were her husband Prince Bernhard, his supporters and the children of him and Juliana, including the later Dutch queen, Beatrix.

Outside the Netherlands, a great deal was written and speculated about the Hofmans affair. On 13 June 1956 an article appeared in the German magazine Der Spiegel subtitled "Zwischen Königin und Rasputin", literally meaning "Between queen and Rasputin". Reportedly it was Bernhard who provided the information for the article, by which means he hoped to have Hofmans removed from the court.

The British newspaper Daily Mirror covered the crisis with the headline Royal Crisis over A Faith-Healer.

== Beel Commission (1956) ==
The cabinet of Willem Drees banned the import of the edition of the German magazine and on 28 June 1956 appointed a commission of enquiry of former ministers (Louis Beel and Pieter Sjoerds Gerbrandy) and former governor-general of the Dutch East Indies A. W. L. Tjarda van Starkenborgh Stachouwer: the Beel Commission. The outcome was the termination of Hofmans' contacts with the court and the reorganisation of the royal household.

Through the secrecy imposed on the official side and the self-censorship of the Dutch press, the Hofmans affair took on a life of its own. Some have speculated that the affair was simply a mask for a looming divorce of the royal couple.

Despite being banned from the court, Hofmans retained influential followers, who saw in her the personification of the ideal life: sober, peaceful, free of self-interest, and directed at one's fellow man. Others viewed her as a charlatan, an intrigant, and a dangerous "witch", or at best a naive figure. She kept treating patients until she died from cancer in 1968. She was buried at Zorgvlied cemetery.

On 7 February 2004 Bernhard wrote in an open letter to the Volkskrant newspaper:

"with respect to the so-named Hofmans affair, I recall that the Beel Commission in 1956 conducted an exhaustive investigation. The report of this commission is for formal reasons still not public, therefore I express here my confidence that the eventual publication will place all those involved in this complex affair in the correct light".

== Fasseur study (2008) ==
In November 2008, the Dutch historian Cees Fasseur revealed in his book Juliana & Bernhard. Story of a marriage, 1936–1956 that Hofmans left the Dutch royal court in 1956 after receiving a letter warning that both she and Queen Juliana’s private secretary Walraven van Heeckeren would be "assassinated if she did not leave “voluntarily". The existence of the anonymous letter, signed by "the Action Committee", was kept secret until that publication. However, it was known that two members of former Dutch resistance groups had sent a letter to Queen Juliana’s mother, Wilhelmina, suggesting a violent solution for the crisis within the monarchy caused by Hofmans’ closeness to Queen Juliana.

Author Fasseur said he did not know if Bernhard, who had close ties with the former resistance, knew about the liquidation threat – or if he perhaps gave the order to send such a threat himself. Fasseur was the first who was granted permission by the then Queen Beatrix to read files related to the affair, that had been kept in the royal archives along with the 1956 secret report of the Beel Commission. The long-secret report of the commission appeared as an appendix to Fasseur’s book in 2008.

The Vereniging tegen de Kwakzalverij (Dutch association against charlatans, or quackery) has ranked Hofmans in the 14th place of the top twenty charlatans of the 20th century in the Netherlands.
