= Louis Beel =

Prime Minister of the Netherlands (1946–1948; 1958–1959)

His Excellency Louis Beel
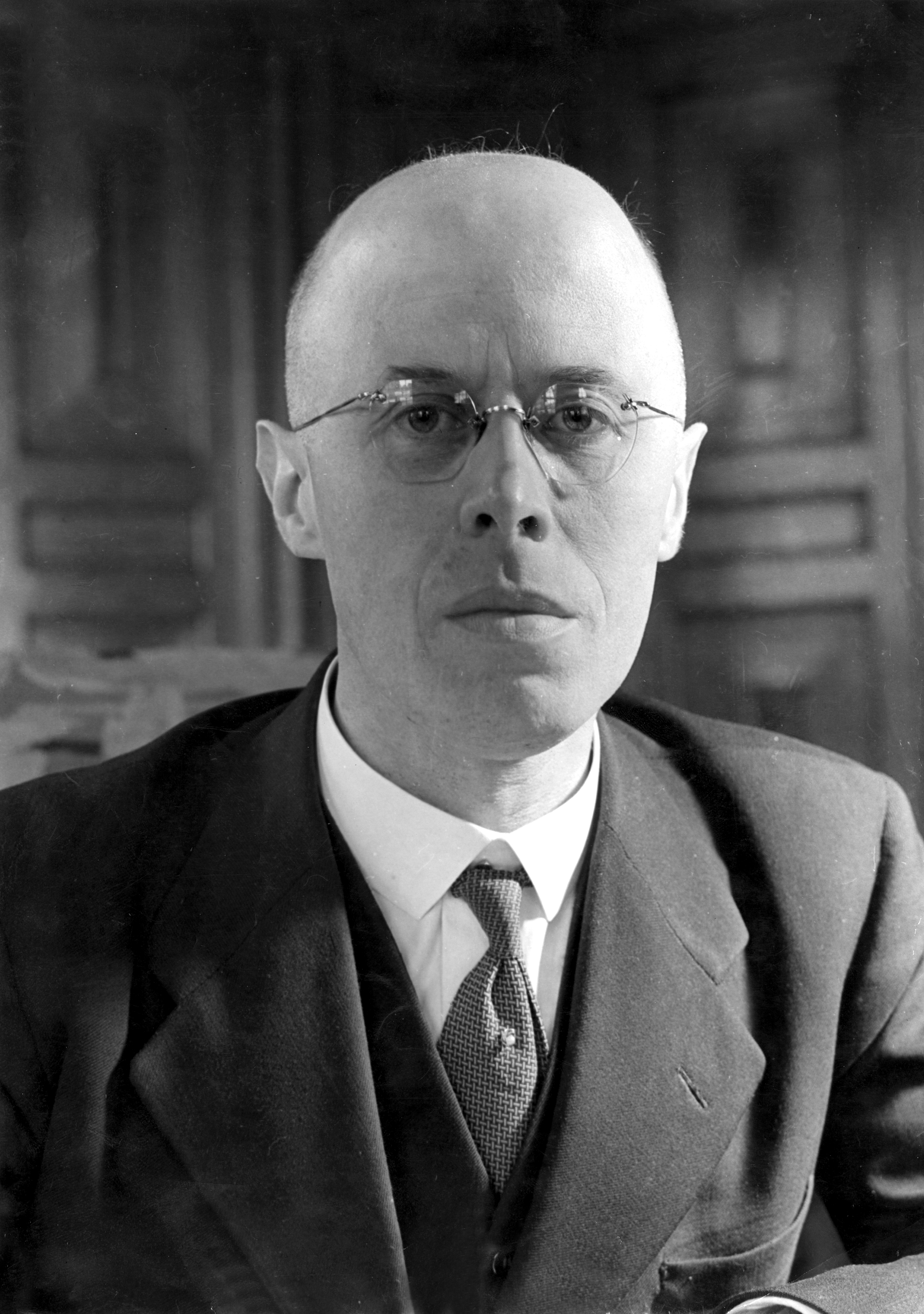
- Official portrait, c. 1958

Vice-President of the Council of State
- In office 1 August 1959 – 1 July 1972
- Monarch: Juliana
- Preceded by: Bram Rutgers
- Succeeded by: Marinus Ruppert

Member of the Council of State
- In office 1 June 1959 – 1 August 1959
- In office 1 April 1958 – 22 December 1958
- Vice President: Bram Rutgers

Prime Minister of the Netherlands
- In office 22 December 1958 – 19 May 1959
- Monarch: Juliana
- Deputy: Teun Struycken
- Preceded by: Willem Drees
- Succeeded by: Jan de Quay
- In office 3 July 1946 – 7 August 1948
- Monarch: Wilhelmina
- Deputy: Willem Drees
- Preceded by: Willem Schermerhorn
- Succeeded by: Willem Drees

Deputy Prime Minister of the Netherlands
- In office 2 September 1952 – 7 July 1956
- Monarch: Juliana
- Prime Minister: Willem Drees
- Preceded by: Josef van Schaik
- Succeeded by: Teun Struycken

High Representative of the Crown in the Dutch East Indies
- In office 29 October 1948 – 18 May 1949
- Monarch: Juliana
- Prime Minister: Willem Drees
- Preceded by: Hubertus van Mook (as Lieutenant Governor-General)
- Succeeded by: Tony Lovink

Member of the House of Representatives
- In office 27 July 1948 – 7 September 1948
- In office 4 June 1946 – 3 July 1946
Ministerial offices
Minister of Social Affairs and Health
In office 22 December 1958 – 19 May 1959
Prime Minister	Himself
Preceded by	Ko Suurhoff
Succeeded by	Charles van Rooy
Minister of Justice
Ad interim
In office 4 February 1956 – 15 February 1956
Prime Minister	Willem Drees
Preceded by	Leendert Antonie Donker
Succeeded by	Julius Christiaan van Oven
Minister of Social Work
Ad interim
In office 2 September 1952 – 9 September 1952
Prime Minister	Willem Drees
Preceded by	Office established
Succeeded by	Frans-Jozef van Thiel
Minister of the Interior
In office 6 December 1951 – 7 July 1956
Prime Minister	Willem Drees
Preceded by	Frans Teulings (ad interim)
Succeeded by	Julius Christiaan van Oven (ad interim)
In office 23 February 1945 – 15 September 1947
Prime Minister	See list: Pieter Sjoerds Gerbrandy (1945); Willem Schermerhorn (1945–1946); Louis Beel (1946–1947)
Preceded by	Hendrik van Boeijen (ad interim)
Succeeded by	Piet Witteman
Minister of Colonial Affairs
Ad interim
In office 30 August 1947 – 3 November 1947
Prime Minister	Himself
Preceded by	Jan Jonkman
Succeeded by	Jan Jonkman

Personal details
- Born: Louis Joseph Maria Beel; 12 April 1902 Roermond, Netherlands
- Died: 11 February 1977 (aged 74) Utrecht, Netherlands
- Party: Catholic People's Party
- Other political affiliations: Roman Catholic State Party (1933–1945)
- Spouse: Jet van der Meulen (m. 1926; died 1971)
- Education: Radboud University Nijmegen (LL.B., LL.M., PhD)
- Occupation: Politician; civil servant; jurist; lawyer; researcher; author; professor; nonprofit director

Louis Joseph Maria Beel (12 April 1902 – 11 February 1977) was a Dutch politician of the Roman Catholic State Party (RKSP) and later co-founder of the Catholic People's Party (KVP) and jurist who served as Prime Minister of the Netherlands from 3 July 1946 until 7 August 1948 and from 22 December 1958 until 19 May 1959.

Beel studied Law at the Radboud University Nijmegen obtaining a Master of Laws degree and worked as a civil servant in Eindhoven and for the provincial executive of Overijssel from July 1929 until May 1942 and as a researcher at his alma mater before finishing his thesis and graduating as a Doctor of Law in Administrative law and during World War II worked as a lawyer in Eindhoven from May 1942 until January 1945. Shortly before the end of the War, Beel was appointed as Minister of the Interior in the Gerbrandy III cabinet, the last government-in-exile taking office on 23 February 1945. After a cabinet formation, Beel retained his position in the national unity Schermerhorn–Drees cabinet. After the 1946 general election Beel was asked to lead a new cabinet and following a successful cabinet formation with Labour Leader Willem Drees formed the Beel I cabinet and became Prime Minister of the Netherlands and dual served as Minister of the Interior taking office on 3 July 1946.

After the 1948 general election, Beel failed to achieve a new coalition following a difficult cabinet formation and was elected as a Member of the House of Representatives on 27 July 1948. Beel left office following the installation of the Drees–Van Schaik cabinet on 7 August 1948 and continued to serve in the House of Representatives as a backbencher. In September 1948, Beel was nominated as the next high commissioner of the Dutch East Indies, serving from 29 October 1948 until 18 May 1949 and worked as a professor of administrative law and public administration at his alma mater and the Catholic Economic University from October 1949 until December 1951. Following a cabinet reshuffle he was again appointed as minister of the interior in the Drees I cabinet, taking office on 6 December 1951. After the 1952 general election, Beel continued his office in the Drees II cabinet and also became deputy prime minister, taking office on 2 September 1952. On 7 July 1956 Beel, resigned after his appointment to lead a special commission investigating a political crisis concerning the royal family. In February 1958, Beel was nominated as a Member of the Council of State taking office on 1 April 1958. After the fall of the Drees III cabinet, Beel was asked to lead an interim cabinet until the next election, and following a successful cabinet formation formed the caretaker Beel II cabinet and again became Prime Minister of the Netherlands and dual served as Minister of Social Affairs and Health taking office on 22 December 1958.

Before the 1959 general election, Beel indicated that he would not serve another term as prime minister or not stand for the election. Beel left office a second time following the installation of the De Quay cabinet on 19 May 1959. Beel continued to be active in politics and in July 1959 was nominated as the next Vice-President of the Council of State, serving from 1 August 1959 until 1 July 1972.

Beel retired from active politics at 70 and became active in the public sector as a non-profit director and served on several state commissions and councils on behalf of the government. Beel was known for his abilities as an efficient manager and effective consensus builder. Beel was granted the honorary title of minister of state on 21 November 1956 and continued to comment on political affairs as a statesman until he was diagnosed with leukemia in August 1976, dying six months later at the age of 74. He holds the distinction as the only prime minister to have served two non-consecutive terms after World War II and because of his short terms in office his premiership is therefore usually omitted both by scholars and the public in rankings but his legacy as a minister in the 1940s and 50s and later as Vice-President of the Council of State continue to this day.

== Biography ==
=== Early life ===
Louis Joseph Maria Beel was born on 12 April 1902 in Roermond, a town with a bishop's see in the province of Limburg, in the very south of the Netherlands. He grew up in a predominantly Roman Catholic community and went to school at the famous Bisschoppelijk College (Diocesan College) of Roermond. He graduated in 1920 and found work as clerk-volunteer at the municipality of Roermond. Two years later he became secretary to the Educational Religious Inspector of the Roermond diocese, Monsignor Petrus van Gils. When in 1923 a Catholic University was founded in Nijmegen (presently known as the Radboud University Nijmegen), Monsignor van Gils insisted on his secretary becoming a part-time law student in Nijmegen. In 1924 Beel began commuting between Roermond and Nijmegen. After obtaining his bachelor's degree in 1925 he found a new job as an administrative assistant in the government of the eastern province of Overijssel. He moved to its capital, the town of Zwolle, and left his place of birth Roermond. During the time he lived in Zwolle, Beel got married and his first child, a son, was born. In addition to being a provincial civil servant, Beel accepted a part-time lectureship at an institute for professional training, Katholieke Leergangen, and he wrote his first articles on legal subjects.

In 1928 Beel obtained his master's degree in law at Radboud University Nijmegen. Subsequently, he applied for a better job, and managed to find one as a clerk at the municipality of Eindhoven, also in the south of the Netherlands at that time a booming city as a result of the establishment of the Philips group. With his wife, his son and his mother-in-law he moved to Eindhoven in 1929 and lived there for more than fifteen years. Three daughters were born there. Beel's professional career progressed rapidly and in less than one year he became a principal clerk. As he had in Zwolle, Beel proved to be an industrious man. He continued his part-time lecturing at the Katholieke Leergangen, he published regularly in the legal press and in 1935 he obtained his doctorate in law at the Radboud University Nijmegen.

=== World War II ===
At the time of his resignation as a municipal Civil servant in 1942, Beel was Director of Social Affairs and Deputy Town Clerk. Beel resigned because he opposed the German occupation of the Netherlands. To avoid being taken prisoner by the German occupational forces he frequently had to go in hiding. Eindhoven was liberated on 18 September 1944 at the time of the World War II military offensive known as Operation Market Garden. Dutch resistance fighters, massively manifesting themselves immediately after the Germans had gone, saw Beel as one of them. He became the spokesman of a group of prominent citizens in Eindhoven, who had resisted the Germans during the war. The group was not in favour of a continuation of the pre-war political party-lines, with the ever-dominant Anti-Revolutionary Party. In this vein they sent an Address, drafted by Beel, to Queen Wilhelmina, who still resided in London. Beel was urged to accept the function of adviser to the Military Administration (Militair Gezag), the temporary government in the liberated southern part of the Netherlands under Supreme Headquarters Allied Expeditionary Force. In this capacity Beel was invited by the Dutch government-in-exile to travel to London and to advise on dealing with the war victims. He arrived in London on 1 January 1945. On 10 January he visited at her request Queen Wilhelmina in her English mansion Mortimer. This visit gave a decisive turn to Beel's life.

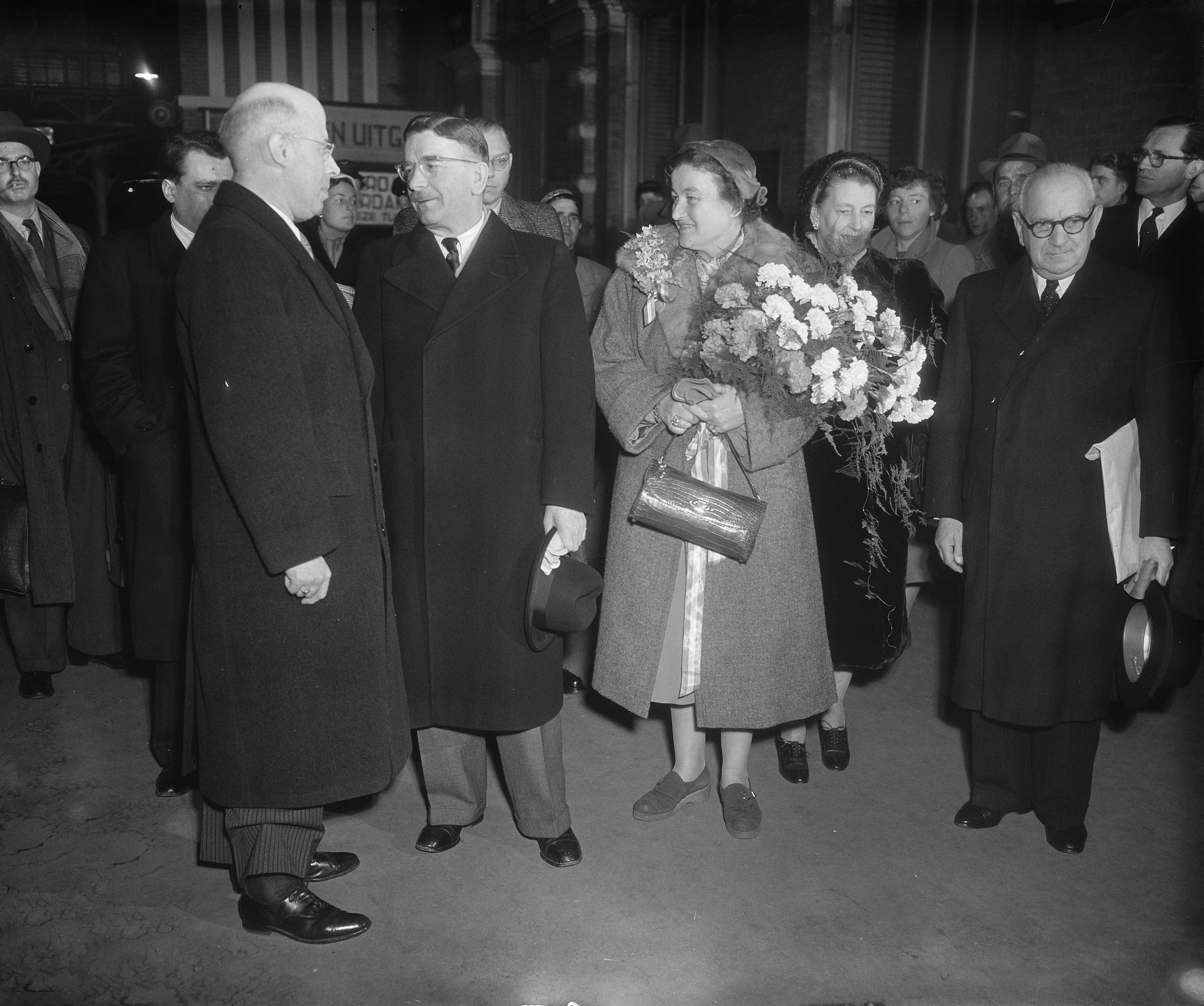
Prime Minister Louis Beel and Chancellor of Austria Leopold Figl at The Hague's Staatsspoor railway station on 21 October 1952

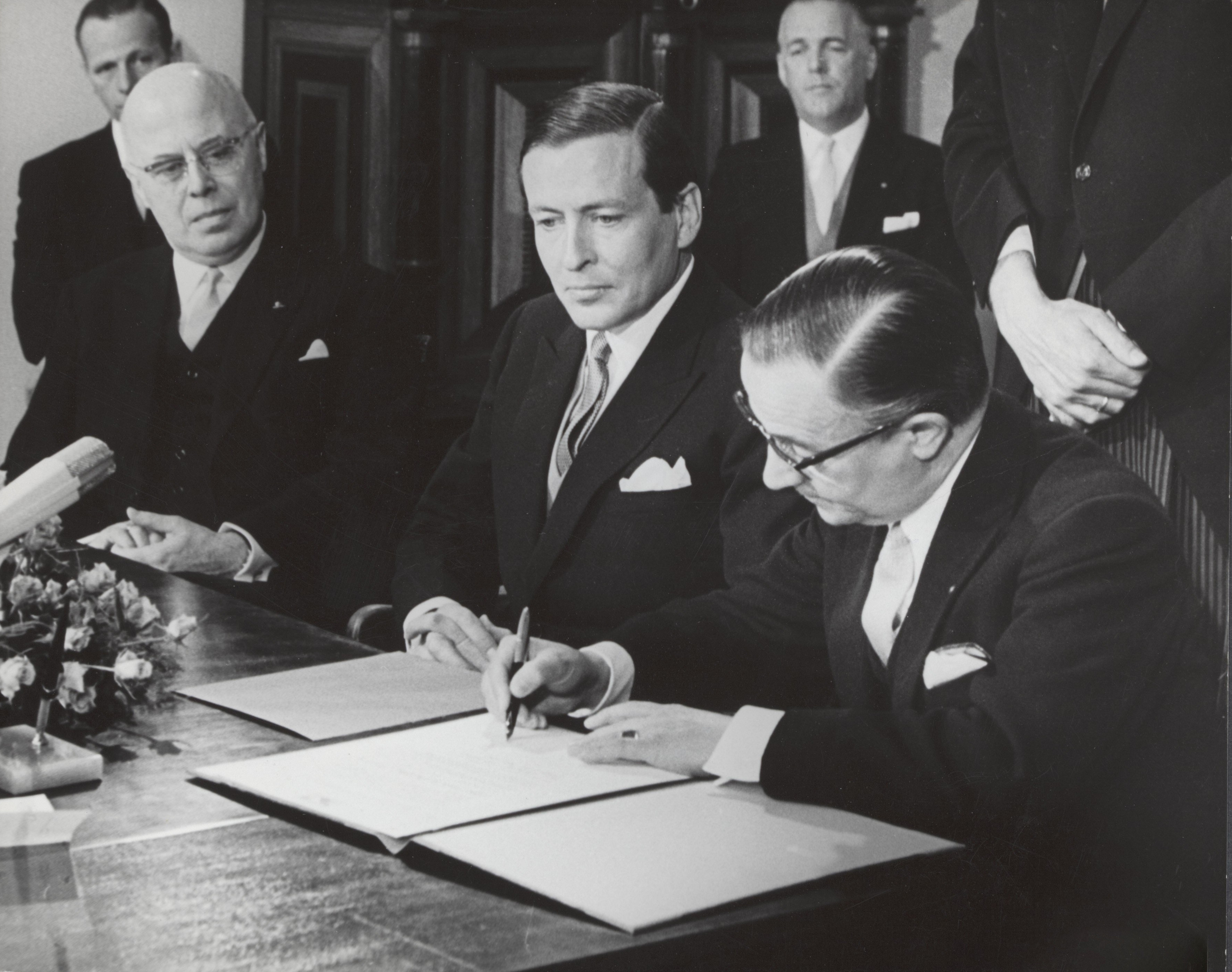
Vice-President of the Council of State Louis Beel, Prince Claus, and Prime Minister Piet de Jong during the announcement following the birth of Prince Willem-Alexander on 2 May 1967

=== Politics ===
The Queen intuitively saw in Beel, a Roman Catholic from the South who ostentatiously had rejected Nazism, the prototype of the patriot and of the sort of "renewed" person she was looking for to replace the members of her war cabinet, of whom she no longer wholeheartedly approved. Beel was promptly appointed Minister of the Interior in the third Gerbrandy cabinet. This cabinet resigned immediately after the end of the war, in May 1945, to free the path for a new one to be formed by two a liberal, Wim Schermerhorn, and social democrat, Willem Drees. They invited Beel to remain as Minister of the Interior in their cabinet (the Schermerhorn–Drees cabinet). According to his own words, Beel reluctantly agreed. He moved with his family from Eindhoven to Wassenaar, a villadom close to The Hague, the government's residence.

A post-war parliamentary election could finally be held in May 1946. In the election campaign Beel voiced the political resistance from the religious and liberal parties against the economic planning and socialism favoured by Prime Minister Schermerhorn and his political supporters. Unlike the British election of the previous year where the Labour Party gained a decisive victory, in the Netherlands the "Socialist breakthrough" which had been expected did not materialise in this first post-war election. The Catholic People's Party was the big winner, though no party had an overall majority. Queen Wilhelmina requested Beel to form a new cabinet. He became prime minister of a Roman/Red coalition, which he called the "New Truce", since it was the first cabinet in Dutch history of socialists and Roman Catholics. This Beel cabinet set the course for the political and economic development of the post-war Netherlands.

In social policy, temporary measures were introduced in December 1946 entitling wage-earners to an allowance for the first and second child under the age of 18. The Old Age Pensions Emergency Provisions Act of May 1947 provided means-tested pensions for all persons over the age of 65 regardless of their previous employment record, and the Pensioners' Family Allowances Act of July 1948 introduced family allowance for those in receipt of invalidity, old age, or survivors' benefits "according to the Invalidity Insurance Act 1919." In 1947, the duration of sickness benefits was doubled from 26 to 52 weeks. Under a law of 15 July 1948 (Stb. I 309) the age limit for the right to orphan's annuity under the Disability law went up from 14 to 16 years.

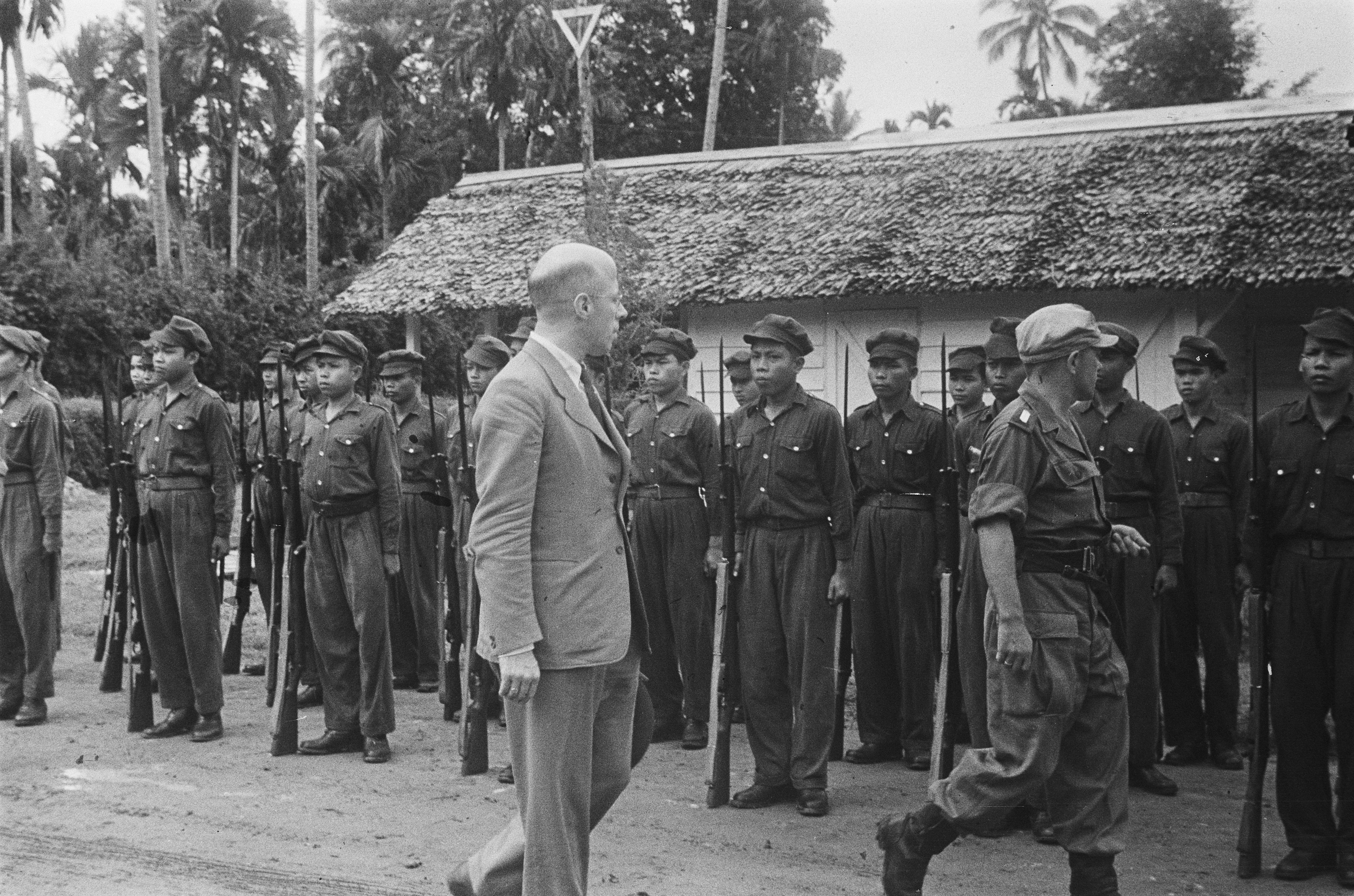
Prime Minister Louis Beel inspecting native soldiers during his visit to Sumatra

In 1948 a parliamentary election was again required for a constitutional renewal, which was thought necessary to solve the problems emerging in the Dutch East Indies, where the nationalists led by Sukarno and Hatta had proclaimed the independence of their country immediately after the Japanese surrender. The KVP won again and Beel was asked to form a new cabinet. He might again have become prime minister, but he failed to form the grand coalition of socialist, Catholic and liberal parties, which he deemed necessary to secure the corrections in the Constitution. Josef van Schaik, a fellow KVP politician, took over and succeeded in forming a broad based cabinet by offering the socialist Willem Drees the function of prime minister, Josef van Schaik himself being satisfied with the function of deputy prime minister. Drees appointed Beel High Representative of the Crown in the Dutch East Indies, as a successor to Lieutenant Governor General Hubertus van Mook, a man of proven managerial abilities, who had to resign unwillingly.

The Dutch government in The Hague made several attempts to reach an agreement with the Republic of Indonesia. Beel, stationed in Batavia (now named Jakarta), was not in favour of such an agreement because of his suspicions – later proven to be right – that the new Republic did not want the establishment of a federal state, as was planned in the Dutch decolonisation policy. Under the auspices of the United Nations Security Council an agreement was achieved in May 1949 to hold a Round Table Conference in The Hague in order to prepare the transfer of sovereignty. Beel made efforts to thwart the agreement. However he was unsuccessful and he resigned from his Office of High Representative of the Crown.

Beel returned to his home at the end of May 1949 and a few months later he accepted a professorate in administrative law at his Alma Mater in Nijmegen, one of his early ambitions.

On 7 November 1951, Johan van Maarseveen, Minister of the Interior, suddenly died. Prime Minister Drees appealed to Beel to return to office. Again reluctantly, Beel accepted Prime Minister Drees' offer. He also held the function of Minister of the Interior in the next Drees cabinet after the elections of 1952. In July 1956 Beel asked that he be allowed to resign from government to become, as a private citizen, chairman of a committee of three "wise men" that was requested by Queen Juliana and the Consort Prince Bernhard of Lippe-Biesterfeld to help solve problems pertaining to the royal family. The problems were related to faith healer Greet Hofmans, whom the Queen had invited to the royal palace in order to cure her youngest daughter, who had been born half blind in 1947. The renowned German magazine Der Spiegel had accused Mrs. Hofmans of playing a "Rasputin" role in the royal family. Within a month the committee had fulfilled its task by writing a secret report, which banished the sensitive affair from publicity. Three months later Beel was appointed Minister of State, a prestigious title of honour.

In 1958 after an interlude of eighteen months without a public office, Beel was appointed member of the Council of State. Soon afterwards however he was called upon to form his second cabinet – a rump cabinet from December 1958 until May 1959, that had to dissolve parliament and call a new election. After this election Beel assisted the Roman Catholic politician Jan de Quay in forming a Catholic–liberal cabinet, thus ending the Roman/red coalition, which had been Beel's own initiative in 1946. The De Quay cabinet appointed Beel as Vice-President of the Council of State, the most prestigious office in the Dutch administration, the head of state being the honorary President of the Council of State.

Whereas other political leaders, who had come forward after the war, one by one left the political scene and the "participation-democracy" of the New Left movement created a new type of politician, Beel retained in the authority of the Council of State a great influence on government. He owed his role to the way he performed his high office as well to his position of confidence with the royal family. In various affairs the royals faced, Beel's taciturn way of acting on behalf of the monarchy and his prudent pulling the strings behind the scene as Vice-President of the Dutch Council of State gave him the nickname "The Sphinx". The power he derived from both positions christened him "Viceroy of the Netherlands". The authority of Beel and his controlling influence in political circles became manifest when new cabinets had to be formed or cabinet crises had to be warded off. Through the thirteen years of his vice-presidency Beel had a steering hand in nearly every cabinet formation, including the dramatic formation of the cabinet of the social democrat Joop den Uyl in 1973.

=== Later life ===
As from 1 July 1972, at the age of seventy, Beel resigned (prematurely) from his office of Vice-President of the Council of State. His wife had died some years before. He retired with his mentally handicapped eldest daughter and her attendant to the quiet village of Doorn. On 11 February 1977 Beel died in the University Hospital Utrecht from leukemia.

Political offices
Preceded by Bram Rutgers	Vice-President of the Council of State; 1959–1972	Succeeded by Marinus Ruppert
Preceded by Willem Drees	Prime Minister of the Netherlands; Minister of General Affairs; 1958–1959	Succeeded by Jan de Quay
Preceded by Ko Suurhoff	Minister of Social Affairs and Health; 1958–1959	Succeeded by Charles van Rooy
Preceded by Leendert Antonie Donker	Minister of Justice (ad interim); 1956	Succeeded by Julius Christiaan van Oven
New office	Minister of Social Work (ad interim); 1952	Succeeded by Frans-Jozef van Thiel
Preceded by Josef van Schaik	Deputy Prime Minister of the Netherlands; 1952–1956	Succeeded by Teun Struycken
Preceded by Frans Teulings (ad interim)	Minister of the Interior; 1951–1956	Succeeded by Julius Christiaan van Oven (ad interim)
Preceded by Hubertus van Mook as Lieutenant Governor-General	High Representative of the Crown in the Dutch East Indies; 1948–1949	Succeeded by Tony Lovink
Preceded by Jan Jonkman	Minister of Colonial Affairs (ad interim); 1947	Succeeded by Jan Jonkman
Preceded by Hendrik van Boeijen (in 1945)	Minister of General Affairs; 1947–1948	Succeeded by Willem Drees
Preceded by Willem Schermerhorn	Prime Minister of the Netherlands; 1946–1948	Succeeded by Willem Drees
Preceded by Hendrik van Boeijen (ad interim)	Minister of the Interior; 1945–1947	Succeeded by Piet Witteman
