= De Quay cabinet =

Dutch cabinet, 1959 to 1963

- Cabinet of the Netherlands

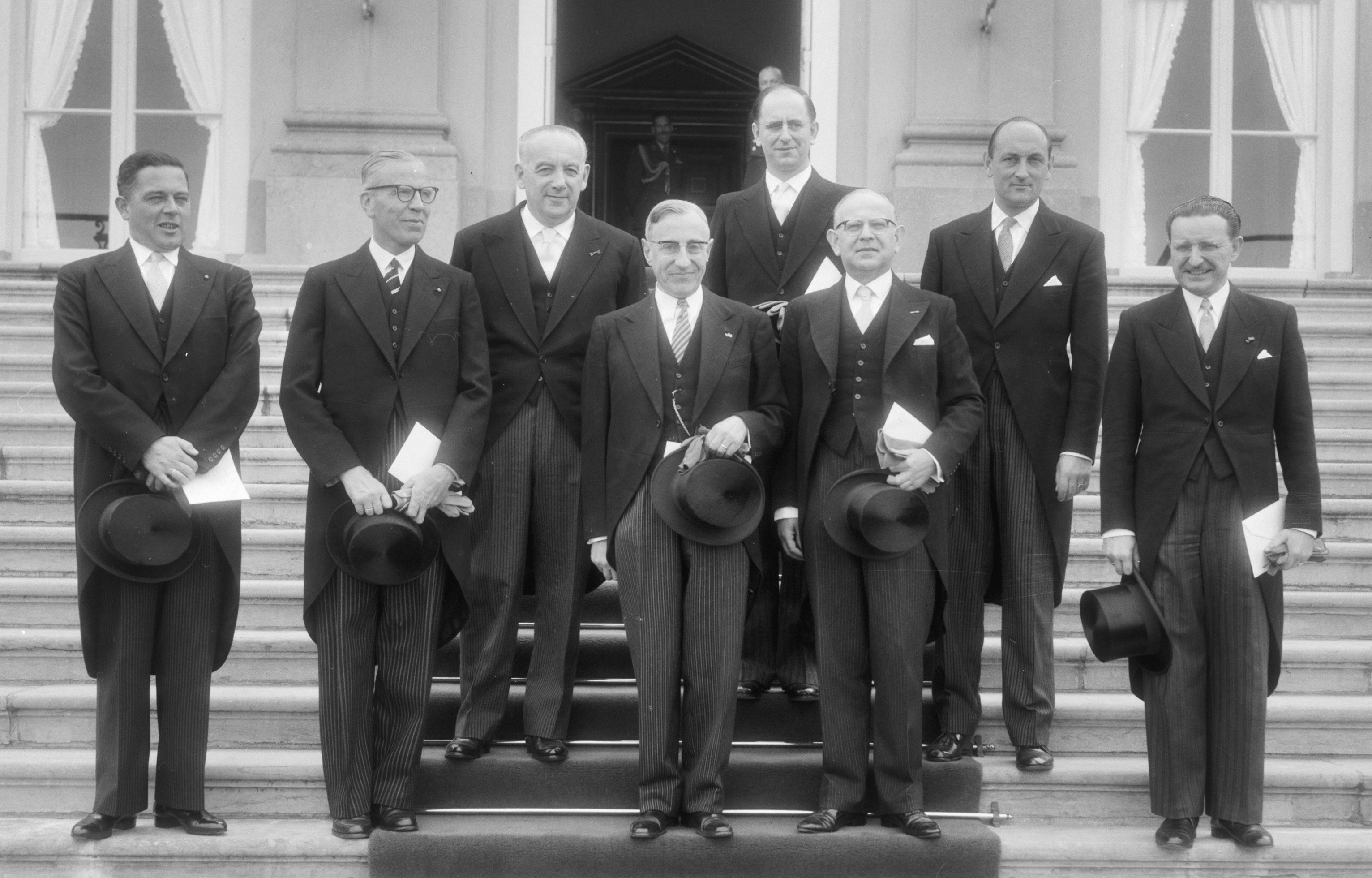
- The installation of the De Quay cabinet on 19 May 1959
- Date formed: 16 May 1959
- Date dissolved: 24 July 1963; 4 years, 69 days in office (Demissionary from 15 May 1963)

People and organisations
- Monarch: Queen Juliana
- Prime Minister: Jan de Quay
- Deputy Prime Minister: Henk Korthals
- No. of ministers: 14
- Ministers removed: 2
- Total no. of members: 16
- Member party: Catholic People's Party (KVP); People's Party for Freedom and Democracy (VVD); Anti-Revolutionary Party (ARP); Christian Historical Union (CHU)
- Status in legislature: Centre-right; Majority government

History
- Election: 1959 election
- Outgoing election: 1963 election
- Legislature terms: 1959–1963
- Incoming formation: 1959 formation
- Outgoing formation: 1963 formation
- Predecessor: Second Beel cabinet
- Successor: Marijnen cabinet

The De Quay cabinet was the executive branch of the Dutch Government from 19 May 1959 until 24 July 1963. The cabinet was formed by the christian-democratic Catholic People's Party (KVP), Anti-Revolutionary Party (ARP) and Christian Historical Union (CHU) and the conservative-liberal People's Party for Freedom and Democracy (VVD) after the election of 1959. The cabinet was a centre-right coalition and had a substantial majority in the House of Representatives with prominent Catholic politician Jan de Quay the former Queen's Commissioner of North Brabant serving as Prime Minister. Prominent Liberal politician Henk Korthals served as Deputy Prime Minister, Minister of Transport and Water Management and was given the portfolio of Suriname and Netherlands Antilles Affairs.

The cabinet served in the early years of the tumultuous 1960s; domestically it had to deal with the beginning of the counterculture and the discovery of the Groningen gas field and it was able to implement several major social reforms to the education system and the public sector and social security, internationally the West New Guinea dispute resulted in the disbandment of the Netherlands New Guinea territory following the Battle of Arafura Sea. The cabinet suffered several major internal conflicts including multiple cabinet resignations, but completed its entire term and was succeeded by a continuation of the coalition in the Marijnen cabinet following the election of 1963.

== Formation ==
Cabinet formation was again difficult due to the growing friction between Labour Party and the Catholic People's Party. Despite the fact that this was the first post-war cabinet with the right-wing VDD and without the socialist PvdA, it continued with the building up social security that was started after the war, made possible by the continually growing economy.

== Term ==
The free Saturday was introduced (for civil servants, in 1961), as well as laws for education (mammoetwet), unemployment benefit (bijstandwet) and child benefit (kinderbijslagwet). Natural gas was discovered in Slochteren, which would later turn out to be one of the biggest gas reserves in the world and a major source of income for the Netherlands in the decades to come.

On 23 December 1960 the cabinet fell over extra public housing (woningwetwoningen), but Gaius de Gaay Fortman reconciled matters and the cabinet resumed on 2 January 1961.

In August/September 1962, New Guinea was handed over to Indonesia, under supervision of the UN.

Shortly after the installation of the new government, minister of defence Ven den Bergh resigned for personal reasons (family affairs with his United States wife and children). In 1962, the new minister of defence Visser also had to resign after protests against his dismissal of a critical civil servant. In 1961 minister Van Rooy of social affairs resigned after criticism of how he dealt with the new child benefit law. His post was taken over by former state secretary Veldkamp, whose now vacant former position in turn was taken over by Gijzels.

In 1963, a proposal to install commercial television was not accepted.

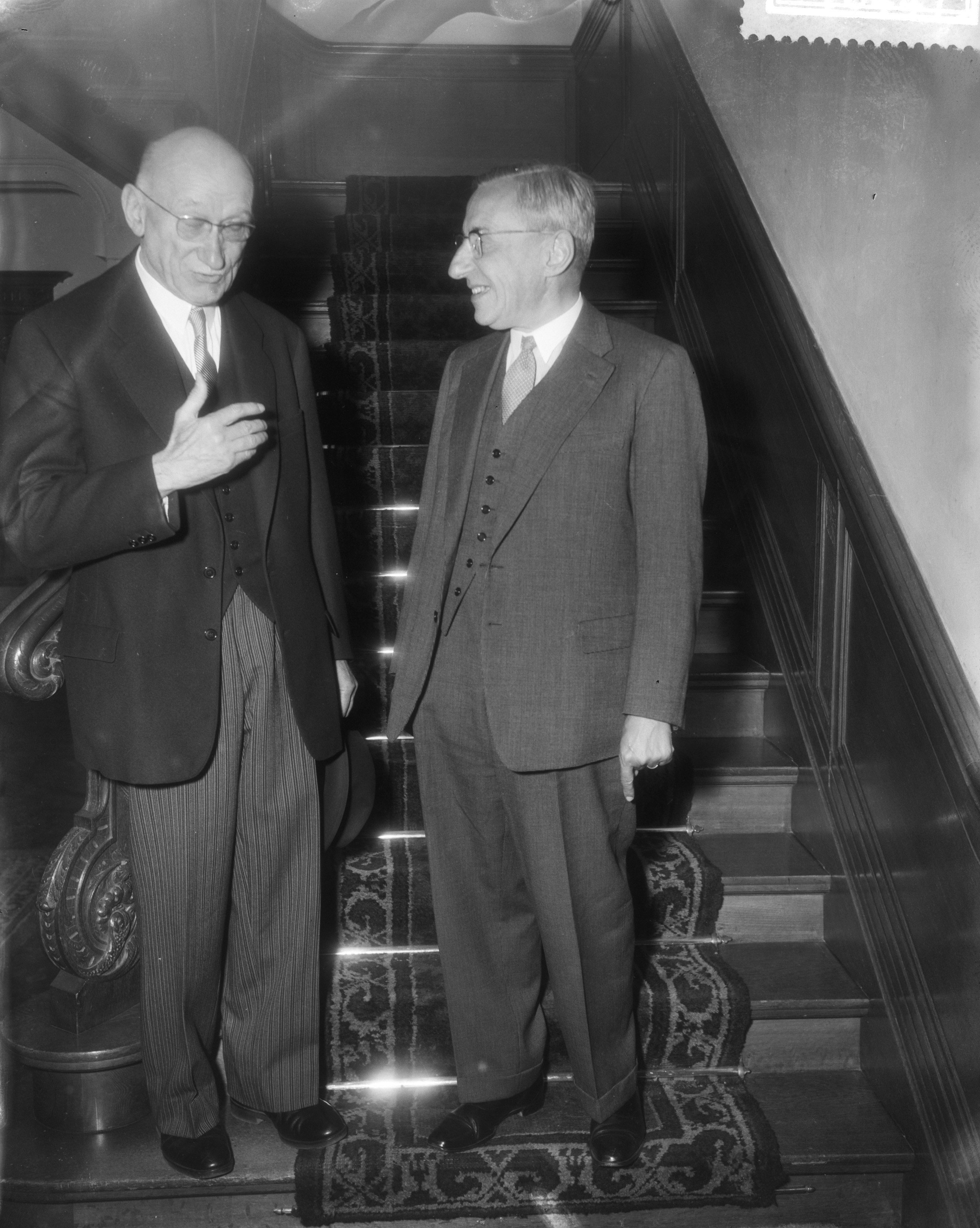
President of the European Parliament Robert Schuman and Prime Minister Jan de Quay at Ministry of General Affairs on 16 June 1959.

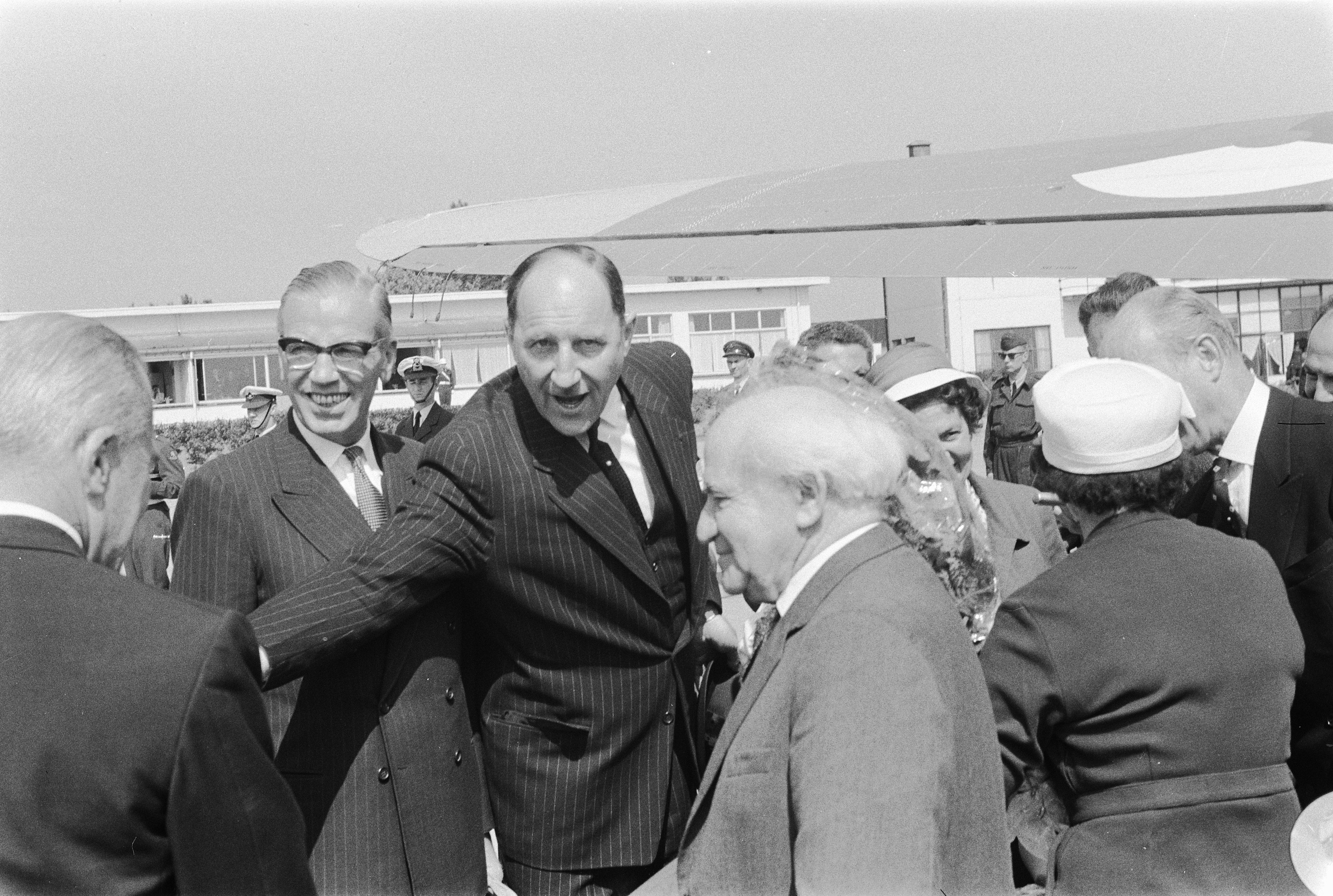
Minister Albert Beerman, Minister Joseph Luns and Prime Minister of Israel David Ben-Gurion at Ypenburg Airport on 22 June 1960.

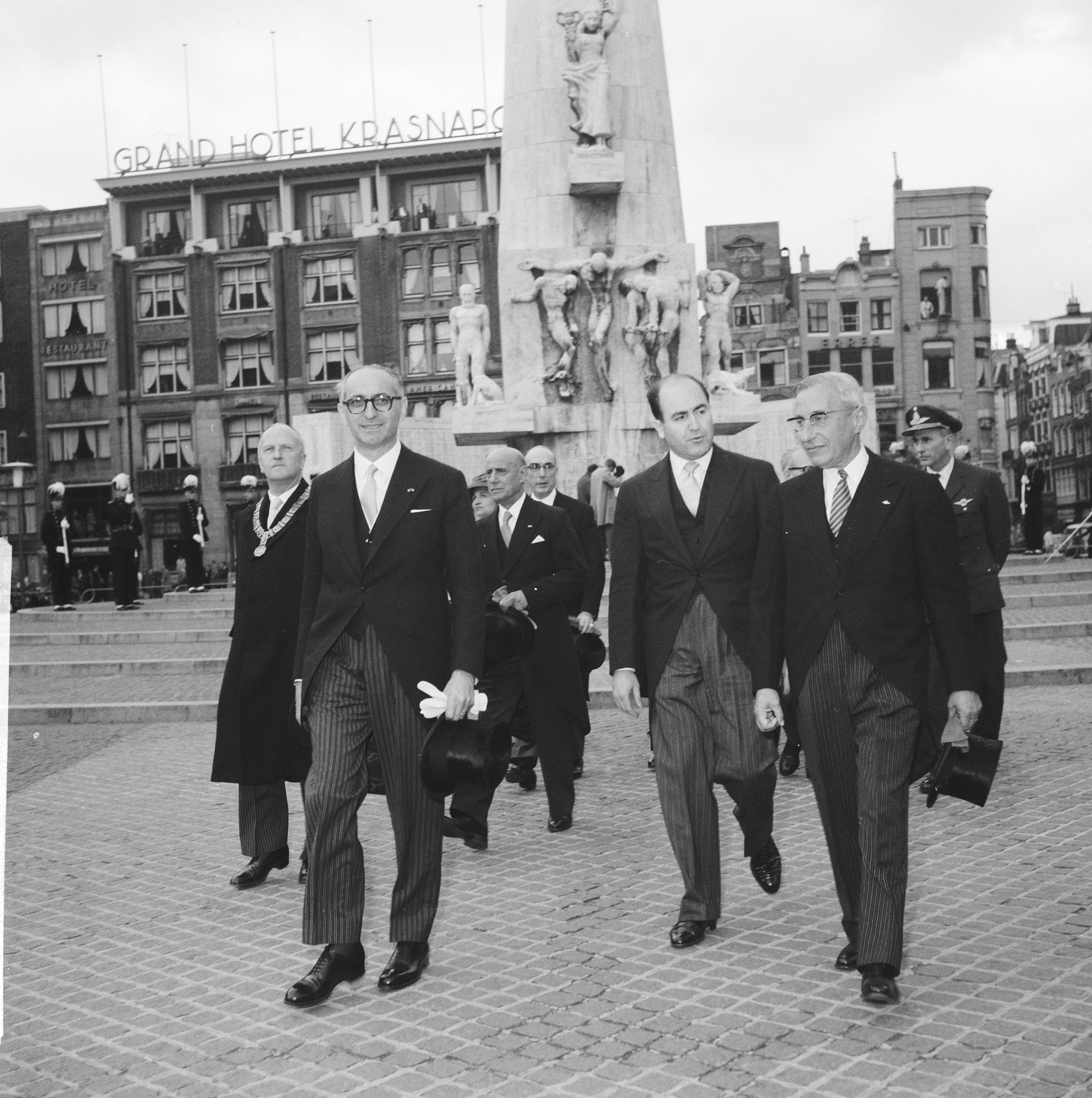
President of Argentina Arturo Frondizi and Prime Minister Jan de Quay at the Dam Square in Amsterdam on 1 July 1960.

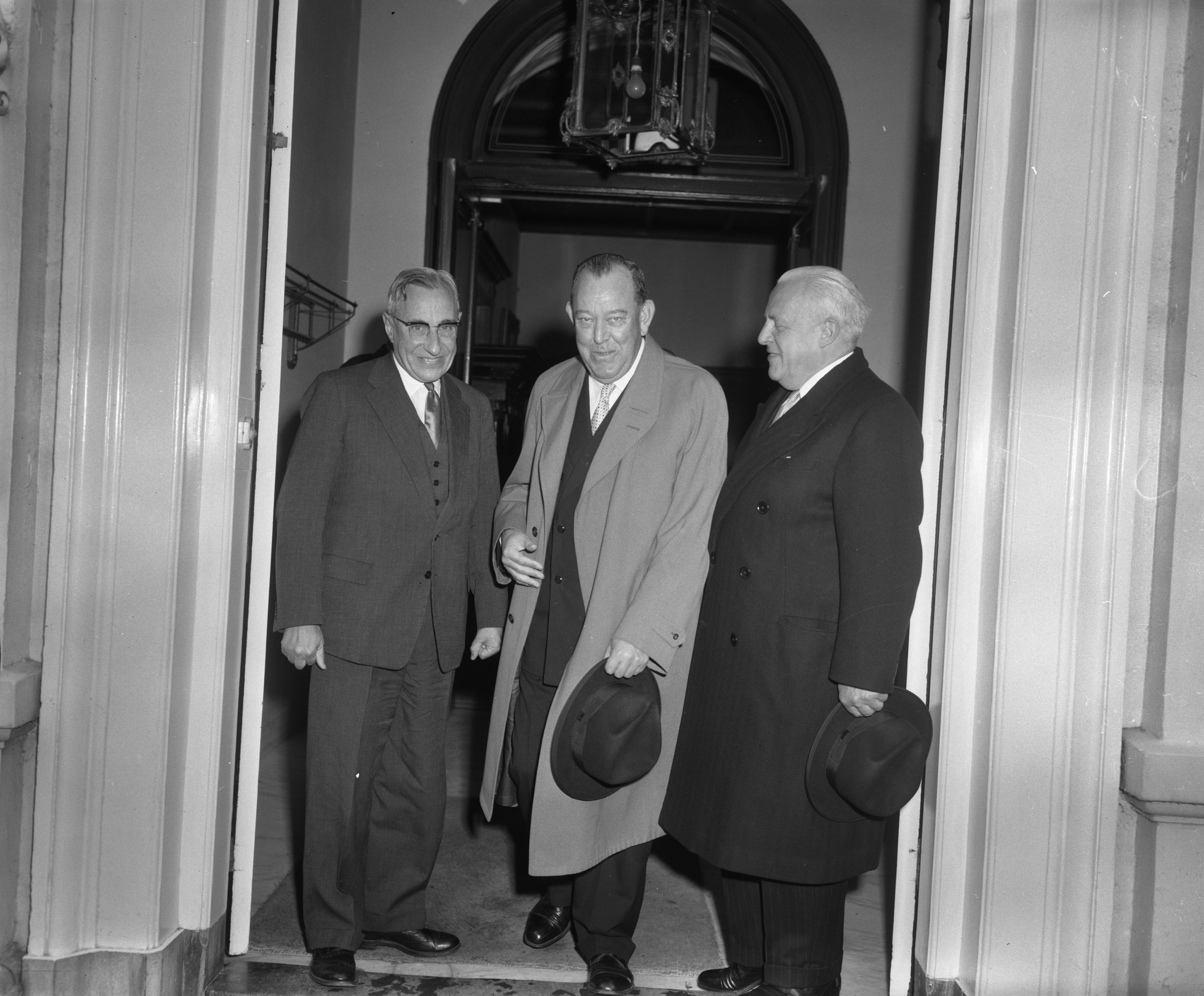
Prime Minister Jan de Quay and County Governor of Akershus Trygve Lie at the Norwegian embassy in The Hague on 18 October 1960.

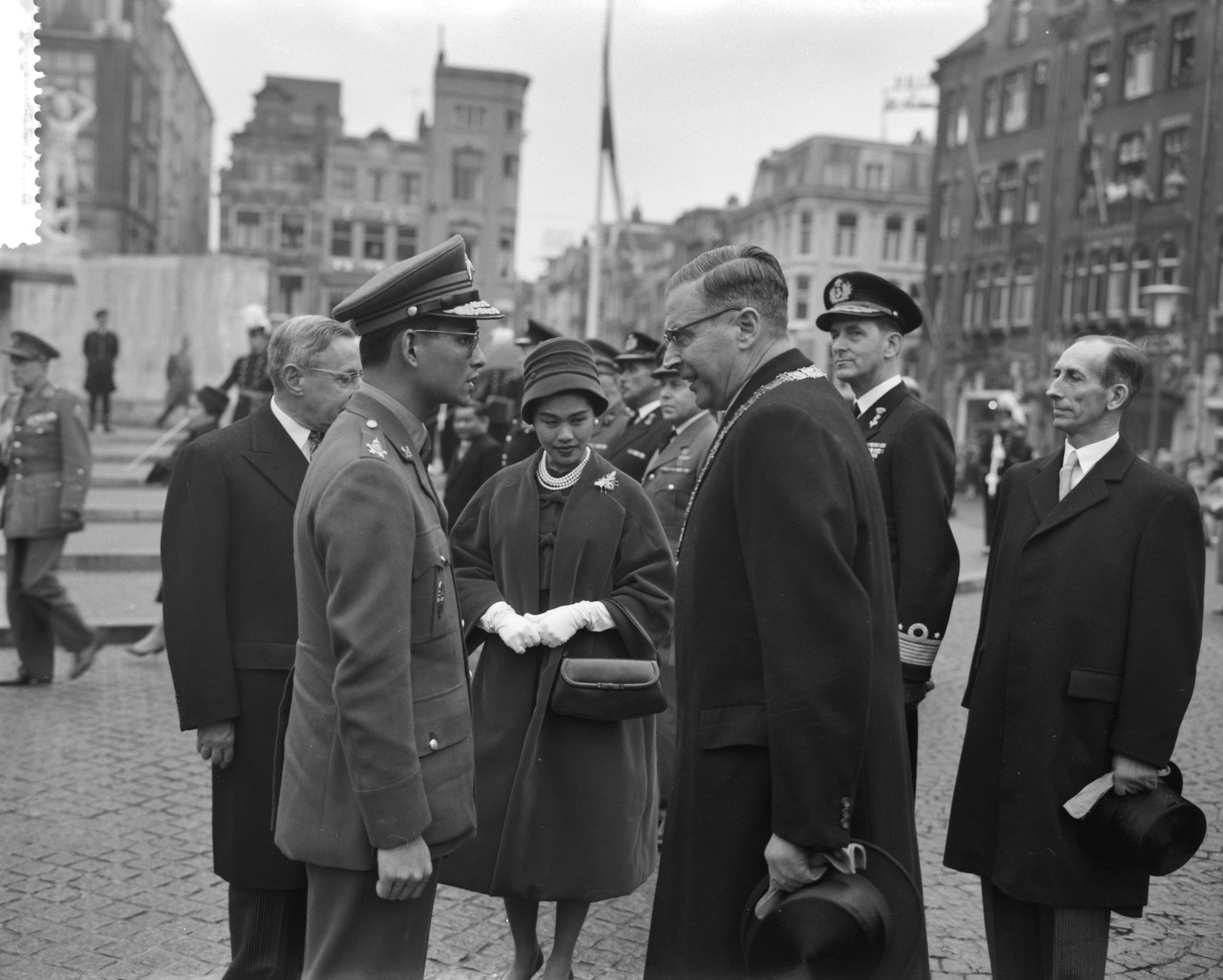
King of Thailand Bhumibol Adulyadej, Queen of Thailand Sirikit, Prime Minister Jan de Quay and Mayor of Amsterdam Gijs van Hall at the Dam Square in Amsterdam on 24 October 1960.

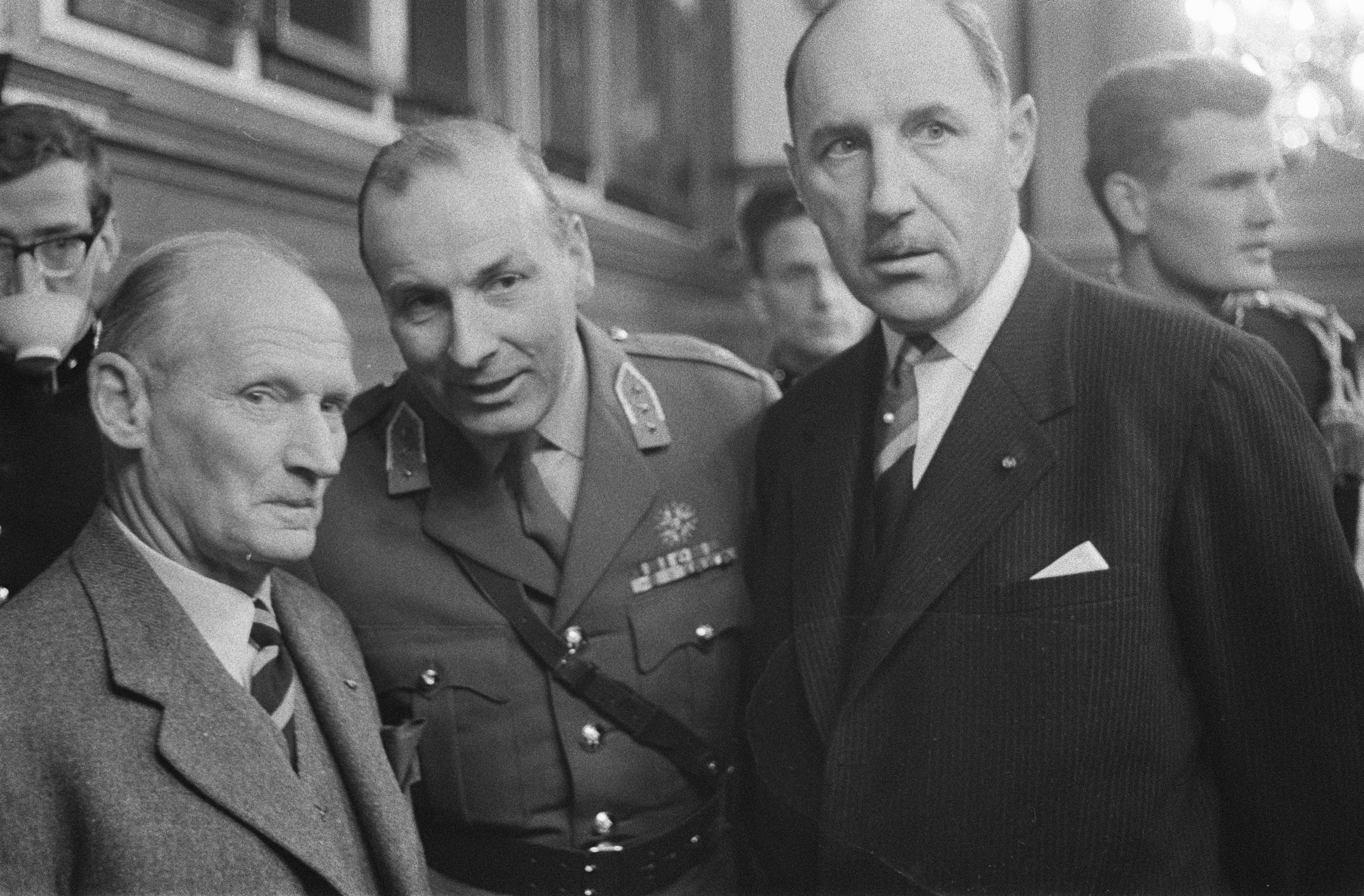
British Field marshal Bernard Montgomery and Minister Joseph Luns at the University of Amsterdam on 9 November 1960.

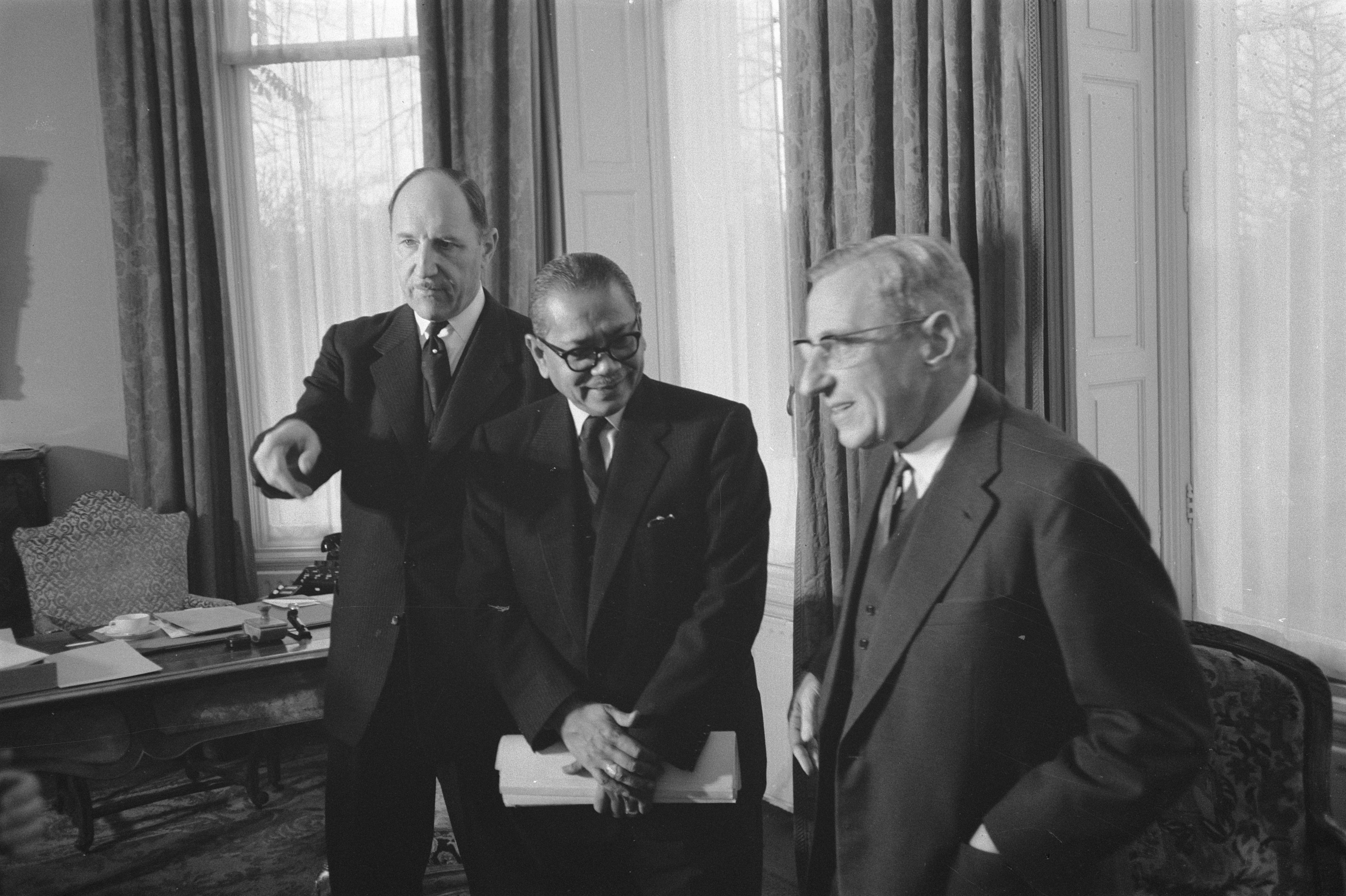
Minister Joseph Luns, Prime Minister of Malaysia Tunku Abdul Rahman and Prime Minister Jan de Quay at Ministry of General Affairs on 25 November 1960.

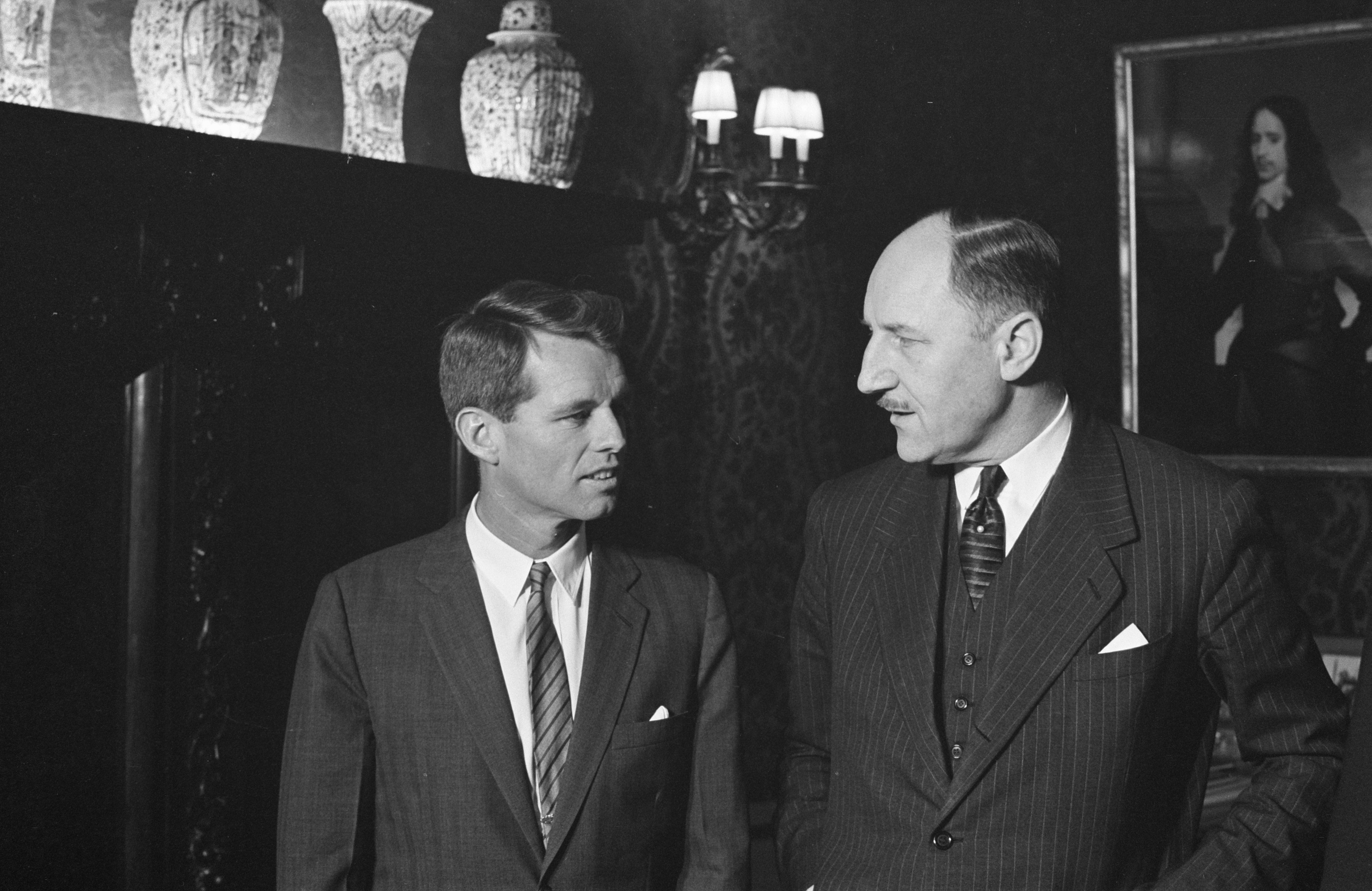
United States Attorney General Robert F. Kennedy and Minister Joseph Luns at the Ministry of General Affairs on 26 February 1962.

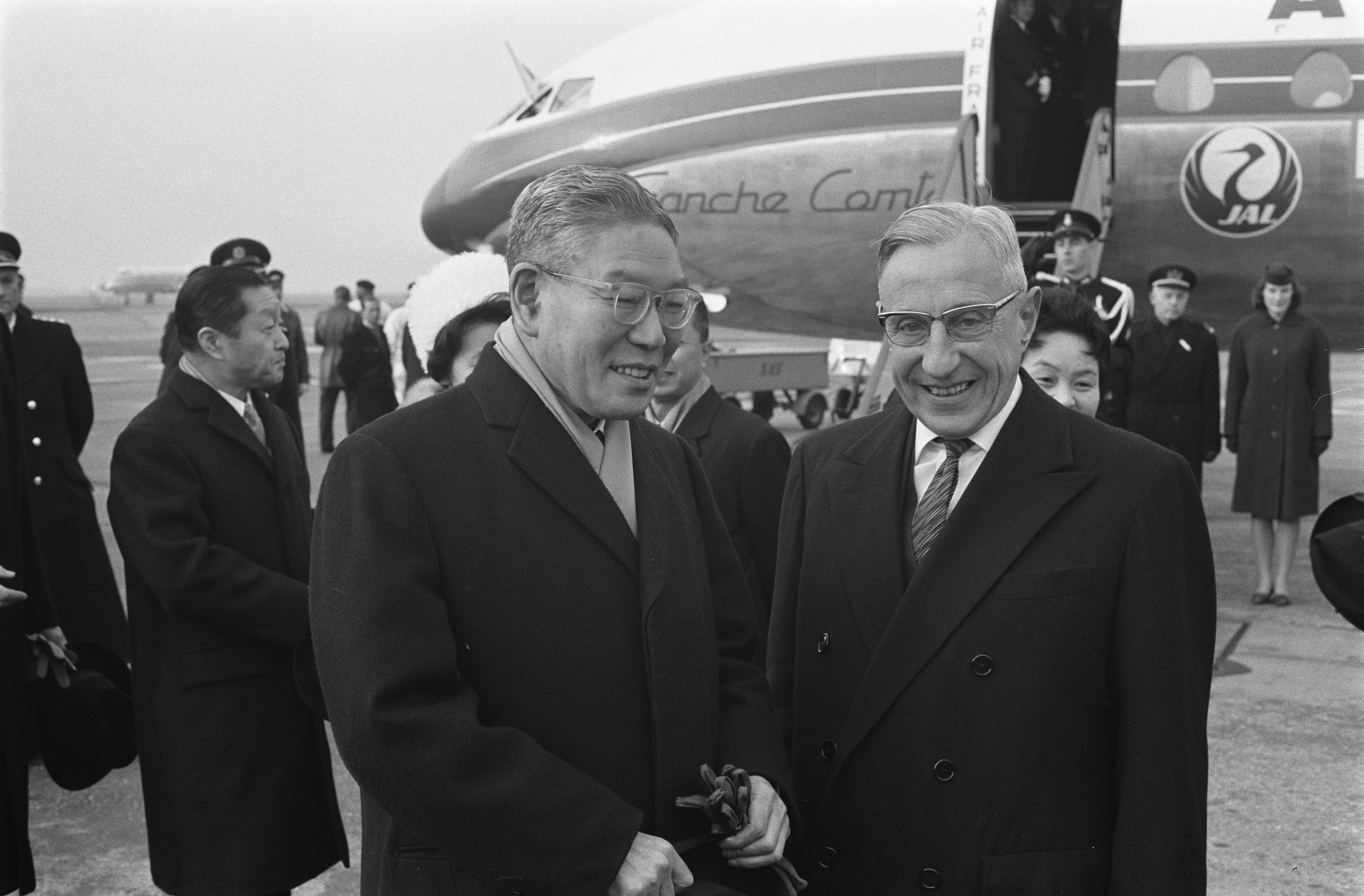
Prime Minister of Japan Hayato Ikeda and Prime Minister Jan de Quay at Airport Schiphol on 21 November 1962.

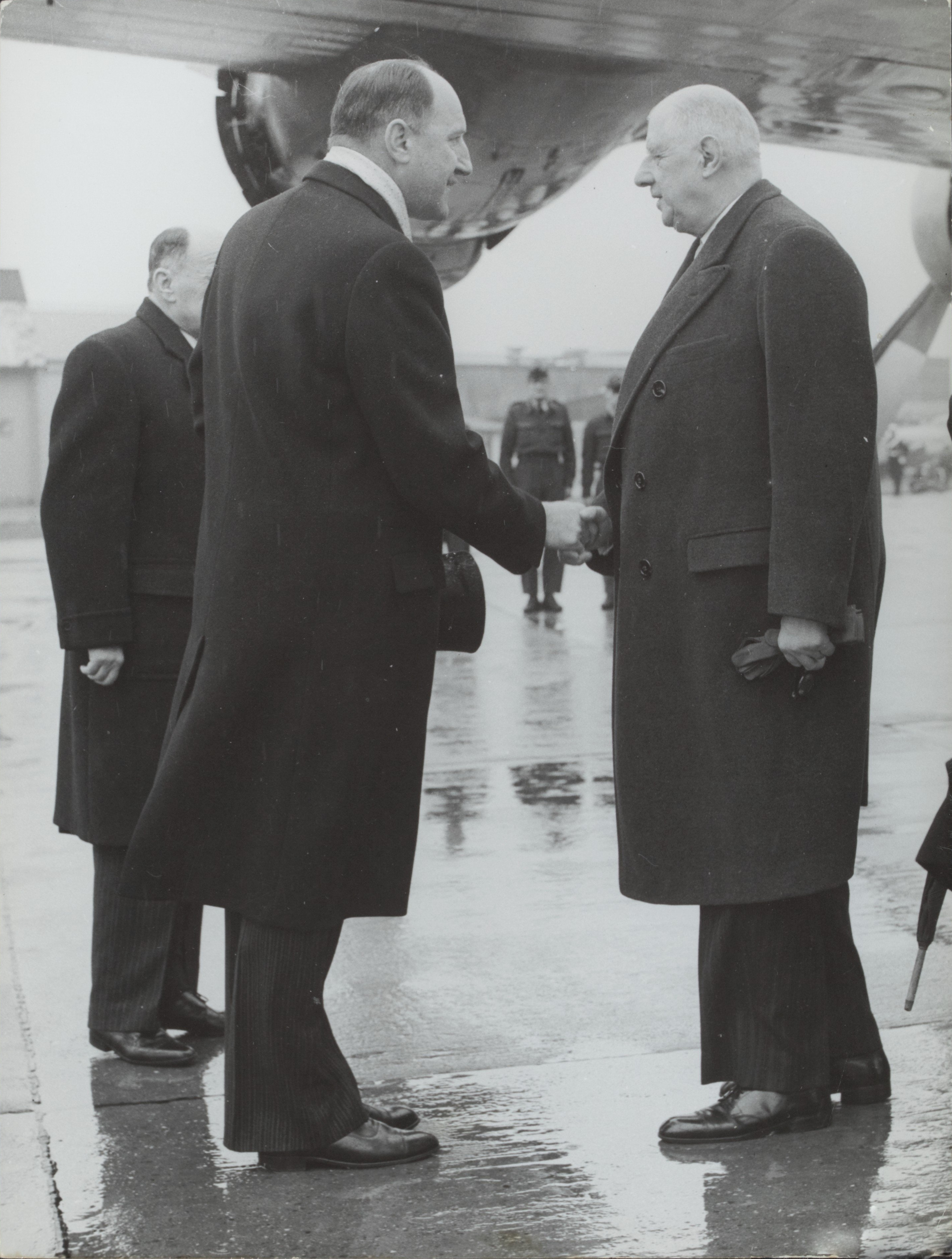
Minister Joseph Luns and President of France Charles de Gaulle at Airport Schiphol on 16 March 1963.

== Cabinet members ==
Ministers		Title/Ministry/Portfolio(s)			Term of office	Party
Jan de Quay	Jan de Quay (1901–1985)	Prime Minister	General Affairs		19 May 1959 – 24 July 1963	Catholic; People's Party
Henk Korthals	Henk Korthals (1911–1976)	Deputy Prime; Minister	Transport and Water Management		19 May 1959 – 24 July 1963	People's Party for Freedom and Democracy
Henk Korthals	Henk Korthals (1911–1976)	Minister	Transport and Water Management		19 May 1959 – 24 July 1963	People's Party for Freedom and Democracy
Henk Korthals	Henk Korthals (1911–1976)	Minister	Interior	• Overseas Affairs	19 May 1959 – 1 September 1959	People's Party for Freedom and Democracy
Henk Korthals	Henk Korthals (1911–1976)	Minister	Interior	• Suriname and Netherlands; Antilles Affairs	1 September 1959 – 24 July 1963	People's Party for Freedom and Democracy
Edzo Toxopeus	Edzo Toxopeus (1918–2009)	Minister	Interior		19 May 1959 – 14 April 1965^{[Continued]}	People's Party for Freedom and Democracy
Joseph Luns	Joseph Luns (1911–2002)	Minister	Foreign Affairs		13 October 1956 – 6 July 1971^{[Retained]} ^{[Continued]}	Catholic; People's Party
Jelle Zijlstra	Jelle Zijlstra (1918–2001)	Minister	Finance		22 December 1958 – 24 July 1963^{[Retained]}	Anti-Revolutionary; Party
Albert Beerman	Albert Beerman (1901–1967)	Minister	Justice		19 May 1959 – 24 July 1963	Christian; Historical Union
Jan de Pous	Jan de Pous (1920–1996)	Minister	Economic Affairs		19 May 1959 – 24 July 1963	Christian; Historical Union
Sidney J. van den Bergh	Major general Sidney J. van den Bergh (1898–1977)	Minister	Defence		19 May 1959 – 1 August 1959^{[Res]}	People's Party for Freedom and Democracy
Jan de Quay	Jan de Quay (1901–1985)	Minister	Defence		1 August 1959 – 4 September 1959^{[Acting]}	Catholic; People's Party
Sim Visser	Sim Visser (1908–1983)	Minister	Defence		4 September 1959 – 24 July 1963	People's Party for Freedom and Democracy
Charles van Rooy	Charles van Rooy (1912–1996)	Minister	Social Affairs and Health		19 May 1959 – 3 July 1961^{[Res]}	Catholic; People's Party
Victor Marijnen	Victor Marijnen (1917–1975)	Minister	Social Affairs and Health		3 July 1961 – 17 July 1961^{[Ad Interim]}	Catholic; People's Party
Gerard Veldkamp	Gerard Veldkamp (1921–1990)	Minister	Social Affairs and Health		17 July 1961 – 5 April 1967^{[Continued]}	Catholic; People's Party
Jo Cals	Jo Cals (1914–1971)	Minister	Education, Arts and Sciences		2 September 1952 – 7 November 1961^{[Retained]} ^{[Note]}	Catholic; People's Party
Marga Klompé	Marga Klompé (1912–1986)	Minister	Education, Arts and Sciences		7 November 1961 – 4 February 1962^{[Acting]}	Catholic; People's Party
Jo Cals	Jo Cals (1914–1971)	Minister	Education, Arts and Sciences		4 February 1962 – 23 April 1963^{[Note]}	Catholic; People's Party
Marga Klompé	Marga Klompé (1912–1986)	Minister	Education, Arts and Sciences		23 April 1963 – 24 July 1963^{[Acting]}	Catholic; People's Party
Victor Marijnen	Victor Marijnen (1917–1975)	Minister	Agriculture and Fisheries		19 May 1959 – 24 July 1963	Catholic; People's Party
Jan van Aartsen	Jan van Aartsen (1909–1992)	Minister	Housing and Construction		19 May 1959 – 24 July 1963	Anti-Revolutionary; Party
Marga Klompé	Marga Klompé (1912–1986)	Minister	Social Work		13 October 1956 – 24 July 1963^{[Retained]}	Catholic; People's Party
State Secretaries		Title/Ministry/Portfolio(s)			Term of office	Party
Norbert Schmelzer	Norbert Schmelzer (1921–2008)	State Secretary	General Affairs	• Social Market; Economy • Public; Organisations	19 May 1959 – 24 July 1963	Catholic; People's Party
Theo Bot	Theo Bot (1911–1984)	State Secretary	Interior	• Netherlands; New Guinea	23 November 1959 – 24 July 1963	Catholic; People's Party
Hans van Houten	Hans van Houten (1907–1996)	State Secretary	Foreign Affairs	• European Union • NATO • Benelux • International; Organizations	24 August 1959 – 24 July 1963	People's Party for Freedom and Democracy
Wim van den Berge	Wim van den Berge (1905–1987)	State Secretary	Finance	• Fiscal Policy • Tax and Customs • Governmental; Budget	27 May 1959 – 14 April 1965^{[Continued]}	Independent
Gerard Veldkamp	Gerard Veldkamp (1921–1990)	State Secretary	Economic Affairs	• Small and Medium-sized; Businesses • Consumer; Protection • Tourism	10 October 1952 – 17 July 1961^{[Retained]} ^{[App]}	Catholic; People's Party
Frans Gijzels	Frans Gijzels (1911–1977)	State Secretary	Economic Affairs	• Small and Medium-sized; Businesses • Consumer; Protection • Tourism	14 September 1961 – 24 July 1963	Catholic; People's Party
Michael Calmeyer	Lieutenant general Michael Calmeyer (1895–1990)	State Secretary	Defence	• Army • Air Force	19 June 1959 – 24 July 1963	Christian; Historical Union
Piet de Jong	Captain; Piet de Jong (1915–2016)	State Secretary	Defence	• Navy	25 June 1959 – 24 July 1963	Catholic; People's Party
Bauke Roolvink	Bauke Roolvink (1912–1979)	State Secretary	Social Affairs and Health	• Social Security • Unemployment • Occupational; Safety • Social Services	15 June 1959 – 24 July 1963	Anti-Revolutionary; Party
Gerard Stubenrouch	Gerard; Stubenrouch (1918–1962)	State Secretary	Education, Arts and Sciences	• Primary; Education • Secondary; Education	16 June 1959 – 22 April 1962^{[Died]}	Catholic; People's Party
Harry Janssen	Harry Janssen (1910–1982)	State Secretary	Education, Arts and Sciences	• Primary; Education • Secondary; Education	4 June 1962 – 24 July 1963	Catholic; People's Party
Ynso Scholten	Ynso Scholten (1918–1984)	State Secretary	Education, Arts and Sciences	• Youth Care • Nature • Media • Culture • Art • Recreation • Sport	16 June 1959 – 24 July 1963	Christian; Historical Union
Eddie Stijkel	Eddie Stijkel (1918–1982)	State Secretary	Transport and Water Management	• Public; Transport • Aviation • Rail Transport • Water; Management	15 October 1959 – 24 July 1963	People's Party for Freedom and Democracy

^{Resigned}
^{Retained from the previous cabinet}
^{Continued in the next cabinet}
^{Acting}
^{Ad Interim}
^{Died in Office}
^{Medical leave of absence from 7 November 1961 until 4 February 1962 and from 23 April 1963}
^{Appointed as Minister of Social Affairs and Health}

== Trivia ==
- The age difference between oldest cabinet member Michael Calmeyer (born 1895) and the youngest cabinet member Gerard Veldkamp (born 1921) was 26 years, 10 days.
- Six cabinet members had previous experience as scholars and professors: Jan de Quay (Applied Psychology and Business Theory), Jelle Zijlstra (Public Economics), Jan de Pous (Public Economics), Gerard Veldkamp (Microeconomics), Willem Hendrik van den Berge (Public Economics) and Harry Janssen (Latin).
- Four cabinet members (later) served as Prime Minister: Victor Marijnen (1963–1965), Jo Cals (1965–1966), Jelle Zijlstra (1966–1967), and Piet de Jong (1967–1971).
- Four cabinet members (later) served as Queen's Commissioners: Jan de Quay (North-Brabant), Edzo Toxopeus (Groningen), Charles van Rooy (Limburg) and Jan van Aartsen (Zeeland).
- The sons of Ministers Henk Korthals (Benk) and Jan van Aartsen (Jozias) would later serve together as Ministers in the Second Kok cabinet 35 years later.
