= Josef van Schaik =

Dutch politician (1882–1962)

His Excellency Josef van Schaik
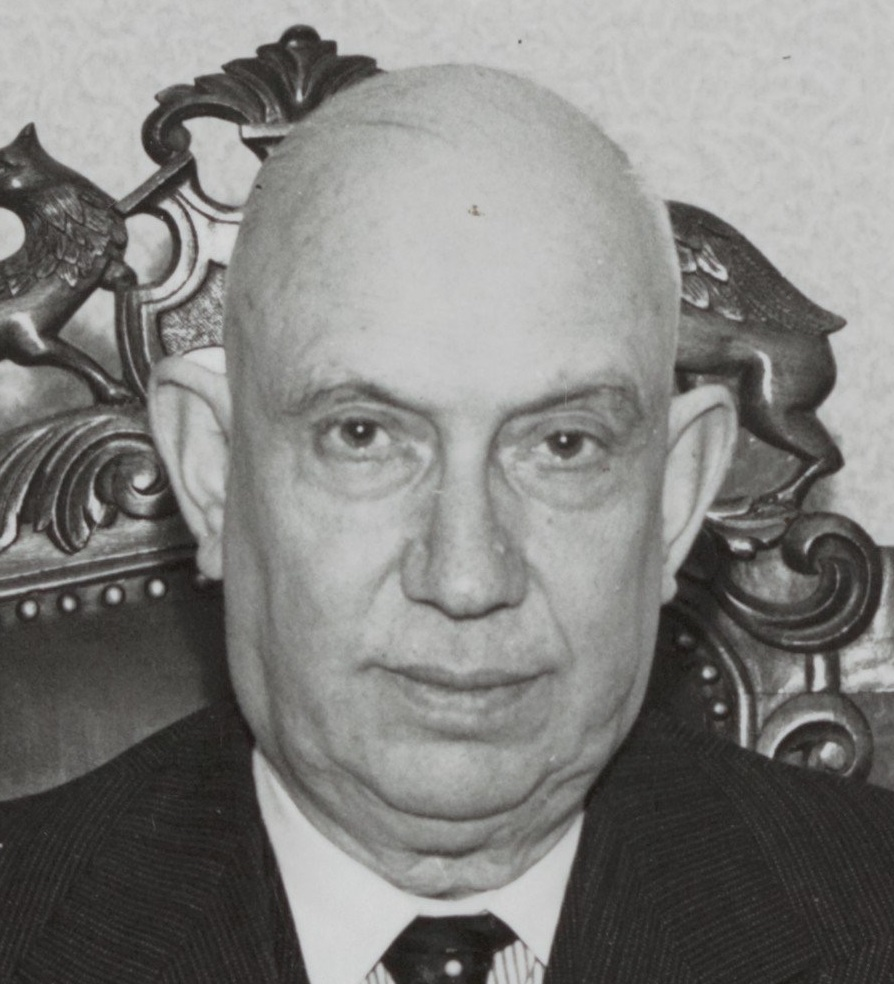
- Van Schaik in 1951

Member of the Council of State
- In office 1 June 1951 – 1 February 1957
- Vice President: Frans Beelaerts van Blokland (1951–1956); Bram Rutgers (1956–1957)

Minister of the Interior
- In office 15 June 1949 – 20 September 1949; Ad interim
- Prime Minister: Willem Drees
- Preceded by: Johan van Maarseveen
- Succeeded by: Frans Teulings

Deputy Prime Minister of the Netherlands
- In office 7 August 1948 – 15 March 1951
- Prime Minister: Willem Drees
- Preceded by: Willem Drees
- Succeeded by: Frans Teulings

Minister of Transport and Water Management
- In office 7 August 1948 – 1 November 1948; Ad interim
- Prime Minister: Willem Drees
- Preceded by: Hein Vos
- Succeeded by: Derk Spitzen

Minister for Constitutional Reform
- In office 7 August 1948 – 15 March 1951
- Prime Minister: Willem Drees
- Preceded by: Office established
- Succeeded by: Office discontinued

Parliamentary leader in the House of Representatives
- In office 9 June 1937 – 11 November 1937
- Preceded by: Carel Goseling
- Succeeded by: Laurent Deckers
- Parliamentary group: Roman Catholic State Party

Deputy Prime Minister of the Netherlands
- In office 7 August 1948 – 15 March 1951
- Prime Minister: Willem Drees
- Preceded by: Willem Drees
- Succeeded by: Frans Teulings

Minister of Justice
- In office 26 May 1933 – 24 June 1937
- Prime Minister: Hendrikus Colijn
- Preceded by: Jan Donner
- Succeeded by: Carel Goseling

Speaker of the House of Representatives
- In office 11 November 1937 – 7 August 1948
- Preceded by: Piet Aalberse Sr.
- Succeeded by: Rad Kortenhorst
- In office 18 September 1929 – 26 May 1933
- Preceded by: Charles Ruijs de Beerenbrouck
- Succeeded by: Charles Ruijs de Beerenbrouck

Member of the House of Representatives
- In office 8 June 1937 – 7 August 1948
- In office 20 February 1917 – 1 June 1933

Personal details
- Born: Josephus Robertus Hendricus van Schaik; 31 January 1882 Breda, Netherlands
- Died: 23 March 1962 (aged 80) The Hague, Netherlands
- Party: Catholic People's Party (from 1945)
- Other political affiliations: Roman Catholic State Party (1926–1945); General League (1910–1926)
- Spouse: Maria Brouwers (m. 1913)
- Relations: Steef van Schaik (brother)
- Children: Virginia van Schaik (1914–1987); Johannes van Schaik (1917–1991); Maria van Schaik (1919–1999); 1 other son and 1 other daughter
- Education: Utrecht University (Bachelor of Laws, Master of Laws)
- Occupation: Politician · civil servant · jurist · lawyer · judge · prosecutor · nonprofit director · academic administrator · lobbyist

Josephus Robertus Hendricus "Josef" van Schaik (31 January 1882 – 23 March 1962) was a Dutch politician of the Roman Catholic State Party (RKSP) and later co-founder of the Catholic People's Party (KVP) and jurist. He was granted the honorary title of Minister of State on 15 March 1951.

Van Schaik worked as a teacher at a middle school in Arnhem from 1905 until 1906. He worked as a lawyer and prosecutor in Arnhem from 1906 until 1919, served as a judge at the court of Arnhem from 1910 until 1919, and worked as a lawyer and prosecutor in The Hague from 1919 until 1933.

Van Schaik became a member of the House of Representatives after the death of Joseph van Nispen tot Sevenaer, taking office on 20 February 1917. After the 1929 general election, Van Schaik was elected as Speaker of the House of Representatives, taking office on 18 September 1929. Following the 1933 general election, Van Schaik was appointed as Minister of Justice in the Colijn II cabinet, taking office on 26 May 1933. The cabinet fell just two years later on 23 July 1935 and was replaced by the Colijn III cabinet, with Van Schaik continuing as Minister of Justice, taking office on 31 July 1935. After the 1937 general election, Van Schaik returned to the House of Representatives and became the parliamentary leader of the Roman Catholic State Party on 9 June 1937. The Colijn III cabinet was replaced by the Colijn IV cabinet on 24 June 1937. Van Schaik was re-elected as Speaker of the House of Representatives following the appointment of Piet Aalberse Sr. to the Council of State, taking office on 11 November 1937. During World War II, Van Schaik continued to serve as the de jure Speaker of the House of Representatives, but in reality his political influence was marginalized and he spent most of the German occupation secluded.

Following the end of World War II, Queen Wilhelmina ordered a Recall of Parliament. Van Schaik remained in the House of Representatives and was again re-elected as Speaker of the House of Representatives. On 22 December 1945 the Roman Catholic State Party was renamed as the Catholic People's Party. Van Schaik was one of the co-founders. For the 1948 general election Van Schaik was one of the lead candidates of the Catholic People's Party. The Catholic People's Party held all of its seats and remained the largest party with 32 seats in the House of Representatives. The following cabinet formation resulted in a coalition agreement between the Catholic People's Party, the Labour Party (PvdA), the Christian Historical Union (CHU) and the People's Party for Freedom and Democracy (VVD), which formed the Drees–Van Schaik cabinet, with Van Schaik appointed as Deputy Prime Minister and Minister for Constitutional Reform, taking office on 7 August 1948. Van Schaik served as acting Minister of Transport and Water Management from 7 August 1948 until 1 November 1948, until the installation of Derk Spitzen. Van Schaik also served as acting Minister of the Interior from 15 June 1949 until 20 September 1949 following the appointment of Johan van Maarseveen as Minister of Colonial Affairs. The Drees–Van Schaik cabinet fell on 24 January 1951, and shortly thereafter Van Schaik, per his request, was not considered for a ministerial post in the new cabinet. He left office upon the installation of the Drees I cabinet on 15 March 1951.

Van Schaik remained active in politics. He was nominated as a member of the Council of State, serving from 1 June 1951 until 1 February 1957 and served as Chairman of the Van Schaik Commission, a state commission that was tasked with constitutional reforms and decolonization, serving from 17 April 1950 until 15 January 1954. He also served on several state commissions on behalf of the government. Following the end of his active political career, he remained active as an advocate and lobbyist for small and medium-sized enterprises.

Van Schaik was known for his abilities as a consensus builder and negotiator. He continued to comment on political affairs as an elder statesman until his death.

== Decorations ==
Honours
| Ribbon bar | Honour | Country | Date | Comment |
|---|---|---|---|---|
| | Knight of the Order of the Holy Sepulchre | Holy See | 1 May 1931 | |
| | Grand Cross of the Order of the Crown | Belgium | 29 Augustus 1936 | |
| | Commander of the Order of the Netherlands Lion | Netherlands | 30 July 1937 | |
| | Grand Cross of the Order of the Oak Crown | Luxembourg | 10 August 1946 | |
| | Grand Cross of the Legion of Honour | France | 5 June 1950 | |
| | Knight Grand Cross of the Order of St. Gregory the Great | Holy See | 31 January 1952 | |
| | Knight Grand Cross of the Order of Orange-Nassau | Netherlands | 30 April 1954 | Elevated from Grand Officer (15 March 1951) |

Honorific titles
| Ribbon bar | Honour | Country | Date | Comment |
|---|---|---|---|---|
| | Minister of State | Netherlands | 15 March 1951 | Style of Excellency |

Party political offices
| Preceded by Carel Goseling | Parliamentary leader of the Roman Catholic State Party in the House of Representatives; 1937 | Succeeded by Laurent Deckers |
Political offices
| Preceded by Charles Ruijs de Beerenbrouck | Speaker of the House of Representatives; 1929–1933; 1937–1948 | Succeeded by Charles Ruijs de Beerenbrouck |
| Preceded by Piet Aalberse Sr. | Speaker of the House of Representatives; 1929–1933; 1937–1948 | Succeeded by Rad Kortenhorst |
| Preceded by Jan Donner | Minister of Justice; 1933–1937 | Succeeded by Carel Goseling |
| Preceded by Willem Drees | Deputy Prime Minister; 1948–1951 | Succeeded by Frans Teulings |
| New office | Minister for Constitutional Reform; 1948–1951 | Office discontinued |
| Preceded by Hein Vos | Minister of Transport and Water Management; Ad interim 1948 | Succeeded by Derk Spitzen |
| Preceded by Johan van Maarseveen | Minister of the Interior; Ad interim 1949 | Succeeded by Frans Teulings |
Civic offices
| Preceded by Wiel Nolens | Chairman of the Mine Council; 1932–1933 | Succeeded by Charles Ruijs de Beerenbrouck |
