= Johan van Maarseveen =

Dutch politician

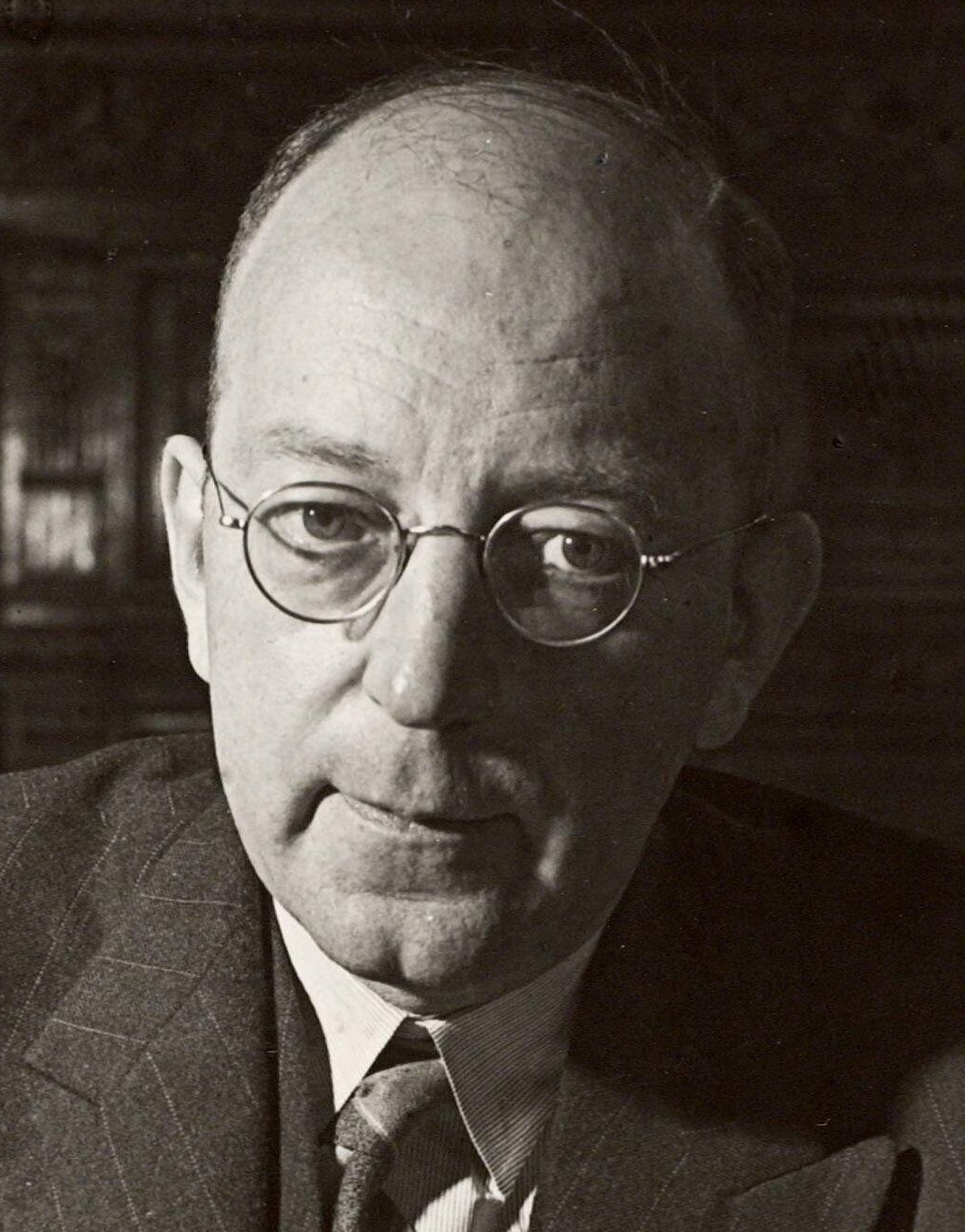
- Van Maarseveen in 1950

Minister of Colonial Affairs
- In office 14 February 1949 – 15 March 1951
- Prime Minister: Willem Drees
- Preceded by: Maan Sassen
- Succeeded by: Willem Drees (ad interim)

Minister of the Interior
- In office 15 March 1951 – 18 November 1951
- Prime Minister: Willem Drees
- Preceded by: Frans Teulings
- Succeeded by: Frans Teulings (ad interim)
- In office 7 August 1948 – 15 June 1949
- Prime Minister: Willem Drees
- Preceded by: Piet Witteman
- Succeeded by: Josef van Schaik (ad interim)

Minister of Justice
- In office 15 May 1950 – 10 July 1950; Ad interim
- Prime Minister: Willem Drees
- Preceded by: René Wijers
- Succeeded by: Teun Struycken
- In office 3 July 1946 – 7 August 1948
- Prime Minister: Louis Beel
- Preceded by: Hans Kolfschoten
- Succeeded by: René Wijers

Member of the House of Representatives
- In office 27 July 1948 – 10 August 1948
- In office 21 September 1937 – 3 July 1946

Personal details
- Born: Johannes Henricus van Maarseveen; 3 August 1894 Utrecht, Netherlands
- Died: 18 November 1951 (aged 57) Utrecht, Netherlands
- Party: Catholic People's Party (from 1945)
- Other political affiliations: Roman Catholic State Party (until 1945)
- Spouse: Henrica Spierings (m. 1923)
- Children: 5 sons and 5 daughters
- Education: Utrecht University
- Occupation: Politician · Jurist · Lawyer · Prosecutor

Johannes Henricus "Johan" van Maarseveen (3 August 1894 – 18 November 1951) was a Dutch politician of the Roman Catholic State Party (RKSP) and later the Catholic People's Party (KVP) and jurist.

== Early years ==
Van Maarseveen applied at the Utrecht University in June 1914 majoring in Law and obtaining a Bachelor of Laws degree in July 1916 before graduating with a Master of Laws degree in July 1920.

== Career ==
Van Maarseveen worked as a lawyer and prosecutor in Utrecht from August 1920 until September 1937. Van Maarseveen served on the municipal council of Utrecht from May 1929 until September 1937 and served as an Alderman in Utrecht from September 1935 until March 1937. Van Maarseveen became a member of the House of Representatives following the appointment of Carel Goseling as Minister of Justice in the Colijn IV cabinet, taking office on 21 September 1937. On 10 May 1940 Nazi Germany invaded the Netherlands and the government fled to London to escape the German occupation. During World War II Van Maarseveen continued to serve as a member of the House of Representatives but in reality the de facto political influence of the House of Representatives was marginalized. Following the end of the War, Queen Wilhelmina ordered a Recall of Parliament and Van Maarseveen remained a member of the House of Representatives, taking office on 20 November 1945. On 22 December 1945 the Roman Catholic State Party was renamed as the Catholic People's Party.

After the election of 1946 Van Maarseveen was appointed as Minister of Justice in the Beel I cabinet, taking office on 3 July 1946. After the election of 1948 Van Maarseveen returned to the House of Representatives, taking office on 27 July 1948. Following the cabinet formation of 1948 Van Maarseveen was appointed as Minister of the Interior in the Drees–Van Schaik cabinet, taking office on 7 August 1948. Van Maarseveen was appointed as Minister of Colonial Affairs following the resignation Maan Sassen, taking office on 14 February 1949. Van Maarseveen served as acting Minister of Justice from 15 May 1950 until 10 July 1950 following the resignation of René Wijers. The Cabinet Drees–Van Schaik fell on 24 January 1951 and continued to serve in a demissionary capacity until the cabinet formation of 1951 when it was replaced by Drees I cabinet with Van Maarseveen appointed again as Minister of the Interior, taking office on 15 March 1951.

== Death ==
On 18 November 1951 Van Maarseveen died after suffering a fatal heart Attack at his home in Utrecht.

== Decorations ==
Honours
Ribbon bar	Honour	Country	Date	Comment
	Commander of the Order of Orange-Nassau	Netherlands	15 March 1951	

Political offices
Preceded by Hans Kolfschoten	Minister of Justice; 1946–1948; Ad interim	Succeeded by René Wijers
Preceded by Piet Witteman	Minister of the Interior; 1948–1949	Succeeded by Josef van Schaik; Ad interim
Preceded by Maan Sassen	Minister of Colonial Affairs; 1949–1951	Succeeded by Willem Drees; Ad interim
Preceded by René Wijers	Minister of Justice; 1950; Ad interim	Succeeded by Teun Struycken
Preceded by Frans Teulings	Minister of the Interior; 1951	Succeeded by Frans Teulings; Ad interim
