= Henk Mulderije =

Dutch politician

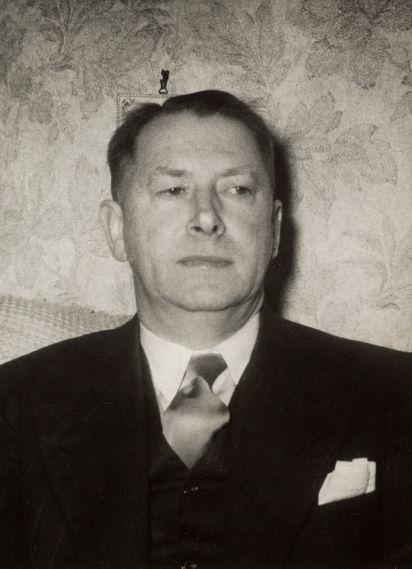
- Mulderije in 1951

Minister of Justice
- In office 15 March 1951 – 2 September 1952
- Prime Minister: Willem Drees
- Preceded by: Teun Struycken
- Succeeded by: Leen Donker

Personal details
- Born: Hendrik Mulderije; 4 January 1896 Zutphen, Netherlands
- Died: 18 March 1970 (aged 74) Amsterdam, Netherlands
- Party: Christian Historical Union (from 1929)
- Education: Utrecht University (Bachelor of Laws, Master of Laws)
- Occupation: Politician; Jurist; Lawyer; Prosecutor; Judge

Hendrik "Henk" Mulderije (4 January 1896 – 18 March 1970) was a Dutch politician of the Christian Historical Union (CHU). He served as Minister of Justice in the First Drees cabinet from 1951 to 1952.
