= Drees–Van Schaik cabinet =

Cabinet of the Netherlands, 1948 to 1951

Drees–Van Schaik cabinet First Drees cabinet
- Cabinet of the Netherlands

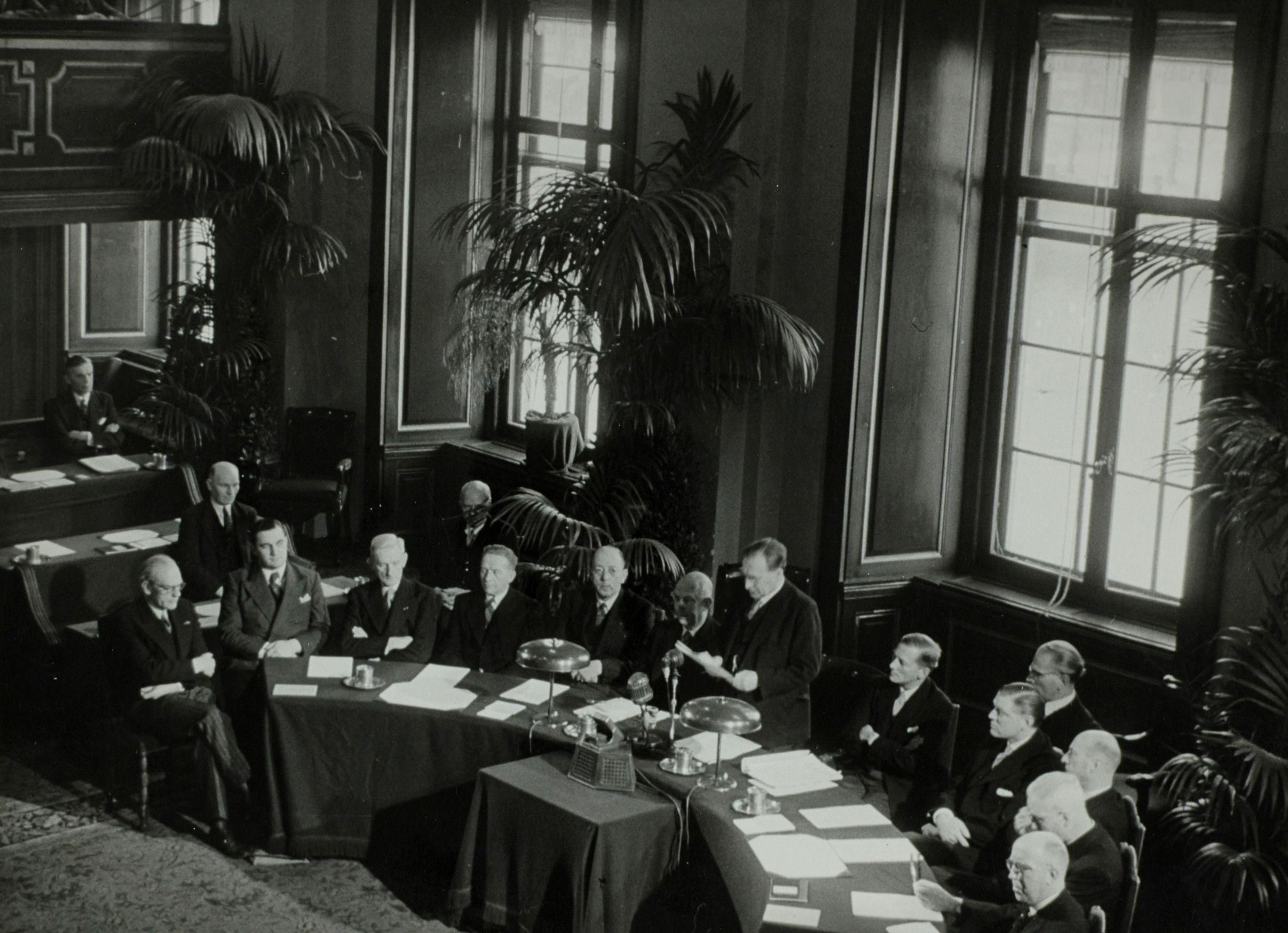
- The members of the Drees–Van Schaik cabinet in the House of Representatives on 10 December 1948
- Date formed: 7 August 1948
- Date dissolved: 15 March 1951; 2 years, 220 days in office (Demissionary from 24 January 1951)

People and organisations
- Head of state: Queen Wilhelmina (1948); Queen Juliana (1948–1951)
- Head of government: Willem Drees
- Deputy head of government: Josef van Schaik
- No. of ministers: 15
- Ministers removed: 3
- Total no. of members: 18
- Member party: Catholic People's Party (KVP); Labour Party (PvdA); Christian Historical Union (CHU); People's Party for Freedom and Democracy (VVD)
- Status in legislature: Centre-left; Majority government (Grand coalition/Roman-Red)

History
- Incoming formation: 1948 formation
- Outgoing formation: 1951 formation
- Election: 1948 election
- Legislature terms: 1948–1952
- Predecessor: First Beel cabinet
- Successor: First Drees cabinet

The Drees–Van Schaik cabinet, also called the First Drees cabinet (Note: According to a different numbering this was the First Drees cabinet because it was the first cabinet with Willem Drees as Prime Minister.) was the cabinet of the Netherlands from 7 August 1948 until 15 March 1951. The cabinet was formed by the Catholic People's Party (KVP), the Labour Party (PvdA), the Christian Historical Union (CHU) and the People's Party for Freedom and Democracy (VVD) after the 1948 general election. The cabinet was a centre-left grand coalition and had a substantial majority in the House of Representatives with Labour Leader Willem Drees serving as Prime Minister. Prominent KVP politician Josef van Schaik, a former Minister of Justice, served as Deputy Prime Minister and Minister without portfolio for the Interior.

The cabinet served during final years of the post-war 1940s and the first years of the turbulent 1950s. Domestically the beginning of the recovery and rebuilding following World War II started with the Marshall Plan, it was also to implement several major social reforms to social security, welfare, child benefits and education. Internationally the beginning of the decolonisation of the Dutch East Indies started following the Indonesian National Revolution and the forming of the Netherlands New Guinea following the West New Guinea dispute. The cabinet suffered several major internal and external conflicts including multiple cabinet resignations, the cabinet fell 29 months into its term on 24 January 1951 following a disagreement in the coalition over the handling of the New Guinea policy and the cabinet continued in a demissionary capacity until it was replaced with the First Drees cabinet on 15 March 1951.

Commenting on divisions within the cabinet, one study has noted that "In spite of the centre-left coloration of the Drees-van Schaik cabinet, ideological differences between Socialists and Catholics prevented the rapid expansion of the welfare state."

== Term ==
This coalition had a 76% representation in the second chamber of parliament. It had to have a broad basis for the change in constitution that was required to make the Dutch East Indies independent, resulting in the new country Indonesia (in December 1949). In 1948 a second Police Action was embarked upon, but ended under international pressure. The rejection of a VVD motion over New Guinea in 1951 led to the fall of the cabinet. However, no elections were held and a new cabinet was formed with the same parties, Drees I.

In 1949, the Netherlands entered the NATO. In the same year several alterations of the German border took place.

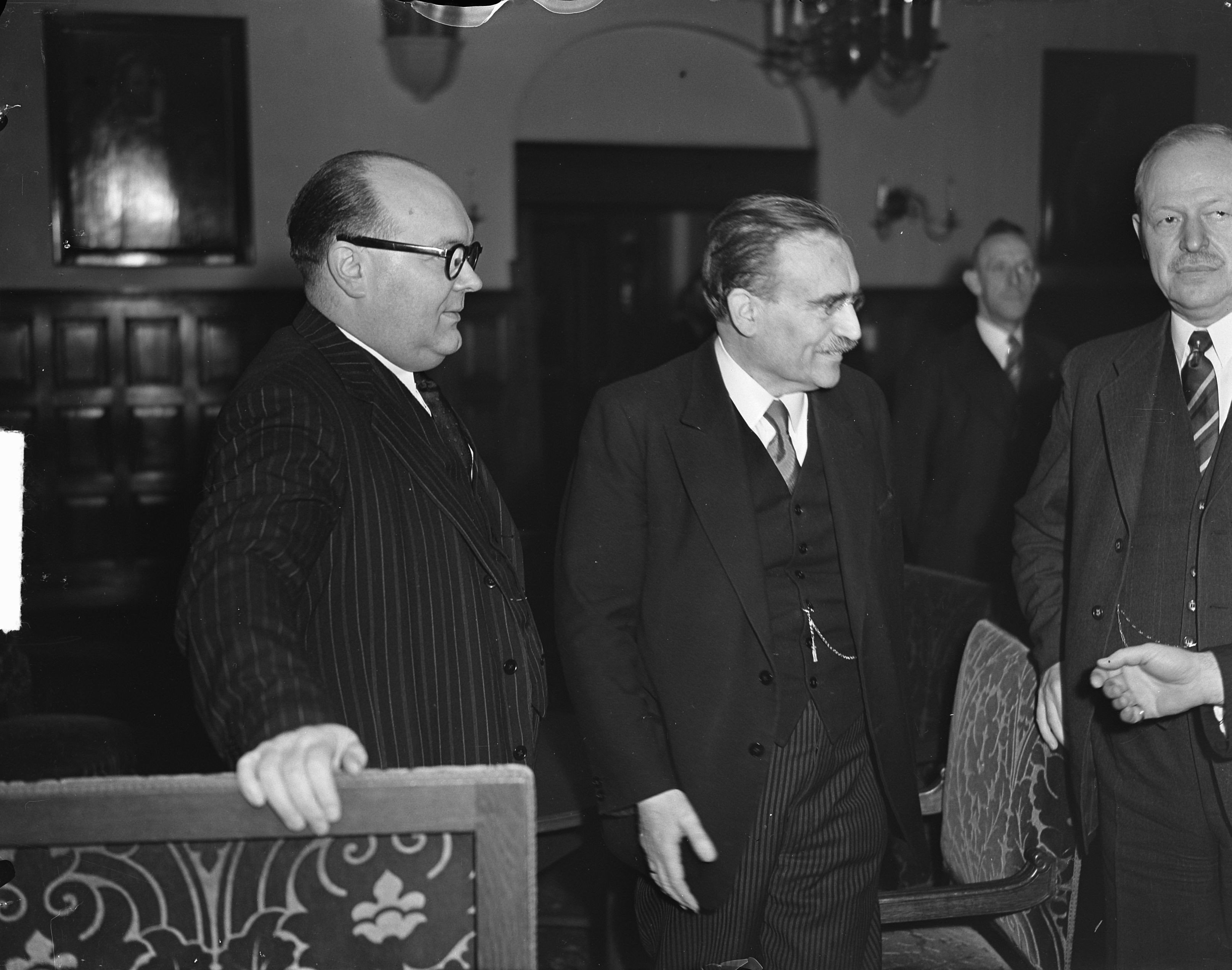
Prime Minister of Belgium Paul-Henri Spaak and Prime Minister Willem Drees at a Benelux conference in The Hague on 10 March 1949

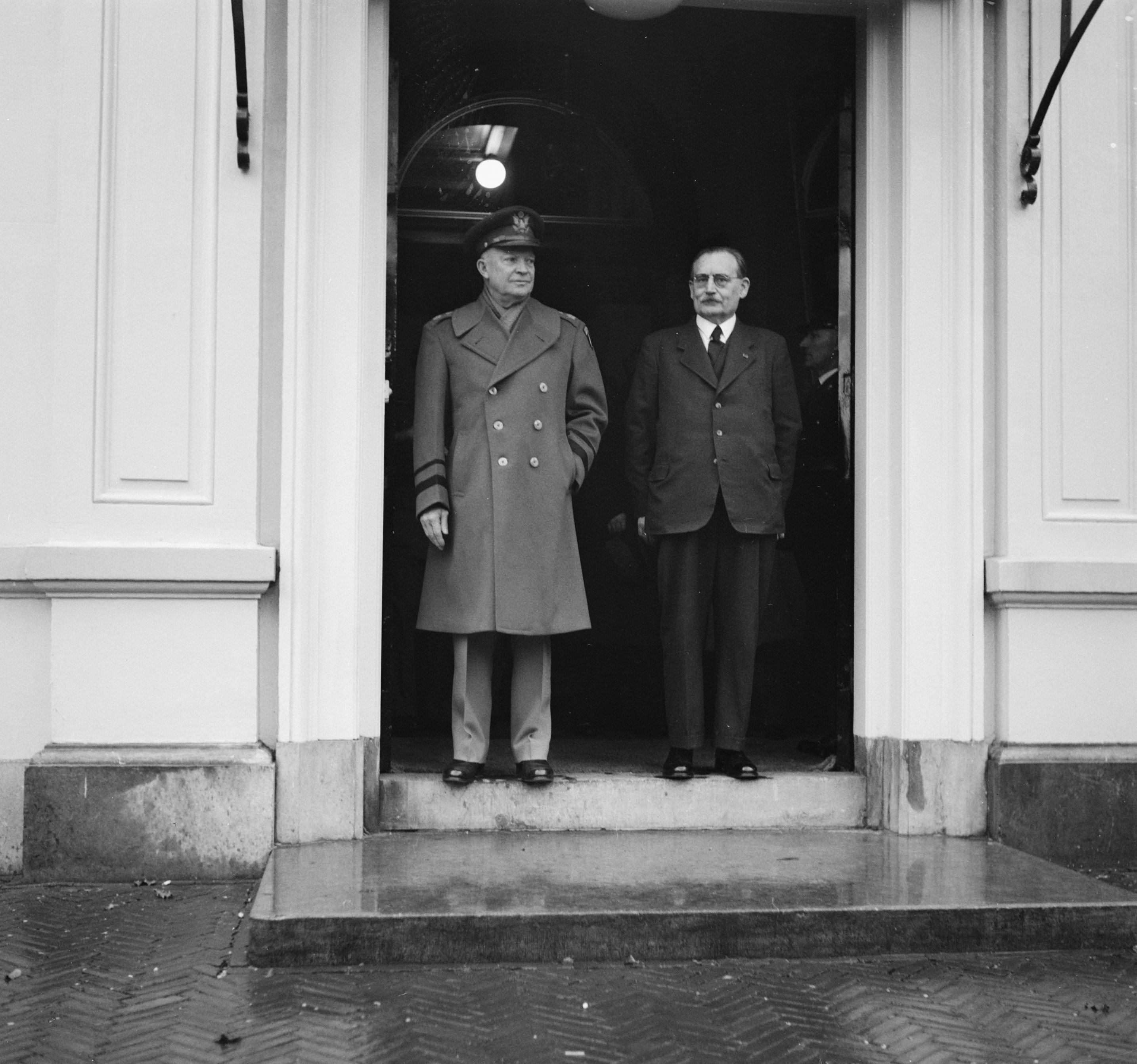
Supreme Allied Commander Europe General Dwight D. Eisenhower and Prime Minister Willem Drees at the Ministry of Defence on 11 January 1951

== Composition ==
=== Ministers ===
Title	Minister			Term of office	
Title	Image	Name	Party	Start	End
Prime Minister; Minister of General Affairs	Willem Drees	Willem Drees	PvdA	7 August 1948	15 March 1951
Minister without Portfolio	Josef van Schaik	Josef van Schaik	KVP	7 August 1948	15 March 1951
Minister of Foreign Affairs	Dirk Stikker	Dirk Stikker	VVD	7 August 1948	15 March 1951
Minister of Justice	René Wijers	René Wijers	KVP	7 August 1948	15 May 1950
Minister of Justice	Johan van Maarseveen	Johan van Maarseveen (ad interim)	KVP	15 May 1950	10 July 1950
Minister of Justice	Teun Struycken	Teun Struycken	KVP	10 July 1950	15 March 1951
Minister of the Interior	Johan van Maarseveen	Johan van Maarseveen	KVP	7 August 1948	15 June 1949
Minister of the Interior	Josef van Schaik	Josef van Schaik (ad interim)	KVP	15 June 1949	20 September 1949
Minister of the Interior	Frans Teulings	Frans Teulings	KVP	20 September 1949	15 March 1951
Minister of Education, Arts and Sciences	Theo Rutten	Theo Rutten	KVP	7 August 1948	15 March 1951
Minister of Finance	Piet Lieftinck	Piet Lieftinck	PvdA	7 August 1948	15 March 1951
Minister of War; Minister of the Navy	Wim Schokking	Wim Schokking	CHU	7 August 1948	16 October 1950
Minister of War; Minister of the Navy	Hans s'Jacob	Hans s'Jacob	Indep.	16 October 1950	15 March 1951
Minister of Reconstruction and Housing	Joris in 't Veld	Joris in 't Veld	PvdA	7 August 1948	15 March 1951
Minister of Transport and Water Management	Josef van Schaik	Josef van Schaik (ad interim)	KVP	7 August 1948	1 November 1948
Minister of Transport and Water Management	Derk Spitzen	Derk Spitzen	Indep.	1 November 1948	15 March 1951
Minister of Economic Affairs	Jan van den Brink	Jan van den Brink	KVP	7 August 1948	15 March 1951
Minister of Agriculture, Fisheries and Food Supplies	Sicco Mansholt	Sicco Mansholt	PvdA	7 August 1948	15 March 1951
Minister of Social Affairs	Dolf Joekes	Dolf Joekes	PvdA	7 August 1948	15 March 1951
Minister of Overseas Territories	Maan Sassen	Maan Sassen	KVP	7 August 1948	14 February 1949
Minister of Overseas Territories	Johan van Maarseveen	Johan van Maarseveen (ad interim)	KVP	14 February 1949	15 March 1951
Minister without Portfolio	Lubbertus Götzen	Lubbertus Götzen	Indep.	7 August 1948	15 March 1951

=== State secretaries ===
Title	State secretary			Term of office	
Title	Image	Name	Party	Start	End
State Secretary of Foreign Affairs	Nico Blom	Nico Blom	Indep.	16 February 1950	15 March 1951
State Secretary of Education, Arts and Sciences	Jo Cals	Jo Cals	KVP	15 March 1950	15 March 1951
State Secretary of War	Wim Fockema Andreae	Wim Fockema Andreae	VVD	1 May 1949	27 November 1950
State Secretary of War	Harry Moorman	Harry Moorman	KVP	27 November 1950	15 March 1951
State Secretary of the Navy	Harry Moorman	Harry Moorman	KVP	1 May 1949	15 March 1951
State Secretary of Economic Affairs	Wim van der Grinten	Wim van der Grinten	KVP	29 January 1949	15 March 1951
State Secretary of Social Affairs	Aat van Rhijn	Aat van Rhijn	PvdA	15 February 1950	15 March 1951
State Secretary of Social Affairs	Piet Muntendam	Piet Muntendam	PvdA	1 April 1950	15 March 1951
