= Drees cabinet =

Drees cabinet may refer to:

- Schermerhorn–Drees cabinet, a Dutch cabinet (1945–1946)
- First Drees cabinet, a Dutch cabinet (1951–1952)
- Second Drees cabinet, a Dutch cabinet (1952–1956)
- Third Drees cabinet, a Dutch cabinet (1956–1958)
