= Frans Teulings =

Dutch politician (1891–1966)

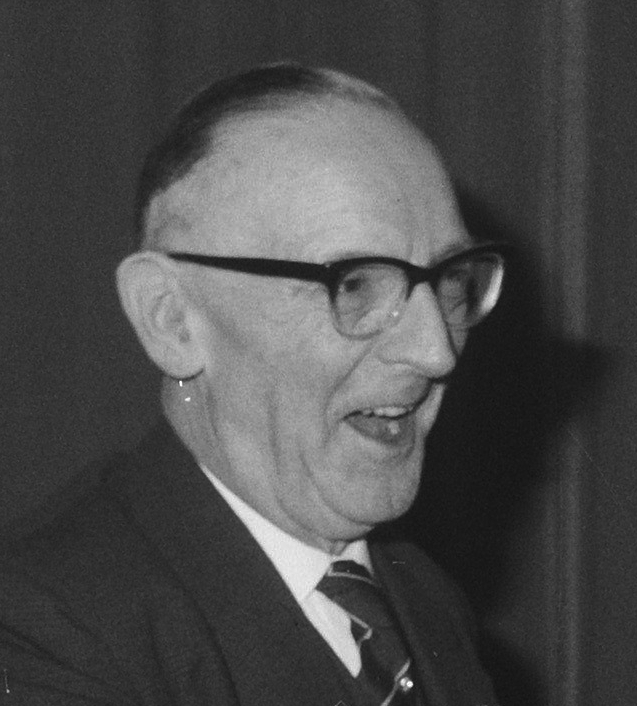
- Teulings in 1961

Deputy Prime Minister of the Netherlands
- In office 15 March 1951 – 2 September 1952
- Prime Minister: Willem Drees
- Preceded by: Josef van Schaik
- Succeeded by: Louis Beel

Minister for Civil Defence
- In office 15 March 1951 – 2 September 1952
- Prime Minister: Willem Drees
- Preceded by: Office established
- Succeeded by: Office discontinued

Minister of the Interior
- In office 18 November 1951 – 6 December 1951; Ad interim
- Prime Minister: Willem Drees
- Preceded by: Johan van Maarseveen
- Succeeded by: Louis Beel
- In office 20 September 1949 – 15 March 1951
- Prime Minister: Willem Drees
- Preceded by: Josef van Schaik (ad interim)
- Succeeded by: Johan van Maarseveen

Member of the Senate
- In office 15 July 1952 – 3 May 1957
- In office 27 July 1948 – 20 September 1949

Parliamentary leader in the House of Representatives
- In office 16 April 1946 – 19 May 1946
- Preceded by: Laurent Deckers
- Succeeded by: Carl Romme
- Parliamentary group: Catholic People's Party

Member of the House of Representatives
- In office 17 September 1929 – 27 July 1948

Personal details
- Born: Franciscus Gerardus Cornelis Josephus Marie Teulings; 15 November 1891 's-Hertogenbosch, Netherlands
- Died: 23 June 1966 (aged 74) Vught, Netherlands
- Party: Catholic People's Party (from 1945)
- Other political affiliations: Roman Catholic State Party (1926–1945); General League (1918–1926)
- Spouses: Theresia van Son (m. 1923; died 1932) Catharina van Son (m. 1933; died 1964)
- Relations: Coen Teulings (grandson)
- Children: Anna-Maria Teulings (1927–2007); Christiaan Teulings (born 1930); 1 other daughter (first marriage)
- Education: University of Amsterdam (Bachelor of Laws, Master of Laws)
- Occupation: Politician · Civil servant · Jurist · Economist · Researcher · Financial analyst · Financial adviser · Corporate director · Nonprofit director · Media administrator · Education administrator

Franciscus Gerardus Cornelis Josephus Marie "Frans" Teulings (15 November 1891 – 23 June 1966) was a Dutch politician of the Roman Catholic State Party (RKSP) and later co-founder of the Catholic People's Party (KVP) and economist.

Teulings worked as student researcher at the University of Amsterdam June 1916 until July 1918. Teulings worked for the publishing company C.N. Teulings in 's-Hertogenbosch from August 1918 until September 1929 and as COO from November 1920 until September 1929. Teulings was elected as a Member of the House of Representatives after the election of 1929, taking office on 17 September 1929. In May 1937 Teulings was nominated as chairman of the supervisory board of the Catholic Radio Broadcasting serving from 10 May 1937 until 18 May 1940. On 10 May 1940 Nazi Germany invaded the Netherlands and the government fled to London to escape the German occupation. During World War II Teulings continued to serve in the House of Representatives but in reality the de facto political influence of the House of Representatives was marginalized. During the German occupation Teulings worked as an education administrator for the board of education of the Ons Middelbaar Onderwijs and as chairman from 11 July 1941 until 20 September 1949. Following the end of World War II Queen Wilhelmina ordered a Recall of Parliament and Teulings remained a Member of the House of Representatives, taking office on 20 November 1945.

On 22 December 1945 the Roman Catholic State Party was renamed as the Catholic People's Party, Teulings was one of the co-founders. Teulings was selected as parliamentary leader of the Catholic People's Party in the House of Representatives following the appointment of Laurent Deckers as a member of the Council of State, taking office on 16 April 1946. In the 1946 general election, Carl Romme was elected to the House of Representatives and took over as parliamentary leader on 20 May 1946. Teulings was elected to the Senate after the 1948 Senate election, he resigned from the House of Representatives the day he was installed in the Senate, taking office on 27 July 1948. Teulings was appointed as Minister of the Interior in the Drees–Van Schaik cabinet following the appointment of Johan van Maarseveen as Minister of Colonial Affairs, taking office on 20 September 1949. The cabinet fell on 24 January 1951 and continued to serve in a demissionary capacity until the cabinet formation of 1951 when it was replaced by Drees I cabinet with Teulings appointed as Deputy Prime Minister and Minister for Civil Defence, taking office on 15 March 1951. Teulings served again as acting Minister of the Interior from 18 November 1951 until 6 December 1951 following the death of Johan van Maarseveen. In June 1952 Teulings announced that he would not stand for the 1952 general election but wanted to return to the Senate. After the 1952 Senate election Teulings returned to the Senate, serving from 15 July 1952 until his resignation on 3 May 1957. Following the cabinet formation of 1952 Teulings per his own request asked not to be considered for a cabinet post in the new cabinet; the Drees I cabinet was replaced by the Drees II cabinet on 2 September 1952.

Teulings also became active in the private sector and worked as COO and vice chairman of the board of directors of investment firm CEBEMA in 's-Hertogenbosch from November 1952 until December 1961. Teulings was known for his abilities as a consensus builder and manager. Teulings continued to comment on political affairs until his death.

== Decorations ==
Honours
Ribbon bar	Honour	Country	Date	Comment
	Knight of the Order of the Netherlands Lion	Netherlands	31 August 1939	
	Knight of the Order of the Holy Sepulchre	Holy See	15 April 1950	
	Commander of the Order of Orange-Nassau	Netherlands	30 September 1952	

Party political offices
Preceded by Laurent Deckers	Parliamentary leader of the Catholic People's Party in the House of Representatives; 1946	Succeeded by Carl Romme
Political offices
Preceded by Josef van Schaik; Ad interim	Minister of the Interior; 1949–1951	Succeeded by Johan van Maarseveen
Preceded by Johan van Maarseveen	Minister of the Interior; 1951; Ad interim	Succeeded by Louis Beel
Preceded by Josef van Schaik	Deputy Prime Minister of the Netherlands; 1951–1952	Succeeded by Louis Beel
New office	Minister for Civil Defence; 1951–1952	Office discontinued
Non-profit organization positions
Unknown	Chairman of the Board of education of the Ons Middelbaar Onderwijs; 1941–1949	Unknown
Media offices
Unknown	Chairman of the Supervisory board of the Catholic Radio Broadcasting; 1937–1940	Unknown
