= Guus Albregts =

Dutch politician and economist

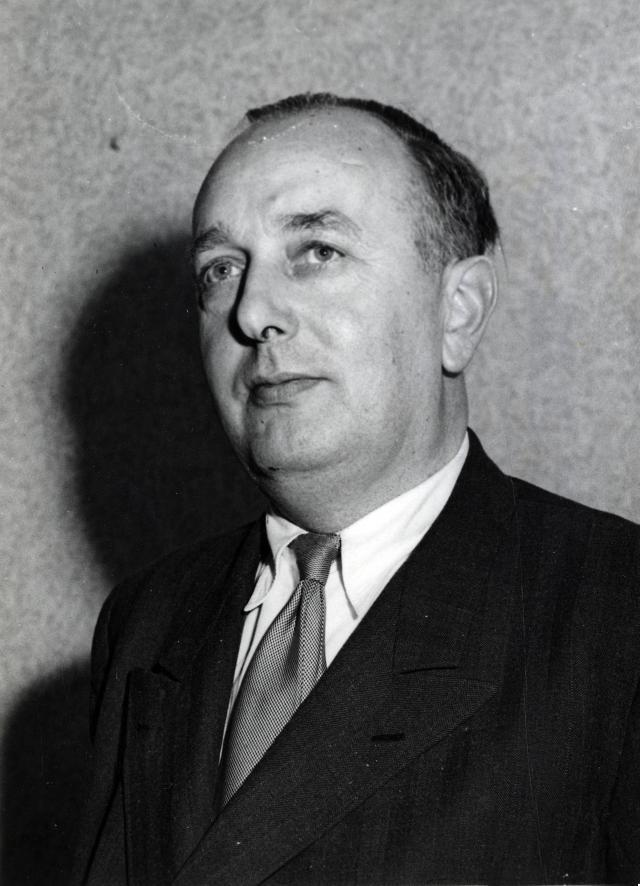
Guus Albregts

Augustinus Hendricus Martinus (Guus) Albregts (22 November 1900, in Vught – 8 June 1980, in 's-Hertogenbosch) was a Dutch economist and politician. As a member of the Catholic People's Party (KVP) he was a minister without portfolio, dealing with enhancing productivity in the first Drees cabinet from 1951 to 1952.

He studied and lectured economy at Tilburg University.

In 1952 he was awarded Knight of the Order of the Netherlands Lion.
