= Algemene Ouderdomswet =

Dutch state pension

The Algemene Ouderdomswet (General Old Age Pensions Act, abbreviated AOW) is a 1956 Dutch law that established a state pension for the elderly. It replaced a temporary measure introduced in 1947. Both were associated with Willem Drees, who proposed the 1947 scheme as minister of social affairs and was prime minister when the 1956 act was passed. The pension became closely identified with him, and the expression van Drees trekken ("drawing from Drees", after steuntrekken, to draw benefits) entered Dutch usage.

The act provides a flat-rate pension from the "AOW age", which rises with life expectancy. The AOW age was 65 until 2013 and reached 67 in 2024; it is set to rise to 67 years and 3 months in 2028. A full pension requires 50 years of residence in the Netherlands, whether or not the person worked, in the 50 years before reaching the AOW age. Those with fewer years of residence receive a proportionally reduced amount. A pensioner who shares a household with another person, whether through marriage, cohabitation or otherwise, receives a lower monthly amount than one who lives alone.
