= Willem Drees =

Prime Minister of the Netherlands from 1948 to 1958

His Excellency Willem Drees
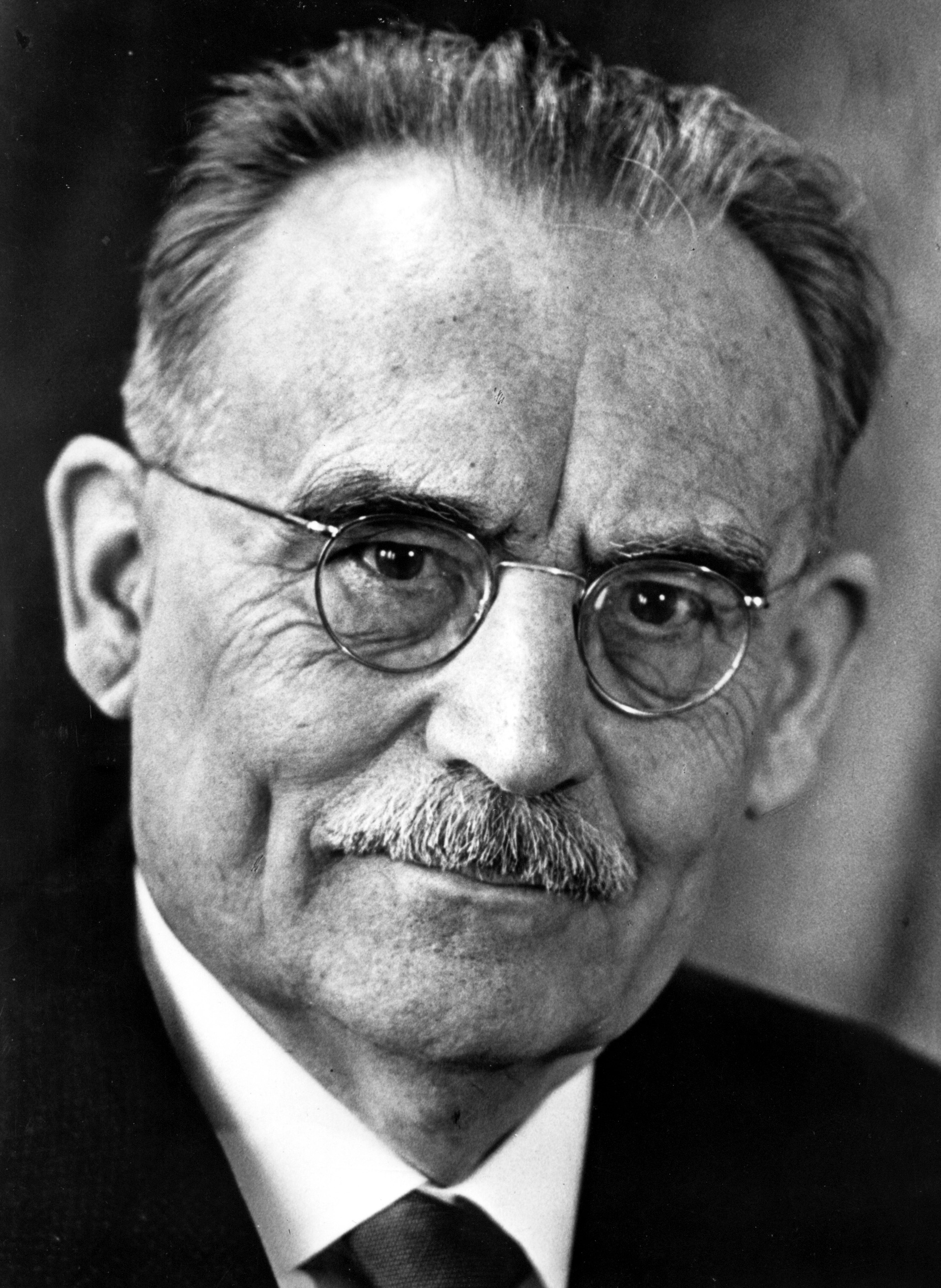
- Drees in 1958

Prime Minister of the Netherlands
- In office 7 August 1948 – 22 December 1958
- Monarchs: Wilhelmina; Juliana
- Deputy: See list: Josef van Schaik (1948–1951) Frans Teulings (1951–1952) Louis Beel (1952–1956) Teun Struycken (1956–1958)
- Preceded by: Louis Beel
- Succeeded by: Louis Beel

Minister of Finance
- Ad interim
- In office 1 July 1952 – 2 September 1952
- Prime Minister: Himself
- Preceded by: Piet Lieftinck
- Succeeded by: Jo van de Kieft

Minister of Colonial Affairs
- Ad interim
- In office 15 March 1951 – 30 March 1951
- Prime Minister: Himself
- Preceded by: Johan van Maarseveen
- Succeeded by: Leonard Peters

Leader of the Labour Party
- In office 9 February 1946 – 22 December 1958
- Preceded by: Office established
- Succeeded by: Jaap Burger

Deputy Prime Minister of the Netherlands
- In office 25 June 1945 – 7 August 1948
- Prime Minister: Willem Schermerhorn (1945–1946); Louis Beel (1948)
- Preceded by: Hendrik van Boeijen (1942)
- Succeeded by: Josef van Schaik

Minister of Social Affairs
- In office 25 June 1945 – 7 August 1948
- Prime Minister: Willem Schermerhorn (1945–1946); Louis Beel (1948)
- Preceded by: Dolf Joekes
- Succeeded by: Frans Wijffels

Leader of the Social Democratic Workers' Party
- In office 14 May 1940 – 9 February 1946
- Preceded by: Willem Albarda
- Succeeded by: Office discontinued
Additional positions
Member of the House of Representatives
In office 3 July 1956 – 3 October 1956
In office 15 July 1952 – 2 September 1952
In office 27 July 1948 – 10 August 1948
In office 4 June 1946 – 4 July 1946
In office 9 May 1933 – 25 June 1945
Parliamentary leader in the House of Representatives
In office 10 August 1939 – 25 September 1945
Preceded by	Willem Albarda
Succeeded by	Marinus van der Goes van Naters
Parliamentary group	Social Democratic Workers' Party

Personal details
- Born: 5 July 1886 Amsterdam, Netherlands
- Died: 14 May 1988 (aged 101) The Hague, Netherlands
- Party: Labour Party (1946–1971)
- Other political affiliations: Social Democratic Workers' Party (1904–1946)
- Relatives: Willem Drees Jr. (son); Willem B. Drees (grandson); Jacques Wallage (grandson-in-law)
- Education: Amsterdam Public Trade School (B.Acc)
- Occupation: Politician · civil servant · Accountant · Stenographer · Historian · Author
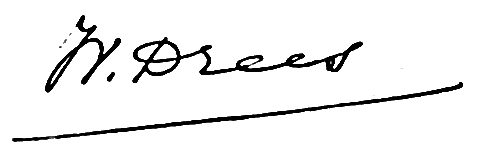
- Signature

Willem Drees Sr. (Dutch pronunciation; 5 July 1886 – 14 May 1988) was a Dutch politician of the Social Democratic Workers' Party (SDAP) and later co-founder of the Labour Party (PvdA) and historian who served as Prime Minister of the Netherlands from 7 August 1948 to 22 December 1958.

Drees was elected to the House of Representatives for the SDAP in the 1933 general election. He succeeded Willem Albarda as party leader in 1940 and, following the end of World War II, was appointed Deputy Prime Minister and Minister of Social Affairs in the national unity Schermerhorn–Drees cabinet. In February 1946, Drees was one of the co-founders of the Labour Party and became its first leader. After the 1948 general election, Drees became Prime Minister of the Drees–Van Schaik cabinet.

The Drees-Van Schaik cabinet fell on 24 January 1951 and after a short cabinet formation was replaced by the first Drees cabinet, with Drees continuing as Prime Minister. For the 1952 general election, Drees served again as lead candidate and following a successful cabinet formation formed the second Drees cabinet and continued as Prime Minister for a second term. For the 1956 general election Drees once again served as lead candidate and following another cabinet formation formed the third Drees cabinet and continued as Prime Minister for a third term. The third Drees cabinet fell on 11 December 1958 and shortly thereafter Drees announced his retirement and would step down as leader and would not serve another term as prime minister. Drees left office upon the installation of the caretaker second Beel cabinet on 22 December 1958.

Drees was known for his abilities as a skilful team leader and effective manager. From 1948 to 1958, his four cabinets were mostly praised and supported by the largest parties in the Netherlands. During his premiership, his cabinets were responsible for several major social reforms to social security, welfare, child benefits and education, overseeing the decolonization of the Dutch East Indies following the Indonesian National Revolution, the fallout of the annexation of former German territory and dealing with several major crises such as the North Sea flood of 1953 and Hofmans scandal.

Drees retired from active politics at 72 but continued to be active as a valued historian and prolific author and served on several state commissions and councils on behalf of the government. Drees was granted the honorary title of Minister of State on 22 December 1958 and continued to comment on political affairs as a statesman until his death in May 1988. He holds the record as the fourth longest-serving and longest-lived Prime Minister at 101 and his premiership is consistently regarded both by scholars and the public to have been one of the best in Dutch history.

== Early life and education ==
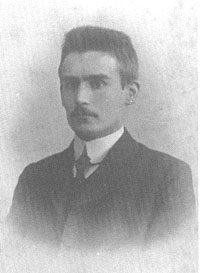
Drees in 1908

Willem Drees was born in Amsterdam on 5 July 1886 in an orthodox reformed middle-class family. His father Johannes Michiel Drees, a banker and supporter of Abraham Kuyper, died when Drees was five years old, which left his mother Anna Sophia van Dobbenburgh, his two siblings and himself in a precarious financial situation. Drees could continue studying thanks to the support of his uncle Frits. He attended the three-year Hogere Burgerschool (HBS), supplemented by the two final grades of the Amsterdam Public Trade School. Drees grew up attending Sunday school and catechism, but rejected the Christian creed at the age of eighteen.

He developed an interest in political and social affairs at this time, such as the Boer Wars and the Dreyfus affair. At the Trade School, he met the sons of diamond workers who were united in the General Diamond Workers' Union of the Netherlands, the most politically and socially developed social democratic labour union at the time. At the age of sixteen, Drees became a member of the Dutch Association for the Abolition of Alcoholic Beverages, and would remain a teetoler for the rest of his life. After attending a speech of Pieter Jelles Troelstra following his election victory in Amsterdam in December 1902, Drees became a democratic socialist. He joined the Social Democratic Workers' Party (SDAP) on his eighteenth birthday.

Near the conclusion of Drees' time at the Trade School, the school's principal offered Drees a position at a brewery, but he refused due to his opposition to alcoholic beverages. Instead, after obtaining his Bachelor of Accountancy degree in 1903, he started working as a bank teller for the Twentsche Bank in Amsterdam in July 1903. This work did not satisfy him, however, and he rejected an offer by his uncle Frits for a career in brokerage and insurance. In July 1906, Drees quit his job at the Twentsche Bank and pursued his passion, becoming a stenographer at the municipal council of Amsterdam, and then at the States General of the Netherlands in The Hague from January 1907 until August 1919.

== Political involvement ==
=== Local politics ===
Drees became a member of the executive committee of the SDAP's The Hague branch in 1910, and the following year, at the age of 25, he was elected as the branch's chairman, a position he would keep until 1931. He was first elected to the municipal council of The Hague in 1913, and would keep his seat until 1941. In 1919, Drees became the city's second social democratic alderman, alongside Willem Albarda. He was responsible for social affairs until 1931, and for finance and public works after that. In this period, Drees supported the broad coalition that governed the municipality, and was a proponent of a pragmatic, reformist course for the party; he had not supported Troelstra in his call for revolution in the Red Week in 1918. For 22 years, between 1919 and 1941, Drees also held a seat in the Provincial Council of South Holland.

Drees was asked to succeed Willem Vliegen as the SDAP's national chairman in 1926 and he reluctantly accepted, but after the party's secretary and several local branches protested his nomination at the party congress of that year due to Drees' limited national fame, he withdrew his nomination. The following year, however, he became a member of the national SDAP executive, where he would remain until the party's dissolution in 1946.

=== House of Representatives ===
Drees was elected to the House of Representatives in the 1933 general election, taking office on 9 May 1933 and simultaneously resigning as alderman of The Hague. He served as a frontbencher and spokesperson for social affairs. In the context of the Great Depression, he was a proponent of an active crisis policy of industrial planning and the execution of large-scale public works; he saw industrialisation as the structural solution to mass unemployment. Sooner than other prominent SDAP members, he advocated the devolution of the Dutch guilder. He also strongly opposed the activities of the National Socialist Movement in the Netherlands and other anti-democratic movements, stating in 1935 that fascists are not opponents but enemies. He likewise rejected cooperation with the Communist Party of the Netherlands. After the SDAP's parliamentary leader Willem Albarda was appointed Minister of Water Management in the second De Geer cabinet, Drees was selected to succeed him, becoming parliamentary leader on 10 August 1939.

=== World War II ===
Shortly after the German invasion of the Netherlands, Albarda announced he was stepping down as party leader, and Drees was unanimously selected as his successor on 14 May 1940. During the German occupation, Drees was taken hostage in Buchenwald concentration camp on 7 October 1940. On 7 October 1941, he was moved to Kamp Sint-Michielsgestel, but he was released on 11 May 1942 due to poor health. After his release, Drees played a prominent role as vice chairman and acting chairman of the illegal Executive Committee of the SDAP, and as a prominent participant in secret interparty consultations. In 1944, he became chairman of the Contact Commissie van de Illegaliteit and a member of the College van Vertrouwensmannen, which the government-in-exile charged with the preparation of steps to be taken at the time of liberation.

=== Deputy Prime Minister ===
Following the end of World War II, Drees was appointed as Minister of Social Affairs and Deputy Prime Minister in the national unity Schermerhorn–Drees cabinet, taking office on 25 June 1945. In February 1946, he was one of the co-founders of the Labour Party (PvdA) and became its first Leader. For the 1946 general election, Drees served as one of the lead candidates, and following the 1946 cabinet formation continued his offices in the first Beel cabinet. For the 1948 general election, Drees again served as one of the PvdA's lead candidates, and following a successful cabinet formation with the Catholic People's Party, he formed the Drees–Van Schaik cabinet, with Drees becoming Prime Minister of the Netherlands, taking office on 7 August 1948.

=== Prime Minister ===
From 7 August 1948 to 22 December 1958, Drees was Prime Minister of the Netherlands in four successive cabinets: the Drees–Van Schaik cabinet, the first Drees cabinet, the second Drees cabinet and the third Drees cabinet. From 1948 to 1958, his four cabinets were mostly praised and supported by the largest parties in the Netherlands. As Roman/Red coalitions, they were formed by the Catholic People's Party, the Labour Party and the Christian Historical Union (CHU), supplemented by the People's Party for Freedom and Democracy (VVD) until 1952, and the Anti-Revolutionary Party (ARP) from 1952 on.

His period in office saw at least four major political developments: the traumas of decolonisation, economic reconstruction, the establishment of the Dutch welfare state, and international integration and co-operation, including the formation of Benelux, the OEEC, NATO, the European Coal and Steel Community, and the European Economic Community.

In his approach to economics, Drees as prime minister (as noted by one observer) “advocated austerity as the best political recipe for progress;” a policy he pursued. This not only earned him respect from many people, but also helped the Netherlands to recover from the impact of the Second World War.

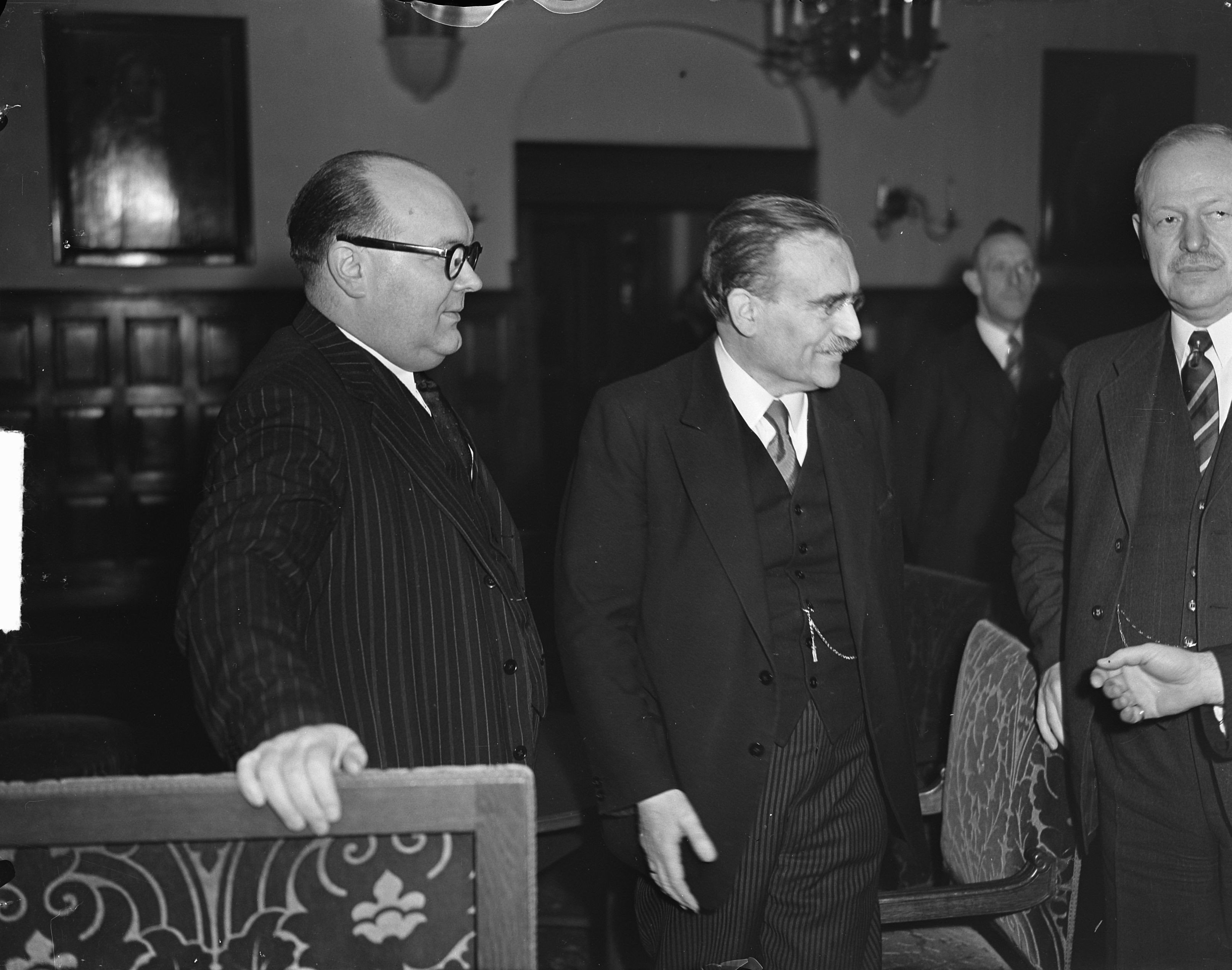
Belgian Prime Minister Paul-Henri Spaak, Luxembourgish Prime Minister Pierre Dupong and Drees at a Benelux conference, 10 March 1949

A wide range of social reforms were carried out during Drees's tenure as prime minister. In social security, the Occupational Pensions Funds Act of March 1949 made membership of industry-wide pension funds compulsory, while the General Old Age Pensions Act of May 1956 introduced universal flat-rate old age pensions for all residents as a right and with no retirement condition at the age of 65. The Retired Persons' Family Allowances Act of November 1950 established a special allowance for pensioned public servants with children (abolished in 1963), a law of November 1950 extended compulsory health insurance to cover other groups such as old-age and invalidity pensioners, and a law of December 1956 introduced health insurance with special low contributions for old-aged pensioners below a certain income ceiling. A law of August 1950 established equal rights for illegitimate children, and introduced an allowance for disabled children between the ages of 16 and 20. This law also introduced monthly (previously annual) fixing of the number of children for whom allowances are claimable. The Temporary Family Allowances Act for the Self-employed of June 1951 entitled self-employed persons with low incomes to family allowance for the first and second child (abolished in 1963), and a law of February 1952 introduced an allowance for studying and for disabled children until the age of 27. In 1949, an unemployment insurance act was passed that came into effect in 1952. This contained redundancy pay insurance "for an initial short period of unemployment and the actual unemployment insurance for the period thereafter."

In 1949, an Artist Subsidy Scheme was introduced, under which artists "lacking sufficient income from their profession received a financial provision for a certain time allowing them to continue working." A Law of 22 June 1950 established the Praeventiefonds with the task of making funds available "to take measures aimed at preventing disease or promoting health." From 1950 to 1957, the Praeventiefonds received a separate budget "from the Equalization Fund for supplementary nutrition for TB patients curing at home." Under the Accident Pension Supplement Act of 26 May 1950, as noted by one study, "in certain cases persons who received an annuity or benefit under one of the Accident Acts were granted a supplement to their annuity or benefit."

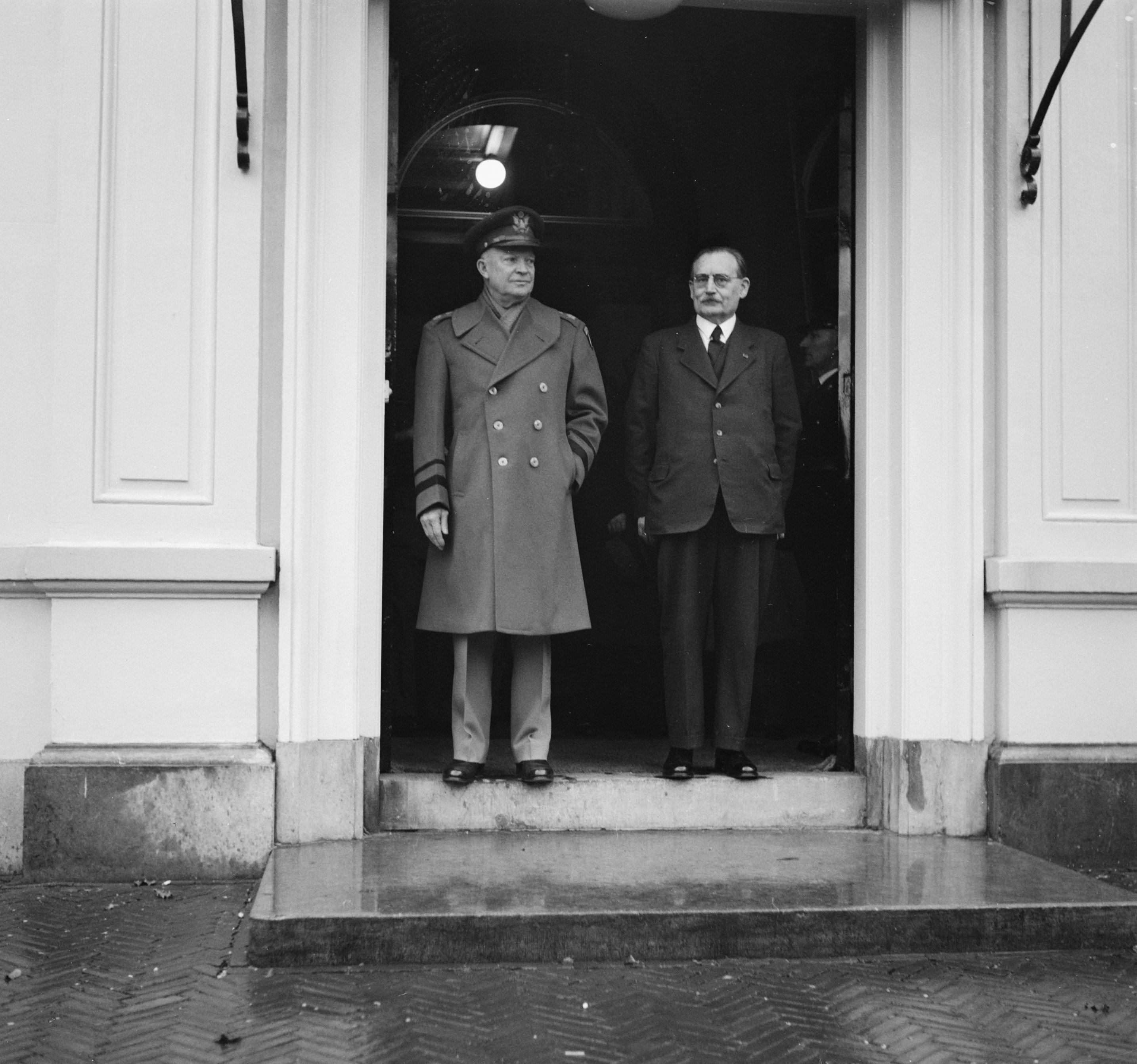
Newly appointed Supreme Allied Commander Europe, General Dwight D. Eisenhower, and Drees at the Ministry of Defence, 11 January 1951

The Pension and Savings Funds Act (PSW) of 1952 improved the vulnerable position of employees in private companies by (as noted by oen study) "obliging the employer who had promised a pension to his employee to cover the pension risk he assumed, either with a pension fund or with an insurance company" although the Act did not oblige employers to promise a pension. This was in contrast to salaries, which in all cases employees were entitled to. In the case of pensions, employees were only entitled to these if these had been promised to them. An Act of 29 September 1955, amending the Poor Law, introduced an amended regulation regarding the domicile of social assistance, or for the payment of the costs of nursing or care of the sick, disabled and elderly in the appropriate institutions. The aim of the amendment was to provide a more satisfactory arrangement for liability for costs. In 1956, a Hungarian Refugee Assistance Scheme was introduced, along with Provision for the Blind (Voorziening voor Blinden). This provision recognized the blind as one of the groups in society entitled to a special benefit. In addition to the standard allowances for maintenance, which could be increased by a children's allowance, benefits tailored to the individual case could also be awarded, such as (as noted by one study) "expenses for the mental and cultural development of the blind person, costs of education or training and medical treatment or nursing of the blind person in his family." In 1957, a new social health insurance scheme for indigent pensioners was set up. In January 1958, legal aid was introduced. The General Widows and Pensions Act was also drafted, which was passed under the second Beel cabinet.

In terms of working conditions, safety Regulations for Electric Passenger and Goods Lifts with a Cage that can be entered were introduced on 15 June 1949. A Decree further amending the Safety Decree for Factories and Workplaces, 1938 dated January 1950 added a number of new sections to a previous Safety Decree issued in 1938, which dealt with such matters as general safety provisions and the construction and use of scaffolds. Other decrees were issued concerning working hours for various groups. The Silicosis Act of 1951 sought to combat and prevent dust lung diseases, while the Law on dangerous tools of 5 March 1952 contained safety regulations with regard to dangerous tools and protection equipment. In the legislative amendment of 19 January 1955, after a number of failed attempts, the regulation of working and rest times in agriculture was realized in the Labor Act 1919. An Act of 18 June 1953 amended the provisions of the Labor Act 1919 on the night work of women and young persons. For instance, the time of commencement of the daily working hours for blue-collar workers under the age of 16 was raised from 5 to 6 hours, and the minimum night's rest for young people from 11 to 12 hours. A law of 6 August 1954 established a legal ban on industrial work for 14-year-old girls. In 1950, works councils were established, requiring all enterprises with more than 25 employees to allow their employees to elect representatives. The Industrial Reorganization Act of 1950 made it mandatory for workers to belong to industrial organizations; bipartite associations that represented labor and management interests. These were primarily responsible for administering occupational security programs like disability and pensions. According to one study, "by making participation in the associations mandatory, Drees was able to vastly expand the scope of the workforce covered by social security programs, guaranteeing a greater degree of uniformity in the benefits workers received."

Dismissal law was reformed in 1953, with a scheme introduced that (as one study has noted) "not only created the possibility of claiming compensation after a manifestly unreasonable dismissal, but also the so-called 'restoration of employment'." A Royal Decree of the 1st of August 1953 introduced a 48-hour week for nursing personnel. A royal decree of the 11th of August 1954 completed (as noted by one study) “the statutory regulation of working hours and periods of rest for the staff of warehouses, which up to 11 August 1954 applied only to warehouses annexed to factories or docks.” An Act of the 19th of January 1955 authorized the Crown to make regulations regarding hours of work and of rest. A royal decree of the 21st of March 1956 introduced new safety regulations for threshing machines, straw balers and straw-binding machines, while a royal decree of the 23rd of March 1956 laid down (as noted by one study) “that lifts generally need to be provided with a certificate of approval. This certificate is issued only if certain conditions with regard to manufacture and safety protection have been complied with.” In addition, a royal decree of the 20th of July 1956 prohibited sandblasting. A royal decree of the 20th of March 1957 contained measures aimed at safeguarding workers against ionizing radiations, while a royal decree of the 21st of June 1957 prohibited (from the 1st of October that year onwards) all work by young persons outside of normal working hours. A royal decree of the 30th of August 1957 prohibited certain categories of agricultural work for women and young persons. Also in 1957, the dismissal of female civil servants upon marriage was abolished.

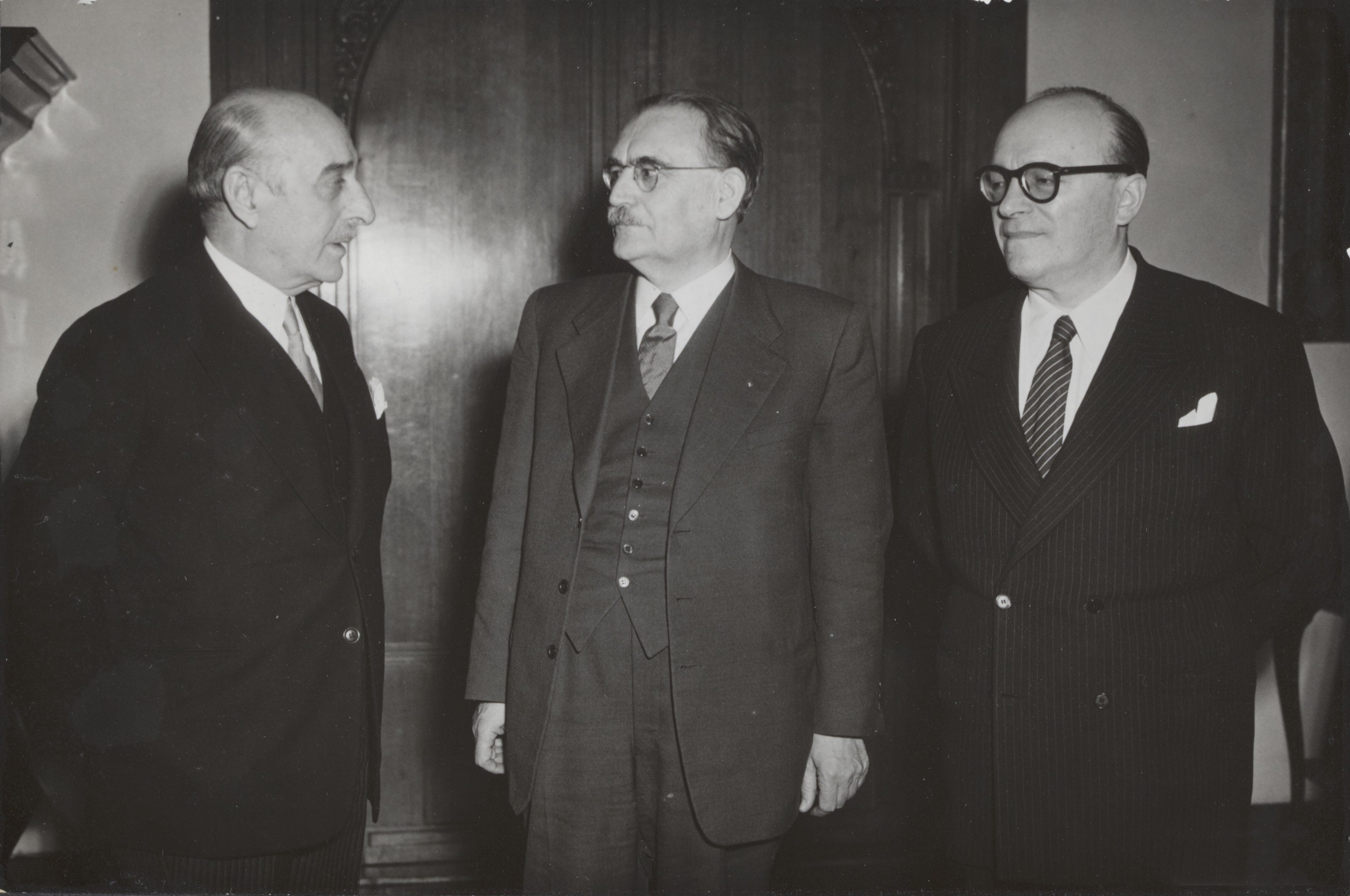
Greek Prime Minister Alexandros Papagos, Drees and Greek Foreign Minister Stefanos Stefanopoulos, 2 February 1954

In the field of housing, the Implementation for Rent Act (1950) fixed rents and rent increases, while the Regional and Town Planning Act (1950) regulated the planning of house building. In addition, the Reconstruction Act of 1950 established housebuilding programmes, and legislation was passed on house building standards (1951), the uniformity of buildings (1954), and uniform building standards (1956). In 1953, a premium scheme for home improvement was set up by the government. From 1956 it was possible for low-income groups to obtain a mortgage guarantee. A decree of the 5th of June 1954 modified a building premium and subsidy decree for housing to the effect (as noted by one study) “that under certain conditions the State may grant subsidies to private corporations for the building of houses and homes for the aged.” It was also made possible for the State (as noted by one study) “to grant financial aid to building associations or municipalities for the building of houses and homes for the aged.” A decree was also introduced on the 19th November 1957 aimed at promoting living space. It provided for compensation for costs incurred by municipalities in making payments to those making alterations to property “with the intention of providing or continuing to provide more families with housing accommodation” as noted by one study, and those who, as noted by one study, “with the intention of making available more living space, free living space being used by them and thus incur costs for removal, refurnishing or storage.”

In education, measures were carried out such as increased expenditure on the system, a reduction in registration fees at state universities and at the institute of technology, and the granting (in January 1956) of a special benefit to primary school teachers and to certain categories of vocational teachers, "particularly those who risk being unemployed and who cannot lay claim to a retaining fee." From 1951 onwards government grants were provided to 'impoverished young people from very good study aptitude that met reasonable requirements of general development and civilization' (De Looper, 1997). An Act was introduced on the 9th of July 1953 which was designed (as noted by one study) “to protect pupils against the consequences of contagious diseases of the staff of all educational institutions,” with staff of educational institutions required to prove that they didn’t suffer from tuberculosis of the respiratory organs by possessing valid certificates to show this. In 1954, the maximum amount of scholarships to be granted by the State was increased.

In 1954, in regards to university education, the amount made available in the national budget for the granting of scholarships and interest-free loans was quadrupled. A royal decree of the 30th of December 1955, aimed at staff teaching in primary schools, provided for (as noted by one study) “a claim to an indemnity for dismissal (in the event of reduction of staff), in so far as salary is not in any case payable pending re-employment.” An Act of the 24th of May 1956, together with a royal decree of the 18th of June 1956, provided for higher education tuition fees to be reduced in certain situations. A decree of the 8th of October 1956 provided rules that concerned the legal status of female teachers at nursery schools. Amongst other provisions, it provided for the payment of holiday allowances, entitlements during holidays, and sickness and survivors’ benefits. A doubling of the deduction of costs for learning and studying children aged 16 to 27 from income and wealth tax was carried out, followed by a triple deduction for income, wage and wealth taxes for parents with studying children aged 16 to 27 who lived away from home and who were largely supported by their parents. Courses were also instituted for girls in employment, one of the objects being (as noted by one study) “to prepare girls aged 16 and over who work in industry for the tasks which they will later have to perform as women in the community.” A royal decree of the 15th of July 1957 increased salary standards for personnel in primary education and primary agricultural and horticultural education. A decree of the 5th of August 1957, as noted by one study, “created the possibility of subsidizing the education of children who are in sanatoria suffering or recovering from prolonged sickness.” The Building (Pre-elementary Education) Decree of the 6th of September 1957, as noted by one study, “contained minimum standards regarding construction and furnishing of the school buildings, as well as regarding the foundation and the number of pupils per room.”

Other educational initiatives included secondary schools for girls and special primary education in 1949, teacher training colleges in 1952, the extension of compulsory education to eight years in 1950, the Nursery Education Act of 1955, which introduced the option of kindergarten for children from the age of four upwards, while also establishing regulations for nursery-school teachers, an extension of technical education and the apprenticeship system, and the Schoolfees Act of 1955, which abolished all fees up to the school-leaving age.

A department of social welfare was also established (1952), employment facilities for the disabled were expanded and care for the blind received money. In 1952, a policy framework was set up for dealing with "problem families," such as subsidies for pillarized family care and social development work in the cities. That same year, the Ministry of Social Affairs began granting subsidies "to promote the employment of the blind, on the one hand through contributions for individual cases (purchase or conversion of equipment, transport, etc.), on the other hand through subsidizing the work facilities of the blind." Following on from schemes for the blind, equal provisions for other handicapped persons were established in 1955 and 1958. From 1953, subsidies to voluntary agencies serving the physically and the mentally handicapped were included in the budget of the Ministry of Culture, Recreation, and Social Welfare, when they were introduced as an experiment that year. In addition, "Government care for passengers on inland vessels started with the establishment of the Social Commission for Boatmen in 1956." The Water Supply Act of 1957 sought to achieve sanitation in terms of drinking water quality. In 1957, "the task of the Central Commission for Cultural Work in Labor Camps (CCCA) was modified and expanded and at the same time the Provincial and Local Committees were abolished. The task of the CCCA was formulated as the promotion of the cultural interests of workers, group-housed in housing estates whose operation and/or management falls under the care of the minister and, if necessary, other groups of workers, group-housed outside their places of residence." The Health Act of 1956 contained new legal regulations concerning regarding the organization of public health care, while the Medicines Supply Act of 28 July 1958, contained new regulations "regarding the supply of medicines and the practice of medical preparation."

In 1950, a Social Economic Council was set up that included union and employer representatives along with independent experts. With 45 members, it became the government’s official advisory board on social and economic issues. In addition, a law on economic competition was introduced together with full legal capacity for married women, and a number of 'regulation laws' were passed through parliament including the Insurance Brokerage Act, the Shop Closing Act (including some twenty amendments), development plans for disadvantaged areas and the Credit System Supervision Act.

Although a socialist, Drees was not supportive of socialization, as one observer has noted:

The prime minister, never a friend of large-scale theoretical projects, advanced a number of pragmatic arguments against the Dutch version of economic democracy. He pointed out that, in view of the destitute state of the Dutch economy, socialization essentially meant taking over the bankrupt sectors of the economy and saddling the taxpayers with paying for both the restructuring and a new set of bureaucrats. There were political considerations as well. Drees, like the German reformers, pointed out that neither the Dutch voters, nor even the members of the PvdA, were particularly interested in economic Socialism.

The third Drees cabinet fell on 11 December 1958 and shortly thereafter Drees announced his retirement from politics. Drees left office upon the installation of the caretaker second Beel cabinet on 22 December 1958.

=== Post premiership ===
He was granted the honorary title of Minister of State on 22 December 1958 and continued to comment on political affairs as a statesman until his death in May 1988 at the age of 101. He continued to be active as a valued historian and prolific author and served on several state commissions and councils on behalf of the government. The Labour Party appointed him a member of its Executive Council for life in 1959. Due to impaired hearing he stopped attending its meetings in 1966. He strongly disagreed with New Left tendencies in the membership and strategies of the Labour Party, and eventually gave up membership of a party he had served for close to 67 years. As one authority has noted, “Drees could not appreciate the shift to the left that "his" Labour Party made in the late 1960s and early 1970s.”

Drees believed, as noted by one journal, that Labour's left wing "had betrayed the party's social democratic foundations." In earlier years, Drees had been critical of overtures Joop den Uyl made to the New Left by agreeing with several of their policies, which Drees felt had put off middle-class voters and contributed to Labour’s defeat in elections held in 1963. Drees also clashed publicly with his Labour successors, with one journal noting how he sharply criticized "the Labor leadership of the day for its unconditional opposition to deployment."

Reflecting on his grandfather’s decision to leave the Labour Party, Drees' grandson Willem B. Drees argued that

For him, socialism revolved around the classic themes of the movement from the nineteenth century onward: the fight against gross inequality in income and wealth, and therefore the socialization of the means of production and strong governance in the interests of the socially disadvantaged. He remained radical in his ambitions, even though little could be achieved within coalitions and because he had to make many concessions to coalition partners. For him, the break with the Labour Party (PvdA) was not a turn to the right; it was a rejection of the redefinition of "left" in these "sixties" as culturally progressive rather than socialist.

== Views on European policy decisions ==
During his political career, Drees was critical of various European policies. For instance, Drees and a number of Labour figures were concerned that European integration could have a negative impact on both national interests and Dutch social-democratic policy, fearing that (as noted by one study) "in a European framework social democrats were forced to make too many concessions to liberals and catholics to allow for a social democratic economic policy." Drees was also opposed to Dutch involvement in the Pleven Plan, which called for the formation of a European army.

Drees was also concerned that the European Coal and Steel Community would harm the Dutch strategy of economic reconstruction, based on low wages and prices. In later years, the PVV MP Martin Bosma argued that Drees (as noted by one study) "was not only a forerunner of the PVV's position on European integration, but also on labour migration, both from inside and outside Europe;" sparking a rebuke from a grandchild of Drees'. Also, while critical of certain European policies, Drees nevertheless refuted in his memoirs an accusation that he was unenthusiastic about European integration.

== Reputation ==
During his time as prime minister, Drees had a reputation for thriftiness and simplicity, as noted by one study:

Stories about Willem Drees always mention his thriftiness and simplicity. The most important politician in the Netherlands went to work every morning either on foot or by bicycle – he did not need a chauffeur-driven car. At the time, most politicians enjoyed cigars and drinking, but Drees refrained. And when an American diplomat visited Drees at home to discuss American financial support for the Dutch economy, Mrs Drees apparently served him a cup of tea and a biscuit. The American supposedly said that a country with such a thrifty Prime Minister was undoubtedly greatly in need of assistance through the Marshall Plan.

As another observer has noted about Drees:

He lived in an ordinary rental house on Beeklaan in The Hague, neither particularly small nor particularly large, accessible by first opening a loudly creaking garden gate. He didn't keep any mistresses, not even secretly. He enjoyed going to the cinema with his wife, but preferred to queue for the ticket. If necessary, he used the company car, but he considered the tram just as suitable. He was aware of his own image of "ordinariness" and cultivated it, but it didn't cost him any effort.

== Personal life ==
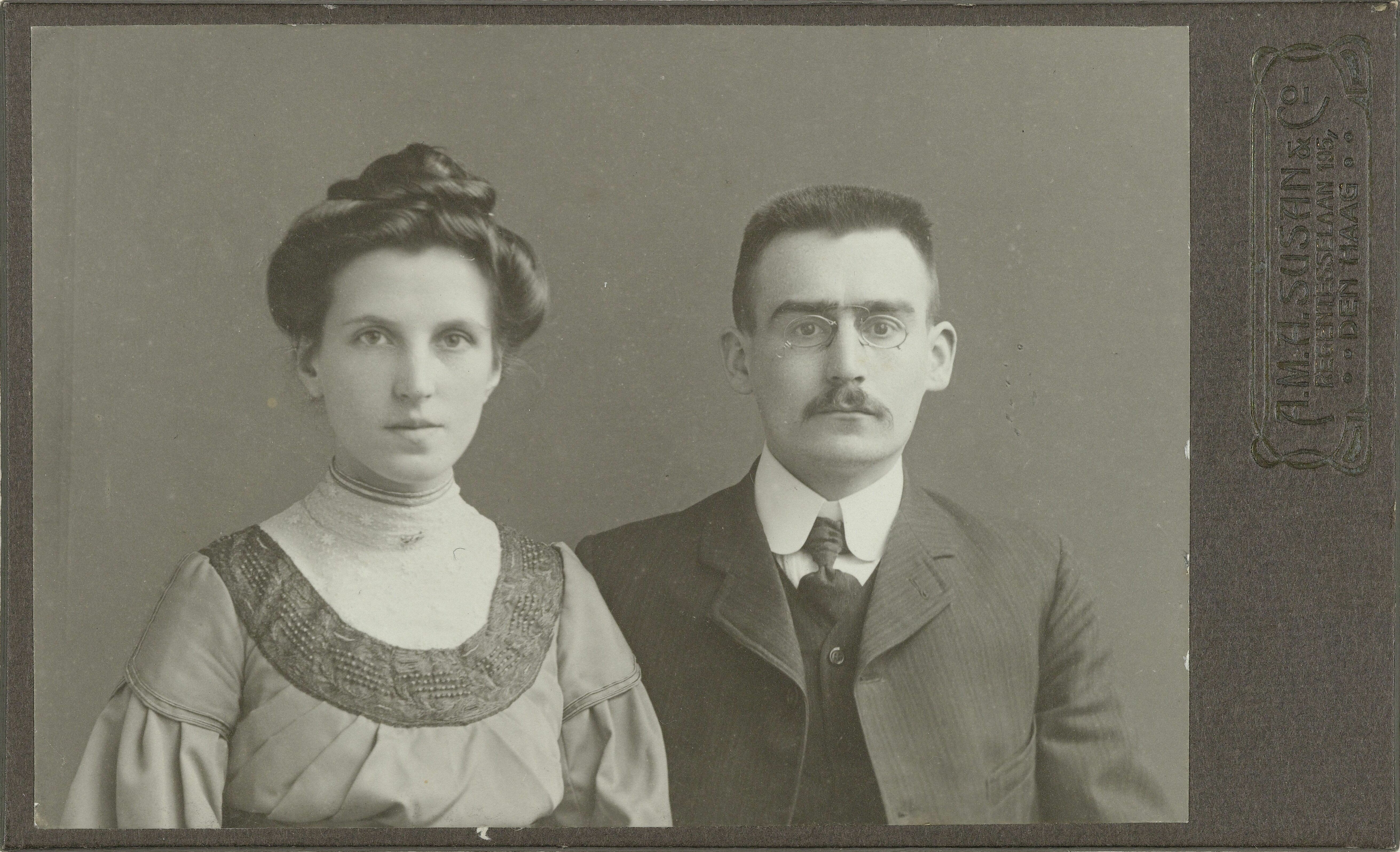
Catharina Hent and Willem Drees in 1911

On 28 July 1910, Drees married Catharina Hent (6 May 1888 – 30 January 1974) and had two sons and two daughters. Both his sons Jan Drees and Willem Drees Jr. were active members of the Labour Party, but just like Drees left the party around 1970. They joined Democratic Socialists '70 (DS'70), which Drees never did.

Drees was a life-long teetotaler. He was also an Esperantist and addressed the 1954 World Esperanto Congress, which was held in Haarlem.

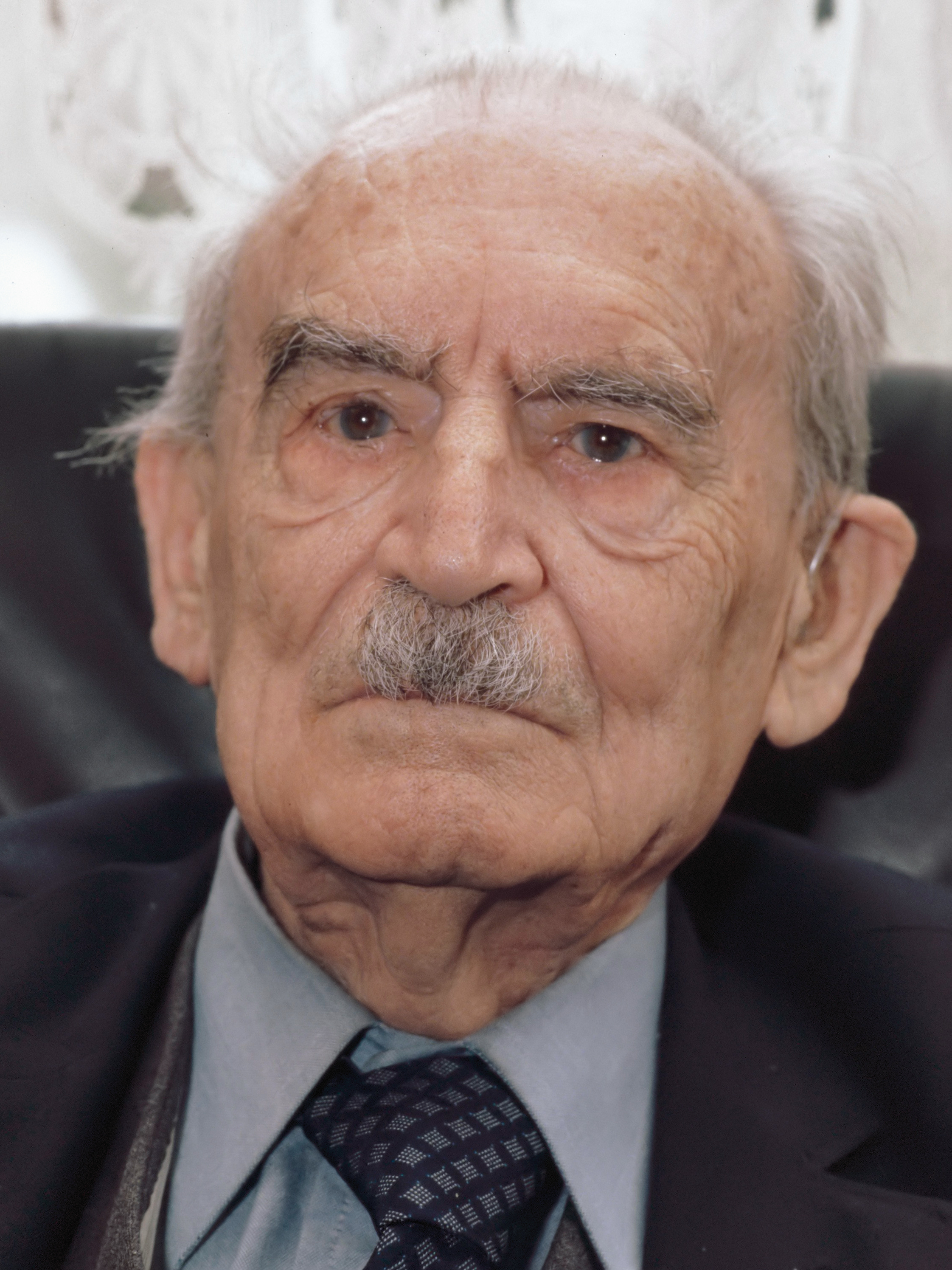
Drees in his house in The Hague, 2 July 1981

Drees died on 14 May 1988 in The Hague, at age 101. From 22 August 1986, when former Turkish President Celâl Bayar died, until his own death, Drees was the world's oldest living former head of government.

== Legacy ==
In 2004 he ended in third place in the election of The Greatest Dutchman.

== Decorations ==
Honours
Ribbon bar	Honour	Country	Date	Comment
	Knight Grand Cross of the Order of the Netherlands Lion	Netherlands	22 December 1958	
	Grand Cross of the Order of Leopold	Belgium	10 March 1949	
	Grand Cross of the Order of the Dannebrog	Denmark		
	Knight Grand Cross of the Order of the Holy Trinity	Ethiopia	3 November 1954	
	Grand Cross of the Order of the Legion of Honour	France	10 July 1954	
	Grand Cross of the Royal Order of George I	Greece	2 February 1954	
	Grand Cross of the Order of the Star of Africa	Liberia	10 December 1956	
	Grand Cross of the Order of Adolphe of Nassau	Luxembourg		
	Grand Cross of the Order of the Oak Crown	Luxembourg	12 July 1951	
	Knight Grand Cross of the Royal Norwegian Order of St. Olav	Norway		
	Grand Cross of the Order of Vasa	Sweden		
	Knight Grand Cross (First Class) of the Order of the White Elephant	Thailand	26 September 1955	
	Knight Grand Cross of the Order of St Michael and St George	United Kingdom	24 July 1958	
	Medal of Freedom with Gold Palm	United States	7 April 1953	

Honorific titles
Ribbon bar	Honour	Country	Date	Comment
	Minister of State	Netherlands	22 December 1958	Style of Excellency

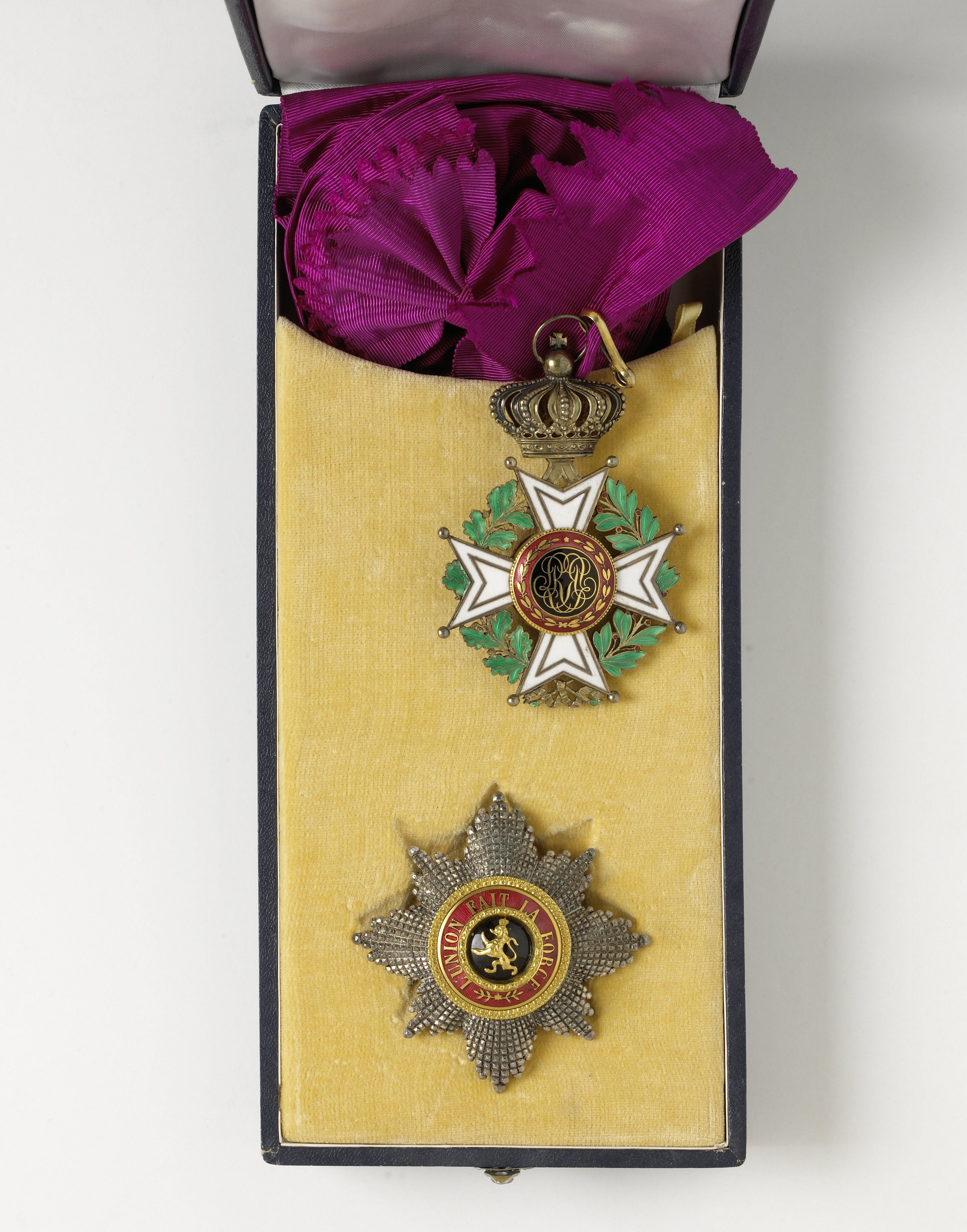
The Grand Cross of the Belgian Order of Leopold awarded to Drees on during his visit to Brussels, on 10 March 1949 by Belgian Regent; Prince Charles, Count of Flanders

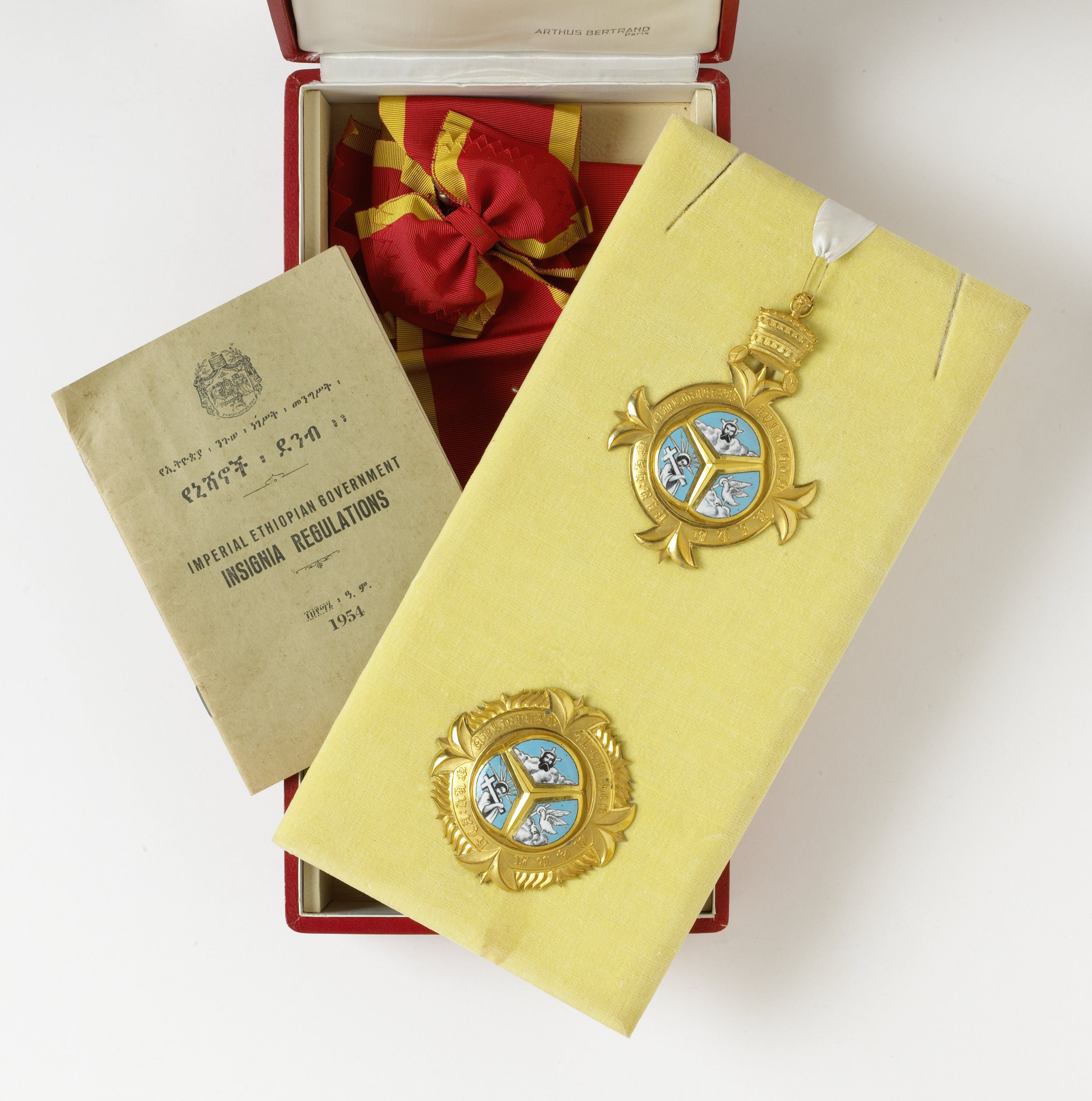
The Imperial Ethiopian Order of the Holy Trinity, awarded to Drees by Emperor Haile Selassie during his state visit to the Netherlands on 3 November 1954

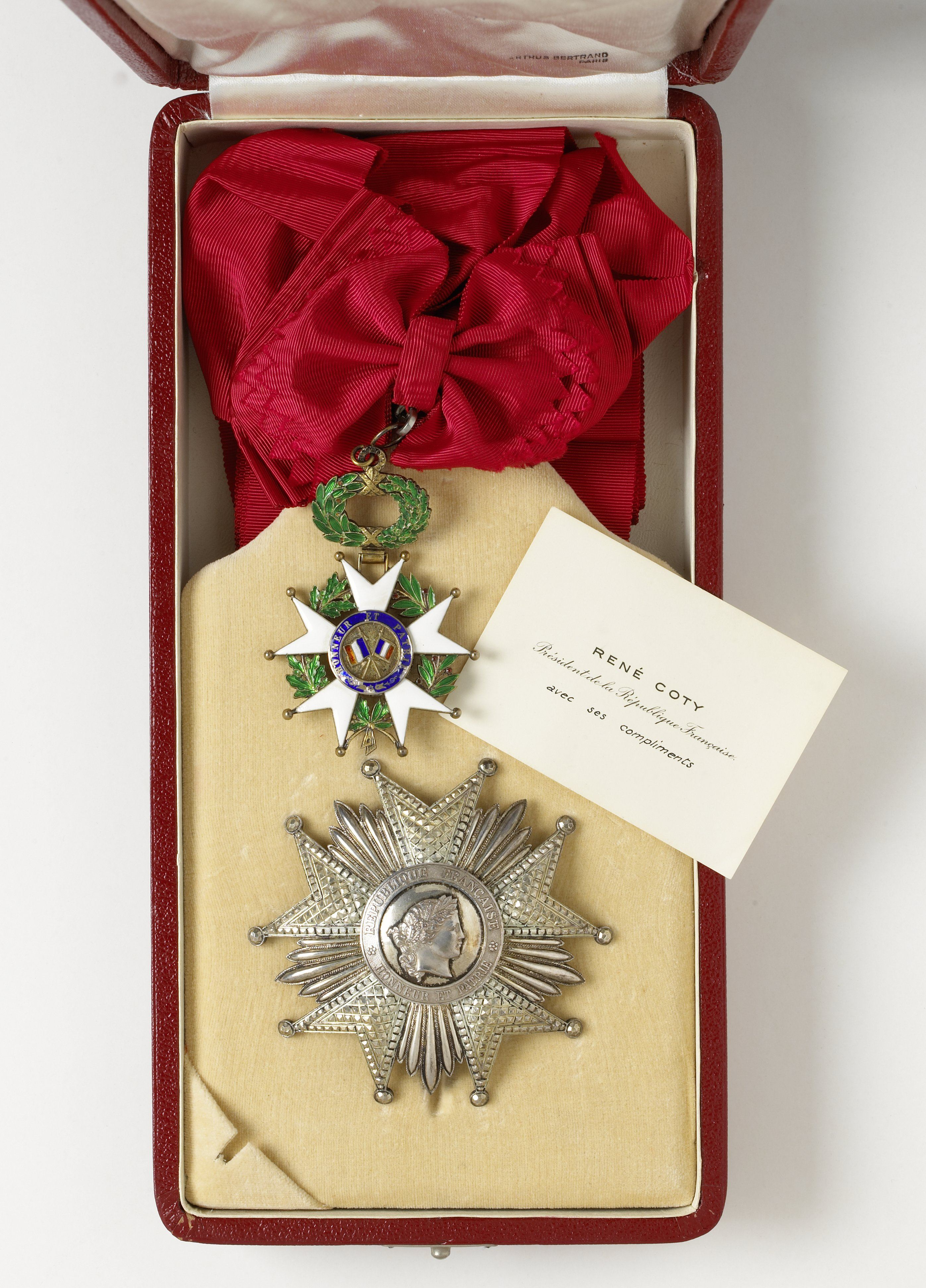
Drees' insignia of the Grand Cross of the Legion of Honour given to him by President René Coty on 10 July 1954

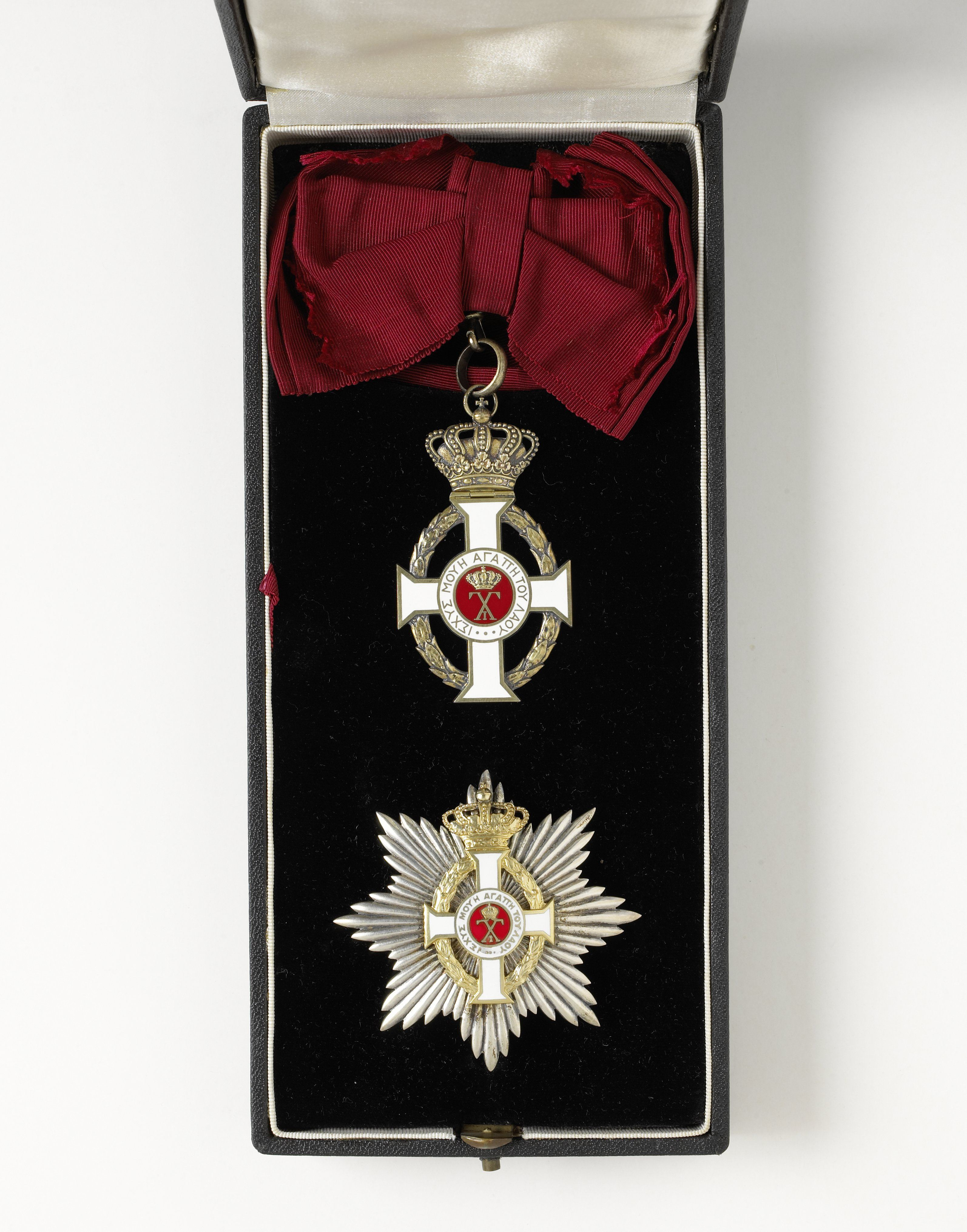
The Grand Cross of the Order of George I, awarded to Drees by Paul, King of the Greeks, in June 1954 on the occasion of the visit of the Prime Minister of Greece, Field Marshal Alexander Papagos, to the Netherlands on 2 February 1954

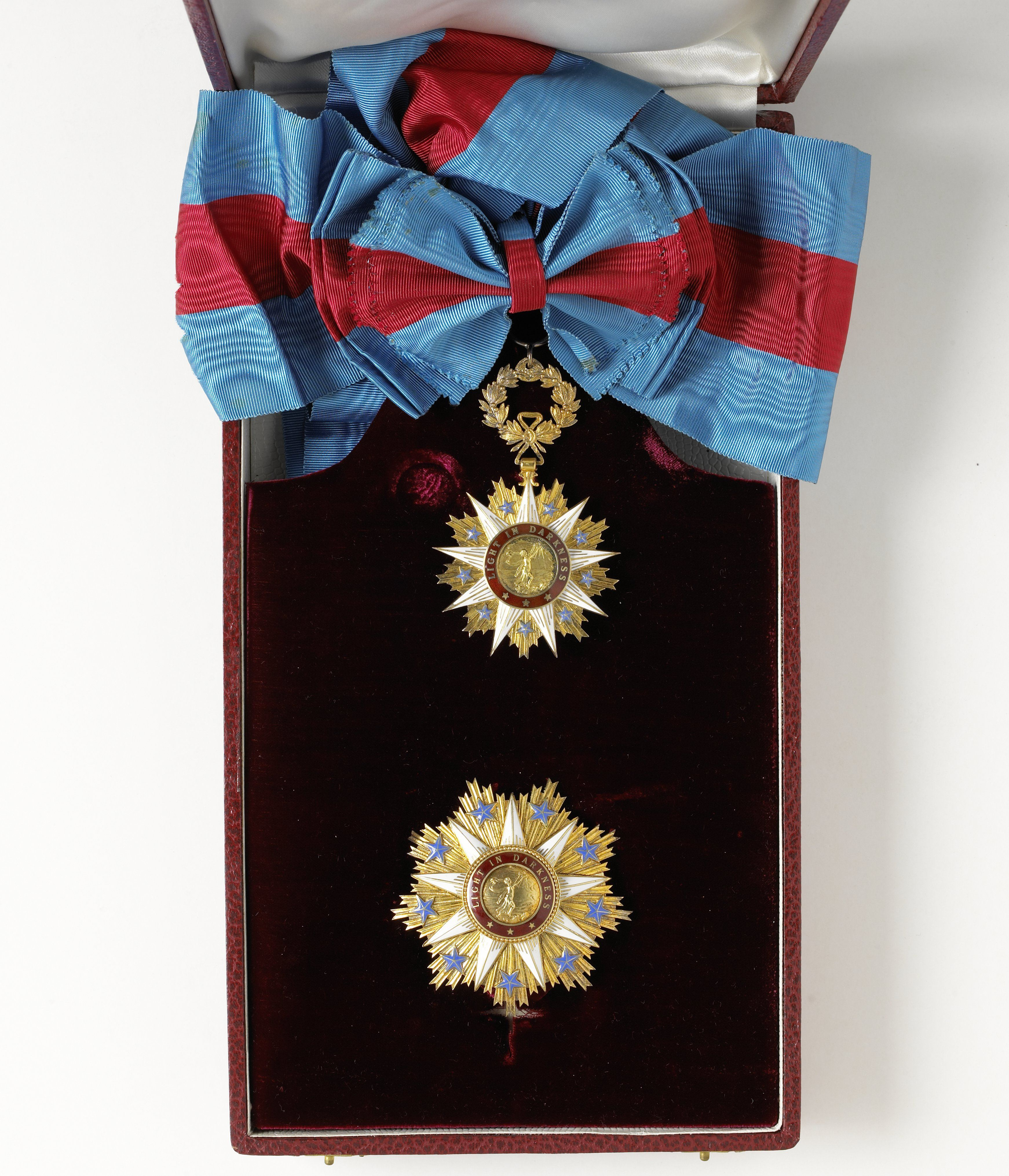
The Grand Cross of the Order of the Star of Africa, awarded to Drees by William V.S. Tubman, President of Liberia, on 10 December 1956 on the occasion of his state visit to the Netherlands on 15 October 1956

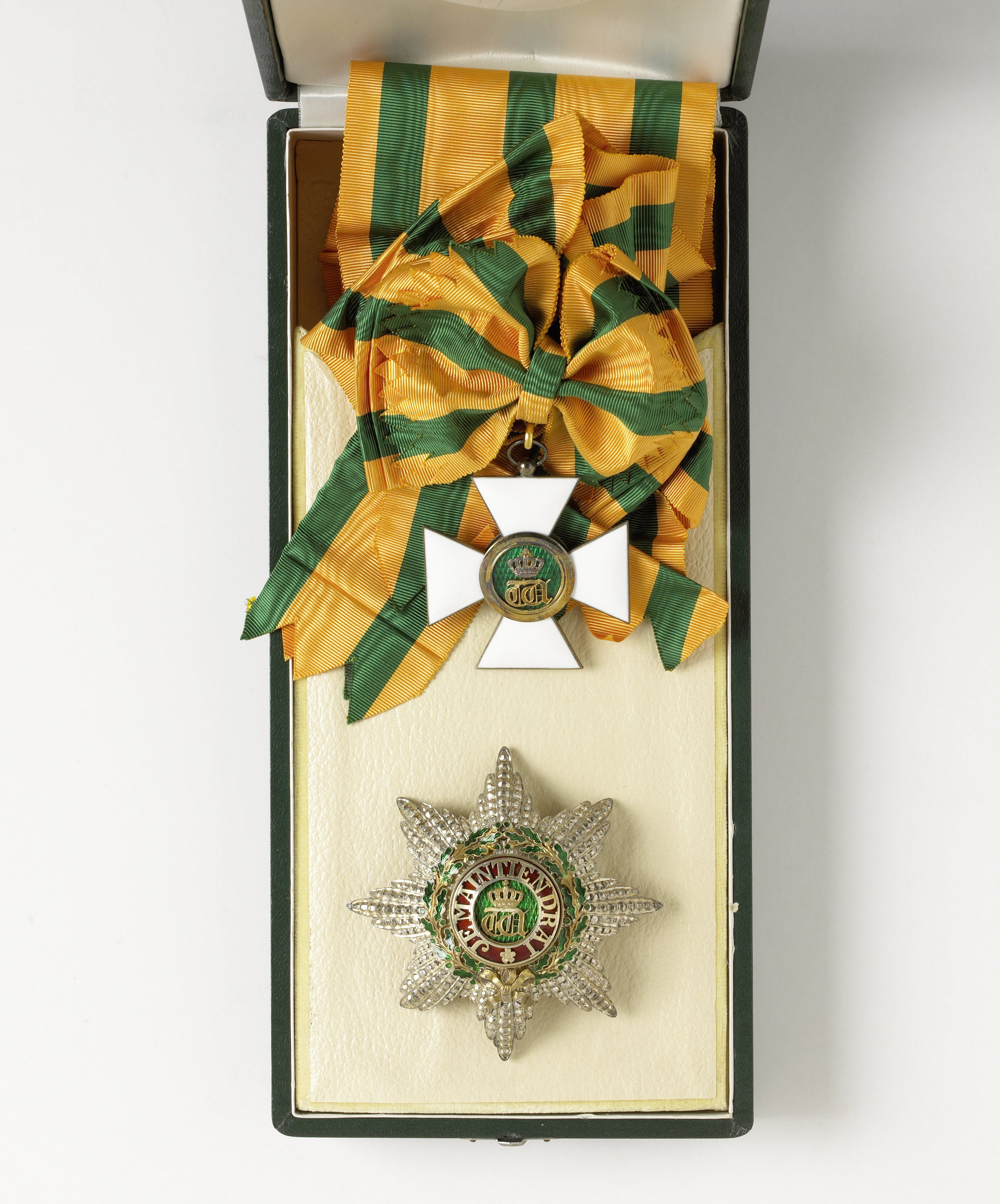
The Grand Cross of the Order of the Oak Crown, awarded to Drees by Charlotte, Grand Duchess of Luxembourg on 12 July 1951 on the occasion of the state visit of Queen Juliana and Prince Bernhard to Luxembourg from 19–21 June 1951

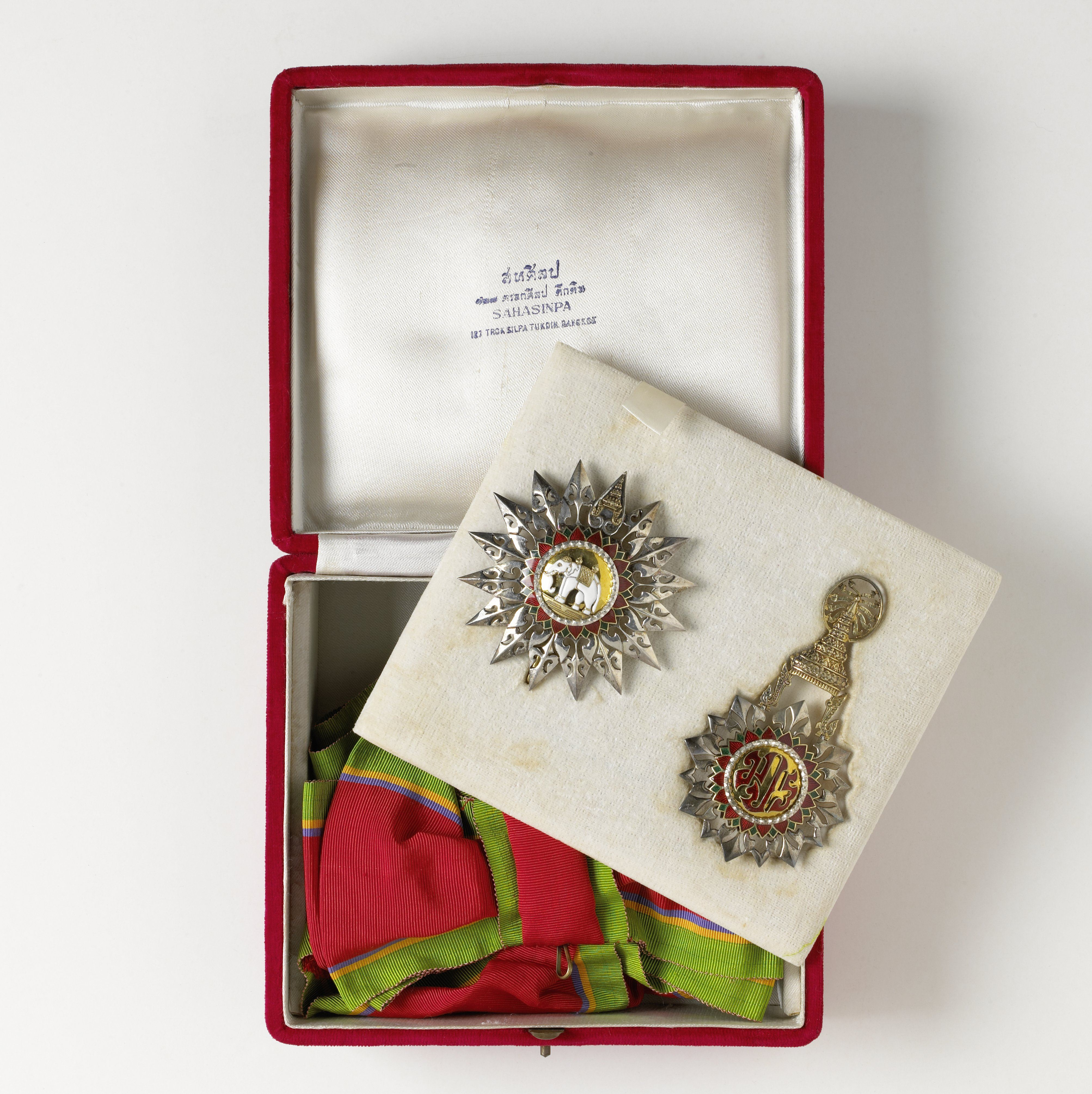
The Grand Cross of the Order of the White Elephant, conferred on Drees by King Bhumipol Adulyadej of Thailand on 26 September 1955

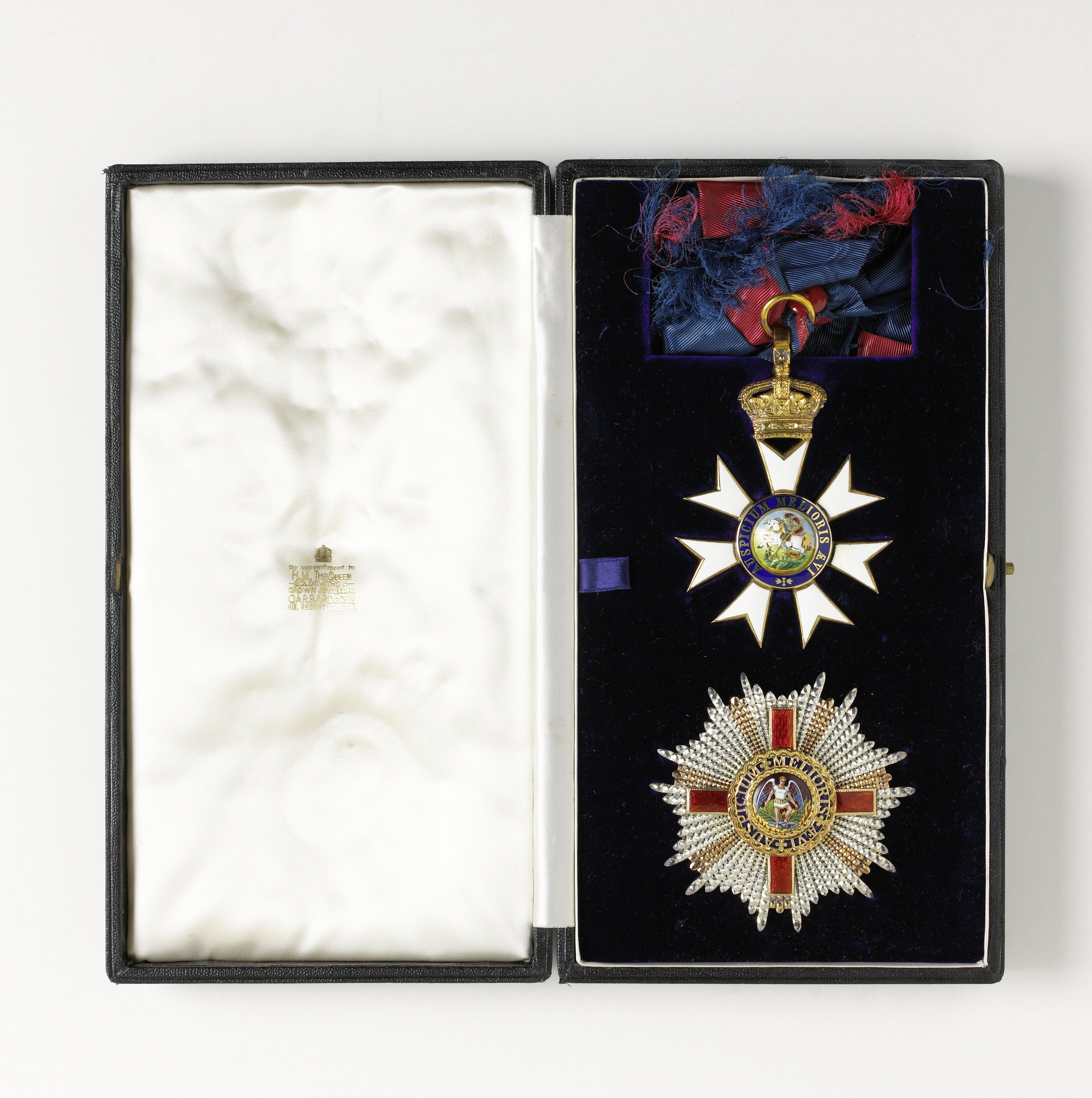
Drees' GCMG insignia awarded by Queen Elizabeth II during her state visit to the Netherlands, on 24 July 1958

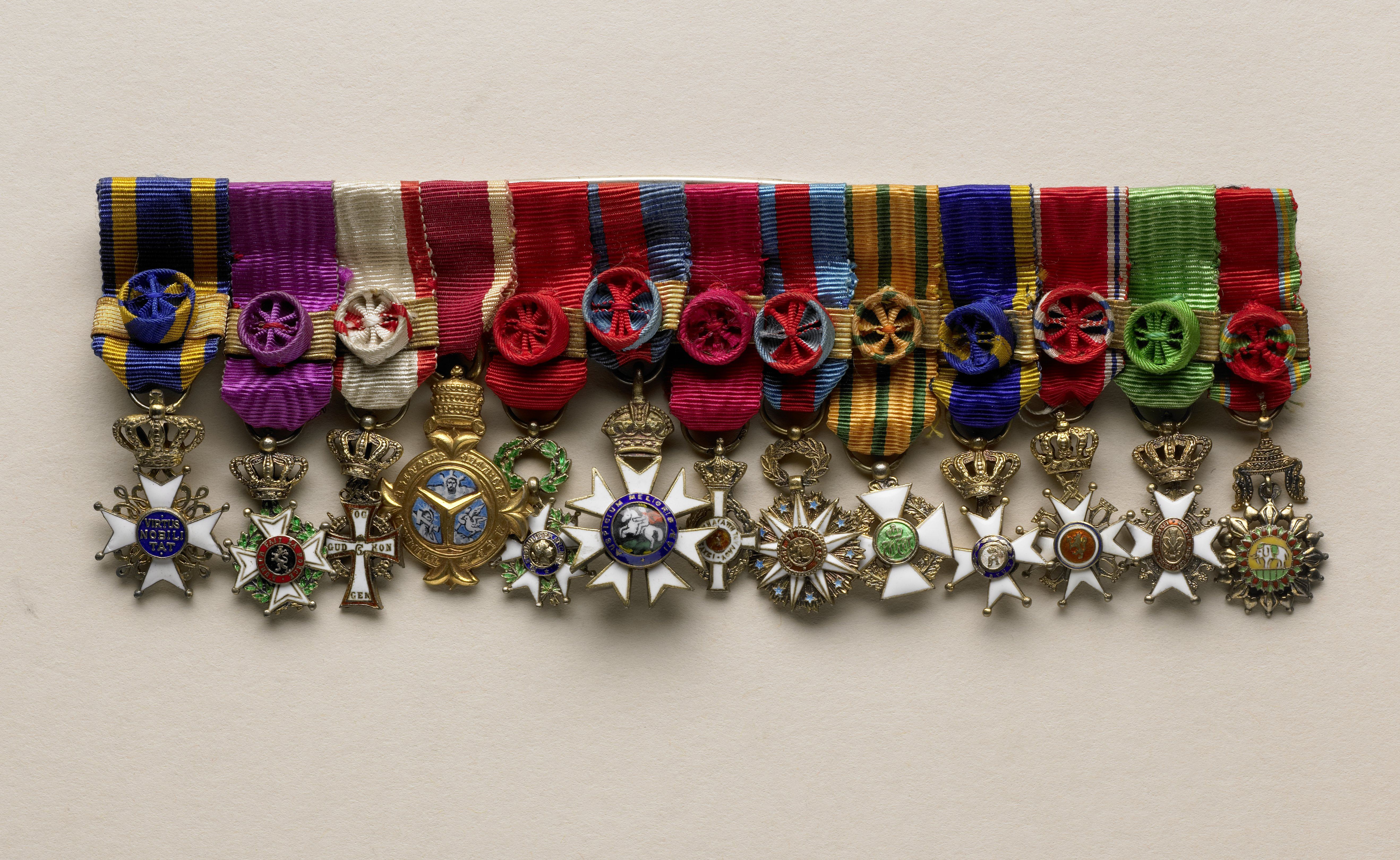
Miniature medal bar of Drees, showing all of his foreign and domestic decorations, as well as the grade

Party political offices
Preceded by Willem Albarda	Parliamentary leader of the Social Democratic Workers' Party in the House of Representatives; 1939–1945	Succeeded by Marinus van der Goes van Naters
Preceded by Willem Albarda	Leader of the Social; Democratic Workers' Party; 1940–1946	Party merged into the Labour Party
New political party	Leader of the Labour Party; 1946–1958	Succeeded by Jaap Burger
New political party	Lead candidate of the Labour Party; 1946, 1948, 1952, 1956; With: Jaap Burger (1946, 1948); Marinus van der Goes van Naters (1946, 1948)	Succeeded by Jaap Burger; Ko Suurhoff; Anne Vondeling (1959)
Political offices
New office	Deputy Prime Minister; 1945–1948	Succeeded by Josef van Schaik
Preceded by Dolf Joekes	Minister of Social Affairs; 1945–1948	Succeeded by Frans Wijffels
Preceded by Louis Beel	Prime Minister of the Netherlands; Minister of General Affairs; 1948–1958	Succeeded by Louis Beel
Preceded by Johan van Maarseveen	Minister of Colonial Affairs; Ad interim 1951	Succeeded by Leonard Peters
Preceded by Piet Lieftinck	Minister of Finance; Ad interim 1952	Succeeded by Jo van de Kieft
Records
Preceded by Celâl Bayar	Oldest living state leader 22 August 1986 – 14 May 1988	Succeeded by Naruhiko Higashikuni
