= First Drees cabinet =

Dutch cabinet, 1951 to 1952

First Drees cabinet Second Drees cabinet
- Cabinet of the Netherlands

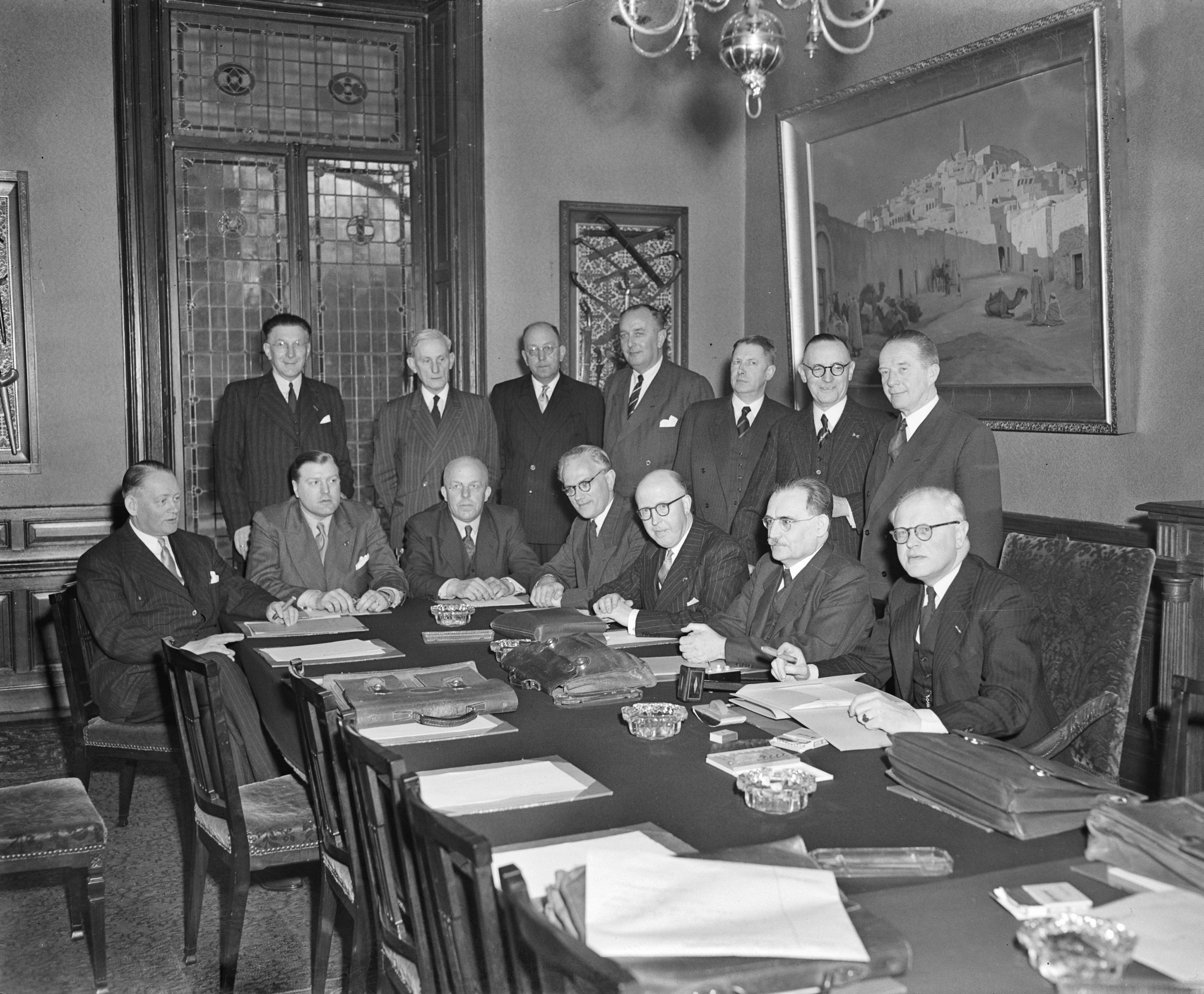
- The first meeting of the First Drees cabinet at the Ministry of General Affairs on 14 March 1951
- Date formed: 15 March 1951
- Date dissolved: 2 September 1952; 1 year, 171 days in office (Demissionary from 25 June 1952)

People and organisations
- Monarch: Queen Juliana
- Prime Minister: Willem Drees
- Deputy Prime Minister: Frans Teulings
- No. of ministers: 15
- Ministers removed: 2
- Total no. of members: 16
- Member party: Catholic People's Party (KVP); Labour Party (PvdA); Christian Historical Union (CHU); People's Party for Freedom and Democracy (VVD)
- Status in legislature: Centre-left; Majority government (Grand coalition/Roman-Red)

History
- Incoming formation: 1948 formation
- Outgoing formation: 1951 formation
- Outgoing election: 1952 election
- Legislature terms: 1948–1952
- Predecessor: Drees–Van Schaik cabinet
- Successor: Second Drees cabinet

The First Drees cabinet, also called the Second Drees cabinet was the executive branch of the Dutch Government from 15 March 1951 until 2 September 1952. The cabinet was a continuation of the previous Drees–Van Schaik cabinet and was formed by the christian-democratic Catholic People's Party (KVP) and Christian Historical Union (CHU), the social-democratic Labour Party (PvdA) and the conservative-liberal People's Party for Freedom and Democracy (VVD) after the fall of the previous cabinet. The cabinet was a centrist grand coalition and had a substantial majority in the House of Representatives with Labour Leader Willem Drees serving as Prime Minister. Prominent Catholic politician Frans Teulings the Minister of the Interior in the previous cabinet served as Deputy Prime Minister and Minister without portfolio for the Interior.

The cabinet served during early years of the turbulent 1950s. Domestically the recovery and rebuilding following World War II continued with the assistance of the Marshall Plan, it also able to finalize several major social reforms to social security, welfare, child benefits and education from the previous cabinet. Internationally the decolonization of the Dutch East Indies following the Indonesian National Revolution continued, the European Coal and Steel Community was founded after the signing of the Treaty of Paris. The cabinet suffered no major internal and external conflicts and completed its entire term and was succeeded by the Second Drees cabinet following the election of 1952.

== Cabinet Members ==
Ministers		Title/Ministry/Portfolio(s)			Term of office	Party
Willem Drees	Willem Drees (1886–1988)	Prime Minister	General Affairs		7 August 1948 – 22 December 1958^{[Retained]} ^{[Continued]}	Labour Party
Frans Teulings	Frans Teulings (1891–1966)	Deputy; Prime Minister	Interior	• Civil Defence	15 maart 1951 – 2 september 1952	Catholic; People's Party
Frans Teulings	Frans Teulings (1891–1966)	Minister	Interior	• Civil Defence	15 maart 1951 – 2 september 1952	Catholic; People's Party
Johan van Maarseveen	Johan van Maarseveen (1894–1951)	Minister	Interior		15 March 1951 – 18 November 1951^{[Died]}	Catholic; People's Party
Frans Teulings	Frans Teulings (1891–1966)	Minister	Interior		18 November 1951 – 6 December 1951^{[Ad Interim]}	Catholic; People's Party
Louis Beel	Dr. Louis Beel (1902–1977)	Minister	Interior		6 December 1951 – 7 July 1956^{[Continued]}	Catholic; People's Party
Dirk Stikker	Dirk Stikker (1897–1979)	Minister	Foreign Affairs		7 August 1948 – 2 September 1952^{[Retained]}	People's Party for Freedom and Democracy
Piet Lieftinck	Dr. Piet Lieftinck (1902–1989)	Minister	Finance		25 June 1945 – 1 July 1952^{[Retained]} ^{[App]}	Labour Party
Willem Drees	Willem Drees (1886–1988)	Minister	Finance		1 July 1952 – 2 September 1952^{[Acting]}	Labour Party
Hendrik Mulderije	Hendrik; Mulderije (1896–1970)	Minister	Justice		15 March 1951 – 2 September 1952	Christian; Historical Union
Jan van den Brink	Jan van den Brink (1915–2006)	Minister	Economic Affairs		21 January 1948 – 2 September 1952^{[Retained]}	Catholic; People's Party
Kees Staf	Kees Staf (1905–1973)	Minister	War and Navy		15 March 1951 – 19 May 1959^{[Continued]}	Christian; Historical Union
Dolf Joekes	Dr. Dolf Joekes (1885–1962)	Minister	Social Affairs		7 August 1948 – 15 September 1951^{[Retained]}	Labour Party
Dolf Joekes	Dr. Dolf Joekes (1885–1962)	Minister	Social Affairs and Health		15 September 1951 – 2 September 1952	Labour Party
Theo Rutten	Dr. Theo Rutten (1899–1980)	Minister	Education, Arts and Sciences		7 August 1948 – 2 September 1952^{[Retained]}	Catholic; People's Party
Hendrik Wemmers	Hendrik; Wemmers (1897–1983)	Minister	Transport and Water Management		15 March 1951 – 2 September 1952	Independent; Christian Democratic; Protestant
Sicco Mansholt	Sicco Mansholt (1908–1995)	Minister	Agriculture, Fisheries and Food Supplies		25 June 1945 – 1 January 1958^{[Retained]} ^{[Continued]}	Labour Party
Joris in 't Veld	Dr. Joris in 't Veld (1895–1981)	Minister	Reconstruction and Housing		1 March 1948 – 2 September 1952^{[Retained]}	Labour Party
Willem Drees	Dr. Willem Drees (1886–1988)	Minister	Colonial Affairs		15 March 1951 – 30 March 1951^{[Ad Interim]}	Labour Party
Leo Peters	Leo Peters (1900–1984)	Minister	Colonial Affairs		30 March 1951 – 2 September 1952	Catholic; People's Party
Minister without portfolio		Title/Ministry/Portfolio(s)			Term of office	Party
Guus Albregts	Dr. Guus Albregts (1900–1980)	Minister	Interior	• Public; Organisations • Small and Medium-sized; Businesses	15 March 1951 – 2 September 1952	Catholic; People's Party
State Secretaries		Title/Ministry/Portfolio(s)			Term of office	Party
Nico Blom	Nico Blom (1899–1972)	State Secretary	Foreign Affairs	• Dutch East Indies	16 February 1950 – 2 September 1952^{[Retained]}	Independent; Conservative Liberal
Ferdinand Kranenburg	Ferdinand; Kranenburg (1911–1994)	State Secretary	War and Navy	• Army • Air Force	1 June 1951 – 1 June 1958^{[Continued]}	Labour Party
Harry Moorman	Vice admiral Harry Moorman (1899–1971)	State Secretary	War and Navy	• Navy	1 May 1949 – 19 May 1959^{[Retained]} ^{[Continued]}	Catholic; People's Party
Piet Muntendam	Dr. Piet Muntendam (1901–1986)	State Secretary	Social Affairs	• Primary; Healthcare • Elderly Care • Disability Policy	1 April 1950 – 15 September 1951^{[Retained]}	Labour Party
Piet Muntendam	Dr. Piet Muntendam (1901–1986)	State Secretary	Social Affairs and Health	• Primary; Healthcare • Elderly Care • Disability Policy	15 September 1951 – 1 October 1953^{[Continued]}	Labour Party
Aat van Rhijn	Dr. Aat van Rhijn (1892–1986)	State Secretary	Social Affairs	• Social Security • Unemployment • Occupational; Safety • Social Services	15 February 1950 – 15 September 1951^{[Retained]}	Labour Party
Aat van Rhijn	Dr. Aat van Rhijn (1892–1986)	State Secretary	Social Affairs and Health	• Social Security • Unemployment • Occupational; Safety • Social Services	15 September 1951 – 22 December 1958^{[Continued]}	Labour Party
Jo Cals	Jo Cals (1914–1971)	State Secretary	Education, Arts and Sciences	• Youth Care • Nature • Media • Culture • Art • Recreation • Sport	15 March 1950 – 2 September 1952^{[Retained]}	Catholic; People's Party
Lubbertus Götzen	Lubbertus Götzen (1894–1979)	State Secretary	Colonial Affairs	• Netherlands- Indonesian Union • Colonial; Fiscal Policy	15 March 1951 – 2 September 1952	Independent; Christian Democratic; Protestant

^{Resigned}
^{Retained from the previous cabinet}
^{Continued in the next cabinet}
^{Acting}
^{Ad Interim}
^{Died in Office}
^{Appointed as Special Representative of the World Bank}

== Trivia ==
- Nine cabinet members had previous experience as scholars and professors: Louis Beel (Administrative Law), Piet Lieftinck (Financial and Business Economics), Jan van den Brink (Public Economics and Economical Statistics), Dolf Joekes (Labour Law), Theo Rutten (Applied Psychology), Joris in 't Veld (Public Administration), Guus Albregts (International Economics), Piet Muntendam (Social Medicine) and Aat van Rhijn (Fiscal Law).
