= Dirk Spitzen =

Dutch politician

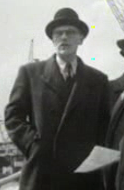
Mr. D.G.W. Spitzen

Dirk Gerard Willem Spitzen (18 March 1896, Wageningen – 26 January 1957, The Hague) was a Dutch politician.
