= Carel Goseling =

Dutch lawyer and politician

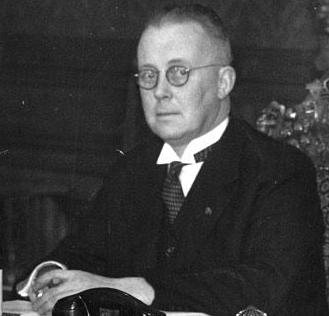
Carel Goseling

Carolus Maria Joannes Franciscus (Carel) Goseling (10 June 1891, Amsterdam – 14 April 1941, Buchenwald) was a Dutch lawyer and politician for the Roman Catholic State Party (RKSP).

Goseling was a member of the House of Representatives from 1929 to 1937 and subsequently Minister of Justice from 1937 to 1939.

He died aged 49 in Buchenwald concentration camp.

== Decorations ==
- Knight of the Order of the Netherlands Lion
