= Government of Rotterdam =

Dutch municipal government

Rotterdam City Council Gemeenteraad van Rotterdam
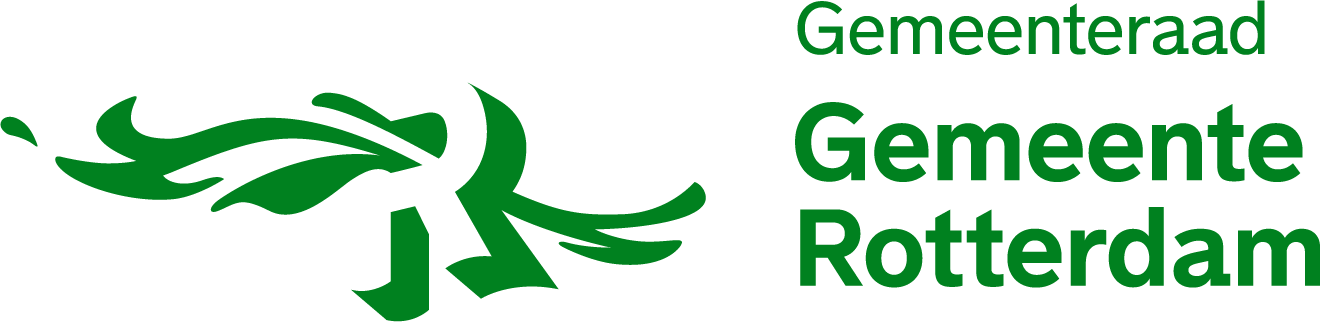

Type
- Type: City Council

Leadership
- Chairperson: Mayor of Rotterdam

Structure
- Seats: 45
- Political groups: Incoming Government (23): PRO (11); D66 (5); VVD (5); CDA (1); Volt (1); Opposition (22): Livable Rotterdam (11); DENK (4); FvD (2); PvdD (1); 50PLUS (1); CU (1); SP (1); BIJ1 (1)

Elections
- Last election: 2026
- Next election: 2030

Meeting place
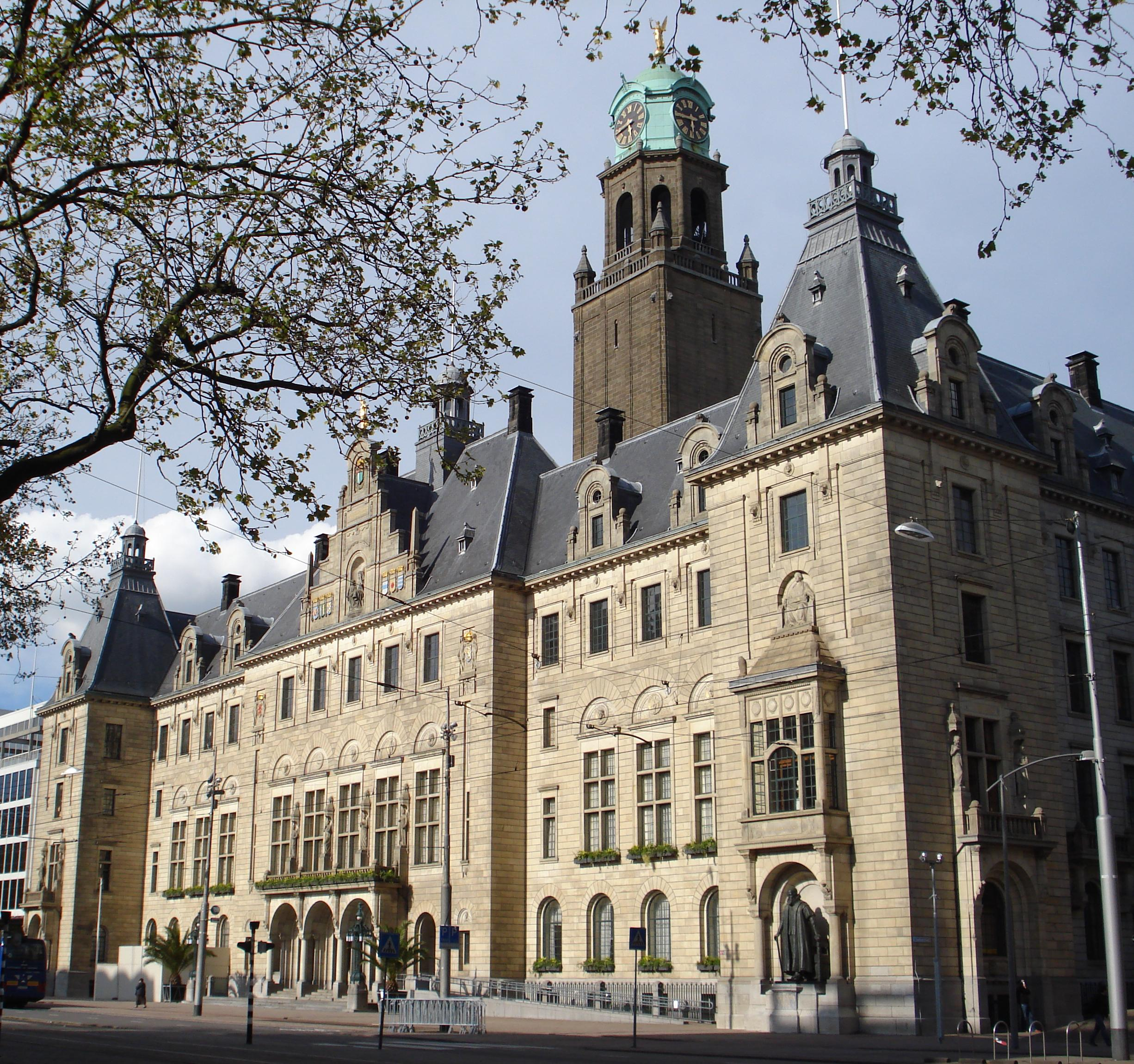
- Rotterdam City Hall

Website
- Official website

The Government of Rotterdam is the government of the municipality and city of Rotterdam in the Netherlands. Most of the inhabitants live in the city of Rotterdam, but the municipality also covers a number of small villages, and other parts of the local government, such as Rozenburg, cover an even larger area.

== City council ==
Results of the elections of 2002, 2006, 2010, 2014, 2018, 2022, and 2026

City council seats
Party	% 2002	% 2006	% 2010	% 2014	% 2018	% 2022	% 2026	S. 2002	S. 2006	S. 2010	S. 2014	S. 2018	S. 2022	S. 2026
PRO							20.5							11
LR	34.7	29.7	28.6	27.5	20.5	20.1	20.5	17	14	14	14	11	10	11
D66	5.1	2.2	9.3	12.7	9.9	9.9	10.7	2	1	4	6	5	5	5
VVD	9.8	6.2	9.6	7.5	10.7	11.3	9.6	4	3	4	3	5	6	5
DENK					7.4	7.8	8.8					4	4	4
FVD						2.3	4.8						1	2
CDA	11.3	7.7	6.7	5.9	4.7	2.9	3.4	5	3	3	3	2	1	1
PvdD				2.5	3.5	4.3	3.0				1	1	2	1
Volt						5.2	2.9						2	1
50+					3.2	3.6	2.6					1	1	1
CU/SGP ¹	2.7	2.4	3.0	3.2	3.0	3.4	2.4	1	1	1	1	1	1	1
SP	4.0	6.6	5.6	10.5	4.9	2.9	2.4	1	3	2	5	2	1	1
BIJ1						4.1	2.0						2	1
GreenLeft	6.5	4.3	7.3	4.9	9.9	10.0		3	2	3	2	5	5	
PvdA	22.4	37.4	28.9	15.8	9.7	8.6		11	18	14	8	5	4	
NIDA				4.8	5.4							2	2	
PVV						3.5							1	
Cityparty Rotterdam	2.5	1.0						1	0					
Others	1.0	2.5	1.1	4.6	4.2	3.5	4.9	0	0	0	0	0	0	0
Turnout	54.8	57.8	46.0	45.1	46.7	38.9	40.6							
Seats								45	45	45	45	45	45	45

¹ In 2022 only CU.

== City executive ==
=== City executive 2002–2006 ===
Pim Fortuyn of Leefbaar Rotterdam (right-wing populistic) won the elections on 6 March 2002 with 17 seats and formed a new coalition with the CDA (Christian democratic) and VVD (liberal) that unseated the PvdA (labour) which had ruled Rotterdam for decades. Only three months to the day later he was assassinated.

=== City executive 2006–2010 ===
The coalition mayor and aldermen for the period 2006-2010 was formed by a coalition of the parties PvdA (labour), CDA (Christian democratic), VVD (liberal) and GroenLinks (green left). The college was sworn in on May 18, 2006.

The college since its inauguration in 2006 had a number of cycles. VVD alderman Roelf de Boer retreated from his position in 2007. In 2008, GreenLeft alderman Orhan Kaya was replaced by Rik Grashoff. In April 2009 VVD left the coalition, though it retained a slim majority of 23 of the 45 seats. The two VVD aldermen Jeannette Baljeu and Mark Harbers were replaced by CDA and PvdA aldermen. This left the CDA with three council seats and three aldermen, a remarkable situation. In July 2009 CDA alderman Leonard Geluk joined the coalition but he stepped down prematurely, because of his new position as chairman of ROC Netherlands.

=== City executive 2010–2014 ===
The city board of mayor and aldermen was formed by four parties: PvdA (labour), VVD (conservative-liberal), D66 (social-liberal), and CDA (Christian-democratic).

Aldermen were: Jeannette Baljeu, Hugo de Jonge, Hamit Karakus, Jantine Kriens, Antoinette Laan and Korrie Louwes (Dominic Schrijer resigned on May 17, 2011).

=== City executive 2014–2018 ===
The city board of mayor and aldermen was formed by three parties: Leefbaar Rotterdam (right-wing populistic), D66 (social-liberal), and CDA (Christian-democratic).

Aldermen were: Joost Eerdmans, Hugo de Jonge, Pex Langenberg, Ronald Schneider, Maarten Struijvenberg and Adriaan Visser.

=== City executive 2018–2022 ===
The city board of mayor and aldermen was formed by seven parties: VVD (conservative liberal), D66 (social liberal), GL (green left), PvdA (social democratic), CDA (Christian democratic), and CU-SGP (conservative Christian).

Alder(wo)men were:

1. Judith Bokhove (GL)
2. Arno Bonte (GL)
3. Christine Eskes (CDA) - replacement of Sven de Langen
4. Arjan van Gils (D66)
5. Michiel Grauss (CU-SGP)
6. Vincent Karremans (VVD) - replacement of Bert Wijbenga
7. Said Kasmi (D66)
8. Bas Kurvers (VVD)
9. Richard Moti (PvdA)
10. Roos Vermeij (PvdA) - replacement of Barbara Kathmann

=== City executive 2022–2026 ===
In 2022, Leefbaar Rotterdam (right-wing populistic) have again won the elections and have formed a coalition with VVD (conservative liberal), D66 (social liberal) and DENK (multicultural).

=== City executive 2026-2030 ===
After the 2026 municipal elections, PRO became the largest party in Rotterdam, closely followed by Leefbaar Rotterdam, both winning 11 seats in the Rotterdam Municipal Council. A coalition of PRO (progressivism), D66 (social liberal), VVD (conservative liberal), CDA (christian democratic) and Volt (European federalism) was formed in the aftermath. From 9 July 2026, the college of mayor and aldermen will be as follows:

Name	Party	Portfolio
Carola Schouten	CU	Mayor; Chairwoman of the College, President of the Council, Public Order and Security, International Relations, Governance, City Marketing and Communication
Jeroen Postma	PRO	Alderman; Youth care, education and sport
Sabine Biesheuvel	PRO	Alderwoman; Climate and outdoor space
Miriam Harika	PRO	Alderwoman; Work & income and poverty reduction
Astrid Kockelkoren	PRO	Alderwoman; Housing, National Program Rotterdam South (NPRZ) and homelessness
Eva Heijblom	D66	Alderwoman; Culture and mobility
Chantal Zeegers	D66	Alderwoman; Building and living together
Diederik van Dommelen	VVD	Alderman; Finance, real estate, major projects and enforcement
Tim Accelerates	VVD	Alderman; Port, economy and small nuclei
René Segers-Hoogendoorn	CDA	Alderman; Care, well-being and social basis
Luuc Dekkers	Volt	Alderman; Digitalization, services, governance and European Affairs

== Mayors ==
The mayor (of Rotterdam) is part of the city executive and chairs the city council. Current mayor is Carola Schouten (CU).

Mayors since World War II:

- Pieter Oud (1945–1952)
- Gerard van Walsum (1952–1965)
- Wim Thomassen (1965–1974)
- André van der Louw (1974–1981)
- Bram Peper (1982–1998)
- Ivo Opstelten (1999–2009)
- Ahmed Aboutaleb (2009–2024)
- Carola Schouten (2024–present)

== Boroughs ==
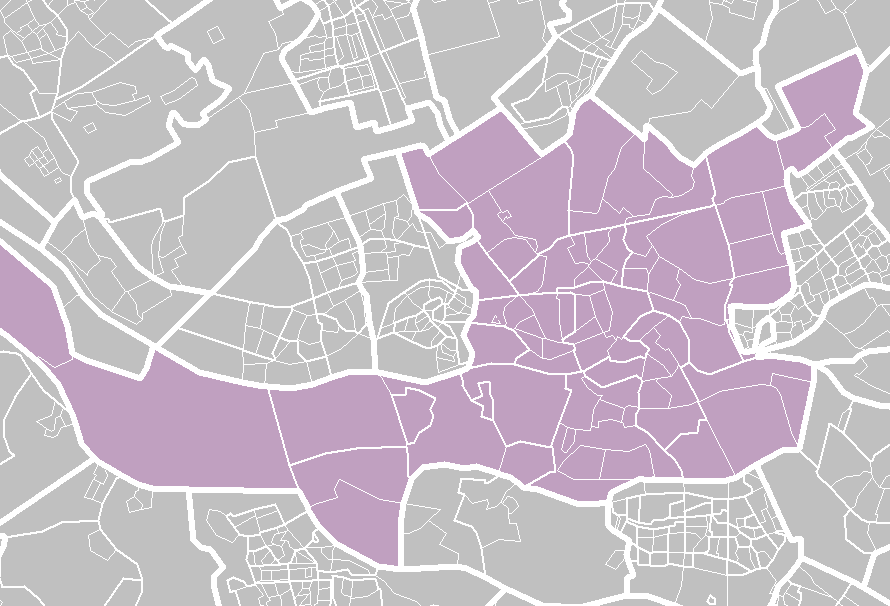
Rotterdam boroughs and neighborhoods.

Until 19 March 2014, Rotterdam's fourteen boroughs had the formal status of submunicipalities (deelgemeenten) under the Dutch Municipalities Act. The submunicipalities were responsible for many activities that previously had been run by the central city. The idea was to bring the government closer to the people. All submunicipalities had their own deelgemeenteraad ('submunicipal council'), direct elected by the borough's inhabitants. The district councils enjoyed far-reaching autonomous decisionmaking powers in many policy areas. Only affairs pertaining the whole city such as major infrastructural projects remained within the jurisdiction of by the central municipal council.

In 2014, the submunicipalities were abolished by law, but Rotterdam maintained its boroughs. The district councils were replaced with smaller, but still directly elected gebiedscommissies ('area committees'). The area committees no longer have autonomous powers, but instead act primarily as advisory and participatory bodies for the central municipal council.

The fourteen boroughs of Rotterdam are:

- Centrum
- Charlois
- Delfshaven
- Feijenoord
- Hillegersberg-Schiebroek
- Hoogvliet
- Hook of Holland
- IJsselmonde
- Kralingen-Crooswijk
- Noord
- Overschie
- Pernis
- Prins Alexander
- Rozenburg

The port areas are governed directly by the central municipality.

=== Annexations and reclassifications ===
The city of Rotterdam was especially strong growth since 1850. Initially they tried to accommodate the population within existing municipal boundaries, but this soon proved inadequate. Therefore, sequentially neighboring municipalities annexed or she had to cede territory to Rotterdam. An overview of these annexations and reclassifications:

- 1816 municipality Cool annexed.
- 1870 won territory of the municipalities Charlois, IJsselmonde and Katendrecht* serving ports and urban expansion on the current Kop van Zuid.
- 1886: annexation of the town Delfshaven (13,651 inhabitants)
- 1895: annexation of municipalities Charlois (12,154 inhabitants) and Kralingen (21,132 inhabitants), also won territory of the municipalities IJsselmonde and Overschie
- 1903 won territory of the municipality Overschie
- 1904 won territory of the municipality Hillegersberg
- 1909 won territory of the municipality of Schiedam
- 1914 won territory of the municipalities 's-Gravenzande (Hook of Holland village, population 2964), Naaldwijk and Rozenburg
- 1926 won territory of the municipality of Schiedam
- 1934: annexation of municipalities Hoogvliet (1331 inhabitants) and Pernis** (4988 inhabitants), also won territory of the municipalities Poortugaal, Rhoon and Schiedam
- 1939 won territory of the municipalities 's-Gravenzande and Naaldwijk
- 1940 won territory of the municipalities Schiedam and Overschie
- 1941: annexation of municipalities Hillegersberg (25,638 inhabitants), IJsselmonde (9183 inhabitants), Overschie (11,639 inhabitants) and Schiebroek (8030 inhabitants), also territories from the municipalities of Barendrecht, Berkel en Rodenrijs, Capelle aan den IJssel, Kethel en Spaland (both annexed by Schiedam), Rozenburg, Schiedam and Vlaardingen
- 1953 won and lost territory to the municipality of Schiedam
- 1966 won territory of the municipalities of Geervliet, Heenvliet, Rozenburg, Spijkenisse and Zwartewaal serving the Europoort
- 1972 won and lost territory to the municipality Oostvoorne and won territory of the State (North) serving the Maasvlakte
- 1976 won and lost territory to the municipality Rhoon
- 1978 won and lost territory to the municipality Capelle aan den IJssel and territory from the municipality of Zevenhuizen
- 1980 won territory of the municipalities of Brielle, Rozenburg and Oostvoorne
- 1985 won territory of the municipalities and Poortugaal, Rozenburg (new housing east of Hoogvliet, 17,032 inhabitants) and lost to the municipality Albrandswaard (which was recorded simultaneously Poortugaal)
- 1995 won territory of the municipalities of Nieuwerkerk aan den IJssel and Zevenhuizen-Moerkapelle serving the Vinex Nesselande district, also lost territory to Ridderkerk
- 1997 won territory of the municipality of Capelle aan den IJssel
- 2001 won and lost territory to the municipality Capelle aan den IJssel
- 2010: annexation of the town Rozenburg (ca. 12,500 inhabitants).

* The municipality Katendrecht in 1873 annexed by the municipality Charlois

** The city annexed Pernis in 1834 the town 's-Gravenambacht

== International relations ==
Rotterdam has the following city and port connections throughout the world:

- 14 sister cities
- 13 partner cities
- 4 sister ports

=== Twin towns – sister cities ===
Rotterdam is twinned with:

- Cologne, Germany 1958
- Esch-sur-Alzette, Luxembourg 1958
- Lille, France 1958
- Turin, Italy 1958
- Liège, Belgium 1958
- Burgas, Bulgaria 1976
- Constanța, Romania 1976
- Gdańsk, Poland 1977
- Shanghai, China 1979
- Havana, Cuba 1983
- Saint Petersburg, Russia 1966
- (United States) Baltimore, Maryland, USA 1985
- Las Palmas de Gran Canaria, Spain
- Dresden, Germany 1988
- Istanbul, Turkey 2005
- Surabaya, Indonesia
- Szeged, Hungary
- Kuching, Malaysia

=== Partner cities ===
- Hull, United Kingdom 1936
- Antwerp, Belgium 1940
- Basel, Switzerland 1945
- Oslo, Norway 1945
- Duisburg, Germany 1950
- Nuremberg, Germany 1961
- Jakarta, Indonesia 1983
- Osaka, Japan 1984
- Budapest, Hungary 1991
- Bratislava, Slovakia 1991
- Durban, South Africa 1991
- Prague, Czech Republic 1991
- Buenos Aires, Argentina 1990

=== Sister ports ===
- Kobe, Japan 1967
- (United States) Seattle, Washington USA 1969 ^{Seattle List}
- Busan, South Korea 1987
- Tokyo, Japan 1989
