= Joris in 't Veld =

Dutch politician (1895–1981)

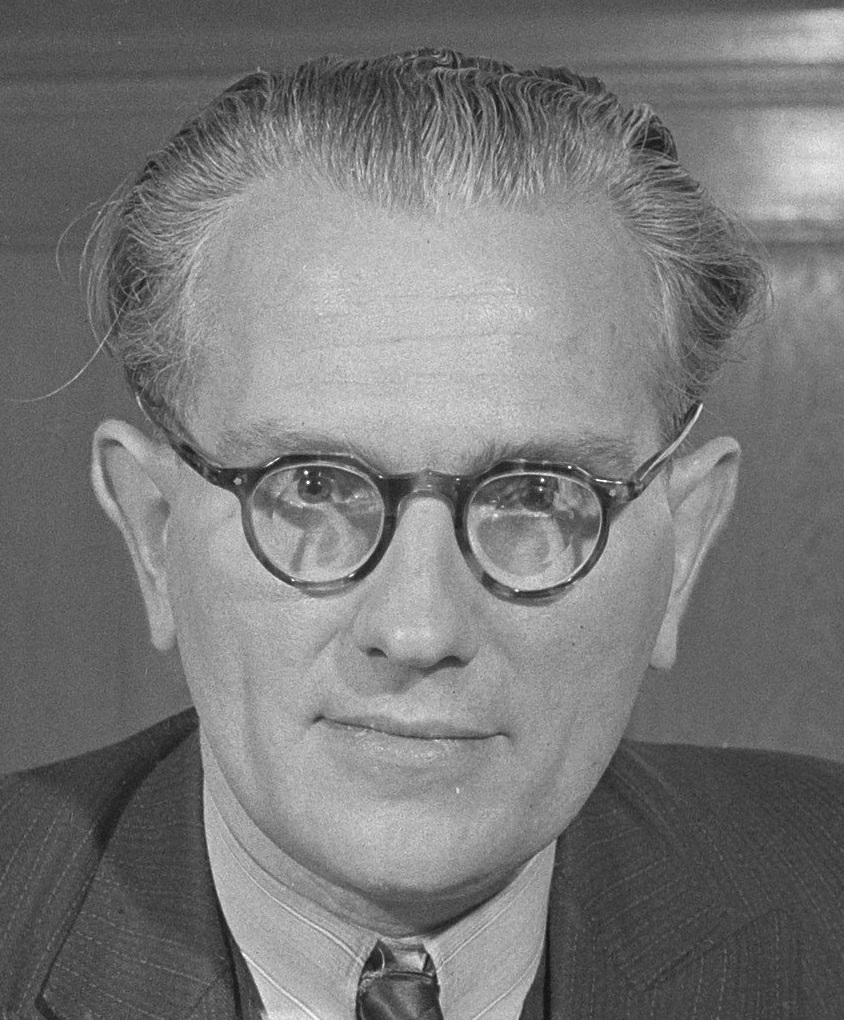
- Joris in 't Veld in 1945

Member of the Council of State
- In office 1 October 1964 – 1 August 1970
- Vice President: Louis Beel

Parliamentary leader in the Senate
- In office 2 September 1952 – 15 November 1960
- Preceded by: Kees Woudenberg
- Succeeded by: Maarten de Niet; Gerritzoon
- Parliamentary group: Labour Party

Minister of Reconstruction and Housing
- In office 1 March 1948 – 2 September 1952
- Prime Minister: Louis Beel (1948); Willem Drees (1948–1952)
- Preceded by: Lambertus Neher
- Succeeded by: Herman Witte

Member of the Senate
- In office 15 July 1952 – 1 October 1964
- In office 28 July 1948 – 8 August 1948
- In office 8 June 1937 – 3 March 1948
- Parliamentary group: Labour Party (1946–1964); Social Democratic; Workers' Party (1937–1946)

Mayor of Zaandam
- In office 7 May 1945 – 1 March 1948
- Preceded by: Hendrik Vitters
- Succeeded by: Wim Thomassen
- In office 1 January 1937 – 4 March 1941
- Preceded by: Kornelis ter Laan
- Succeeded by: Cornelis van Ravenswaay

Personal details
- Born: Joris in 't Veld; 5 July 1895 Dubbeldam, Netherlands
- Died: 15 February 1981 (aged 85) The Hague, Netherlands
- Party: Labour Party (from 1946)
- Other political affiliations: Social Democratic; Workers' Party (1918–1946)
- Spouses: Antje Peeters (m. 1922; died 1966) Ellen ten Brink (m. 1966)
- Children: Jan in 't Veld (1925–2005) and 2 daughters
- Education: Leiden University (Bachelor of Laws, Master of Laws, Doctor of Law)
- Occupation: Politician · Civil servant · Jurist · Researcher · Corporate director · Nonprofit director · Academic administrator · Media administrator · Author · Professor

Joris in 't Veld (5 July 1895 – 15 February 1981) was a Dutch politician of the Social Democratic Workers' Party (SDAP) and later the Labour Party (PvdA) and jurist.

In 't Veld worked as civil servant for municipality of Dordrecht from August 1910 until October 1914 and for the municipality of Rotterdam from October 1914 until December 1936 as Municipal clerk from January 1936 until December 1936. In 't Veld applied at the Leiden University in June 1921 majoring in Law and obtaining a Bachelor of Laws degree in July 1923 and worked as a student researcher before graduating with a Master of Laws degree in July 1926 and later got a doctorate as a Doctor of Law on 1 July 1929. In 't Veld served on the Provincial-Council of South Holland from June 1931 until January 1937. In December 1936 In 't Veld was nominated as Mayor of Zaandam, taking office on 1 January 1937. In 't Veld was elected as a Member of the Senate after the Senate election of 1937, taking office on 8 June 1937. On 10 May 1940 Nazi Germany invaded the Netherlands and the government fled to London to escape the German occupation. During World War II In 't Veld continued to serve as a Member of the Senate but in reality the de facto political influence of the Senate was marginalized. On 4 March 1941 In 't Veld was removed from office as Mayor by the German occupation authority.

Following the end of World War II In 't Veld was reinstated as Mayor of Zaandam, taking office on 7 May 1945. Following the return of the government-in-exile Queen Wilhelmina ordered a Recall of Parliament and In 't Veld remained a Member of the Senate, taking office on 20 November 1945. In 't Veld was appointed as Minister of Reconstruction and Housing in the Cabinet Beel I following the appointment of Lambertus Neher as Special Representative to the Dutch East Indies, taking office on 1 March 1948. After the Senate election of 1948 In 't Veld returned briefly as a Member of the Senate, serving from 28 July 1948 until 8 August 1948. After the election of 1948 In 't Veld continued as Minister of Reconstruction and Housing in the Cabinet Drees–Van Schaik, taking office on 7 August 1948. The Drees–Van Schaik cabinet fell on 24 January 1951 and continued to serve in a demissionary capacity until the cabinet formation of 1951 when it was replaced by Cabinet Drees I with In 't Veld remaining as Minister of Reconstruction and Housing, taking office on 15 March 1951. In April 1952 In 't Veld announced that he wouldn't stand for the election of 1952 but wanted tot return to the Senate. After the Senate election of 1952 In 't Veld returned as a Member of the Senate, taking office on 15 July 1952. After the election of 1952 In 't Veld was not giving a cabinet post in the new cabinet, the Cabinet Drees I was replaced by the Cabinet Drees II on 2 September 1952 and he subsequently was selected as Parliamentary leader of the Labour Party in the Senate the same day.

he also served as a Professor at Leiden University, Member of the Council of State, administer at Humanitas and the Humanistisch Verbond, and one of the founders of the public administration in the Netherlands. As Minister of Reconstruction and Public Housing in the first Beel cabinet and first Drees cabinet he established the Reconstruction Bill.

== Biography ==
In 't Veld was born in Dubbeldam (now part of Dordrecht), in the same village where his father Cornelis in 't Veld was born and had worked as labourer and later greengrocer. After attending the mulo (junior high school) he started working as civil servant in the town hall of Dordrecht. He continued his studies in his spare time completing the training for municipal candidate in 1916, and in 1921 passing the state examination. Beside his work he continued to study law at Leiden University from 1921 until 1926. On 11 July 1929 he obtained his doctorate in law at the Leiden University with a thesis entitled "Nieuwe vormen van decentralisatie." (New forms of decentralization).

After his first job at the municipality of Dordrecht from 1910 to 1914, he moved to Municipality of Rotterdam, where he initially start as clerk at Public Works. He gradually got promoted in the civil service until he became acting municipal secretary and head of the Housing Department from 1936 to 1937. A year later in 1937 he succeeded Kornelis ter Laan as mayor of Zaandam.

In addition to his personal career In 't Velds had gained interest in politics. As a young man he had certain sympathy for anarchism and communism, but he switched after Troelstra's failed revolution attempt in November 1918 and joined the Social Democratic Workers Party (SDAP). He was active in the local branch of the party and in the Institute for Development Workers, where late 1920s he chaired the Rotterdam Chapter. Late-1920s he became more active in the SDAP, and was elected Member of the Senate in 1931 and served until 1937.

Besides Mayor of Zaandam, In 't Veld was Member of the Senate just before and World War II, and from 1952 to 1964. In 1948 he became Minister of Reconstruction and Housing. After 1952, In 't Veld started his academic career. After holding a series of lectures on housing at the Institute of Social Studies in The Hague, he was included in the staff of this institution in 1954. In 1955 directed the faculty administration. From 1957 to 1965 he was Professor at the Leiden University.

=== Personal ===
In 1922 Joris married Antje Peeters, and they had a son and two daughters. His son was the Delft Professor Jan in 't Veld (1925–2005). A daughter Cornélie "Corrie" in 't Veld married Roel de Wit, Mayor of Alkmaar from 1970 until 1976 and the Queen's Commissioner of North Holland from 1976 until 1992. After the death of Antje Peeters in 1966, Joris in 't Veld remarried the same year with Ellen Elisabeth ten Brink.

He was made a Knight in the Order of the Dutch Lion in 1946, Commander of the Order of Orange Nassau in 1952, and Commander of the Order of the Dutch Lion in 1963.

== Work ==
=== Political career ===
In 't Veld was from 1931 to 1937 member of the Provincial Council of South Holland. In 1937 he became a member of the Senate for the SDAP. He was Minister of Reconstruction and Housing for the Labour Party in the first Beel cabinet and first Drees cabinet he established the Reconstruction Bill. He interpellated in 1953 as Minister Senator dark about the escape of seven war criminals. He was a moderate Orangist.

=== Mayor of Zaandam ===
In 't Veld mayor of Zaandam was from 1937 to 1941, and later from 1945 to 1948. After his first appearance in a relatively short time he acquired great popularity, particularly by his attitude during World War II. Conflicts with the Germans and especially the NSB were bound and on 4 March 1941, shortly after the February strike, followed his dismissal, he was succeeded by NSB mayor Cornelis van Ravenswaay. After the capitulation on 5 May 1945, he was immediately reinstalled as mayor. This continued until his appointment as Minister of Reconstruction and Housing. On his retirement in 1948, In 't Veld an honorary citizen of Zaandam, there was also a park named after him.

=== Minister of Reconstruction and Housing ===
As Minister of Reconstruction and Housing was in 't Veld the first postwar minister seriously interested in planning. The construction of new houses only slowly rose after World War II, partly due to the lack of good and affordable building material. In the 1930s In 't Veld as Minister of Housing had been spectre of mass unemployment and again feared for further unemployment in the construction industry. For this reason In 't Veld pleaded for a gradual approach to tackling the housing shortage. The policy of the government prioritised the construction of utilities for business.

Under his rule the houses production increased significantly but the housing shortage experience defy him and his successors. The homebuilding got under In 't Veld the highest priority and surpassed the 90,000 homes per year. However, the growth in demand exceeded supply, as the number of persons per household decreased. Many of the houses were built with a solid state.

=== Humanitas ===
Just after the war, the foundation Humanitas founded on 31 May 1945 and In 't Veld became its first president. He expressed the mission of Humanitas as "No help offered from above, but help born from a sense of solidarity, and responsibility for the needs of neighbours in distress." In 't Veld was himself a convinced modern humanist and from its founding until 1954 a member of the Executive Board of the Humanistisch Verbond (HV).

Under his chairmanship of Humanitas from 1945 to 1963 he has worked sought merger between the two organisations. In 't Veld was personally convinced that social work could only be fruitful when thrives are based on a philosophy of life. His plans for cooperation are torpedoed by the members and delegates at Humanitas conferences. Together with the politician and first president of the Humanistisch Verbond Jaap van Praag he kept promoting the idea of the Humanist Movement.

=== Public Administration ===
At older age In 't Veld regularly published articles on administrative law and administrative and political issues. He was an expert of constitutional and administrative law, and authored with H.A. Brasz and A. Kleijn the Inleiding tot de bestuurswetenschap (Introduction to Public Administration) and as sole author the 1979 Beginselen van behoorlijk bestuur (Principles of good governance). This book covered topics such as service quality, capacity, equality, trust, interests and motivation. In 't Veld proposed a classification, similar to the one by Belinfante in 1968, who defined:

- The principle that prohibits (apparent) partiality
- The obligation of hearing
- The obligation to state reasons
- The prohibition of arbitrary
- The prohibition of "détournement de pouvoir" (misuse of powers)
- The principle of legal certainty
- The principle of care
- And equality

The 1968 subdivision of In 't Veld was similar, only he conceived the principle of impartiality and the right to be heard together principle into the principle of "fair play."

== Publications ==
In 't Veld authored dozens of articles and books. A selection:

- 1929, Nieuwe vormen van decentralisatie
- 1932–34, De inrichting van onzen staat gezien van sociaaldemocratisch standpunt. Amsterdam.
- 1936, Nog steeds: naast de rode de blauwe vaan. Utrecht
- 1938, Bestuursinrichting van de Wieringermeer Alphen aan den Rijn
- 1945, Economische en sociale ordening. Amsterdam
- 1950, De betekenis der gemeente voor de toekomst van West-Europa. Heemstede
- 1953, Krotopruiming en vernieuwing van bebouwde kernen. 's-Gravenhage
- 1962, Inleiding tot de bestuurswetenschap with H.A. Brasz en A. Kleijn.
- 1968, Essays in administration. 's-Gravenhage
- 1970, Vooruitziende bestuurswetenschap. Een futurologische verkenning. 's-Gravenhage
- 1972, Ons staatsbestuur in een stroomversnelling, 's-Gravenhage.
- 1979, Beginselen van behoorlijk bestuur, Zwolle.
- 1980, Planning als maatschappelijke vormgeving, J. in 't Veld (red.). Deventer: Van Loghum Slaterus.

== Decorations ==
Honours
| Ribbon bar | Honour | Country | Date | Comment |
| | Commander of the Order of Orange-Nassau | Netherlands | 30 September 1952 | |
| | Commander of the Order of the Netherlands Lion | Netherlands | 30 April 1963 | Elevated from Knight (31 August 1946) |

Party political offices
| Preceded by Kees Woudenberg | Parliamentary leader of the Labour Party in the Senate; 1952–1960 | Succeeded by Maarten de Niet; Gerritzoon |
Political offices
| Preceded by Kornelis ter Laan | Mayor of Zaandam; 1937–1941; 1945–1948 | Succeeded by Cornelis van Ravenswaay |
| Preceded by Hendrik Vitters | Mayor of Zaandam; 1937–1941; 1945–1948 | Succeeded by Wim Thomassen |
| Preceded by Lambertus Neher | Minister of Reconstruction and Housing; 1948–1952 | Succeeded by Herman Witte |
Non-profit organization positions
| Preceded by Office established | Chairman of the Supervisory board of Humanitas; 1945–1963 | Unknown |
Media offices
| Unknown | Chairman of the Supervisory board of Radio Netherlands Worldwide; 1953–1964 | Unknown |
