= Sounds of Mexico =

Sounds of Mexico is a musical ensemble and exchange program created as a platform for collaboration between musicians from Mexico and those from other countries. This mostly occurs through the programming of concerts in various countries in which Mexican musicians collaborate with those of the host country. The projects and programs differ from country to country and the repertoire of pieces played varied widely, with many from modern composers. The goal is to create long term cultural relationships with various countries and to develop the Mexican musicians. The traditional music of Mexico is promoted as well.

The program was created in 2008 by Mexican composer and guitarist Santiago Gutiérrez Bolio with the Mexican embassy in Denmark. Today, it is co-directed by Mexican guitarist Santiago Lascurain. Other members include Matias Escudero Seibaek, Aldo Aranda, Carina Vinke, Allan Sjølin, Martin Buono, Almut Kühne, Joel Enrique González, Jaike Bakker, Carlos Iturralde, Alejandra Hernández, Jonas Skielboe, Oman Kaminsky, Juan Zurutuza, Manuel Esperilla, Mathilde Kirknaes, Tomás Barriero and Carlos Martínez Laurrari.

The program is supported by a number of private and governmental organizations such as Oticon Fonden, Danmarks Nationalbank, Rundetaarn, Hans Tausens Kirke and Dansk Musik Forbund in Denmark, Sibelius Academy in Finland, Stichting Colores de México, Geemente Den Haag, Prins Bernhard Cultuurfonds, Gemeente Rotterdam, Amsterdams Fonds voor de Kunst, SNS Reaal Fonds, De Haagse Kunstring, Het Wereldmuseum, Het Bethaniënklooster, Concertgebouw, AVRO Radio, Círculo Dilecto Radio, and English Breakfast Radio in the Netherlands, the Spanish Consulate in Reykjavík and Salurinn Tonilistarhus in Iceland, the Mexican Institute for Culture in Paris and Maison du Mexique in France, the Instituto Cervantes in Vienna, the Escuela de Música Luis Aramburu in Spain and Clásica México in Mexico, and the Mexican embassies to Denmark, Norway, Iceland, Finland, Austria and the Netherlands.

The first concerts were held in Copenhagen in 2008. Since then the program as presented concerts in various countries and cites such as the major cities of Denmark, Finland, France, Holland, Iceland and Switzerland and has commissioned new musical works.

One jointly created program is Lige over Vandet/Océanos Cruzados (Over the Ocean in Danish and Spanish) which was created musicians from Mexico and Denmark to create a musical and dance spectacle dominated by guitars and percussion. The music and dance blends the contemporary traditions of both countries. Compositions created for the show include Tres de masita, 4 pieces for 2 guitars, Vacuum’s Vessels, Shine, Sr.?, I Ching (The Book of Changes) and Más Música Mística. The last piece was inspired by the work of Max Jardow-Pederson, a Danish ethnologist specializing in music who worked in the Yucatán Peninsula investigating Mayan music. Most pieces are for guitar, sometimes accompanied by percussion and other instruments, and have elements flamenco, choral music, tango, rock and blues. One recent performance of this show was at the Festival Internacional Cervantino, as Denmark was one of the “guests” for the event.
