= Maurice Meeuwissen =

Dutch politician

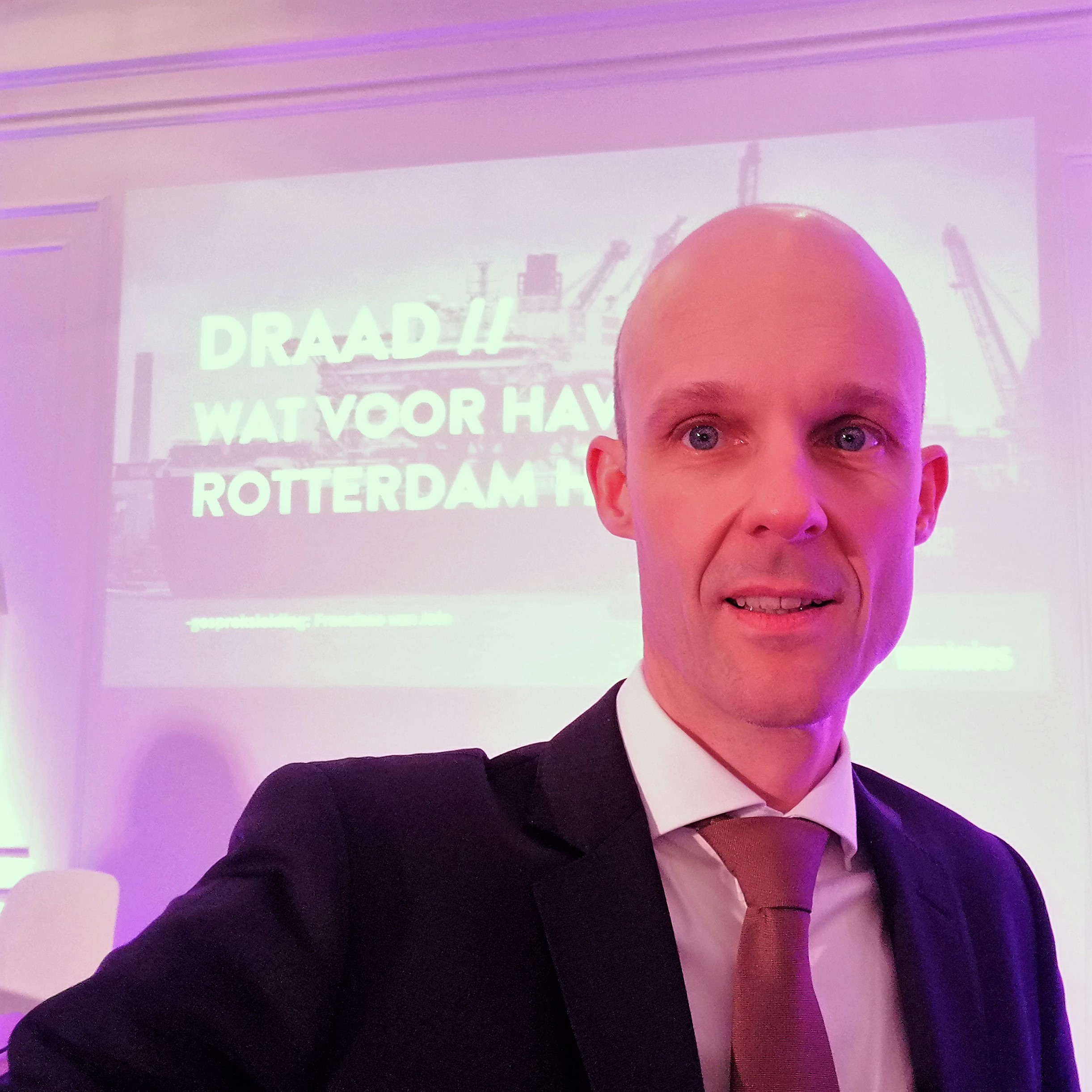

Member of the States of South Holland
- Incumbent
- Assumed office 20 March 2019

Member of the Government of Rotterdam
- Incumbent
- Assumed office 21 March 2018

Personal details
- Born: Maurice Meeuwissen; 14 May 1969 (age 56) Maastricht, Netherlands
- Party: Party for Freedom
- Occupation: Politician, engineer

Maurice Meeuwissen (born 14 May 1969) is a Dutch politician and member of the Party for Freedom.

Meeuwissen served as an officer in the Dutch army before studying for a degree in mechanical engineering at Delft University of Technology. Furthermore, Meeuwissen worked as an engineer in the IT and telecom industries before obtaining a Master's degree in healthcare management at Erasmus University Rotterdam. Meeuwissen became the leader and spokesman for the PVV in South Holland and was elected to the States of South Holland during the 2019 Dutch provincial elections. Since 2018 he has also been a municipal councilor in the Municipal council of Rotterdam where he forms a one man faction for the PVV.
