= Pieter Droogleever Fortuyn =

Dutch football executive

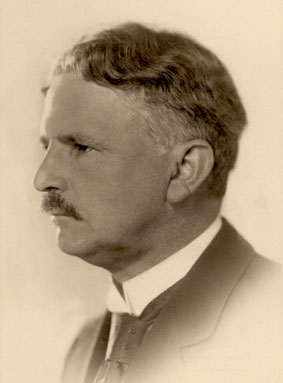
- Pieter Droogleever Fortuyn

2nd President of the Royal Dutch Football Association
- In office 1892–1893
- Preceded by: Pim Mulier
- Succeeded by: W. Prange

Mayor of Rotterdam
- In office 1928–1938
- Preceded by: Johannes Wytema
- Succeeded by: Pieter Oud
- Born: Pieter Droogleever Fortuijn; 28 December 1868; Rotterdam, Netherlands
- Died: 6 September 1938 (aged 69); The Hague, Netherlands
- Citizenship: Dutch
- Occupations: Football executive; Businessman; Liberal municipal administrator
- Known for: Mayor of Rotterdam and President of the Royal Dutch Football Association

Pieter Droogleever Fortuyn (28 December 1868 – 6 September 1938) was a wealthy Dutch businessman and liberal municipal administrator from an old patrician family, in the first half of the 20th century.

After grammar school, he studied law in Leiden, which was concluded in 1894. After having been a lawyer and bank manager, he became an alderman for public housing in The Hague. In that position, he advocated, among other things, the construction of the Zuiderpark. He became a member of the House of Representatives in 1925 and in 1928 he succeeded the suddenly deceased Johannes Wytema as mayor of Rotterdam. At the same time, he was also a member of the Senate for three years, until his death in 1938, a combination of functions that were not uncommon until the 1960s. He was highly respected by political opponents in both The Hague and Rotterdam. As VNG chairman he was a powerful fighter for municipal autonomy.

He was also a football enthusiast, being one of the founders of what would later become the Royal Dutch Football Association (KNVB), which he served as a chairman in 1892–93. In 1937 he kicked off the first game in De Kuip, after he had already opened the Zuiderpark Stadion with a kick-off in 1925.

== Early life and education ==
Pieter Droogleever Fortuijn was born on 28 December 1868 in Rotterdam as the son of Lambertus Droogleever Fortuijn, a banker, and Maria Catharina Kalishoek. His name was changed from "Fortuijn" to "Fortuyn" by order of the District Court in Rotterdam dated 28 June 1912.

Droogleever Fortuyn descended from a respectable family of prosperous businessmen with a university background, although Fortuyn's father was experiencing financial setbacks. After grammar school education in his hometown, he studied law in Leiden, which was concluded on 19 March 1894. In 1898 he was appointed director of the Municipal Mortgage Bank, of which he was one of the founders, since his family had always shown a great deal of interest in this branch.

He married on 13 July 1895 to Hélène Bruinier. From this marriage, 3 daughters were born (Gerda, Elsje, and Ingeborg).

== Political career ==
In 1912, the 44-year-old Fortuyn became a member of the municipal council for the Liberal Union. After having been a lawyer and bank manager, he became an alderman in The Hague in 1913. His appointment as an alderman placed him in charge of the problems of food distribution during the war years. In 1919 he exchanged this portfolio with that of public works, urban development, and public housing. During this period, he was involved in two treatises in The Hague: The Land and housing policy of the Municipality of The Hague (1922) and The Organism of the City of The Hague (1923). Because of this aldermanship, Fortuyn was able to contribute strongly to the beautification of the city and he also advocated, among other things, the construction of the Zuiderpark because he recognized the importance of sport for education and public health. In 1923 he retired from the city council and made a long journey to East Asia. In 1925 he was elected to the House of Representatives, where his interest in Indies affairs, in particular, became apparent. His tactical prowess qualified him in 1925 for membership of a League of Nations commission charged with the task of investigating and resolving a serious border dispute between Bulgaria and Greece.

=== Mayor of Rotterdam ===
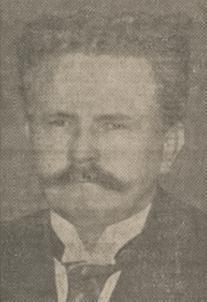
Pieter Droogleever Fortuyn.

Fortuyn was appointed mayor of Rotterdam in 1928, succeeding the suddenly deceased Johannes Wytema. Wytema's assumption of office had been burdened right from the start, not only because of his poor health, but also because of the memories of his predecessor, Alfred Rudolf Zimmerman, who had been an exceptionally able and powerful mayor. However, the benevolent, friendly Wytema turned out to have little resistance to a city council that was difficult to handle, in which a number of members in opposition, especially from the Rapalje party, made it very difficult for him. It is clear that the newly appointed mayor Droogleever Fortuyn was certainly not greeted with cheers. Various statements, such as "Rotterdam is not fond of intruders from The Hague", showed that the appointment of a representative of the numerically weak liberal movement was not much appreciated without consultation with the local groups. But the calm and controlled tactical behavior of Fortuyn changed the mood. The municipal council was brought back within the confines of a worthy administrative council, and a matter-of-fact perception of the task of administration became possible again. He was able to work effectively together with aldermen's teams that varied strongly according to political colour. This was all the more necessary because the international economic crisis, from which Rotterdam suffered so badly during this term of office, demanded the utmost competence of the administrative apparatus. Fortuyn contributed substantially to the improvement of the cross-river connection through the Maastunnel and, as an artistic man, contributed to the expansion of the Boymans Museum. Under his mayorship, various other major works were also completed, such as the construction of the current Feyenoord stadium De Kuip. The opening ceremony of the latter was held on 27 March 1937, and it was Fortuyn who spoke the opening speech in a microphone and then he kicked-off the first football match in the stadium.

The general success of Fortuyn's mayorship was demonstrated by his reappointment in 1934, despite being aged 66. As a dignified regent figure with a sense of humor and human knowledge, who also appreciated his political opponents, Droogleever Fortuyn made a substantial contribution to a municipal policy that, despite the economic crisis, could be appreciated positively. However, he would die before completing his second term in office.

During his mayorship, Fortuyn served the public interest in several other posts. He was a member of the Senate since 1932 and chairman of the Association of Dutch Municipalities. He showed himself to be a strong fighter for the autonomy of the municipalities. He also gave his powers to various companies as a supervisory director or in similar positions.

== Sporting career ==
In addition to politics, sports, especially football, also had a special place in his heart. As a young man, he did a lot as a player and board member for Rotterdam's RC & FC Concordia, and from there he was one of the founders of what would later become the Royal Dutch Football Association (KNVB). When the entity's first chairman, Pim Mulier, leaves in 1892 in order to become the chairman of International Skating Union, it is Fortuyn who succeeds him. However, Fortuyn himself also resigns in the following year and is replaced by W. Prange. Despite his short stint at KNVB, Fortuyn would eventually even become an honorary member of that organization.

In 1925, he kicked off the first game in the Zuiderpark Stadium, and a few years later, in 1937, he did the same at De Kuip, which is now the stadium of Feyenoord, a club whose ambitions of having a huge stadium in Rotterdam he supported from the start, unlike his political colleagues. In addition to football, he was also an advanced adept of the game of chess.

== Death ==
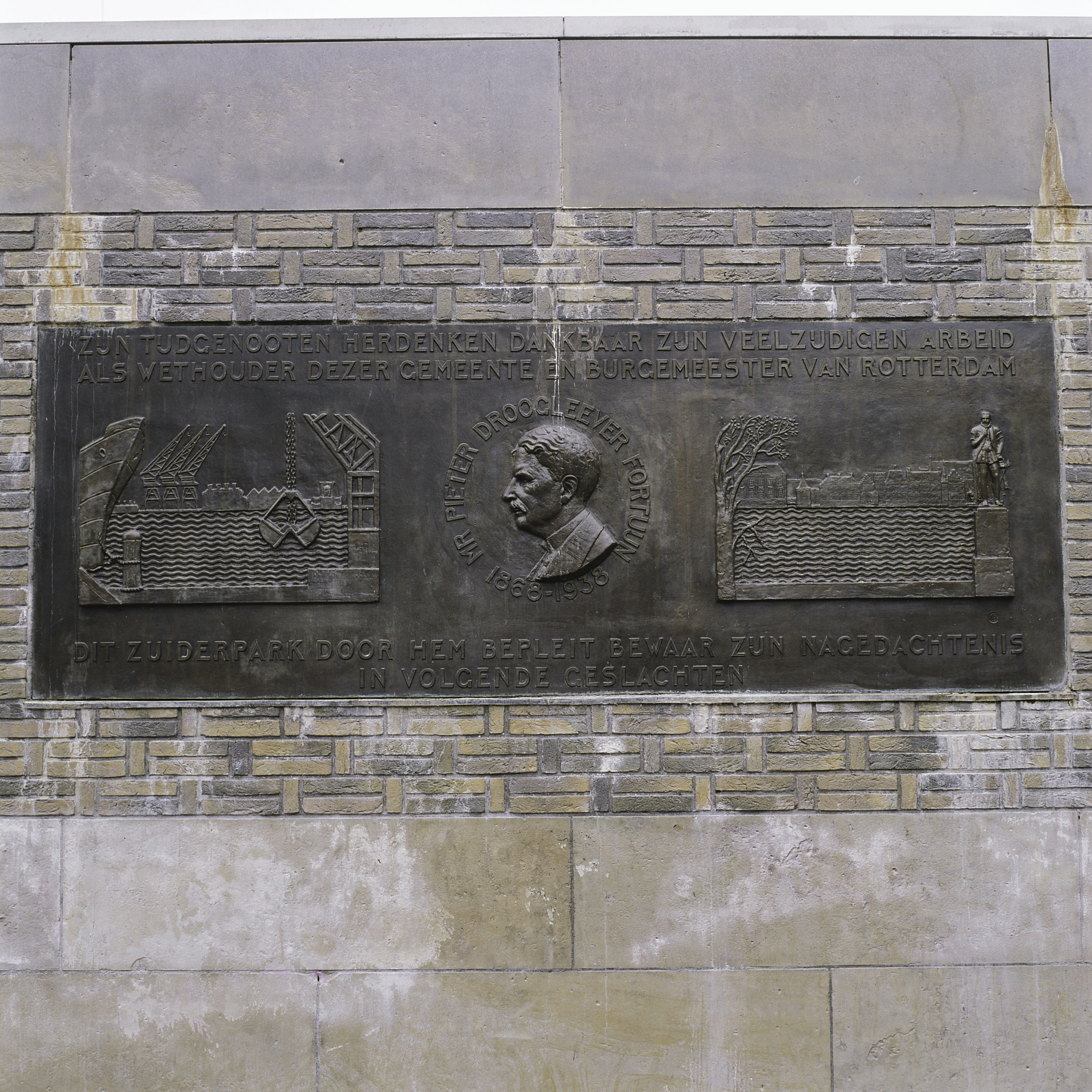
Memorial plaque for Mr. Droogleever Fortuyn in the wall next to the entrance of the Zuiderpark.

After returning home from an exciting trip abroad, he was admitted to a hospital in The Hague, where he died on 6 September 1938. He thus died before he could complete his second term in office.

The deputy mayor, alderman A. B. de Zeeuw gave speeches in his honor during the extraordinary sessions of the City Council of 7 September and at the occasion of the funeral ceremony in the Town Hall on 10 September 1938.

== Legacy ==
The Droogleever Fortuynplein, on the north side of the Maastunnel, is named after him, just like the Mr. P. Droogleever Fortuynweg in the Zuiderpark in The Hague. Given his role for the Zuiderpark, a year after his death a group of people came together to realize a memorial for him at the park, which was made by the sculptor Corinne Franzen-Heslenfeld. To illustrate the significance of Droogleever Fortuijn, a relief depicting the port of Rotterdam can be seen to the left of his portrait medallion.

== Overview ==
Political positions of Pieter Droogleever Fortuyn:

- Lawyer and attorney in The Hague, from 1894 to 1913
- Director of the Municipal Mortgage Bank in The Hague, from 1898 to 1925
- Member of the municipal council of The Hague, from 3 September 1912 to 15 October 1928
- Alderman (of finance and crisis and distribution affairs) of The Hague, from 2 September 1913 to 2 September 1919
- Alderman (of public works and housing) of The Hague, from 2 September 1919 to 16 July 1923
- Member of the House of Representatives of the States General, from 15 September 1925 to 17 September 1929
- Mayor of Rotterdam, from 15 October 1928 to 6 September 1938
- Member of the Senate of the States General, from 20 September 1932 to 6 September 1938.
