= Pieter Oud =

Dutch politician (1886–1968)

His Excellency Pieter Oud
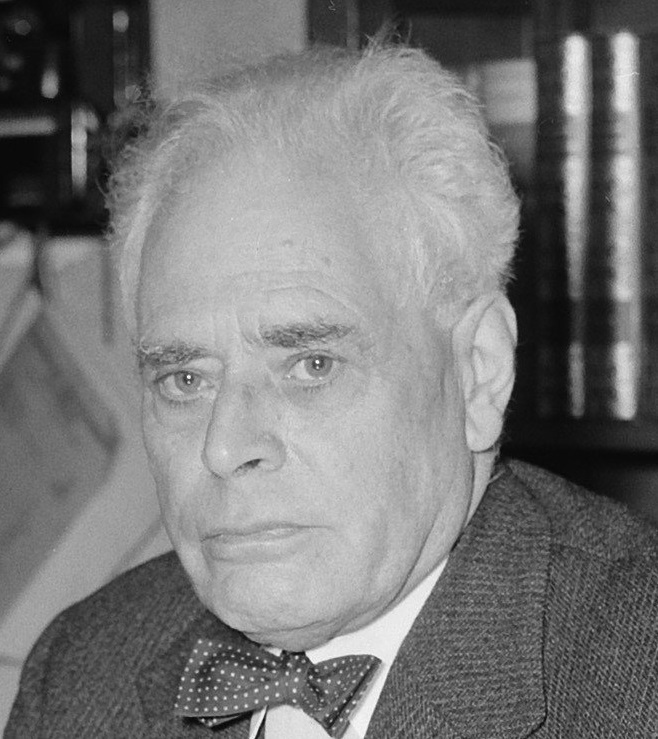
- Oud in 1956

Chairman of the People's Party for Freedom and Democracy
- In office 8 April 1949 – 9 November 1963
- Leader: Himself (1949–1963); Edzo Toxopeus (1963)
- Preceded by: Dirk Stikker
- Succeeded by: Kornelis van der Pols

Leader of the People's Party for Freedom and Democracy
- In office 28 January 1948 – 16 May 1963
- Preceded by: Office established
- Succeeded by: Edzo Toxopeus

Mayor of Rotterdam
- In office 7 May 1945 – 1 June 1952
- Preceded by: Frederik Ernst Müller
- Succeeded by: Gerard van Walsum
- In office 15 October 1938 – 10 October 1941
- Preceded by: Pieter Droogleever Fortuyn
- Succeeded by: Arie de Zeeuw (ad interim)

Parliamentary leader in the House of Representatives
- In office 27 July 1948 – 16 May 1963
- Preceded by: Office established
- Succeeded by: Roelof Zegering Hadders
- Parliamentary group: People's Party for Freedom and Democracy
- In office 20 September 1937 – 15 October 1938
- Preceded by: Dolf Joekes
- Succeeded by: Dolf Joekes
- Parliamentary group: Free-thinking Democratic League

Leader of the Free-thinking Democratic League
- In office 18 May 1935 – 15 October 1938
- Deputy: Dolf Joekes
- Preceded by: Henri Marchant
- Succeeded by: Dolf Joekes

Minister of Finance
- In office 26 May 1933 – 24 June 1937
- Prime Minister: Hendrikus Colijn
- Preceded by: Dirk Jan de Geer
- Succeeded by: Jacob Adriaan de Wilde

Member of the House of Representatives
- In office 27 July 1948 – 5 June 1963
- In office 8 June 1937 – 8 November 1938
- In office 28 June 1917 – 26 May 1933
- Constituency: Den Helder (1917–1918)

Personal details
- Born: Pieter Jacobus Oud; 5 December 1886 Purmerend, Netherlands
- Died: 12 August 1968 (aged 81) Rotterdam, Netherlands
- Party: People's Party for Freedom and Democracy (from 1948)
- Other political affiliations: Committee-Oud (1947–1948); Labour Party (1946–1947); Free-thinking Democratic League (1908–1946)
- Spouse: Johanna Cornelia Fischer (m. 1912)
- Children: Hendrik Cornelis Oud (1912–1998)
- Relatives: Jacobus Oud (brother)
- Education: Amsterdam University of Applied Sciences (Bachelor of Civil Law); University of Amsterdam (Master of Laws)
- Occupation: Politician, civil servant, Jurist, Historian, Businessman, Tax advisor, Tax collector, Corporate director, Nonprofit director, Editor, Author, professor

Military service
- Allegiance: Netherlands
- Branch/service: Royal Netherlands Army
- Years of service: 1914–1916 (Conscription); 1916–1917 (Reserve)
- Rank: Sergeant
- Unit: Regiment Infanterie Oranje Gelderland
- Battles/wars: World War I

Pieter Jacobus Oud (5 December 1886 – 12 August 1968) was a Dutch politician of the Free-thinking Democratic League (VDB) and later co-founder of the Labour Party (PvdA) and the People's Party for Freedom and Democracy (VVD) and historian. He was granted the honorary title of Minister of State on 9 November 1963.

== Life ==
=== Life before politics ===
Oud came from a middle class family. His father traded in tobacco, wine, and later stocks, and served as alderman in Purmerend. Oud attended HBS in Amsterdam, graduating in 1904. He continued to study to become notary between 1904 and 1907. During this time he had become member of the board of the League of Freethinking Propaganda Associations, the freethinking liberal youth organisation. He took a private courses in registration in Gorinchem between 1907 and 1909. Between 1909 and 1911 he was civil servant within the ministry of Finance responsible for registration and government possessions. In 1911 he became a tax collector on Texel. In 1912 he took his matriculation to study law at the University of Amsterdam. He combined his work as tax collector with his study of law. In the same year he married Johanna Cornelia Fischer, from this marriage they got one son. In 1914 he became tax collector in Ommen. Meanwhile, he was mobilised as Sergeant of the seventh regiment infantry, which was stationed near Amsterdam between 1914 and 1916. Between 1915 and 1919 he was member of the national board of the VDB. He graduated in 1917 on basis of a disputation.

=== Political life ===
==== For the VDB ====
Oud was elected in 1917 election for the VDB, the last election with runoff voting. He defeated Staalman of the left-wing Christian Democratic Party in the second round in the district of Den Helder. He retained his legal position as tax collector, but was given a leave for undetermined time. He was even promoted to inspector of finances in 1921, while on leave. In the 1918 election Oud stood for elections again, and was elected with 5,000 preference votes, mainly from the former district of Den Helder. While MP, Oud also served as secretary of the VDB national board and editor of the De Vrijzinnige Democraat, the party's magazine. In parliament Oud took a particular interest in military matters and education, and served as the party's finance spokesperson. As MP he served as member of the Committee on the Navy between 1923 and 1933 and the Committee on the Army since 1925. He was chairman of the association for the promotion of public education "People's Education" for many years.

After the 1933 election, Oud was appointed Minister of Finance in the second cabinet led by Hendrik Colijn. As minister, he was responsible for a large scale operation of budget cuts, during a time of economic crisis. In 1935 he proposed the Bezuigingswet 1935 ("Budget Cut Act 1935"), which involved many budget cuts and financial reorganisations: salaries of civil servants were cut, the old age pensions were financed in a different way and for budgetary reasons, soldiers were to become civil servants after a certain period. Although his proposals lead to a political crisis, they were nonetheless carried by parliament. In the same year, after Henri Marchant left the VDB following a scandal, Oud succeeded him as political leader of the VDB. Oud led the VDB in the 1937 election and returned to the House of Representatives as chair of the parliamentary party. He also served as chair for the committee on government expenditure.

==== In Rotterdam ====
He left the House of Representatives in 1938 to become Mayor of Rotterdam. As mayor he also served in the College of Curators of the University of Rotterdam and as chair of the Association of Netherlands Municipalities. After he stepped down in 1952 he became honorary chairman of that association. In 1939 he was elected to the Provincial Council of South Holland. In August 1939 he was offered the position of Minister of Finance in the cabinet of Dirk Jan de Geer, but declined.

Controversially, Oud did not resign after the German invasion of 1940, although he was not a member of the National Socialist Movement in the Netherlands (NSB). During his period as mayor, he was involved in the reconstruction of the centre of Rotterdam which was destroyed by the German bombings. He was heavily criticised by Dutch politicians for cooperating too much with the NSB, while the NSB criticised him for being uncooperative. In the spring of 1941 he was brutally harassed by members of the NSB, twelve party-members invaded the City Hall, gagged Oud, adorned him with Freemason-like symbols and made pictures of him. In the autumn of 1941 he resigned as mayor and he stood down as member of the States Provincial. He was succeeded by Frederik Ernst Müller. In the summer of 1942 he was briefly held in Kamp Sint-Michielsgestel, where many prominent Dutch politicians were held captive. During the war Oud kept far from the resistance movement and instead committed himself to writing several books on parliamentary history. Meanwhile, he kept close contact with important people from the business and the political world of Rotterdam.

In 1945, after the liberation of the Netherlands, he returned to Rotterdam as mayor, although he was also asked to become Mayor of Amsterdam, and he was officially re-appointed in 1946. In the same year the VDB merged with the social democratic SDAP and the left-wing Christian CDU to form the Labour Party. Oud was one of the co-founders of this party and served on the party's board between 1946 and 1947. Meanwhile, he served on many government, business, international and civil society committees, he chaired the government committee for municipal finances between 1946 and 1954, he was member of the board of trustees of the banker Staal, he was member of the pension council of the Dutch Reformed Church since 1946 and he served as chair of the International Union of Municipalities and Local Governments between 1948 and 1954.

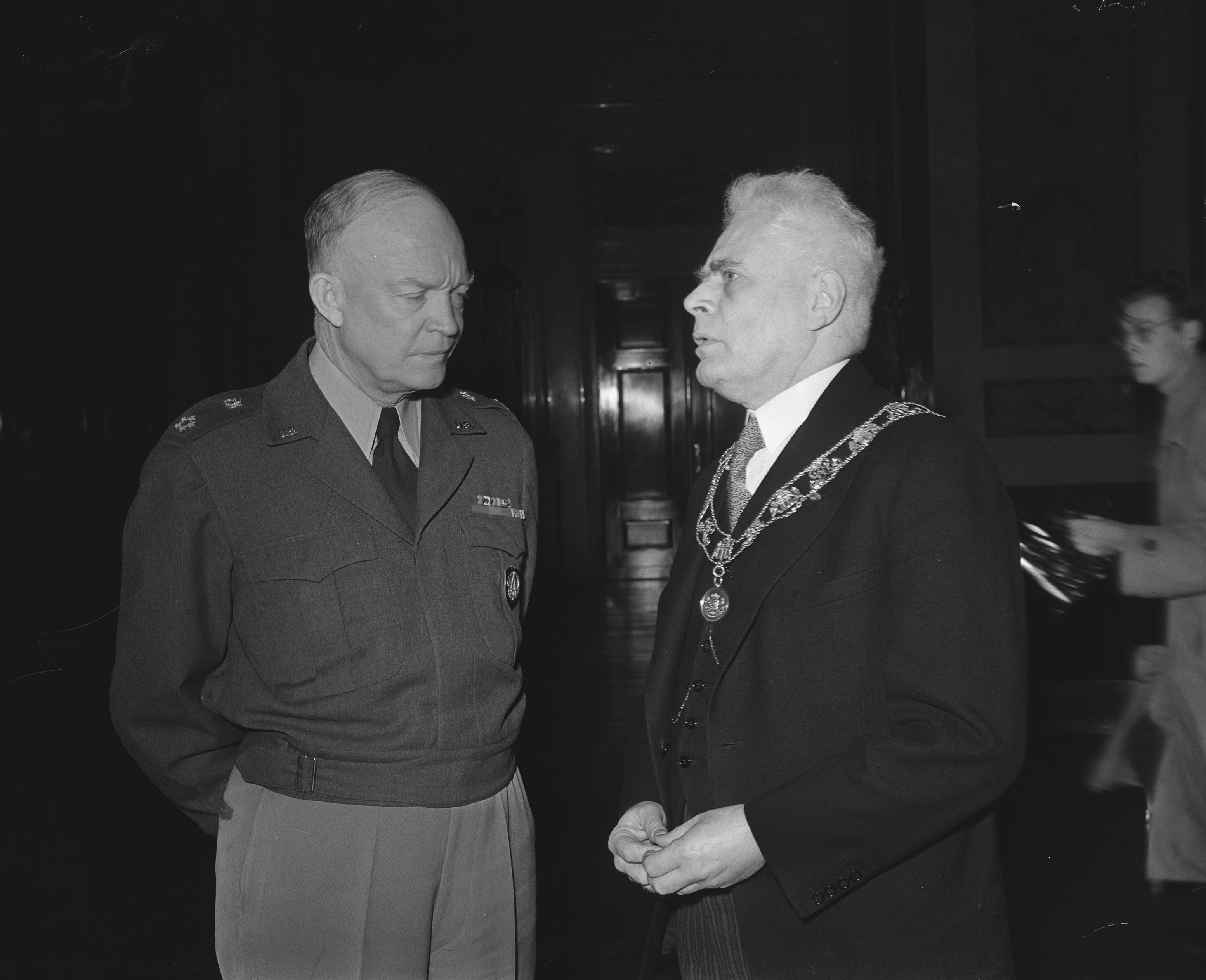
Supreme Allied Commander Europe General of the Army Dwight D. Eisenhower and Mayor of Rotterdam Pieter Oud during a meeting at the Rotterdam City Hall on 21 November 1951

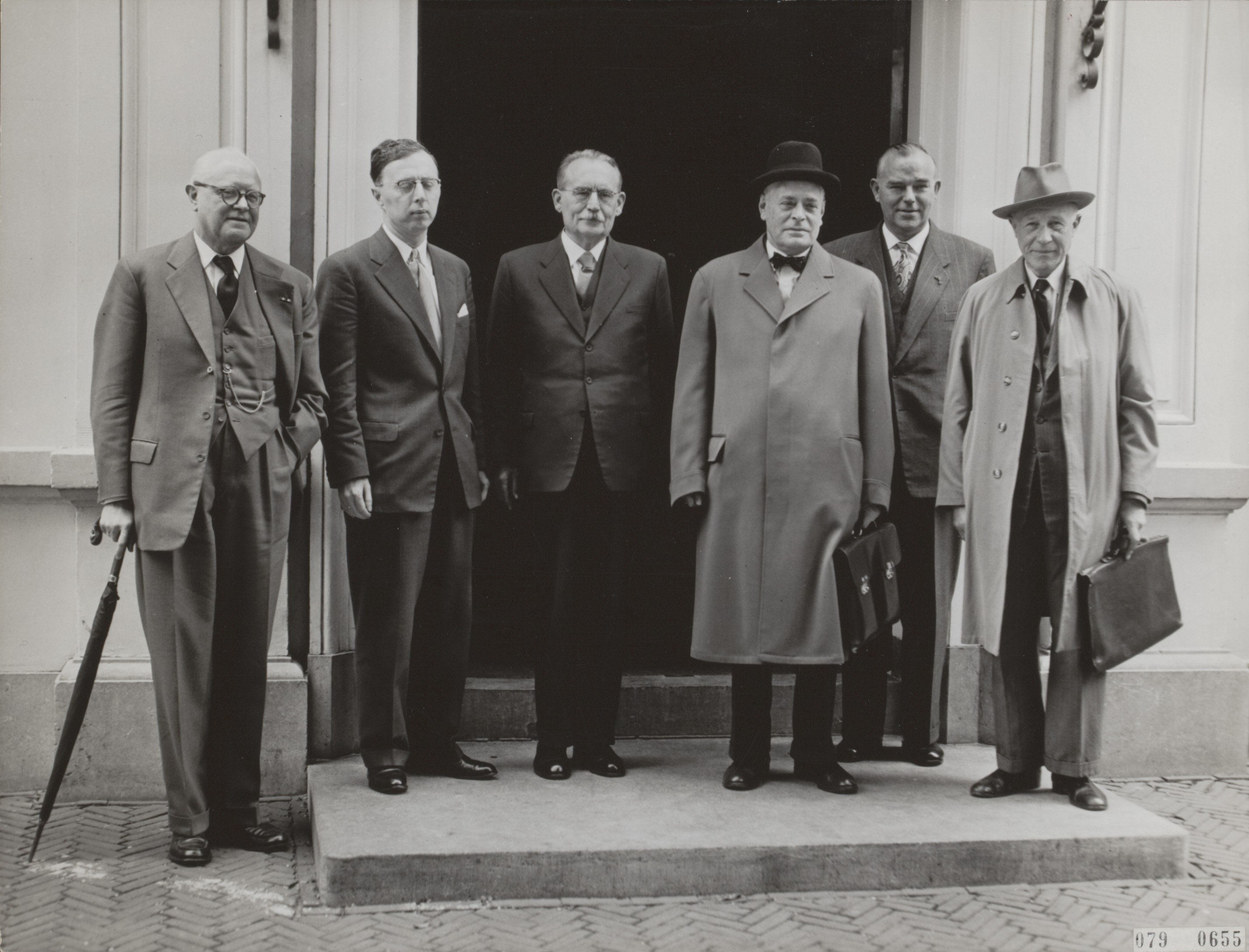
Leader of the Catholic People's Party Carl Romme, Leader of the Anti-Revolutionary Party Jelle Zijlstra, Prime Minister and Leader of the Labour Party Willem Drees, Leader of the People's Party for Freedom and Democracy Pieter Oud, Deputy Leader of the Labour Party Jaap Burger and Leader of the Christian Historical Union Hendrik Tilanus during a meeting at the Ministry of General Affairs on 20 June 1956

==== For the VVD ====
On 3 October 1947, Oud sent a letter to the board of the PvdA announcing his resignation as a member. The reason he gave for the split was that the PvdA was moving too much into socialist waters, instead of being committed to progressive politics. The fact that he was refused a position on the party list for the Senate is generally seen as the political reason for Oud's split. Oud never felt at home in the new social democratic party.

He immediately founded the Committee of Preparation of the Foundation of a Democratic People's Party, which prepared the foundation of the VVD. He negotiated the merger of the remnants of the old VDB with the newly founded Freedom Party. On 24 January 1948 he became one of the founding members of the liberal People's Party for Freedom and Democracy, together with Dirk Stikker and Henk Korthals, and served in its first national board as vice-chair. In 1948 he was elected to the House of Representatives for the VVD, and became chair of its parliamentary party, combining this position with the position of chair of the party's organisation.

In parliament he mainly spoke on issues of administrative and constitutional law. He was a very influential member of parliament. When the law concerning the decolonisation of Indonesia, a very controversial issue, was voted on, the two-thirds majority was only reached because an amendment proposed by Oud ensured the support of the VVD. In 1950–51 Oud came into conflict with the VVD's Minister of Foreign Affairs, Stikker, over the policy concerning Netherlands New Guinea. Between 1950 and 1953 he was a member of the Government Committee Van Schaik, which prepared a constitutional change. In 1952 he did not seek to be reappointed as Rotterdam's mayor, and instead became extraordinary professor of Constitutional Administrative law at the University of Rotterdam, which he remained until 1957. Between 1953 and 1963 he was chair of the Justice Committee of the House of Representatives. As such, he was heavily involved in the preparation of many laws, and served as chair on the committees preparing the laws on the provinces, the police, archives, patents and many more. In 1959 he came into conflict with Harm van Riel, the chair of the VVD's parliamentary party in the Senate, because Van Riel wanted to become minister, but Oud denied him this.

In the last years of his period in the House of Representatives, Oud was the eldest member of the House and on many times functioned as Speaker, such as when a new Speaker was elected. Before the 1963 election Oud announced that he would not continue as MP; he was succeeded by the Minister of the Interior Edzo Toxopeus. In the same year, he was appointed as Minister of State, an honorary title.

=== Life after politics ===
After 1963, Oud retired from Dutch political life. He was only asked upon at times of great crisis. In 1966 he was member of the committee that advised the government on the ministerial responsibility towards members of the royal house, together with Willem Drees. In the same year, he co-authored a book on a new constitution.

When Oud died in 1968, his family wanted to announce his death after the burial. His general practitioner did not know this, and told a patient that evening that Oud had died that afternoon. The father of this patient happened to be a journalist for the socialist paper Het Vrije Volk, which published a large In Memoriam the next morning.

== Personal life ==
Jacobus Oud, a famous Dutch architect, was his brother.

Oud was a lifelong member of the freethinking Protestant broadcasting organisation, VPRO.

== Decorations ==
Honours
Ribbon bar	Honour	Country	Date	Comment
	Grand Cross of the Order of the Crown	Belgium	4 April 1936	
	Commander of the Order of the Netherlands Lion	Netherlands	30 July 1937	Elevated from Knight (29 August 1925)
	Grand Cross of the Order of the House of Orange	Netherlands	10 December 1945	
	Grand Cross of the Order of the Oak Crown	Luxembourg	1 August 1950	
	Grand Cross of the Legion of Honour	France	8 March 1957	
	Knight Grand Cross of the Order of Orange-Nassau	Netherlands	21 June 1957	

Honorific titles
Ribbon bar	Honour	Country	Date	Comment
	Minister of State	Netherlands	9 November 1963	Style of Excellency

== Bibliography ==
- "Om de Democratie" (1929; "For Democracy")
- "Het jongste verleden: Parlementaire geschiedenis van Nederland, 1918–1940" (1946; The recent past: parliamentary history of the Netherlands, 1918-194-)
- "Honderd jaren: Hoofdzaken der Nederlandsche staatkundige geschiedenis, 1840–1940" (1946; One hundred years, Important matters of the Dutch political history 1840–1940)
- "Het constitutionele recht van het Koninkrijk der Nederlanden" (1947–1953; The constitutional law of the Kingdom of the Netherlands)
- "Proeve van een Grondwet (1966; Attempt at a constitution)

House of Representatives of the Netherlands
Preceded by Theo de Meester	Member for Den Helder; 1917–1918	Electoral district abolished
Party political offices
Preceded by Henri Marchant	Leader of the Free-thinking; Democratic League; 1935–1938	Succeeded by Dolf Joekes
Preceded by Dolf Joekes	Parliamentary leader of the Free-thinking Democratic League in the House of Representatives; 1937–1938	Succeeded by Dolf Joekes
New political party	Leader of the People's Party for Freedom and Democracy; 1948–1963	Succeeded by Edzo Toxopeus
New political party	Lead candidate of the People's Party for Freedom and Democracy; 1948, 1952, 1956, 1959	Succeeded by Edzo Toxopeus
New political party	Parliamentary leader of the People's Party for Freedom and Democracy in the House of Representatives; 1948–1963	Succeeded by Roelof Zegering Hadders
New political party	Vice Chairman of the People's Party for Freedom and Democracy; 1948–1949	Succeeded by Harm van Riel
Preceded by Dirk Stikker	Chairman of the People's Party for Freedom and Democracy; 1949–1963	Succeeded by Kornelis van der Pols
Political offices
Preceded by Dirk Jan de Geer	Minister of Finance; 1933–1937	Succeeded by Jacob Adriaan de Wilde
Preceded by Pieter Droogleever Fortuyn	Mayor of Rotterdam; 1938–1941; 1945–1952	Succeeded by Arie de Zeeuw; Ad interim
Preceded by Frederik Ernst Müller	Mayor of Rotterdam; 1938–1941; 1945–1952	Succeeded by Gerard van Walsum
Non-profit organization positions
Preceded by Pieter Droogleever Fortuyn	Chairman of the Association of Netherlands Municipalities; 1946–1952	Succeeded by Arnold Jan d'Ailly
