= Langebakkersoord =

Coordinates: 51°53′N 4°20′E

Langebakkersoord is a former municipality in the Dutch province of South Holland. It was located northwest of Hoogvliet, on the confluence of the Oude Maas and Nieuwe Maas rivers.

Langebakkersoord was a separate municipality between 1817 and 1826, when it merged with Pernis.
