= Edzo Toxopeus =

Dutch politician and diplomat

His Excellency Edzo Toxopeus
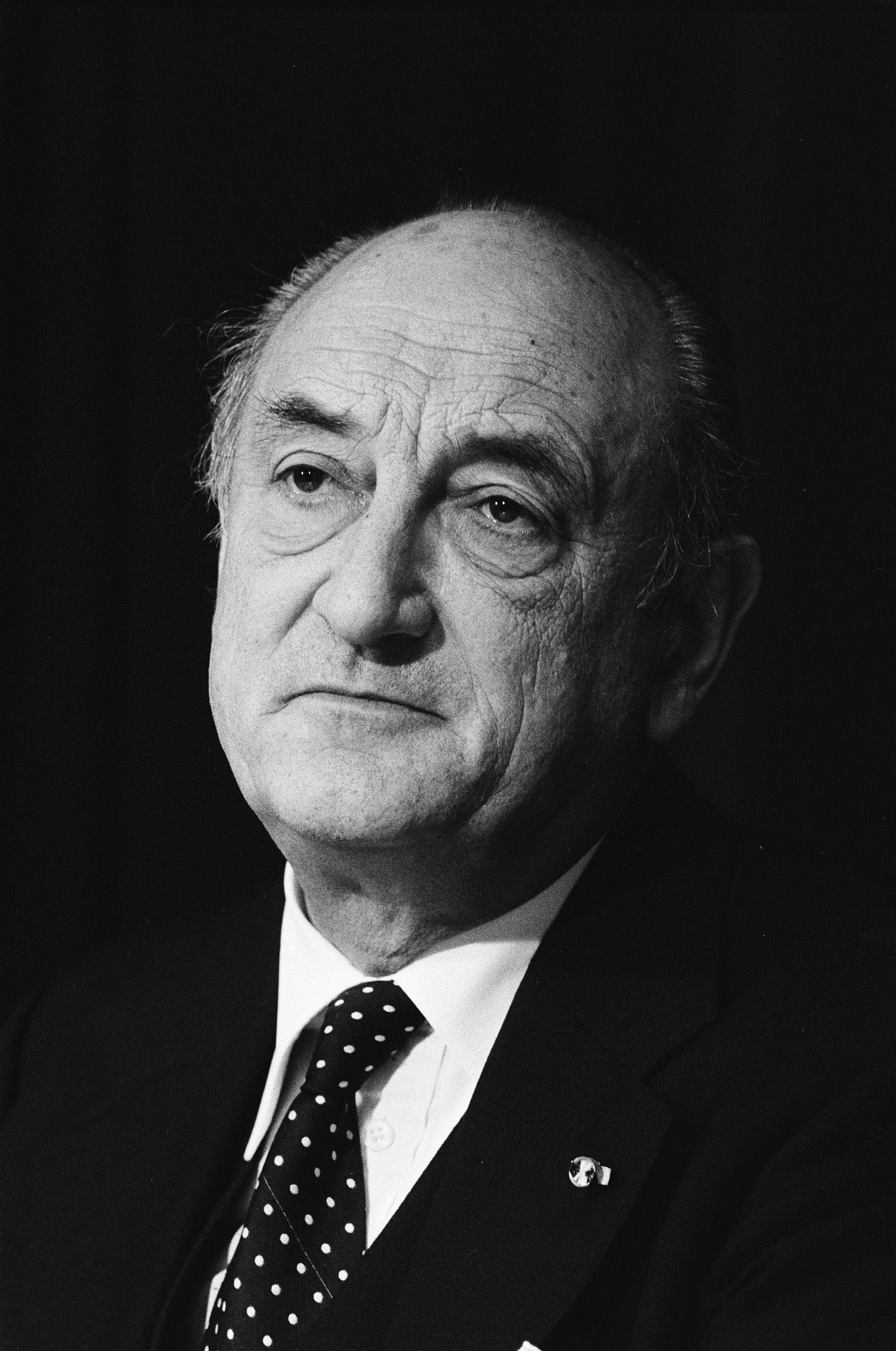
- Toxopeus in 1979

Member of the Council of State
- In office 1 November 1980 – 1 March 1988
- Vice President: Willem Scholten

Queen's Commissioner of Groningen
- In office 16 February 1970 – 1 November 1980
- Monarchs: Juliana (1970–1980); Beatrix (1980)
- Preceded by: Cees Fock
- Succeeded by: Henk Vonhoff

President of the Liberal International
- In office 15 April 1966 – 25 April 1970
- Preceded by: Giovanni Malagodi
- Succeeded by: Gaston Thorn

Parliamentary leader in the House of Representatives
- In office 12 March 1966 – 1 October 1969
- Preceded by: Molly Geertsema
- Succeeded by: Molly Geertsema
- In office 2 July 1963 – 24 July 1963
- Preceded by: Roelof Zegering Hadders
- Succeeded by: Molly Geertsema
- Parliamentary group: People's Party for Freedom and Democracy

Leader of the People's Party for Freedom and Democracy
- In office 30 March 1963 – 1 October 1969
- Preceded by: Pieter Oud
- Succeeded by: Molly Geertsema

Minister of the Interior
- In office 19 May 1959 – 14 April 1965
- Prime Minister: Jan de Quay (1959–1963); Victor Marijnen (1963–1965)
- Preceded by: Teun Struycken; Interior, Property and Public Sector Organisations
- Succeeded by: Jan Smallenbroek

Member of the House of Representatives
- In office 21 September 1965 – 1 November 1969
- In office 2 July 1963 – 24 July 1963
- In office 6 November 1956 – 19 May 1959

Personal details
- Born: Edzo Hendrik Toxopeus; 19 February 1918 Amersfoort, Netherlands
- Died: 23 August 2009 (aged 91) Oegstgeest, Netherlands
- Party: People's Party for Freedom and Democracy (from 1948)
- Other political affiliations: Freedom Party (1946–1948)
- Spouse: Alberta Ufkes (m. 1944; died 2005)
- Children: 1 son and 1 daughter
- Education: Utrecht University
- Occupation: Politician · Lawyer

Military service
- Allegiance: Netherlands
- Branch/service: Royal Netherlands Army
- Years of service: 1944–1945 (active duty); 1945–1948 (reserve)
- Rank: Lieutenant
- Battles/wars: World War II; Operation Market Garden; Battle of Groningen

Edzo Hendrik Toxopeus (Dutch: [ˈɛtsoː ˈɦɛndrɪk tɔksoːˈpeːjʏs]; 19 February 1918 – 23 August 2009) was a Dutch politician who served as Minister of the Interior between 1959 and 1965, and as Leader of the People's Party for Freedom and Democracy between 1963 and 1969.

== Early life and education ==
After earning his diploma in Breda, Toxopeus studied Law at the Utrecht University, obtaining a master's degree in 1942. From 1942 to 1959, he was an established lawyer in Breda. He worked as a paralegal in Breda from July 1942 until October 1944, and as a military lawyer and head of the legal department of the military commission in the Royal Netherlands Army from November 1944 until August 1945. Toxopeus worked as a criminal defense lawyer in Breda from August 1945 until May 1959.

== Political career ==
From 1949 to 1959, Toxopeus served on the municipal council of Breda. He became a member of the House of Representatives on 6 November 1956, shortly after the 1956 general election, when the number of seats was increased from 100 to 150. He served as spokesperson for law enforcement and spatial planning.

After the 1959 general election Toxopeus was appointed as Minister of the Interior in the De Quay cabinet, taking office on 19 May 1959. Shortly before the 1963 general election, party leader and parliamentary leader Pieter Oud announced his retirement, and Toxopeus was selected as his successor on 30 March 1963. Toxopeus served as lead candidate in the election, and following a cabinet formation, the coalition continued and Toxopeus retained his ministerial post in the Marijnen cabinet. As Minister of the Interior, Toxopeus introduced several major reforms to the civil service, including major increase to salaries, improvements to employment conditions and the free Saturday was implemented in 1961.

However, this cabinet fell just 19 months into its term and was replaced by the Cals cabinet on 14 April 1965. Toxopeus returned to the House of Representatives on 21 September 1965 but against custom did not take over as parliamentary leader immediately, serving instead as chair of the Committee for the Interior, deputy parliamentary leader and spokesperson for general affairs before taking over as parliamentary leader on 12 March 1966. Toxopeus also served as President of the Liberal International from 15 April 1966 until 25 April 1970. For the 1967 general election Toxopeus reprised as lead candidate, and following a successful cabinet formation with the Catholics formed the De Jong cabinet, with Toxopeus opting to remain parliamentary leader. On 1 October 1969 Toxopeus unexpectedly announced he was stepping down as leader, but he continued to serve in the House of Representatives until his resignation on 1 November 1969.

Toxopeus continued to be active in politics and in January 1970 was nominated as the next Queen's Commissioner of Groningen serving from 16 February 1970 until 1 November 1980. Following the formation of the Van Agt–Wiegel cabinet in 1977, Toxopeus was asked to become Minister of Finance, but he refused. Toxopeus also became active in the private and public sectors as a corporate and non-profit director and served on several state commissions and councils on behalf of the government. In October 1980 Toxopeus was nominated as a member of the Council of State, serving from 1 November 1980 until 1 March 1988.

== Later life and death ==
Toxopeus retired from active politics at 70, but continued to be active as an advocate and lobbyist for European integration, and he served as an occasional diplomat for economic and diplomatic delegations for the European Union. Toxopeus died on 23 August 2009, at age 91.

Toxopeus was known for his abilities as a skilful manager and effective negotiator. Toxopeus granted the honorary title of Minister of State on 22 January 1985 and continued to comment on political affairs as a statesman until his death. He holds the distinction as the longest-serving Minister of the Interior after World War II with 5 years, 330 days.

== Decorations ==
Honours
Ribbon bar	Honour	Country	Date	Comment
	Grand Cross of the Order of the Crown	Belgium	15 March 1960	
	Grand Officer of the Legion of Honour	France	12 February 1961	
	Grand Officer of the Order of the Oak Crown	Luxembourg	1 May 1963	
	Grand Cross of the Order of Merit	Portugal	4 April 1964	
	Grand Cross of the Order of Merit	Germany	30 January 1965	
	Grand Officer of the Order of Orange-Nassau	Netherlands	10 December 1980	Elevated from Commander (20 April 1965)
	Commander of the Order of the Netherlands Lion	Netherlands	22 January 1985	Elevated from Knight (1 November 1969)

Awards
Ribbon bar	Awards	Organisation	Date	Comment
	Honorary Member	People's Party for Freedom and Democracy	28 February 1970	

Honorific titles
Ribbon bar	Honour	Country	Date	Comment
	Minister of State	Netherlands	22 January 1985	Style of Excellency

Party political offices
Preceded by Pieter Oud	Leader of the People's Party for Freedom and Democracy; 1963–1969	Succeeded by Molly Geertsema
Preceded by Pieter Oud; 1959	Lead candidate of the People's Party for Freedom and Democracy; 1963, 1967	Succeeded by Molly Geertsema; 1971
Preceded by Roelof Zegering Hadders	Parliamentary leader of the People's Party for Freedom and Democracy in the House of Representatives; 1963; 1966–1969	Succeeded by Molly Geertsema
Preceded by Molly Geertsema	Parliamentary leader of the People's Party for Freedom and Democracy in the House of Representatives; 1963; 1966–1969	Succeeded by Molly Geertsema
Preceded by Giovanni Malagodi	President of the Liberal International; 1966–1970	Succeeded by Gaston Thorn
Political offices
Preceded by Teun Struycken as Minister of the Interior, Property and Public Sector Organisations	Minister of the Interior; 1959–1965	Succeeded by Jan Smallenbroek
Preceded by Cees Fock	Queen's Commissioner of Groningen; 1970–1980	Succeeded by Henk Vonhoff
