= De Mijl =

Hamlet in South Holland, Netherlands

Coordinates: 51°48′15″N 4°38′45″E

De Mijl is a former hamlet in the Dutch province of South Holland. It was located about 2 km southwest of the city of Dordrecht, on the Oude Maas river.

De Mijl was a separate municipality from 1817 to 1857, when it became part of Dubbeldam.
