= Dubbeldam =

Coordinates: 51°47′N 4°44′E

- Former village and municipality
- Coat of arms

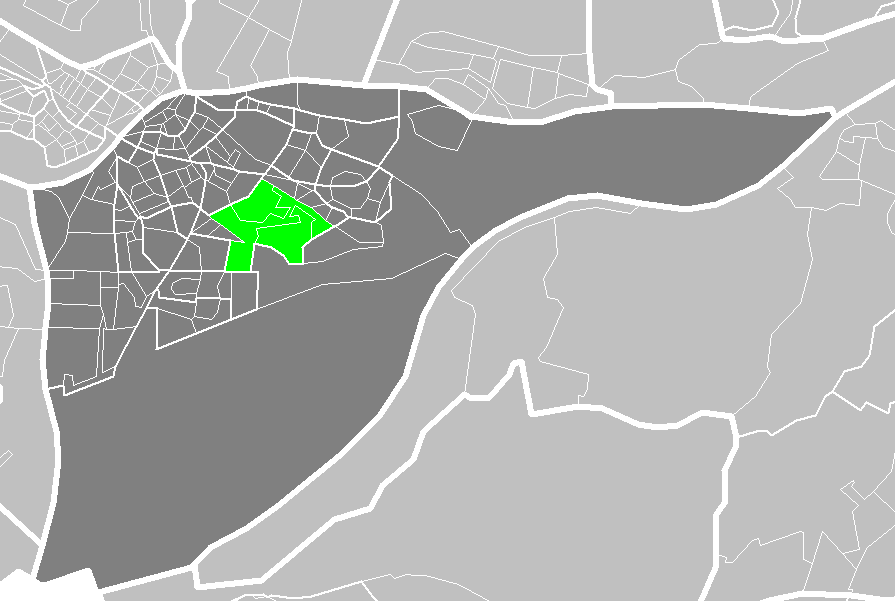
- Country: Netherlands
- Province: South Holland
- Municipality: Dordrecht

Dubbeldam is a former village in the Dutch province of South Holland. It was located to the east of the city of Dordrecht. It is now a part of that city.

De Mijl was a separate municipality until 1857, when it became part of Dubbeldam.

Dubbeldam was a separate municipality until 1970, when it merged with Dordrecht.
