= Lambertus Neher =

Dutch politician and businessman

Neher (left) (1954)

Lambertus Neher (13 September 1889, Amsterdam – 22 August 1967, Voorst) was a Dutch politician and businessman.

For his active role in the Dutch resistance in World War II, he received an American honour, the Medal of Freedom with Gold Palm, on April 9, 1953.
