= Leonard Geluk =

Dutch politician

Leonard Geluk (born 25 April 1970, Dordrecht) is a Dutch politician. He is a member of the Christian Democratic Appeal (CDA).

From 2004 to 2009, Geluk was an alderman of Rotterdam.

Geluk studied law at Erasmus University Rotterdam. He belongs to the Protestant Church in the Netherlands (PKN).
