= List of mayors of Rotterdam =

This is a list of mayors of Rotterdam.

Term	Mayor	Party
1813–1824	Johan François graaf van Hogendorp van Heeswijk	
1824–1845	Marinus Cornelis Bichon van IJsselmonde	
1845–1866	Johan Frederik Hoffman	
1866–1881	Joost van Vollenhoven	
1881–1891	Sjoerd Anne Vening Meinesz	
1891–1893	Pieter Lycklama à Nijeholt	
1893–1906	Frederik Bernard s'Jacob	
1906–1923	Alfred Rudolf Zimmerman	
1923–1928	Johannes Wytema	
1928–1938	Pieter Droogleever Fortuyn	LSP
1938–1941	Pieter Oud	VDB
1941–1945	Frederik Ernst Müller	NSB
1945–1952	Pieter Oud	PvdA, later VVD
1952–1965	Gerard van Walsum	PvdA
1965–1974	Wim Thomassen	PvdA
1974–1981	André van der Louw	PvdA
1982–1998	Bram Peper	PvdA
1999–2009	Ivo Opstelten	VVD
2009–2024	Ahmed Aboutaleb	PvdA
2024–present	Carola Schouten	CU
