= Gerard van Walsum =

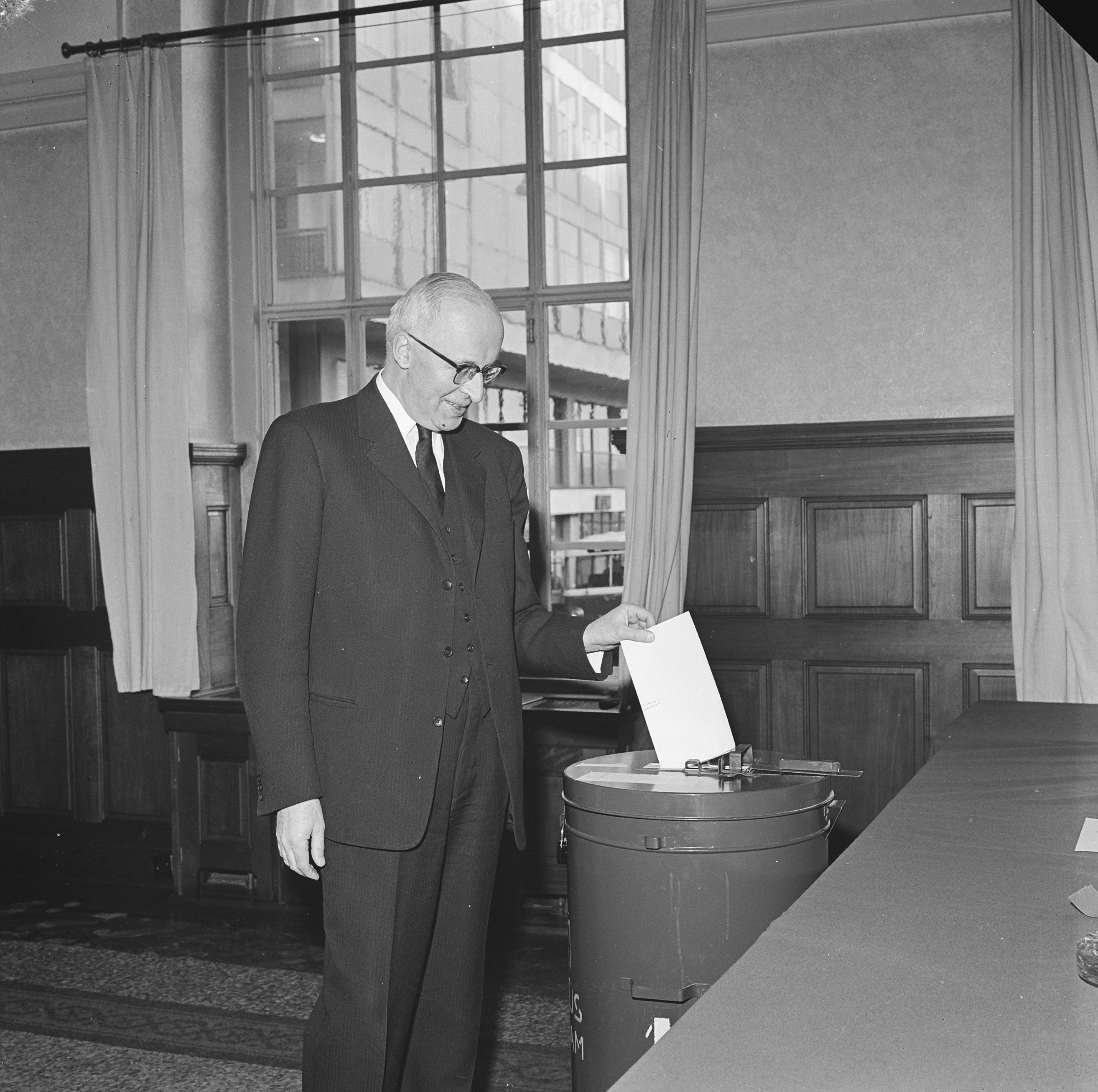

Gerard Ewout van Walsum (21 February 1900 – 27 July 1980) was a Dutch politician of the PvdA.

He was both a member of the House of Representatives and the Senate, councilor and alderman of Rotterdam, and mayor of Delft and Rotterdam.

He is most known for last one, which lasted from 1952 to 1965.

Van Walsum was born in Krimpen aan den IJssel and died in Rotterdam.

Political offices
Preceded by Gerardus van Baren	Mayor of Delft; 1948–1952	Succeeded by Dirk de Loor
Preceded by Pieter Oud	Mayor of Rotterdam; 1952–1965	Succeeded by Wim Thomassen
