= 's-Gravenambacht =

Former municipality in South Holland, Netherlands

Coordinates: 51°53′18″N 4°24′55″E

's-Gravenambacht is a former hamlet and former municipality in the Dutch province of South Holland. The area is now part of Rotterdam, and almost completely covered by the Eemhaven dockyards. The western part of the village of Heijplaat is also in this area.

The municipality existed between 1817 and 1832, when it merged with Pernis.
