= Pernis, Netherlands =

Coordinates: 51°53′N 4°23′E

Pernis
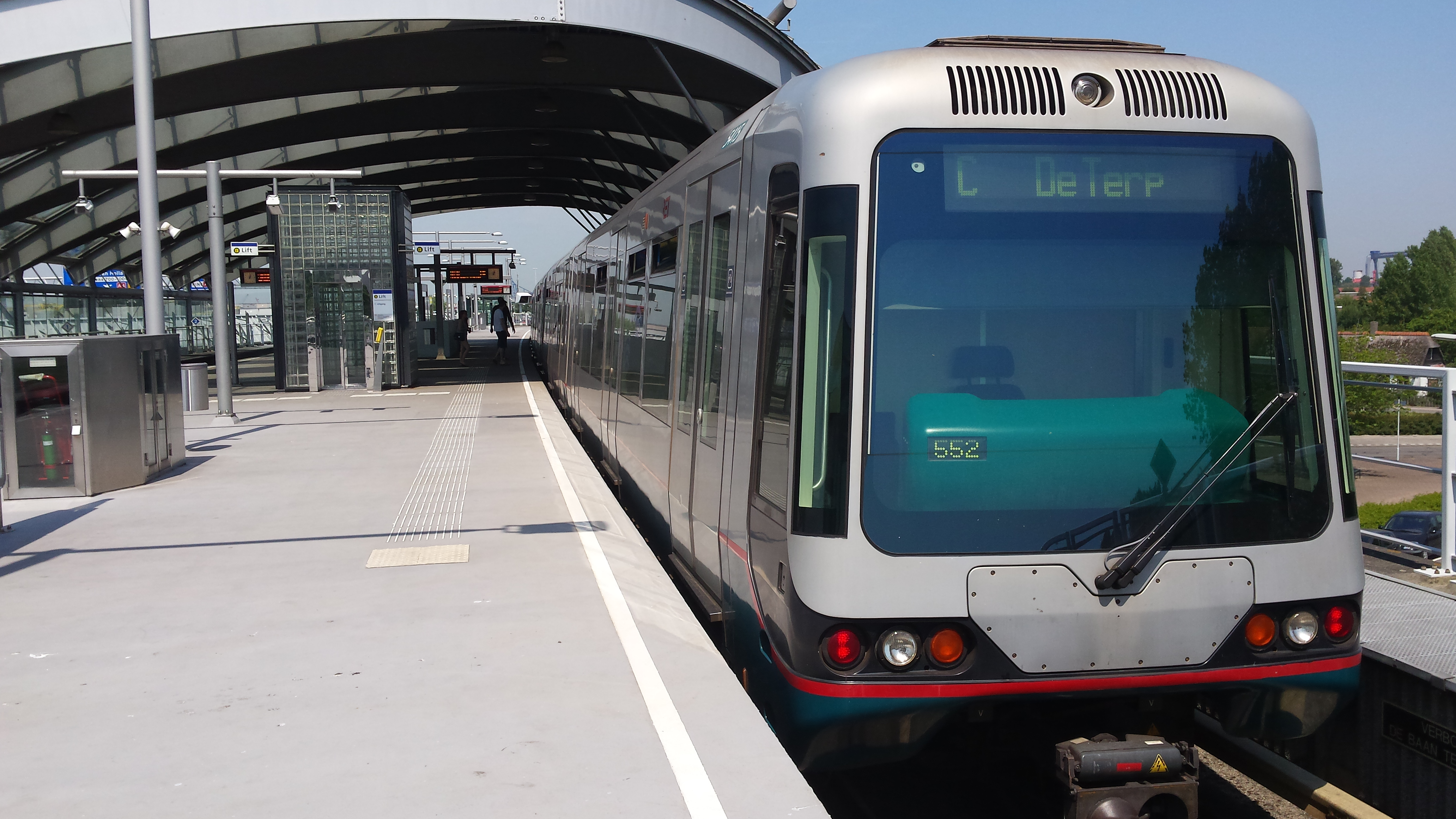
- Pernis metro station

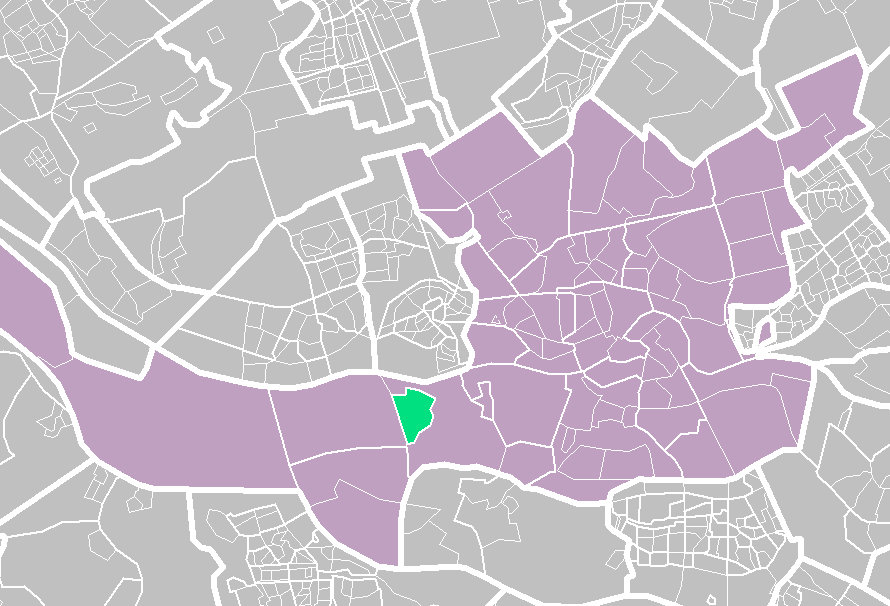
- Pernis (light green) within Rotterdam (purple).
- Country: Netherlands
- Province: South Holland
- Municipality1.: Rotterdam

Population
  - Total: 4,789
- Website: https://www.rotterdam.nl/pernis

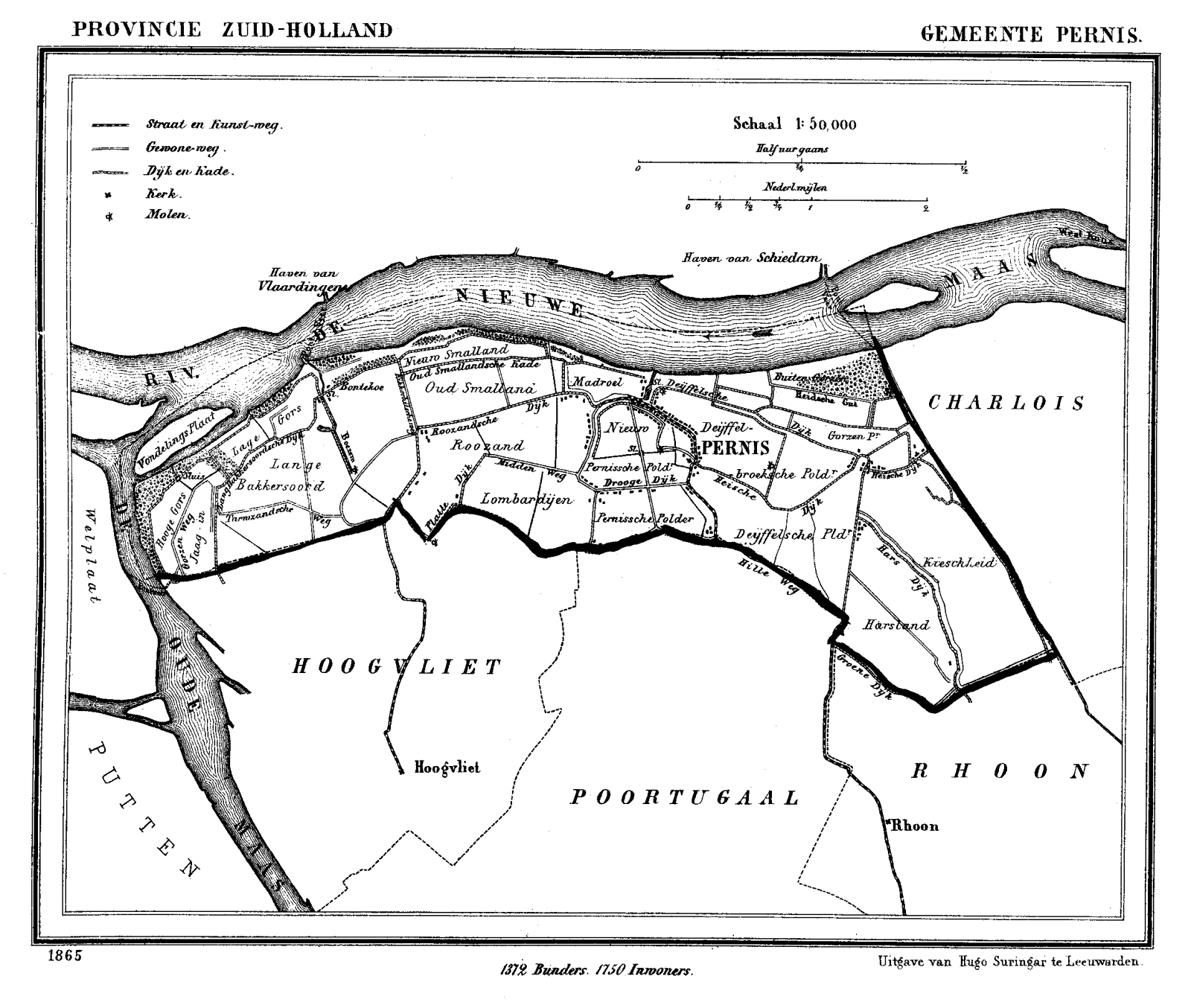
Pernis in 1865.

Pernis (Dutch pronunciation: [pɛrˈnɪs]) is a neighborhood and submunicipality (since 3 March 2010) of Rotterdam, Netherlands. The district has a population of 4,845 (2018) on a total area size of 1.60 km^{2} (0.62 sq mi). Pernis is thus a full submunicipality of Rotterdam, but the former independent municipality had its own district council already. Although surrounded by ports, Pernis has preserved its village-like atmosphere very well.

Pernis is best known for its petrochemical industry. Refineries define its skyline. Shell's sprawling complex located there is the largest oil refinery in Europe, and one of the largest in the world.

Pernis was merged with 's-Gravenambacht in 1832. It remained an independent municipality until 1934, when it was merged into Rotterdam.

== Demography ==
Residents by age (2011)

Age	Number	%
0 t/m 4 year	279	5,8%
5 t/m 9 year	267	5,6%
10 t/m 14 year	273	5,7%
15 t/m 19 year	264	5,5%
20 t/m 34 year	855	17,9%
35 t/m 54 year	1.455	30,4%
55 t/m 64 year	592	12,4%
65 t/m 79 year	580	12,1%
80 years and older	224	4,7%
Total	4789	100%

Births and deaths(2010)

	Number	by 1000 inhabitants
Birth	54	11,2
Deceased	40	8,3

Residents by origin (2011)

Origin	Number	%
Dutch	3998	84%
Not-Western immigrant	440	9%
Western immigrant	351	7%
Total	4789	100%

Household composition (2011)

Type of household	Number	%
One-person household	675	30,8%
Couple without children	668	30,4%
Couple with children	590	27%
One-parent household with children	195	8,9%
Other households	65	3%
Total	2193	100%

== Born in Pernis ==
- Sjaak Troost (born 1959) – Feyenoord football (soccer) defender

== See also ==
- Langebakkersoord
- Rotterdam Metro
