= Wim Thomassen =

Dutch politician

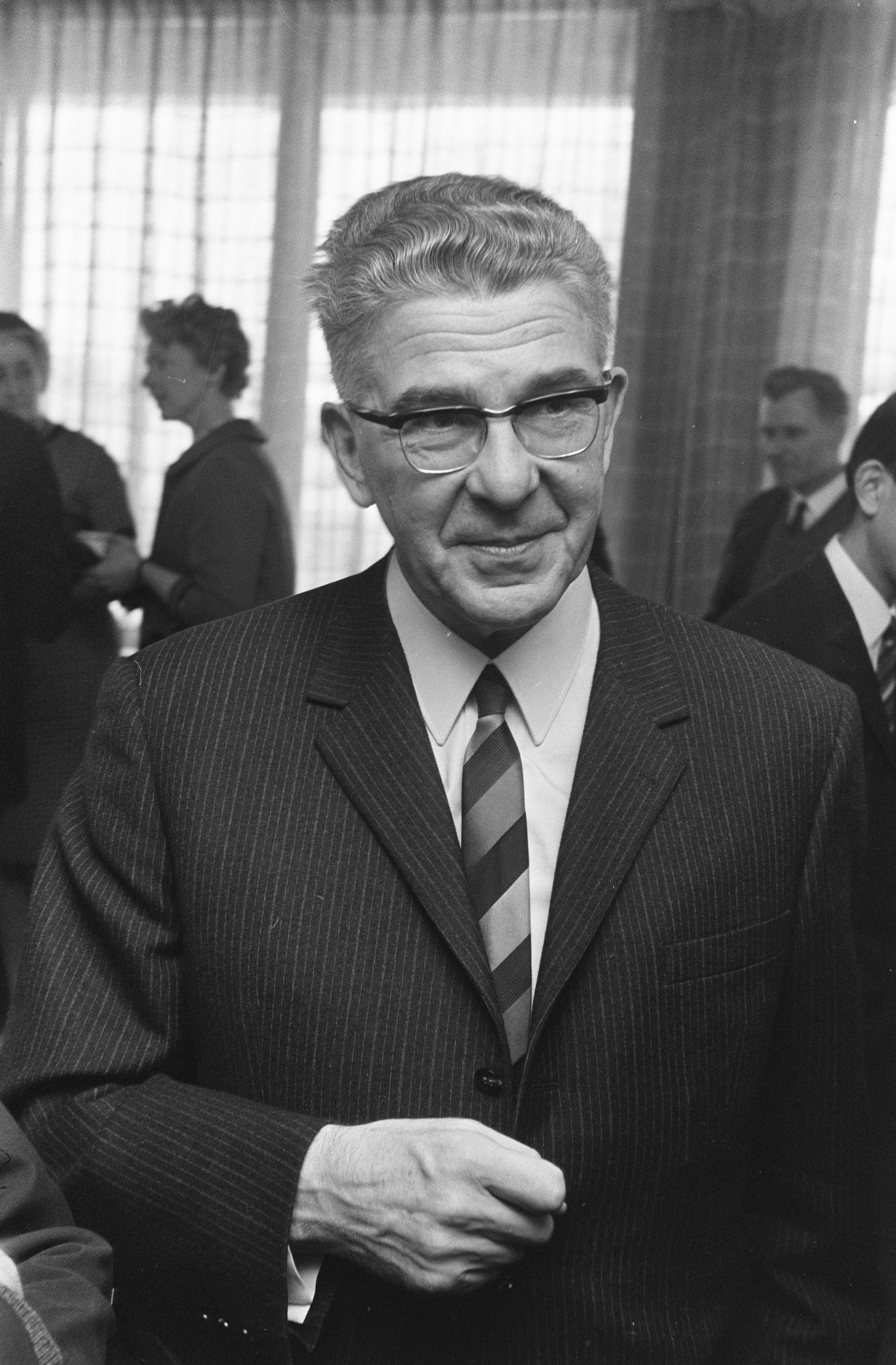

Mayor of Rotterdam
- In office 16 April 1965 – 1 November 1974
- Preceded by: Gerard van Walsum
- Succeeded by: André van der Louw (Minus Polak acting)

Mayor of Enschede
- In office 1 May 1958 – 16 April 1965
- Preceded by: Meine van Veen
- Succeeded by: Auke Johannes Vleer

Mayor of Zaandam
- In office 16 May 1948 – 1 May 1958
- Preceded by: Joris in 't Veld
- Succeeded by: Gerrit Franken

Member of the Senate
- In office 7 November 1961 – 10 May 1971

Member of the Provincial Council of North Holland
- In office 6 July 1954 – 1 May 1958

Member of the House of Representatives
- In office 31 July 1946 – 27 July 1948

Personal details
- Born: Willem Thomassen; 3 October 1909 Amsterdam, Netherlands
- Died: 16 June 2001 (aged 91) Bergen, Netherlands
- Party: Labour Party (PvdA) (from 1946)
- Other political affiliations: Social Democratic Workers' Party (SDAP) (until 1946)
- Spouse: An Thomassen
- Occupation: Politician · Schoolteacher

Willem "Wim" Thomassen (3 October 1909 – 16 June 2001) was a Dutch politician of the Labour Party (PvdA).

Thomassen was born in Amsterdam. He was a schoolteacher and during World War II imprisoned by the Germans in Amsterdam from 1943 until January 1944.

After the war he was secretary of the Dutch People's Movement from August 1945 until July 1946.

On behalf of the Labour Party he was a member of the House of Representatives from July 1946 until July 1948.

Hereafter he was mayor of three municipalities: Zaandam (1948–1958), Enschede (1958–1965), and at last Rotterdam (1965–1974). In his last capacity he contributed significantly to the development of the Port of Rotterdam

Besides he was a member of the Provincial council of North Holland from July 1954 until May 1958, and a member of the Senate from November 1961 until May 1971.

His wife was also a schoolteacher. Wim Thomassen died at age 91 in Bergen (North Holland).

Political offices
Preceded by Joris in 't Veld	Mayor of Zaandam; 1948–1958	Succeeded by Gerrit Franken
Preceded by Meine van Veen	Mayor of Enschede; 1958–1965	Succeeded by Auke Johannes Vleer
Preceded by Gerard van Walsum	Mayor of Rotterdam; 1965–1974	Succeeded by André van der Louw
