= Biesheuvel cabinet =

Biesheuvel cabinet may refer to:

- First Biesheuvel cabinet (1971-1972)
- Second Biesheuvel cabinet (1972-1973)
