= Johan Witteveen =

Managing Director of the International Monetary Fund (1973–1978)

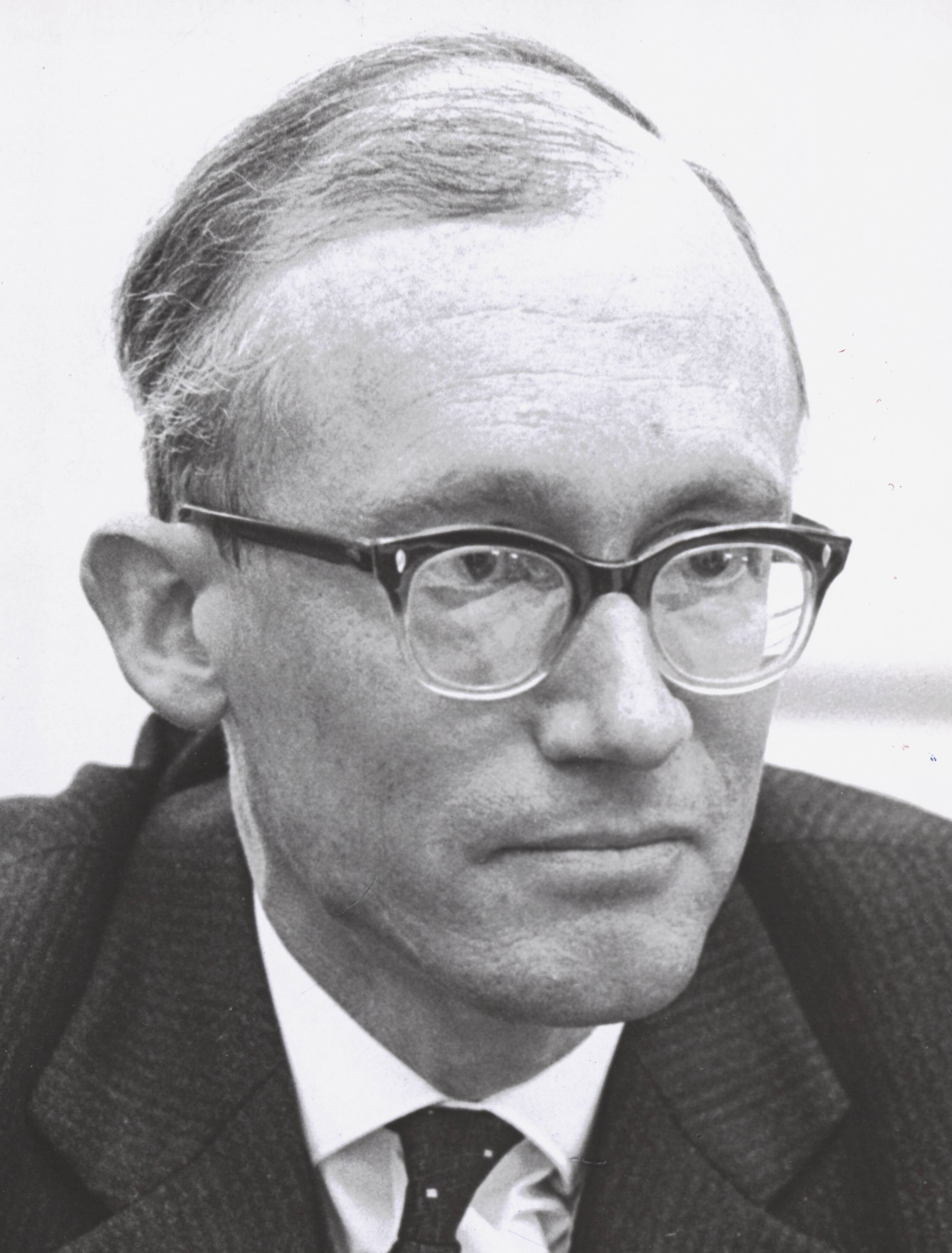
- Witteveen in 1964

Managing Director of the International Monetary Fund
- In office 1 September 1973 – 18 June 1978
- Preceded by: Pierre-Paul Schweitzer
- Succeeded by: Jacques de Larosière

Minister of Economic Affairs
- Acting
- In office 7 January 1970 – 14 January 1970
- Prime Minister: Piet de Jong
- Preceded by: Leo de Block
- Succeeded by: Roelof Nelissen

Deputy Prime Minister of the Netherlands
- In office 5 April 1967 – 6 July 1971 Serving with Joop Bakker
- Prime Minister: Piet de Jong
- Preceded by: Jan de Quay; Barend Biesheuvel
- Succeeded by: Roelof Nelissen; Molly Geertsema

Minister of Finance
- In office 5 April 1967 – 6 July 1971
- Prime Minister: Piet de Jong
- Preceded by: Jelle Zijlstra
- Succeeded by: Roelof Nelissen
- In office 24 July 1963 – 14 April 1965
- Prime Minister: Victor Marijnen
- Preceded by: Jelle Zijlstra
- Succeeded by: Anne Vondeling

Member of the House of Representatives
- In office 21 September 1965 – 5 April 1967
- In office 5 June 1963 – 24 July 1963

Member of the Senate
- In office 8 June 1971 – 1 September 1973
- In office 23 December 1958 – 5 June 1963

Member of the Social and Economic Council
- In office 1 February 1952 – 23 December 1958
- Chairman: Frans de Vries (1952–1958); Gerard Verrijn Stuart (1958)

Personal details
- Born: Hendrikus Johannes Witteveen; 12 June 1921 Zeist, Netherlands
- Died: 23 April 2019 (aged 97) Wassenaar, Netherlands
- Party: People's Party for Freedom and Democracy
- Spouse: Liesbeth de Vries Feijens (m. 1949; died 2006)
- Children: 4 (including Willem)
- Parent: Willem Gerrit Witteveen (father)
- Relatives: Theo van Gogh (cousin)
- Education: Rotterdam School of Economics (BEc, MEc, PhD)
- Occupation: Politician; economist

Hendrikus Johannes "Johan" Witteveen (12 June 1921 – 23 April 2019) was a Dutch politician and economist who served as the fifth managing director of the International Monetary Fund (IMF) from 1973 to 1978.

Witteveen attended the Gymnasium Erasmianum in Rotterdam from June 1933 until June 1939 and applied at the Rotterdam School of Economics in June 1939 majoring in Economics. On 10 May 1940 Nazi Germany invaded the Netherlands and the government fled to London to escape the German occupation. During the German occupation Witteveen continued his study obtaining a Bachelor of Economics degree in June 1941 but in April 1943 the German occupation authority closed the Rotterdam School of Economics. Following the end of World War II Witteveen returned to the Rotterdam School of Economics and worked as a student researcher before graduating with a Master of Economics degree in December 1945 and worked as an associate professor of Financial economics at the Rotterdam School of Economics from December 1945 until July 1947 when got a doctorate as a Doctor of Philosophy in Financial economics. Witteveen worked as a researcher for the Bureau for Economic Policy Analysis (CPB) from April 1945 until July 1947 and as a professor of Financial economics at the Rotterdam School of Economics from July 1947 until 24 July 1963. He also served as Rector Magnificus of the Erasmus University Rotterdam from 1 January 1951 until 1 January 1952.

Witteveen became a Member of the Senate after the death of Anthonie Nicolaas Molenaar, taking office on 23 December 1958 serving as a frontbencher and spokesperson for Finances and deputy spokesperson for Economic Affairs and Small business. Witteveen was elected as a Member of the House of Representatives after the election of 1963, he subsequently resigned as a Member of the Senate the same day he was installed as Member of the House of Representatives, taking office on 5 June 1963. Following the cabinet formation of 1963 Witteveen was appointed as Minister of Finance in the Cabinet Marijnen, taking office on 24 July 1963. The Cabinet Marijnen fell on 27 February 1965 after a disagreement in the coalition about reforms to the public broadcasting system and continued to serve in a demissionary capacity until the cabinet formation of 1965 when it was replaced by the Cals cabinet on 14 April 1965. Witteveen returned as a distinguished professor of Public economics at the Rotterdam School of Economics on 1 September 1965. Witteveen subsequently returned as a Member of the House of Representatives after the resignation of Lambertus Oldenbanning, taking office on 21 September 1965 serving as a frontbencher chairing the parliamentary committee for Finances and spokesperson for Finances and deputy spokesperson for Economic Affairs. After the election of 1967 Witteveen was again appointed as Minister of Finance and became Deputy Prime Minister in the De Jong cabinet, taking office on 5 April 1967. Witteveen served as acting Minister of Economic Affairs from 7 January 1970 until 14 January 1970 following Leo de Block's resignation. In February 1971 Witteveen announced that he wouldn't stand for the election of 1971 but wanted to return to the Senate. After the Senate election of 1971 Witteveen returned as a Member of the Senate, taking office on 8 June 1971 serving as a frontbencher chairing the parliamentary committee for Finances and spokesperson for Finances and Economic Affairs. Following the cabinet formation of 1971 Witteveen per his own request asked not to be considered for a cabinet post in the new cabinet, the Cabinet De Jong was replaced by the Cabinet Biesheuvel I on 6 July 1971. In August 1973 Witteveen was nominated as the next Managing Director of the International Monetary Fund (IMF), he resigned as a Member of the Senate the same day he was installed as Managing Director, serving from 1 September 1973 until 18 June 1978.

Witteveen retired after spending 20 years in national politics and became active in the private sector and public sector and occupied numerous seats as a corporate director and nonprofit director on several boards of directors and supervisory boards (Rockefeller Foundation, Tinbergen Institute, Group of Thirty, Institute of International Relations Clingendael, Society for Statistics and Operations Research and the Helen Dowling Institute) and served on several state commissions and councils on behalf of the government (SEO Economic Research, Cadastre Agency and Statistics Netherlands) and as an advocate and lobbyist for Sufism and Financial regulation. Witteveen was also a prolific author, having written more than a dozen books since 1947 about Politics, Finances, Economics, Business and Sufism.

Witteveen was known for his abilities as a manager and consensus builder. Witteveen continued to comment on political affairs as a statesman until his death at the age of 97 and holds the distinction as the only Dutchman that served as Managing Director of the International Monetary Fund. His eldest son Willem was also a politician, professor, and author, he like his father had served in the Senate.

== Early life and education ==
Witteveen was born on 12 June 1921 in Zeist in the province of Utrecht. He is the son of architect Willem Gerrit Witteveen and Anna Maria Wibaut and the grandson of Social Democratic politician Floor Wibaut. He went to the public secondary school Gymnasium Erasmianum in Rotterdam. He studied economics at the Netherlands School of Economics from 1939 to 1946. He received his PhD in 1947 with the dissertation Loonhoogte en werkgelegenheid (Height of wages and employment). His advisor was Nobel Prize laureate Jan Tinbergen.

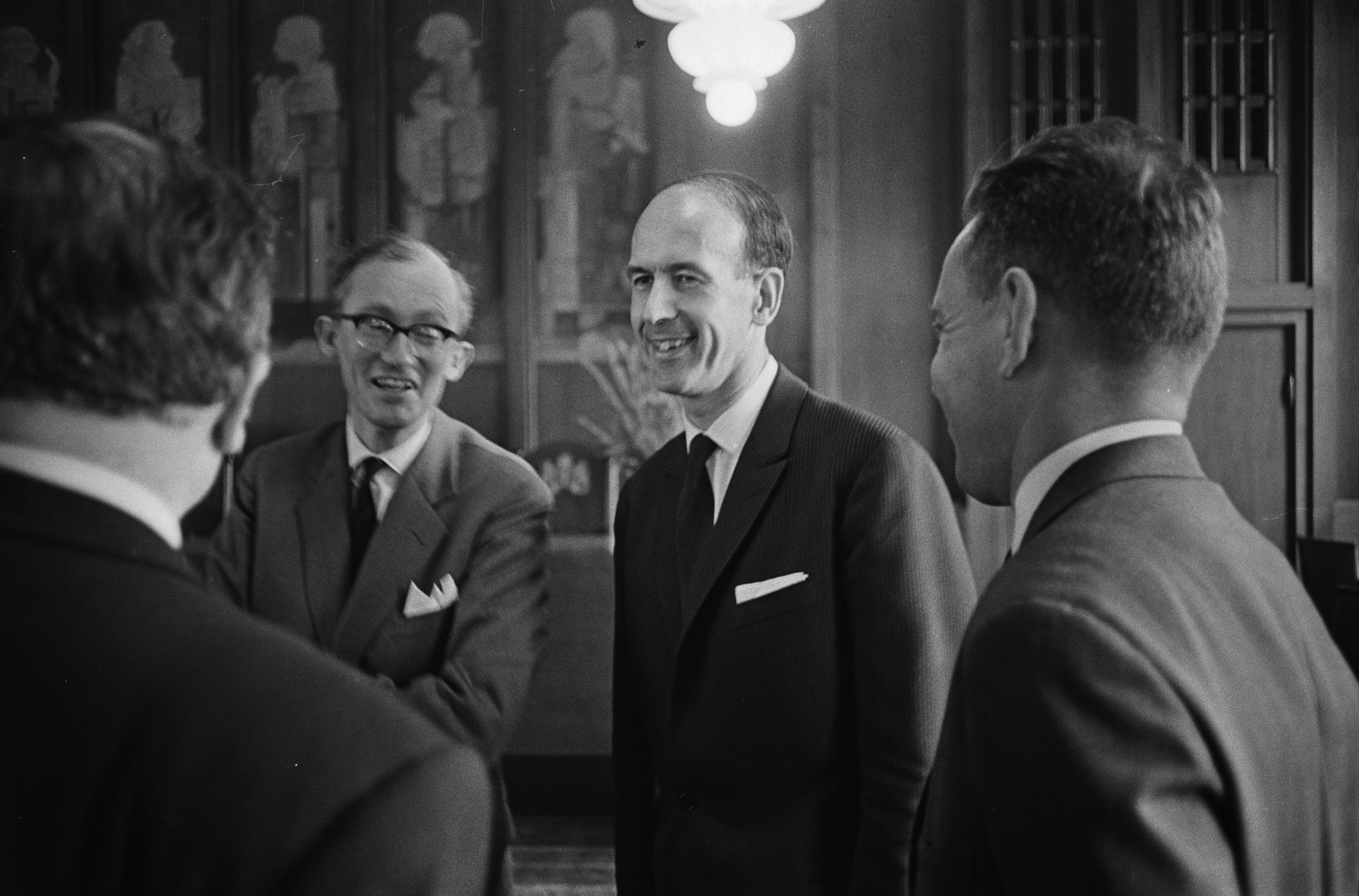
Minister of Finance Johan Witteveen and Minister of the Economy and Finance of France Valéry Giscard d'Estaing during a European Economic Community meeting in Amsterdam on 20 July 1964.

== Career ==
Witteveen worked as an economist at the Bureau for Economic Policy Analysis under Jan Tinbergen and Fred Polak from 1947 until 1963. He is a member of the People's Party for Freedom and Democracy (VVD). He served as a Senator from 23 December 1958 until 5 June 1963 and as a member of the House of Representatives from 5 June 1963 until 24 July 1963.

He then became Minister of Finance in the Marijnen cabinet serving from 24 July 1963 until 14 April 1965. He then served as a Member of the House of Representatives again from 21 September 1965 until 5 April 1967, when he returned as Minister of Finance and Deputy Prime Minister serving from 5 April 1967 until 6 July 1971 in the De Jong cabinet. He again returned to the Senate, serving from 8 June 1971 until 1 September 1973.

Afterwards he became the Managing Director of the International Monetary Fund, serving from 1 September 1973 until 18 June 1978. From 1978 to 1985 he was the first chairman of the Washington-based economics body, the Group of Thirty. He became member of the Royal Netherlands Academy of Arts and Sciences in 1980.

== Personal life ==
On 3 March 1949 Witteveen married Liesbeth de Vries Feijens (born 1 April 1920). They had four children, three sons, and one daughter: Willem Witteveen (1952–2014), Paul Witteveen (1955–1979), Raoul Witteveen and their daughter (born 1960). Liesbeth de Vries Feijens died on 25 November 2006 at the age of 86. His eldest son Willem Witteveen was also a politician, professor and author, he like his father had served in the Senate. Willem Witteveen, his wife and daughter died on 17 July 2014 when Malaysia Airlines Flight 17 was shot down over Ukraine. Witteveen was also a first cousin once removed of the in 2004 murdered filmmaker Theo van Gogh. Witteveen died on 23 April 2019 in his home in Wassenaar at the age of 97 years, 315 days.

== Decorations ==
Honours
Ribbon bar	Honour	Country	Date	Comment
	Grand Officer of the Legion of Honour	France	25 August 1964	
	Grand Cross of the Order of the Crown	Belgium	1968	
	Honorary Knight Commander of the Order of the British Empire	United Kingdom	1969	
	Grand Cross of the Order of the Oak Crown	Luxembourg	1970	
	Grand Officer of the Order of Orange-Nassau	Netherlands	17 July 1971	Elevated from Commander (20 April 1965)
	Grand Cross of the Order of Merit	Germany	12 October 1977	
	Commander of the Order of the Netherlands Lion	Netherlands	25 April 1979	

Awards
Ribbon bar	Awards	Organization	Date	Comment
	Four Freedoms Award	Roosevelt Institute for American Studies	1982	

== Honorary degrees ==
Honorary degrees
University	Field	Country	Date	Comment
Erasmus University Rotterdam	Economics	Netherlands	1979	

== Bibliography ==
- Witteveen, H.J. (2 March 1999). The Heart of Sufism: Essential Writings of Hazrat Inayat Khan. Shambhala Press. ISBN 9781570624025.
- Witteveen, H.J. (1 January 1997). Universal Sufism. Element Books Ltd. ISBN 9781862040939.
- Witteveen, H.J. (11 January 2003). Sufism in Action: Achievement, Inspiration and Integrity in a Tough World. Vega. ISBN 9781843336938.
- Witteveen, H.J. (1 March 2003). Sufism in Action: Spiritualising the Economy. Vega. ISBN 978-1843336938.

Party political offices
Preceded by Harm van Riel	Vice Chairman of the People's Party for Freedom and Democracy; 1963	Succeeded by Hans Roelen
Political offices
Preceded by Jelle Zijlstra	Minister of Finance; 1963–1965; 1967–1971	Succeeded by Anne Vondeling
Preceded by Jelle Zijlstra	Minister of Finance; 1963–1965; 1967–1971	Succeeded by Roelof Nelissen
Preceded by Jan de Quay	Deputy Prime Minister; 1967–1971; With: Joop Bakker	Succeeded by Roelof Nelissen
Preceded by Barend Biesheuvel	Deputy Prime Minister; 1967–1971; With: Joop Bakker	Succeeded by Molly Geertsema
Preceded by Leo de Block	Minister of Economic Affairs; Ad interim 1970	Succeeded by Roelof Nelissen
Diplomatic posts
Preceded by Pierre-Paul Schweitzer	Managing Director of the International Monetary Fund; 1973–1978	Succeeded by Jacques de Larosière
Non-profit organization positions
Preceded by Office established	Chairman of the Supervisory board of the Helen Dowling Institute; 1988–1994	Succeeded by Leendert Ginjaar
Academic offices
Preceded by Henk Lambers	Rector Magnificus of the Erasmus University Rotterdam; 1951–1952	Succeeded by Hans Kernkamp
Records
Preceded by Piet de Jong	Oldest living former cabinet member 27 July 2016 – 23 April 2019	Succeeded by Els Veder-Smit
Preceded by Gérard Mertens	Oldest living former member of the States General; 12 November 2018 – 23 April 2019	Succeeded by Bart Hofman
