= Joop Bakker =

Dutch politician (1921–2003)

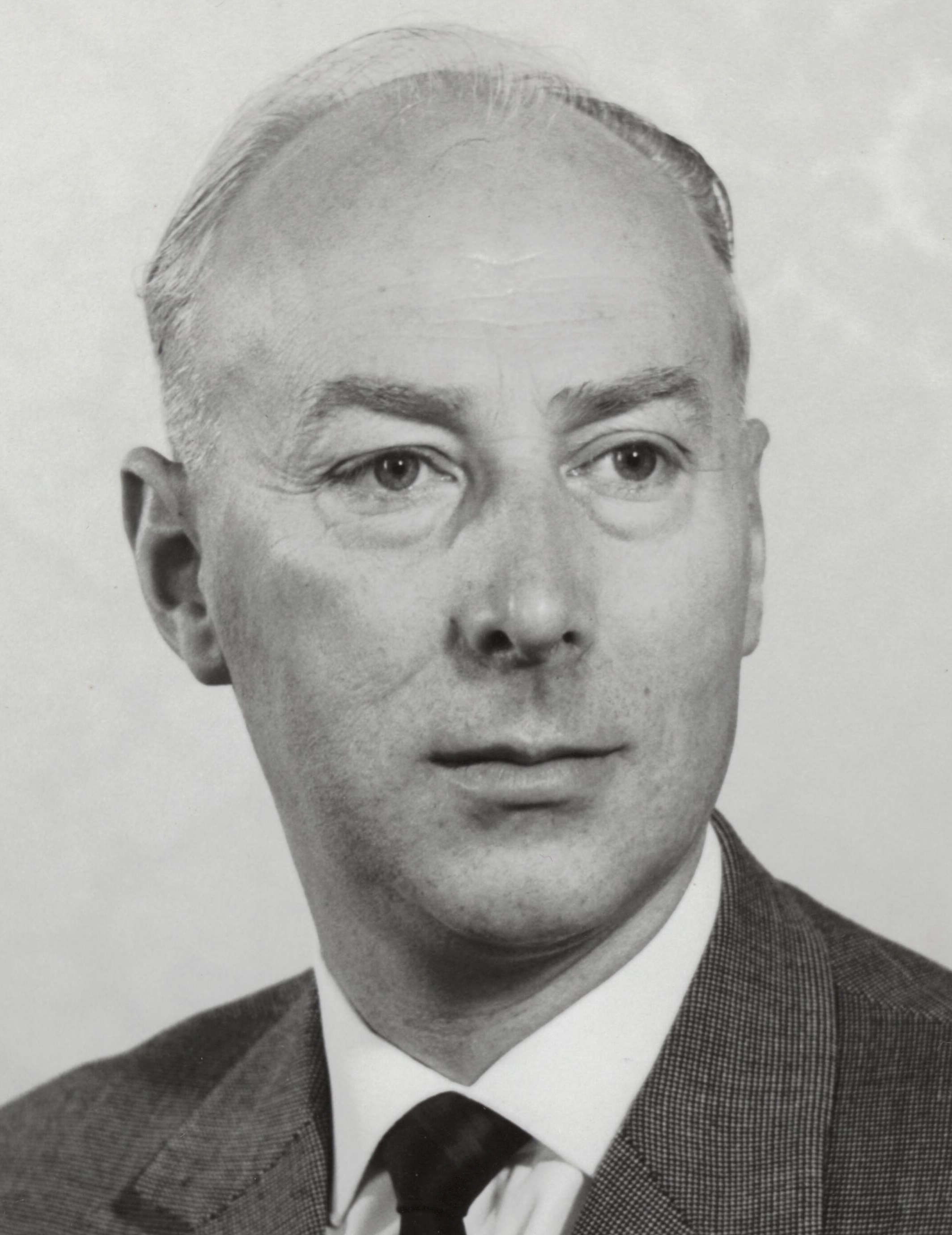
- Bakker in 1963

Member of the House of Representatives
- In office 11 May 1971 – 15 February 1972
- Parliamentary group: Anti-Revolutionary Party

Deputy Prime Minister
- In office 5 April 1967 – 6 July 1971 Serving with Johan Witteveen
- Prime Minister: Piet de Jong
- Preceded by: Jan de Quay; Barend Biesheuvel
- Succeeded by: Roelof Nelissen; Molly Geertsema

Minister of Transport and Water Management
- In office 5 April 1967 – 6 July 1971
- Prime Minister: Piet de Jong
- Preceded by: Jan de Quay
- Succeeded by: Willem Drees Jr.

Minister for Suriname and Netherlands Antilles Affairs
- In office 5 April 1967 – 6 July 1971
- Prime Minister: Piet de Jong
- Preceded by: Barend Biesheuvel
- Succeeded by: Roelof Nelissen

Minister of Economic Affairs
- In office 22 November 1966 – 5 April 1967
- Prime Minister: Jelle Zijlstra
- Preceded by: Joop den Uyl
- Succeeded by: Leo de Block

State Secretary for Economic Affairs
- In office 3 September 1963 – 22 November 1966
- Prime Minister: Victor Marijnen (1963–1965); Jo Cals (1965–1966)
- Preceded by: Frans Gijzels
- Succeeded by: Louis van Son

Mayor of Hoogeveen
- In office 30 April 1959 – 3 September 1963
- Preceded by: Jetze Tjalma
- Succeeded by: Jacobus de Goede

Mayor of Andijk
- In office 1 January 1955 – 30 April 1959
- Preceded by: Hendrik Douma
- Succeeded by: IJsbrand de Zeeuw

Personal details
- Born: Johannes Age Bakker; 27 May 1921 Bolsward, Netherlands
- Died: 3 October 2003 (aged 82) Wassenaar, Netherlands
- Party: Christian Democratic Appeal (from 1980)
- Other political affiliations: Anti-Revolutionary Party (until 1980)
- Spouse: Meikelina Vegter (m. 1948)
- Children: Age Bakker (born 1950)
- Education: Rotterdam School of Economics (Bachelor of Economics, Master of Economics)
- Occupation: Politician · Civil servant · Economist · Businessman · Corporate director · Nonprofit director · Lobbyist

Johannes Age "Joop" Bakker (27 May 1921 – 3 October 2003) was a Dutch politician of the defunct Anti-Revolutionary Party (ARP) now merged into the Christian Democratic Appeal (CDA) party and businessman.

== Biography ==
Bakker applied at the Rotterdam School of Economics in June 1941 majoring in economics during the German occupation. Bakker continued his studies and obtainined a Bachelor of Economics degree in February 1943, but in April 1943 the German occupation authority closed the Rotterdam School of Economics. Following the end of World War II, Bakker returned to the Rotterdam School of Economics before graduating with a Master of Economics degree in July 1949. Bakker served on the Municipal Council of Bolsward from September 1945 until January 1955 and served as an alderman in Bolsward from June 1946 until January 1955. Bakker worked as a corporate director for the manufacturing company J.A. Bakker en Zoon in Bolsward from July 1949 until January 1955. In December 1954 Bakker was nominated as Mayor of Andijk, taking office on 1 January 1955. In March 1959 Bakker was nominated as Mayor of Hoogeveen, he resigned as Mayor of Andijk the same day he took office as Mayor of Hoogeveen. taking office on 30 April 1959. After the election of 1963 Bakker was appointed as State Secretary for Economic Affairs in the Cabinet Marijnen, taking office on 3 September 1963. The Cabinet Marijnen fell on 27 February 1965 and continued to serve in a demissionary capacity until the cabinet formation of 1965 when it was replaced by the Cabinet Cals with Bakker continuing as State Secretary for Economic Affairs, taking office on 14 April 1965. The Cabinet Cals fell just one year later on 14 October 1966 and continued to serve in a demissionary capacity until it was replaced by the caretaker Cabinet Zijlstra with Bakker appointed as Minister of Economic Affairs, taking office on 22 November 1966. After the election of 1967 Bakker was appointed as deputy prime minister, Minister of Transport and Water Management and Minister for Suriname and Netherlands Antilles Affairs in the Cabinet De Jong, taking office on 5 April 1967. Bakker was elected as a member of the House of Representatives after the election of 1971, taking office on 11 May 1971. Following the cabinet formation of 1971 Bakker was not giving a cabinet post in the new cabinet, the Cabinet De Jong was replaced by the Cabinet Biesheuvel I on 6 July 1971 and he continued to serve in the House of Representatives as a backbencher.

In January 1971 Bakker was nominated as CEO and chairman of the board of directors of Ago Insurance; he resigned as a member of the House of Representatives the same day he became CEO and chairman of Ago Insurance serving from 15 February 1972 until 1 January 1983. In December 1982 Ago Insurance and Ennia N.V. choose to merge to form the Aegon N.V. with Bakker appointed as CEO and chairman of the board of directors serving from 1 January 1983 until 1 January 1984. Bakker also became active in the private sector and public sector and occupied numerous seats as a corporate director and nonprofit director on several boards of directors and supervisory boards (ING Group, Zilveren Kruis) and served on several state commissions and councils on behalf of the government (Staatsbosbeheer, Netherlands Cadastre Agency, Sociale Verzekeringsbank and Public Pension Funds PFZW) and as a diplomat and lobbyist for several economic delegations on behalf of the government. Bakker later served as chairman of the supervisory board of the DSM Company from 1 May 1984 until 1 July 1988.

Bakker was known for his abilities as a manager and negotiator. Bakker continued to comment on political affairs until his death at the age of 83.

== Decorations ==
Honours
Ribbon bar	Honour	Country	Date	Comment
	Grand Officer of the Order of Leopold II	Belgium	12 August 1968	
	Knight Commander of the Order of Merit	Germany	20 September 1970	
	Commander of the Order of the Netherlands Lion	Netherlands	17 July 1971	
	Grand Officer of the Order of Orange-Nassau	Netherlands	10 December 1990	

Political offices
Preceded by Hendrik Douma	Mayor of Andijk; 1955–1959	Succeeded by Jacobus de Goede
Preceded by Jetze Tjalma	Mayor of Hoogeveen; 1959–1963	Succeeded by IJsbrand de Zeeuw
Preceded by Frans Gijzels	State Secretary for Economic Affairs; 1963–1966	Succeeded by Louis van Son
Preceded by Joop den Uyl	Minister of Economic Affairs; 1966–1976	Succeeded by Leo de Block
Preceded by Jan de Quay	Deputy Prime Minister; 1967–1971; With: Johan Witteveen	Succeeded by Roelof Nelissen
Preceded by Barend Biesheuvel	Deputy Prime Minister; 1967–1971; With: Johan Witteveen	Succeeded by Molly Geertsema
Preceded by Jan de Quay	Minister of Transport and Water Management; 1967–1971	Succeeded by Willem Drees Jr.
Preceded by Barend Biesheuvel	Minister for Suriname and Netherlands Antilles Affairs; 1967–1971	Succeeded by Roelof Nelissen
Civic offices
Unknown	Chairman of the Supervisory board of the Netherlands Cadastre Agency; 1982–1986	Succeeded by Gijs van Aardenne
Preceded by Edzo Toxopeus	Chairman of the Supervisory board of Staatsbosbeheer; 1983–1988	Succeeded by Gijs van Aardenne
Preceded by Koos Verdam	Chairman of the Supervisory board of National Insurance Bank; 1984–1990	Succeeded by Wil Albeda
Business positions
Unknown	CEO and Chairman of the Board of directors of Ago Insurance; 1972–1983	Succeeded by Office discontinued
Preceded by Office established	CEO and Chairman of the Board of directors of Aegon N.V. 1983–1984	Unknown
Unknown	Chairman of the Supervisory board of the DSM Company; 1984–1988	Succeeded by Gijs van Aardenne
