= Willem Witteveen =

Dutch politician (1952–2014)

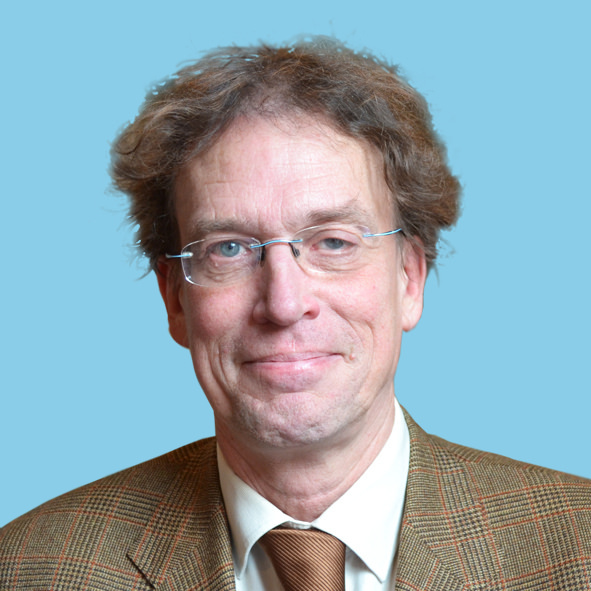
- Witteveen in January 2014

Member of the Senate
- In office 15 January 2013 – 17 July 2014
- In office 8 June 1999 – 12 June 2007

Personal details
- Born: Willem Johannes Witteveen; 5 May 1952 Rotterdam, Netherlands
- Died: 17 July 2014 (aged 62) Malaysian Airlines Flight 17, near Hrabove, Ukraine
- Cause of death: Aircraft shootdown
- Party: Labour Party (1994–2014)
- Spouse: Lidwien Heerkens (m. 1978; died 2014)
- Children: Marit (died 2014); Freek
- Parents: Johan Witteveen; Liesbeth de Vries Feijens
- Education: Leiden University
- Occupation: Politician, professor, author

Willem Johannes Witteveen (Dutch pronunciation: [ˈʋɪləm joˈɦɑnəs ˈʋɪtəˌveːn]; 5 May 1952 – 17 July 2014) was a Dutch legal scholar, politician, and author. He was a law professor at Tilburg University (1990–2014) and a Member of the Senate for the Labour Party (1999–2007; 2013–2014). He was also the author of several books about law and politics. Witteveen was killed on 17 July 2014 when the flight he was travelling on, Malaysia Airlines Flight 17, was shot down over eastern Ukraine.

== Early life and education ==
Willem Johannes Witteveen was born on 5 May 1952 in Rotterdam in the Netherlands.

He was the son of liberal politician Johan Witteveen and Liesbeth de Vries Feijens. He was also the great-grandson of social-democratic politician Floor Wibaut. He had three brothers and a sister.

He went to a public primary Montessori school in Rotterdam and to the public secondary school Rijnlands Lyceum (1964–1970) in Wassenaar. He studied Dutch law at Leiden University (1970–1978) in Leiden.

== Career ==
From 1979 to 1989, he worked as researcher of constitutional law at Leiden University. In 1988, he received his PhD cum laude with the dissertation De retoriek in het recht (The rhetorics of law). From 1990 to his death, he was a law professor at Tilburg University. His fields of expertise were trias politica, legislation, rhetoric, legal theory, and political theory.

Witteveen was a member of the Labour Party since 1994. He was chairman of the party platform committee of the Labour Party in 1998–99. He was a member of the Senate from 1999 to 2007, where he was chairman of the committee for Internal Affairs and the High Councils of State. In the 2007 and 2011 Senate elections, he was at an unelectable position on the candidate list.

From 2007 to his death, he was founding dean of the College of Liberal Arts at Tilburg University. From 2013 to his death, he was again a senator. He was appointed after Pauline Meurs left the Senate.

Witteveen had finished the manuscript of his book De wet als kunstwerk (The law as work of art) shortly before his death. The book was posthumously released in November 2014.

== Death ==
Witteveen was killed on 17 July 2014 at the age of 62, along with his wife Lidwien Heerkens and their daughter Marit Witteveen. They were passengers on Malaysia Airlines Flight 17 from Schiphol in the Netherlands to Kuala Lumpur in Malaysia, when the airplane was shot down near Hrabove in Ukraine's contested eastern Donetsk region.

== Personal life ==
Like his father, Witteveen was a Universal Sufist. In 1978, he married Lidwien Heerkens; the couple had two children, a daughter Marit and a son Freek. The family lived in Breda in North Brabant. His son Freek later became a quantum computing researcher at Centrum Wiskunde & Informatica.

== Legacy ==
A street in Breda, the Willem Witteveenhof, has been named after Witteveen in 2020. Witteveen lived in the adjacent street, the Burgemeester Passtoorsstraat, at the time of his passing.

== Bibliography ==
Witteveen wrote several non-fiction books about law and politics:

- (1988) De retoriek in het recht (The rhetorics of law)
- (1992) Het theater van de politiek (The theater of politics)
- (1996) De geordende wereld van het recht (The structured world of the law)
- (2000) De denkbeeldige staat (The imaginary state)
- (2002) De sociale rechtsstaat voorbij (Past the welfare state) with Bart van Klink
- (2010) Het wetgevend oordeel (The legislative judgement)
- (2014) De wet als kunstwerk (The law as work of art)
