= Second Biesheuvel cabinet =

Dutch cabinet, 1972 to 1973

- Cabinet of the Netherlands

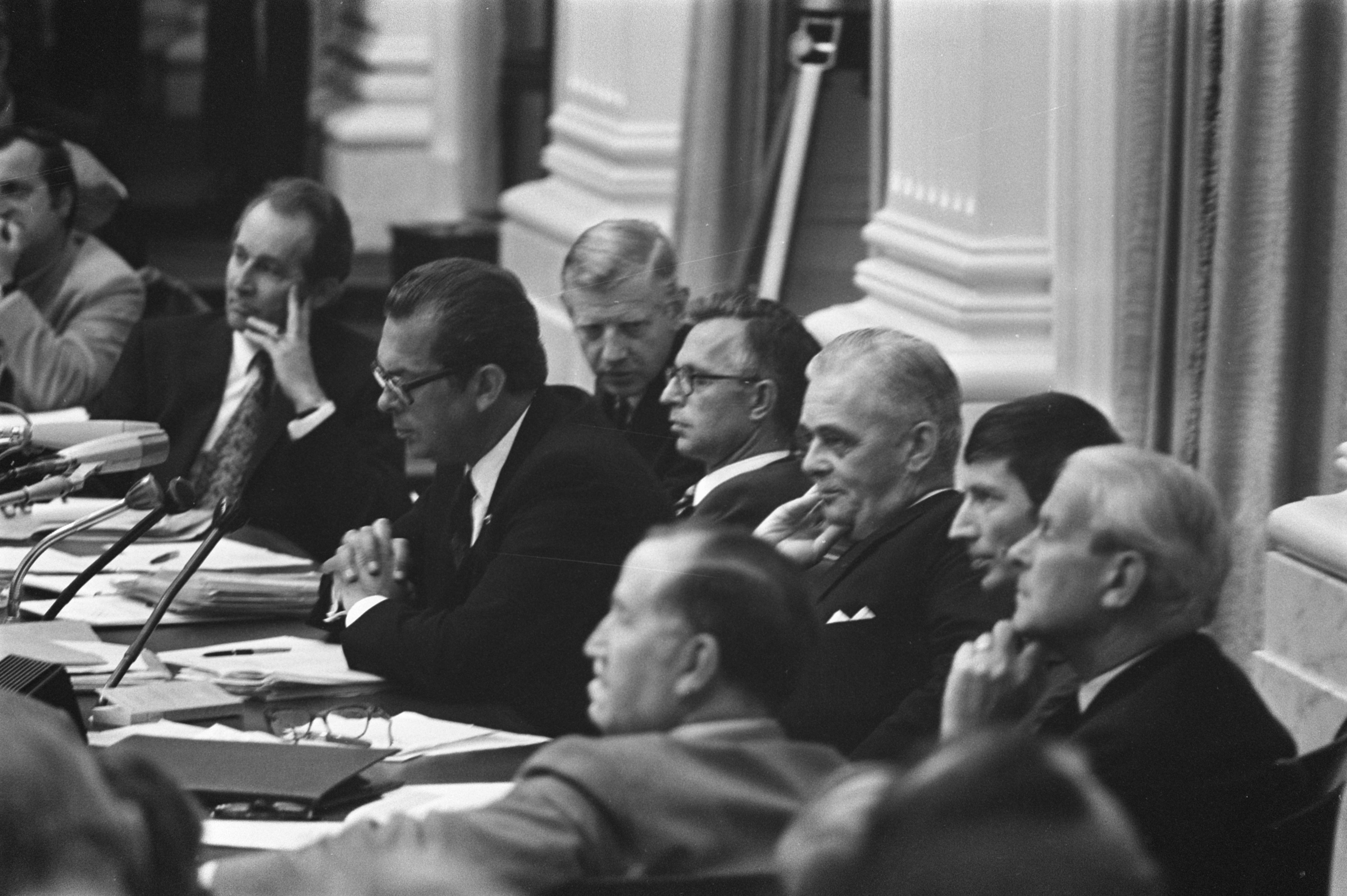
- The members of the Second Biesheuvel cabinet in the House of Representatives on 17 August 1972
- Date formed: 9 August 1972
- Date dissolved: 11 May 1973; 275 days in office (Demissionary from 29 November 1972)

People and organisations
- Head of state: Queen Juliana
- Head of government: Barend Biesheuvel
- Deputy head of government: Roelof Nelissen; Molly Geertsema
- No. of ministers: 14
- Ministers removed: 1
- Total no. of members: 14
- Member party: Catholic People's Party (KVP); People's Party for Freedom and Democracy (VVD); Anti-Revolutionary Party (ARP); Christian Historical Union (CHU)
- Status in legislature: Centre-right Caretaker government

History
- Election: 1971 election
- Outgoing election: 1972 election
- Legislature terms: 1971–1972
- Incoming formation: 1971 formation
- Outgoing formation: 1972–1973 formation
- Predecessor: First Biesheuvel cabinet
- Successor: Den Uyl cabinet

The second Biesheuvel cabinet was the executive branch of the Dutch Government from 9 August 1972 until 11 May 1973. The cabinet was formed by the christian-democratic Catholic People's Party (KVP), Anti-Revolutionary Party (ARP) and Christian Historical Union (CHU) and the conservative-liberal People's Party for Freedom and Democracy (VVD) after the fall of the previous Cabinet Biesheuvel I. The cabinet was a centre-right caretaker government and had a minority in the House of Representatives. Protestant Leader Barend Biesheuvel of the Anti-Revolutionary Party served as Prime Minister. Prominent Catholic politician Roelof Nelissen served as Deputy Prime Minister and Minister of Finance and former Liberal Leader Molly Geertsema served as Deputy Prime Minister and Minister of the Interior. The rump cabinet served until the election of 1972.

== Formation ==
Following the fall of the First Biesheuvel cabinet the Democratic Socialists '70 (DS'70) left the coalition and the Catholic People's Party, People's Party for Freedom and Democracy, Anti-Revolutionary Party and the Christian Historical Union formed a Rump cabinet. Because the following negotiations for forming the next cabinet took rather long, the cabinet took further reaching decisions than a caretaker cabinet is usually supposed to do.

== Cabinet Members ==
Ministers		Title/Ministry/Portfolio(s)			Term of office	Party
Barend Biesheuvel	Barend Biesheuvel (1920–2001)	Prime Minister	General Affairs		6 July 1971 – 11 May 1973^{[Retained]}	Anti-Revolutionary; Party
Roelof Nelissen	Roelof Nelissen (1931–2019)	Deputy; Prime Minister	Finance		6 July 1971 – 11 May 1973^{[Retained]}	Catholic; People's Party
Roelof Nelissen	Roelof Nelissen (1931–2019)	Minister	Finance		6 July 1971 – 11 May 1973^{[Retained]}	Catholic; People's Party
Molly Geertsema	Molly Geertsema (1918–1991)	Deputy; Prime Minister	Interior		6 July 1971 – 11 May 1973^{[Retained]}	People's Party for Freedom and Democracy
Molly Geertsema	Molly Geertsema (1918–1991)	Minister	Interior		6 July 1971 – 11 May 1973^{[Retained]}	People's Party for Freedom and Democracy
Norbert Schmelzer	Norbert Schmelzer (1921–2008)	Minister	Foreign Affairs		6 July 1971 – 11 May 1973^{[Retained]}	Catholic; People's Party
Dries van Agt	Dries van Agt (1931–2024)	Minister	Justice		6 July 1971 – 8 September 1977^{[Retained]} ^{[Continued]}	Catholic; People's Party
Harry Langman	Harrie Langman (1931–2016)	Minister	Economic Affairs		6 July 1971 – 11 May 1973^{[Retained]}	People's Party for Freedom and Democracy
Hans de Koster	Hans de Koster (1914–1992)	Minister	Defence		6 July 1971 – 11 May 1973^{[Retained]}	People's Party for Freedom and Democracy
Louis Stuyt	Dr. Louis Stuyt (1914–2000)	Minister	Health and Environment		6 July 1971 – 11 May 1973^{[Retained]}	Catholic; People's Party
Jaap Boersma	Jaap Boersma (1929–2012)	Minister	Social Affairs		6 July 1971 – 19 December 1977^{[Retained]} ^{[Continued]}	Anti-Revolutionary; Party
Chris van Veen	Chris van Veen (1922–2009)	Minister	Education and Sciences		6 July 1971 – 11 May 1973^{[Retained]}	Christian; Historical Union
Chris van Veen	Chris van Veen (1922–2009)	Minister	Education and Sciences	• Higher; Education • Science	21 July 1972 – 11 May 1973^{[Retained]}	Christian; Historical Union
Bé Udink	Bé Udink (1926–2016)	Minister	Transport and Water Management		21 July 1972 – 11 May 1973^{[Retained]}	Christian; Historical Union
Bé Udink	Bé Udink (1926–2016)	Minister	Housing and Spatial Planning		6 July 1971 – 11 May 1973^{[Retained]}	Christian; Historical Union
Pierre Lardinois	Pierre Lardinois (1924–1987)	Minister	Agriculture and Fisheries		5 April 1967 – 1 January 1973^{[Retained]} ^{[Appt]}	Catholic People's Party
Jaap Boersma	Jaap Boersma (1929–2012)	Minister	Agriculture and Fisheries		1 January 1973 – 11 May 1973^{[Acting]}	Anti-Revolutionary Party
Piet Engels	Piet Engels (1923–1994)	Minister	Culture, Recreation and Social Work		6 July 1971 – 11 May 1973^{[Retained]}	Catholic; People's Party
Ministers without portfolio		Title/Ministry/Portfolio(s)			Term of office	Party
Pierre Lardinois	Pierre Lardinois (1924–1987)	Minister	Interior	• Suriname and Netherlands; Antilles Affairs	28 January 1972 – 1 January 1973^{[Retained]} ^{[Appt]}	Catholic; People's Party
Molly Geertsema	Molly Geertsema (1918–1991)	Minister	Interior	• Suriname and Netherlands; Antilles Affairs	1 January 1973 – 11 May 1973	People's Party for Freedom and Democracy
Kees Boertien	Dr. Kees Boertien (1927–2002)	Minister	Foreign Affairs	• Development; Cooperation	6 July 1971 – 11 May 1973^{[Retained]}	Anti-Revolutionary; Party
State Secretaries		Title/Ministry/Portfolio(s)			Term of office	Party
Tjerk Westerterp	Tjerk Westerterp (1930–2023)	State Secretary	Foreign Affairs	• European Union • Benelux	17 August 1971 – 7 March 1973^{[Retained]} ^{[Res]}	Catholic; People's Party
Willem Scholten	Willem Scholten (1927–2005)	State Secretary	Finance	• Fiscal Policy • Tax and Customs	14 July 1971 – 19 March 1973^{[Retained]} ^{[Res]}	Christian; Historical Union
Fons van der Stee	Fons van der Stee (1928–1999)	State Secretary	Finance	• Governmental; Budget	14 July 1971 – 12 March 1973^{[Retained]} ^{[Res]}	Catholic; People's Party
Hans Grosheide	Hans Grosheide (1930–2022)	State Secretary	Justice	• Immigration and Asylum • Civil Law • Penitentiaries • Youth Justice	28 July 1971 – 11 May 1973^{[Retained]}	Anti-Revolutionary; Party
Jan Oostenbrink	Jan Oostenbrink (1936–2025)	State Secretary	Economic Affairs	• Small and Medium-sized; Businesses • Consumer; Protection • Tourism	17 July 1971 – 11 May 1973^{[Retained]}	Catholic; People's Party
Adri van Es	Vice admiral Adri van Es (1913–1994)	State Secretary	Defence	• Human; Resources • Equipment	14 August 1963 – 16 September 1972^{[Retained]} ^{[Res]}	Anti-Revolutionary; Party
Koos Rietkerk	Koos Rietkerk (1927–1986)	State Secretary	Social Affairs	• Social Security • Unemployment • Occupational; Safety • Social Services	28 July 1971 – 23 April 1973^{[Retained]} ^{[Res]}	People's Party for Freedom and Democracy
Kees Schelfhout	Kees Schelfhout (1918–1983)	State Secretary	Education and Sciences	• Primary; Education • Special; Education • Preschool	28 July 1971 – 11 May 1973^{[Retained]}	Catholic; People's Party
Roelof Kruisinga	Dr. Roelof Kruisinga (1922–2012)	State Secretary	Transport and Water Management	• Public; Infrastructure • Water; Management • Postal Service • Weather; Forecasting	28 July 1971 – 20 March 1973^{[Retained]} ^{[Res]}	Christian; Historical Union
	Werner Buck (1925–2010)	State Secretary	Housing and Spatial Planning	• Urban Planning • Spatial Planning	17 August 1971 – 11 May 1973^{[Retained]}	Catholic; People's Party
Henk Vonhoff	Henk Vonhoff (1931–2010)	State Secretary	Culture, Recreation and Social Work	• Social Services • Disability Policy • Youth Care • Nature • Culture • Art • Recreation • Sport	28 July 1971 – 23 April 1973^{[Retained]} ^{[Res]}	People's Party for Freedom and Democracy
Source: (in Dutch) Rijksoverheid

^{Resigned}
^{Retained from the previous cabinet}
^{Continued in the next cabinet}
^{Acting}
^{Appointment European Commissioner}
