= Molly Geertsema =

Dutch politician (1918–1991)

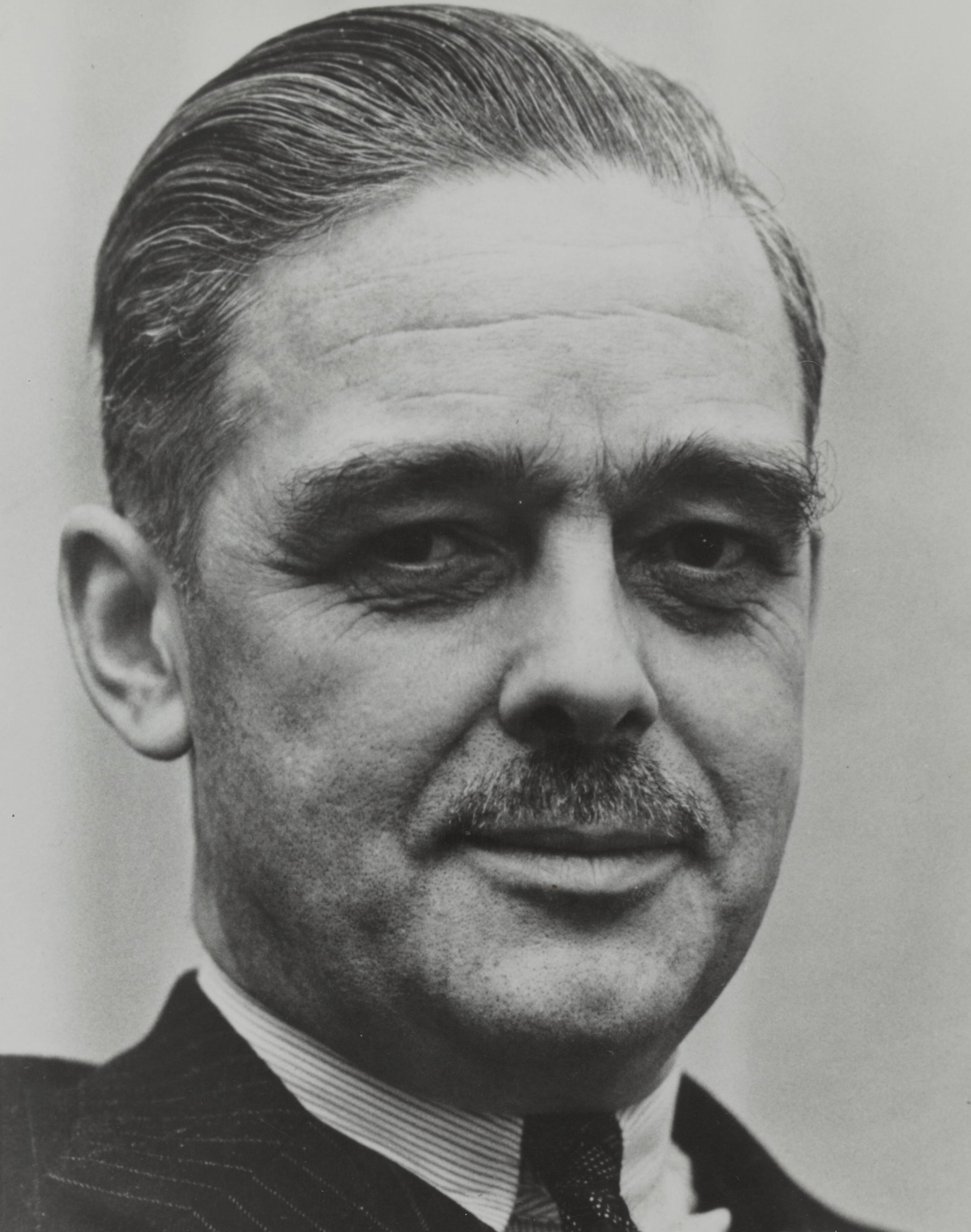
- Geertsema in 1971

Member of the Senate
- In office 13 September 1983 – 23 June 1987
- Parliamentary group: People's Party for Freedom and Democracy

Queen's Commissioner of Gelderland
- In office 1 December 1973 – 1 November 1983
- Monarchs: Juliana (1973–1980); Beatrix (1980–1983)
- Preceded by: Hugo Bloemers
- Succeeded by: Matty de Bruijne

Minister for Suriname and Netherlands Antilles Affairs
- In office 1 January 1973 – 11 May 1973
- Prime Minister: Barend Biesheuvel
- Preceded by: Pierre Lardinois
- Succeeded by: Gaius de Gaay Fortman

Deputy Prime Minister
- In office 6 July 1971 – 11 May 1973 Serving with Roelof Nelissen
- Prime Minister: Barend Biesheuvel
- Preceded by: Johan Witteveen; Joop Bakker
- Succeeded by: Dries van Agt

Minister of the Interior
- In office 6 July 1971 – 11 May 1973
- Prime Minister: Barend Biesheuvel
- Preceded by: Henk Beernink
- Succeeded by: Gaius de Gaay Fortman

Leader of the People's Party for Freedom and Democracy
- In office 1 October 1969 – 1 July 1971
- Deputy: Roelof Zegering Hadders
- Preceded by: Edzo Toxopeus
- Succeeded by: Hans Wiegel

Parliamentary leader in the House of Representatives
- In office 1 October 1969 – 6 July 1971
- Preceded by: Edzo Toxopeus
- Succeeded by: Hans Wiegel
- In office 24 July 1963 – 12 March 1966
- Preceded by: Edzo Toxopeus
- Succeeded by: Edzo Toxopeus
- Parliamentary group: People's Party for Freedom and Democracy

Mayor of Wassenaar
- In office 1 February 1961 – 10 April 1971
- Preceded by: Sweder van Wijnbergen
- Succeeded by: Karel Staab

Member of the House of Representatives
- In office 28 May 1973 – 9 November 1973
- In office 7 February 1973 – 5 May 1973
- In office 20 March 1959 – 6 July 1971
- Parliamentary group: People's Party for Freedom and Democracy

Mayor of Warffum
- In office 1 January 1953 – 1 January 1957
- Preceded by: Tekke Nabring
- Succeeded by: Simon de Waard

Personal details
- Born: Willem Jacob Geertsema II; 18 October 1918 Utrecht, Netherlands
- Died: 27 June 1991 (aged 72) Wassenaar, Netherlands
- Party: People's Party for Freedom and Democracy (from 1948)
- Other political affiliations: Freedom Party (1947–1948)
- Spouse: Adolfine Schoonenberg (m. 1947)
- Relations: Johan Herman Geertsema Czn. (great-grand father); Willem Jacob Geertsema (grand father)
- Children: Johan Herman Geertsema (1949–2000); Hero Omko Geertsema (1952–1952); Omko Oesebrand Geertsema (1953–2012); Alexander Cornelis Geertsema (born 1955)
- Education: Leiden University (Bachelor of Laws, Master of Laws)
- Occupation: Politician; civil servant; jurist; corporate director; nonprofit director; legal educator; author; lobbyist; activist

Willem Jacob "Molly" Geertsema II (Dutch: [ˈʋɪləm ˈjaːkɔp ˈmɔli ˈɣeːrtsəmaː də ˈtʋeːdə]; 18 October 1918 – 27 June 1991) was a Dutch politician of the People's Party for Freedom and Democracy (VVD) and jurist.

Geertsema attended a Gymnasium in The Hague from June 1930 until June 1937 and applied at the Leiden University in June 1937 majoring in Law and obtaining a Bachelor of Laws degree in June 1939. On 10 May 1940 Nazi Germany invaded the Netherlands and the government fled to London to escape the German occupation. During the German occupation Geertsema continued his study but in November 1940 the German occupation authority closed the Leiden University. Geertsema worked as a civil servant for the municipality of Oegstgeest from December 1940 until December 1944.

Following the end of World War II Geertsema returned to the Leiden University graduating with a Master of Laws degree in July 1947. Geertsema worked as legal educator in Leiden from August 1947 until December 1952. Geertsema served on the Municipal Council of Leiden from April 1950 until January 1953. In December 1952 Geertsema was nominated as Mayor of Warffum, taking office on 1 January 1953. In December 1956 Geertsema was appointment as Director-General of the department for Public Sector Organisations of the Ministry of the Interior, he resigned as Mayor the same day he was installed as Director-General on 1 January 1957.

Geertsema was elected as a Member of the House of Representatives after the election of 1959, taking office on 20 March 1959 serving as a frontbencher chairing the parliamentary committee for the Interior and the special parliamentary committee for Water Management in War Time and spokesperson for the Interior, Justice, Social Work, Provincial Government Affairs, Media, Kingdom Relations and deputy spokesperson for Civil Service and Local Government Affairs. In January 1961 Geertsema was nominated as Mayor of Wassenaar and dual served in those positions, taking office on 1 February 1961.

After the election of 1963 the Leader of the People's Party for Freedom and Democracy and Parliamentary leader of the People's Party for Freedom and Democracy in the House of Representatives Edzo Toxopeus opted to remain Minister of the Interior in the Cabinet Marijnen, the People's Party for Freedom and Democracy leadership approached Geertsema as his successor as Parliamentary leader, Geertsema accepted and became the Parliamentary leader in the House of Representatives, taking office on 24 July 1963.

The Cabinet Marijnen fell on 27 February 1965 after a disagreement in the coalition about reforms to the public broadcasting system and continued to serve in a demissionary capacity until the cabinet formation of 1965 when it was replaced by the Cabinet Cals on 14 April 1965. Toxopeus subsequently returned as a Member of the House of Representatives on 21 September 1965 but approached Geertsema to continue as Parliamentary leader.

Toxopeus returned as Parliamentary leader on 12 March 1966 and Geertsema continued to serve in the House of Representatives as frontbencher again chairing the parliamentary committee for the Interior and spokesperson for the Interior, Justice, Provincial Government Affairs, Media, Kingdom Relations and deputy spokesperson for Social Work and Local Government Affairs. In September 1969 Toxopeus unexpectedly announced he was stepping down as Leader and Parliamentary leader and endorsed Geertsema as his successor, the People's Party for Freedom and Democracy leadership subsequently approached Geertsema as his successor, Geertsema accepted and became the Leader and Parliamentary leader, taking office on 1 October 1969.

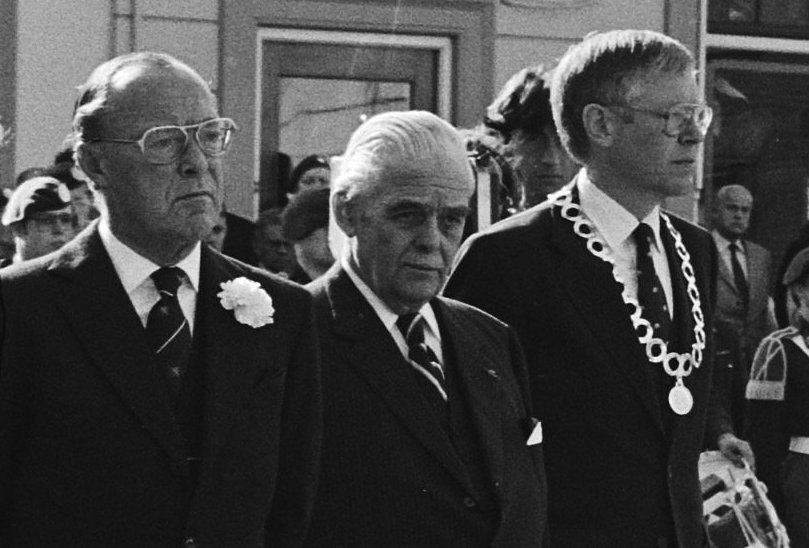
Prince Bernhard, Queen's Commissioner Molly Geertsema and Mayor of Wageningen Jan van Ketwich Verschuur during a World War II memorial in Wageningen on 5 May 1980.

For the election of 1971 Geertsema served as Lijsttrekker (top candidate). The People's Party for Freedom and Democracy suffered a small loss, losing 1 seat and now had 16 seats in the House of Representatives. In June 1971 Geertsema unexpectedly announced he was stepping down as Leader and Parliamentary leader. The following cabinet formation of 1971 resulted in a coalition agreement between the People's Party for Freedom and Democracy, the Catholic People's Party, the Anti-Revolutionary Party (ARP), the Christian Historical Union (CHU) and the Democratic Socialists '70 (DS'70) which formed the Cabinet Biesheuvel I with Geertsema appointed as Deputy Prime Minister and Minister of the Interior, taking office on 6 July 1971.

The Cabinet Biesheuvel I fell just one year later on 19 July 1972 after the Democratic Socialists '70 retracted their support following there dissatisfaction with the proposed budget memorandum to further reduce the deficit and continued to serve in a demissionary capacity until the first cabinet formation of 1972 when it was replaced by the caretaker Cabinet Biesheuvel II with Geertsema continuing as Deputy Prime Minister and Minister of the Interior, taking office on 9 August 1972. Geertsema was appointed as Minister for Suriname and Netherlands Antilles Affairs following the appointment of Pierre Lardinois as the next European Commissioner, taking office on 1 January 1973.

After the election of 1981 Geertsema returned as a Member of the House of Representatives, taking office on 7 February 1973 but he was still serving in the cabinet and because of dualism customs in the constitutional convention of Dutch politics he couldn't serve a dual mandate he subsequently resigned as a Member of the House of Representatives on 5 May 1973. The Cabinet Biesheuvel II was replaced by the Cabinet Den Uyl following the second cabinet formation of 1972 on 11 May 1973. Geertsema subsequently returned as a Member of the House of Representatives, taking office on 28 May 1973 serving again as a frontbencher and spokesperson for the Interior, Local Government Affairs, Provincial Government Affairs and Kingdom Relations.

In November 1973 Geertsema was nominated as the next Queen's Commissioner of Gelderland, he resigned as Member of the House of Representatives on 9 November 1973 and was installed as Queen's Commissioner, serving from 1 December 1973 until 1 November 1983. Geertsema also became active in the private sector and public sector and occupied numerous seats as a corporate director and nonprofit director on several boards of directors and supervisory boards (Heineken N.V., DSM Company, Rotterdam Dry Dock Company, NIBC Bank, Atlantic Association, SHV Holdings and Campina) and served on several state commissions and councils on behalf of the government (Public Pension Funds PFZW, Custodial Institutions Agency, Advisory Council for Spatial Planning, Raad voor Cultuur and KPN) and as an advocate, lobbyist and activist for LGBT rights and Social justice.

Geertsema was elected as a Member of the Senate after the Senate election of 1983, taking office on 13 September 1983 serving as a frontbencher chairing the parliamentary committee for the Interior and the parliamentary committee for Kingdom Relations and spokesperson for the Interior, Local Government Affairs, Provincial Government Affairs, Civil Service and Kingdom Relations.

In January 1987 Geertsema announced his retirement from national politics and that he wouldn't stand for the Senate election of 1987 and continued to serve until the end of the parliamentary term on 23 June 1987. Geertsema retired after spending 28 years in national politics but remained active in the private sector and public sector and continued to occupy numerous seats as a corporate director and nonprofit director on several boards of directors and supervisory boards. Geertsema was also a prolific author, having written more than a dozen books and articles since 1972 about Politics and LGBT rights.

Geertsema was known for his abilities as a manager and policy wonk. Geertsema continued to comment on political affairs until his death at the age of 72.

== Decorations ==
Honours
| Ribbon bar | Honour | Country | Date | Comment |
|---|---|---|---|---|
| | Grand Officer of the Order of Leopold II | Belgium | 16 August 1972 | |
| | Commander of the Order of the Netherlands Lion | Netherlands | 8 June 1973 | Elevated from Knight (10 December 1970) |
| | Commander of the Legion of Honour | France | 1 October 1973 | |
| | Grand Officer of the Order of Orange-Nassau | Netherlands | 10 November 1983 | Elevated from Officer (10 June 1978) |

Awards
| Ribbon bar | Awards | Organization | Date | Comment |
|---|---|---|---|---|
| | Honorary Member | People's Party for Freedom and Democracy | 14 March 1975 | |

Party political offices
| Preceded by Edzo Toxopeus | Parliamentary leader of the People's Party for Freedom and Democracy in the House of Representatives; 1963–1966; 1969–1971 | Succeeded by Edzo Toxopeus |
| Preceded by Edzo Toxopeus | Parliamentary leader of the People's Party for Freedom and Democracy in the House of Representatives; 1963–1966; 1969–1971 | Succeeded by Hans Wiegel |
| Preceded by Edzo Toxopeus | Leader of the People's Party for Freedom and Democracy; 1969–1971 | Succeeded by Hans Wiegel |
| Preceded by Edzo Toxopeus; 1967 | Lijsttrekker of the People's Party for Freedom and Democracy; 1971 | Succeeded by Hans Wiegel; 1972 |
Political offices
| Preceded by Tekke Nabring | Mayor of Warffum; 1953–1957 | Succeeded by Simon de Waard |
| Preceded by Sweder van Wijnbergen | Mayor of Wassenaar; 1961–1971 | Succeeded by Karel Staab |
| Preceded by Johan Witteveen | Deputy Prime Minister; 1971–1973; Served alongside: Roelof Nelissen | Succeeded by Dries van Agt |
| Preceded by Joop Bakker | Deputy Prime Minister; 1971–1973; Served alongside: Roelof Nelissen | Succeeded by Dries van Agt |
| Preceded by Henk Beernink | Minister of the Interior; 1971–1973 | Succeeded by Gaius de Gaay Fortman |
| Preceded by Pierre Lardinois | Minister for Suriname and Netherlands Antilles Affairs; 1973 | Succeeded by Gaius de Gaay Fortman |
| Preceded by Hugo Bloemers | Queen's Commissioner of Gelderland; 1973–1983 | Succeeded by Matty de Bruijne |
Civic offices
| Unknown | Director-General of the Department for Public; Sector Organisations of the Ministry of the Interior; 1957–1959 | Unknown |
