= List of ministers of kingdom relations of the Netherlands =

State Secretary for Kingdom Relations and Effective Government of the Netherlands
- Staatssecretaris Koninkrijksrelaties en Slagvaardige Overheid
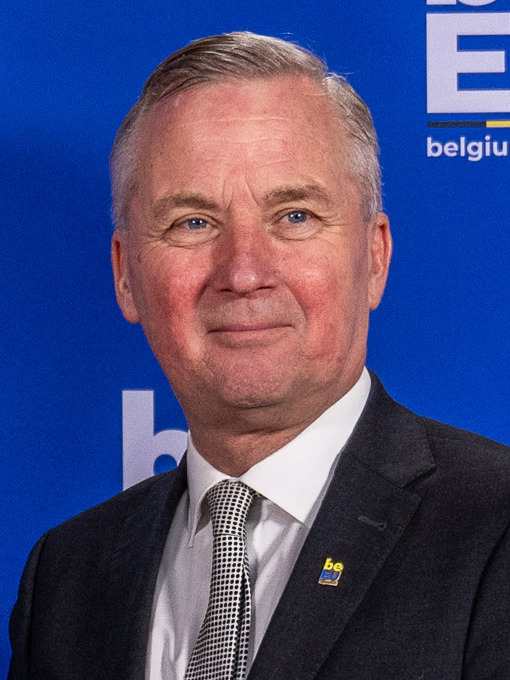
- Incumbent; Eric van der Burg since 23 February 2026; 6 months ago
- Ministry of the Interior and Kingdom Relations
- Style: His/Her Excellency
- Reports to: Minister of the Interior and Kingdom Relations
- Appointer: The monarch on advice of the prime minister
- First holder: Paulus van der Heim as Minister of Trade and Colonies; 1 August 1806; 220 years ago
- Salary: €192,413 (As of 2025)

The Netherlands has long appointed ministers to oversee relations with the other territories of the Kingdom of the Netherlands and, historically, the administration of its colonies. From 1959 to 1998, responsibility for kingdom relations was assigned to a cabinet member in addition to their primary ministerial role. In 1998, this portfolio was formally placed under the minister of the Interior, though in practice it is often delegated to a minister without portfolio or state secretary within the Ministry of the Interior and Kingdom Relations. Eric van der Burg has held this position since 23 February 2026, serving as state secretary for Kingdom Relations and Effective Government. (Note: Dutch: staatssecretaris Koninkrijksrelaties en Slagvaardige Overheid; Papiamentu: sekretario di estado pa Relashonnan den Reino i Gobièrnu Desisivo.)

== List of ministers of kingdom relations ==
Cabinet	Minister			Term of office		Title
Cabinet	Image	Name	Party	Start	End	Title
Van Zuylen van Nijevelt	Pieter Mijer	Pieter Mijer	Independent	1 June 1866	17 September 1866	Minister of Colonies
Van Zuylen van Nijevelt	Nicolaas Trakranen	Nicolaas Trakranen	Independent	17 September 1866	20 July 1867	Minister of Colonies
Van Zuylen van Nijevelt	Johannes Hasselman	Johannes Hasselman	Independent	20 July 1867	4 June 1868	Minister of Colonies
Van Bosse–Fock	Engelbertus de Waal	Engelbertus de Waal	Independent	4 June 1868	16 November 1870	Minister of Colonies
Van Bosse–Fock	Lodewijk Gerard Brocx	Lodewijk Gerard Brocx (ad interim)	Independent	16 November 1870	4 January 1871	Minister of Colonies
Thorbecke III	Pieter Philip van Bosse	Pieter Philip van Bosse	Independent	4 January 1871	6 July 1872	Minister of Colonies
De Vries–Fransen van de Putte	Isaäc Dignus Fransen van de Putte	Isaäc Dignus Fransen van de Putte	Independent	6 July 1872	27 August 1874	Minister of Colonies
Heemskerk–Van Lynden van Sandenburg	Willem van Goltstein van Oldenaller	Willem van Goltstein van Oldenaller	Independent	27 August 1874	11 September 1876	Minister of Colonies
Heemskerk–Van Lynden van Sandenburg	Fokko Alting Mees	Fokko Alting Mees	Independent	11 September 1876	3 November 1877	Minister of Colonies
Kappeyne van de Coppello	Pieter Philip van Bosse	Pieter Philip van Bosse	Independent	3 November 1877	21 February 1879	Minister of Colonies
Kappeyne van de Coppello	Hendrikus Wichers	Hendrikus Wichers (ad interim)	Independent	21 February 1879	12 March 1879	Minister of Colonies
Kappeyne van de Coppello	Otto van Rees	Otto van Rees	Independent	12 March 1879	20 August 1879	Minister of Colonies
Van Lynden van Sandenburg	Willem van Goltstein van Oldenaller	Willem van Goltstein van Oldenaller	Independent	20 August 1879	1 September 1882	Minister of Colonies
Van Lynden van Sandenburg	Willem Maurits de Brauw	Willem Maurits de Brauw	Independent	1 September 1882	23 February 1883	Minister of Colonies
Van Lynden van Sandenburg	Willem van Erp Taalman Kip	Willem van Erp Taalman Kip (ad interim)	Independent	23 February 1883	23 April 1883	Minister of Colonies
Jan Heemskerk		Gerard van Bloemen Waanders	Independent	23 April 1883	25 November 1883	Minister of Colonies
Jan Heemskerk	August Willem Philip Weitzel	August Willem Philip Weitzel (ad interim)	Independent	25 November 1883	27 February 1884	Minister of Colonies
Jan Heemskerk	Jacobus Sprenger van Eyk	Jacobus Sprenger van Eyk	Independent	27 February 1884	21 April 1888	Minister of Colonies
Mackay	Levinus Keuchenius	Levinus Keuchenius	ARP	21 April 1888	24 February 1890	Minister of Colonies
Mackay	Aeneas Mackay	Æneas Mackay	ARP	24 February 1890	21 August 1891	Minister of Colonies
Van Tienhoven	Willem van Dedem	Willem Karel van Dedem	LU	21 August 1891	9 May 1894	Minister of Colonies
Röell	Jacob Bergsma	Jacob Bergsma	Independent	9 May 1894	27 July 1897	Minister of Colonies
Pierson	Jacob Theodoor Cremer	Jacob Theodoor Cremer	LU	27 July 1897	1 August 1901	Minister of Colonies
Kuyper	Titus van Asch van Wijck	Titus van Asch van Wijck	ARP	1 August 1901	9 September 1902	Minister of Colonies
Kuyper	Johannes Bergansius	Johannes Bergansius (ad interim)	Independent	9 September 1902	25 September 1902	Minister of Colonies
Kuyper	Alexander Idenburg	Alexander Idenburg	ARP	25 September 1902	17 August 1905	Minister of Colonies
De Meester	Dirk Fock	Dirk Fock	LU	17 August 1905	12 February 1908	Minister of Colonies
Theo Heemskerk	Theo Heemskerk	Theo Heemskerk (ad interim)	ARP	12 February 1908	20 May 1908	Minister of Colonies
Theo Heemskerk	Alexander Idenburg	Alexander Idenburg	ARP	20 May 1908	16 August 1909	Minister of Colonies
Theo Heemskerk	Jan Hendrik de Waal Malefijt	Jan Hendrik de Waal Malefijt	ARP	16 August 1909	29 August 1913	Minister of Colonies
Cort van der Linden	Thomas Bastiaan Pleyte	Thomas Bastiaan Pleyte	VDB	29 August 1913	8 December 1915	Minister of Colonies
Cort van der Linden	Jean Jacques Rambonnet	Jean Jacques Rambonnet (acting)	Independent	8 December 1915	17 January 1916	Minister of Colonies
Cort van der Linden	Thomas Bastiaan Pleyte	Thomas Bastiaan Pleyte	VDB	17 January 1916	9 September 1918	Minister of Colonies
Ruijs de Beerenbrouck I	Alexander Idenburg	Alexander Idenburg	ARP	9 September 1918	13 November 1919	Minister of Colonies
Ruijs de Beerenbrouck I	Charles Ruijs de Beerenbrouck	Charles Ruijs de Beerenbrouck (ad interim)	RKSP	13 November 1919	13 November 1919	Minister of Colonies
Ruijs de Beerenbrouck II	Simon de Graaff	Simon de Graaff	Independent	13 November 1919	4 August 1925	Minister of Colonies
Colijn I	Hendrikus Colijn	Hendrikus Colijn	ARP	4 August 1925	1 October 1925	Minister of Colonies
Colijn I	Charles Welter	Charles Welter	RKSP	1 October 1925	8 March 1926	Minister of Colonies
De Geer I	Jacob Koningsberger	Jacob Koningsberger	Independent	8 March 1926	10 August 1929	Minister of Colonies
Ruijs de Beerenbrouck III	Simon de Graaff	Simon de Graaff	Independent	10 August 1929	26 May 1933	Minister of Colonies
Colijn II	Hendrikus Colijn	Hendrikus Colijn	ARP	26 May 1933	24 June 1937	Minister of Colonies
Colijn III	Hendrikus Colijn	Hendrikus Colijn	ARP	26 May 1933	24 June 1937	Minister of Colonies
Colijn IV	Charles Welter	Charles Welter	RKSP	24 June 1937	25 July 1939	Minister of Colonies
Colijn V	Cornelis van den Bussche	Cornelis van den Bussche	Independent	25 July 1939	10 August 1939	Minister of Colonies
De Geer II	Charles Welter	Charles Welter	RKSP	10 August 1939	17 November 1941	Minister of Colonies
Gerbrandy I	Charles Welter	Charles Welter	RKSP	10 August 1939	17 November 1941	Minister of Colonies
Gerbrandy II	Charles Welter	Charles Welter	RKSP	10 August 1939	17 November 1941	Minister of Colonies
Gerbrandy II	Pieter Sjoerds Gerbrandy	Pieter Sjoerds Gerbrandy (ad interim)	ARP	17 November 1941	21 May 1942	Minister of Colonies
Gerbrandy II	Huib van Mook	Huib van Mook	Independent	21 May 1942	23 February 1945	Minister of Colonies
Gerbrandy III	Josef Schmutzer	Josef Schmutzer	RKSP	23 February 1945	25 June 1945	Minister of Colonies
Schermerhorn–Drees	Johann Logemann	Johann Logemann	SDAP	25 June 1945	3 July 1946	Minister of Overseas Territories
Beel I	Jan Jonkman	Jan Jonkman	PvdA	3 July 1946	30 August 1947	Minister of Overseas Territories
Beel I	Louis Beel	Louis Beel (acting)	KVP	30 August 1947	3 November 1947	Minister of Overseas Territories
Beel I	Jan Jonkman	Jan Jonkman	PvdA	3 November 1947	7 August 1948	Minister of Overseas Territories
Drees–Van Schaik	Maan Sassen	Maan Sassen	KVP	7 August 1948	14 February 1949	Minister of Overseas Territories
Drees–Van Schaik	Johan van Maarseveen	Johan van Maarseveen	KVP	14 February 1949	15 March 1951	Minister of Overseas Territories
Drees I	Willem Drees	Willem Drees (ad interim)	PvdA	15 March 1951	30 March 1951	Minister of Union Affairs and Overseas Territories
Drees I	Leo Peters	Leo Peters	KVP	30 March 1951	2 September 1952	Minister of Union Affairs and Overseas Territories
Drees II	Willem Kernkamp	Willem Kernkamp	CHU	2 September 1952	18 July 1956	Minister of Union Affairs and Overseas Territories
Drees II	Willem Kernkamp	Willem Kernkamp	CHU	2 September 1952	18 July 1956	Minister of Overseas Territories
Drees II	Kees Staf	Kees Staf (ad interim)	CHU	18 July 1956	13 October 1956	Minister of Overseas Territories
Drees III	Kees Staf	Kees Staf (ad interim)	CHU	13 October 1956	14 February 1957	Minister of Overseas Affairs
Drees III	Gerard Helders	Gerard Helders	CHU	14 February 1957	19 May 1959	Minister of Overseas Affairs
Beel II	Gerard Helders	Gerard Helders	CHU	14 February 1957	19 May 1959	Minister of Overseas Affairs
De Quay	Henk Korthals	Henk Korthals	VVD	19 May 1959	24 July 1963	Deputy Prime Minister
Marijnen	Barend Biesheuvel	Barend Biesheuvel	ARP	24 July 1963	5 April 1967	Deputy Prime Minister
Cals	Barend Biesheuvel	Barend Biesheuvel	ARP	24 July 1963	5 April 1967	Deputy Prime Minister
Zijlstra	Barend Biesheuvel	Barend Biesheuvel	ARP	24 July 1963	5 April 1967	Deputy Prime Minister
De Jong	Joop Bakker	Joop Bakker	ARP	5 April 1967	6 July 1971	Deputy Prime Minister
Biesheuvel I	Roelof Nelissen	Roelof Nelissen	KVP	6 July 1971	1 February 1972	Deputy Prime Minister
Biesheuvel II	Pierre Lardinois	Pierre Lardinois	KVP	1 February 1972	1 January 1973	Minister for Surinamese and Netherlands Antillean Affairs
Biesheuvel II	Molly Geertsema	Molly Geertsema	VVD	1 January 1973	11 May 1973	Minister for Surinamese and Netherlands Antillean Affairs
Den Uyl	Gaius de Gaay Fortman	Gaius de Gaay Fortman	ARP	11 May 1973	19 December 1977	Minister for Netherlands Antillean Affairs
Van Agt I	Fons van der Stee	Fons van der Stee	KVP	19 December 1977	11 September 1981	Minister for Netherlands Antillean Affairs
Van Agt II	Joop den Uyl	Joop den Uyl	PvdA	11 September 1981	29 May 1982	Minister for Netherlands Antillean Affairs
Van Agt III	Jan de Koning	Jan de Koning	CDA	29 May 1982	14 July 1986	Minister for Netherlands Antillean Affairs
Lubbers I	Jan de Koning	Jan de Koning	CDA	29 May 1982	14 July 1986	Minister for Netherlands Antillean Affairs
Lubbers II	Jan de Koning	Jan de Koning	CDA	14 July 1986	7 November 1989	Minister for Netherlands Antillean and Aruban Affairs
Lubbers III	Ruud Lubbers	Ruud Lubbers (ad interim)	CDA	7 November 1989	14 November 1989	Minister for Netherlands Antillean and Aruban Affairs
Lubbers III	Ernst Hirsch Ballin	Ernst Hirsch Ballin	CDA	14 November 1989	27 May 1994	Minister for Netherlands Antillean and Aruban Affairs
Lubbers III	Ruud Lubbers	Ruud Lubbers (ad interim)	CDA	27 May 1994	22 August 1994	Minister for Netherlands Antillean and Aruban Affairs
Kok I	Joris Voorhoeve	Joris Voorhoeve	VVD	22 August 1994	3 August 1998	Minister for Netherlands Antillean and Aruban Affairs
Kok II	Bram Peper	Bram Peper	PvdA	3 August 1998	13 March 2000	Minister of the Interior and Kingdom Relations (Note: Responsibility for kingdom relations was delegated to a minister without portfolio or state secretary.)
Kok II	Roger van Boxtel	Roger van Boxtel (ad interim)	D66	13 March 2000	24 March 2000	Minister of the Interior and Kingdom Relations
Kok II	Klaas de Vries	Klaas de Vries	PvdA	24 March 2000	22 July 2002	Minister of the Interior and Kingdom Relations
Balkenende I	Johan Remkes	Johan Remkes	VVD	22 July 2002	27 May 2003	Minister of the Interior and Kingdom Relations
Balkenende II	Johan Remkes	Johan Remkes	VVD	27 May 2003	22 February 2007	Minister of the Interior and Kingdom Relations
Balkenende III	Johan Remkes	Johan Remkes	VVD	27 May 2003	22 February 2007	Minister of the Interior and Kingdom Relations
Balkenende IV	Guusje ter Horst	Guusje ter Horst	PvdA	22 February 2007	23 February 2010	Minister of the Interior and Kingdom Relations
Balkenende IV	Ernst Hirsch Ballin	Ernst Hirsch Ballin	CDA	23 February 2010	14 October 2010	Minister of the Interior and Kingdom Relations
Rutte I	Piet Hein Donner	Piet Hein Donner	CDA	14 October 2010	16 December 2011	Minister of the Interior and Kingdom Relations
Rutte I	Liesbeth Spies	Liesbeth Spies	CDA	16 December 2011	5 November 2012	Minister of the Interior and Kingdom Relations
Rutte II	Ronald Plasterk	Ronald Plasterk	PvdA	5 November 2012	29 June 2016	Minister of the Interior and Kingdom Relations
Rutte II	Stef Blok	Stef Blok (acting)	VVD	29 June 2016	16 September 2016	Minister of the Interior and Kingdom Relations
Rutte II	Ronald Plasterk	Ronald Plasterk	PvdA	16 September 2016	26 October 2017	Minister of the Interior and Kingdom Relations
Rutte III	Kajsa Ollongren	Kajsa Ollongren	D66	26 October 2017	1 November 2019	Minister of the Interior and Kingdom Relations
Rutte III	Raymond Knops	Raymond Knops (acting)	CDA	1 November 2019	14 April 2020	Minister of the Interior and Kingdom Relations
Rutte III	Kajsa Ollongren	Kajsa Ollongren	D66	14 April 2020	10 January 2022	Minister of the Interior and Kingdom Relations
Rutte IV	Hanke Bruins Slot	Hanke Bruins Slot	CDA	10 January 2022	5 September 2023	Minister of the Interior and Kingdom Relations
Rutte IV	Hugo de Jonge	Hugo de Jonge	CDA	5 September 2023	2 July 2024	Minister of the Interior and Kingdom Relations
Schoof		Judith Uitermark	NSC	2 July 2024	22 August 2025	Minister of the Interior and Kingdom Relations
Schoof	David van Weel	David van Weel (ad interim)	VVD	22 August 2025	5 September 2025	Minister of the Interior and Kingdom Relations
Schoof		Frank Rijkaart	BBB	5 September 2025	23 February 2026	Minister of the Interior and Kingdom Relations
Jetten	Pieter Heerma	Pieter Heerma	CDA	23 February 2026	Incumbent	Minister of the Interior and Kingdom Relations

== List of ministers without portfolio ==
Cabinet	Minister			Term of office		Title	Ministry
Cabinet	Image	Name	Party	Start	End	Title	Ministry
Gerbrandy II	Adipati Soejono	Adipati Soejono	Independent	9 June 1942	5 January 1943	Minister without portfolio	Colonies
Beel I	Lubbertus Götzen	Lubbertus Götzen	Independent	11 November 1947	15 March 1951	Minister without portfolio (Note: Charged with financial and economic affairs of the overseas territories.)	Overseas Territories
Drees–Van Schaik	Lubbertus Götzen	Lubbertus Götzen	Independent	11 November 1947	15 March 1951	Minister without portfolio	Overseas Territories
Balkenende II	Thom de Graaf	Thom de Graaf	D66	27 May 2003	23 March 2005	Minister for Government Reform and Kingdom Relations	Interior and Kingdom Relations
Balkenende II	Alexander Pechtold	Alexander Pechtold	D66	31 March 2005	3 July 2006	Minister for Government Reform and Kingdom Relations	Interior and Kingdom Relations
Balkenende III	Atzo Nicolaï	Atzo Nicolaï	VVD	7 July 2006	22 February 2007	Minister for Government Reform and Kingdom Relations	Interior and Kingdom Relations

== List of state secretaries for kingdom relations ==
Cabinet	Minister			Term of office		Title	Ministry
Cabinet	Image	Name	Party	Start	End	Title	Ministry
Drees I	Lubbertus Götzen	Lubbertus Götzen	Independent	15 March 1951	2 September 1952	State Secretary for Union Affairs and Overseas Territories	Union Affairs and Overseas Territories
De Quay	Theo Bot	Theo Bot	KVP	23 November 1959	24 July 1963	State Secretary for the Interior	Interior
Kok II		Gijs de Vries	VVD	3 August 1998	22 July 2002	State Secretary for the Interior and Kingdom Relations	Interior and Kingdom Relations
Balkenende IV	Ank Bijleveld	Ank Bijleveld	CDA	22 February 2007	14 October 2010	State Secretary for the Interior and Kingdom Relations	Interior and Kingdom Relations
Rutte III	Raymond Knops	Raymond Knops	CDA	26 October 2017	1 November 2019	State Secretary for the Interior and Kingdom Relations	Interior and Kingdom Relations
Rutte III	Raymond Knops	Raymond Knops	CDA	14 April 2020	10 January 2022	State Secretary for the Interior and Kingdom Relations	Interior and Kingdom Relations
Rutte IV	Alexandra van Huffelen	Alexandra van Huffelen	D66	10 January 2022	2 July 2024	State Secretary for Kingdom Relations and Digitalisation	Interior and Kingdom Relations
Schoof	Zsolt Szabó	Zsolt Szabó	PVV	2 July 2024	3 June 2025	State Secretary for Digitalisation and Kingdom Relations	Interior and Kingdom Relations
Schoof		Eddie van Marum	BBB	19 June 2025	23 February 2026	State Secretary for Digitalisation, Kingdom Relations and Reparations for Groningen	Interior and Kingdom Relations
Jetten		Eric van der Burg	VVD	23 February 2026	Incumbent	State Secretary for Kingdom Relations and Effective Government	Interior and Kingdom Relations
