= Roelof Nelissen =

Dutch politician (1931–2019)

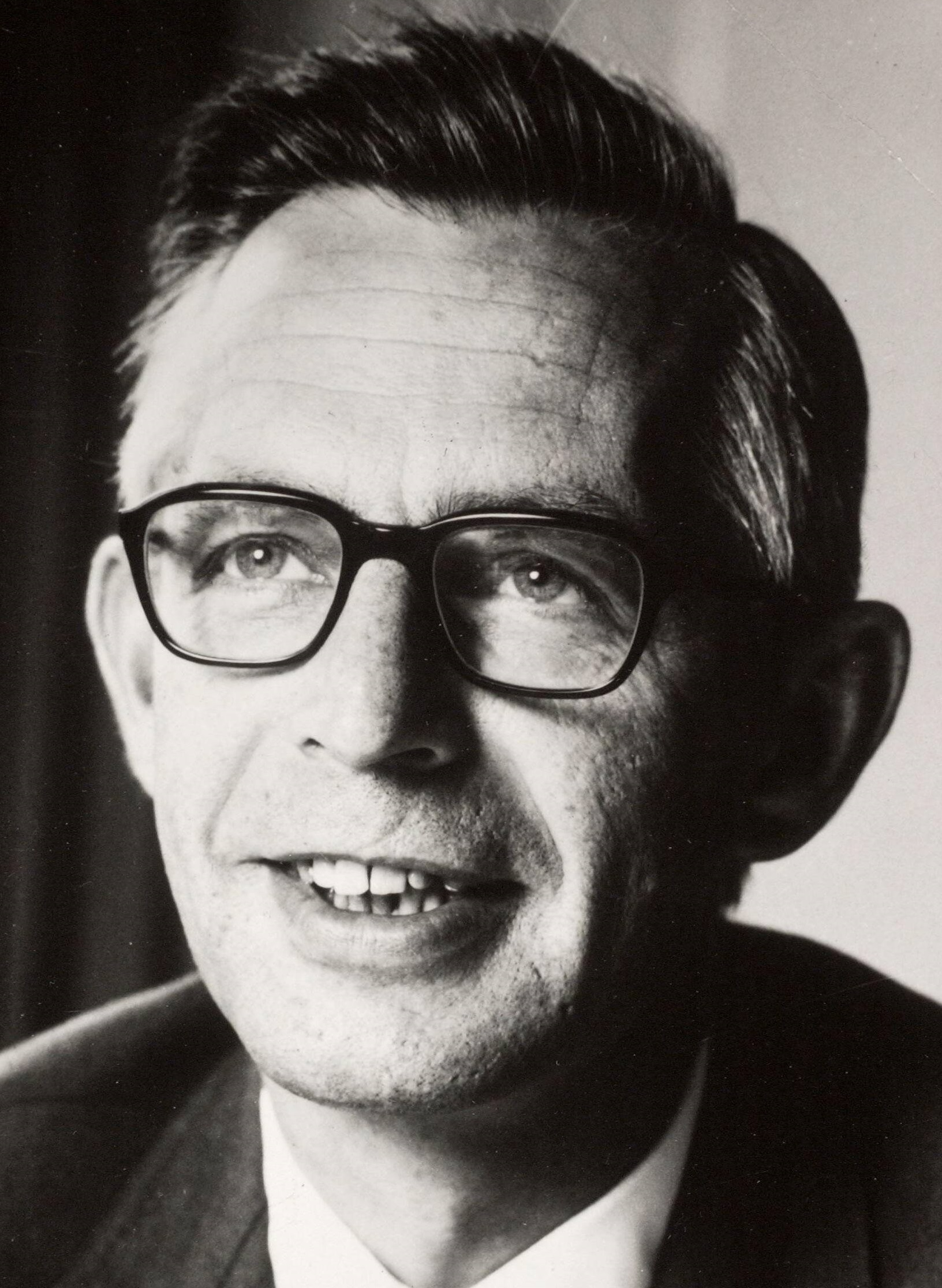
- Nelissen in 1973

Deputy Prime Minister
- In office 6 July 1971 – 11 May 1973 Serving with Molly Geertsema
- Prime Minister: Barend Biesheuvel
- Preceded by: Johan Witteveen; Joop Bakker
- Succeeded by: Dries van Agt

Minister of Finance
- In office 6 July 1971 – 11 May 1973
- Prime Minister: Barend Biesheuvel
- Preceded by: Johan Witteveen
- Succeeded by: Wim Duisenberg

Minister for Suriname and Netherlands Antilles Affairs
- In office 6 July 1971 – 28 January 1972
- Prime Minister: Barend Biesheuvel
- Preceded by: Joop Bakker
- Succeeded by: Pierre Lardinois

Minister of Economic Affairs
- In office 14 January 1970 – 6 July 1971
- Prime Minister: Piet de Jong
- Preceded by: Johan Witteveen (Ad interim)
- Succeeded by: Harrie Langman

Member of the House of Representatives
- In office 7 December 1972 – 7 March 1973
- In office 11 May 1971 – 6 July 1971
- In office 5 June 1963 – 14 January 1970
- Parliamentary group: Catholic People's Party

Personal details
- Born: Roelof Johannes Nelissen; 4 April 1931 Hoofdplaat, Netherlands
- Died: 18 July 2019 (aged 88) Hilversum, Netherlands
- Party: Christian Democratic Appeal (from 1980)
- Other political affiliations: Catholic People's Party (until 1980)
- Spouse: Annemarie van der Kelen (m. 1957; died 2018)
- Education: Radboud University Nijmegen (Bachelor of Laws, Master of Laws)
- Occupation: Politician · Jurist · Economist · Businessman · Banker · Financial adviser · Corporate director · Nonprofit director · Trade association executive · Lobbyist

Military service
- Allegiance: Netherlands
- Branch/service: Royal Netherlands Army
- Years of service: 1955–1956 (Conscription); 1956–1961 (Reserve)
- Rank: Sergeant
- Unit: Medical Corps
- Battles/wars: Cold War

Roelof Johannes Nelissen (4 April 1931 – 18 July 2019) was a Dutch politician of the defunct Catholic People's Party (KVP) now merged into the Christian Democratic Appeal (CDA) party and businessman.

== Biography ==
Nelissen attended a Gymnasium in Dongen from April 1943 until May 1949 and applied at the Radboud University Nijmegen in June 1950 majoring in Tax law obtaining a Bachelor of Laws degree in June 1952 before graduating with a Master of Laws degree in July 1956. Nelissen was conscripted in the Medical Corps of the Royal Netherlands Army serving as a Sergeant from September 1956 until October 1957. Nelissen worked as a trade association executive for the Catholic Business association from December 1956 until September 1968 and served as Deputy General-Secretary of the executive board from December 1956 until June 1962 and General-Secretary of the executive board from June 1962 until September 1968.

Nelissen was elected as a Member of the House of Representatives after the election of 1963, taking office on 5 June 1963 serving as a frontbencher chairing the special parliamentary committee for Right of Inquiries for Companies and spokesperson for Finances, Housing and Spatial Planning, Small business and deputy spokesperson for Economic Affairs. Nelissen was appointed Minister of Economic Affairs in the Cabinet De Jong following the resignation of Leo de Block, taking office on 14 January 1970. After the election of 1971 Nelissen returned as a Member of the House of Representatives, taking office on 11 May 1971. Following the cabinet formation of 1971 Nelissen was appointed Deputy Prime Minister, Minister of Finance and Minister for Suriname and Netherlands Antilles Affairs in the Cabinet Biesheuvel I, taking office on 6 July 1971. On 28 January 1972 Nelissen resigned as Minister for Suriname and Netherlands Antilles Affairs following the appointment of Minister of Agriculture and Fisheries Pierre Lardinois. The Cabinet Biesheuvel I fell just one year later on 19 July 1972 following the withdrawal of the Democratic Socialists '70 (DS'70) because of their dissatisfaction with the proposed budget memorandum to further reduce the deficit and continued to serve in a demissionary capacity until the first cabinet formation of 1972 when it was replaced by the caretaker Cabinet Biesheuvel II with Nelissen continuing as Deputy Prime Minister and Minister of Finance, taking office on 9 August 1972. After the election of 1972 Nelissen again returned as a Member of the House of Representatives, taking office on 7 December 1972 but he was still serving in the cabinet and because of dualism customs in the constitutional convention of Dutch politics he couldn't serve a dual mandate. He subsequently resigned as a Member of the House of Representatives on 7 March 1973. Following the second cabinet formation of 1972 Nelissen was not given a cabinet post in the new cabinet, the Cabinet Biesheuvel II was replaced by the Cabinet Den Uyl on 11 May 1973.

Nelissen retired from national politics and became active in the private sector. In September 1973 he was named as a financial adviser for the AMRO Bank, in September 1979 he was named as chief financial officer (CFO) and vice chairman of the board of directors for the AMRO Bank, in April 1983 he was appointed chief executive officer CEO and chairman of the board of directors for the AMRO Bank. In 1991 the AMRO Bank and the General Bank of the Netherlands (ABN) chose to merge to form the ABN AMRO with Nelissen appointed CEO and chairman of the board of directors from April 1991 until December 1992.

== Decorations ==
Honours
Ribbon bar	Honour	Country	Date
	Knight of the Order of the Holy Sepulchre	Holy See	15 August 1971
	Commander of the Order of Orange-Nassau	Netherlands	8 June 1973
	Grand Officer of the Honorary Order of the Palm	Suriname	25 April 1978
	Grand Officer of the Order of the Crown	Belgium	15 May 1984

Political offices
Preceded by Johan Witteveen; Ad interim	Minister of Economic Affairs; 1970–1971	Succeeded by Harrie Langman
Preceded by Johan Witteveen	Deputy Prime Minister; 1971–1973; Served alongside: Molly Geertsema	Succeeded by Dries van Agt
Preceded by Joop Bakker	Deputy Prime Minister; 1971–1973; Served alongside: Molly Geertsema	Succeeded by Dries van Agt
Preceded by Johan Witteveen	Minister of Finance; 1971–1973	Succeeded by Wim Duisenberg
Preceded by Joop Bakker	Minister for Suriname and Netherlands Antilles Affairs; 1971–1972	Succeeded by Pierre Lardinois
Business positions
Unknown	CFO and Vice Chairman of the board of directors of the AMRO Bank; 1979–1983	Unknown
Preceded by Jan van den Brink	CEO and Chairman of the Board of directors of the AMRO Bank; 1983–1991	Succeeded by Office discontinued
Preceded by Office established	CEO and Chairman of the Board of directors of ABN AMRO; 1991–1992	Succeeded by Rob Hazelhoff
