= Harrie Langman =

Dutch politician (1931–2016)

His Excellency Harrie Langman
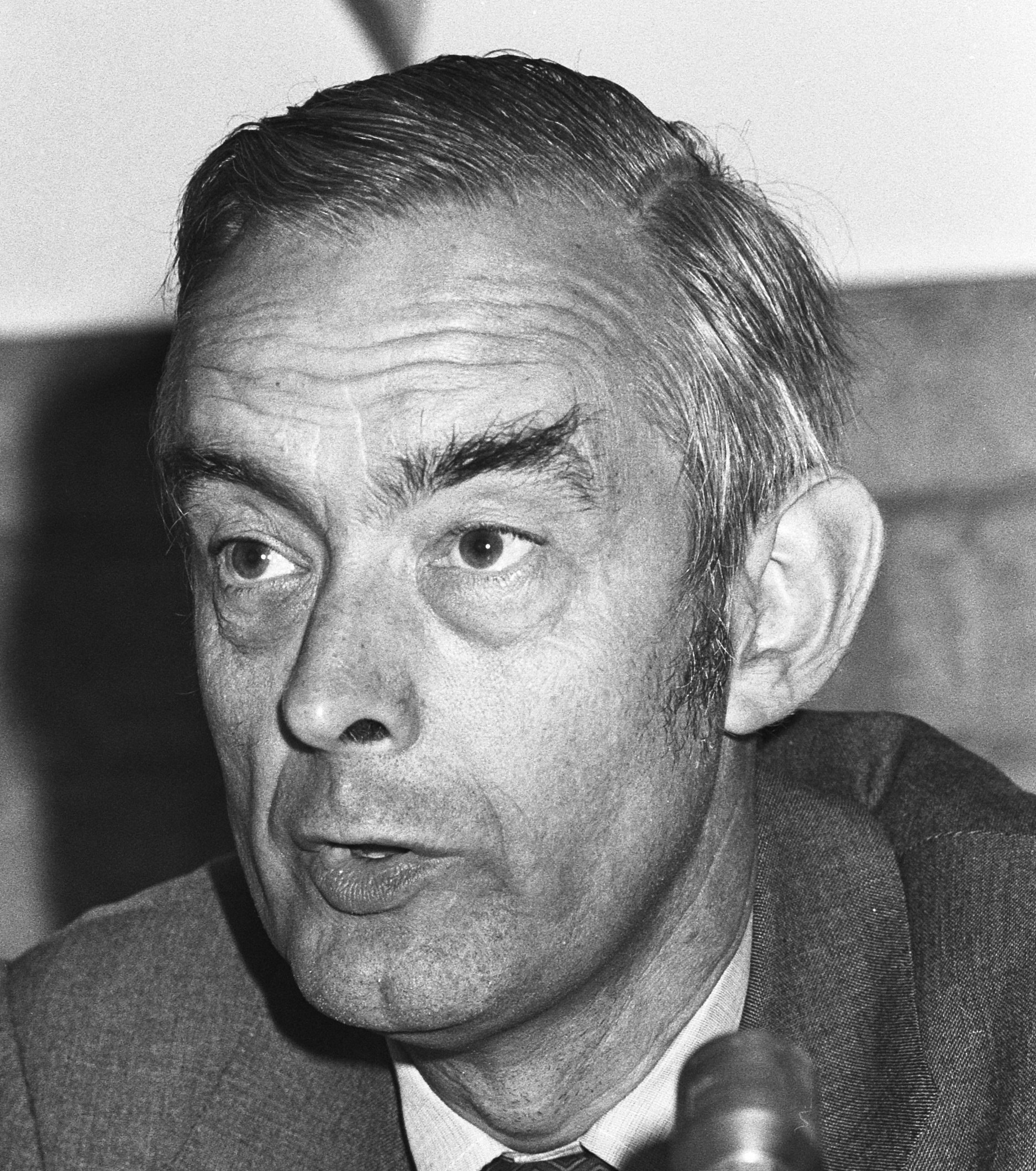
- Harrie Langman in 1982

Minister of Economic Affairs
- In office 6 July 1971 – 11 May 1973
- Prime Minister: Barend Biesheuvel
- Preceded by: Roelof Nelissen
- Succeeded by: Ruud Lubbers

Personal details
- Born: 23 February 1931 Akkrum, Netherlands
- Died: 1 August 2016 (aged 85) Drachten, Netherlands
- Party: People's Party for Freedom and Democracy (from 1971)
- Spouse: Aukje Bouma (m. 1956; died 2001)
- Domestic partner(s): Bobs Vos-van Waasbergen (2008–2016)
- Children: Roelof Langman; Jet Langman; Michiel Langman; Martien Langman
- Education: Vrije Universiteit Amsterdam
- Occupation: Politician; economist; banker; businessman; corporate director; professor

Military service
- Allegiance: The Netherlands
- Branch/service: Royal Netherlands Army
- Years of service: 1953–1955
- Rank: Private
- Battles/wars: Cold War

Hartgert "Harrie" Langman (23 February 1931 – 1 August 2016) was a Dutch politician of the People's Party for Freedom and Democracy (VVD).

== Life and career ==
Langman studied law and economics at the Vrije Universiteit Amsterdam. He served as Minister of Economic Affairs from 1971-1973. After his political career he was on the Executive Board of N.V. ABN until 1991, and was also a professor at the Netherlands School of Economics.

Langman died on 1 August 2016.
