= Barend Biesheuvel =

Prime Minister of the Netherlands from 1971 to 1973

His Excellency Barend Biesheuvel
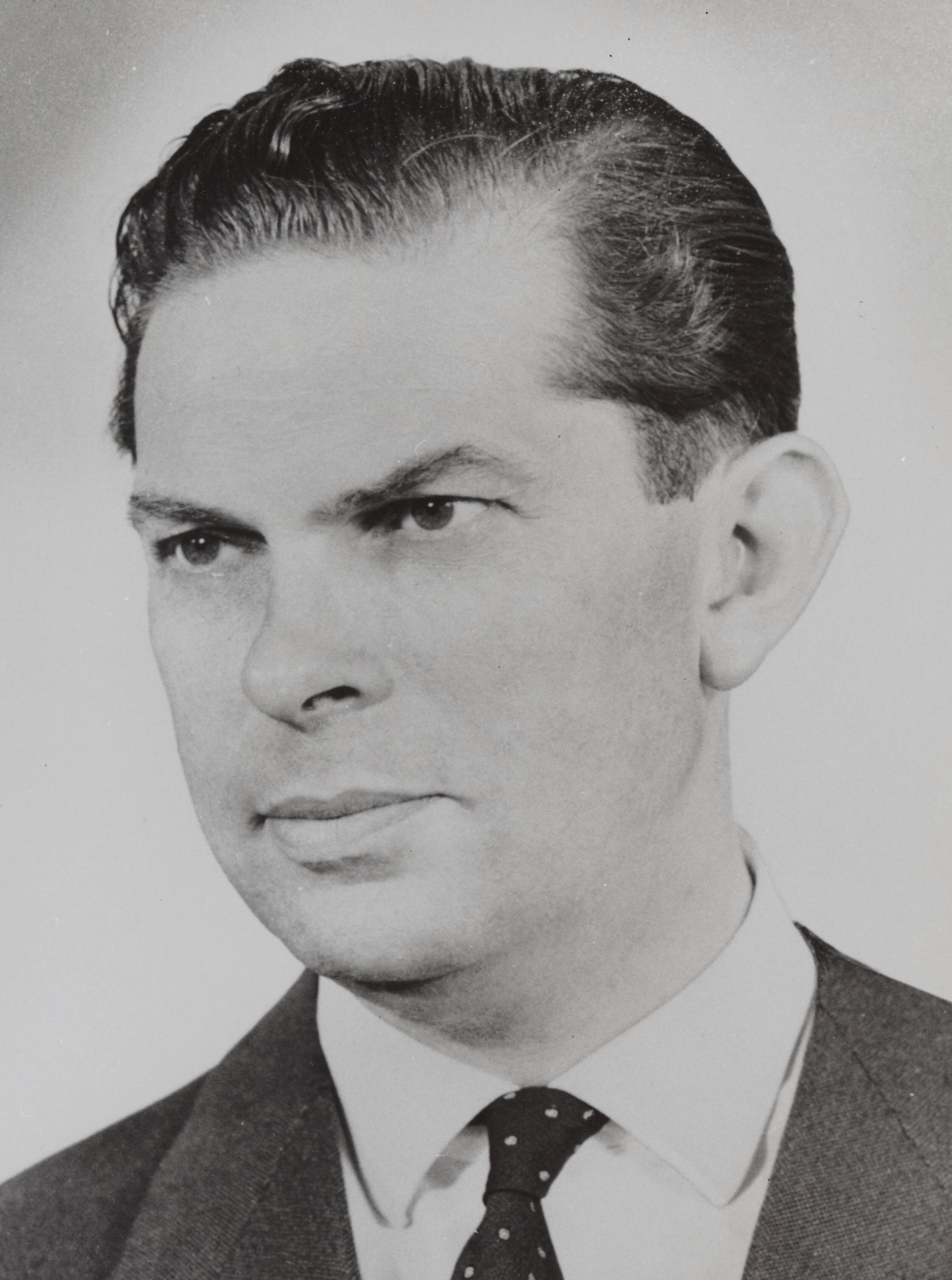
- Biesheuvel in 1963

Prime Minister of the Netherlands
- In office 6 July 1971 – 11 May 1973
- Monarch: Juliana
- Deputy: Roelof Nelissen; Molly Geertsema
- Preceded by: Piet de Jong
- Succeeded by: Joop den Uyl

Deputy Prime Minister
- In office 24 July 1963 – 5 April 1967 Serving with Anne Vondeling (1965–1966); Jan de Quay (1966–1967)
- Prime Minister: See list: Victor Marijnen (1963–1965) Jo Cals (1965–1966) Jelle Zijlstra (1966–1967)
- Preceded by: Henk Korthals
- Succeeded by: Johan Witteveen; Joop Bakker

Minister of Agriculture and Fisheries
- In office 24 July 1963 – 5 April 1967
- Prime Minister: See list: Victor Marijnen (1963–1965) Jo Cals (1965–1966) Jelle Zijlstra (1966–1967)
- Preceded by: Victor Marijnen
- Succeeded by: Pierre Lardinois

Minister for Suriname and Netherlands Antilles Affairs
- In office 24 July 1963 – 5 April 1967
- Prime Minister: See list: Victor Marijnen (1963–1965) Jo Cals (1965–1966) Jelle Zijlstra (1966–1967)
- Preceded by: Henk Korthals
- Succeeded by: Joop Bakker

Parliamentary leader in the House of Representatives
- In office 7 December 1972 – 7 March 1973
- Preceded by: Willem Aantjes
- Succeeded by: Willem Aantjes
- In office 23 February 1967 – 6 July 1971
- Preceded by: Bauke Roolvink
- Succeeded by: Willem Aantjes
- In office 5 June 1963 – 24 July 1963
- Preceded by: Henk van Eijsden
- Succeeded by: Jan Smallenbroek
- Parliamentary group: Anti-Revolutionary Party

Leader of the Anti-Revolutionary Party
- In office 5 June 1963 – 15 May 1973
- Preceded by: Sieuwert Bruins Slot
- Succeeded by: Willem Aantjes

Member of the European Parliament
- In office 7 March 1961 – 24 July 1963
- Parliamentary group: Christian Democratic Group

Member of the House of Representatives
- In office 7 December 1972 – 7 March 1973
- In office 23 February 1967 – 6 July 1971
- In office 6 November 1956 – 24 July 1963

Member of the Social and Economic Council
- In office 20 March 1956 – 1 July 1959
- Chairman: Frans de Vries (1956–1958); Gerard Verrijn Stuart (1958–1959)

Personal details
- Born: Barend Willem Biesheuvel; 5 April 1920 Haarlemmerliede, Netherlands
- Died: 29 April 2001 (aged 81) Haarlem, Netherlands
- Party: Christian Democratic Appeal (from 1980)
- Other political affiliations: Anti-Revolutionary Party (until 1980)
- Education: Vrije Universiteit Amsterdam (LL.B., LL.M.)
- Occupation: Politician · civil servant · Jurist · Businessperson · Banker · Corporate director · Nonprofit director · Trade association executive · Lobbyist

Barend Willem Biesheuvel (5 April 1920 – 29 April 2001) was a Dutch politician of the Anti-Revolutionary Party (ARP) and jurist who served as Prime Minister of the Netherlands from 6 July 1971 until 11 May 1973.

Biesheuvel studied law at the Vrije Universiteit Amsterdam obtaining a Master of Laws degree and worked as a civil servant for the provincial executive of North Holland from September 1945 until January 1952 and as trade association executive for the Christian Farmers and Gardeners Association (CBTB) from January 1952 until July 1959 and as chairman from August 1956. Biesheuvel became a member of the House of Representatives shortly after the number of seats was raised from 100 to 150 seats following the 1956 general election, taking office on 6 November 1956. He served as a frontbencher and spokesperson for agriculture, local government affairs and Kingdom relations. Biesheuvel was also selected as a Member of the European Parliament, taking office on 7 March 1961. After party leader Sieuwert Bruins Slot announced his retirement Biesheuvel served as one of the lead candidates for the 1963 general election, and following the election, he was selected as party leader and parliamentary leader on 5 June 1963. Following a cabinet formation, Biesheuvel was appointed as Deputy Prime Minister and Minister of Agriculture and Fisheries with the responsibility for Suriname and Netherlands Antilles Affairs in the Marijnen cabinet taking office on 24 July 1963. The cabinet fell on 27 February 1965 and was replaced by the Cals cabinet, with Biesheuvel continuing his offices. This cabinet in turn fell on 14 October 1966 and was replaced by the caretaker Zijlstra cabinet, with Biesheuvel again retaining his functions. For the 1967 general election Biesheuvel served as lead candidate, but following a difficult cabinet formation failed to achieve a coalition and returned to the House of Representatives as parliamentary leader taking office on 23 February 1967. For the 1971 general election, Biesheuvel again served as lead candidate, and after a successful cabinet formation formed the Biesheuvel I cabinet, becoming Prime Minister of the Netherlands on 6 July 1971.

The first Biesheuvel cabinet fell on 19 July 1972 just a year into its term and was replaced by the caretaker Biesheuvel II cabinet, with Biesheuvel continuing as Prime Minister. For the 1972 general election, Biesheuvel served once again as lead candidate, but the following cabinet formation resulted in a coalition led by Joop den Uyl, Leader of the Labour Party. Biesheuvel left office upon the installation of the Den Uyl cabinet on 11 May 1973 and announced his retirement, stepping down as party leader on 15 May 1973.

Biesheuvel retired from active politics at just 53 and became active in the private and public sectors as a corporate and non-profit director and served on several state commissions and councils on behalf of the government, and continued to be active as a lobbyist for the European Union advocating for more European integration. Biesheuvel was known for his abilities as skilful manager and effective Debater. During his premiership, his cabinets were responsible for several major public sector reforms by stimulating further deregulation and endorsing more privatization. Biesheuvel continued to comment on political affairs as a statesman until his death at the age of 81 from cardiovascular disease. He holds the distinction as leading the last cabinet in which the prime minister was not from the largest party in the coalition, and his premiership is consistently considered both by scholars and the public to have been below average.

== Early life ==
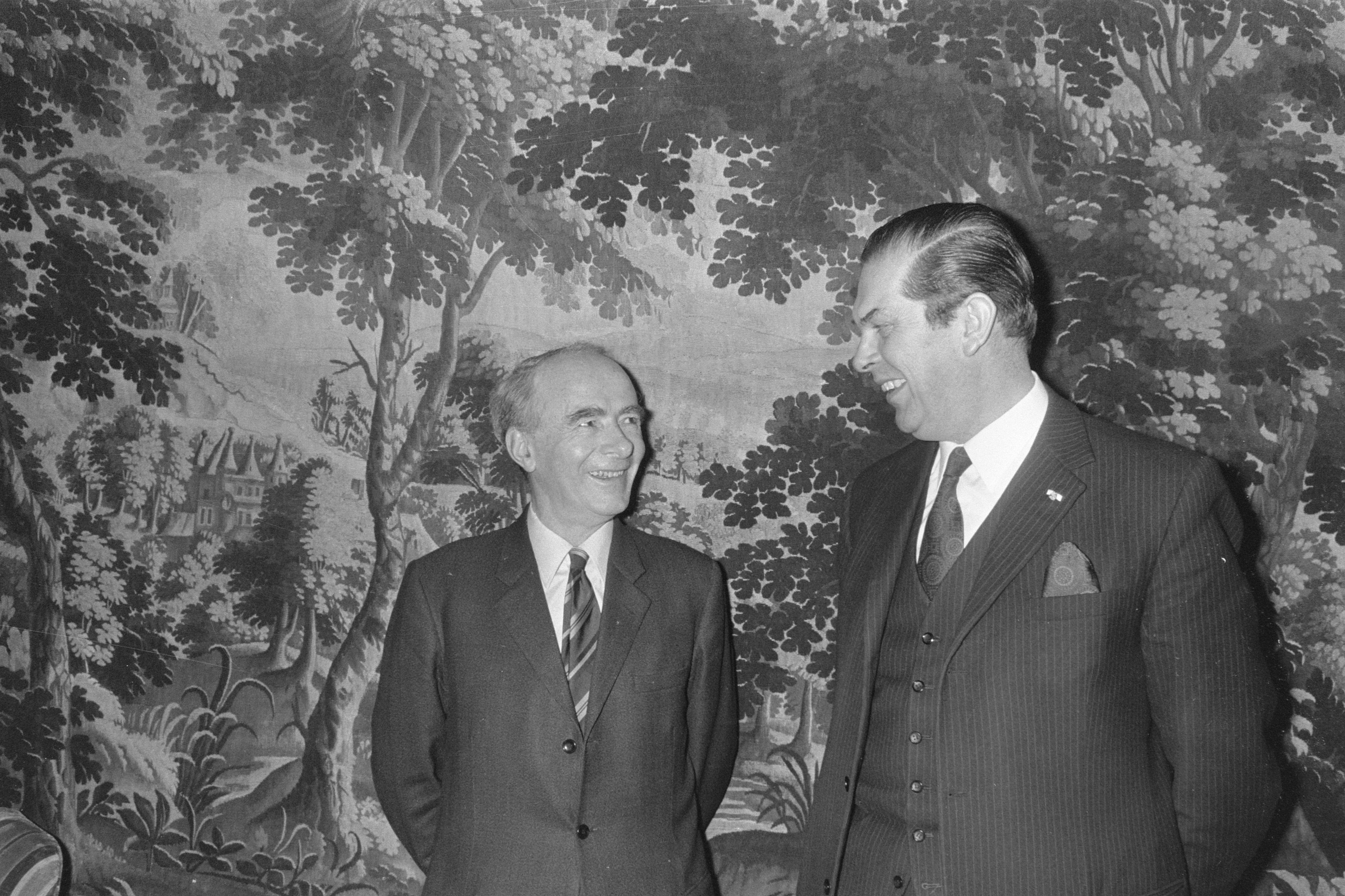
Prime Minister of Norway Trygve Bratteli and Prime Minister Barend Biesheuvel at the Catshuis on 8 January 1972

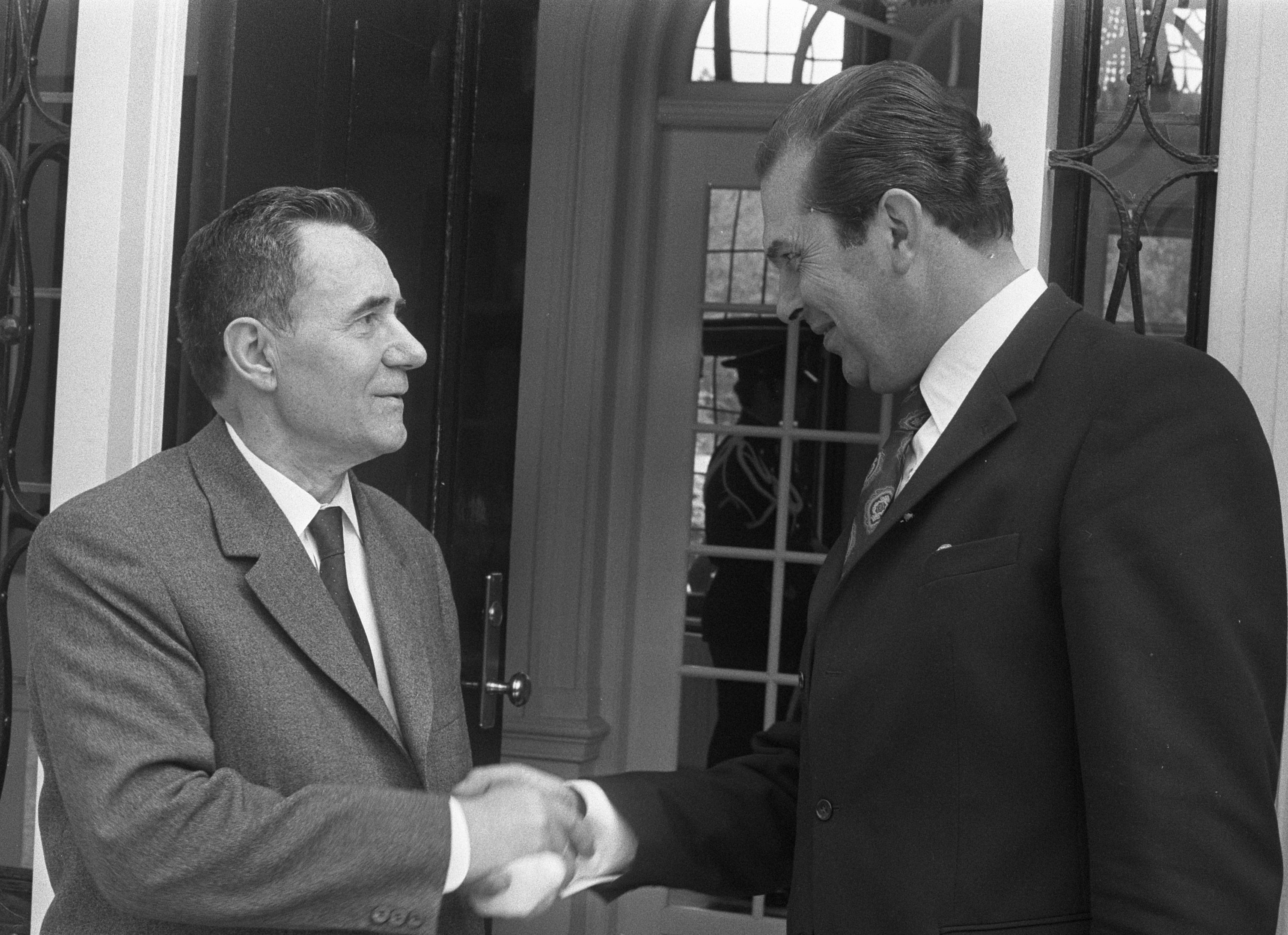
Minister of Foreign Affairs of the Soviet Union Andrei Gromyko and Prime Minister Barend Biesheuvel at the Catshuis op 5 July 1972

Barend Willem Biesheuvel was born on 5 April 1920 in Haarlemmerliede in the Province of North Holland in a Reformed family, the son of Arie Biesheuvel (born 21 January 1883 in Haarlemmerliede – died 21 May 1952 in Haarlemmerliede) and Johanna Margaretha "Antje" Troost (born 22 February 1881 in Sloten – died 12 December 1955 in Fijnaart). Biesheuvel had three brothers and two sisters. After completing his secondary education at local schools, he graduated in law at the Free University of Amsterdam in September 1945. For the next two years Biesheuvel worked in Alkmaar as secretary to the Food Commissioner for the Province of North Holland. In 1947 he became secretary to the Foreign Division of the Agricultural Society (now the Agricultural Board). In 1952 Biesheuvel became general secretary of the Christian Farmers and Gardeners Association of the Netherlands (CBTB) and in 1959 chairman of that organisation. From the same year he was also a member of the Agricultural Board, the Labour Foundation and the boards of the Centrale Raifeissen Bank and Heidemij.

== Politics ==
Between 1956 and 1963 he represented the Anti-Revolutionary Party in the House of Representatives (the lower house of parliament). From 1957 to 1961 he held a seat on the Consultative Assembly of the Council of Europe and from 1961 to 1963 in the European Parliament.

In the successive administrations headed by Marijnen, Cals and Zijlstra between 24 July 1963 and 5 April 1967 he was Deputy Prime Minister with additional responsibility for matters concerning Suriname and the Netherlands Antilles, and Minister of Agriculture and Fisheries.

In 1967 he returned to the House of Representatives and became leader of the parliamentary Anti-Revolutionary Party. During the same period he also chaired the Shipbuilding Board and the Committee on Government Information Reform.

From 1971 to 1973 Biesheuvel was prime minister of the Netherlands.

== After politics ==
Following his political career, Biesheuvel went on to occupy many other positions in the public and private sectors. Among other things, he was chairman of the supervisory board of the National Investment Bank, a member of the supervisory boards of OGEM and KLM, and chaired the working party on the Netherlands Antilles, the national advisory committee on the relationship between the electorate and policy-making, the Provisional Council for Transport, Public Works and Water Management and the Interministerial Coordinating Committee on North Sea Affairs (ICONA).

== Personal life ==
On 22 November 1945, Biesheuvel married his longtime partner, Wilhelmina Jacoba "Mies" Meuring (born 7 August 1919). They had two daughters and one son. Mies Meuring died on 17 January 1989, at the age of 69. Barend Biesheuvel died in a hospital in Haarlem from cardiovascular disease on 29 April 2001, at the age of 81. Biesheuvel and his wife were buried at the main cemetery in Bloemendaal.

== Decorations ==
Honours
Ribbon bar	Honour	Country	Date	Comment
	Commander of the Order of the Netherlands Lion	Netherlands	8 June 1973	
	Knight Grand Cross of the Order of Orange-Nassau	Netherlands	21 March 1991	Elevated from Grand Officer (27 April 1967)

Party political offices
Preceded by Jelle Zijlstra; 1959	Lead candidate of the Anti-Revolutionary Party; 1963, 1967, 1971, 1972; With: Jan Smallenbroek (1963); Bauke Roolvink (1963)	Party merged into Christian Democratic Appeal
Preceded by Sieuwert Bruins Slot	Leader of the Anti-Revolutionary Party; 1963–1973	Succeeded by Willem Aantjes
Preceded by Henk van Eijsden	Parliamentary leader of the Anti-Revolutionary Party in the House of Representatives; 1963; 1967–1971; 1972–1973	Succeeded by Jan Smallenbroek
Preceded by Bauke Roolvink	Parliamentary leader of the Anti-Revolutionary Party in the House of Representatives; 1963; 1967–1971; 1972–1973	Succeeded by Willem Aantjes
Preceded by Willem Aantjes	Parliamentary leader of the Anti-Revolutionary Party in the House of Representatives; 1963; 1967–1971; 1972–1973	Succeeded by Willem Aantjes
Political offices
Preceded by Henk Korthals	Deputy Prime Minister; 1963–1967; With: Anne Vondeling (1965–1966); Jan de Quay (1966–1967)	Succeeded by Johan Witteveen
Preceded by Henk Korthals	Deputy Prime Minister; 1963–1967; With: Anne Vondeling (1965–1966); Jan de Quay (1966–1967)	Succeeded by Joop Bakker
Preceded by Henk Korthals	Minister for Suriname and Netherlands Antilles Affairs; 1963–1967	Succeeded by Joop Bakker
Preceded by Victor Marijnen	Minister of Agriculture and Fisheries; 1963–1967	Succeeded by Pierre Lardinois
Preceded by Piet de Jong	Prime Minister of the Netherlands; Minister of General Affairs; 1971–1973	Succeeded by Joop den Uyl
