= First Biesheuvel cabinet =

Dutch cabinet, 1971 to 1972

- Cabinet of the Netherlands

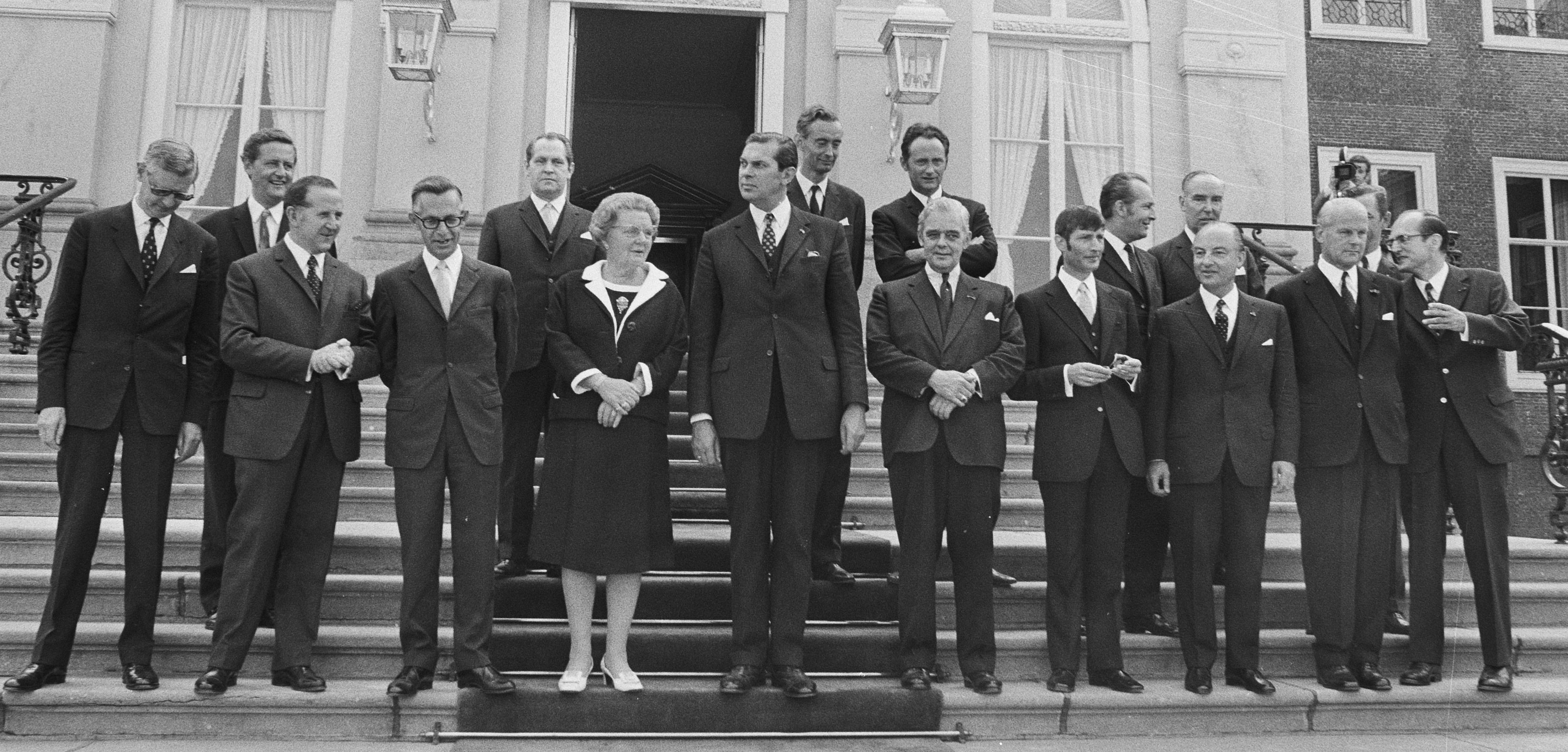
- The installation of the First Biesheuvel cabinet on 6 July 1971
- Date formed: 6 July 1971
- Date dissolved: 9 August 1972; 1 year, 34 days in office (Demissionary from 19 July 1972)

People and organisations
- Monarch: Queen Juliana
- Prime Minister: Barend Biesheuvel
- Deputy Prime Minister: Roelof Nelissen; Molly Geertsema
- No. of ministers: 16
- Ministers removed: 2
- Total no. of members: 16
- Member party: Catholic People's Party (KVP); People's Party for Freedom and Democracy (VVD); Anti-Revolutionary Party (ARP); Christian Historical Union (CHU); Democratic Socialists '70 (DS'70)
- Status in legislature: Centrist; Majority government

History
- Incoming formation: 1971 formation
- Outgoing formation: 1972–1973 formation
- Election: 1971 election
- Outgoing election: 1972 election
- Legislature terms: 1971–1972
- Predecessor: De Jong cabinet
- Successor: Second Biesheuvel cabinet

The first Biesheuvel cabinet was the executive branch of the Dutch Government from 6 July 1971 until 9 August 1972. The cabinet comprised members of three christian-democratic parties – the Catholic People's Party (KVP), the Anti-Revolutionary Party (ARP) and the Christian Historical Union (CHU); a conservative-liberal party – the People's Party for Freedom and Democracy (VVD); and a social-democratic party, the Democratic Socialists '70 (DS'70); and was formed after the election of 1971. The cabinet was the core of a centrist coalition that had a slim majority in the House of Representatives, with Leader of the ARP Barend Biesheuvel, a former Minister of Agriculture, serving as Prime Minister. Prominent KVP politician Roelof Nelissen the Minister of Economic Affairs in the previous De Jong cabinet, served as a Deputy Prime Minister and the Minister of Finance, and was given the portfolio of Suriname and Netherlands Antilles Affairs; former Leader of the VVD Molly Geertsema served as the other Deputy Prime Minister and Minister of the Interior.

The cabinet served in the early years of the radical 1970s. Domestically it had to deal with the peak of the counterculture and growing inflation, but it was able to implement several social reforms to the public sector and to stimulate deregulation and privatization. The cabinet suffered several major internal conflicts between its DS'70 members and the other members, which led to the fall of the cabinet just one year into its term on 19 July 1972, with the DS'70 members resigning two days later. The cabinet continued in a demissionary capacity until it was replaced on 9 August 1972 by the Second Biesheuvel cabinet in a caretaker role.

== Term ==
Problems facing the cabinet were the mooted release of remaining imprisoned Nazi German war criminals (the Breda Three) and increasing inflation, combined with a stagnating economy (stagflation). The decision to cut government expenses was not supported by DS'70, so the cabinet lost its majority in the parliament, eventually resulting in a second Biesheuvel cabinet.

Minister Stuyt, the first minister for environmental affairs, issued an urgency-note concerning the environment. In 1972, the first report from the Club of Rome was published, which showed that the environment is in a bad state worldwide and that resources will eventually run out.

In foreign affairs, the cabinet recognised the German Democratic Republic and voted in favour of the People’s Republic of China replacing the Republic of China at the United Nations.

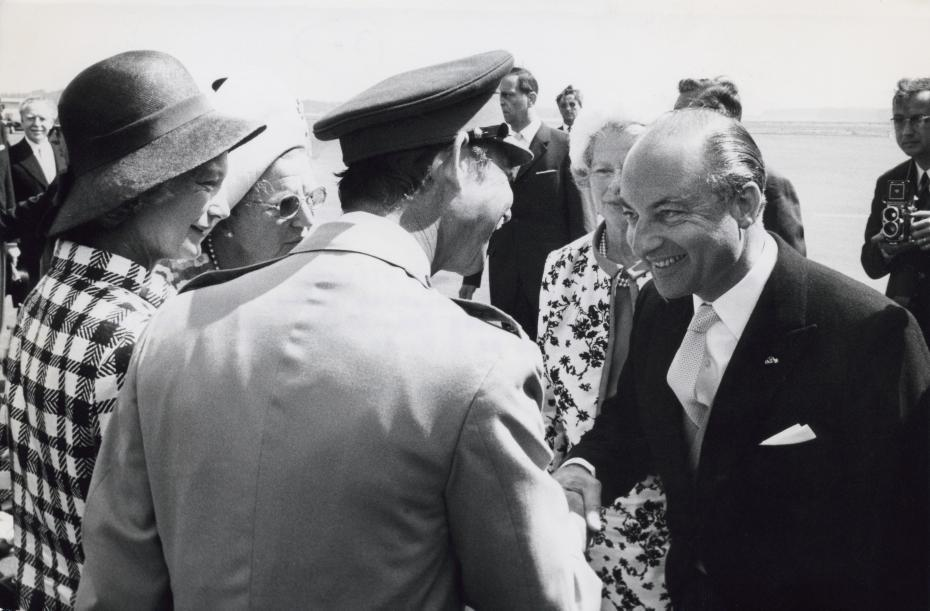
Princess Joséphine Charlotte of Belgium, Queen Juliana, Grand Duke Jean of Luxembourg and Minister of Foreign Affairs Norbert Schmelzer at Luxembourg Airport on 7 July 1971.

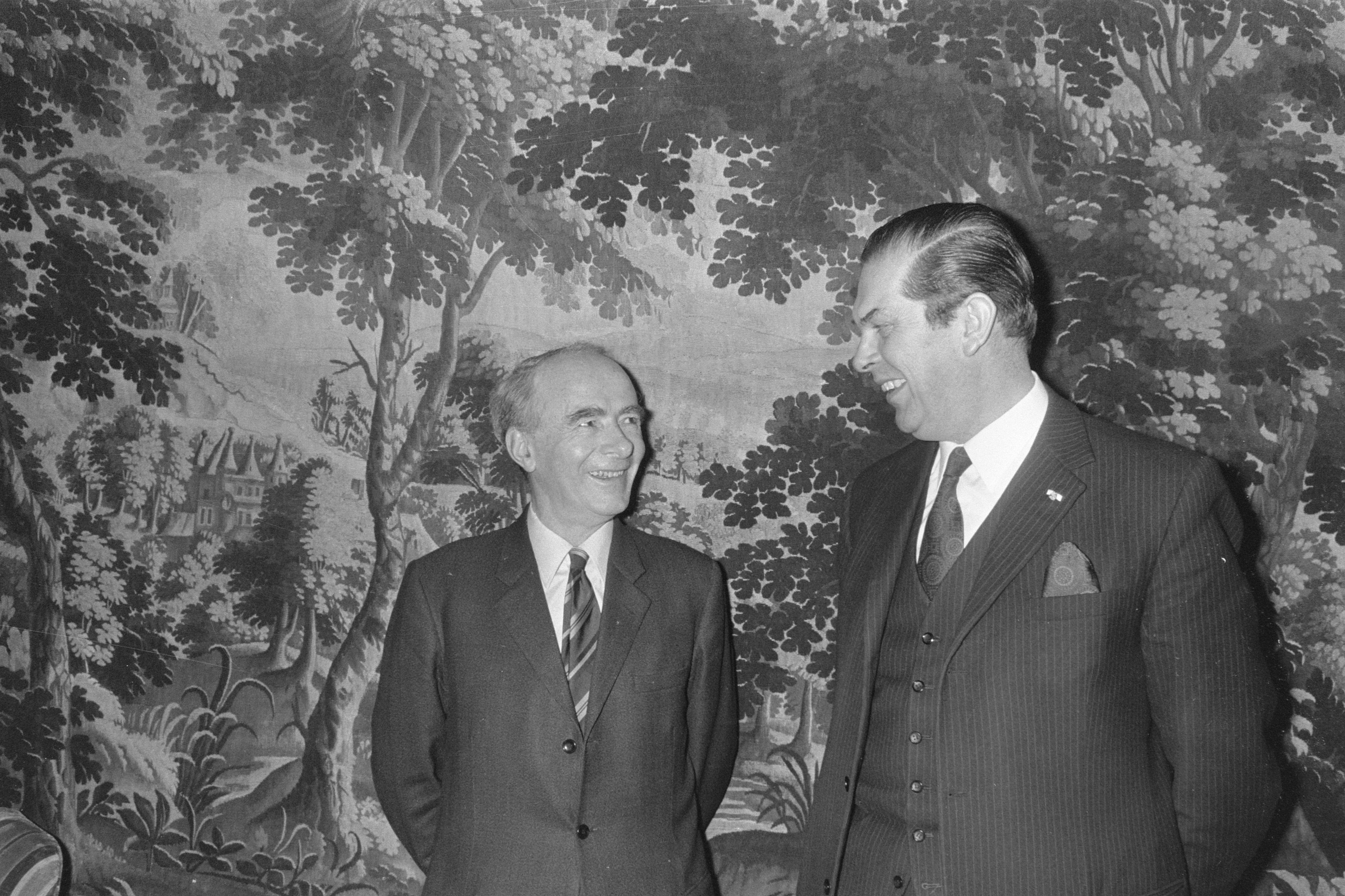
Prime Minister of Norway Trygve Bratteli and Prime Minister Barend Biesheuvel at the Catshuis on 8 January 1972.

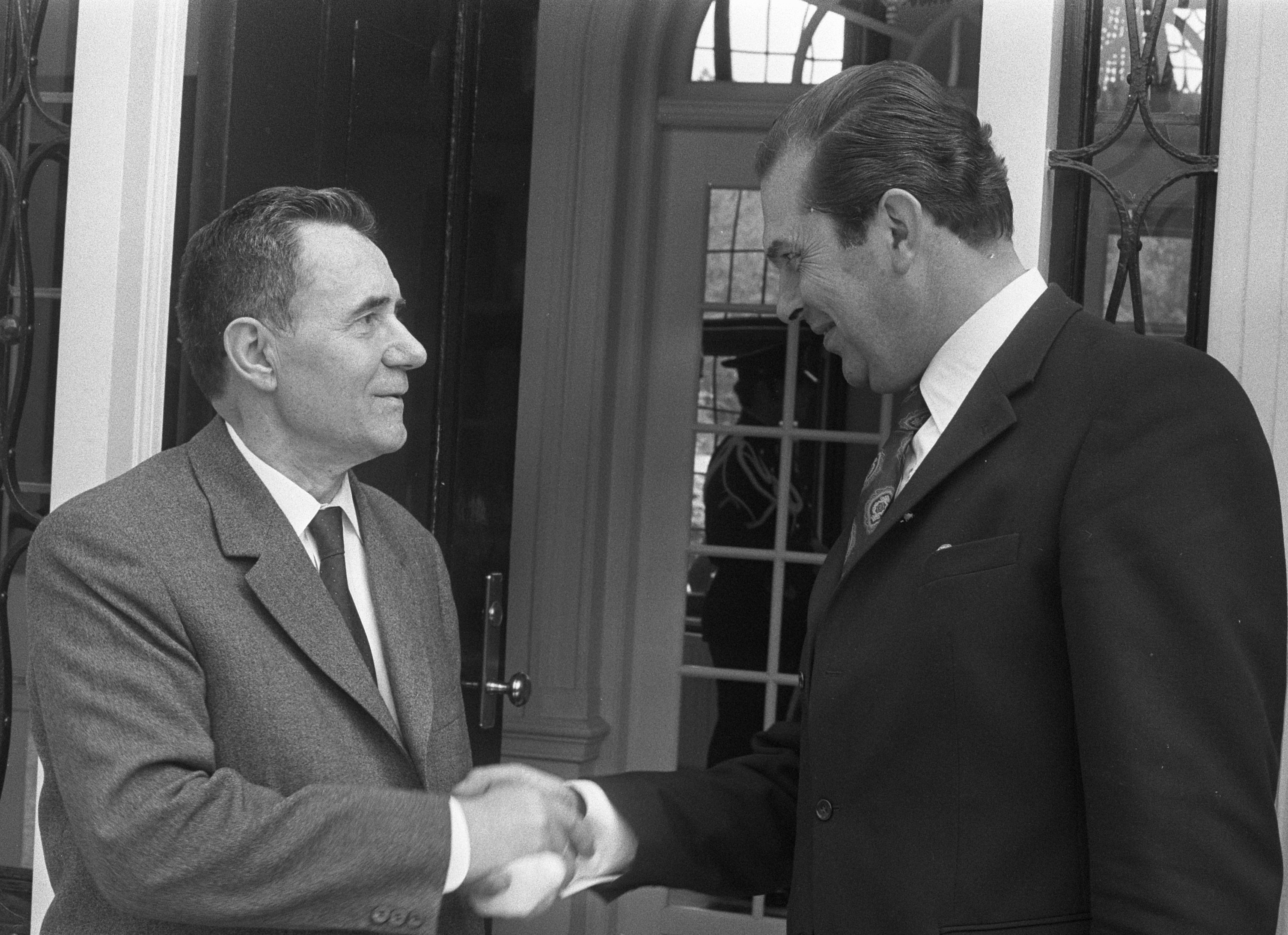
Soviet Minister of Foreign Affairs Andrei Gromyko and Prime Minister Barend Biesheuvel at the Catshuis op 5 July 1972.

== Cabinet members ==
Ministers		Title/Ministry/Portfolio(s)			Term of office	Party
Barend Biesheuvel	Barend Biesheuvel (1920–2001)	Prime Minister	General Affairs		6 July 1971 – 11 May 1973^{[Continued]}	Anti-Revolutionary; Party
Roelof Nelissen	Roelof Nelissen (1931–2019)	Deputy; Prime Minister	Finance		6 July 1971 – 11 May 1973^{[Continued]}	Catholic; People's Party
Roelof Nelissen	Roelof Nelissen (1931–2019)	Minister	Finance		6 July 1971 – 11 May 1973^{[Continued]}	Catholic; People's Party
Molly Geertsema	Molly Geertsema (1918–1991)	Deputy; Prime Minister	Interior		6 July 1971 – 11 May 1973^{[Continued]}	People's Party for Freedom and Democracy
Molly Geertsema	Molly Geertsema (1918–1991)	Minister	Interior		6 July 1971 – 11 May 1973^{[Continued]}	People's Party for Freedom and Democracy
Norbert Schmelzer	Norbert Schmelzer (1921–2008)	Minister	Foreign Affairs		6 July 1971 – 11 May 1973^{[Continued]}	Catholic; People's Party
Dries van Agt	Dries van Agt (1931–2024)	Minister	Justice		6 July 1971 – 8 September 1977^{[Continued]}	Catholic; People's Party
Harry Langman	Harrie Langman (1931–2016)	Minister	Economic Affairs		6 July 1971 – 11 May 1973^{[Continued]}	People's Party for Freedom and Democracy
Hans de Koster	Hans de Koster (1914–1992)	Minister	Defence		6 July 1971 – 11 May 1973^{[Continued]}	People's Party for Freedom and Democracy
Louis Stuyt	Louis Stuyt (1914–2000)	Minister	Health and Environment		6 July 1971 – 11 May 1973^{[Continued]}	Catholic; People's Party
Jaap Boersma	Jaap Boersma (1929–2012)	Minister	Social Affairs		6 July 1971 – 19 December 1977^{[Continued]}	Anti-Revolutionary; Party
Chris van Veen	Chris van Veen (1922–2009)	Minister	Education and Sciences		6 July 1971 – 11 May 1973^{[Continued]}	Christian; Historical Union
Willem Drees Jr.	Willem Drees Jr. (1922–1998)	Minister	Transport and Water Management		6 July 1971 – 21 July 1972^{[Res]}	Democratic; Socialists '70
Bé Udink	Bé Udink (1926–2016)	Minister	Transport and Water Management		21 July 1972 – 11 May 1973^{[Continued]}	Christian; Historical Union
Pierre Lardinois	Pierre Lardinois (1924–1987)	Minister	Agriculture and Fisheries		5 April 1967 – 1 January 1973^{[Retained]} ^{[Continued]}	Catholic; People's Party
Bé Udink	Bé Udink (1926–2016)	Minister	Housing and Spatial Planning		6 July 1971 – 11 May 1973^{[Continued]}	Christian; Historical Union
Piet Engels	Piet Engels (1923–1994)	Minister	Culture, Recreation and Social Work		6 July 1971 – 11 May 1973^{[Continued]}	Catholic; People's Party
Ministers without portfolio		Title/Ministry/Portfolio(s)			Term of office	Party
Roelof Nelissen	Roelof Nelissen (1931–2019)	Minister	Interior	• Suriname and Netherlands; Antilles Affairs	6 July 1971 – 28 January 1972	Catholic; People's Party
Pierre Lardinois	Pierre Lardinois (1924–1987)	Minister	Interior	• Suriname and Netherlands; Antilles Affairs	28 January 1972 – 1 January 1973^{[Continued]}	Catholic; People's Party
Kees Boertien	Kees Boertien (1927–2002)	Minister	Foreign Affairs	• Development; Cooperation	6 July 1971 – 11 May 1973^{[Continued]}	Anti-Revolutionary; Party
Mauk de Brauw	Jonkheer; Mauk de Brauw (1925–1984)	Minister	Education and Sciences	• Higher; Education • Science Policy	6 July 1971 – 21 July 1972^{[Res]}	Democratic; Socialists '70
Chris van Veen	Chris van Veen (1922–2009)	Minister	Education and Sciences	• Higher; Education • Science Policy	21 July 1972 – 11 May 1973^{[Continued]}	Christian; Historical Union
State Secretaries		Title/Ministry/Portfolio(s)			Term of office	Party
Jan van Stuijvenberg	Jan van Stuijvenberg (born 1928)	State Secretary	Interior	• Municipalities • civil service	17 July 1971 – 21 July 1972^{[Res]}	Democratic; Socialists '70
Tjerk Westerterp	Tjerk Westerterp (1930–2023)	State Secretary	Foreign Affairs	• European Union • Benelux	17 August 1971 – 7 March 1973^{[Continued]}	Catholic; People's Party
Willem Scholten	Willem Scholten (1927–2005)	State Secretary	Finance	• Fiscal Policy • Tax and Customs	14 July 1971 – 19 March 1973^{[Continued]}	Christian; Historical Union
Fons van der Stee	Fons van der Stee (1928–1999)	State Secretary	Finance	• Governmental; Budget	14 July 1971 – 12 March 1973^{[Continued]}	Catholic; People's Party
Hans Grosheide	Hans Grosheide (1930–2022)	State Secretary	Justice	• Immigration and Asylum • Civil Law • Youth Justice • Penitentiaries	28 July 1971 – 11 May 1973^{[Continued]}	Anti-Revolutionary; Party
Jan Oostenbrink	Jan Oostenbrink (1936–2025)	State Secretary	Economic Affairs	• Small and Medium-sized; Businesses • Consumer; Protection • Tourism	17 July 1971 – 11 May 1973^{[Continued]}	Catholic; People's Party
Adri van Es	Adri van Es (1913–1994)	State Secretary	Defence	• Human; Resources • Equipment	14 August 1963 – 16 September 1972^{[Retained]} ^{[Continued]}	Anti-Revolutionary; Party
Koos Rietkerk	Koos Rietkerk (1927–1986)	State Secretary	Social Affairs	• Social Security • Unemployment • Occupational; Safety • Social Services	28 July 1971 – 23 April 1973^{[Continued]}	People's Party for Freedom and Democracy
Kees Schelfhout	Kees Schelfhout (1918–1983)	State Secretary	Education and Sciences	• Primary; Education • Special; Education • Preschool	28 July 1971 – 11 May 1973^{[Continued]}	Catholic; People's Party
Roelof Kruisinga	Roelof Kruisinga (1922–2012)	State Secretary	Transport and Water Management	• Public; Infrastructure • Public; Transport • Rail Transport • Water; Management • Postal Service • Weather; Forecasting	28 July 1971 – 20 March 1973^{[Continued]}	Christian; Historical Union
	Werner Buck (1925–2010)	State Secretary	Housing and Spatial Planning	• Urban Planning • Spatial Planning	17 August 1971 – 11 May 1973^{[Continued]}	Catholic; People's Party
Fia van Veenendaal-van Meggelen	Fia van Veenendaal- van Meggelen (1918–2005)	State Secretary	Culture, Recreation and Social Work	• Social Services • Disability Policy	28 July 1971 – 21 July 1972^{[Res]}	Democratic; Socialists '70
Henk Vonhoff	Henk Vonhoff (1931–2010)	State Secretary	Culture, Recreation and Social Work	• Youth Care • Nature • Culture • Art • Recreation • Sport	28 July 1971 – 23 April 1973^{[Continued]}	People's Party for Freedom and Democracy

^{Resigned}
^{Retained from the previous cabinet}
^{Continued in the next cabinet}

== Trivia ==
- Six cabinet members (later) served as Party Leaders and Lijsttrekkers: Barend Biesheuvel (1963–1973) of the Anti-Revolutionary Party, Molly Geertsema (1969–1971) of the People's Party for Freedom and Democracy, Norbert Schmelzer (1963–1971) of the Catholic People's Party, Dries van Agt (1976–1982) of the Christian Democratic Appeal, Willem Drees Jr. (1971–1977) of the Democratic Socialists '70, Bé Udink (1970–1971) and Roelof Kruisinga (1971–1977) of the Christian Historical Union.
- Five cabinet members had previous experience as scholars and professors: Dries van Agt (Criminal Law and Procedure), Louis Stuyt (Internal Medicine), Willem Drees Jr. (Public Economics), Kees Boertien (Commercial Law) and Roelof Kruisinga (Otorhinolaryngology).
- Four cabinet members (later) served as Queen's Commissioner: Molly Geertsema (Gelderland), Dries van Agt (North Brabant), Kees Boertien (Zeeland) and Henk Vonhoff (Groningen).
