= Minister without portfolio (Netherlands) =

In the Netherlands, a minister without portfolio (Dutch: minister zonder portefeuille) is a Government minister that does not head a specific ministry, but assumes the same power and responsibilities as a minister that does. The minister is responsible for a specific part of another minister's policy field. In that sense, a minister without portfolio is comparable to a state secretary (staatssecretaris), a junior minister in Dutch politics, who also falls under another ministry and is responsible for a specific part of that minister's policy field. However, one distinct difference is that a minister without portfolio is a member of the Council of Ministers and can vote in it, whereas a state secretary is not. The minister for development cooperation has always been a minister without portfolio.

== List of ministers without portfolio by cabinet ==
=== Second Gerbrandy cabinet ===
Minister		Title	Portfolio	Ministry	Term of office	Other function(s)	Party
Jaap Burger	Jaap Burger (1904–1986)	Minister for Return Policy	• Provisional Government Reconstruction	Ministry of the Interior	11 August 1943 – 31 May 1944^{[Appt]}		Social Democratic; Workers' Party
Edgar Michiels van Verduynen	Jonkheer; Edgar Michiels van Verduynen (1885–1952)	Minister for Foreign Policy	• Designated Acting Minister of Foreign Affairs	Ministry of Foreign Affairs	1 January 1942 – 23 February 1945		Independent; Liberal (Classical Liberal)
Adipati Soejono	Pangeran; Adipati Soejono (1886–1943)	Minister for Colonial Policy	• Indonesian Political Affairs	Ministry of Colonial Affairs	9 June 1942 – 5 January 1943^{[Died]}		Independent; Conservative (Social Conservative)
Source:(in Dutch) Parlement & Politiek

=== Third Gerbrandy cabinet ===
Minister		Title	Portfolio	Ministry	Term of office	Other function(s)	Party
Edgar Michiels van Verduynen	Jonkheer; Edgar Michiels van Verduynen (1885–1952)	Minister for Foreign Policy	• Designated Acting Minister of Foreign Affairs	Ministry of Foreign Affairs	23 February 1945 – 25 June 1945		Independent; Liberal (Classical Liberal)
Source: (in Dutch) Parlement & Politiek

=== Schermerhorn–Drees cabinet ===
Minister		Title	Portfolio	Ministry	Term of office	Other function(s)	Party
Herman van Roijen	Dr. Herman van Roijen (1905–1991)	Minister for Foreign Policy	• United Nations Affairs • NATO Affairs • Benelux Affairs • Development Cooperation • Indonesian Political Affairs • New Guinea Political Affairs • International Aviation Policy	Ministry of Foreign Affairs	25 June 1945 – 1 March 1946^{[Appt]}		Independent; Social Democrat
Eelco van Kleffens	Eelco van Kleffens (1894–1983)	Minister for Foreign Policy	• United Nations Affairs • NATO Affairs • Benelux Affairs • Development Cooperation • Indonesian Political Affairs • New Guinea Political Affairs • International Aviation Policy	Ministry of Foreign Affairs	1 March 1946 – 3 July 1946		Independent; Liberal (Classical Liberal)

=== First Beel cabinet ===
Minister		Title	Portfolio	Ministry	Term of office	Other function(s)	Party
Eelco van Kleffens	Eelco van Kleffens (1894–1983)	Minister for Foreign Policy	• United Nations Affairs • NATO Affairs • Benelux Affairs • Development Cooperation • Indonesian Political Affairs • New Guinea Political Affairs • International Aviation Policy	Ministry of Foreign Affairs	3 July 1946 – 1 July 1947^{[Res]}		Independent; Liberal (Classical Liberal)
Lubbertus Götzen	Lubbertus Götzen (1894–1979)	Minister for Colonial Policy	• Indonesian Monetary Policy	Ministry of Colonial Affairs	11 November 1947 – 7 August 1948		Independent; Christian Democrat (Protestant)
Source: (in Dutch)

=== Drees–Van Schaik cabinet ===
Minister		Title	Portfolio	Ministry	Term of office	Other function(s)	Party
Josef van Schaik	Josef van Schaik (1882–1962)	Minister for Kingdom; Reconstruction	• Kingdom Reconstruction • Decolonization Policy	Ministry of the Interior	7 August 1948 – 15 March 1951	Deputy Prime Minister (7 Aug 1948 – 15 Mar 1951)	Catholic People's Party
Josef van Schaik	Josef van Schaik (1882–1962)	Minister for Kingdom; Reconstruction	• Kingdom Reconstruction • Decolonization Policy	Ministry of the Interior	7 August 1948 – 15 March 1951	Ad interim Minister of Transport and Water Management (7 Aug 1948 – 1 Nov 1948 )	Catholic People's Party
Josef van Schaik	Josef van Schaik (1882–1962)	Minister for Kingdom; Reconstruction	• Kingdom Reconstruction • Decolonization Policy	Ministry of the Interior	7 August 1948 – 15 March 1951	Ad interim Minister of the Interior (15 Jun 1949 – 20 Sep 1949)	Catholic People's Party
Lubbertus Götzen	Lubbertus Götzen (1894–1979)	Minister for Colonial Policy	• Indonesian Monetary Policy	Ministry of Colonial Affairs	7 August 1948 – 15 March 1951		Independent; Christian Democrat (Protestant)

=== First Drees cabinet ===
Minister		Title	Portfolio	Ministry	Term of office	Other function(s)	Party
Frans Teulings	Frans Teulings (1891–1966)	Minister for Civil Defence	• Emergency Services • Disaster Management	Ministry of the Interior	15 March 1951 – 2 September 1952	Deputy Prime Minister (15 Mar 1951 – 2 Sep 1952)	Catholic People's Party
Frans Teulings	Frans Teulings (1891–1966)	Minister for Civil Defence	• Emergency Services • Disaster Management	Ministry of the Interior	15 March 1951 – 2 September 1952	Ad interim Minister of the Interior (18 Nov 1951 – 6 Dec 1951)	Catholic People's Party
Guus Albregts	Dr. Guus Albregts (1900–1980)	Minister for Economic Policy	• Privatization Policy • Small Business Policy • Retail Policy • Competition Policy • Regional Development • Public Sector Organisations	Ministry of the Interior	15 March 1951 – 2 September 1952		Catholic People's Party

=== Second Drees cabinet ===
Minister		Title	Portfolio	Ministry	Term of office	Other function(s)	Party
A. C. de Bruijn	Ad de Bruijn (1887–1968)	Minister for Economic Policy	• Privatization Policy • Regional Development • Public Sector Organisations	Ministry of the Interior	2 September 1952 – 13 October 1956		Catholic People's Party
Joseph Luns	Dr. Joseph Luns (1911–2002)	Minister for Foreign Policy	• United Nations Affairs • NATO Affairs • Benelux Affairs • Development Cooperation • Indonesian Political Affairs • New Guinea Political Affairs • International Aviation Policy	Ministry of Foreign Affairs	2 September 1952 – 13 October 1956		Catholic People's Party

=== De Quay cabinet ===
Minister		Title	Portfolio	Ministry	Term of office	Other function(s)	Party
Henk Korthals	Henk Korthals (1911–1976)	Minister for Overseas Affairs	• Suriname Affairs • Netherlands Antilles Affairs	Ministry of the Interior	19 May 1959 – 1 September 1959	Deputy Prime Minister; Minister of Transport and Water Management	People's Party for Freedom and Democracy
Henk Korthals	Henk Korthals (1911–1976)	Minister for Suriname and Netherlands Antilles Affairs	• Suriname Affairs • Netherlands Antilles Affairs	Ministry of the Interior	1 September 1959 – 24 July 1963	Deputy Prime Minister; Minister of Transport and Water Management	People's Party for Freedom and Democracy

=== Marijnen cabinet ===
Minister		Title	Portfolio	Ministry	Term of office	Other function(s)	Party
Barend Biesheuvel	Barend Biesheuvel (1920–2001)	Minister for Suriname and Netherlands Antilles Affairs	• Suriname Affairs • Netherlands Antilles Affairs	Ministry of the Interior	24 July 1963 – 14 April 1965	Deputy Prime Minister; Ministers of Agriculture and Fisheries	Anti-Revolutionary Party

=== Cals cabinet ===
Minister		Title	Portfolio	Ministry	Term of office	Other function(s)	Party
Barend Biesheuvel	Barend Biesheuvel (1920–2001)	Minister for Suriname and Netherlands Antilles Affairs	• Suriname Affairs • Netherlands Antilles Affairs	Ministry of the Interior	14 April 1965 – 22 November 1966	Deputy Prime Minister; Ministers of Agriculture and Fisheries	Anti-Revolutionary Party
Theo Bot	Theo Bot (1911–1984)	Minister for Aid to Developing Countries	• International Development • Development Aid	Ministry of Foreign Affairs	14 April 1965 – 22 November 1966		Catholic People's Party

=== Zijlstra cabinet ===
Minister		Title	Portfolio	Ministry	Term of office	Other function(s)	Party
Barend Biesheuvel	Barend Biesheuvel (1920–2001)	Minister for Suriname and Netherlands Antilles Affairs	• Suriname Affairs • Netherlands Antilles Affairs	Ministry of the Interior	22 November 1966 – 5 April 1967	Deputy Prime Minister; Ministers of Agriculture and Fisheries	Anti-Revolutionary Party
Theo Bot	Theo Bot (1911–1984)	Minister for Aid to Developing Countries	• International Development • Development Aid	Ministry of Foreign Affairs	22 November 1966 – 5 April 1967		Catholic People's Party

=== De Jong cabinet ===
Minister		Title	Portfolio	Ministry	Term of office	Other function(s)	Party
Joop Bakker	Joop Bakker (1921–2003)	Minister for Suriname and Netherlands Antilles Affairs	• Suriname Affairs • Netherlands Antilles Affairs	Ministry of the Interior	5 April 1967 – 6 July 1971	Deputy Prime Minister; Minister of Transport and Water Management	Anti-Revolutionary Party
Bé Udink	Bé Udink (1926–2016)	Minister for Aid to Developing Countries	• International Development • Development Aid	Ministry of Foreign Affairs	5 April 1967 – 6 July 1971		Christian Historical Union

=== First Biesheuvel cabinet ===
Minister		Title	Portfolio	Ministry	Term of office	Other function(s)	Party
Roelof Nelissen	Roelof Nelissen (1931–2019)	Minister for Suriname and Netherlands Antilles Affairs	• Suriname Affairs • Netherlands Antilles Affairs	Ministry of the Interior	6 July 1971 – 28 January 1972	Deputy Prime Minister; Minister of Finance	Catholic People's Party
Pierre Lardinois	Pierre Lardinois (1924–1987)	Minister for Suriname and Netherlands Antilles Affairs	• Suriname Affairs • Netherlands Antilles Affairs	Ministry of the Interior	28 January 1972 – 9 August 1972	Ministers of Agriculture and Fisheries	Catholic People's Party
Kees Boertien	Dr. Kees Boertien (1927–2002)	Minister for Development Cooperation	• International Development • Development Aid • International Environmental Policies	Ministry of Foreign Affairs	6 July 1971 – 9 August 1972		Anti-Revolutionary Party
Mauk de Brauw	Jonkheer; Mauk de Brauw (1925–1984)	Minister for Higher Education and Science Policy	• Higher Education • Science Policy	Ministry of Education and Sciences	6 July 1971 – 21 July 1972^{[Res]}		Democratic; Socialists '70
Chris van Veen	Chris van Veen (1922–2009)	Minister for Higher Education and Science Policy	• Higher Education • Science Policy	Ministry of Education and Sciences	21 July 1972 – 9 August 1972	Minister of Education and Sciences	Christian Historical Union

=== Second Biesheuvel cabinet ===
Minister		Title	Portfolio	Ministry	Term of office	Other function(s)	Party
Pierre Lardinois	Pierre Lardinois (1924–1987)	Minister for Suriname and Netherlands Antilles Affairs	• Suriname Affairs • Netherlands Antilles Affairs	Ministry of the Interior	9 August 1972 – 1 January 1973^{[Appt]}	Ministers of Agriculture and Fisheries	Catholic People's Party
Molly Geertsema	Molly Geertsema (1918–1991)	Minister for Suriname and Netherlands Antilles Affairs	• Suriname Affairs • Netherlands Antilles Affairs	Ministry of the Interior	1 January 1973 – 11 May 1973	Deputy Prime Minister; Minister of the Interior	People's Party for Freedom and Democracy
Kees Boertien	Dr. Kees Boertien (1927–2002)	Minister for Development Cooperation	• International Development • Development Aid • International Environmental Policies	Ministry of Foreign Affairs	9 August 1972 – 11 May 1973		Anti-Revolutionary Party
Chris van Veen	Chris van Veen (1922–2009)	Minister for Higher Education and Science Policy	• Higher Education • Science Policy	Ministry of Education and Sciences	9 August 1972 – 11 May 1973	Minister of Education and Sciences	Christian Historical Union

=== Den Uyl cabinet ===
Minister		Title	Portfolio	Ministry	Term of office	Other function(s)	Party
Gaius de Gaay Fortman	Dr. Gaius de Gaay Fortman (1911–1997)	Minister for Suriname and Netherlands Antilles Affairs	• Suriname Affairs • Netherlands Antilles Affairs	Ministry of the Interior	11 May 1973 – 25 November 1975	Minister of the Interior (11 May 1973 – 19 Dec 1977)	Anti-Revolutionary Party
Gaius de Gaay Fortman	Dr. Gaius de Gaay Fortman (1911–1997)	Minister for Netherlands; Antilles Affairs	• Netherlands Antilles Affairs	Ministry of the Interior	25 November 1975 – 19 December 1977	Deputy Prime Minister; Ministers of Justice (8 Sep 1977 – 19 Dec 1977)	Anti-Revolutionary Party
Jan Pronk	Jan Pronk (born 1940)	Minister for Development Cooperation	• International Development • Development Aid • International Environmental Policies	Ministry of Foreign Affairs	11 May 1973 – 19 December 1977		Labour Party
Boy Trip	Boy Trip (1921–1990)	Minister for Science Policy	• Science Policy	Ministry of Education and Sciences	19 December 1977 – 19 December 1977		Political Party of Radicals

=== First Van Agt cabinet ===
Minister		Title	Portfolio	Ministry	Term of office	Other function(s)	Party
Fons van der Stee	Fons van der Stee (1928–1999)	Minister for Netherlands; Antilles Affairs	• Netherlands Antilles Affairs	Ministry of the Interior	19 December 1977 – 11 September 1981	Ministers of Agriculture and Fisheries (19 Dec 1977 – 5 Mar 1980)	Catholic People's Party
Fons van der Stee	Fons van der Stee (1928–1999)	Minister for Netherlands; Antilles Affairs	• Netherlands Antilles Affairs	Ministry of the Interior	19 December 1977 – 11 September 1981	Minister of Finance (5 Mar 1980 – 11 Sep 1981)	Christian Democratic Appeal
Jan de Koning	Jan de Koning (1926–1994)	Minister for Development Cooperation	• International Development • Development Aid • International Environmental Policies	Ministry of Foreign Affairs	19 December 1977 – 11 September 1981	Ad interim Minister of Defence (4 Mar 1978 – 8 Mar 1978)	Anti-Revolutionary Party
Jan de Koning	Jan de Koning (1926–1994)	Minister for Development Cooperation	• International Development • Development Aid • International Environmental Policies	Ministry of Foreign Affairs	19 December 1977 – 11 September 1981	Ad interim Minister of Defence (4 Mar 1978 – 8 Mar 1978)	Christian Democratic Appeal
Rinus Peijnenburg	Rinus Peijnenburg (1928–1979)	Minister for Science Policy	• Science Policy	Ministry of Education and Sciences	19 December 1977 – 1 April 1979^{[Died]}		Catholic People's Party
Leendert Ginjaar	Dr. Leendert Ginjaar (1928–2003)	Minister for Science Policy	• Science Policy	Ministry of Education and Sciences	1 April 1979 – 3 May 1979^{[Ad interim]}	Minister of Health and Environment	People's Party for Freedom and Democracy
Ton van Trier	Dr. Ton van Trier (1926–1983)	Minister for Science Policy	• Science Policy	Ministry of Education and Sciences	3 May 1979 – 11 September 1981		Independent; Christian Democrat (Catholic)
Ton van Trier	Dr. Ton van Trier (1926–1983)	Minister for Science Policy	• Science Policy	Ministry of Education and Sciences	3 May 1979 – 11 September 1981		Catholic People's Party
Ton van Trier	Dr. Ton van Trier (1926–1983)	Minister for Science Policy	• Science Policy	Ministry of Education and Sciences	3 May 1979 – 11 September 1981		Christian Democratic Appeal

=== Second Van Agt cabinet ===
Minister		Title	Portfolio	Ministry	Term of office	Other function(s)	Party
Joop den Uyl	Joop den Uyl (1919–1987)	Minister for Netherlands; Antilles Affairs	• Netherlands Antilles Affairs	Ministry of the Interior	11 September 1981 – 29 May 1982^{[Res]}	Deputy Prime Minister; Minister of Social Affairs and Employment	Labour Party
Kees van Dijk	Kees van Dijk (1931–2008)	Minister for Development Cooperation	• International Development • Development Aid • International Environmental Policies	Ministry of Foreign Affairs	11 September 1981 – 29 May 1982		Christian Democratic Appeal

=== Third Van Agt cabinet ===
Minister		Title	Portfolio	Ministry	Term of office	Other function(s)	Party
Jan de Koning	Jan de Koning (1926–1994)	Minister for Netherlands; Antilles Affairs	• Netherlands Antilles Affairs	Ministry of the Interior	29 May 1982 – 4 November 1982	Minister of Agriculture and Fisheries	Christian Democratic Appeal
Kees van Dijk	Kees van Dijk (1931–2008)	Minister for Development Cooperation	• International Development • Development Aid • International Environmental Policies	Ministry of Foreign Affairs	29 May 1982 – 4 November 1982		Christian Democratic Appeal

=== First Lubbers cabinet ===
Minister		Title	Portfolio	Ministry	Term of office	Other function(s)	Party
Jan de Koning	Jan de Koning (1926–1994)	Minister for Netherlands; Antilles and Aruba Affairs	• Netherlands Antilles Affairs • Aruba Affairs	Ministry of the Interior	4 November 1982 – 14 July 1986	Minister of Social Affairs and Employment	Christian Democratic Appeal
Eegje Schoo	Eegje Schoo (born 1944)	Minister for Development Cooperation	• International Development • Development Aid • International Environmental Policies	Ministry of Foreign Affairs	4 November 1982 – 14 July 1986		People's Party for Freedom and Democracy

=== Second Lubbers cabinet ===
Minister		Title	Portfolio	Ministry	Term of office	Other function(s)	Party
Jan de Koning	Jan de Koning (1926–1994)	Minister for Netherlands; Antilles and Aruba Affairs	• Netherlands Antilles Affairs • Aruba Affairs	Ministry of the Interior	14 July 1986 – 7 November 1989	Minister of Social Affairs and Employment (14 Jul 1986 – 7 Nov 1989)	Christian Democratic Appeal
Jan de Koning	Jan de Koning (1926–1994)	Minister for Netherlands; Antilles and Aruba Affairs	• Netherlands Antilles Affairs • Aruba Affairs	Ministry of the Interior	14 July 1986 – 7 November 1989	Ad interim Minister of the Interior (3 Feb 1987 – 6 May 1987)	Christian Democratic Appeal
Piet Bukman	Piet Bukman (born 1934)	Minister for Development Cooperation	• International Development • Development Aid • International Environmental Policies	Ministry of Foreign Affairs	14 July 1986 – 7 November 1989		Christian Democratic Appeal

=== Third Lubbers cabinet ===
Minister		Title	Portfolio	Ministry	Term of office	Other function(s)	Party
Piet Hein Donner	Ruud Lubbers (1939–2018)	Minister for Netherlands; Antilles and Aruba Affairs	• Netherlands Antilles Affairs • Aruba Affairs	Ministry of the Interior	7 November 1989 – 14 November 1989^{[Ad interim]}	Prime Minister	Christian Democratic Appeal
Ernst Hirsch Ballin	Dr. Ernst Hirsch Ballin (born 1950)	Minister for Netherlands; Antilles and Aruba Affairs	• Netherlands Antilles Affairs • Aruba Affairs	Ministry of the Interior	14 November 1989 – 27 May 1994^{[Res]}	Minister of Justice	Christian Democratic Appeal
Ruud Lubbers	Ruud Lubbers (1939–2018)	Minister for Netherlands; Antilles and Aruba Affairs	• Netherlands Antilles Affairs • Aruba Affairs	Ministry of the Interior	27 May 1994 – 22 August 1994	Prime Minister	Christian Democratic Appeal
Jan Pronk	Jan Pronk (born 1940)	Minister for Development Cooperation	• International Development • Development Aid • International Environmental Policies	Ministry of Foreign Affairs	7 November 1989 – 22 Augustus 1994		Labour Party

=== First Kok cabinet ===
Minister		Title	Portfolio	Ministry	Term of office	Other function(s)	Party
Joris Voorhoeve	Dr. Joris Voorhoeve (born 1945)	Minister for Netherlands; Antilles and Aruba Affairs	• Netherlands Antilles Affairs • Aruba Affairs	Ministry of the Interior	22 August 1994 – 3 August 1998	Minister of Defence	People's Party for Freedom and Democracy
Jan Pronk	Jan Pronk (born 1940)	Minister for Development Cooperation	• International Development • Development Aid • International Environmental Policies	Ministry of Foreign Affairs	22 August 1994 – 3 August 1998		Labour Party

=== Second Kok cabinet ===
Minister		Title	Portfolio	Ministry	Term of office	Other function(s)	Party
Roger van Boxtel	Roger van Boxtel (born 1954)	Minister for Integration and Urban Planning	• Integration • Government Real Estate • Urban Planning • Public Housing • Minority Affairs	Ministry of the Interior and Kingdom Relations	3 August 1998 – 22 July 2002	Ad interim Minister of the Interior and Kingdom Relations (13 Mar 2000 – 24 Mar 2000)	Democrats 66
Eveline Herfkens	Eveline Herfkens (born 1952)	Minister for Development Cooperation	• International Development • Development Aid • International Environmental Policies	Ministry of Foreign Affairs	3 August 1998 – 22 July 2002		Labour Party

=== First Balkenende cabinet ===
Minister		Title	Portfolio	Ministry	Term of office	Other function(s)	Party
Hilbrand Nawijn	Hilbrand Nawijn (born 1948)	Minister for Integration and Asylum Affairs	• Integration • Immigration • Asylum Affairs • Minority Affairs	Ministry of Justice	22 July 2002 – 27 May 2003		Pim Fortuyn List

=== Second Balkenende cabinet ===
Minister		Title	Portfolio	Ministry	Term of office	Other function(s)	Party
Thom de Graaf	Thom de Graaf (born 1957)	Minister for Government Reform and Kingdom Relations	• Central Government Affairs • Local Government Affairs • Government Reform • Government Real Estate • Kingdom Relations	Ministry of the Interior and Kingdom Relations	27 May 2003 – 23 March 2005^{[Res]}	Deputy Prime Minister	Democrats 66
Alexander Pechtold	Alexander Pechtold (born 1965)	Minister for Government Reform and Kingdom Relations	• Central Government Affairs • Local Government Affairs • Government Reform • Government Real Estate • Kingdom Relations	Ministry of the Interior and Kingdom Relations	31 March 2005 – 3 July 2006^{[Res]}		Democrats 66
Agnes van Ardenne	Agnes van Ardenne (born 1950)	Minister for Development Cooperation	• International Development • Development Aid • International Environmental Policies	Ministry of Foreign Affairs	27 May 2003 – 7 July 2006		Christian Democratic Appeal
Rita Verdonk	Rita Verdonk (born 1955)	Minister for Integration and Asylum Affairs	• Integration • Immigration • Asylum Affairs • Minority Affairs	Ministry of Justice	27 May 2003 – 7 July 2006		People's Party for Freedom and Democracy

=== Third Balkenende cabinet ===
Minister		Title	Portfolio	Ministry	Term of office	Other function(s)	Party
Atzo Nicolaï	Atzo Nicolaï (born 1960)	Minister for Government Reform and Kingdom Relations	• Central Government Affairs • Local Government Affairs • Government Reform • Government Real Estate • Kingdom Relations	Ministry of the Interior and Kingdom Relations	7 July 2006 – 22 February 2007		People's Party for Freedom and Democracy
Agnes van Ardenne	Agnes van Ardenne (born 1950)	Minister for Development Cooperation	• International Development • Development Aid • International Environmental Policies	Ministry of Foreign Affairs	7 July 2006 – 22 February 2007		Christian Democratic Appeal
Rita Verdonk	Rita Verdonk (born 1955)	Minister for Integration and Asylum Affairs	• Integration • Immigration • Asylum Affairs • Minority Affairs	Ministry of Justice	7 July 2006 – 14 December 2006	Ad interim Minister of Justice (21 Sep 2006 – 22 Sep 2006)	People's Party for Freedom and Democracy
Rita Verdonk	Rita Verdonk (born 1955)	Minister for Integration, Rehabilitation, Prevention and Youth Justice	• Integration • Youth Justice • Rehabilitation • Prevention • Minority Affairs	Ministry of Justice	14 December 2006 – 22 February 2007		People's Party for Freedom and Democracy

=== Fourth Balkenende cabinet ===
Minister		Title	Portfolio	Ministry	Term of office	Other function(s)	Party
Bert Koenders	Bert Koenders (born 1958)	Minister for Development Cooperation	• International Development • Development Aid • International Environmental Policies	Ministry of Foreign Affairs	22 February 2007 – 23 February 2010^{[Res]}		Labour Party
Maxime Verhagen	Maxime Verhagen (born 1956)	Minister for Development Cooperation	• International Development • Development Aid • International Environmental Policies	Ministry of Foreign Affairs	23 February 2010 – 14 October 2010	Minister of Foreign Affairs	Christian Democratic Appeal
André Rouvoet	André Rouvoet (born 1962)	Minister for Youth Policy and Family Policy	• Youth Policy • Family Policy • Provincial Healthcare • Local Healthcare	Ministry of Health, Welfare and Sport	22 February 2007 – 14 October 2010	Deputy Prime Minister (22 Feb 2007 – 14 Oct 2010); Minister of Education, Culture and Science (23 Feb 2010 – 14 Oct 2010)	Christian Union
Ella Vogelaar	Ella Vogelaar (1949–2019)	Minister for Housing, Communities and Integration	• Integration • Urban Planning • Public Housing • Communities • Minority Affairs	Ministry of Housing, Spatial; Planning and the Environment	22 February 2007 – 14 November 2008^{[Res]}		Labour Party
Eberhard van der Laan	Eberhard van der Laan (1955–2017)	Minister for Housing, Communities and Integration	• Integration • Urban Planning • Public Housing • Communities • Minority Affairs	Ministry of Housing, Spatial; Planning and the Environment	14 November 2008 – 23 February 2010^{[Res]}		Labour Party
Eimert van Middelkoop	Eimert van Middelkoop (born 1949)	Minister for Housing, Communities and Integration	• Integration • Urban Planning • Public Housing • Communities • Minority Affairs	Ministry of Housing, Spatial; Planning and the Environment	23 February 2010 – 14 October 2010	Minister of Defence	Christian Union

=== First Rutte cabinet ===
Minister		Title	Portfolio	Ministry	Term of office	Other function(s)	Party
Gerd Leers	Gerd Leers (born 1951)	Minister for Immigration and Asylum Affairs	• Immigration • Asylum Affairs • Minority Affairs	Ministry of the Interior and Kingdom Relations	14 October 2010 – 16 December 2011		Christian Democratic Appeal
Gerd Leers	Gerd Leers (born 1951)	Minister for Immigration and Asylum Affairs	• Integration • Immigration • Asylum Affairs • Minority Affairs	Ministry of the Interior and Kingdom Relations	16 December 2011 – 5 November 2012		Christian Democratic Appeal

=== Second Rutte cabinet ===
Minister		Title	Portfolio	Ministry	Term of office	Other function(s)	Party
Stef Blok	Stef Blok (born 1964)	Minister for Housing and the Central Government Sector	• Central Government Affairs • Government Real Estate • Urban Planning • Public Housing	Ministry of the Interior and Kingdom Relations	5 November 2012 – 27 January 2017^{[Appt]}	Ad interim Minister of Security and Justice (10 Mar 2015 – 20 Mar 2015)	People's Party for Freedom and Democracy
Stef Blok	Stef Blok (born 1964)	Minister for Housing and the Central Government Sector	• Central Government Affairs • Government Real Estate • Urban Planning • Public Housing	Ministry of the Interior and Kingdom Relations	5 November 2012 – 27 January 2017^{[Appt]}	Ad interim Minister of the Interior and Kingdom Relations (29 Jun 2016 – 16 Sep 2016)	People's Party for Freedom and Democracy
Lilianne Ploumen	Lilianne Ploumen (born 1962)	Minister for Foreign Trade and Development Cooperation	• International Trade • Export Promotion • International Development • Development Aid • International Environmental Policies	Ministry of Foreign Affairs	5 November 2012 – 26 October 2017		Labour Party

=== Third Rutte cabinet ===
Minister		Title	Portfolio	Ministry	Term of office	Other function(s)	Party
Sigrid Kaag	Sigrid Kaag (born 1961)	Minister for Foreign Trade and Development Cooperation	• International Trade • Export Promotion • International Development • Development Aid • International Environmental Policies	Ministry of Foreign Affairs	26 October 2017 – 10 August 2021^{[Appt]}	Ad interim Minister of Foreign Affairs (13 Feb 2018 – 7 Mar 2018) (25 May 2021 – 10 Aug 2021)	Democrats 66
Tom de Bruijn	Tom de Bruijn (born 1948)	Minister for Foreign Trade and Development Cooperation	• International Trade • Export Promotion • International Development • Development Aid • International Environmental Policies	Ministry of Foreign Affairs	10 August 2021 – 10 January 2022	Ad interim Minister of Foreign Affairs (17 Sep 2021 – 24 Sep 2021)	Democrats 66
Sander Dekker	Sander Dekker (born 1975)	Minister for Legal Protection	• Public Prosecution Service • Privacy Policy • Administrative Law • Family Law • Youth Justice • International Law • Prison Administration • Gambling Policy • Copyright Law • Rehabilitation • Prevention • Debt Management	Ministry of Justice and Security	26 October 2017 – 10 January 2022		People's Party for Freedom and Democracy
Ank Bijleveld	Ank Bijleveld (born 1962)	Acting; Minister for Intelligence	• Intelligence and Security Service	Ministry of the Interior and Kingdom Relations	1 November 2019 – 14 April 2020	Minister of Defence (26 Oct 2017 – 17 Sep 2021)	Christian Democratic Appeal
Bruno Bruins	Bruno Bruins (born 1963)	Minister for Medical Care	• Social Services • Provincial Healthcare • Local Healthcare • Biotechnology Policy • Medical Ethics Policy • Drug Policy • Sport • Coronavirus Management (Bruins only)	Ministry of Health, Welfare and Sport	26 October 2017 – 19 March 2020^{[Res]}		People's Party for Freedom and Democracy
Martin van Rijn	Martin van Rijn (born 1956)	Minister for Medical Care	• Social Services • Provincial Healthcare • Local Healthcare • Biotechnology Policy • Medical Ethics Policy • Drug Policy • Sport • Coronavirus Management (Bruins only)	Ministry of Health, Welfare and Sport	23 March 2020 – 9 July 2020		Independent (Labour Party)
Tamara van Ark	Tamara van Ark (born 1974)	Minister for Medical Care	• Social Services • Provincial Healthcare • Local Healthcare • Biotechnology Policy • Medical Ethics Policy • Drug Policy • Sport • Coronavirus Management (Bruins only)	Ministry of Health, Welfare and Sport	9 July 2020 – 3 September 2021^{[Res]}		People's Party for Freedom and Democracy
Arie Slob	Arie Slob (born 1961)	Minister for Primary and Secondary Education and Media Affairs	• Primary Education • Secondary Education • Special Education • Preschool • Teacher Policy • Media Affairs	Ministry of Education, Culture and Science	26 October 2017 – 10 January 2022		Christian Union
Stientje van Veldhoven	Stientje van Veldhoven (born 1973)	Acting; Minister for Environmental; Policy and Housing	• Environmental Policy • Central Government Affairs • Government Real Estate • Urban Planning • Public Housing	Ministry of the Interior and Kingdom Relations	1 November 2019 – 14 April 2020		Democrats 66

=== Fourth Rutte cabinet ===
Fourth Rutte cabinet
Minister	Title	Portfolio	Ministry	Term of office	Other function(s)	Party
Rob Jetten (born 1987)	Minister for Climate and Energy		Ministry of Economic Affairs and Climate	10 January 2022 – 2 July 2024	Deputy Prime Minister (8 Jan 2024 – 2 Jul 2024) Ad interim Minister of Finance (8 Jan 2024 – 10 Jan 2024)	Democrats 66
Carola Schouten (born 1977)	Minister for Poverty Policy, Participation, and Pensions		Ministry of Social Affairs and Employment	10 January 2022 – 2 July 2024	Deputy Prime Minister (10 Jan 2022 – 2 Jul 2024) Ad interim Minister of Agriculture, Nature and Food Quality (6 Sept 2022 – 3 Oct 2022)	Christian Union
Liesje Schreinemacher (born 1983)	Minister for Foreign Trade and Development Aid		Ministry of Foreign Affairs	10 January 2022 – 4 December 2023	Ad Interim Minister of Foreign Affairs (1 Sept 2023 – 5 Sept 2023)	People's Party for Freedom and Democracy
Geoffrey van Leeuwen (born 1971)	Minister for Foreign Trade and Development Aid		Ministry of Foreign Affairs	4 December 2023 – 15 April 2024		People's Party for Freedom and Democracy
Liesje Schreinemacher (born 1983)	Minister for Foreign Trade and Development Aid		Ministry of Foreign Affairs	15 April 2024 – 2 July 2024		People's Party for Freedom and Democracy
Franc Weerwind (born 1964)	Minister for Legal Protection		Ministry of Justice and Security	10 January 2022 – 2 July 2024		Democrats 66
Conny Helder (born 1958)	Minister for Long-Term Care and Sport		Ministry of Health, Welfare and Sport	10 January 2022 – 2 July 2024	Ad interim Minister of Health, Welfare and Sport (10 Jan 2024 – 2 July 2024)	People's Party for Freedom and Democracy
Hugo de Jonge (born 1977)	Minister for Housing and Spatial Planning		Ministry of Internal Affairs and Kingdom Relations	10 January 2022 – 2 July 2024	Ad interim Minister of Internal Affairs and Kingdom Relations (5 Sept 2023 – 2 July 2024)	Christian Democratic Appeal
Christianne van der Wal (born 1973)	Minister for Nature and Nitrogen		Ministry of Agriculture, Nature and Food Quality	10 January 2022 – 2 July 2024		People's Party for Freedom and Democracy
Dennis Wiersma (born 1986)	Minister for Primary and Secondary Education		Ministry of Education, Culture and Science	10 January 2022 – 23 June 2023 ^{[Res]}		People's Party for Freedom and Democracy
Mariëlle Paul (born 1966)	Minister for Primary and Secondary Education		Ministry of Education, Culture and Science	23 June 2023 – 2 July 2024		People's Party for Freedom and Democracy
Pia Dijkstra (born 1954)	Minister for Medical Care		Ministry of Health, Welfare and Sport	10 January 2022 – 2 July 2024		Democrats 66

=== Schoof cabinet ===
Schoof cabinet
Minister		Title	Portfolio	Ministry	Term of office	Other function(s)	Party
Reinette Klever	Reinette Klever (born 1967)	Minister for Foreign Trade and Development Aid	• International Trade • Development Aid	Ministry of Foreign Affairs	2 July 2024 – June 2025		Party for Freedom

^{Resigned}
^{Appointment: Jaap Burger appointed Minister of the Interior; Eelco van Kleffens appointed Minister for Foreign Policy; Herman van Roijen and Sigrid Kaag appointed Minister of Foreign Affairs; Pierre Lardinois appointed European Commissioner; Stef Blok appointed Minister of Security and Justice.}
^{Died in office.}
^{Medical leave of absence.}

== See also ==
- Minister for Foreign Trade and Development Cooperation
