= List of rectores magnifici of the Eindhoven University of Technology =

A rector of a Dutch university is called a rector magnificus. The following people have been rector magnificus of the Eindhoven University of Technology or its predecessor, the Technische Hogeschool Eindhoven (THE):

Period	Rector magnificus	Image
1956–1961	H.B. Dorgelo	
1961–1968	K. Posthumus	
1968–1971	A.A.Th.M. van Trier	
1971–1976	G. Vossers	
1976–1979	P. van der Leeden	
1979–1982	J. Erkelens	
1982–1985	S.T.M. Ackermans	
1985–1989	F.N. Hooge	
1989–1991	M. Tels	
1991–1996	J. H. van Lint	
1996–2001	M. Rem	
2001–2005	R.A. van Santen	
2005–2015	C.J. van Duijn	
2015 – 2023	F.P.T. Baaijens	FrankBaaijens2017
2023 -	S.K. Lenaerts	
