= Louis Stuyt =

Dutch politician

His Excellency Louis Stuyt
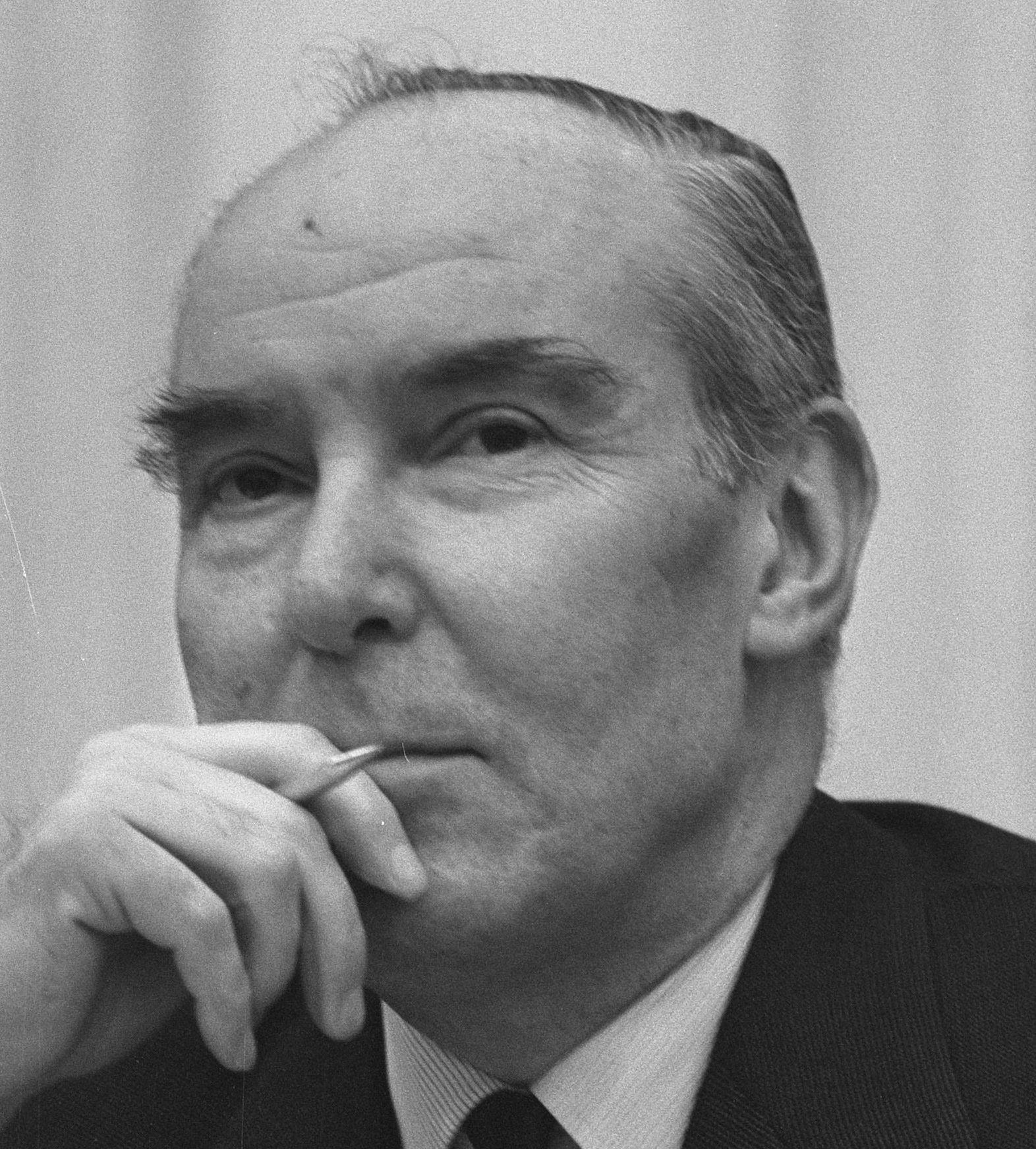
- Louis Stuyt in 1973

Extraordinary Member of the Council of State
- In office 2 June 1980 – 1 July 1984
- Vice President: Marinus Ruppert (1980); Willem Scholten (1980–1984)

Minister of Health and Environment
- In office 6 July 1971 – 11 May 1973
- Prime Minister: Barend Biesheuvel
- Preceded by: Bauke Roolvink as Minister of Social; Affairs and Health
- Succeeded by: Irene Vorrink

Personal details
- Born: Lodewijk Benedictus Johannes Stuijt; 16 June 1914 Amsterdam, Netherlands
- Died: 30 October 2000 (aged 86) The Hague, Netherlands
- Party: Christian Democratic Appeal (from 1980)
- Other political affiliations: Catholic People's Party (1971–1980)
- Education: University of Amsterdam (Bachelor of Medical Sciences, Master of Medicine, Doctor of Medicine, Doctor of Philosophy)
- Occupation: Politician · Physician · Medical researcher

Lodewijk Benedictus Johannes "Louis" Stuyt (16 June 1914 – 30 October 2000) was a Dutch politician of the defunct Catholic People's Party (KVP) now merged into the Christian Democratic Appeal (CDA) and physician.

== Decorations ==
Honours
| Ribbon bar | Honour | Country | Date | Comment |
| | Officer of the Order of Orange-Nassau | Netherlands | 8 June 1973 | |

Political offices
| Preceded by Bauke Roolvink as Minister of Social; Affairs and Health | Minister of Health and Environment; 1971–1973 | Succeeded by Irene Vorrink |
