= First Van Agt cabinet =

Dutch government cabinet, 1977 to 1981

First Van Agt cabinet Van Agt–Wiegel cabinet
- Cabinet of the Netherlands

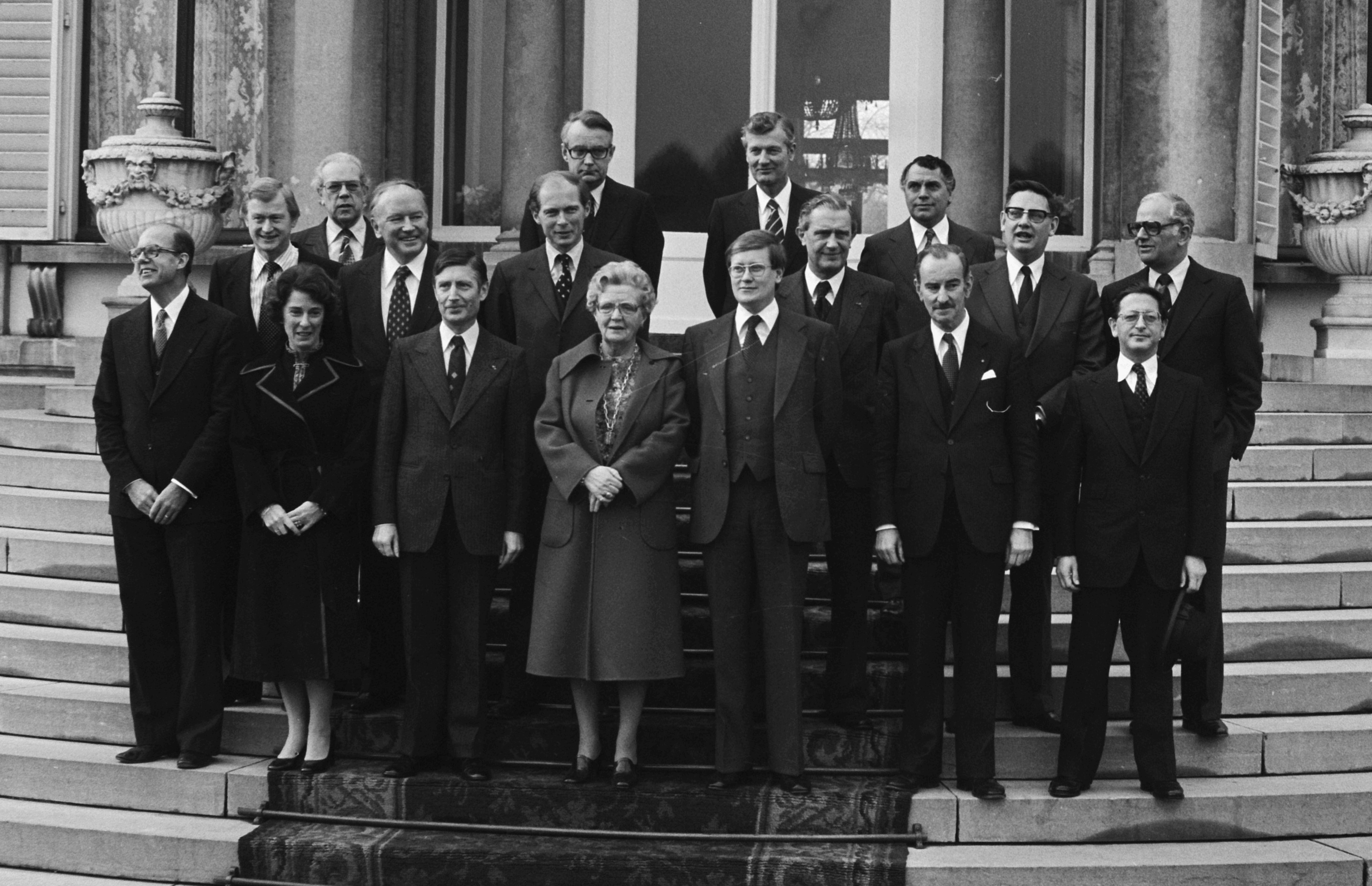
- Installation of the cabinet by Queen Juliana at Soestdijk Palace on 19 December 1977
- Date formed: 19 December 1977
- Date dissolved: 11 September 1981; 3 years, 266 days in office (Demissionary from 26 May 1981)

People and organisations
- Monarch: Queen Juliana (1977–1980); Queen Beatrix (1980–1981)
- Prime Minister: Dries van Agt
- Deputy Prime Minister: Hans Wiegel
- No. of ministers: 17
- Ministers removed: 5
- Total no. of members: 21
- Member party: Christian Democratic Appeal (CDA); People's Party for Freedom and Democracy (VVD)
- Status in legislature: Centre-right; Majority government

History
- Election: 1977 election
- Outgoing election: 1981 election
- Legislature terms: 1977–1981
- Incoming formation: 1977 formation
- Outgoing formation: 1981 formation
- Predecessor: Den Uyl cabinet
- Successor: Second Van Agt cabinet

The first Van Agt cabinet, also called the Van Agt–Wiegel cabinet, was the executive branch of the Dutch Government from 19 December 1977 until 11 September 1981. The cabinet was formed by the christian-democratic Christian Democratic Appeal (CDA) and the conservative-liberal People's Party for Freedom and Democracy (VVD) after the election of 1977. The cabinet was a centre-right coalition and had a slim majority in the House of Representatives with Christian Democratic Leader Dries van Agt serving as Prime Minister. Liberal Leader Hans Wiegel served as Deputy Prime Minister and Minister of the Interior.

The cabinet served in the final years of the radical 1970s and the early years of the economic expansion of the 1980s. Domestically it had to deal with the last days of the counterculture, the abdication of Queen Juliana and the installation of Queen Beatrix, and a growing inflation following the recession in the 1980s; but it was able to implement several major social reforms to the public sector and civil reforms and stimulating deregulation and privatization. Internationally it had to deal with the 1979 oil crisis and the fallout of the increasing international stand against Apartheid in South Africa. The cabinet suffered several major internal and external conflicts including multiple cabinet resignations, including an informal caucus of several Christian Democrats in the House of Representatives that only supported the cabinet in a confidence and supply construction, but it was able to complete its entire term and was succeeded by the Second Van Agt cabinet following the election of 1981.

== Formation ==
Composition of the cabinet in relation to the rest of the legislature

After the 1977 general election the Labour Party (PvdA) of incumbent Prime Minister Joop den Uyl was the winner of the election which won ten new seats and had now a total of 53 seats. The People's Party for Freedom and Democracy (VVD) of Hans Wiegel won six seats and had now 28 seats. The Anti-Revolutionary Party (ARP), Catholic People's Party (KVP) and the Christian Historical Union (CHU) participated for the first time as the combined party Christian Democratic Appeal (CDA) with Dries van Agt as its new Leader. This electoral fusion resulted in one new seat and now had a total of 49 seats in the House of Representatives. A long negotiation between the Labour Party and Christian Democratic Appeal followed. Both parties had come out of the elections as equal partners. The negotiations were troubled by the personal animosity between incumbent Prime Minister and Leader of the Labour Party Joop den Uyl and the Leader of the Christian Democratic Appeal Dries van Agt. Van Agt who served as Deputy Prime Minister under Den Uyl his cabinet had a bad working relationship. In the end Van Agt found that the demands of the Den Uyl were too great and instead he formed a coalition with the People's Party for Freedom and Democracy.

== Term ==
The cabinet had to deal with a major economic depression, but refused to cut government spending due to fierce left-wing opposition in the parliament, which had nearly half of the seats. Many left-wing demonstrations were held on the street against the government. Notorious were the harsh demonstrations in Amsterdam during the crowning of Queen Beatrix and the squatting riots. There was a sharp increase in unemployment and the government was seen to have created too much debt.

=== Changes ===
On 5 March 1978 Minister of Defence Roelof Kruisinga (CHU) resigned in-protest after the cabinet decided to not publicly condemn the United States for further developing the Neutron bomb. Minister for Development Cooperation Jan de Koning (ARP) served as acting Minister of Defence until 8 March 1978 when Member of the Council of State Willem Scholten (CHU) was appointed as his successor.

On 1 April 1979 Minister for Science Policy Rinus Peijnenburg (KVP) unexpectedly died from a heart attack at the age of 51. Minister of Health and Environment Leendert Ginjaar (VVD) served as acting Minister for Science Policy until 3 May 1979 when Ton van Trier, who until then had been working as a professor of electrical engineering at the Eindhoven University of Technology was installed as his successor. Ton van Trier an Independent Christian Democrat joined the Catholic People's Party that same month.

On 22 February 1980, Minister of Finance Frans Andriessen (KVP) resigned after disagreeing with the cabinet's decision to not implement a stronger austerity policy. State Secretary for Finance Ad Nooteboom (CHU) declared his solidarity with Frans Andriessen and also resigned that same day. Minister of Economic Affairs Gijs van Aardenne (VVD) served as acting Minister of Finance until 5 March 1980 when Minister of Agriculture and Fisheries Fons van der Stee (KVP) was appointed as Minister of Finance. That same day Member of the House of Representatives Gerrit Braks (KVP) was installed as Minister of Agriculture and Fisheries. On 16 April 1980 Member of the House of Representatives Marius van Amelsvoort (KVP) was appointed as State Secretary for Finance.

On 25 August 1980, Minister of Defence Willem Scholten (CHU) resigned after he was appointed Vice-President of the Council of State. That same day former naval officer Pieter de Geus (CHU), who until then had been working as a top official at the Ministry of Defence was appointed as his successor.

On 1 September 1981, ten days before the new cabinet took office Minister for Housing and Spatial Planning Pieter Beelaerts van Blokland (CDA) resigned after he had been appointed Mayor of Apeldoorn. Minister of Transport and Water Management Dany Tuijnman (VVD) took over the position until the new cabinet was installed on 11 September 1981.

== Cabinet members ==
Ministers		Title/Ministry/Portfolio(s)			Term of office	Party
Dries van Agt	Dries van Agt (1931–2024)	Prime Minister	General Affairs		19 December 1977 – 4 November 1982^{[Continued]}	Catholic; People's Party
Dries van Agt	Dries van Agt (1931–2024)	Prime Minister	General Affairs		19 December 1977 – 4 November 1982^{[Continued]}	Christian; Democratic Appeal
Hans Wiegel	Hans Wiegel (1941–2025)	Deputy Prime; Minister	Interior		19 December 1977 – 11 September 1981	People's Party for Freedom and Democracy
Hans Wiegel	Hans Wiegel (1941–2025)	Minister	Interior		19 December 1977 – 11 September 1981	People's Party for Freedom and Democracy
Chris van der Klaauw	Chris van der Klaauw (1924–2005)	Minister	Foreign Affairs		19 December 1977 – 11 September 1981	People's Party for Freedom and Democracy
Frans Andriessen	Frans; Andriessen (1929–2019)	Minister	Finance		19 December 1977 – 22 February 1980^{[Res]}	Catholic; People's Party
Gijs van Aardenne	Gijs van Aardenne (1930–1995)	Minister	Finance		22 February 1980 – 5 March 1980^{[Ad Interim]}	People's Party for Freedom and Democracy
Fons van der Stee	Fons van der Stee (1928–1999)	Minister	Finance		5 March 1980 – 4 November 1982^{[Continued]}	Catholic; People's Party
Fons van der Stee	Fons van der Stee (1928–1999)	Minister	Finance		5 March 1980 – 4 November 1982^{[Continued]}	Christian; Democratic Appeal
Job de Ruiter	Job de Ruiter (1930–2015)	Minister	Justice		19 December 1977 – 4 November 1982^{[Continued]}	Anti-Revolutionary; Party
Job de Ruiter	Job de Ruiter (1930–2015)	Minister	Justice		19 December 1977 – 4 November 1982^{[Continued]}	Christian; Democratic Appeal
Gijs van Aardenne	Gijs van Aardenne (1930–1995)	Minister	Economic Affairs		19 December 1977 – 11 September 1981	People's Party for Freedom and Democracy
Roelof Kruisinga	Roelof; Kruisinga (1922–2012)	Minister	Defence		19 December 1977 – 4 March 1978^{[Res]}	Christian; Historical Union
Jan de Koning	Jan de Koning (1926–1994)	Minister	Defence		4 March 1978 – 8 March 1978^{[Ad Interim]}	Anti-Revolutionary; Party
Willem Scholten	Willem Scholten (1927–2005)	Minister	Defence		8 March 1978 – 25 August 1980^{[App]}	Christian; Historical Union
Pieter de Geus	Pieter de Geus (1929–2004)	Minister	Defence		25 August 1980 – 11 September 1981	Christian; Historical Union
Pieter de Geus	Pieter de Geus (1929–2004)	Minister	Defence		25 August 1980 – 11 September 1981	Christian; Democratic Appeal
Leendert Ginjaar	Leendert; Ginjaar (1928–2003)	Minister	Health and Environment		19 December 1977 – 11 September 1981	People's Party for Freedom and Democracy
Wil Albeda	Wil Albeda (1925–2014)	Minister	Social Affairs		19 December 1977 – 11 September 1981	Anti-Revolutionary; Party
Wil Albeda	Wil Albeda (1925–2014)	Minister	Social Affairs		19 December 1977 – 11 September 1981	Christian; Democratic Appeal
Arie Pais	Arie Pais (1930–2022)	Minister	Education and Sciences		19 December 1977 – 11 September 1981	People's Party for Freedom and Democracy
Dany Tuijnman	Dany Tuijnman (1915–1992)	Minister	Transport and Water Management		19 December 1977 – 11 September 1981	People's Party for Freedom and Democracy
Pieter Beelaerts van Blokland	Jonkheer; Pieter Beelaerts van Blokland (1932–2021)	Minister	Housing and Spatial Planning		19 December 1977 – 1 September 1981^{[App]}	Christian; Historical Union
Pieter Beelaerts van Blokland	Jonkheer; Pieter Beelaerts van Blokland (1932–2021)	Minister	Housing and Spatial Planning		19 December 1977 – 1 September 1981^{[App]}	Christian; Democratic Appeal
Dany Tuijnman	Dany Tuijnman (1915–1992)	Minister	Housing and Spatial Planning		1 September 1981 – 11 September 1981^{[Ad Interim]}	People's Party for Freedom and Democracy
Fons van der Stee	Fons van der Stee (1928–1999)	Minister	Agriculture and Fisheries		1 November 1973 – 5 March 1980^{[Retained]} ^{[App]}	Catholic; People's Party
Gerrit Brokx	Gerrit Braks (1933–2017)	Minister	Agriculture and Fisheries		5 March 1980 – 11 September 1981	Catholic; People's Party
Gerrit Brokx	Gerrit Braks (1933–2017)	Minister	Agriculture and Fisheries		5 March 1980 – 11 September 1981	Christian; Democratic Appeal
Til Gardeniers-Berendsen	Til Gardeniers- Berendsen (1925–2019)	Minister	Culture, Recreation and Social Work		19 December 1977 – 11 September 1981	Catholic; People's Party
Til Gardeniers-Berendsen	Til Gardeniers- Berendsen (1925–2019)	Minister	Culture, Recreation and Social Work		19 December 1977 – 11 September 1981	Christian; Democratic Appeal
Ministers without portfolio		Title/Ministry/Portfolio(s)			Term of office	Party
Fons van der Stee	Fons van der Stee (1928–1999)	Minister	Interior	• Netherlands; Antilles Affairs	19 December 1977 – 11 September 1981	Catholic; People's Party
Fons van der Stee	Fons van der Stee (1928–1999)	Minister	Interior	• Netherlands; Antilles Affairs	19 December 1977 – 11 September 1981	Christian; Democratic Appeal
Jan de Koning	Jan de Koning (1926–1994)	Minister	Foreign Affairs	• Development; Cooperation	19 December 1977 – 11 September 1981	Anti-Revolutionary; Party
Jan de Koning	Jan de Koning (1926–1994)	Minister	Foreign Affairs	• Development; Cooperation	19 December 1977 – 11 September 1981	Christian; Democratic Appeal
Rinus Peijnenburg	Rinus; Peijnenburg (1928–1979)	Minister	Education and Sciences	• Science Policy	19 December 1977 – 1 April 1979^{[Died]}	Catholic; People's Party
Leendert Ginjaar	Leendert; Ginjaar (1928–2003)	Minister	Education and Sciences	• Science Policy	1 April 1979 – 3 May 1979^{[Acting]}	People's Party for Freedom and Democracy
Ton van Trier	Ton van Trier (1926–1983)	Minister	Education and Sciences	• Science Policy	3 May 1979 – 11 September 1981	Independent; Christian Democratic; Catholic
Ton van Trier	Ton van Trier (1926–1983)	Minister	Education and Sciences	• Science Policy	3 May 1979 – 11 September 1981	Catholic; People's Party
Ton van Trier	Ton van Trier (1926–1983)	Minister	Education and Sciences	• Science Policy	3 May 1979 – 11 September 1981	Christian; Democratic Appeal
State Secretaries		Title/Ministry/Portfolio(s)			Term of office	Party
Henk Koning	Henk Koning (1933–2016)	State Secretary	Interior	• Municipalities • civil service	28 December 1977 – 11 September 1981	People's Party for Freedom and Democracy
Durk van der Mei	Durk van der Mei (1924–2018)	State Secretary	Foreign Affairs	• European Union • Benelux	28 December 1977 – 11 September 1981	Christian; Historical Union
Durk van der Mei	Durk van der Mei (1924–2018)	State Secretary	Foreign Affairs	• European Union • Benelux	28 December 1977 – 11 September 1981	Christian; Democratic Appeal
Ad Nooteboom	Ad Nooteboom (1928–2023)	State Secretary	Finance	• Fiscal Policy • Tax and Customs • Governmental; Budget	28 December 1977 – 22 February 1980^{[Res]}	Christian; Historical Union
Marius van Amelsvoort	Marius van Amelsvoort (1930–2006)	State Secretary	Finance	• Fiscal Policy • Tax and Customs • Governmental; Budget	16 April 1980 – 11 September 1981	Catholic; People's Party
Marius van Amelsvoort	Marius van Amelsvoort (1930–2006)	State Secretary	Finance	• Fiscal Policy • Tax and Customs • Governmental; Budget	16 April 1980 – 11 September 1981	Christian; Democratic Appeal
Bert Haars	Bert Haars (1913–1997)	State Secretary	Justice	• Immigration and Asylum • Judicial Reform • Youth Justice • Penitentiaries	28 December 1977 – 11 September 1981	Christian; Historical Union
Bert Haars	Bert Haars (1913–1997)	State Secretary	Justice	• Immigration and Asylum • Judicial Reform • Youth Justice • Penitentiaries	28 December 1977 – 11 September 1981	Christian; Democratic Appeal
Ted Hazekamp	Ted Hazekamp (1926–1987)	State Secretary	Economic Affairs	• Small and Medium-sized; Businesses • Regional; Development • Consumer; Protection	11 May 1973 – 11 September 1981^{[Retained]}	Catholic; People's Party
Ted Hazekamp	Ted Hazekamp (1926–1987)	State Secretary	Economic Affairs	• Small and Medium-sized; Businesses • Regional; Development • Consumer; Protection	11 May 1973 – 11 September 1981^{[Retained]}	Christian; Democratic Appeal
Has Beyen	Has Beyen (1923–2002)	State Secretary	Economic Affairs	• Trade and Export	9 January 1978 – 11 September 1981	People's Party for Freedom and Democracy
Cees van Lent	Cees van Lent (1922–2000)	State Secretary	Defence	• Human; Resources	11 March 1974 – 11 September 1981^{[Retained]}	Catholic; People's Party
Cees van Lent	Cees van Lent (1922–2000)	State Secretary	Defence	• Human; Resources	11 March 1974 – 11 September 1981^{[Retained]}	Christian; Democratic Appeal
Wim van Eekelen	Wim van Eekelen (1931–2025)	State Secretary	Defence	• Equipment • Justice	20 January 1978 – 11 September 1981	People's Party for Freedom and Democracy
Els Veder-Smit	Els Veder-Smit (1921–2020)	State Secretary	Health and Environment	• Primary; Healthcare • Elderly Care • Disability Policy • Medical Ethics • Food Policy	3 January 1978 – 11 September 1981	People's Party for Freedom and Democracy
Louw de Graaf	Louw de Graaf (1930–2020)	State Secretary	Social Affairs	• Social Security • Occupational; Safety	28 December 1977 – 11 September 1981	Anti-Revolutionary; Party
Louw de Graaf	Louw de Graaf (1930–2020)	State Secretary	Social Affairs	• Social Security • Occupational; Safety	28 December 1977 – 11 September 1981	Christian; Democratic Appeal
Klaas de Jong Ozn.	Klaas de Jong Ozn. (1926–2011)	State Secretary	Education and Sciences	• Secondary; Education	1 September 1975 – 11 September 1981^{[Retained]}	Anti-Revolutionary; Party
Klaas de Jong Ozn.	Klaas de Jong Ozn. (1926–2011)	State Secretary	Education and Sciences	• Secondary; Education	1 September 1975 – 11 September 1981^{[Retained]}	Christian; Democratic Appeal
Ad Hermes	Ad Hermes (1929–2002)	State Secretary	Education and Sciences	• Primary; Education	9 January 1978 – 4 November 1982^{[Continued]}	Catholic; People's Party
Ad Hermes	Ad Hermes (1929–2002)	State Secretary	Education and Sciences	• Primary; Education	9 January 1978 – 4 November 1982^{[Continued]}	Christian; Democratic Appeal
Neelie Kroes	Neelie Kroes (born 1941)	State Secretary	Transport and Water Management	• Public; Infrastructure • Public; Transport • Rail Transport • Water; Management • Postal Service • Weather; Forecasting	28 December 1977 – 11 September 1981	People's Party for Freedom and Democracy
Gerrit Brokx	Gerrit Brokx (1933–2002)	State Secretary	Housing and Spatial Planning	• Public Housing • Urban Planning	28 December 1977 – 11 September 1981	Catholic; People's Party
Gerrit Brokx	Gerrit Brokx (1933–2002)	State Secretary	Housing and Spatial Planning	• Public Housing • Urban Planning	28 December 1977 – 11 September 1981	Christian; Democratic Appeal
Jeltien Kraaijeveld-Wouters	Jeltien; Kraaijeveld- Wouters (1932–2025)	State Secretary	Culture, Recreation and Social Work	• Unemployment • Equality • Emancipation	28 December 1977 – 9 September 1981^{[Res]}	Anti-Revolutionary; Party
Jeltien Kraaijeveld-Wouters	Jeltien; Kraaijeveld- Wouters (1932–2025)	State Secretary	Culture, Recreation and Social Work	• Unemployment • Equality • Emancipation	28 December 1977 – 9 September 1981^{[Res]}	Christian; Democratic Appeal
Gerard Wallis de Vries	Gerard Wallis de Vries (1936–2018)	State Secretary	Culture, Recreation and Social Work	• Social Services • Environmental; Policy • Nature • Media • Culture • Art • Recreation • Sport	4 January 1978 – 11 September 1981	People's Party for Freedom and Democracy

^{Resigned}
^{Retained from the previous cabinet}
^{Continued in the next cabinet}
^{Ad Interim}
^{Acting}
^{Died in Office}
^{Appointed as Vice-President of the Council of State}
^{Appointed as Minister of Finance}
^{Appointed as Mayor of Apeldoorn}
