= Hans van Mierlo =

Dutch politician (1931–2010)

His Excellency Hans van Mierlo
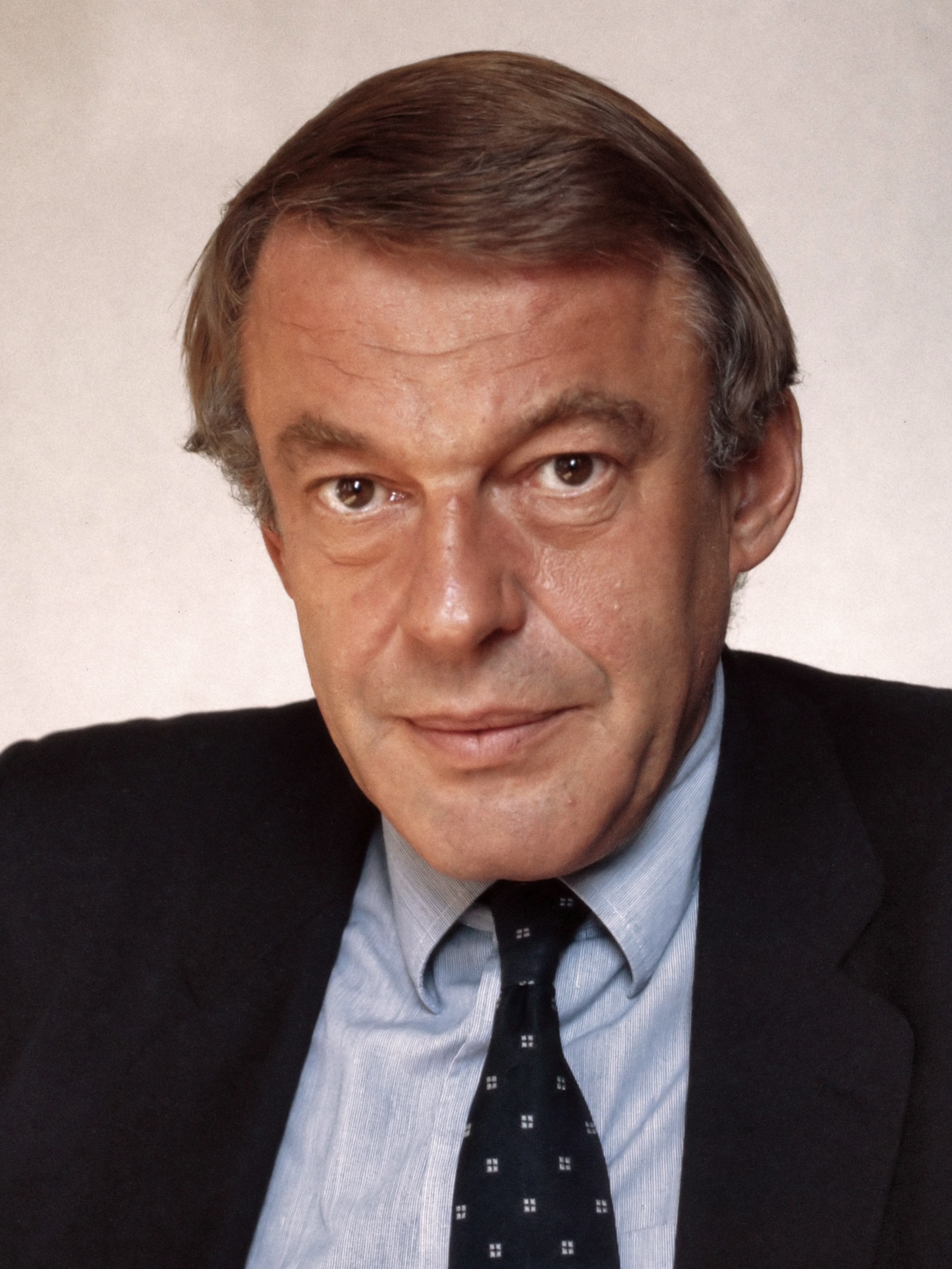
- Van Mierlo in 1981

Deputy Prime Minister of the Netherlands
- In office 22 August 1994 – 3 August 1998 Serving with Hans Dijkstal
- Prime Minister: Wim Kok
- Preceded by: Wim Kok
- Succeeded by: Annemarie Jorritsma; Els Borst

Minister of Foreign Affairs
- In office 22 August 1994 – 3 August 1998
- Prime Minister: Wim Kok
- Preceded by: Pieter Kooijmans
- Succeeded by: Jozias van Aartsen

Senator of the Netherlands
- In office 13 September 1983 – 4 June 1986

Minister of Defence
- In office 11 September 1981 – 4 November 1982
- Prime Minister: Dries van Agt
- Preceded by: Pieter de Geus
- Succeeded by: Job de Ruiter

Leader of the Democrats 66 in the House of Representatives
- In office 3 June 1986 – 22 August 1994
- Preceded by: Maarten Engwirda
- Succeeded by: Gerrit-Jan Wolffensperger
- In office 23 February 1967 – 1 September 1973
- Preceded by: Office established
- Succeeded by: Jan Terlouw

Member of the House of Representatives
- In office 19 May 1998 – 18 August 1998
- In office 3 June 1986 – 22 August 1994
- In office 23 February 1967 – 8 June 1977

Leader of the Democrats 66
- In office 25 January 1986 – 15 February 1998
- Preceded by: Maarten Engwirda
- Succeeded by: Els Borst
- In office 14 October 1966 – 1 September 1973
- Preceded by: Office established
- Succeeded by: Jan Terlouw

Chairman of the Democrats 66
- In office 14 October 1966 – 16 February 1967
- Preceded by: Office established
- Succeeded by: Gerben Ringnalda

Personal details
- Born: Henricus Antonius Franciscus Maria Oliva van Mierlo; 18 August 1931 Breda, Netherlands
- Died: 11 March 2010 (aged 78) Amsterdam, Netherlands
- Party: Democrats 66 (from 1966)
- Spouses: Anna Los (m. 1961; div. 1963) Olla van Maasdijk (m. 1964; div. 1984) Connie Palmen (m. 2009)
- Domestic partner(s): Gretta Nieuwenhuizen (1985–1986); Aafke van der Made (1987–1997); Connie Palmen (1999–2009)
- Children: 2 daughters and 1 son
- Education: Radboud University Nijmegen (LL.B., LL.M.)
- Occupation: Politician · Journalist · Editor · Author · Political pundit · Nonprofit director · Television producer
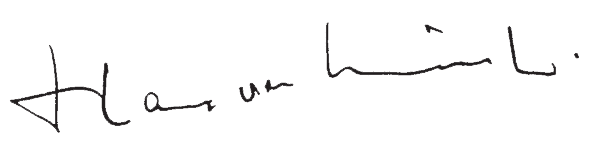
- Signature

Military service
- Allegiance: Netherlands
- Branch/service: Royal Netherlands Army
- Years of service: 1952–1954 (Conscription); 1954–1961 (Reserve)
- Rank: Sergeant
- Unit: Regiment van Heutsz

Henricus Antonius Franciscus Maria Oliva "Hans" van Mierlo (Dutch pronunciation: [ˈɦɑns fɑ ˈmiːrloː]; (Note: Van in isolation: [vɑn].) 18 August 1931 – 11 March 2010) was a Dutch politician and journalist who co-founded Democrats 66 (D66).

Van Mierlo studied Law at the Radboud University Nijmegen obtaining a Master of Laws degree and worked as a journalist and editor for the Algemeen Handelsblad from August 1960 until January 1967. In October 1966 Van Mierlo was one of the co-founders of the Democrats 66 (initially abbreviated D'66) party, and became its first party leader and lead candidate for the 1967 general election. Van Mierlo was elected to the House of Representatives and became parliamentary leader on 23 February 1967. For the 1971 and 1972 general elections Van Mierlo served again as lead candidate. On 1 September 1973 Van Mierlo unexpectedly announced he was stepping down as party leader, stating that he would not stand for the 1977 general election but would continue to serve in the House of Representatives as a frontbencher until the end of the parliamentary term.

Van Mierlo semi-retired from active politics and became active in the public sector as a non-profit director, and worked as a television producer for the VARA from January 1980 until September 1981. After the 1981 general election, Van Mierlo was appointed as Minister of Defence in the Van Agt II cabinet taking office on 11 September 1981. The cabinet fell just seven months into its term on 12 May 1982 and was replaced by the caretaker Van Agt III cabinet with Van Mierlo continuing his position and shortly thereafter announced that he would not stand for the 1982 general election. Van Mierlo continued to be active in politics and was elected to the Senate in the 1983 Senate election, serving as a frontbencher and spokesperson for foreign affairs. For the 1986 general election Van Mierlo again served as lead candidate and returned to the House of Representatives as parliamentary leader on 3 June 1986. For the 1989 and 1994 general elections Van Mierlo once again served as lead candidate, and following a successful cabinet formation with Labour Party leader Wim Kok and People's Party for Freedom and Democracy leader Frits Bolkestein formed the Kok I cabinet, with Van Mierlo appointed as Deputy Prime Minister and Minister of Foreign Affairs, taking office on 22 August 1994. In March 1997 Van Mierlo announced that he was stepping down as leader a second time but that he would stand for the 1998 general election. After a cabinet formation, Van Mierlo was asked to continue to serve in the new cabinet in a different function, but declined and returned to the House of Representatives on 19 May 1998. Shortly after the installation of the Kok II cabinet, Van Mierlo announced his retirement and resigned from the House of Representatives on 18 August 1998.

Van Mierlo retired from active politics at 67 and again became active in the public sector as a non-profit director and served as a diplomat for several economic and diplomatic delegations on behalf of the government, and continued to be active as an advocate and lobbyist for more European integration, republican issues and government reforms. Van Mierlo was known for his abilities as a skilful debater and effective negotiator. Van Mierlo was granted the honorary title of Minister of State on 24 October 1998 and continued to comment on political affairs as a statesman until his death in March 2010 from the complications of a Hepatitis C infection at the age of 78.

== Early life ==
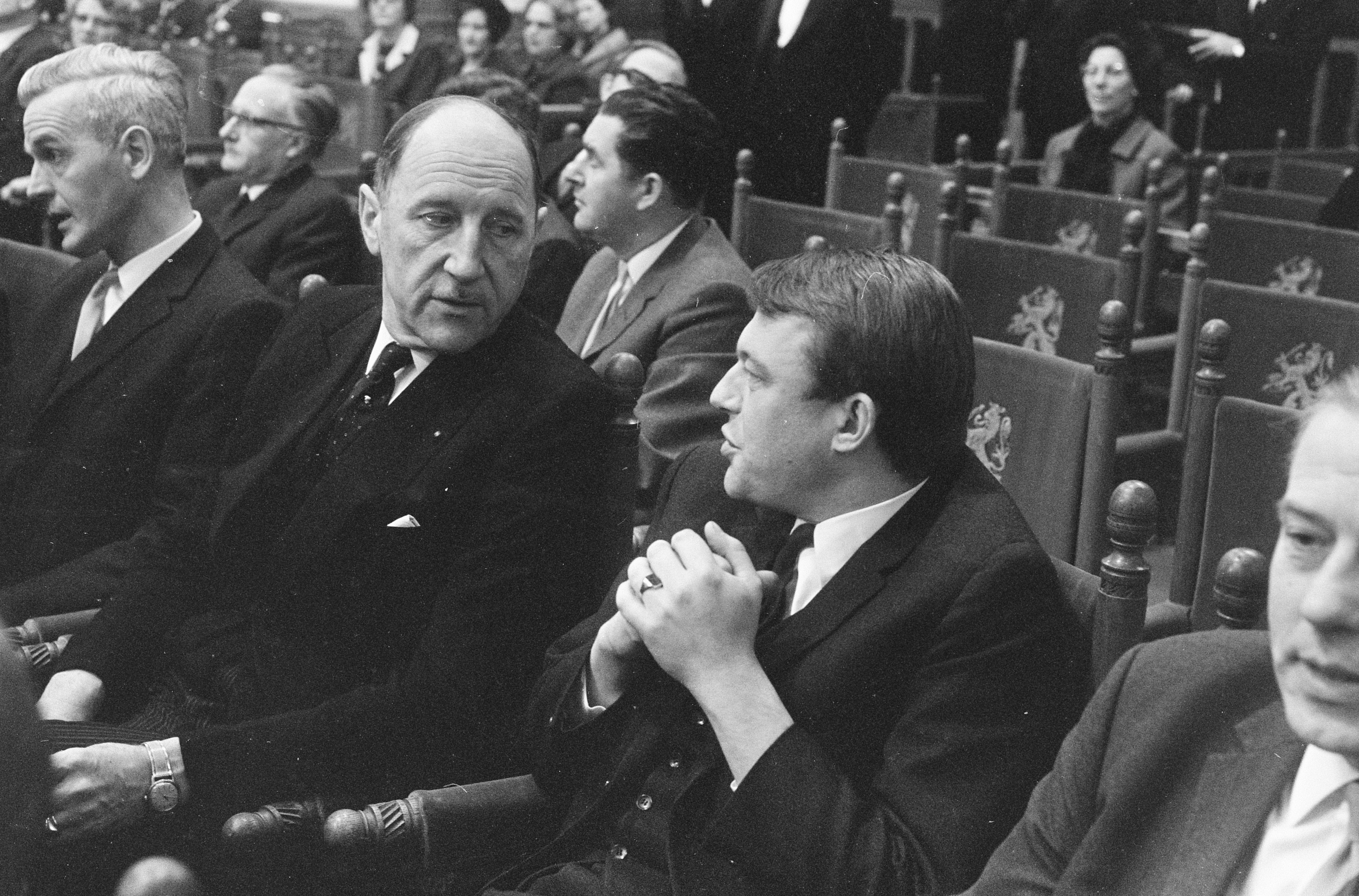
Minister of Foreign Affairs Joseph Luns and Hans van Mierlo at his inauguration in the Ridderzaal on 23 February 1967

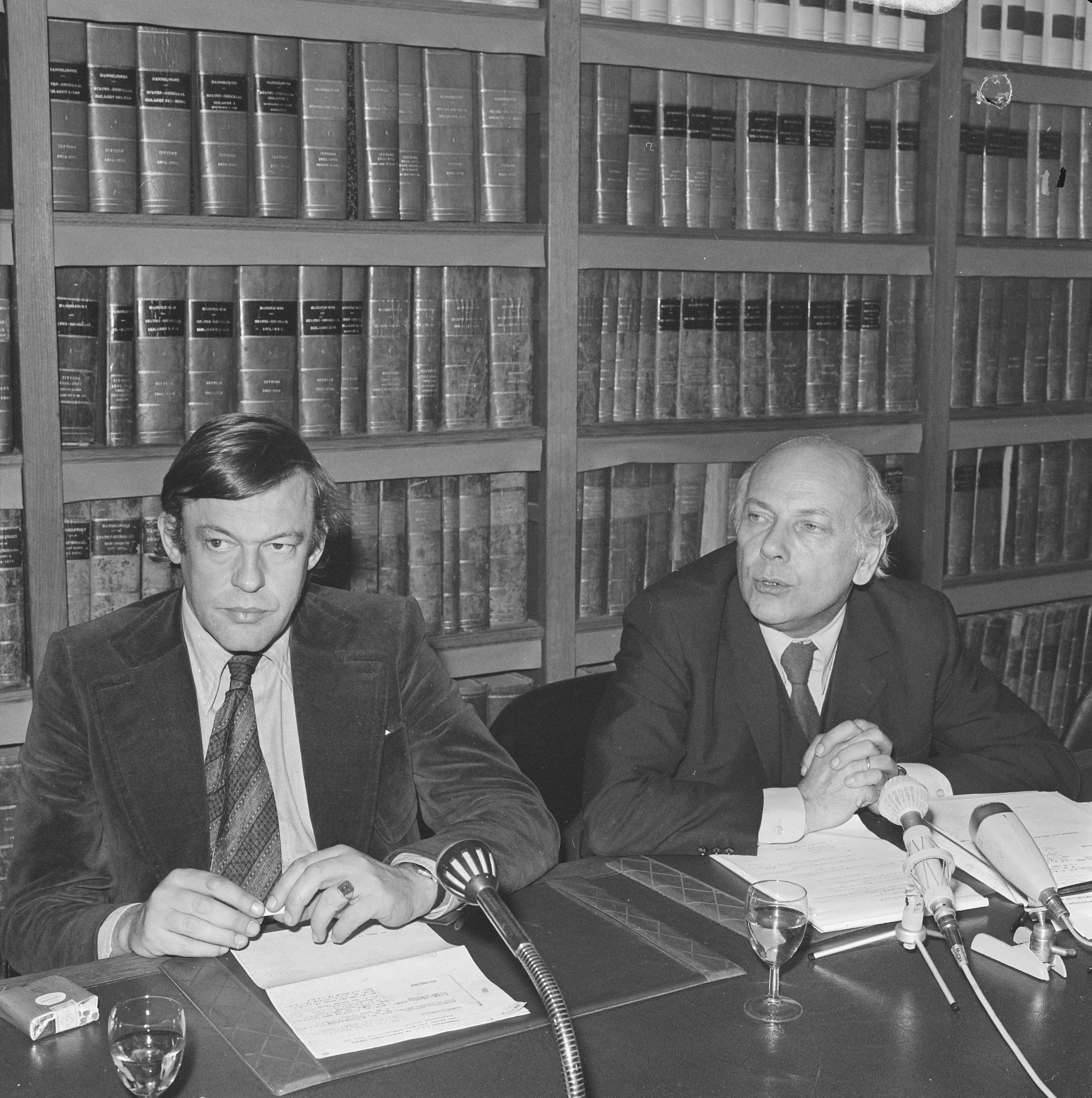
Hans van Mierlo and Joop den Uyl at a press conference in The Hague on 18 November 1972

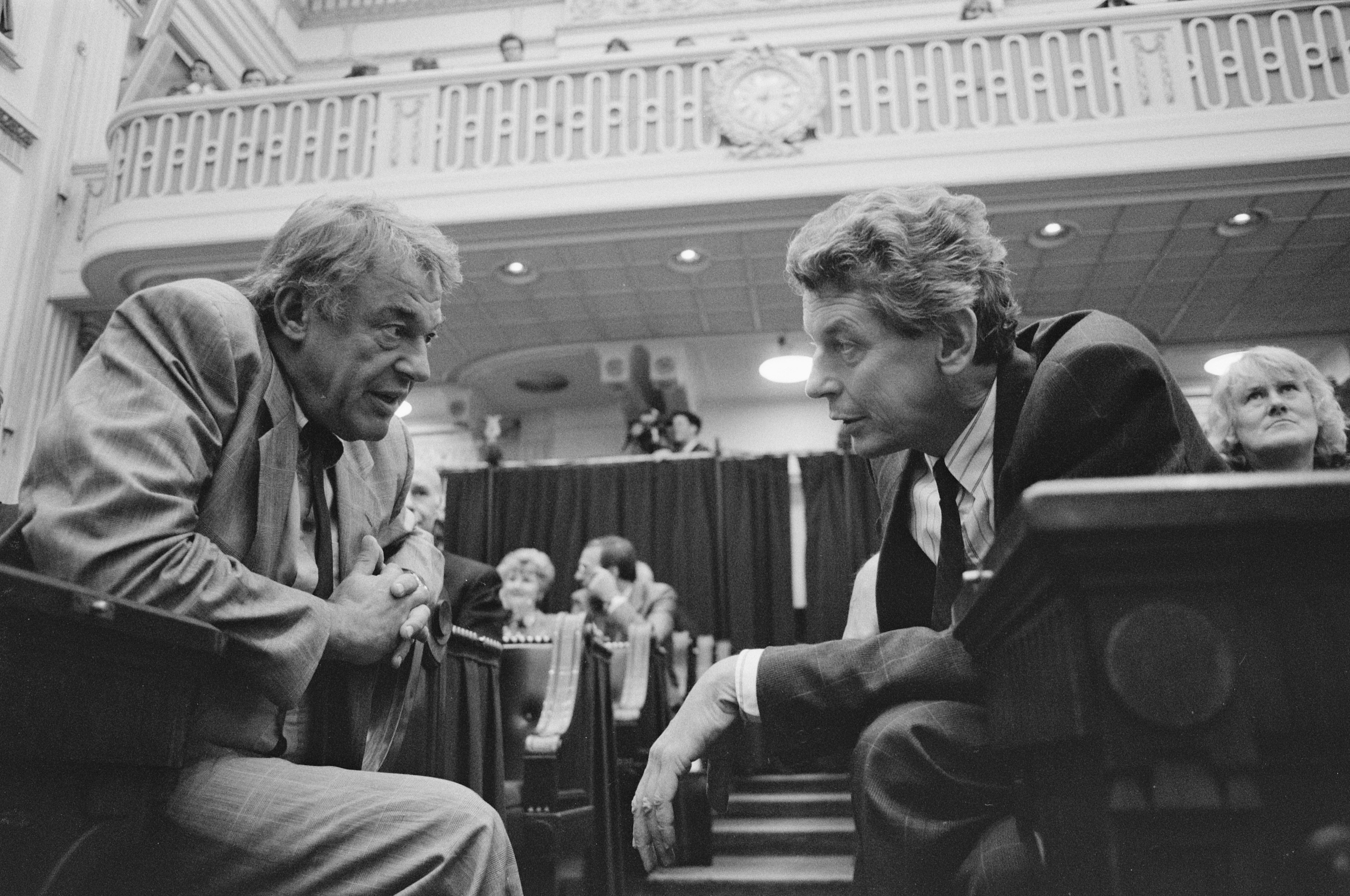
Hans van Mierlo and Wim Kok during a debate in the House of Representatives on 13 September 1989

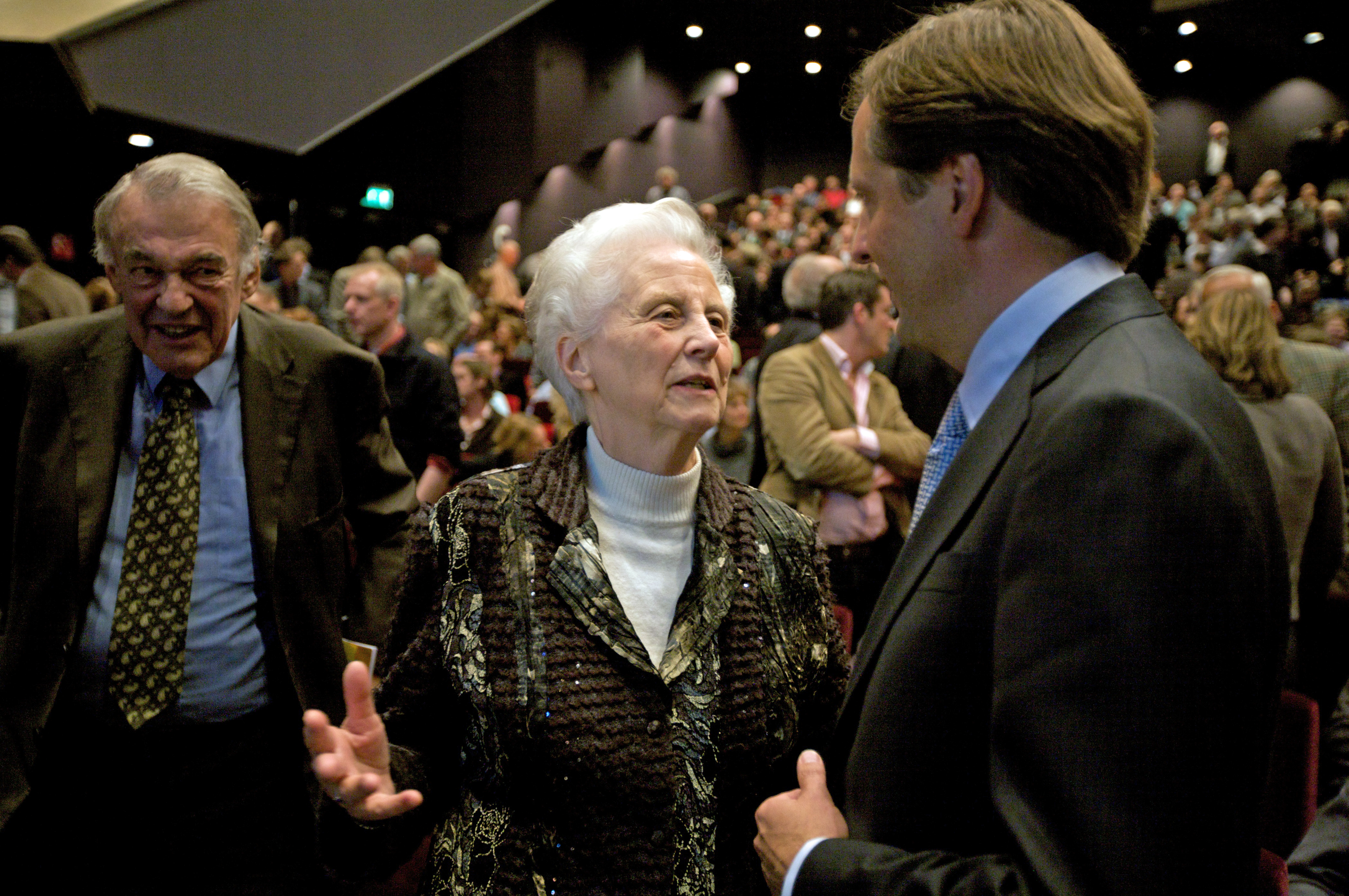
Hans van Mierlo, Els Borst and party leader Alexander Pechtold during party conference in Breda on 7 November 2009

Henricus Antonius Franciscus Maria Oliva van Mierlo was born on 18 August 1931 in Breda in the province of North Brabant in a Roman Catholic family as the second child of eight children of Anthonius Alphonsus Marie van Mierlo (born 9 May 1902) and Adriana Maria Francisca van der Schrieck (born 3 April 1905). After receiving his Gymnasium-A diploma at the Canisius College in Nijmegen he studied at the Radboud University Nijmegen, where he received a Bachelor of Laws and Master of Laws degree in 1960. After graduating, he became a journalist for the NRC Handelsblad and worked as a managing editor from 1960 until 1967, first as an editor Home Affairs, later as the opinion page's chief editor.

== Politics ==
=== Party foundation ===
In 1966 Van Mierlo together with Hans Gruijters founded the Democrats 66 party after continuing frustrations with "The Establishment" parties. Van Mierlo was selected as Leader and chairman of the Democrats 66 on 14 October 1966. For the 1967 general election Van Mierlo was the lead candidate and won seven seats in the House of Representatives, the first time the Democrats 66 won representation in the States General of the Netherlands.

Van Mierlo was elected to the House of Representatives and became the parliamentary leader of the Democrats 66 on 23 February 1967. For the 1971 general elections Van Mierlo again as lead candidate won eleven seats. For the 1972 general election Van Mierlo for the third time as lead candidate won only six seats but after a long formation period a coalition agreement with the Labour Party (PvdA), Catholic People's Party (KVP), Anti-Revolutionary Party (ARP) and the Political Party of Radicals (PPR) was made which formed the Den Uyl cabinet.

Hans Gruijters became Minister of Housing and Spatial Planning. Because of the disappointing election results Van Mierlo resigned as parliamentary leader and party leader on 1 September 1973. Van Mierlo remained a member of the House until after the 1977 general election on 8 June 1977.

=== Cabinet of Dries van Agt ===
After the 1981 general election Van Mierlo was asked by Jan Terlouw to become Minister of Defence in the Second Van Agt cabinet under Prime Minister Dries van Agt of the Christian Democratic Appeal (CDA) and served from 11 September 1981 until 4 November 1982. After the 1983 Senate election of 1983 Van Mierlo was elected to the Senate, serving from 13 September 1983 until 4 June 1986.

In 1986 Van Mierlo staged a political comeback and was re-elected as Leader of the Democrats 66 on 25 January 1986. For the 1986 general election, Van Mierlo, back as lead candidate, won nine seats. For the 1989 general election Van Mierlo, again as lead candidate, won twelve seats. For the 1994 general election Van Mierlo, for the sixth time as lead candidate, won twenty four seats and the Democrats 66 became a major party in the House of Representatives.

=== Cabinet of Wim Kok ===
After an arduous cabinet formation with the Labour Party and the People's Party for Freedom and Democracy (VVD), a deal was struck that resulted in the First Kok cabinet with Van Mierlo becoming Deputy Prime Minister and Minister of Foreign Affairs serving from 22 August 1994 until 3 August 1998.

The First Kok cabinet was considered groundbreaking in Dutch politics, because it was the first Cabinet of the Netherlands since 1908 without a Christian democratic party. On 7 March 1997, Van Mierlo announced his retirement as Leader of the Democrats 66. Van Mierlo remained Deputy Prime Minister and Minister of Foreign Affairs until the Second Kok cabinet was installed on 3 August 1998. For the 1998 general election, Van Mierlo was re-elected to the House of Representatives on 19 May 1998 but resigned on 18 August 1998.

=== Convention on the Future of Europe ===
Van Mierlo semi-retired from active politics on his sixty-seventh birthday. He served as the first Dutch representative to the Convention on the Future of Europe from 1 March 2002 until 26 September 2002. Following the end of his active political career, Van Mierlo occupied numerous seats on supervisory boards on cultural organizations.

== Personal ==
He was appointed Minister of State on 24 October 1998, a mainly honorary title for politicians with an extensive history of government service. Hans van Mierlo was married thrice. He has a son from his first marriage and two daughters from the second. Since 1999 Van Mierlo had a relationship with the Dutch writer Connie Palmen; they got married on 11 November 2009, in Amsterdam.

Hans van Mierlo died on 11 March 2010 at the age of 78; he had been living with a transplanted liver since 2000 which was required after liver failure as a consequence of a hepatitis C contamination contracted from a blood transfusion in 1982.

== Decorations ==
Honours
Ribbon bar	Honour	Country	Date	Comment
	Commander of the Order of Orange-Nassau	Netherlands	10 December 1982	
	Commander of the Order of the Netherlands Lion	Netherlands	30 December 1982	
	Commander of the Legion of Honour	France	12 February 1999	
	Grand Cross of the Order of Merit	Germany	30 May 2003	

Honorific titles
Ribbon bar	Honour	Country	Date	Comment
	Minister of State	Netherlands	24 October 1998	Style of Excellency

== Notes ==
Party political offices
New political party	Chairman of the Democrats 66; 1966–1967	Succeeded by Gerben Ringnalda
New political party	Leader of the Democrats 66; 1966–1973	Succeeded by Jan Terlouw
New political party	Lead candidate of the Democrats 66; 1967, 1971, 1972	Succeeded by Jan Terlouw; 1977
New political party	Parliamentary leader of the Democrats 66 in the House of Representatives; 1967–1973	Succeeded by Jan Terlouw
Preceded by Maarten Engwirda	Leader of the Democrats 66; 1986–1994	Succeeded by Els Borst
Preceded by Jan Terlouw; 1982	Lead candidate of the Democrats 66; 1986, 1989, 1994	Succeeded by Els Borst; 1998
Preceded by Maarten Engwirda	Parliamentary leader of the Democrats 66 in the House of Representatives; 1986–1989	Succeeded by Gerrit-Jan Wolffensperger
Political offices
Preceded by Pieter de Geus	Minister of Defence; 1981–1982	Succeeded by Job de Ruiter
Preceded by Wim Kok	Deputy Prime Minister; 1994–1998; Served alongside: Hans Dijkstal	Succeeded by Annemarie Jorritsma; Els Borst
Preceded by Pieter Kooijmans	Minister of Foreign Affairs; 1994–1998	Succeeded by Jozias van Aartsen
