= Lubbert Götzen =

Dutch politician (1894–1979)

Lubbertus Götzen
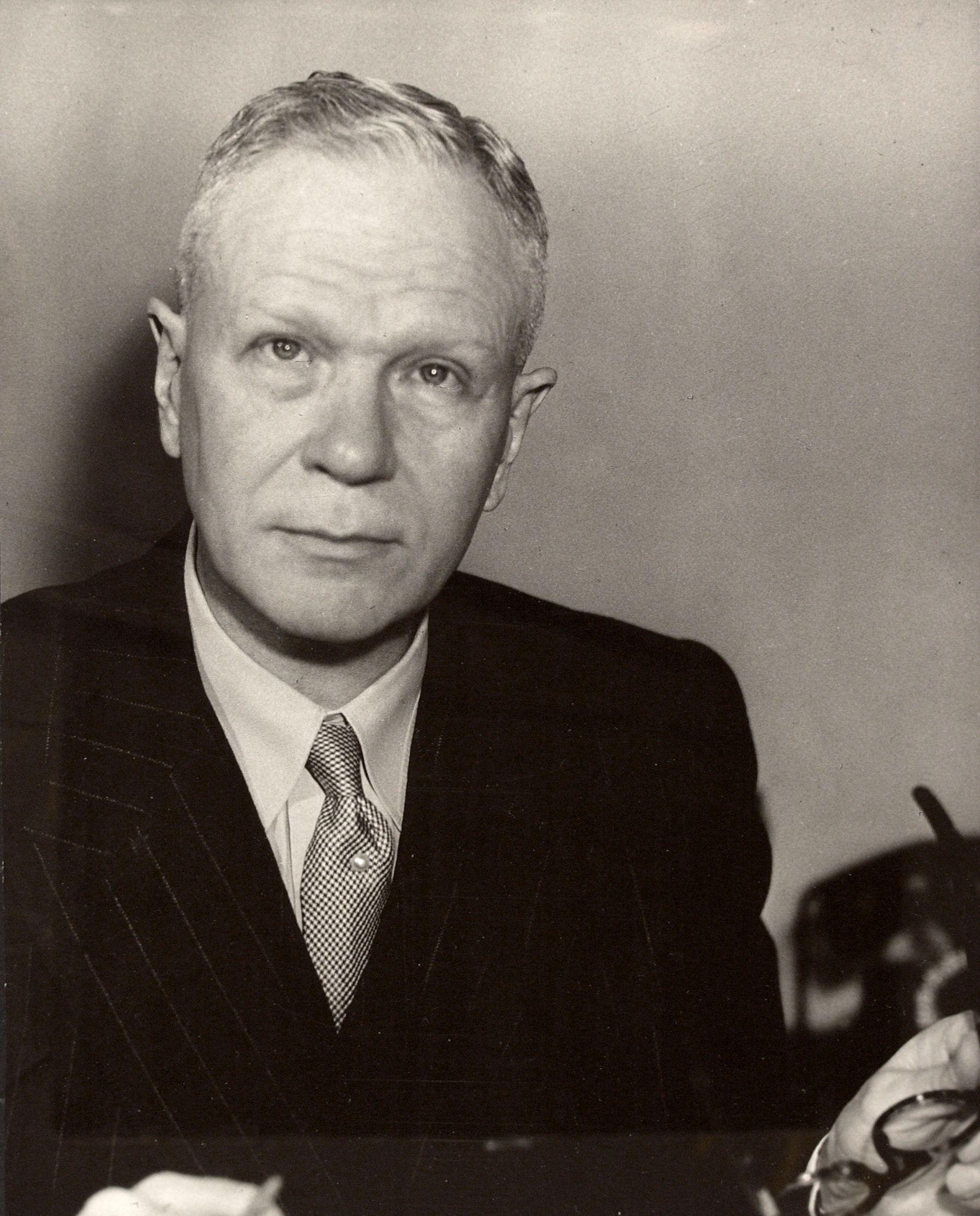
- Götzen in 1948

President of the Court of Audit
- In office 27 November 1956 – 1 January 1965
- Preceded by: Derk Johan Gerritsen
- Succeeded by: Charles Jean Marie Hens

State Secretary for Colonial Affairs
- In office 15 March 1951 – 2 September 1952 Serving with Nico Blom
- Prime Minister: Willem Drees
- Preceded by: Nico Blom
- Succeeded by: Theo Bot (1959)

Minister for Colonial Fiscal Policy
- In office 11 November 1947 – 15 March 1951
- Prime Minister: Louis Beel (1947–1948); Willem Drees (1948–1951)

Personal details
- Born: Lubbertus Götzen; 10 October 1894 Amsterdam, Netherlands
- Died: 13 July 1979 (aged 84) The Hague, Netherlands
- Party: Independent (Christian Democratic Protestant) (until 1952)
- Other political affiliations: Anti-Revolutionary Party (from 1952)
- Spouse: Antonia Maria de Vriendt (m. 1920)
- Occupation: Politician; Civil servant; Economist; Accountant; Nonprofit director

Lubbertus Götzen (10 October 1894 – 13 July 1979) was a Dutch accountant and politician. He embarked upon a civil service career in the Dutch East Indies. He was a minister of the Department of Finance. In Indonesia he was politically active in the Christian political party.

He was a Minister without Portfolio in the Drees–Van Schaik cabinet and First Beel cabinet. He was also a State Secretary for overseas territories in the First Drees cabinet.
