= Leendert Ginjaar =

Dutch politician (1928–2003)

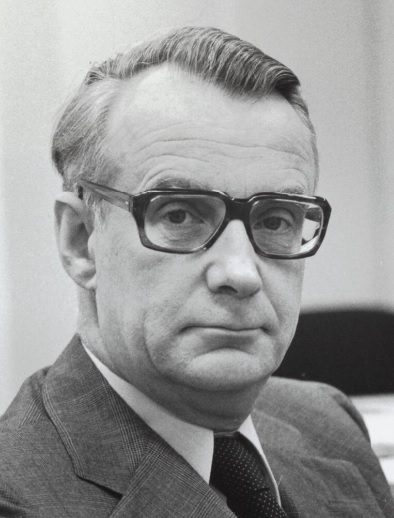
- Ginjaar in 1977

Parliamentary leader in the Senate
- In office 11 March 1997 – 14 September 1999
- Preceded by: Frits Korthals Altes
- Succeeded by: Nicoline van den Broek
- Parliamentary group: People's Party for Freedom and Democracy

Chairmen of the People's Party for Freedom and Democracy
- In office 29 November 1986 – 4 October 1991
- Leader: See list: Rudolf de Korte (1986) Joris Voorhoeve (1986–1990) Frits Bolkestein (1990–1998)
- Preceded by: Jan Kamminga
- Succeeded by: Dian van Leeuwen-Schut

Member of the Senate
- In office 25 August 1981 – 10 June 2003
- Parliamentary group: People's Party for Freedom and Democracy

Minister for Science Policy
- In office 1 April 1979 – 3 May 1979; Ad interim
- Prime Minister: Dries van Agt
- Preceded by: Rinus Peijnenburg
- Succeeded by: Ton van Trier

Minister of Health and Environment
- In office 19 December 1977 – 11 September 1981
- Prime Minister: Dries van Agt
- Preceded by: Irene Vorrink
- Succeeded by: Til Gardeniers-Berendsen

Member of the Scientific Council for Government Policy
- In office 1 July 1973 – 19 December 1977
- Director: Sjeng Kremers (1973–1977); Wim Schut (1977)

Personal details
- Born: 28 May 1928 Leiden, Netherlands
- Died: 17 September 2003 (aged 75) Goes, Netherlands
- Party: People's Party for Freedom and Democracy (from 1960)
- Spouse: Nell Ginjaar-Maas (m. 1954)
- Children: 3
- Education: Leiden University (Bachelor of Science, Master of Science, Doctor of Science)
- Occupation: Politician · Chemist · Researcher · Nonprofit director · Academic administrator · Activist · Lobbyist · Author · Professor

Leendert Ginjaar (28 May 1928 – 17 September 2003) was a Dutch politician of the People's Party for Freedom and Democracy (VVD) and chemist.

== Biography ==
Ginjaar attended a Gymnasium in Leiden from April 1940 until May 1946 and applied at the Leiden University in June 1946 majoring in Chemistry and obtaining a Bachelor of Science degree in June 1948 before graduating with a Master of Science degree in July 1952 and worked as a researcher at the Leiden University before he got a doctorate as a Doctor of Science in Chemistry in August 1956. Ginjaar worked as a researcher at the Organisation for Applied Scientific Research from August 1956 until December 1977 and served as Director of the department of Climatology from February 1970 until December 1977. Ginjaar served on the Provincial-Council of South Holland from July 1971 until December 1977. Ginjaar also served as a Member of the Scientific Council for Government Policy from 1 July 1973 until 19 December 1977.

After the election of 1977 Ginjaar was appointed as Minister of Health and Environment in the Cabinet Van Agt-Wiegel, taking office on 19 December 1977. Ginjaar served as acting Minister for Science Policy from 1 April 1979 until 3 May 1979 following the death of Rinus Peijnenburg. In December 1980, Ginjaar announced that he wouldn't stand for the election of 1981 but wanted to run for the Senate. Ginjaar was elected as a Member of the Senate after the Senate election of 1981, taking office on 25 August 1981 serving as a frontbencher chairing the parliamentary committee for Higher Education and Science Policy and the parliamentary committee for Housing and Spatial Planning and spokesperson for the Environment, Higher Education and Agriculture. The Cabinet Van Agt–Wiegel was replaced by the Cabinet Van Agt II following the cabinet formation of 1981 on 11 September 1981. Ginjaar also served as Chairmen of the People's Party for Freedom and Democracy from 29 November 1986 until 4 October 1991. Ginjaar served as a distinguished professor of Medical ethics at the Utrecht University from 1 September 1982 until 1 January 1986 and also served as Chairman of the Education board of the Utrecht University from 10 September 1982 until 1 January 1986 and a distinguished professor of Climatology and Medical research at the State University of Limburg from 1 March 1990 until 1 September 1994. Ginjaar was selected as Parliamentary leader of the People's Party for Freedom and Democracy in the Senate following the election of Frits Korthals Altes as President of the Senate, serving from 11 March 1997 until 14 September 1999. In November 2002 Ginjaar announced his retirement from national politics and that he wouldn't stand for the Senate election of 2003 and continued to serve until the end of the parliamentary term on 10 June 2003.

Ginjaar was known for his abilities as a manager and policy wonk. Ginjaar continued to comment on political affairs until his death four months later at the age of 75. His wife Nell was also a politician who served as State Secretary for Education and Sciences from 5 November 1982 until 7 November 1989.

== Decorations ==
Honours
Ribbon bar	Honour	Country	Date	Comment
	Commander of the Order of the Crown	Belgium	15 August 1979	
	Commander of the Order of the Oak Crown	Luxembourg	3 March 1980	
	Commander of the Order of Merit	Germany	30 May 1981	
	Knight of the Order of the Netherlands Lion	Netherlands	26 October 1981	
	Commander of the Order of Orange-Nassau	Netherlands	30 April 1994	
Awards
Ribbon bar	Awards	Organization	Date	Comment
	Honorary Member	People's Party for Freedom and Democracy	15 May 1998	

Party political offices
Preceded by Jan Kamminga	Chairman of the People's Party for Freedom and Democracy; 1986–1991	Succeeded by Dian van Leeuwen-Schut
Preceded by Frits Korthals Altes	Parliamentary leader of the People's Party for Freedom and Democracy in the Senate; 1997–1999	Succeeded by Nicoline van den Broek
Political offices
Preceded by Irene Vorrink	Minister of Health and Environment; 1977–1981	Succeeded by Til Gardeniers-Berendsen
Preceded by Rinus Peijnenburg	Minister for Science Policy; Ad interim 1979	Succeeded by Ton van Trier
Academic offices
Unknown	Chairman of the Education board of the Utrecht University; 1982–1986	Unknown
