= Kees Posthumus =

Dutch chemist

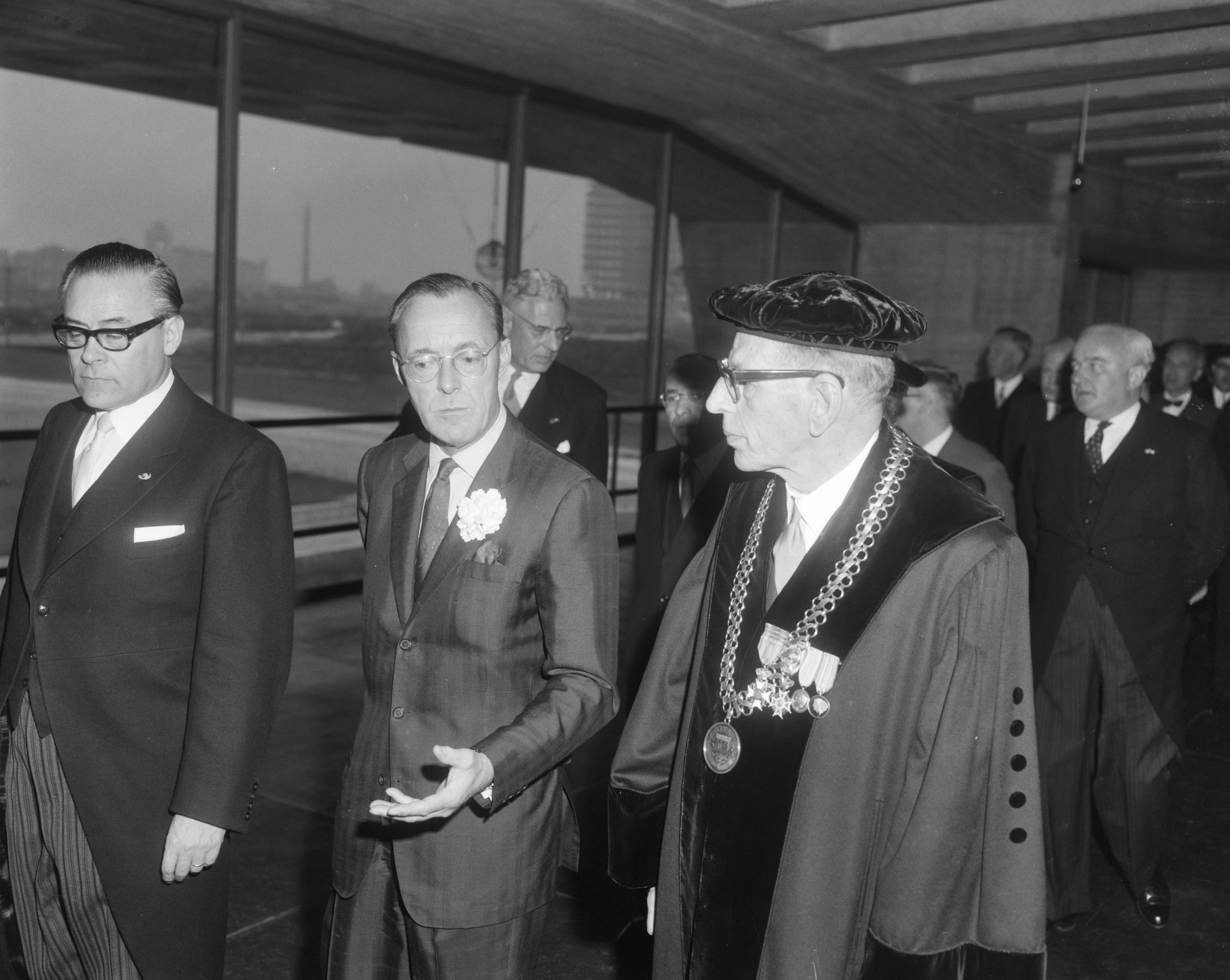
Posthumus (right) (1966)

Kees Posthumus (16 June 1902 – 14 September 1972) was a Dutch chemist. He was the second rector magnificus of the Eindhoven University of Technology.

== Biography ==
Kees Posthumus was born in Harlingen, Friesland, as the son of a wholesaler in wood. He attended HBS and then went on to study chemistry at the University of Groningen. He attained his propaedeuse there, whereupon he moved to the University of Leiden to continue his studies. While there he came into contact with Albert Einstein (who was a guest lecturer there) and with Johan Huizinga (through the rowing club). Upon gaining his engineering degree he took a teaching position at the Christian HBS in Leiden, while working on his doctorate under prof.dr. F.A.. Schreinemakers. While at the HBS he also made use of the HBS' lab to do experiments for his thesis; he was promoted in 1929 on the topic of Explosion areas in gaseous mixtures.

He left for the Dutch East Indies soon after his promotion, to teach chemistry at the Christian Lyceum of Bandung. He later became rector of the school. He published an article in De Gids in 1940 that is known as Posthumus' Law nowadays. In 1941 he was appointed extraordinary professor of the Technische Hogeschool Bandung. After the start of the Japanese occupation Posthumus was first interned at Bandung prison, then at the Cimahi concentration camp. He kept on teaching during his imprisonment.

After the Japanese surrender Posthumus became head of the Netherlands Government Information Service in India; in March 1946, he was made chairman of the Department of Technical Sciences at the provisional University of Bandung (housed in the facilities of the TH Bandung). In 1947 and 1948 he was a foreign correspondent for the Groene Amsterdammer and openly opposed the first Police Action against the Indonesian independence movement. Following the independence of Indonesia, he remained at the Bandung Institute of Technology until 1955.

After his return to The Netherlands in 1955 Posthumus was part of the advisory committee for the founding of the Technische Hogeschool Eindhoven. As a result, professor Dorgelo hired him as part of the original staff and he became one of the institutions first professors in September 1956. He succeeded Dorgelo as rector in 1961.

Posthumus' tenure as rector magnificus was a time of expansion for the Hogeschool. First of all in the physical sense: the campus was expanded and the first highrises were erected. Posthumus also secured funds from Philips to buy the organ that is still in the Auditorium. Posthumus also pushed for expansion of scientific activities, lobbying for the creation of a center for educational research, an architectural department, a business administration department and a faculty of medicine – all of which he achieved, with the exception of a medical department (the university did start a department of biomedical technology in 1997 though). He also supported a cooperative agreement with the University of Nigeria, Nsukka, the first university of the newly independent Nigeria.

Posthumus is not remembered by his colleagues and students for being a brilliant scientist; rather, he left his mark through his administrative qualities and achievements. Starting in 1960 he was appointed deputy chairman of the national Board of Education (Dutch: Onderwijsraad). In November 1967 he was appointed government commissioner for higher education by Education minister Veringa; this was also the reason for his stepping down as rector per the following academic year (conflict of interest of these positions), in favor of Ton van Trier. In 1968 Posthumus published a policy brief entitled De universiteit, doelstellingen, functies, structuren (English: The university, goals, functions, structures), which is commonly known as the Nota Posthumus. This brief was the basis for policy reform proposals by minister Veringa and his successor van Veen.

Posthumus died in Eindhoven in 1972. The Eindhoven University has a bust of him in the Traverse building.

== Posthumus' Law ==
According to Posthumus' Law, the result of grading a test or exam in education is that one quarter of students will fail, one half will get a middle but passing grade and one quarter will receive a high grade. Put differently: the academic requirements adjust themselves to the bell curve.

== Quotes ==
- Theoretical physicists are prophets, mathematicians are high priests and chemists are acolytes.
- Academic research and educations are two parts of the same weave; their threads may be discerned from one another, but not separated from each other without destroying the texture.
