= Irene Vorrink =

Dutch politician (1918–1996)

Her Excellency Irene Vorrink
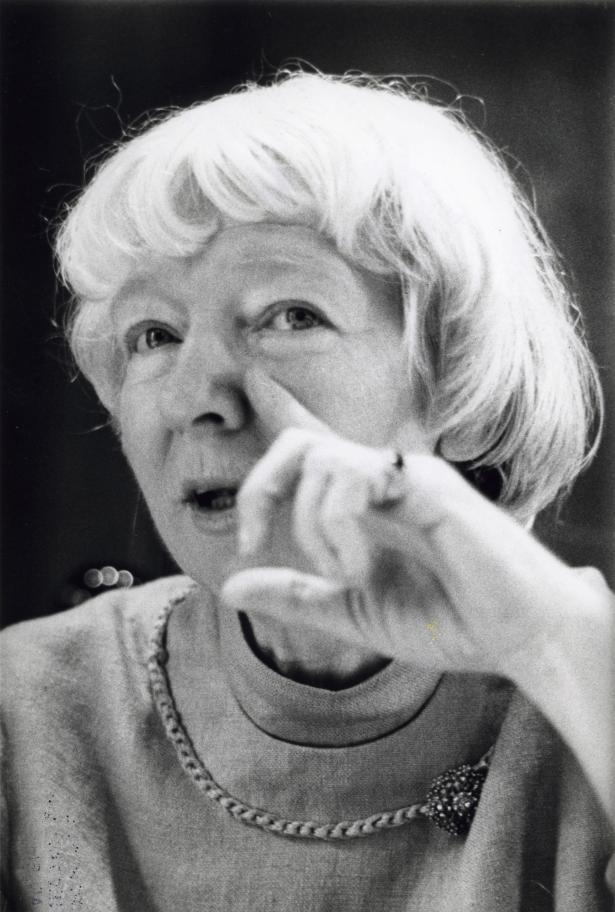
- Irene Vorrink in 1979

Minister of Health and Environment
- In office 11 May 1973 – 19 December 1977
- Prime Minister: Joop den Uyl
- Preceded by: Louis Stuyt
- Succeeded by: Leendert Ginjaar

Member of the Senate
- In office 16 September 1969 – 11 May 1973
- Parliamentary group: Labour Party

Personal details
- Born: Irene Vorrink; 7 January 1918 The Hague, Netherlands
- Died: 21 August 1996 (aged 78) Leek, Netherlands
- Party: Labour Party (from 1946)
- Other political affiliations: Social Democratic; Workers' Party (1936–1946)
- Spouse: Joop Zwart (m. 1946; div. 1948)
- Domestic partner(s): Petrus Hugenholtz (1954–1996)
- Children: Koos Zwart (1947–2014)
- Parent: Koos Vorrink (1891–1955) (father)
- Education: University of Amsterdam (Bachelor of Laws, Master of Laws)
- Occupation: Politician · Civil servant · Jurist · Journalist · Editor · Nonprofit director

Irene Vorrink (7 January 1918 – 21 August 1996) was a Dutch politician of the Labour Party (PvdA).

She was born on 7 January 1918 in The Hague as the daughter of the Dutch socialist leader Koos Vorrink. She studied law until 1943 and held several legal functions, before she became a member of the Senate for the PvdA in 1969.

In 1973 she became Minister of Health in the cabinet Den Uyl. A major issue was the legislation concerning drugs, which she achieved in 1976 together with Minister of Justice, Dries van Agt. The Netherlands has since then employed a distinction between hard and soft drugs.

She also took the leading role in attempting to establish a legal basis for the fluoridation of drinking water. Though fluoridation to prevent tooth decay had been occurring in many areas across the Netherlands for years, the Supreme Court ruled in 1973 that it should be specifically provided for in the Water Supply law. Her bill to do so did not find support in the House of Representatives outside her own party, and was dropped.

From 1978 until 1979 Vorrink was an alderman in the city of Amsterdam. A 16 MW nearshore wind farm in the IJsselmeer was named after her in 1996.

Political offices
Preceded by Louis Stuyt	Minister of Health and Environment; 1973–1977	Succeeded by Leendert Ginjaar
