= Koos Vorrink =

Dutch politician

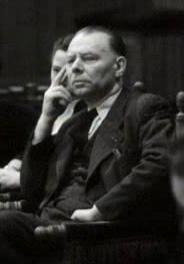
Koos Vorrink in 1951

Jacobus Jan Vorrink (7 June 1891 – 19 July 1955), better known as Koos Vorrink, was a socialist leader in the Netherlands.

== Early life ==
Koos Vorrink was born on 7 June 1891 in Vlaardingen, in the Dutch province of South Holland.

He started his career as a schoolteacher. On 1 November 1920 he became secretary of the Arbeiders Jeugd Organisatie (AJC), the Dutch socialist youth movement. On 11 May 1924 he became chairman of the socialist youth movement.

On 13 July 1916 he married Irene Hendrika Bergmeijer. Together they had two daughters. Only one daughter survived, Irene Vorrink (7 January 1918 - 21 August 1996), who would become minister of Health in the cabinet Den Uyl (1973–1977).

Vorrinks career progressed as he became chairman of the SDAP, the Dutch socialist party before World War II, on 1 April 1934. He would remain chairman of the SDAP until January 1946.

== Life during World War II ==
As Nazi Germany occupied the Netherlands in 1940 Vorrink tried in vain to escape to England. After his failed attempt to escape he went into hiding to avoid being taken prisoner by the German occupational forces. He was a member of the Dutch resistance, notably as an editor of the underground newspaper "Het Parool".

On 1 April 1943 he was interned by the German occupational forces, first in the Scheveningen prison, later on in the concentration camp Sachsenhausen, near Berlin.

== Later life ==
In July 1945 he was appointed as a civil servant by prime-minister Willem Schermerhorn. Vorrink was charged with the arrest and prosecution of Dutch war criminals and political delinquents. Together with Hendrik Brugmans, Vorrink was the first Dutch civil servant with a political background (nicknamed 'The Schermerboys").

After the elections of 1946 he became a member of parliament, as a member of the social-democratic PvdA. He remained a member of parliament until 1954. As a member of parliament he was well known for his anti-communism. Vorrink therefore became the subject of a communist campaign of slander. As his rhetorical qualities were famous, in parliament he acted as the defence spokesman of the PvdA.

In February 1955 Vorrink suffered a stroke. He died on July 19, 1955, in Amsterdam.
