= Pieter de Geus =

Dutch politician (1929–2004)

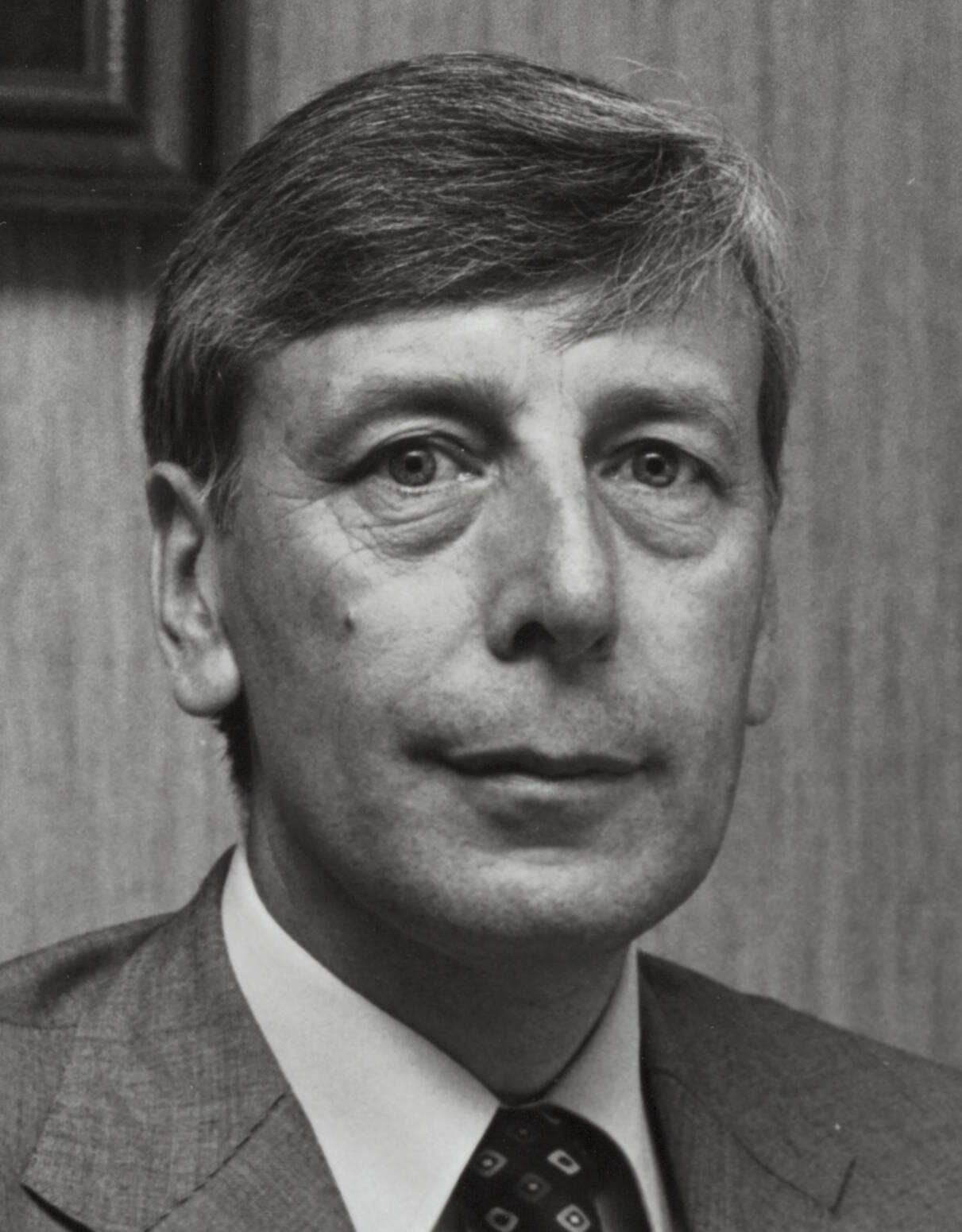
- Pieter de Geus in 1980

Minister of Defence
- In office 25 August 1980 – 11 September 1981
- Prime Minister: Dries van Agt
- Preceded by: Willem Scholten
- Succeeded by: Hans van Mierlo

Personal details
- Born: Pieter Boudewijn Richard de Geus; 23 February 1929 Rotterdam
- Died: 5 May 2004 (aged 75) Maassluis
- Education: Erasmus University Rotterdam; Leiden University

Pieter Boudewijn Richard de Geus (23 February 1929 – 5 May 2004) was a Dutch politician and a member of the Christian Democratic Appeal (CDA). From 1980 to 1981, he served as Minister of Defence in the First Van Agt cabinet.

== Biography ==
Pieter de Geus was born on 23 February 1929 in Rotterdam. He studied business economics at the Erasmus University Rotterdam. In 1946, he went into the Royal Netherlands Navy, studying at the Royal Naval College before finding employment at the Ministry of Defence, where he became Director-General of Economics and Finance in 1976.

In 1980, de Geus was picked to be Minister of Defence in the First Van Agt cabinet. As minister, he was a strong opponent of unilateral disarmament, and wrote a letter to the commanders of the Dutch Armed Forces on the desirability of nuclear armaments, for which the opposition accused him of infringing on officers' free speech rights. After his tenure as minister, he would serve in various other roles, including Director-General of Eurostat from 1982 to 1984 and a member of the board of directors of the Netherlands Organisation for Applied Scientific Research from 1984 to 1990. In 1998, he obtained his PhD from Leiden University on the topic of the New Guinea question.

Pieter de Geus died in Maassluis on 5 May 2004.

== See also ==
- Eurostat

Preceded by Willem Scholten	Minister of Defence; 25 August 1980 – 11 September 1981	Succeeded by Hans van Mierlo
