= Rinus Peijnenburg =

Dutch politician (1928–1979)

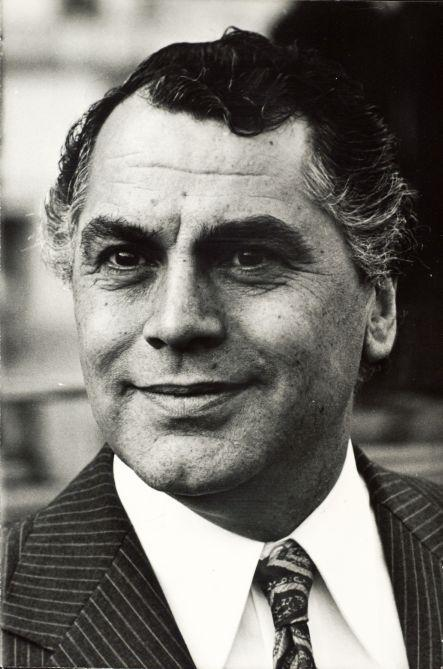
Portrait of drs. M.W.J.M. Peijnenburg, Minister for Science Policy in the First Van Agt Cabinet. Apr 1, 1979.

Marinus Wilhelmus Johanna Maria (Rinus) Peijnenburg (29 January 1928, Geldrop – 1 April 1979, Rotterdam) was a Dutch politician.

In 1966 he became a representative and joined the KVP parliamentary group until 1977. In 1977, he was a part of the First Van Agt cabinet as a minister without portfolio specializing in science policy, which he held until his death.
