= Willem Scholten =

Dutch politician

His Excellency Willem Scholten
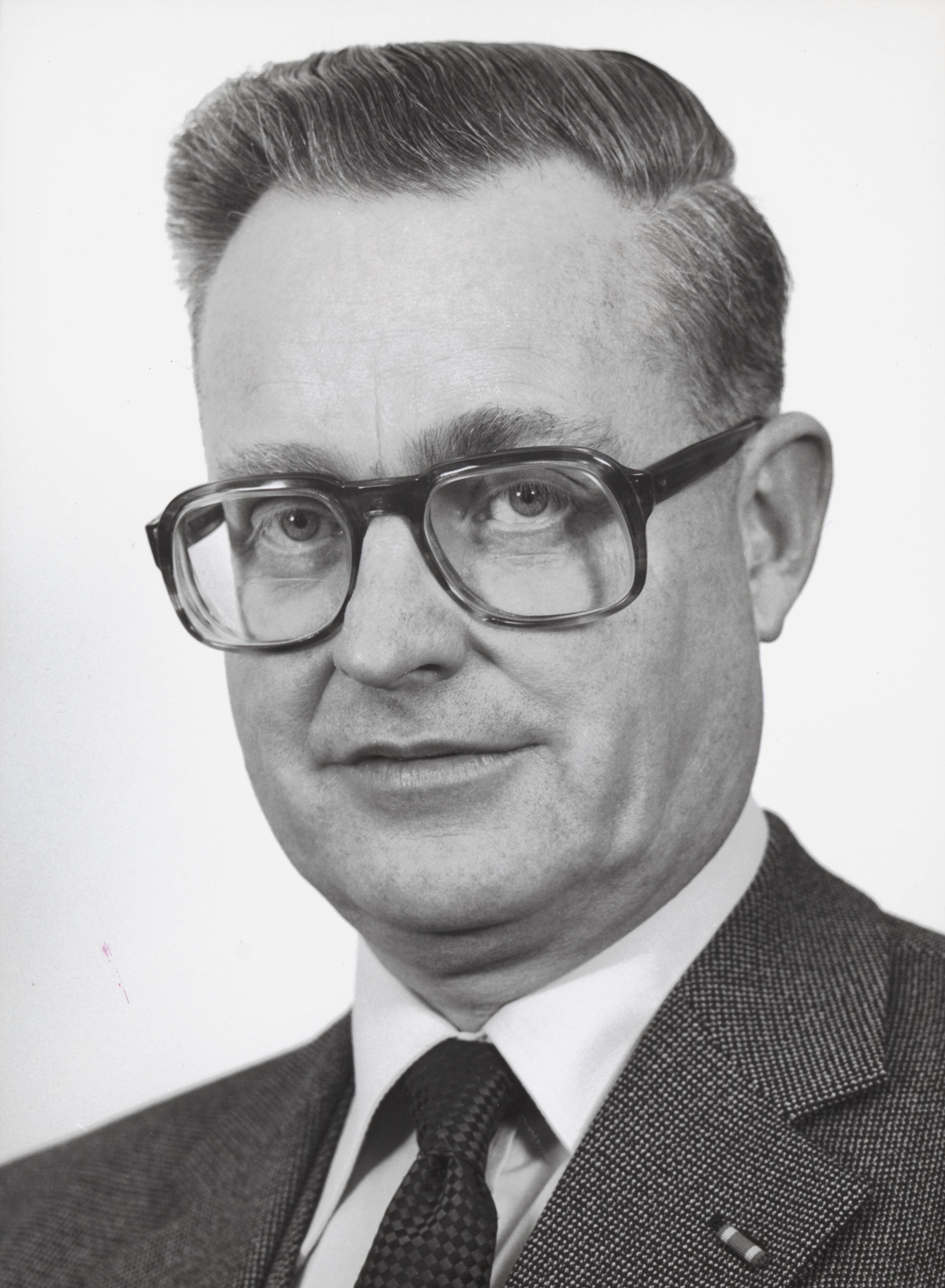
- Scholten in 1978

Vice-President of the Council of State
- In office 1 October 1980 – 1 July 1997
- Monarch: Beatrix
- Preceded by: Marinus Ruppert
- Succeeded by: Herman Tjeenk Willink

Minister of Defence
- In office 8 March 1978 – 25 August 1980
- Prime Minister: Dries van Agt
- Preceded by: Jan de Koning (Ad interim)
- Succeeded by: Pieter de Geus

Member of the Council of State
- In office 1 March 1976 – 8 March 1978
- Vice President: Marinus Ruppert

Member of the European Parliament
- In office 25 June 1973 – 1 March 1976
- Parliamentary group: Christian Democratic Group
- Constituency: Netherlands

State Secretary for Finance
- In office 14 July 1971 – 19 March 1973 Serving with Fons van der Stee
- Prime Minister: Barend Biesheuvel
- Preceded by: Ferd Grapperhaus
- Succeeded by: Fons van der Stee

Member of the House of Representatives
- In office 19 December 1972 – 1 March 1976
- In office 5 June 1963 – 14 July 1971
- Parliamentary group: Christian Historical Union

Personal details
- Born: Willem Scholten; 1 June 1927 Deventer, Netherlands
- Died: 1 January 2005 (aged 77) Leidschendam, Netherlands
- Party: Christian Democratic Appeal (from 1980)
- Other political affiliations: Christian Historical Union (until 1980)
- Education: University of Amsterdam (Bachelor of Laws, Master of Laws)
- Occupation: Politician · Civil servant · Jurist · Economist · Corporate director · Nonprofit director · Tax collector

Willem Scholten (1 June 1927 – 1 January 2005) was a Dutch politician of the defunct Christian Historical Union (CHU) party and later the Christian Democratic Appeal (CDA) party and economist. He was granted the honorary title of Minister of State on 1 July 1997.

== Biography ==
Scholten attended a Gymnasium in Deventer from May 1939 until June 1945 and applied at the National Tax Academy in Rotterdam in July 1945 and simultaneously applied at the University of Amsterdam in July 1945 majoring in Tax law and obtaining a Bachelor of Laws degree in June 1947 before graduating with a Master of Laws degree in July 1951. Scholten worked as a civil servant for Tax and Customs Administration of the Ministry of Finance from September 1951 until June 1963.

Scholten was elected as a Member of the House of Representatives after the election of 1963, taking office on 5 June 1963 serving as a frontbencher and spokesperson for Finances and deputy spokesperson for Justice and Economic Affairs. After the election of 1971 Scholten was appointed as State Secretary for Finance in the Cabinet Biesheuvel I, taking office on 14 July 1971. The Cabinet Biesheuvel I fell just one year later on 19 July 1972 and continued to serve in a demissionary capacity until the first cabinet formation of 1972 when it was replaced by the caretaker Cabinet Biesheuvel II with Scholten continuing as State Secretary for Finance, taking office on 9 August 1972. After the election of 1972 Scholten returned as a Member of the House of Representatives, taking office on 19 December 1972 but he was still serving in the cabinet and because of dualism customs in the constitutional convention of Dutch politics he couldn't serve a dual mandate he subsequently resigned as State Secretary for Finance on 19 March 1973. Following the second cabinet formation of 1972 Scholten was not giving a cabinet post in the new Cabinet Den Uyl and he continued to serve in the House of Representatives as a frontbencher and spokesperson for Finances and Economic Affairs and deputy spokesperson for Justice and International trade. Scholten was selected as a Member of the European Parliament and dual served in those positions, taking office on 25 June 1973. In February 1976 Scholten was nominated as Member of the Council of State, he resigned as a Member of the House of Representatives and a Member of the European Parliament the same day he was installed as a Member of the Council of State, taking office on 1 March 1976. Scholten was appointed as Minister of Defence in the Cabinet Van Ag-Wiegel following the resignation of Roelof Kruisinga, taking office on 8 March 1978. In August 1980 Scholten was nominated as Vice-President of the Council of State, he resigned as Minister of Defence on 25 August 1980 and was installed as Vice-President, serving from 1 October 1980 until 1 July 1997.

Scholten semi-retired after spending 34 years in national politics and became active in the private sector and public sector and occupied numerous seats as a corporate director and nonprofit director on several boards of directors and supervisory boards (Institute of International Relations Clingendael, Society for Statistics and Operations Research, Royal Library of the Netherlands, SEO Economic Research and the Carnegie Foundation) and served on several state commissions and councils on behalf of the government (Public Pension Funds PFZW, Statistics Netherlands and the Public Pension Funds APB).

Scholten was known for his abilities as a negotiator and consensus builder. Scholten continued to comment on political affairs as a statesman until his death at the age of 77 and holds the distinction as the second longest-serving Vice-President of the Council of State after World War II with 16 years, 273 days.

== Honours and appointments ==
=== Appointments ===
- Netherlands: Minister of State (1 July 1997) with style of His Excellency

=== Honours ===
National

- Grand Officer of the Order of Orange-Nassau (1 July 1997)
- Commander of the Order of Orange-Nassau (15 September 1980)
- Knight of the Order of the Netherlands Lion (8 June 1973)

Foreign

- Belgium: Grand Cross of the Order of the Crown (5 August 1982)
- France: Grand Officer of the Order of Legion of Honour (12 May 1985)
- Germany: Grand Cross of the Order of Merit of the Federal Republic of Germany (10 December 1990)
- Luxembourg: Grand Cross of the Order of the Oak Crown (30 November 1986)
- Suriname: Grand Officer of the Honorary Order of the Yellow Star (12 January 1988)

Political offices
Preceded by Ferd Grapperhaus	State Secretary for Finance; 1971–1973; With: Fons van der Stee	Succeeded by Fons van der Stee
Preceded by Jan de Koning; Ad interim	Minister of Defence; 1978–1980	Succeeded by Pieter de Geus
Preceded by Marinus Ruppert	Vice-President of the Council of State; 1980–1997	Succeeded by Herman Tjeenk Willink
