= Ton van Trier =

Dutch academic and politician (1926–1983)

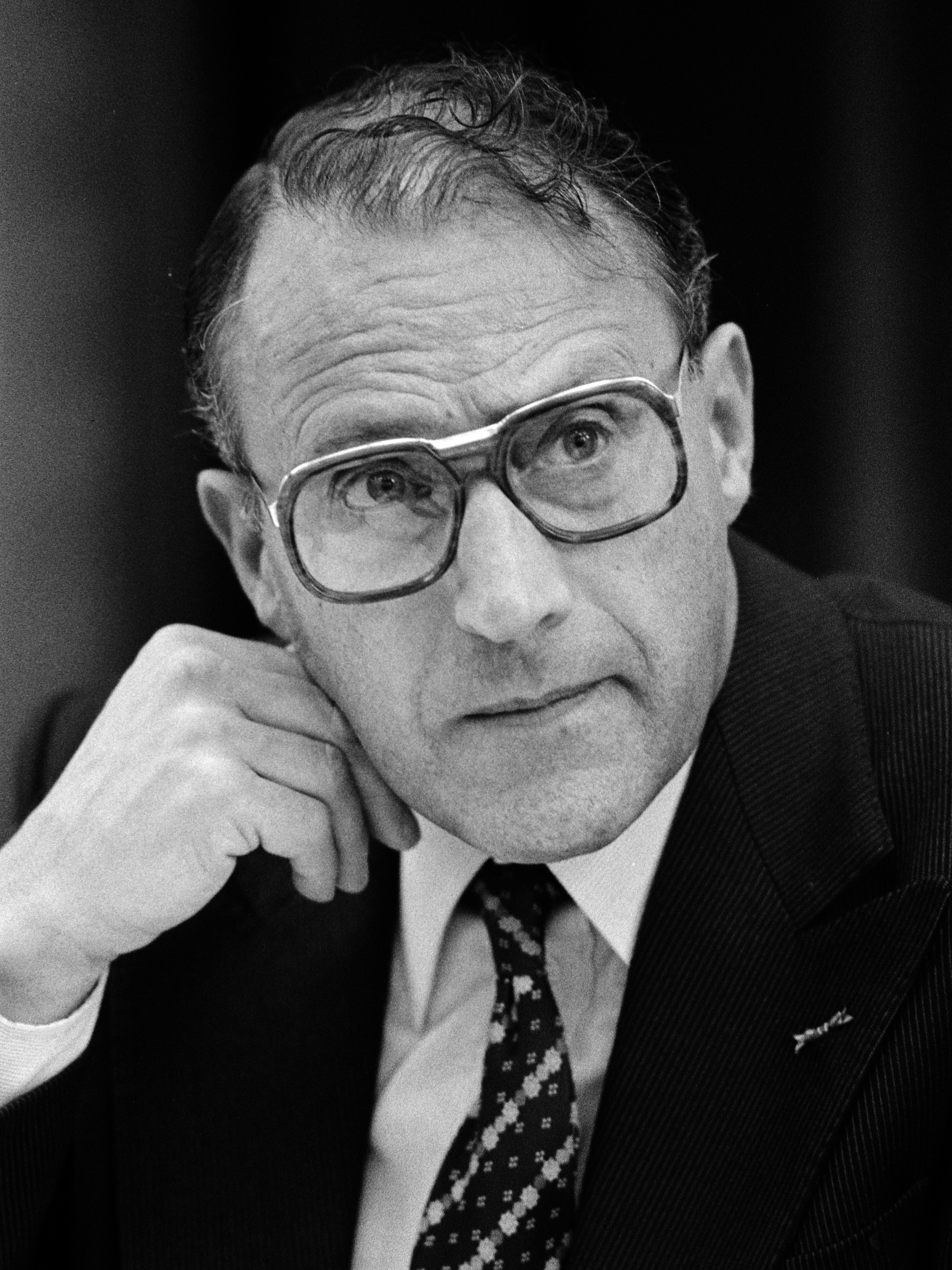
- Van Trier in 1981
- Born: Anthonius Arnoldus Theodurus Maria van Trier; 7 February 1926; Oss, Netherlands
- Died: 26 November 1983 (aged 57); Eindhoven, Netherlands
- Occupations: Professor, politician

Minister for Science Policy
- In office 3 May 1979 – 11 September 1981
- Prime Minister: Dries van Agt
- Preceded by: Leendert Ginjaar
- Succeeded by: –

Rector magnificus of the Eindhoven University of Technology
- In office 1968–1971
- Preceded by: Kees Posthumus
- Succeeded by: G. Vossers
- Political party: Christian Democratic Appeal

Academic background
- Education: Delft University of Technology

Academic work
- Discipline: Electrical engineering
- Institutions: Eindhoven University of Technology, Scientific Council for Government Policy

Anthonius Arnoldus Theodurus Maria "Ton" van Trier (7 February 1926 – 26 November 1983) was a Dutch politician for the Christian Democratic Appeal (CDA) and professor of electrical engineering.

== Decorations ==
Honours
Ribbon bar	Honour	Country	Date	Comment
	Knight of the Order of the Netherlands Lion	Netherlands		
	Commander of the Order of Orange-Nassau	Netherlands		

Political offices
Preceded by Leendert Ginjaar	Minister for Science Policy; 1979–1981	Succeeded by –
Civic offices
Preceded by Kees Posthumus	Rector magnificus of the Eindhoven University of Technology; 1968–1971	Succeeded by G. Vossers
