= Henk Dorgelo =

Dutch physicist and academic (1894–1961)

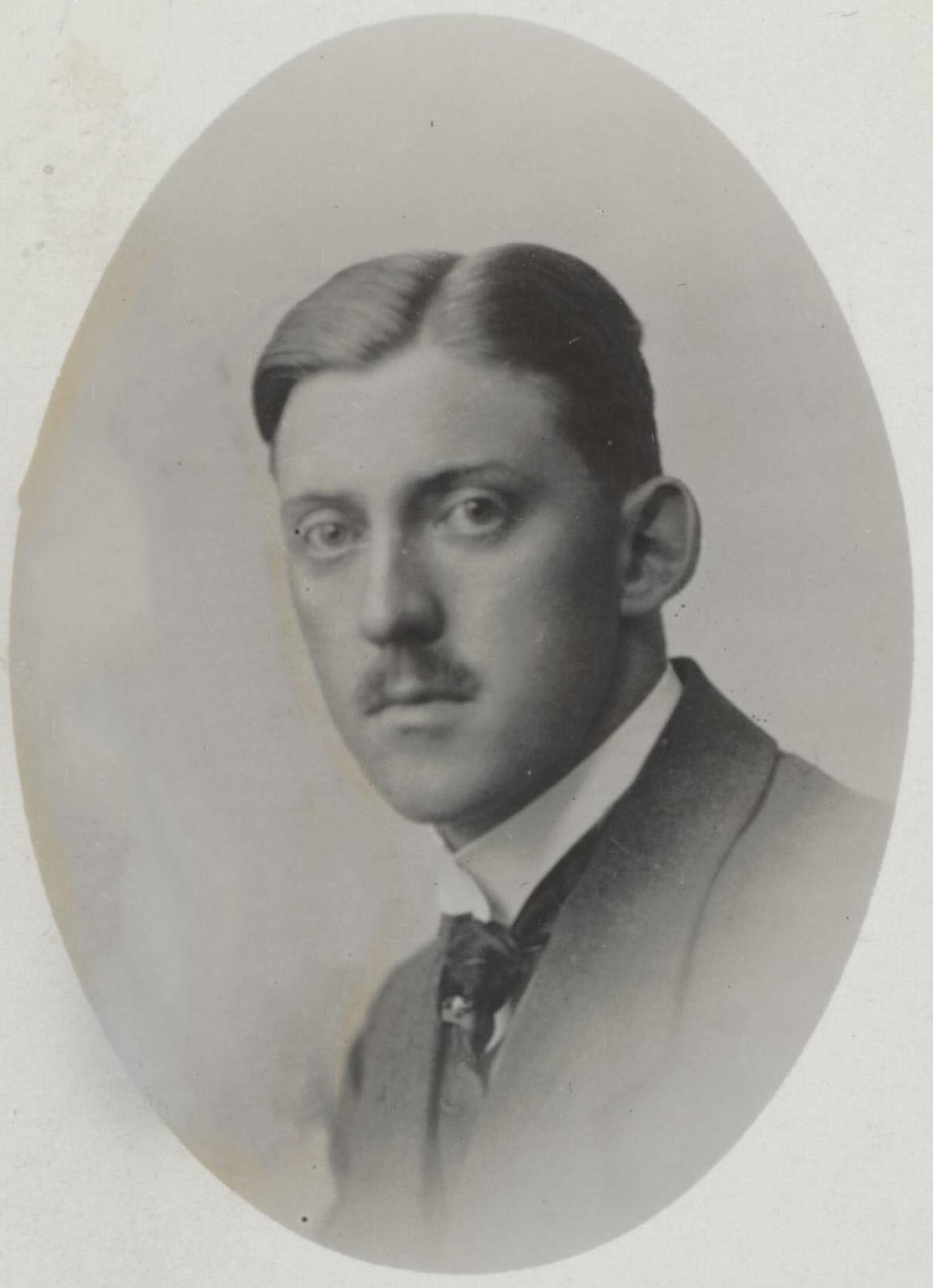
Dorgelo

Hendrik Berend Dorgelo (9 February 1894 in Dedemsvaart – 6 March 1961 in Eindhoven) was a Dutch physicist and academic. He was the first rector magnificus of the Technische Hogeschool Eindhoven.

== Biography ==
Henk Dorgelo originally attended teachers' training college (Dutch: kweekschool) and became a teacher. He was drafted during World War I and did his state exams while serving as an officer. Now able to attend university, he decided to study mathematics and physics at the University of Utrecht. Following his propaedeuse in 1919, he combined study, work as a teacher at the Christelijk Gymnasium Utrecht and an internship in the laboratory of Leonard Ornstein. He earned his Ph.D. in physics in 1924, writing a thesis on gas discharge physics. The relationship of this work to the production of radio tubes got him a job at Philips' NatLab in Eindhoven. In 1925 he married a former pupil of his, Hermina Anna Plomp. Together they had four boys and three daughters.

In 1927 Dorgelo was appointed professor at Delft University of Technology, in order to set up the physics department. To this end he founded the Technisch Physische Dienst, a cooperative of Delft university and the Netherlands Organisation for Applied Scientific Research and became chairman of its board. In 1931 he became chairman of the Dutch Physics Society.

Being Dutch Reformed, in 1930 Dorgelo became a church elder of the Nieuwe Kerk in Delft, where he also played the organ.

In 1942, during the Nazi occupation of the Netherlands in World War II, Dorgelo accepted the position of Rector Magnificus of Delft University of Technology. Following the assassination of an NSB member by the Dutch resistance, a large number of students were interned and the rest was required to sign a declaration of loyalty. Led by Dorgelo, the university senate advised the student body to sign, citing that a university that remained open would be invaluable to the post-war rebuilding effort in the Netherlands. The result of this advice was a vote of no confidence by the students, however, and Dorgelo resigned as rector in 1943.

After the liberation of The Netherlands, rebuilding and renewed industrialization were cause for an increased call for another technical university to increase the capacity of the country. Education Minister mr. J. Cals requested Dorgelo to become rector, causing him to move back to Eindhoven in 1956. Being in favor of a broad educational program, Dorgelo hired professors from the social fields as well as scientific fields in order to set up a General Sciences department. In 1958 he also joined the Studium Generale committee.

Even though he intended to be a teaching professor, the administration of the new university took up all of Dorgelo's time, before and after the opening in 1957. Between then and his death in 1961 he only took on one PhD candidate, ir. K. Reinsma.

After Dorgelo's death, in 1964, one of the main roads near the university campus was renamed the "Dorgelolaan" (Dorgelo Avenue) in his honor. The main meeting room of the University Council carries the name "Dorgelozaal" (Dorgelo Hall).
