= De Volkskrant =

Dutch newspaper

de Volkskrant

- Front page of de Volkskrant on 29 March 2010
- Type: Daily newspaper
- Format: Compact
- Owner: DPG Media
- Editor-in-chief: Kamila Leupen
- Founded: 2 October 1919
- Ceased publication: 4 October 1941
- Relaunched: 8 May 1945
- Political alignment: Centre-left
- Language: Dutch
- Headquarters: Jacob Bontiusplaats 9
- City: Amsterdam
- Country: Netherlands
- OCLC number: 781575477
- Website: volkskrant.nl

De Volkskrant (Dutch pronunciation: [də ˈvɔl(ə)kskrɑnt]; lit. 'The People's Paper'), stylized as de Volkskrant, is a Dutch daily morning newspaper. De Volkskrant had 322,934 active subscriptions in 2025 and is the third biggest newspaper in the Netherlands.

== History and profile ==
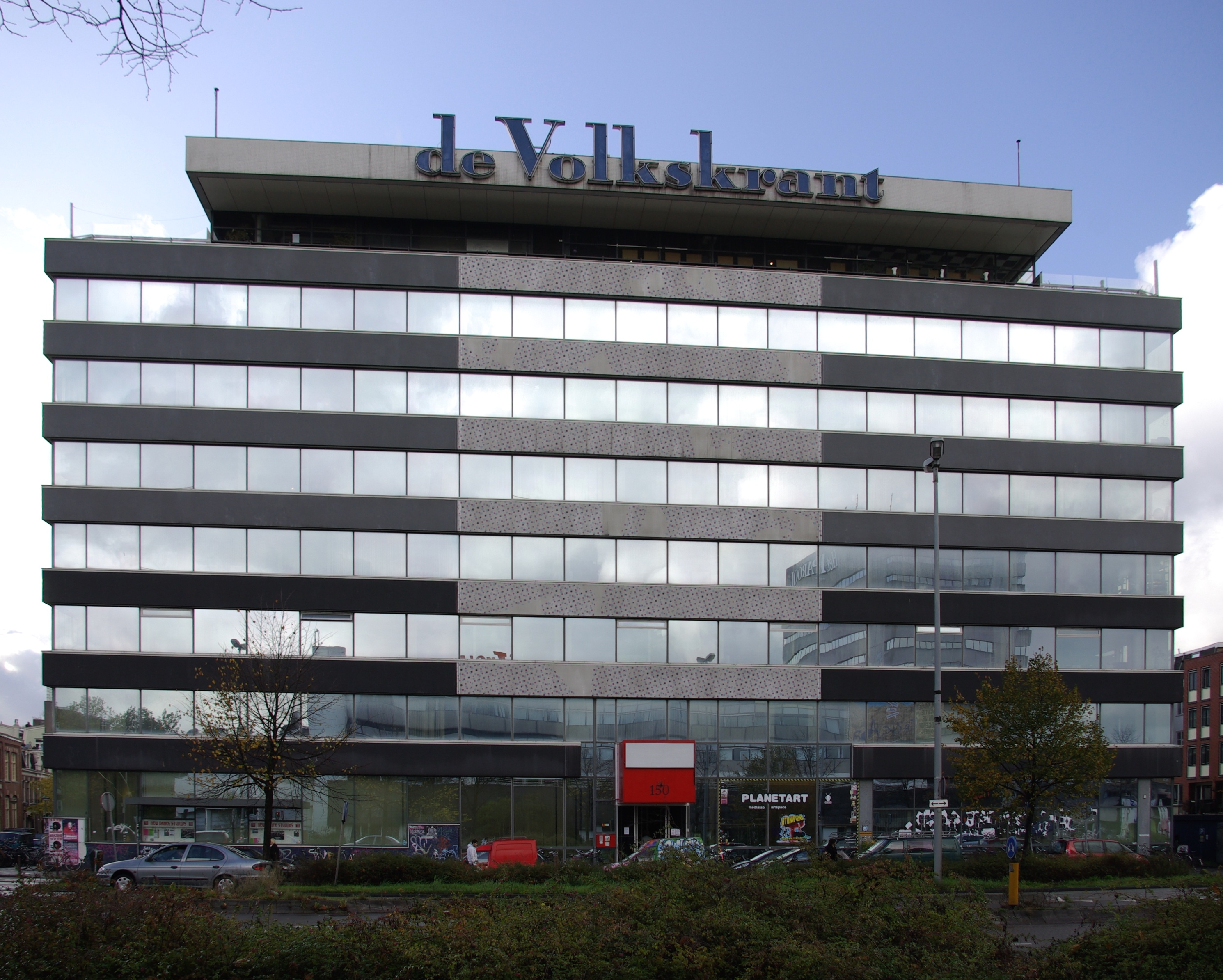
Former headquarters in Amsterdam-Oost

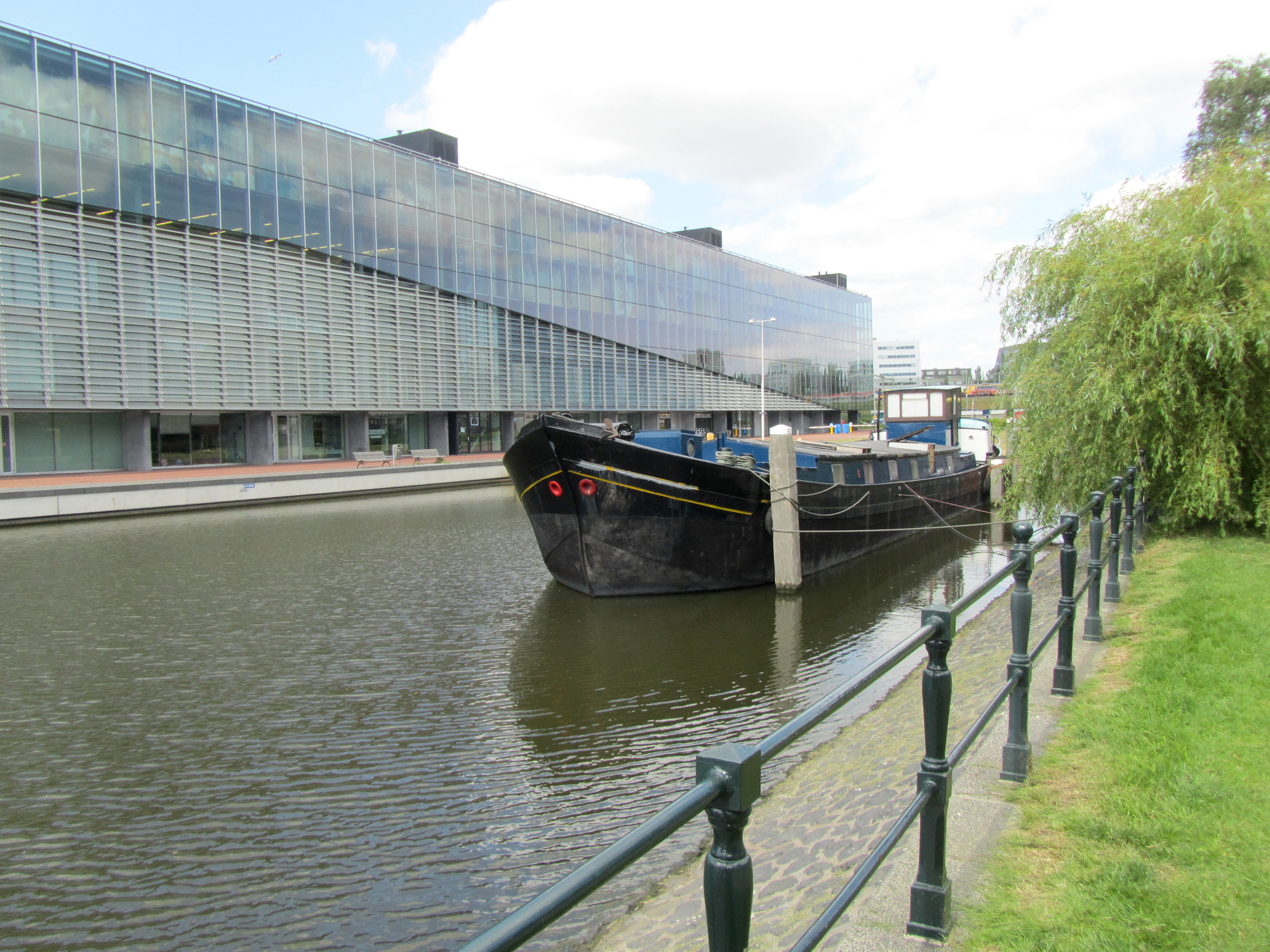
Current headquarters in Amsterdam-Centrum

De Volkskrant was founded in 1919 and has been a daily morning newspaper since 1921. Originally de Volkskrant was a Roman Catholic newspaper closely linked to the Catholic People's Party and the Catholic pillar. The paper temporarily ceased publication in 1941.

On its re-founding in 1945, its office moved from Den Bosch to Amsterdam. It became a left-wing newspaper in the 1960s, but began softening its stance in 1980. On 23 August 2006 the Volkskrant published its 25,000th edition.

In 1968, the ownership of De Volkskrant and Het Parool merged into a new parent, De Perscombinatie. Het Parool gained control due to the larger investment in the parent. De Perscombinatie started joint printing. In 1975, Trouw joined. In 1994 De Perscombinatie acquired Uitgeverij Meulenhoff & Co and became PCM Uitgevers. In 1995 PCM acquired the larger Nederlandse Dagblad Unie, owners of the Algemeen Dagblad en NRC Handelsblad. In 1996 it acquired De Volkskrant. PCM was acquired in 2009 by De Persgroep from Belgium and in December 2009 renamed De Persgroup Nederland, now DPG Media Nederland.

In 2010, Pieter Broertjes completed his 20-year tenure as editor-in-chief. In 2013 de Volkskrant was awarded the European Newspaper of the Year in the category of nationwide newspapers.

In October 2006, de Volkskrant announced it intended to start publishing a free version of its paper, targeting young people. As PCM gave no permission this never happened.

== Circulation ==
In 2001 the circulation of De Volkskrant was 335,000 copies.

Print circulation remains the third largest of the Netherlands, after De Telegraaf and Algemeen Dagblad.

== Character ==
Formerly a leading centre-left Catholic broadsheet, de Volkskrant today is a medium-sized centrist compact and popular among voters of Progressief Nederland

== Awards ==
De Volkskrant journalists Maud Effting and Willem Feenstra were awarded the 2026 European Press Prize Distinguished Reporting Award for What the wounds are telling us. The work was based on testimony and documentation from international medical professionals working in Gaza during the genocide and combined "data gathering together with deeply human portraits of the doctors".

== Typeface ==
The typeface Capitolium News by Gerard Unger (2006) has been the main type used in de Volkskrant since 2 December 2006.
