= Marcel van Grunsven =

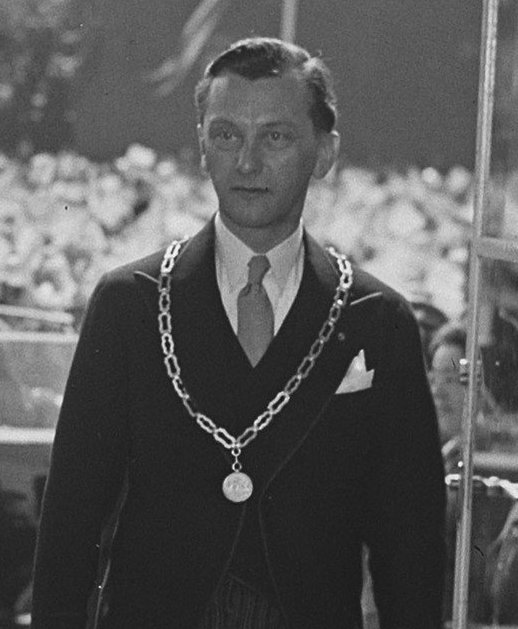
- Mayor M.F.G.M. van Grunsven (1948)

Mayor of Susteren
- In office 1923–1926
- Preceded by: J.F.J. Evertz
- Succeeded by: Joseph Johannes Hermans

Mayor of Heerlen
- In office 1926–1961
- Preceded by: Marius Alphonse Marie Waszink
- Succeeded by: Charles van Rooy

Personal details
- Born: Marcellus Franciscus Gerardus Maria van Grunsven; December 4, 1896 Gennep, Netherlands
- Died: July 24, 1969 (aged 72) Heerlen, Netherlands

Marcellus Franciscus Gerardus Maria (Marcel) van Grunsven (4 December 1896 – 24 July 1969) was a Dutch municipal secretary, administrator, and politician who served as mayor of Susteren and later Heerlen. He was mayor of Heerlen from 1926 until his retirement in 1961, making him one of the longest-serving mayors in the city's history. He led Heerlen through the Great Depression, the Second World War, and the peak years of coal mining in South Limburg.

His tenure in Heerlen was marked by strict financial discipline, resilience during German occupation, and extensive urban development. Many of Heerlen's present-day national monuments were built under his administration.

== Early life ==
Van Grunsven was born in Gennep to Allegonda Johanna Martina Verzett (1869–1975) and Marcellus Franciscus van Grunsven (1864–1919), who served as mayor of Ottersum from 1903 until his death. He had two brothers and one sister. His brother Henri van Grunsven also became a mayor.

He attended the Bisschoppelijk College Weert-Cranendonck and began working for the municipality of Ottersum in 1917. In 1919, upon reaching the minimum legal age, he was appointed municipal secretary of Ottersum.

In 1930, he married Gertruda Margaretha Cornelia Janssen (1908–1994). The couple had five children.

== Mayor of Susteren ==
In 1923, at the age of 27, Van Grunsven was appointed mayor of Susteren due to his expertise in municipal finance. At the time, the municipality was experiencing serious financial difficulties. During his tenure, he stabilized municipal finances, oversaw the construction of a modern railway signal box, and commissioned a new residential district for railway workers designed by architect Jan Wielders in the style of the Amsterdam School.

== Mayor of Heerlen ==
=== Early years ===
Van Grunsven was appointed mayor of Heerlen by royal decree on 16 May 1926, succeeding Marius Alphonse Marie Waszink. At the time, Heerlen faced a municipal debt exceeding ten million guilders.

He implemented severe budget cuts, including voluntarily donating a significant portion of his own salary to support unemployed residents, an action that attracted national attention.

=== Urban development and culture ===
Van Grunsven sought to transform Heerlen from a provincial town into a modern city. He collaborated with architects such as Frits Peutz and urban planner Jos Klijnen. Landmark buildings commissioned during his tenure include the Glaspaleis, the Royal Theater, and the modern City Hall of Heerlen. Many later received national monument status.

After World War II, he actively promoted art and culture, commissioning artist Pieter Defesche and supporting hundreds of exhibitions in the city hall.

=== Second World War ===
Unlike many Dutch mayors, Van Grunsven remained in office throughout the German occupation. Despite repeated reprimands by the occupying authorities, he maintained a defiant stance, including publicly calling for prayers for Queen Wilhelmina of the Netherlands.

After liberation, he immediately initiated reconstruction efforts and welcomed Queen Wilhelmina during her visit to Heerlen on 22 March 1945.

In 2013, journalist Joep Dohmen criticized Van Grunsven's wartime conduct in his book De geur van kolen. Historians Fred Cammaert and Marcel Put disputed these claims in their 2014 publication Eindelijk 'n echte burgemeester.

== Retirement and death ==
Van Grunsven retired on 31 December 1961 after 35 years as mayor. He was succeeded by Charles van Rooy. In recognition of his service, he was named an honorary citizen of Heerlen, and a central square was named Burgemeester van Grunsvenplein.

He died on 24 July 1969 in Heerlen at the age of 72. He was buried at the General Cemetery on Akerstraat following a large public funeral.

== Honours ==
- Officer of the Order of Orange-Nassau (1933)
- Knight of the Order of the Netherlands Lion (1960)
- Recipient of the Dutch Red Cross Commemorative Cross 1940–1945

== Legacy ==
In 1961, the cultural Burgemeester van Grunsven Prize was established in his honor and awarded to prominent Dutch cultural figures, including Bertus Aafjes, Ton Lutz, and Hugo Brandt Corstius.

== See also ==
- List of mayors of Heerlen
