= Ven-Zelderheide =

Coordinates: 51°43′N 6°1′E

- Village
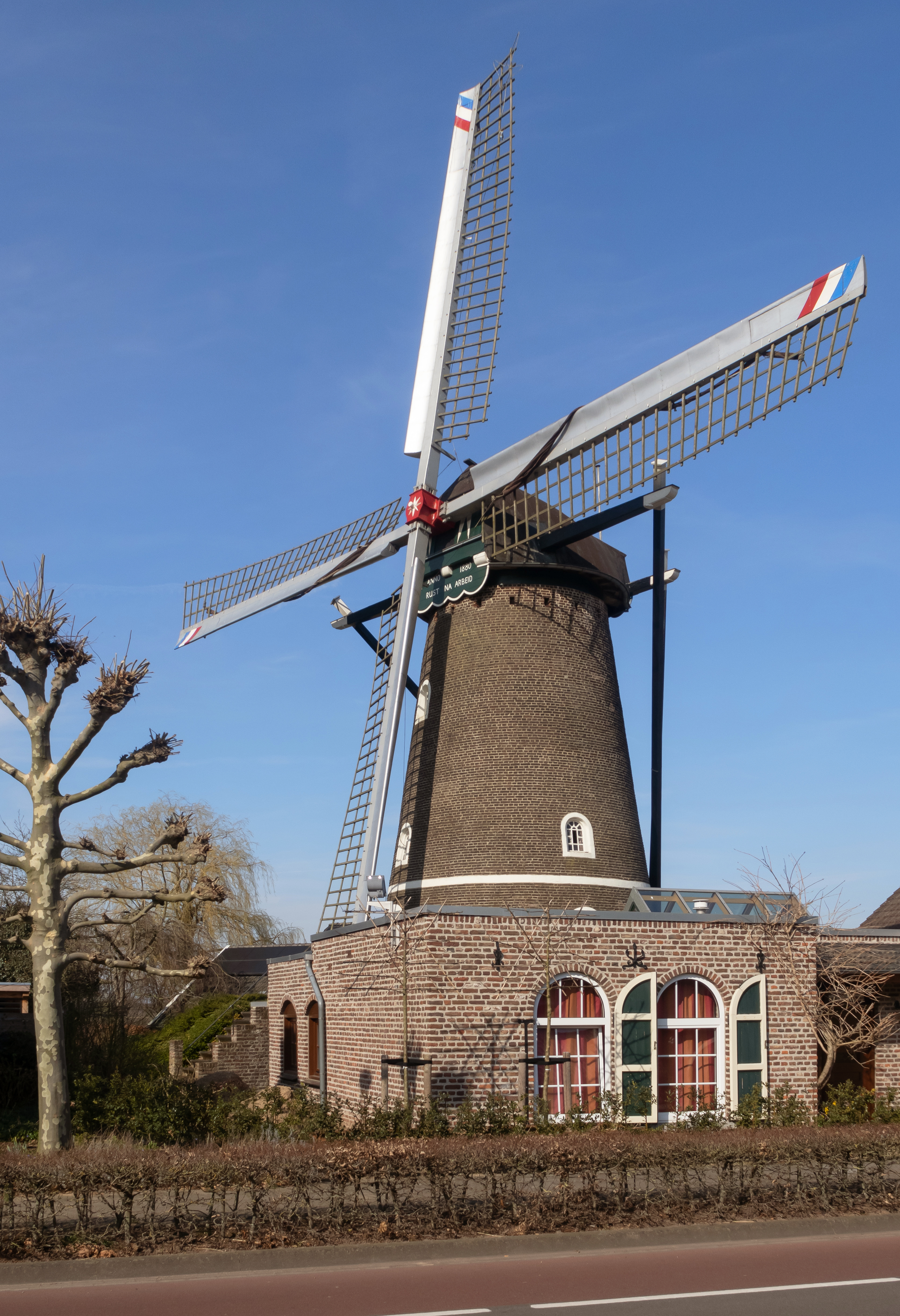
- Ven Zelderheide, windmill named: "Rust na Arbeid"

- Location in the Netherlands Location in the province of Limburg in the Netherlands
- Country: Netherlands
- Province: Limburg
- Municipality: Gennep

Area
  - Total: 0.69 km^{2} (0.27 sq mi)
- Elevation: 14 m (46 ft)

Population (2021)
  - Total: 595
  - Density: 860/km^{2} (2,200/sq mi)
- Time zone: UTC+1 (CET)
  - Summer (DST): UTC+2 (CEST)
- Postal code: 6599
- Dialing code: 0485

Ven-Zelderheide is a village in the southeast Netherlands. It is located in the municipality of Gennep, Limburg.

In 2011 the population reached just over 800.

The town has a typical linear geography with most of its residences situated along its two main roads; the Kleefseweg and the Vensestraat. In the southwest, Ven-Zelderheide is bordered by the town Ottersum, and in northeast it is bordered by Germany.

A windmill (Gristmill) called; Rest after Labor (Dutch: Rust na Arbeid) is situated at the Kleefseweg.

== History ==
Early writings on Zelder date from the end of the 14th century. In this time Zelder was part of Guelders and was managed by Johan Kodken van Zeller who lived in Haus Driesberg in a neighboring town called Kessel.

== Name ==
The town comprised three areas, which have influenced the town's current name.

The first part, “Ven” originates from the Dutch word “veen” which means peat, referring to the original vegetation in the northern part before it was cultivated and turned into arable land.

The second part, “Zelderheide” means: moorland of Zelder, referring to the former central situated moorland. Historically, the town consisted of three areas: an area of peat, an area with moorland and an area called Zelder, the latter is situated in the south.

Locally the town is referred to as “Het Ven”.

== Legend ==
According to a local legend, somewhere in the 15th century, the Dutchess of Cleves made a visit to Lord van Zeller. The road in Ven-Zelderheide on the way back to her castle in Cleves was so bad that the axle of her carriage broke and the carriage got stuck in the mud. The two coachmen quickly scanned the area in the incoming darkness but there were no people around. The Dutchess shouted for help but no one came. She then desperately prayed to Anthony the Great and then, all of a sudden, men started rushing in to help. To show her gratitude to the people of Ven-Zelderheide, she had a chapel built, devoted to Anthony the Great. The chapel can be seen in the Vensestraat.

== The Zelder estate ==
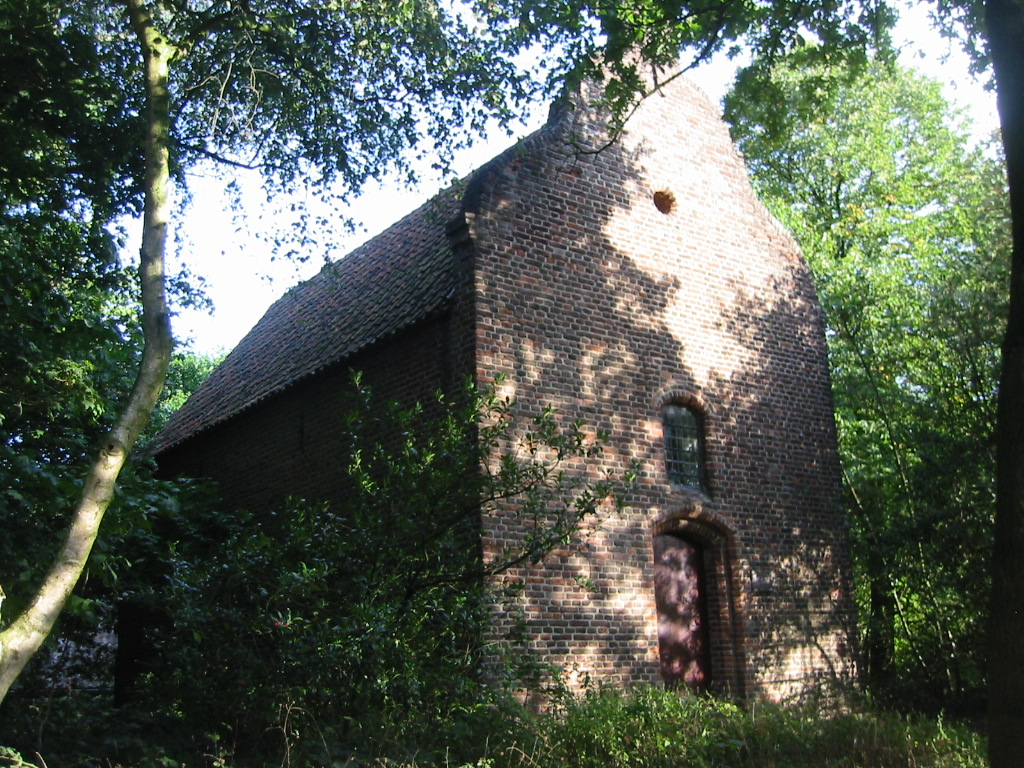
Zelder, Chapel on a mound, Anno 1600

The southern part of Ven-Zelderheide is considered an estate named Zelder. It is largely surrounded by the river Niers.

A large part of the estates consists of the national nature reserve the Zelderse Driessen.

During two separate archeological excavations on Zelder, in 1990 and 1997, a Merovingan cemetery dating from 6th/7th century was exposed. Gifts, like weapons and jewelry, found along with the graves, and two horse graves, indicated that some of the people buried there where of great wealth.

On the estate is a company situated called Euro Grass, previously known as Zelder, that is specialized in breeding new grass varieties.

The estate also has a chapel situated on a mound, built around the year 1600. The chapel is surrounded by several old monumental farmhouses.
