= Marianne Polderman-Kortekaas =

Dutch Paralympian

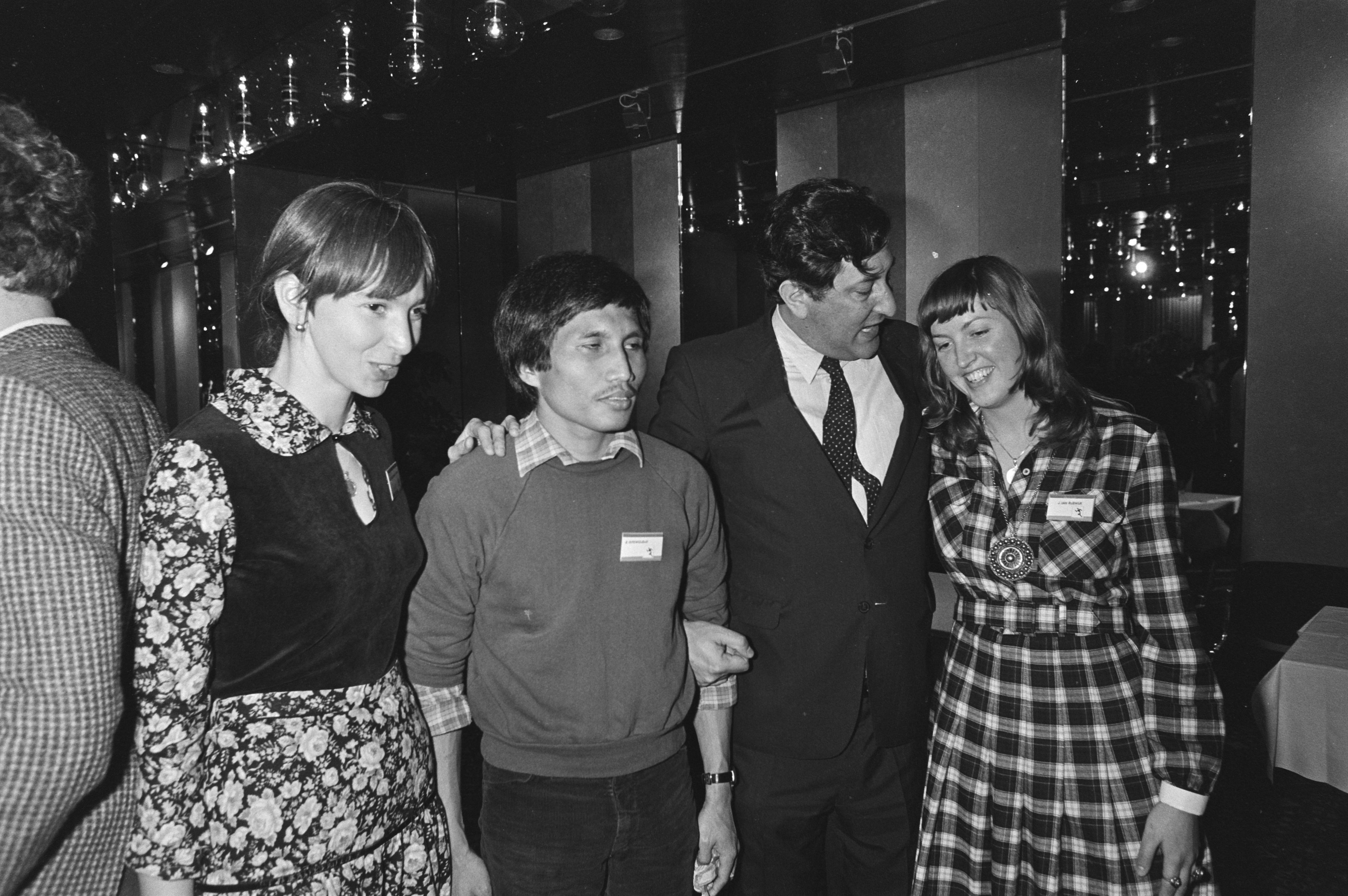
1980 Paralympic champions Marianne Kortekaas (left), Soedjeman Dipowidjojo and Joke van Rijswijk with Gerard Wallis de Vries in 1981.

Marianne Kortekaas or Marianne Polderman-Kortekaas (15 October 1947) is a Dutch former swimmer and athlete. She won three gold and three silver medals at the Summer Paralympics in the category of visually impaired athletes.

She competed at the 1976 Summer Paralympics in Toronto, Canada, winning a gold medal in 100 metre freestyle and 100 metre breaststroke, and a silver medal in 100 metre backstroke.

After she had married Ronald Polderman and switched over to athletics, she participated in the 1980 Summer Paralympics in Arnhem, the Netherlands. She won gold in the shotput and silver in both discus throw and javelin.

In 2020 she and her husband featured in a Dutch documentary film which shows their daily routines and challenges as visually impaired people living in Amsterdam. They move to an elderly home in Wolfheze, in the neighbourhood of the National Sports Centre Papendal where she won her 1980 "Paralympic" medals.

Polderman-Kortekaas has been honoured as a member in the Order of Orange-Nassau.

== See also ==
- Paralympic sports
- Sport in the Netherlands
