= Victor Marijnen =

Prime Minister of the Netherlands from 1963 to 1965

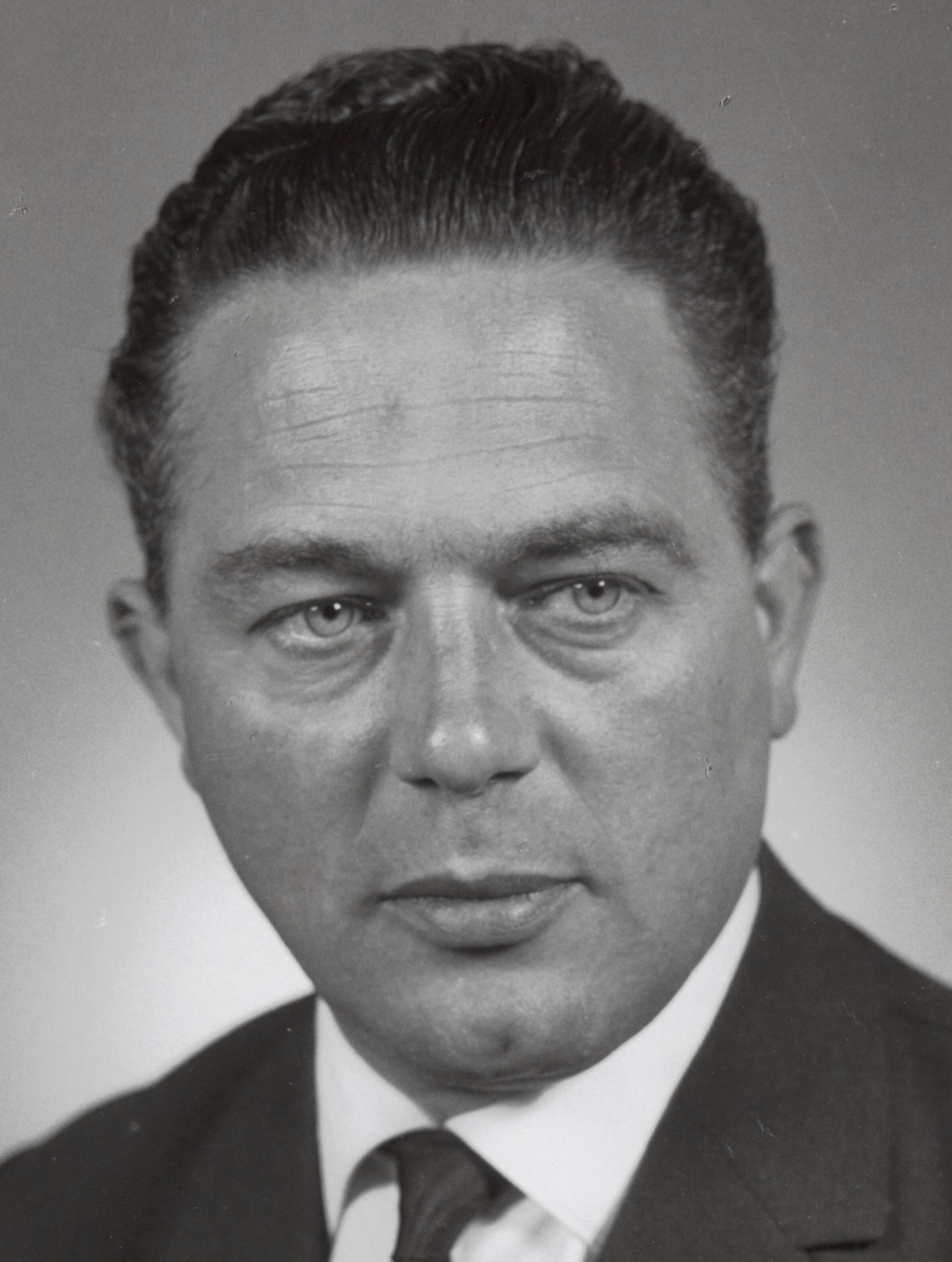
- Marijnen in 1963

Prime Minister of the Netherlands
- In office 24 July 1963 – 14 April 1965
- Monarch: Juliana
- Deputy: Barend Biesheuvel
- Preceded by: Jan de Quay
- Succeeded by: Jo Cals

Mayor of The Hague
- In office 16 October 1968 – 5 April 1975
- Preceded by: Hans Kolfschoten
- Succeeded by: Gerard Wallis de Vries (ad interim)

Chairman of the Rijnmond Council
- In office 20 May 1965 – 16 October 1968
- Preceded by: Office established
- Succeeded by: Willem Fibbe

Member of the House of Representatives
- In office 27 April 1965 – 14 January 1966
- In office 2 July 1963 – 24 July 1963

Minister of Social Affairs and Health
- In office 3 July 1961 – 17 July 1961; Ad interim
- Prime Minister: Jan de Quay
- Preceded by: Charles van Rooy
- Succeeded by: Gerard Veldkamp

Minister of Agriculture and Fisheries
- In office 19 May 1959 – 24 July 1963
- Prime Minister: Jan de Quay
- Preceded by: Kees Staf as Minister of Agriculture, Fisheries and Food Supplies
- Succeeded by: Barend Biesheuvel

Member of the Social and Economic Council
- In office 1 November 1957 – 19 May 1959
- Chairman: Frans de Vries (1957–1958); Gerard Verrijn Stuart (1958–1959)

Personal details
- Born: Victor Gerard Marie Marijnen; 21 February 1917 Arnhem, Netherlands
- Died: 5 April 1975 (aged 58) The Hague, Netherlands
- Party: Catholic People's Party (from 1945)
- Other political affiliations: Roman Catholic State Party (until 1945)
- Spouse: Mini Schreurs (m. 1944)
- Children: 4 sons and 2 daughters
- Education: Radboud University Nijmegen (LL.B., LL.M.); Rotterdam School of Economics (BEc)
- Occupation: Politician · Civil servant · Jurist · Economist · Trade association executive · Nonprofit director

Victor Gerard Marie Marijnen (21 February 1917 – 5 April 1975) was a Dutch politician of the Catholic People's Party (KVP) and jurist who served as Prime Minister of the Netherlands from 24 July 1963 until 14 April 1965.

Marijnen studied Law at the Radboud University Nijmegen obtaining a Master of Laws degree followed by a postgraduate education in Agricultural economics at the Rotterdam School of Economics where he obtained a Bachelor of Economics degree. Marijnen worked as a civil servant for the Ministries of Economic Affairs and Agriculture and Fisheries from August 1941 until November 1957 and as a trade association executive for the Christian Farmers and Gardeners association (CBTB) February 1949 until April 1951 and for the Catholic Employers association (AKWV) from November 1957 until May 1959. After the 1959 general election Marijnen was appointed as Minister of Agriculture and Fisheries in the De Quay cabinet, taking office on 19 May 1959. After the 1963 general election, Marijnen was asked to lead a new cabinet and following a successful cabinet formation formed the Marijnen cabinet and became Prime Minister of the Netherlands, taking office on 24 July 1963.

The cabinet fell just 19 months into its term and he was not offered a post in the new cabinet. Marijnen left office upon the installation of the Cals cabinet on 14 April 1965 but returned as a member of the House of Representatives, serving as a backbencher from 27 April 1965 until his resignation on 14 January 1966. Marijnen also became active in the public sector as a non-profit director and served on several state commissions and councils on behalf of the government. Marijnen continued to be active in politics and in September 1968 was nominated as the Mayor of The Hague, taking office on 16 October 1968. On 5 April 1975 Marijnen died after suffering a fatal heart attack at his home at the age of just 58.

Marijnen was known for his abilities as a skilful manager and effective consensus builder. During his premiership, his cabinet was responsible for several major reforms to health insurance, the public broadcasting system and dealing with the fallout of the marriage between Princess Irene and carlist Carlos Hugo of Bourbon-Parma. He holds the distinction as the last Prime Minister to have served as Mayor and his premiership is consistently regarded both by scholars and the public to have been below average.

== Biography ==
=== Early life ===
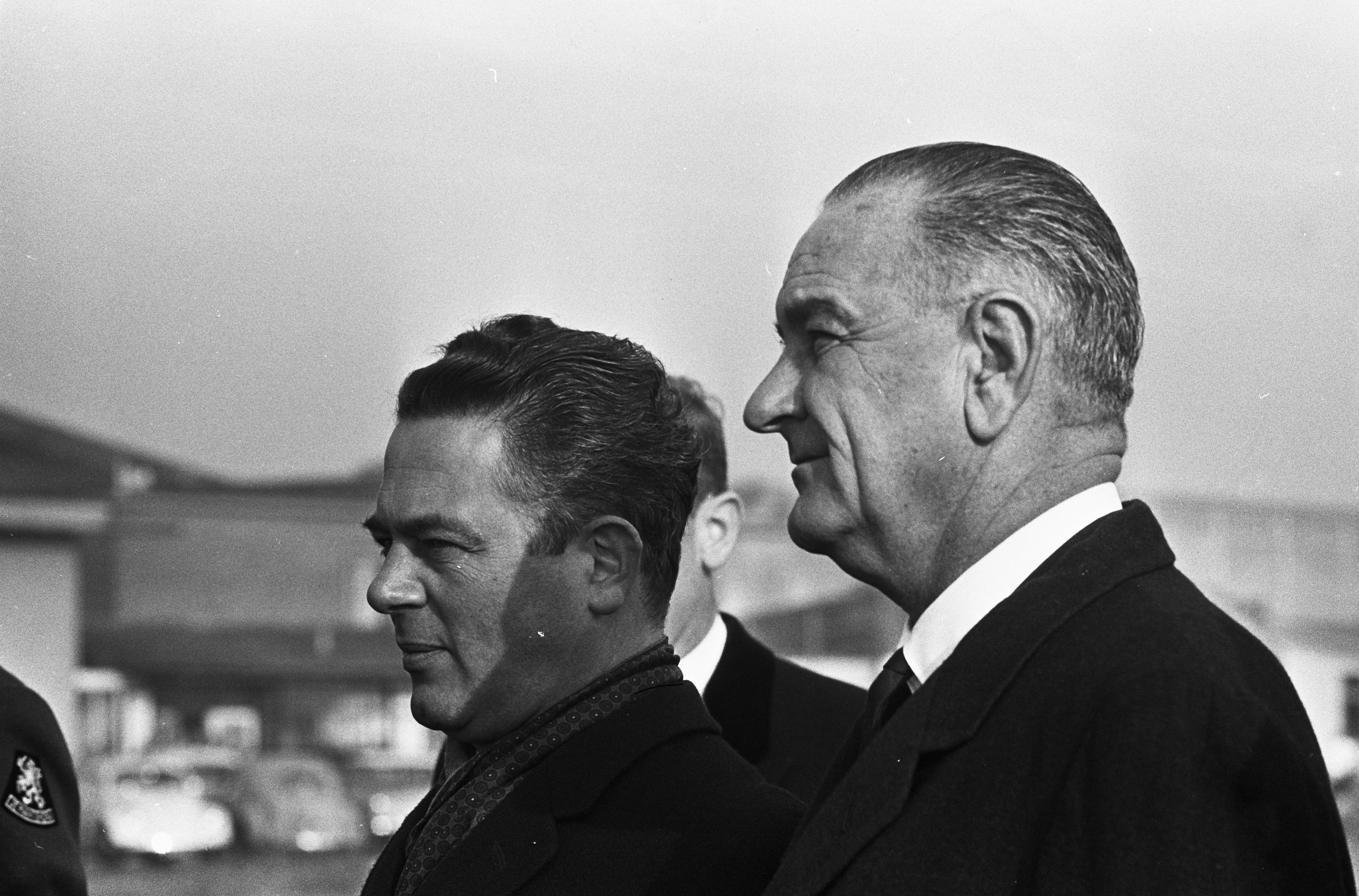
Prime Minister Victor Marijnen and Vice President of the United States Lyndon B. Johnson at Ypenburg Airport on 5 November 1963.

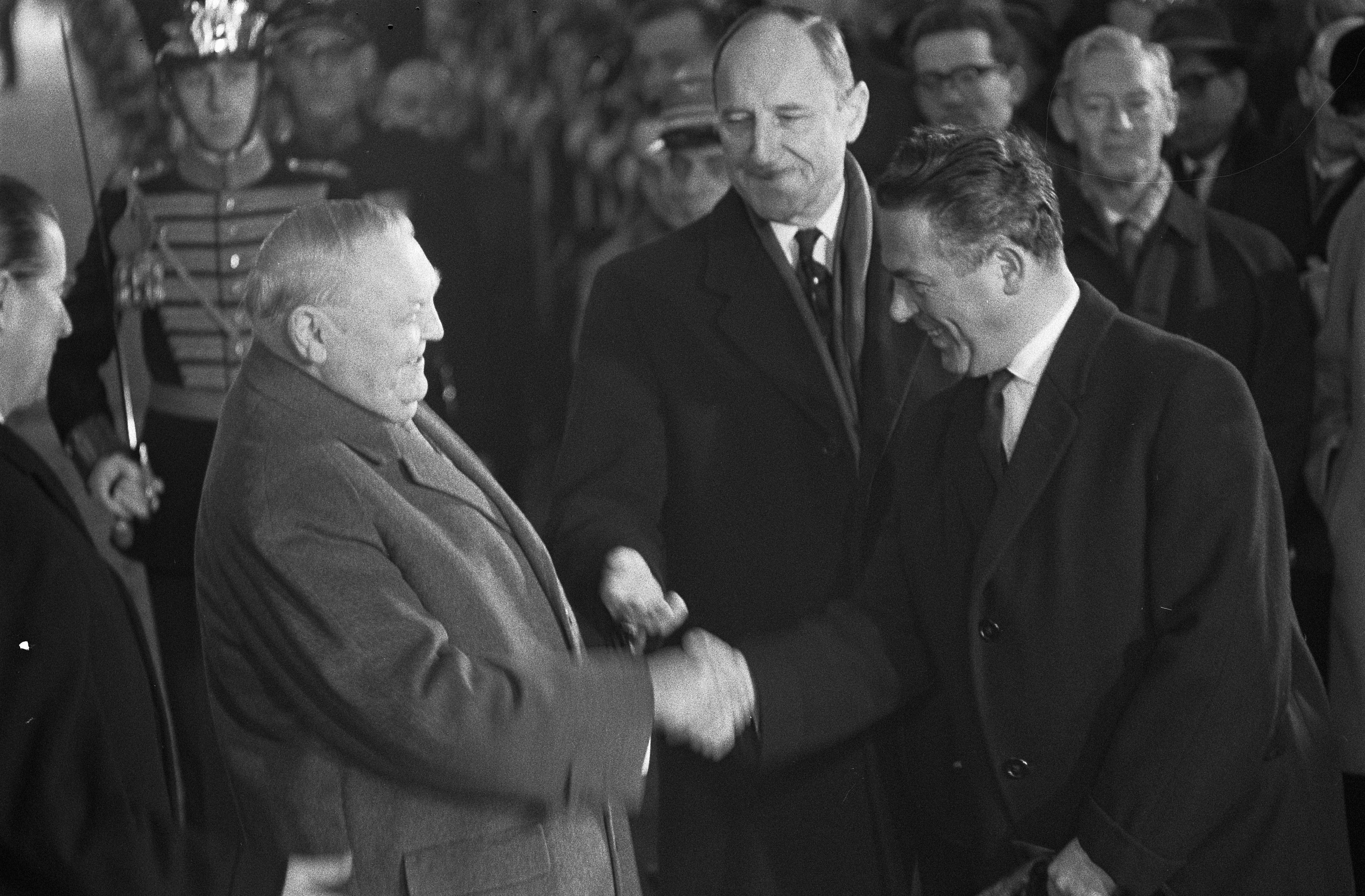
Chancellor of West Germany Ludwig Erhard and Prime Minister Victor Marijnen at the Catshuis on 2 March 1964.

Victor Gerard Marie Marijnen was born in Arnhem on 21 February 1917. In 1941 he graduated in law from the Radboud University Nijmegen and went on to work in the accountancy divisions of the Ministry of Agriculture, Nature and Food Quality. In 1945 he was seconded to the Council for the Restitution of Legal Rights.

In 1949 Marijnen became secretary of the Agricultural Society and in 1951 Secretary-General of the Foreign Agricultural Trade Department of the Ministry of Agriculture, Nature and Food Quality. From 1957 he was secretary of the General Catholic Employers Association and the Catholic Federation of Employers Associations.

==== Accusations regarding priests ====
In 1956 Marijnen was chairman of a children's home in Gelderland where children, including Henk Heithuis, were sexually abused by priests. According to the Telegraph newspaper, reporting in March 2012, he "intervened to have prison sentences dropped against several priests convicted of abusing children." The Dutch Catholic Church organised the castration of Heithuis while he lived at the Gelderland children's home in 1956 after he reported being sexually abused to the police.

=== Politics ===
In the De Quay cabinet, Marijnen was Minister of Agriculture and Fisheries. He served as Prime Minister of the Netherlands from 24 July 1963 until 14 April 1965.

The natural gas reserves, recently found in Slochteren were a considerable boost for the economy. This, combined with labour shortage led to a rise in wages and the attraction of foreign workers. Despite this being the second cabinet without socialist Labour Party, the building up of a welfare state, that was started after World War II, continued with the introduction of minimum wages in 1964 and the national health service. In 1965, measures were taken against commercial television stations transmitting from the North Sea. The cabinet finally fell over the issue if commercial TV should be allowed in the Netherlands.

From 1965 to 1966 Marijnen was a member of the House of Representatives and concurrently chairman of the Board of the Rijnmond Authority. In 1967 he was also appointed chairman of the Post and Telecommunications Council. On 16 October 1968 he was selected Mayor of The Hague.

Marijnen died on 5 April 1975 in The Hague, while serving as Mayor, from a heart attack at the age of 58.

== Decorations ==
Honours
Ribbon bar	Honour	Country	Date
	Grand Officer of the Order of Orange-Nassau	Netherlands	20 April 1965

Political offices
Preceded by Kees Staf	Minister of Agriculture and Fisheries; 1959–1963	Succeeded by Barend Biesheuvel
Preceded by Charles van Rooy	Minister of Social Affairs and Health; Ad interim 1961	Succeeded by Gerard Veldkamp
Preceded by Jan de Quay	Prime Minister of the Netherlands; Minister of General Affairs; 1963–1965	Succeeded by Jo Cals
Preceded by Hans Kolfschoten	Mayor of The Hague; 1968–1975	Succeeded by Gerard Wallis de Vries; Ad interim
Civic offices
Unknown	Deputy Director-General of the Department for Agricultural Trade of the Ministry of Agriculture, Fisheries and Food Supplies; 1951–1953	Unknown
Unknown	Director-General of the Department for Agricultural Trade of the Ministry of Agriculture, Fisheries and Food Supplies; 1953–1957	Unknown
Unknown	Chairman of the Advisory Council for Spatial Planning; 1965–1968	Unknown
New office	Chairman of the Rijnmond Council; 1965–1968	Succeeded by Willem Fibbe
Business positions
Unknown	General-Secretary of the Catholic Employers association 1957–1959	Unknown
Academic offices
Unknown	Chairman of the Education board of the Radboud University Nijmegen; 1965–1972	Unknown
