= Aaldonk =

Place in Limburg, Netherlands

- Buurtschap
- Location within Limburg, Netherlands Location within Netherlands Location within Europe
- Coordinates: 51°42′42″N 5°59′29″E
- Country: Netherlands
- Province: Limburg
- Municipality: Gennep

Aaldonk is a small area with just a dozen houses. It is part of the municipality of Gennep (in the province of Limburg, the Netherlands). Most of the area is agricultural, closely linked to the nearby village of Ottersum. It is also on the other side of 'de Panoven', another agricultural area. Aaldonk was one of the villages that was taken in the Battle of Reichswald by the Derbyshire Yeomanry on 9 February 1945.
