= Jeltien Kraaijeveld-Wouters =

Dutch politician (1932–2025)

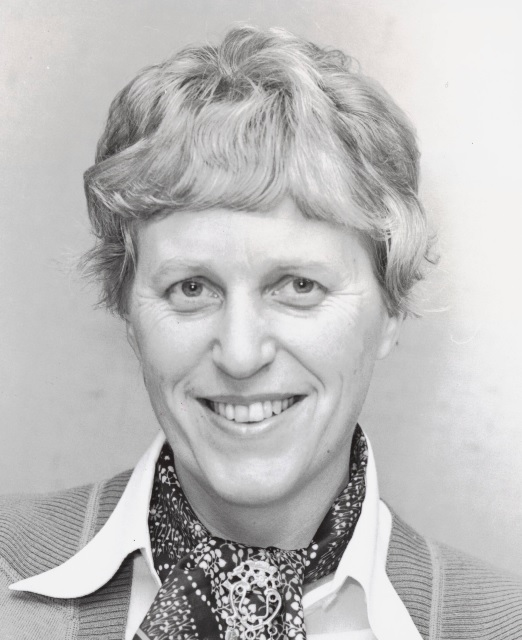
- Kraaijeveld-Wouters in 1977

Mayor of Hilversum
- In office 1 November 1988 – 1 December 1997
- Preceded by: Wietze van der Sluis
- Succeeded by: Ernst Bakker

State Secretary for Culture, Recreation and Social Work
- In office 28 December 1977 – 9 September 1981 Serving with Gerard Wallis de Vries
- Prime Minister: Dries van Agt
- Preceded by: Wim Meijer
- Succeeded by: Hans de Boer

Member of the House of Representatives
- In office 10 June 1981 – 1 November 1988
- Parliamentary group: Christian Democratic Appeal
- In office 7 March 1973 – 28 December 1977
- Parliamentary group: Anti-Revolutionary Party

Personal details
- Born: Jeltje Gesina Kraaijeveld; 4 November 1932 Soest, Netherlands
- Died: 11 June 2025 (aged 92) Hilversum, Netherlands
- Party: Christian Democratic Appeal (from 1980)
- Other political affiliations: Anti-Revolutionary Party (until 1980)
- Occupation: Politician; Nonprofit director; Teacher

Jeltje Gesina "Jeltien" Kraaijeveld-Wouters (4 November 1932 – 11 June 2025) was a Dutch politician. A member of the Anti-Revolutionary Party and subsequently the Christian Democratic Appeal, she served in the House of Representatives from 1973 to 1977 and again from 1981 to 1988.

Kraaijeveld-Wouters died in Hilversum on 11 June 2025, at the age of 92.

Political offices
Preceded by Wim Meijer	State Secretary for Culture, Recreation and Social Work; 1977–1981; Served alongside: Gerard Wallis de Vries	Succeeded by Hans de Boer
Preceded by Wietze van der Sluis	Mayor of Hilversum; 1988–1997	Succeeded by Ernst Bakker
