= Henk Vonhoff =

Dutch politician (1931–2010)

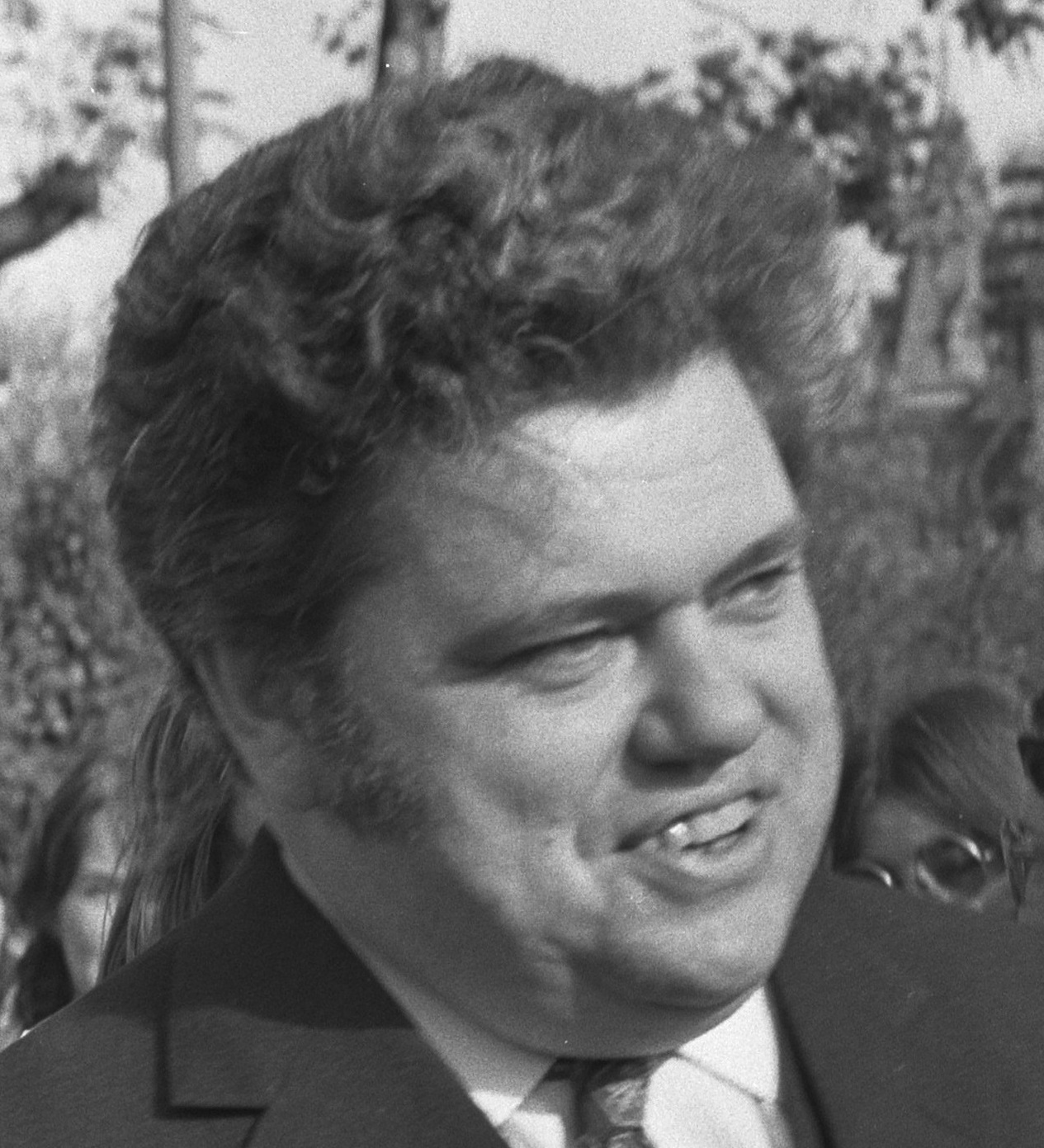
- Henk Vonhoff in 1971

President of the Dutch Olympic Committee
- In office 21 May 1985 – 27 January 1989
- Preceded by: Jaap van der Krol
- Succeeded by: Wouter Huibregtsen

Queen's Commissioner of Groningen
- In office 16 December 1980 – 1 July 1996
- Monarch: Beatrix
- Preceded by: Edzo Toxopeus
- Succeeded by: Hans Alders

Mayor of Utrecht
- In office 6 September 1974 – 16 December 1980
- Preceded by: Henk Zeevalking (Acting)
- Succeeded by: James van Lidth de Jeude (Ad interim)

State Secretary for Culture, Recreation and Social Work
- In office 28 July 1971 – 23 April 1973 Serving with Fia van Veenendaal- van Meggelen (1971–1972)
- Prime Minister: Barend Biesheuvel
- Preceded by: Hein van de Poel
- Succeeded by: Wim Meijer

Member of the House of Representatives
- In office 23 January 1973 – 6 September 1974
- In office 23 February 1967 – 28 July 1971
- Parliamentary group: People's Party for Freedom and Democracy

Personal details
- Born: Hendrik Johan Lubert Vonhoff; 22 June 1931 Amsterdam, Netherlands
- Died: 25 July 2010 (aged 79) Hilversum, Netherlands
- Party: People's Party for Freedom and Democracy (from 1948)
- Other political affiliations: Freedom Party (1946–1948)
- Spouse: Louise Vonhoff-Luijendijk (m. 1953)
- Children: 2 daughter and 1 son
- Relatives: Theo van Gogh (nephew)
- Education: State Civic School of Amsterdam (Bachelor of Education)
- Occupation: Politician · Civil servant · Historian · Teacher · Businessman · Corporate director · Nonprofit director · Trade association executive · Sport administrator · Lobbyist · Author · Professor

Hendrik "Henk" Johan Lubert Vonhoff (22 June 1931 – 25 July 2010) was a Dutch politician of the People's Party for Freedom and Democracy (VVD) and teacher.

== Biography ==
Vonhoff attended the State Civic School of Amsterdam in Amsterdam from April 1950 until May 1957 majoring in Education obtaining a Bachelor of Education degree. Vonhoff worked as a history teacher in Amsterdam from June 1957 until February 1967 and as a political consultant for the People's Party for Freedom and Democracy from January 1952 until February 1967 and as a political pundit for De Telegraaf and Elsevier from March 1959 until February 1967.

Vonhoff was elected as a Member of the House of Representatives after the election of 1967, taking office on 23 February 1967 serving as a frontbencher and spokesperson for Education, Social Work, Military Personnel and deputy spokesperson for Culture, Media and Kingdom Relations. After the election of 1971 Vonhoff was appointed as State Secretary for Culture, Recreation and Social Work in the Cabinet Biesheuvel I, taking office on 28 July 1971. The Cabinet Biesheuvel I fell just one year later on 19 July 1972 after the Democratic Socialists '70 (DS'70) retracted their support following there dissatisfaction with the proposed budget memorandum to further reduce the deficit and continued to serve in a demissionary capacity until the first cabinet formation of 1972 when it was replaced by the caretaker Cabinet Biesheuvel II with Vonhoff continuing as State Secretary for Culture, Recreation and Social Work, taking office on 9 August 1972. After the election of 1972 Westerterp returned as a Member of the House of Representatives, taking office on 23 January 1973 but he was still serving in the cabinet and because of dualism customs in the constitutional convention of Dutch politics he couldn't serve a dual mandate he subsequently resigned as State Secretary for Culture, Recreation and Social Work on 23 April 1973 and he continued to serve in the House of Representatives as a frontbencher chairing the parliamentary committee for Education and Sciences and spokesperson for Education, Social Work and Culture.

In August 1974 Vonhoff was nominated as Mayor of Utrecht, he resigned as a Member of the House of Representatives the same day he was installed as Mayor, taking office on 6 September 1974. In November 1980 he was nominated as Queen's Commissioner of Groningen, he resigned as Mayor the same day he was installed as Queen's Commissioner, serving from 16 December 1980 until 1 July 1996. Vonhoff also became active in the private sector and public sector and occupied numerous seats as a corporate director and nonprofit director on several boards of directors and supervisory boards (Groninger Museum, University Medical Center Groningen, Radio Netherlands Worldwide, Noordelijk Scheepvaartmuseum and the Royal Library) and served on several state commissions and councils on behalf of the government (Advisory Council for Spatial Planning, Raad voor Cultuur, Cadastre Agency, Hoge Veluwe National Park, Natuurbeschermingsraad, Institute for Sound and Vision and the Public Pension Funds PFZW) and worked as a trade association executive for the Beer and Mineral Water Manufacturers association (BBM) serving as chairman of the executive board from February 1977 until May 1992 and for the Techniek Nederland (MKB) serving as chairman of the executive board from August 1982 until October 1996 and as a sport administrator for the National Olympic Committee (NOC) serving as President of the Dutch Olympic Committee from 21 May 1985 until 27 January 1989. After the election of 1986 Vonhoff was approached as Minister of Defence in the Cabinet Lubbers II but per his own request asked not to be considered for a cabinet post in the new cabinet.

Vonhoff was known for his abilities as a debater and consensus builder. Vonhoff continued to comment on political affairs until his is death at the age of 79 and holds the distinction as the longest-serving Queen's Commissioner of Groningen after World War II with 15 years, 198 days.

== Decorations ==
Honours
Ribbon bar	Honour	Country	Date	Comment
	Knight of the Order of the Netherlands Lion	Netherlands	8 June 1973	
	Commander of the Order of Orange-Nassau	Netherlands	29 April 1987	
	Commander of the Order of the Crown	Belgium	12 December 1988	
	Officer of the Order of the Oak Crown	Luxembourg	14 October 1992	

Awards
Ribbon bar	Awards	Organization	Date	Comment
	Honorary Member	People's Party for Freedom and Democracy	15 May 1998	

Political offices
Preceded by Hein van de Poel	State Secretary for Culture, Recreation and Social Work; 1971–1973; Served alongside: Fia van Veenendaal- van Meggelen (1971–1972)	Succeeded by Wim Meijer
Preceded by Henk Zeevalking; Acting	Mayor of Utrecht; 1974–1980	Succeeded by James van Lidth de Jeude; Ad interim
Preceded by Edzo Toxopeus	Queen's Commissioner of Groningen; 1980–1996	Succeeded by Hans Alders
Sporting positions
Preceded by Jaap van der Krol	President of the Dutch; Olympic Committee; 1985–1989	Succeeded by Wouter Huibregtsen
