= Hans Kolfschoten =

Dutch politician (1903–1984)

His Excellency Hans Kolfschoten
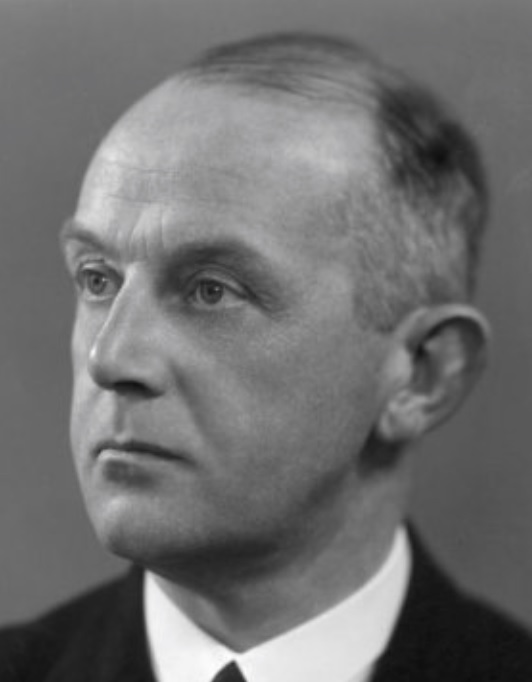
- Hans Kolfschoten in 1952

Mayor of The Hague
- In office 10 February 1957 – 1 November 1968
- Preceded by: Frans Schokking
- Succeeded by: Victor Marijnen

Mayor of Eindhoven
- In office 1 September 1946 – 10 February 1957
- Preceded by: Antoon Verdijk
- Succeeded by: Charles van Rooy

Member of the Senate
- In office 12 July 1949 – 15 July 1952
- In office 23 July 1946 – 27 July 1948

Minister of Justice
- In office 25 June 1945 – 3 July 1946
- Cabinet: Schermerhorn–Drees
- Preceded by: Pieter Sjoerds Gerbrandy
- Succeeded by: Johan van Maarseveen

Personal details
- Born: Henri Anthony Melchior Tieleman Kolfschoten; 17 August 1903 Arnhem, Netherlands
- Died: 2 August 1984 (aged 80) The Hague, Netherlands
- Party: Catholic People's Party (from 1945)
- Other political affiliations: Roman Catholic State Party (until 1945)
- Spouse: Rinske Titia Ferwerda (m. 1932)
- Children: 5 daughters and 1 son
- Education: University of Amsterdam (Bachelor of Laws, Master of Laws)
- Occupation: Politician · Civil servant · Jurist · Corporate director · Nonprofit director

Henri Anthony Melchior Tieleman "Hans" Kolfschoten (17 August 1903 – 2 August 1984) was a Dutch politician of the defunct Catholic People's Party (KVP).

Kolfschoten was minister of Justice, a member of the Senate, and mayor of Eindhoven and The Hague. In 1945, Kolfschoten refused permanent residency to the Polish Jew Chaim Engel and his Dutch wife Selma Engel-Wijnberg, who survived Sobibor extermination camp.

== Decorations ==
Honours
Ribbon bar	Honour	Country	Date	Comment
	Knight of the Order of the Netherlands Lion	Netherlands	31 July 1946	
	Grand Officer of the Order of Orange-Nassau	Netherlands	1 November 1968	Elevated from Commander (30 April 1965)

Political offices
Preceded by Pieter Sjoerds Gerbrandy	Minister of Justice; 1945–1946	Succeeded by Johan van Maarseveen
Preceded by Antoon Verdijk	Mayor of Eindhoven; 1946–1957	Succeeded by Charles van Rooy
Preceded by Frans Schokking	Mayor of The Hague; 1957–1968	Succeeded by Victor Marijnen
Non-profit organization positions
Preceded by Arnold Jan d'Ailly	President of the Association of Municipalities; 1957–1965	Succeeded by Hendrik Wytema
Preceded by Pieter Feith	Chairman of the Heart Foundation; 1977–1981	Succeeded by Willem Pluygers
