= Ernst Bakker =

Dutch politician

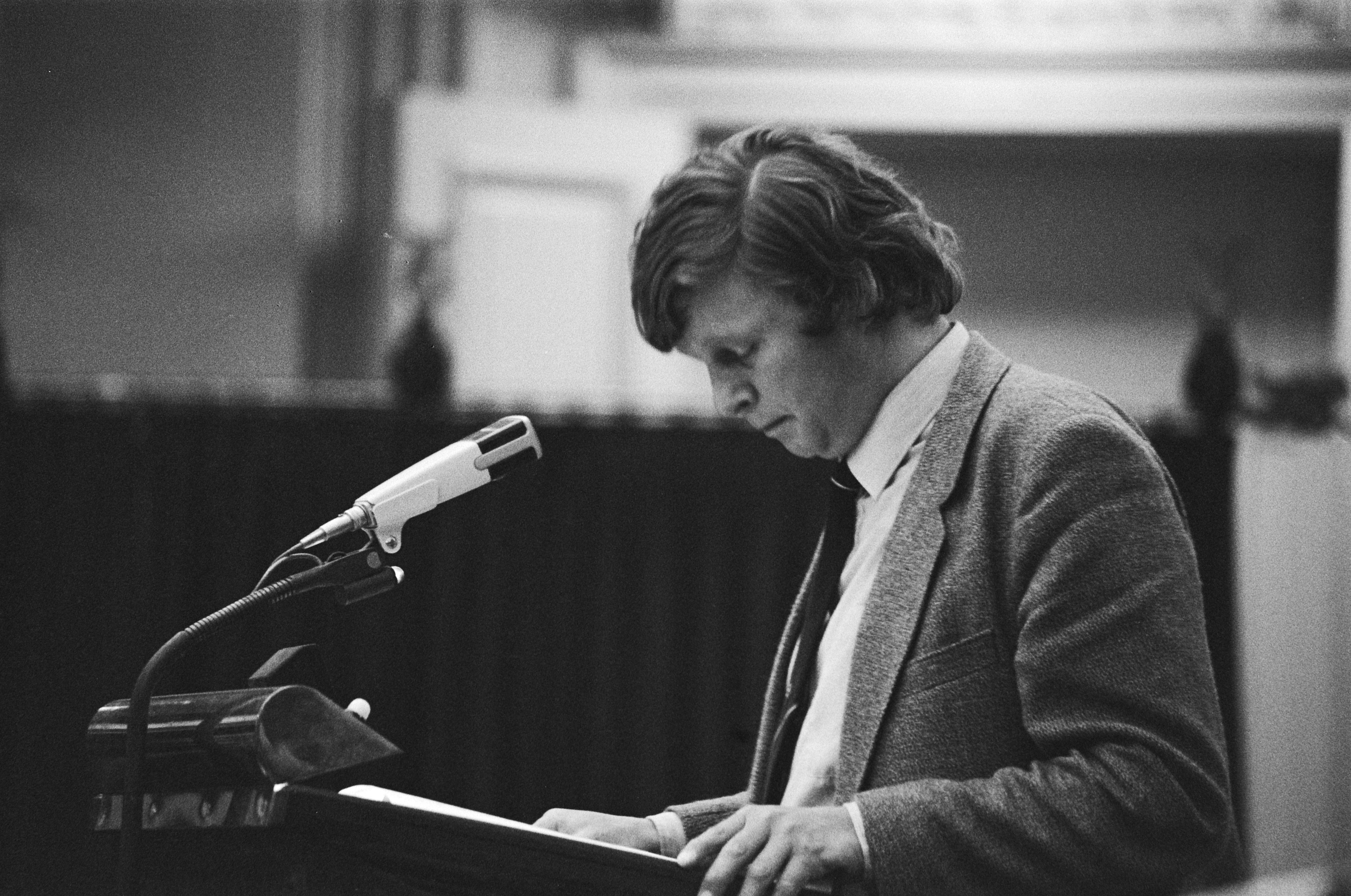
- Bakker in the House of Representatives in 1981

Mayor of Hilversum
- In office 1998–2011
- Preceded by: Jeltien Kraaijeveld-Wouters
- Succeeded by: Pieter Broertjes

Personal details
- Born: 16 April 1946; Hellendoorn, Netherlands
- Died: 8 February 2014 (aged 67); Hilversum, Netherlands
- Political party: Democrats 66

Ernst Carel Bakker (16 April 1946 – 8 February 2014) was a Dutch politician, alderman and member of the Democrats 66 political party. He served as a member of the House of Representatives from 1981 to 1982. He joined the Amsterdam City Council in 1990 before becoming a city alderman beginning in 1992. Bakker relocated to Hilversum in 1998 to become Mayor, a position he held until his retirement in 2011.

Bakker died on 8 February 2014 in Hilversum, at the age of 67.
