= Wim Meijer (Labour Party) =

Dutch politician and businessman (born 1939)

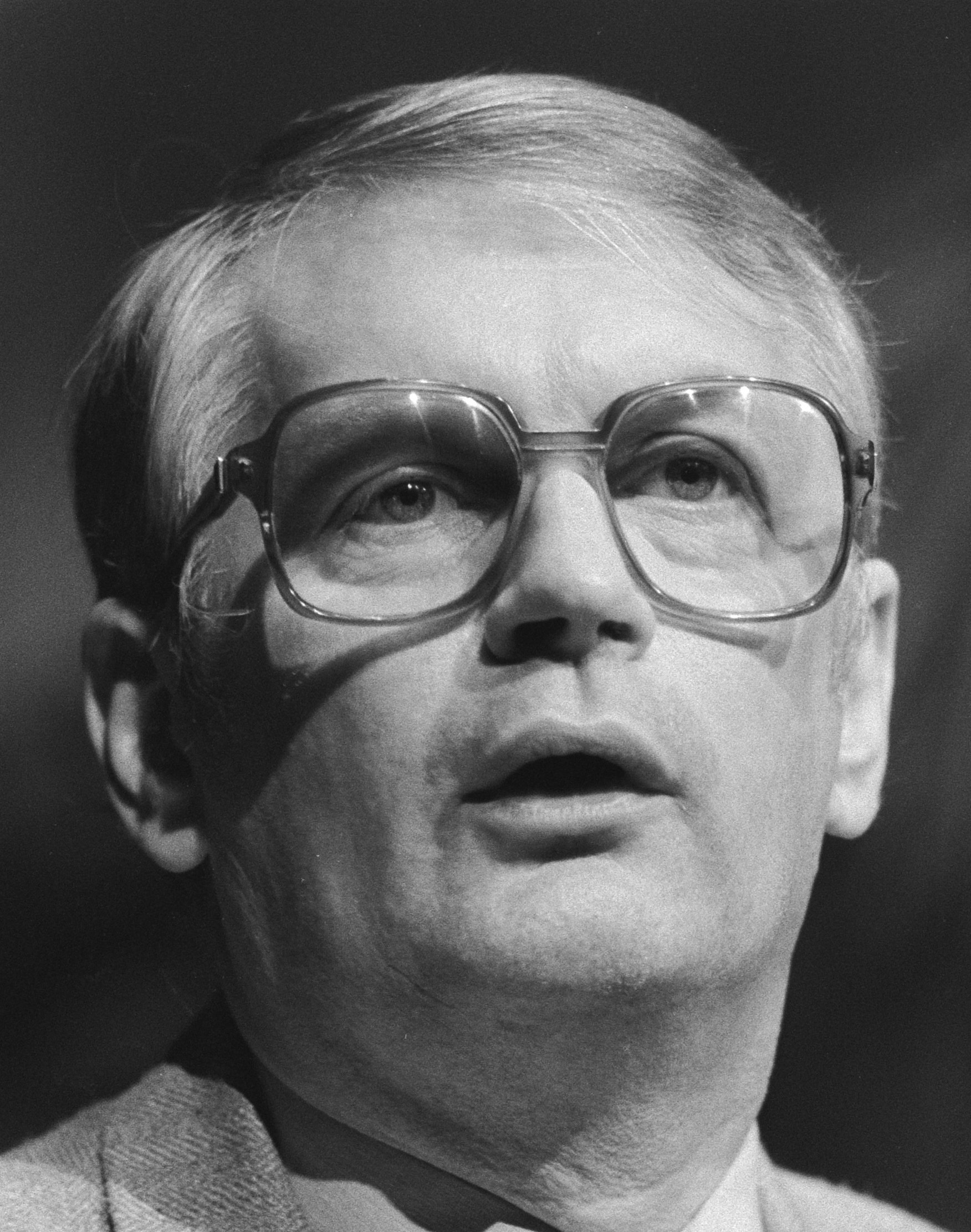
- Meijer in 1981

Queen's Commissioner of Drenthe
- In office 1 January 1989 – 1 January 1993
- Monarch: Beatrix
- Preceded by: Ad Oele
- Succeeded by: Margreeth de Boer

Leader of the Labour Party in the House of Representatives
- In office 11 September 1981 – 16 September 1982
- Preceded by: Joop den Uyl
- Succeeded by: Joop den Uyl

State Secretary for Culture, Recreation and Social Work
- In office 11 May 1973 – 8 September 1977
- Prime Minister: Joop den Uyl
- Preceded by: Henk Vonhoff
- Succeeded by: Jeltien Kraaijeveld-Wouters; Gerard Wallis de Vries

Member of the House of Representatives
- In office 8 June 1977 – 1 January 1989
- In office 11 May 1971 – 11 May 1973

Personal details
- Born: Willem Meijer; 16 August 1939 (age 86) Harkstede, Netherlands
- Party: Labour Party (since 1958)
- Spouses: Betty Smittenberg (divorced) Tjarda Harmsma (divorced) Gerdi Verbeet (m. 2010)
- Children: 1 son, 1 daughter (first marriage); 2 stepsons (third marriage)
- Occupation: Politician · Civil servant · Businessman · Banker · Corporate director · Nonprofit director · Social worker · Activist

Willem "Wim" Meijer (born 16 August 1939) is a retired Dutch politician and businessman. He is a member of the Labour Party (PvdA).

Meijer worked as a social worker in Hengelo from April 1964 until May 1971. Meijer served on the Municipal Council of Hengelo from June 1966 until July 1970. Meijer also was active as a political activist and was one of the leaders of the New Left movement in the Netherlands which aimed to steer the Labour Party more to the Left. Meijer was elected as a Member of the House of Representatives after the election of 1971, taking office on 11 May 1971. After the election of 1972 Meijer was appointed as State Secretary for Culture, Recreation and Social Work in the Cabinet Den Uyl, taking office on 11 May 1973. The Cabinet Den Uyl fell on 22 March 1977 and continued to serve in a demissionary capacity. After the election of 1977 Meijer returned as a Member of the House of Representatives, taking office on 8 June 1977 but he was still serving in the cabinet and because of dualism customs in the constitutional convention of Dutch politics he couldn't serve a dual mandate he subsequently resigned as State Secretary on 8 September 1977. After the election of 1981 the Leader of the Labour Party and Parliamentary leader of the Labour Party in the House of Representatives Joop den Uyl was appointed as Deputy Prime Minister and Minister of Social Affairs and Employment in the Cabinet Van Agt II, Meijer was selected as his successor as Parliamentary leader in the House of Representatives, taking office on 11 September 1981. The Cabinet Van Agt II fell just seven months into its term on 12 May 1982 and continued to serve in a demissionary capacity until it was replaced by the caretaker Cabinet Van Agt III on 29 May 1982. After the election of 1982 Den Uyl subsequently returned as a Member of the House of Representatives and as Parliamentary leader in the House of Representatives on 16 September 1982.

On 14 October 1988 Meijer was nominated as Queen's Commissioner of Drenthe, he resigned as a Member of the House of Representatives the same day he was installed as Queen's Commissioner of Drenthe, taking office on 1 January 1989.

== Decorations ==
Honours
Ribbon bar	Honour	Country	Date	Comment
	Knight of the Order of the Netherlands Lion	Netherlands	11 April 1978	
	Commander of the Order of Orange-Nassau	Netherlands	30 December 1992	

Party political offices
Preceded by Joop den Uyl	Parliamentary leader of the Labour Party in the House of Representatives; 1981–1982	Succeeded by Joop den Uyl
Political offices
Preceded by Henk Vonhoff	State Secretary for Culture, Recreation and Social Work; 1973–1977	Succeeded by Jeltien Kraaijeveld-Wouters
Preceded by Henk Vonhoff	State Secretary for Culture, Recreation and Social Work; 1973–1977	Succeeded by Gerard Wallis de Vries
Preceded by Ad Oele	Queen's Commissioner of Drenthe; 1989–1993	Succeeded by Margreeth de Boer
Civic offices
Preceded by Ruud Lubbers	Chairman of the Supervisory board of the Mine Council; 2002–2016	Succeeded by Co Verdaas
Unknown	Chairman of the Supervisory board of the Chamber of Commerce; 2005–2015	Succeeded by Claudia Zuiderwijk
Business positions
Preceded by Pierre Lardinois	Chairman of the Supervisory board of the Rabobank; 1993–2002	Succeeded by Hans Smits
Unknown	Chairman of the Supervisory board of the Nederlandse Spoorwegen; 2002–2013	Succeeded by Carel van den Driest
