= Fia van Veenendaal-van Meggelen =

Dutch politician (1918–2005)

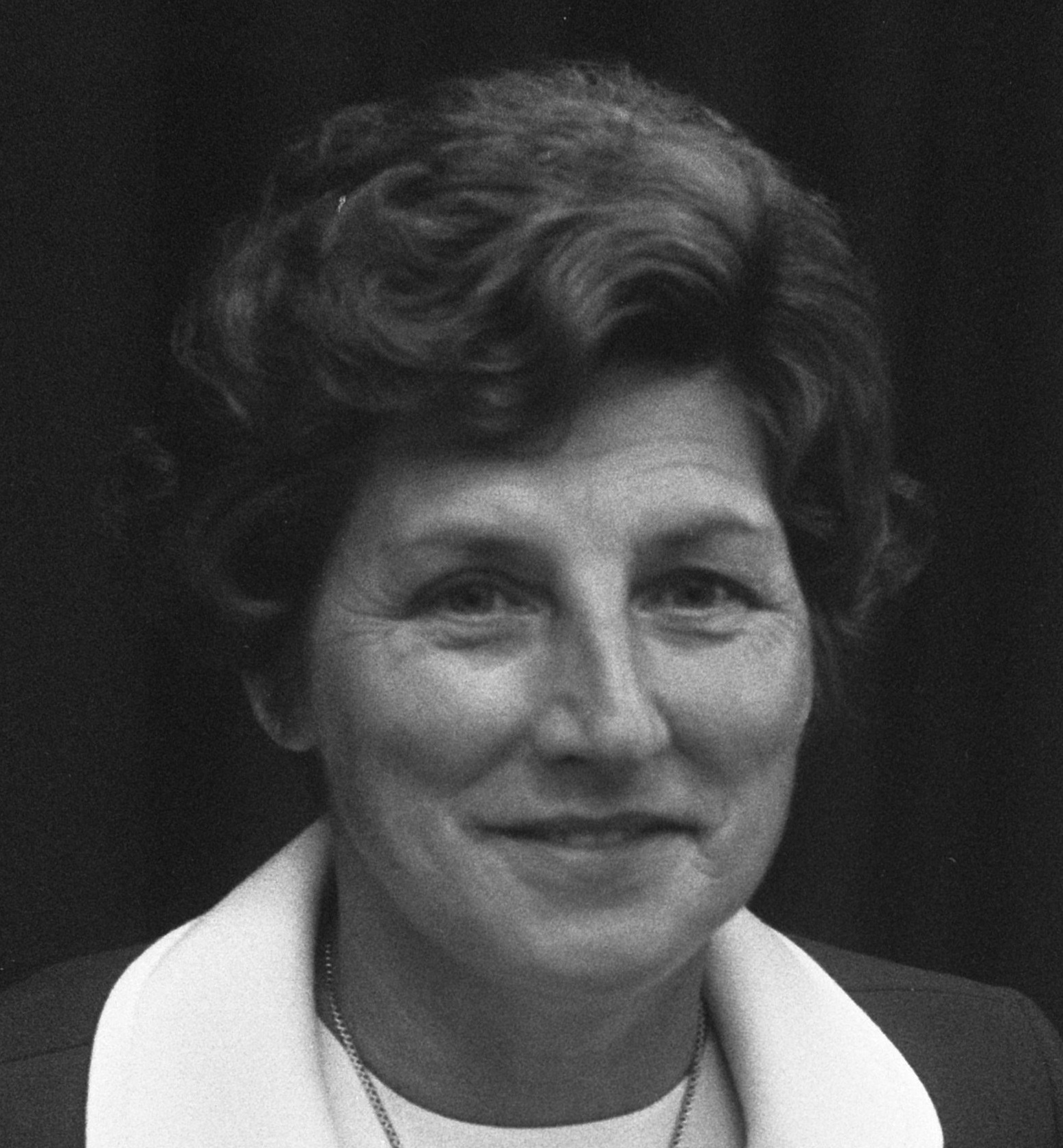
- Van Veenendaal-van Meggelen in 1970

State Secretary for Culture, Recreation and Social Work
- In office 28 July 1971 – 21 July 1972 Serving with Henk Vonhoff
- Prime Minister: Barend Biesheuvel
- Preceded by: Hein van de Poel
- Succeeded by: Henk Vonhoff

Member of the House of Representatives
- In office 7 December 1972 – 8 June 1977
- Parliamentary group: Democratic Socialists '70
- In office 28 July 1970 – 28 July 1971
- Parliamentary group: Democratic Socialists '70 (1970–1971); Independent (1970); Labour Party (1970)

Personal details
- Born: Sophia van Meggelen; 7 April 1918 Strijp, Netherlands
- Died: 21 September 2005 (aged 87) Eindhoven, Netherlands
- Party: Democratic Socialists '70 (from 1970)
- Other political affiliations: Independent (1970); Labour Party (1946–1970); Social Democratic; Workers' Party (1936–1946)
- Spouse: Johannes van Veenendaal (m. 1939)
- Children: 2 daughters and 1 son
- Occupation: Politician; Pedagogue; Corporate director; Nonprofit director; Activist

Sophia "Fia" van Veenendaal-van Meggelen (7 April 1918 – 21 September 2005) was a Dutch politician of the Democratic Socialists '70 (DS'70) party. She served as State Secretary for Culture, Recreation and Social Work from 28 July 1971 until 21 July 1972 in the Cabinet Biesheuvel I and as a Member of the House of Representatives from 28 July 1970 until 28 July 1971 and from 7 December 1972 until 8 June 1977.

Political offices
Preceded by Hein van de Poel	State Secretary for Culture, Recreation and Social Work; 1971–1972; Served alongside: Henk Vonhoff	Succeeded by Henk Vonhoff
