= Charles van Rooy =

Dutch politician (1912–1996)

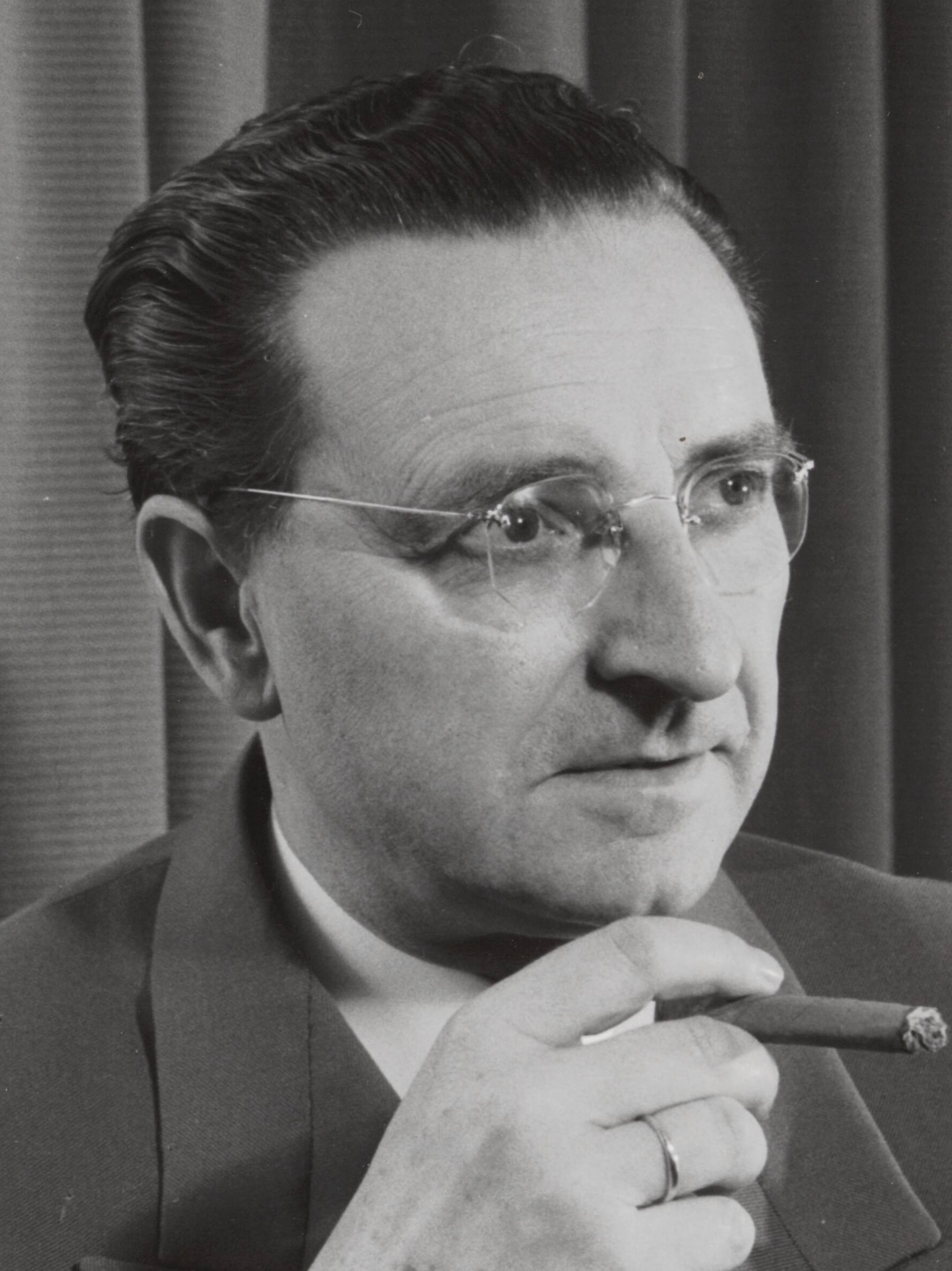
- Charles van Rooy in 1959

Queen's Commissioner of Limburg
- In office 1 January 1964 – 1 February 1977
- Monarch: Juliana
- Preceded by: Frans Houben
- Succeeded by: Sjeng Kremers

Mayor of Heerlen
- In office 16 January 1962 – 1 January 1964
- Preceded by: Marcel van Grunsven
- Succeeded by: Frans Gijzels

Minister of Social Affairs and Health
- In office 19 May 1959 – 3 July 1961
- Prime Minister: Jan de Quay
- Preceded by: Louis Beel
- Succeeded by: Victor Marijnen (Ad interim)

Mayor of Eindhoven
- In office 1 May 1957 – 19 May 1959
- Preceded by: Hans Kolfschoten
- Succeeded by: Herman Witte

Mayor of Venlo
- In office 1 May 1952 – 1 May 1957
- Preceded by: Bernard Berger
- Succeeded by: Leonard de Gou

Mayor of Etten-Leur
- In office 16 December 1945 – 1 May 1952
- Preceded by: Willem Weijers (Ad interim)
- Succeeded by: Jan Godwaldt

Mayor of Hontenisse
- In office 1 November 1944 – 16 December 1945
- Preceded by: Cornelis van der Pijl (Ad interim)
- Succeeded by: Camille van Hootegem
- In office 15 November 1939 – 22 January 1944
- Preceded by: Robert Lambooij
- Succeeded by: Cornelis van der Pijl (Ad interim)

Personal details
- Born: Charles Joan Marie Adriaan van Rooy; 23 January 1912 Rotterdam, Netherlands
- Died: 1 August 1996 (aged 84) Hilversum, Netherlands
- Party: Christian Democratic Appeal (from 1980)
- Other political affiliations: Catholic People's Party (until 1980)
- Spouse: Marie Müller (m. 1939)
- Children: Yvonne van Rooy (born 1951)
- Education: Radboud University Nijmegen (Bachelor of Laws, Master of Laws); Maastricht University (Bachelor of Public Administration, Master of Public Administration, Doctor of Philosophy)
- Occupation: Politician · Civil servant · Jurist · Nonprofit director

Charles Joan Marie Adriaan van Rooy (23 January 1912 – 1 August 1996) was a Dutch politician of the defunct Catholic People's Party (KVP), which is now merged into the Christian Democratic Appeal (CDA).

He started his career as the mayor of Hontenisse on 15 November 1939; on 22 January 1944 he was fired by the Germans and went into hiding. After Hontenisse was freed, he became mayor again in November 1944 till 16 December 1945. Subsequently he became mayor of Etten-Leur (16 December 1945 – 1 May 1952), Venlo (1 May 1952 – 1 May 1957), and Eindhoven (1 May 1957 – 19 May 1959). From 19 May 1959 he served as the minister of social affairs and health under the Catholic prime minister Jan de Quay, his friendship with De Quay was probably one of the reasons he unexpectedly became minister. His career as a minister ended after only two years (3 July 1961), after his child benefit plans were met with great criticism. His continued his political career as mayor of Heerlen (16 January 1962 – 1 January 1964) and ended it as governor of Limburg (1 January 1964 – 1 February 1977).

== Decorations ==
Honours
Ribbon bar	Honour	Country	Date	Comment
	Knight of the Order of the Netherlands Lion	Netherlands	1 October 1961	
	Grand Officer of the Order of Orange-Nassau	Netherlands	1 February 1977	Elevated from Officer (30 April 1954)

Political offices
Preceded by Robert Lambooij	Mayor of Hontenisse; 1939–1944; 1944–1945	Succeeded by Cornelis van der Pijl; Ad interim
Preceded by Cornelis van der Pijl; Ad interim	Mayor of Hontenisse; 1939–1944; 1944–1945	Succeeded by Camille van Hootegem
Preceded by Willem Weijers; Ad interim	Mayor of Etten-Leur; 1945–1952	Succeeded by Jan Godwaldt
Preceded by Bernard Berger	Mayor of Venlo; 1952–1957	Succeeded by Leonard de Gou
Preceded by Hans Kolfschoten	Mayor of Eindhoven; 1957–1959	Succeeded by Herman Witte
Preceded by Louis Beel	Minister of Social Affairs and Health; 1959–1961	Succeeded by Victor Marijnen; Ad interim
Preceded by Marcel van Grunsven	Mayor of Heerlen; 1962–1964	Succeeded by Frans Gijzels
Preceded by Frans Houben	Queen's Commissioner of Limburg; 1964–1977	Succeeded by Sjeng Kremers
