= Gennep =

- Municipality
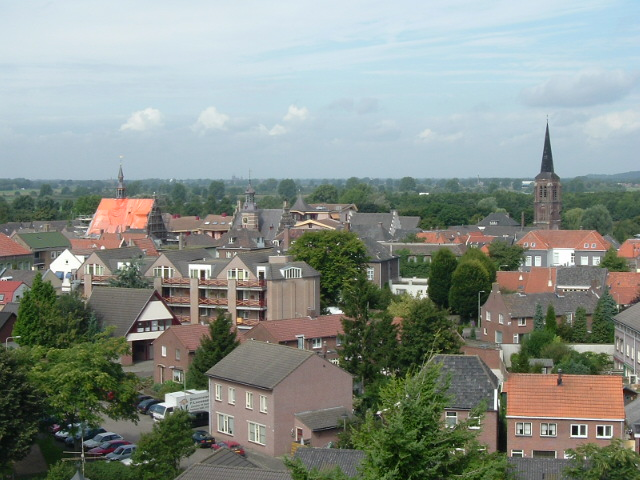
- View over Gennep

- Flag Coat of arms

- Location in Limburg
- Coordinates: 51°42′N 5°58′E
- Country: Netherlands
- Province: Limburg

Government
  - Body: Municipal council
  - Mayor: Peter de Koning (VVD)

Area
  - Total: 50.42 km^{2} (19.47 sq mi)
  - Land: 47.62 km^{2} (18.39 sq mi)
  - Water: 2.80 km^{2} (1.08 sq mi)
- Elevation: 13 m (43 ft)

Population (January 2021)
  - Total: 17,035
  - Density: 358/km^{2} (930/sq mi)
- Demonym(s): Gennepenaar, Genneper
- Time zone: UTC+1 (CET)
  - Summer (DST): UTC+2 (CEST)
- Postcode: 6590–6599
- Area code: 0485
- Website: www.gennep.nl

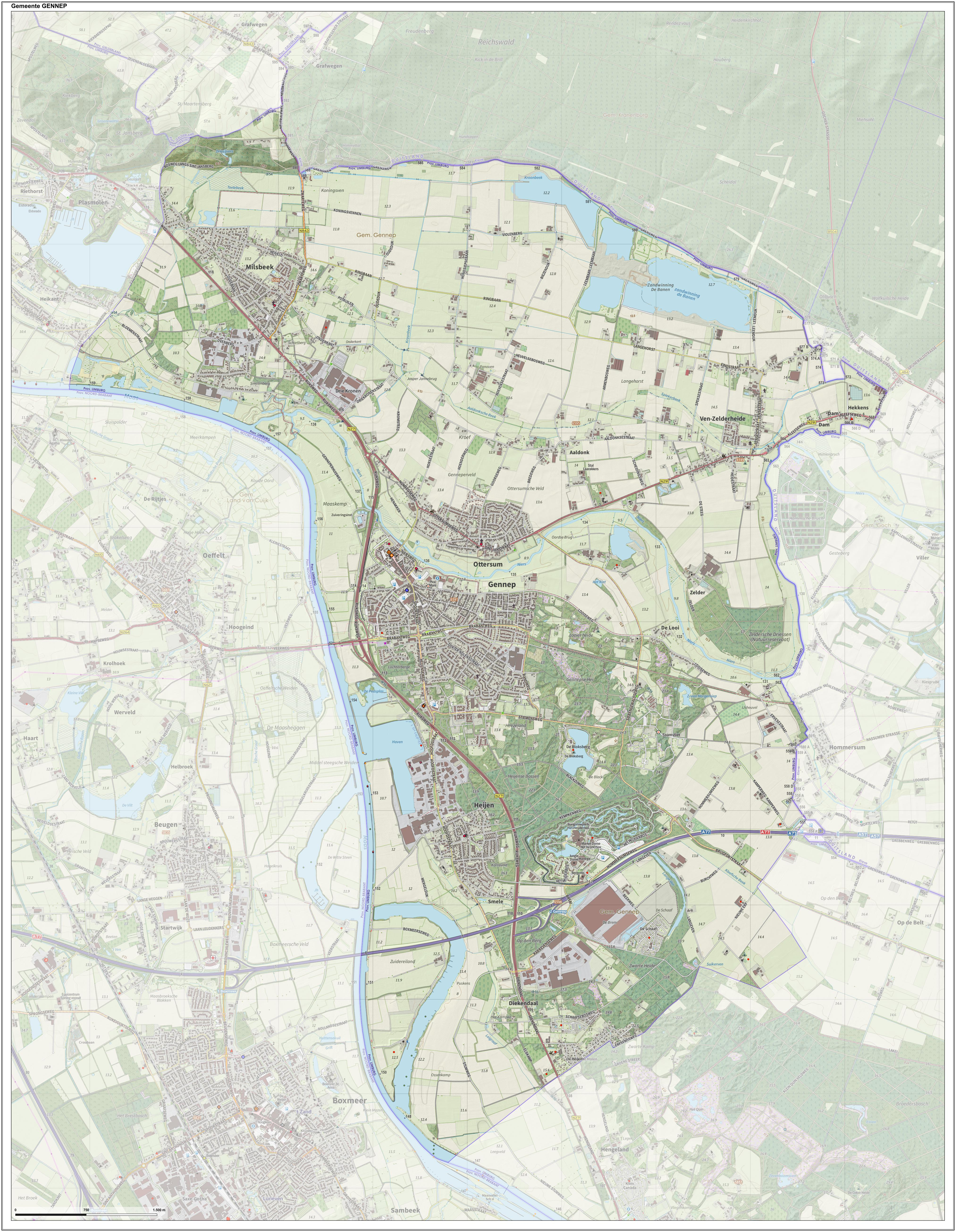
Dutch topographic map of the municipality of Gennep, June 2015

Gennep (Dutch pronunciation: [ˈɣɛnəp]) is a municipality and a city in upper southeastern Netherlands. It lies in the very northern part of the province of Limburg, 18 km south of Nijmegen. Furthermore, it lies on the right bank of the Meuse river, and south of the forest of the Klever Reichswald. The municipality of Gennep has 17,277 inhabitants (2014).

The Niers river flows into the Meuse in Gennep.

== Population centres ==
- Aaldonk
- Dam
- De Looi
- Diekendaal
- Gennep
- Heijen
- Hekkens
- Milsbeek
- Ottersum
- Smele
- Ven-Zelderheide
- Zelder

== The city of Gennep ==
Gennep was the title of a comital family, known descendants of which are the famous Saint Norbert of Gennep and William of Gennep, Archbishop-Elector of Cologne.

Gennep probably received city rights in 1371. However, it remains unclear whether these city rights have really been assigned to Gennep, as the supposed documents burned during a fire in the townhall of Gennep at the end of the 16th century. Gennep lies about 18 kilometres (11 miles) southeast of Nijmegen.

In 2001, Gennep had 8306 inhabitants. The built-up area of the town was 2.11 square kilometres (0.81 sq mi), and contained 3124 residences.

== International relations ==
=== Twin towns — Sister cities ===
Gennep is twinned with:

- Gelnica, Slovakia

== Notable people ==
- Norbert of Xanten, Catholic priest and ascetic, was born in Gennep
- Marcel van Grunsven (1896 in Gennep - 1969) Mayor of Heerlen from 1926 to 1961
- Theo Blankenaauw (1923 in Gennep – 2011) a Dutch track cyclist, competed at the 1948 Summer Olympics

== Gallery ==
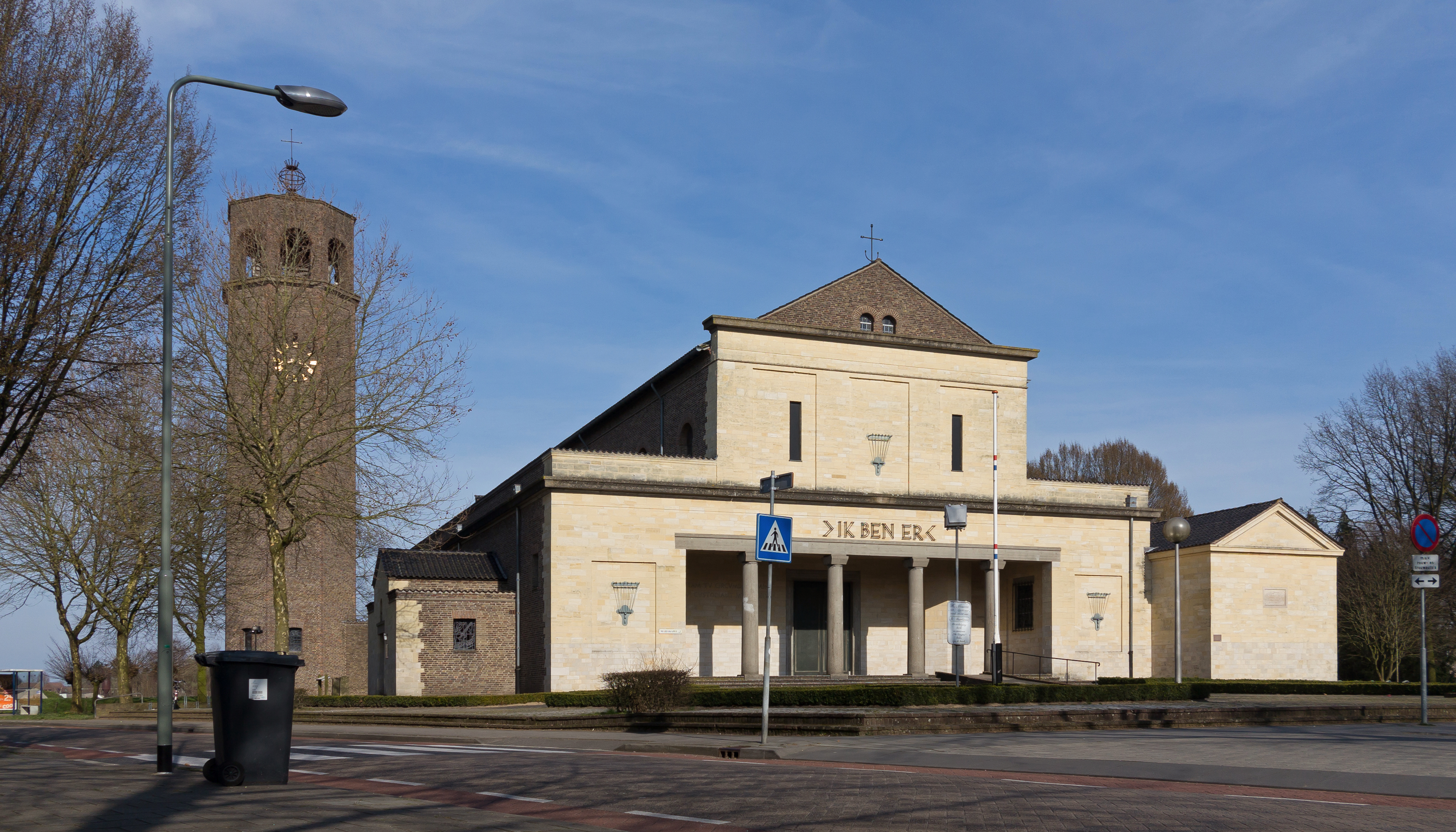
Gennep, church: de Sint Martinuskerk

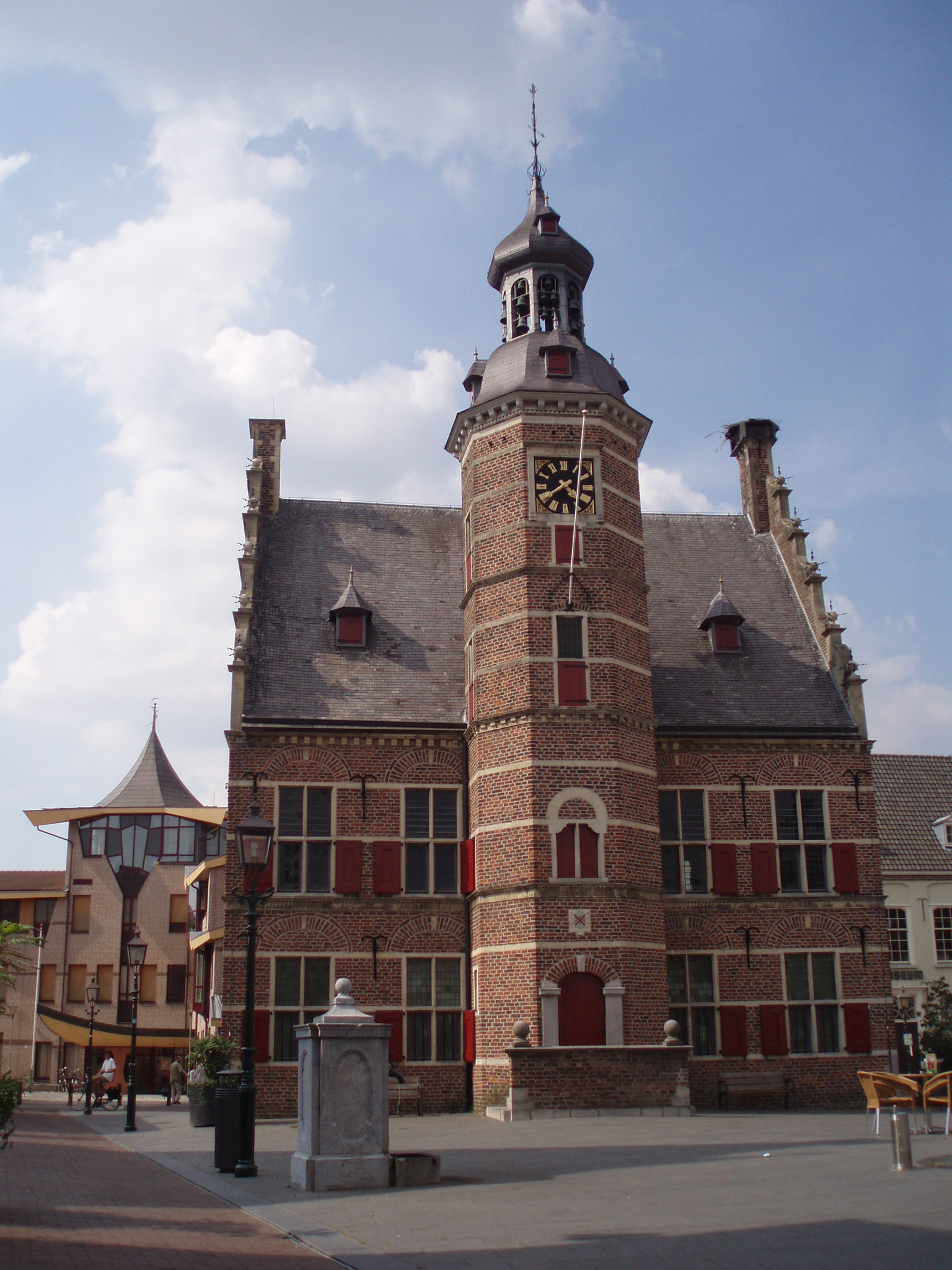
Gennep, former town hall
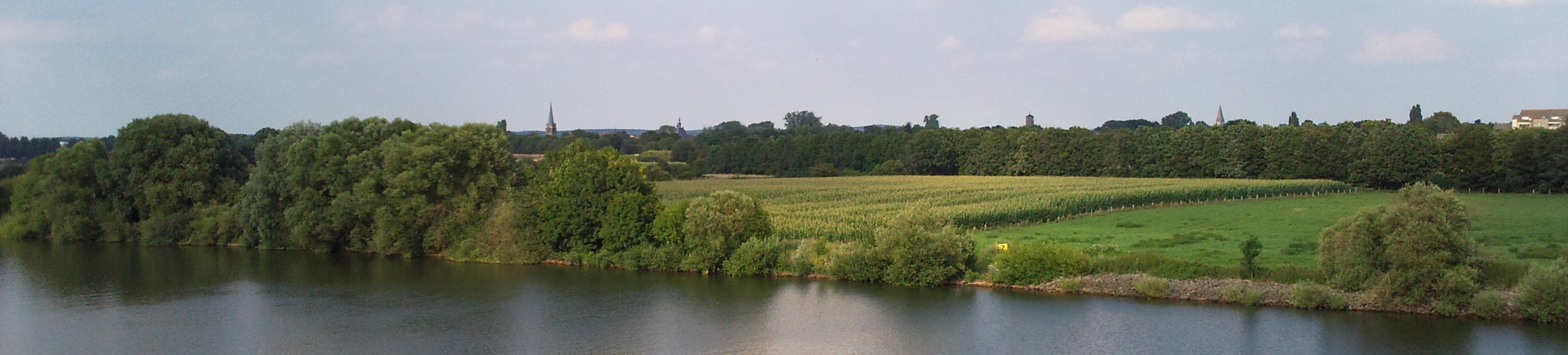
View of the river Meuse, between Gennep and Ottersum
