= Pieter Broertjes =

Dutch journalist and politician

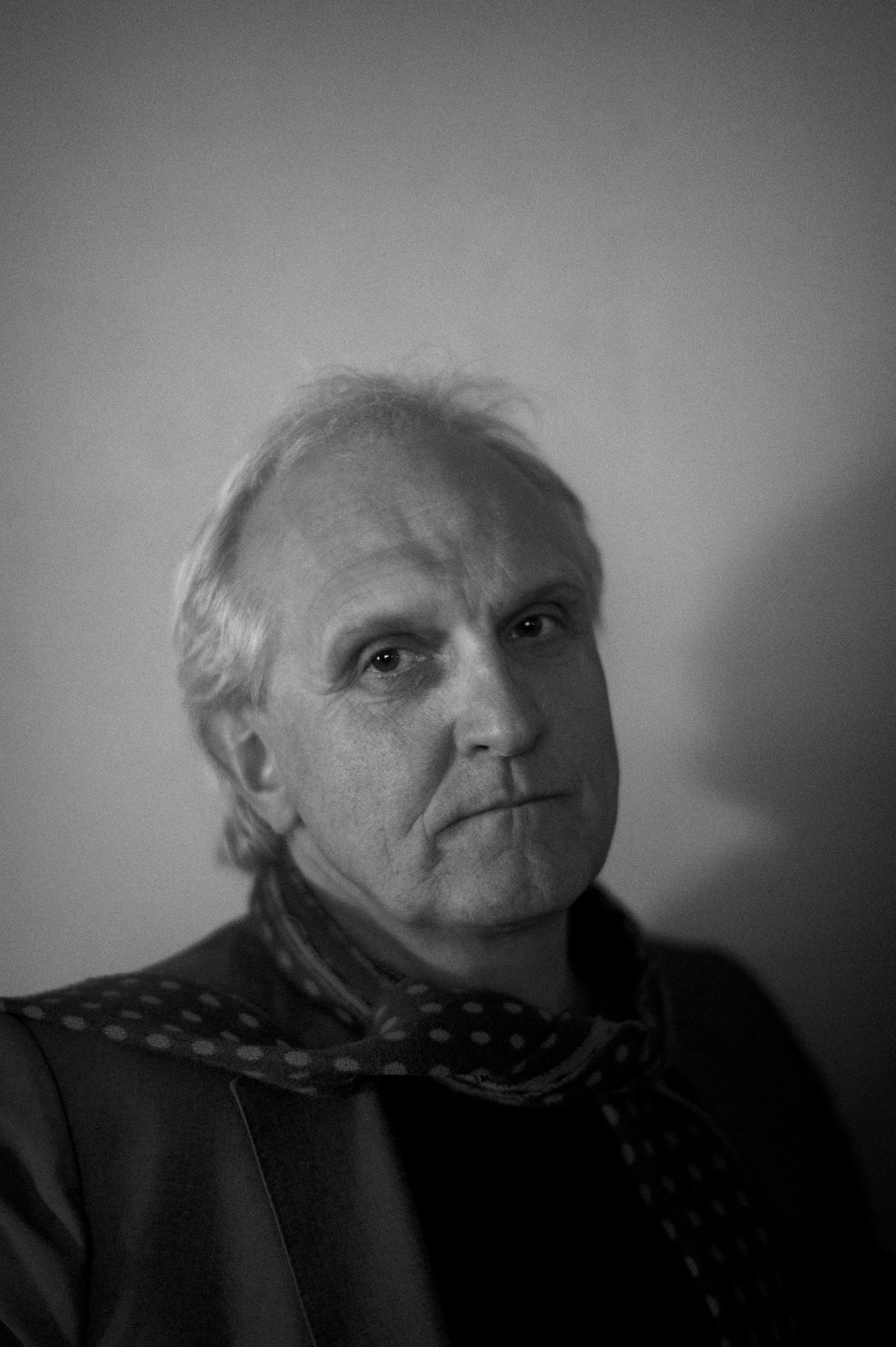

Mayor of Hilversum
- Incumbent
- Assumed office 1 July 2011
- Preceded by: Ernst Bakker

Personal details
- Born: Pieter Izak Broertjes; 20 September 1952 (age 73) The Hague, Netherlands
- Party: Labour Party
- Education: Utrecht University (Master of Science)
- Occupation: Journalist editor-in-chief author
- Website: Mayor of Hilversum

Pieter Izak Broertjes (born 20 September 1952) is a Dutch journalist and politician of the Labour Party (PvdA). He serves as the Mayor of Hilversum since 1 July 2011.

Political offices
Preceded by Ernst Bakker	Mayor of Hilversum; 2011–present	Succeeded by Incumbent
