= Gerard Wallis de Vries =

Dutch politician (1936–2018)

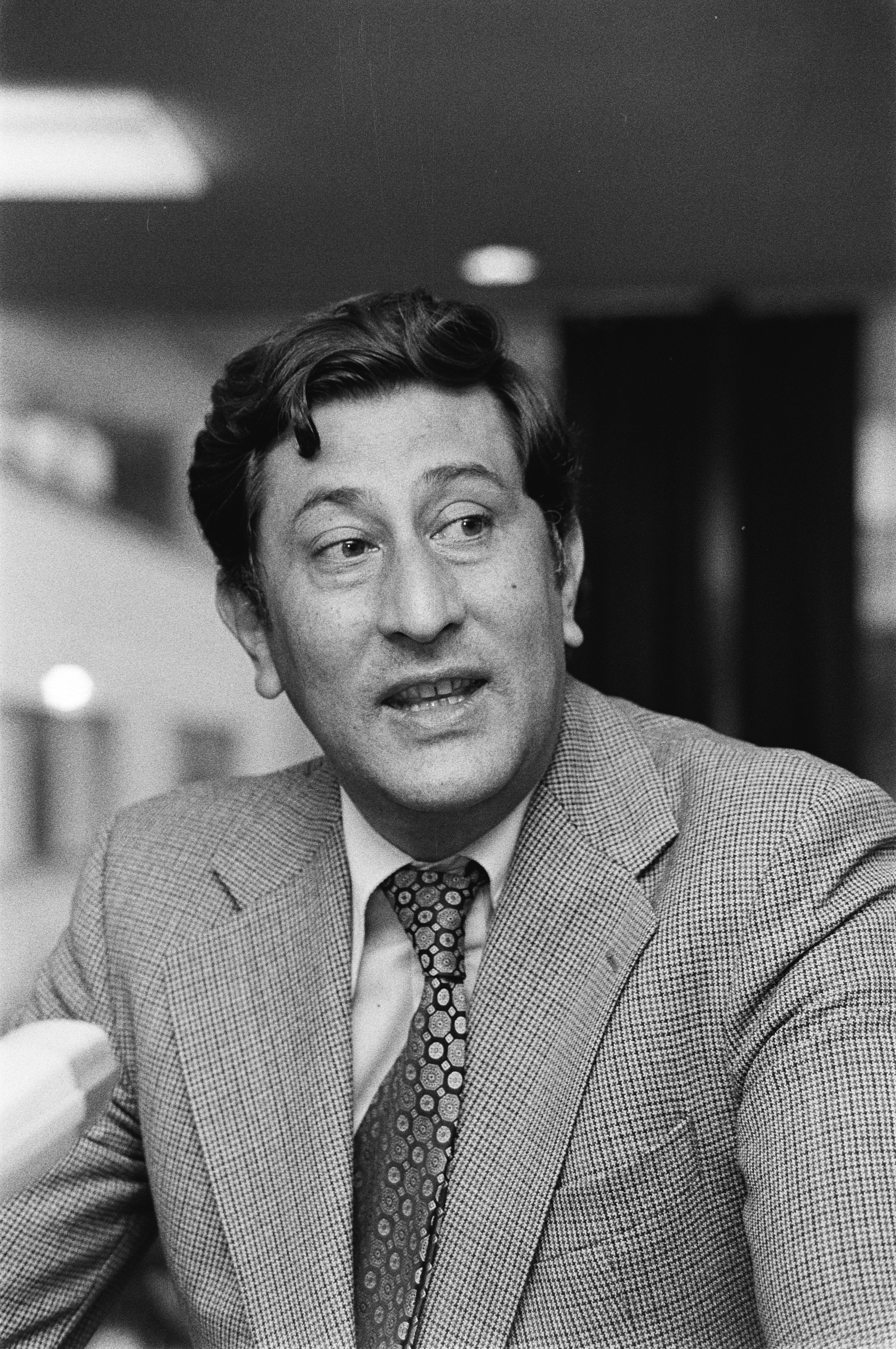
- Gerard Wallis de Vries in 1979

State Secretary for Culture, Recreation and Social Work
- In office 4 January 1978 – 11 September 1981 Serving with Jeltien Kraaijeveld-Wouters
- Prime Minister: Dries van Agt
- Preceded by: Wim Meijer
- Succeeded by: Hans de Boer

Personal details
- Born: Gerard Christiaan Wallis de Vries; 24 October 1936 Batavia, Dutch East Indies
- Died: 8 February 2018 (aged 81) The Hague, Netherlands
- Party: People's Party for Freedom and Democracy
- Children: 2 sons
- Education: Erasmus University Rotterdam (Bachelor of Laws)
- Occupation: Politician · civil servant · Corporate director · Nonprofit director · Media administrator

Gerard Christiaan Wallis de Vries (24 October 1936 – 8 February 2018) was a Dutch politician of the People's Party for Freedom and Democracy (VVD) and corporate director.

== Decorations ==
Honours
Ribbon bar	Honour	Country	Date	Comment
	Knight of the Order of the Netherlands Lion	Netherlands	26 October 1981	

Political offices
Preceded by Wim Meijer	State Secretary for Culture, Recreation and Social Work; 1978–1981; Served alongside: Jeltien Kraaijeveld-Wouters	Succeeded by Hans de Boer
Media offices
Unknown	Chairman of the General Association of Radio Broadcasting; 1982–1997	Succeeded by Tom Kok
