= Ottersum =

- Village
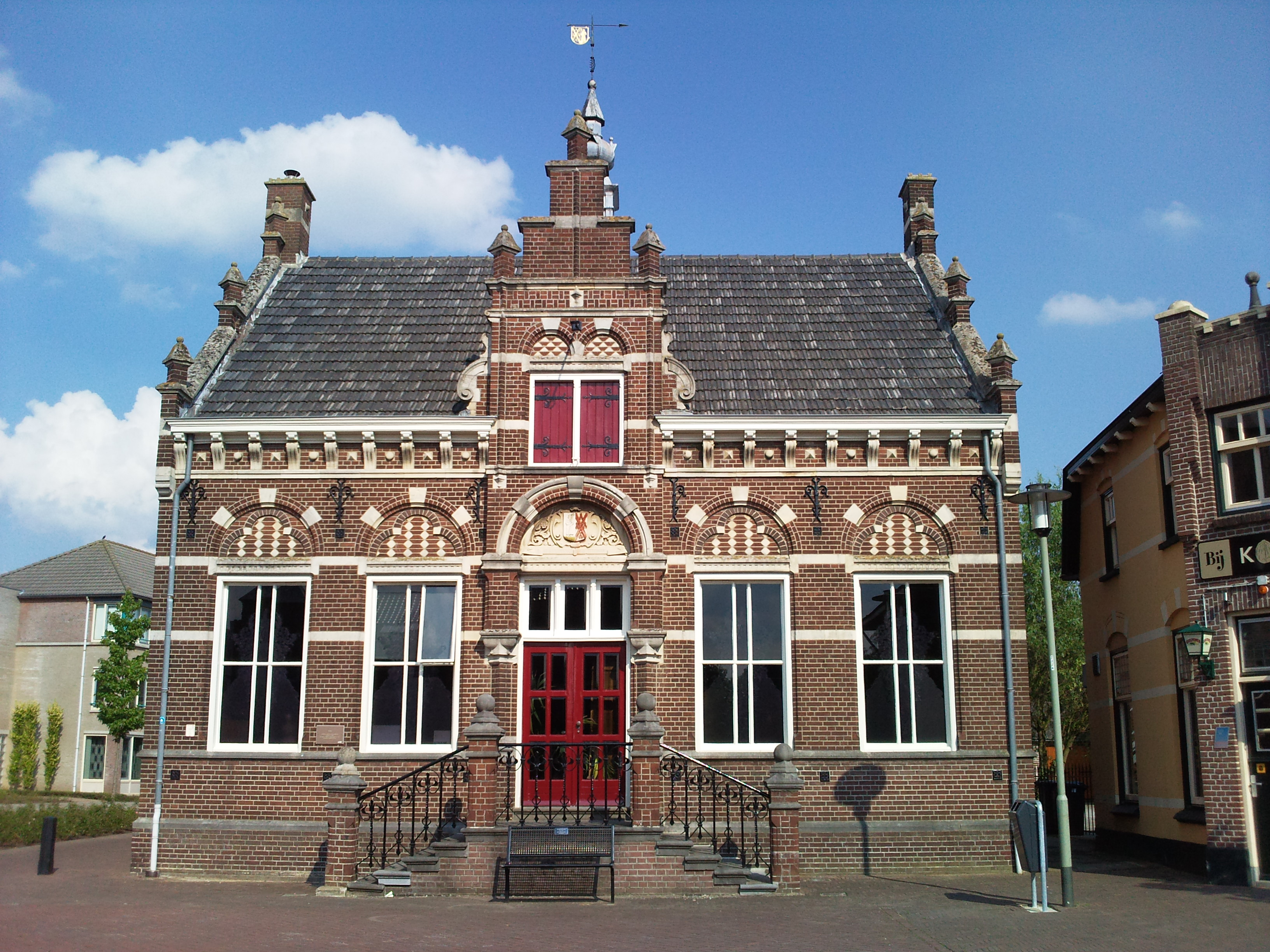
- Ottersum, former town hall

- Flag Coat of arms

- Location in the Netherlands Location in the province of Limburg in the Netherlands
- Coordinates: 51°42′14″N 5°59′3″E
- Country: Netherlands
- Province: Limburg
- Municipality: Gennep

Area
  - Total: 0.54 km^{2} (0.21 sq mi)
- Elevation: 13 m (43 ft)

Population (2021)
  - Total: 1,520
  - Density: 2,800/km^{2} (7,300/sq mi)
- Time zone: UTC+1 (CET)
  - Summer (DST): UTC+2 (CEST)
- Postal code: 6595
- Dialing code: 0485

Ottersum is a village in the Dutch province of Limburg. It is a part of the municipality of Gennep, and lies about 17 km southeast of Nijmegen.

== History ==
The village was first mentioned in 1349-1362 as Oitershem and means "house of Oter (person)". Ottersum developed along the Niers in the Early Middle Ages. It used to be part of the Duchy of Cleves and in 1815 became part of the Kingdom of the Netherlands.

The Catholic John the Baptist Church is a three-aisled basilica-like church which was built between 1930 and 1931. The former monastery Maria Roepaan was built by the Sisters of Divine Providence from Münster during the Kulturkampf. A school and orphanage were added to complex. The building was damaged in 1945, and restored in 1949. Since 1995, it used for corporate events.

Ottersum was home to 200 people in 1840. In 1944 and 1945, the village was damaged by war. It was a separate municipality until 1973, when it was merged with Gennep.

== Gallery ==
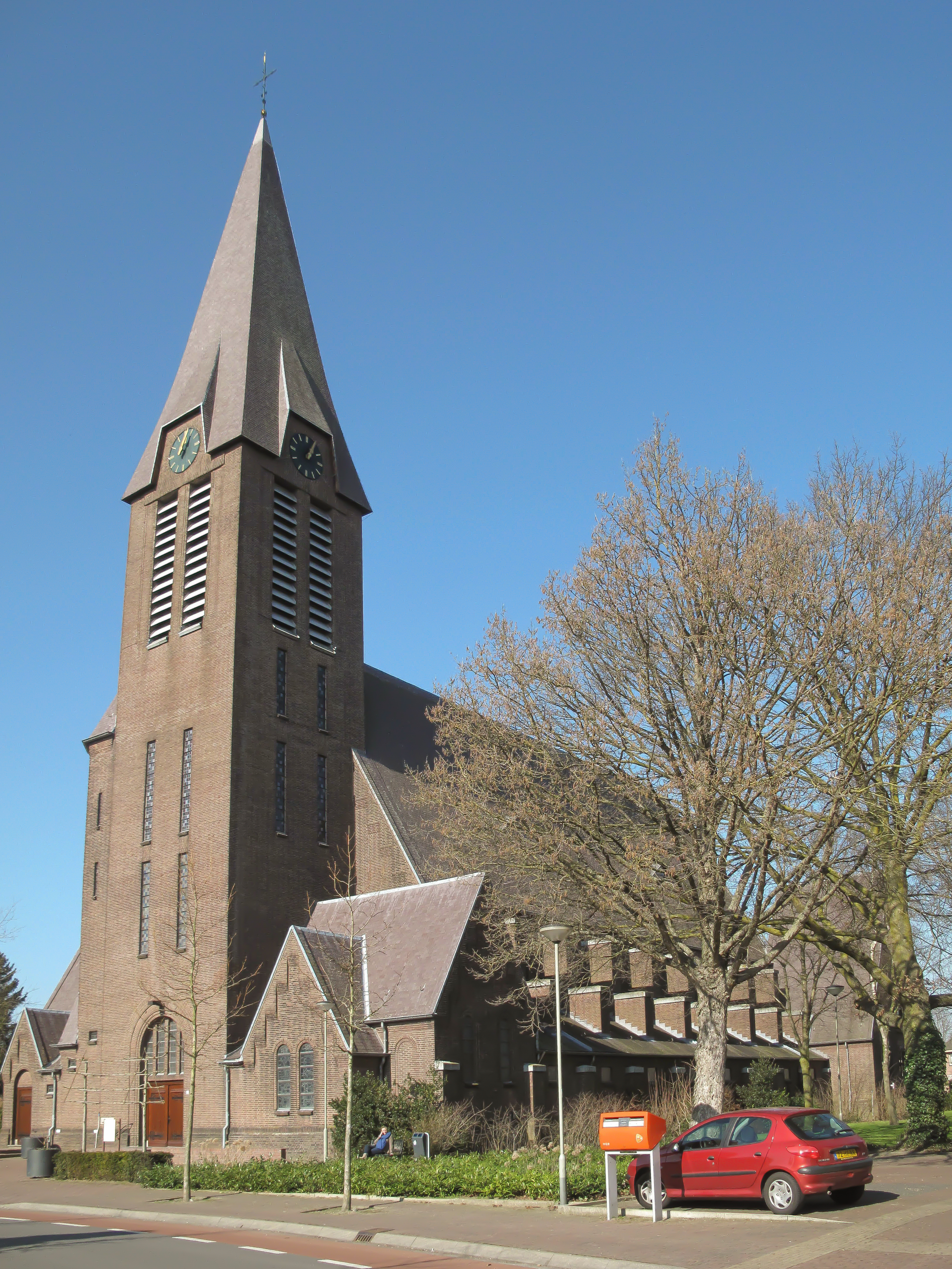
Ottersum, church: de Johannes de Doperkerk

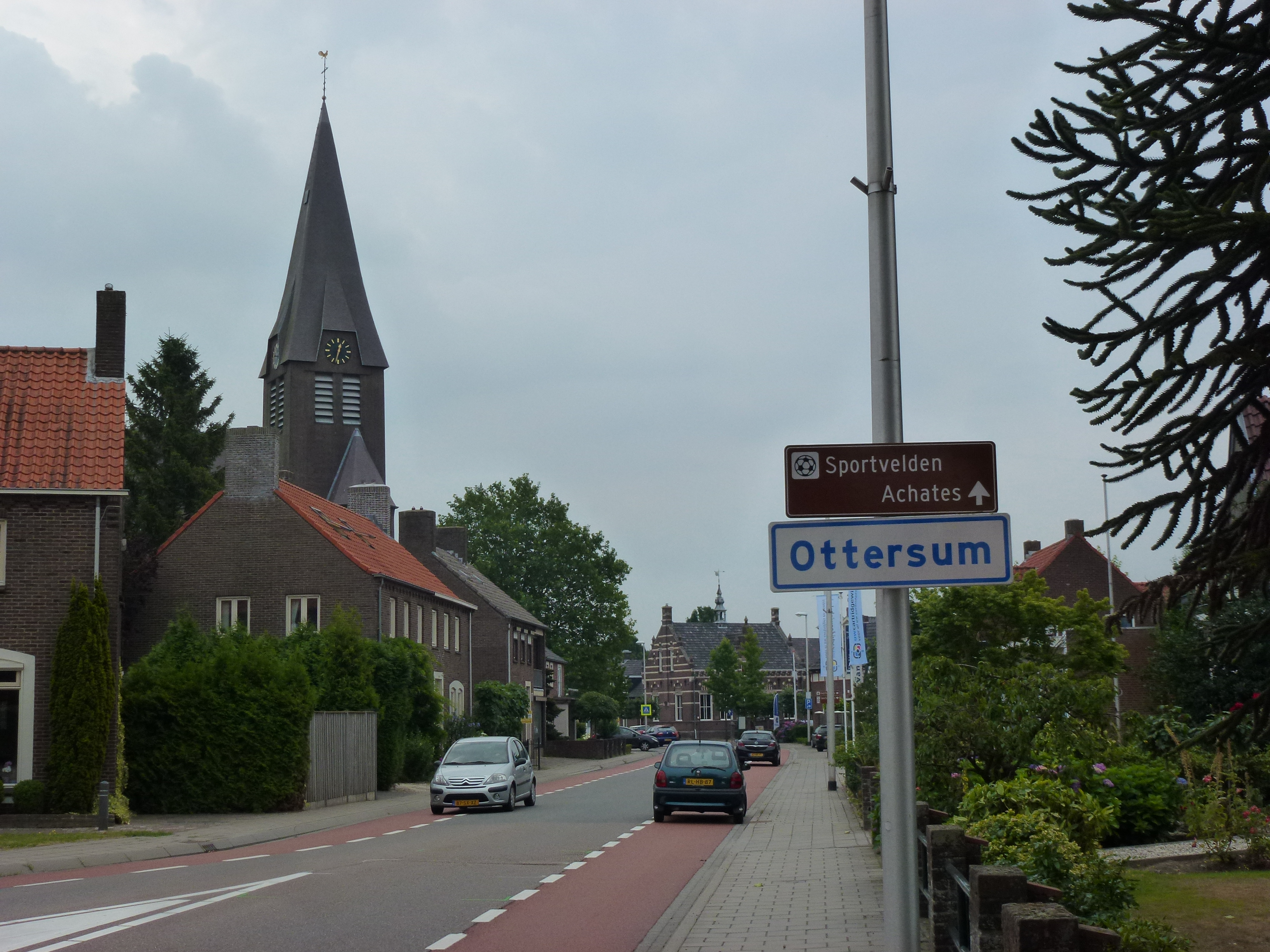
Street view

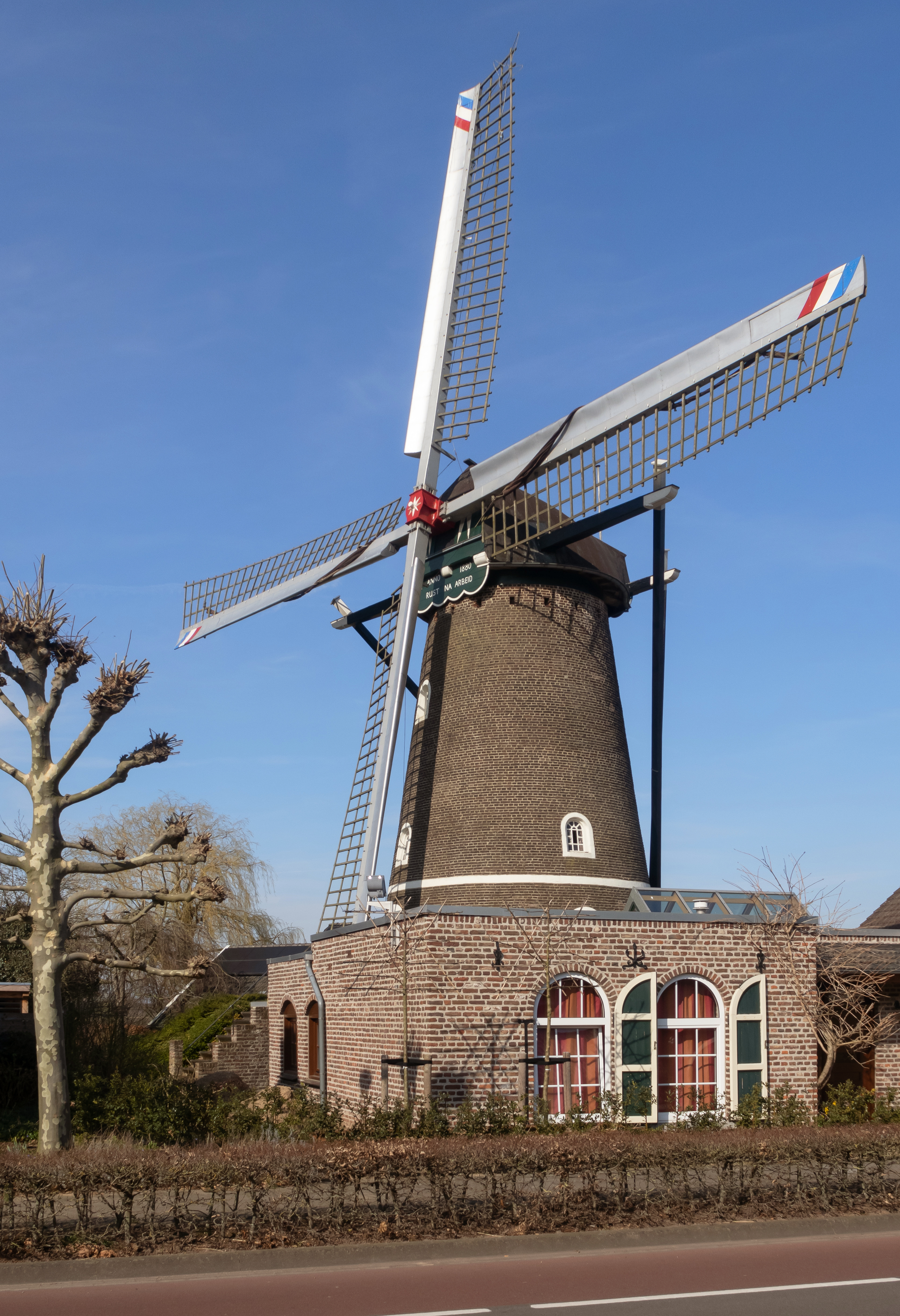
Wind mill Rust na Arbeid
