= Mauk de Brauw =

Dutch politician (1925–1984)

His Excellency Jonkheer Mauk de Brauw
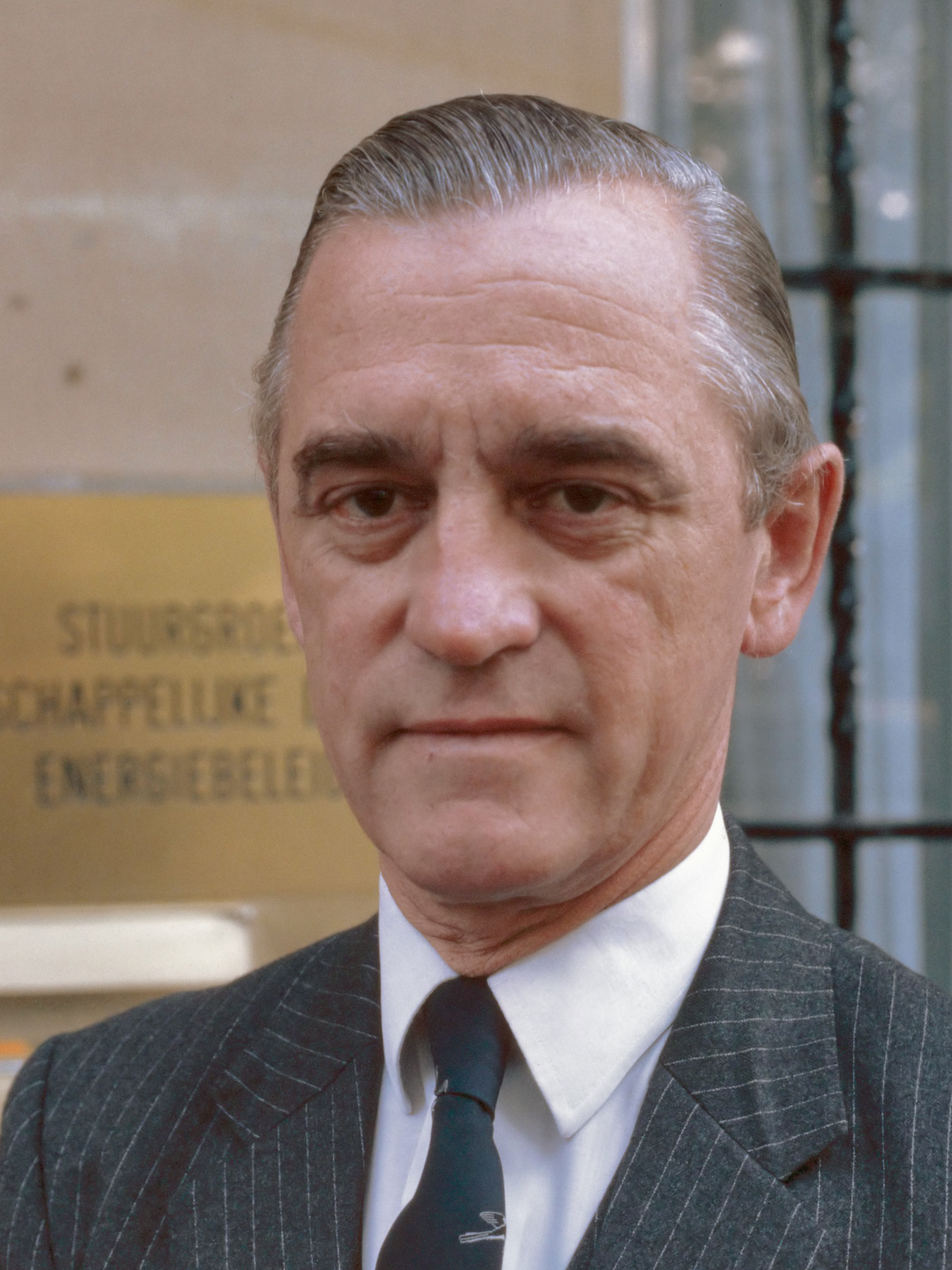
- Mauk de Brauw in 1981

Chairman of the Democratic Socialists '70
- In office 30 January 1973 – 10 March 1975
- Leader: Willem Drees Jr.
- Preceded by: Fred Polak
- Succeeded by: Henk Staneke

Member of the House of Representatives
- In office 7 December 1972 – 1 April 1975
- Parliamentary group: Independent (1975); Democratic; Socialists '70 (1972–1975)

Minister for Higher Education and Science Policy
- In office 6 July 1971 – 21 July 1972
- Prime Minister: Barend Biesheuvel
- Preceded by: Office established
- Succeeded by: Chris van Veen

Personal details
- Born: Maurits Louis de Brauw; 14 September 1925 The Hague, Netherlands
- Died: 12 November 1984 (aged 59) Leiden, Netherlands
- Party: Democrats 66 (from 1980)
- Other political affiliations: Independent (1970–1980); Democratic; Socialists '70 (1971–1975); People's Party for Freedom and Democracy (1947–1971)
- Spouse: Anna Maria Röell (m. 1955; div. 1984)
- Children: 5
- Education: Leiden University (LLB, LLM)
- Occupation: Politician; businessman; corporate director; nonprofit director; soldier

Military service
- Allegiance: Netherlands
- Branch/service: Royal Netherlands Army
- Years of service: 1943–1945 (Active duty)
- Rank: Private
- Unit: Royal Motorized Infantry Brigade
- Battles/wars: World War II; Operation Market Garden

Jonkheer Maurits Louis "Mauk" de Brauw (14 September 1925 – 12 November 1984) was a Dutch politician of the Democratic Socialists '70 (DS'70).

== Decorations ==
Honours
Ribbon bar	Honour	Country	Date	Comment
	Knight of the Order of the Netherlands Lion	Netherlands	8 June 1973	

Party political offices
Preceded by Fred Polak	Chairman of the Democratic Socialists '70; 1973–1975	Succeeded by Henk Staneke
Political offices
Preceded by Office established	Minister for Higher; Education and Science Policy; 1971–1972	Succeeded by Chris van Veen
