= Wim van Norden =

Dutch journalist (1917–2015)

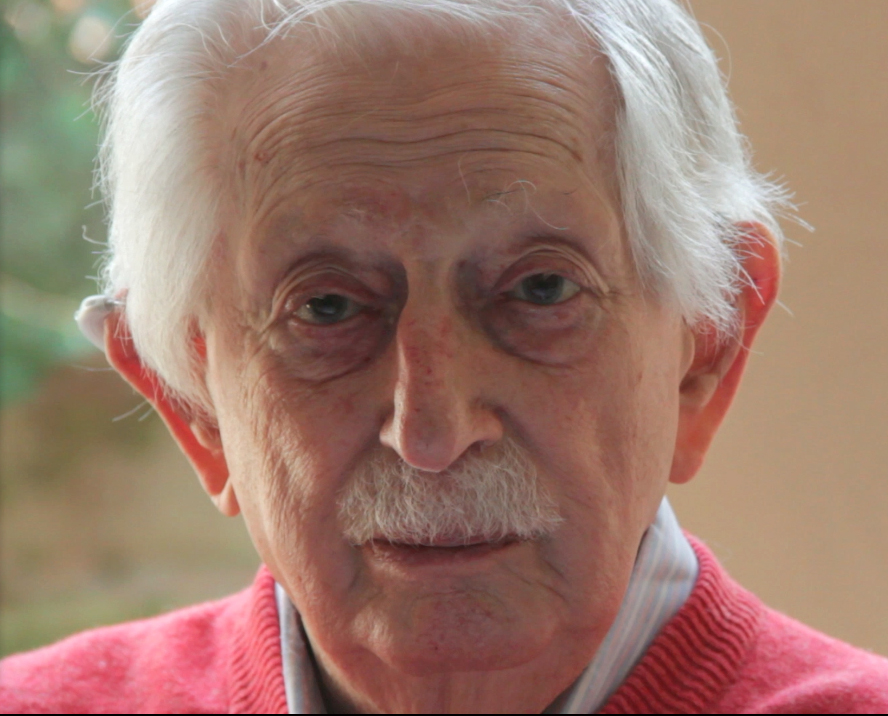
- Van Norden at the age of 95.
- Born: 13 June 1917; Bussum, Netherlands
- Died: 29 May 2015 (aged 97); Amsterdam, Netherlands
- Occupation: Journalist

Wim van Norden (13 June 1917 – 29 May 2015) was a Dutch journalist. He was one of the founders of the resistance paper Het Parool during World War II. He was jailed for six months by the Germans in 1942 but was later released due to lack of evidence for his involvement with Het Parool. Van Norden was active in the resistance for the remainder of the war. After the war he became director of the newspaper and although he originally planned to serve for only several months he kept his function until 1979. Van Norden was responsible for the founding of the publishing company Perscombinatie in which three newspapers worked together.

== Biography ==
=== Early life ===
Van Norden was born on 13 June 1917 in Bussum in an artistic, politically leftist family. His parents were teetotallers and vegetarians who were inclined to send all of their children to university. At home the family discussed politics, society, Adolf Hitler and the rise of fascism. Van Norden went to study economics at the Netherlands School of Commerce, precursor to the current Erasmus University in Rotterdam. Van Norden became member of a group of friends which included Max Nord, Simon Carmiggelt and his wife Tiny.

=== World War II ===
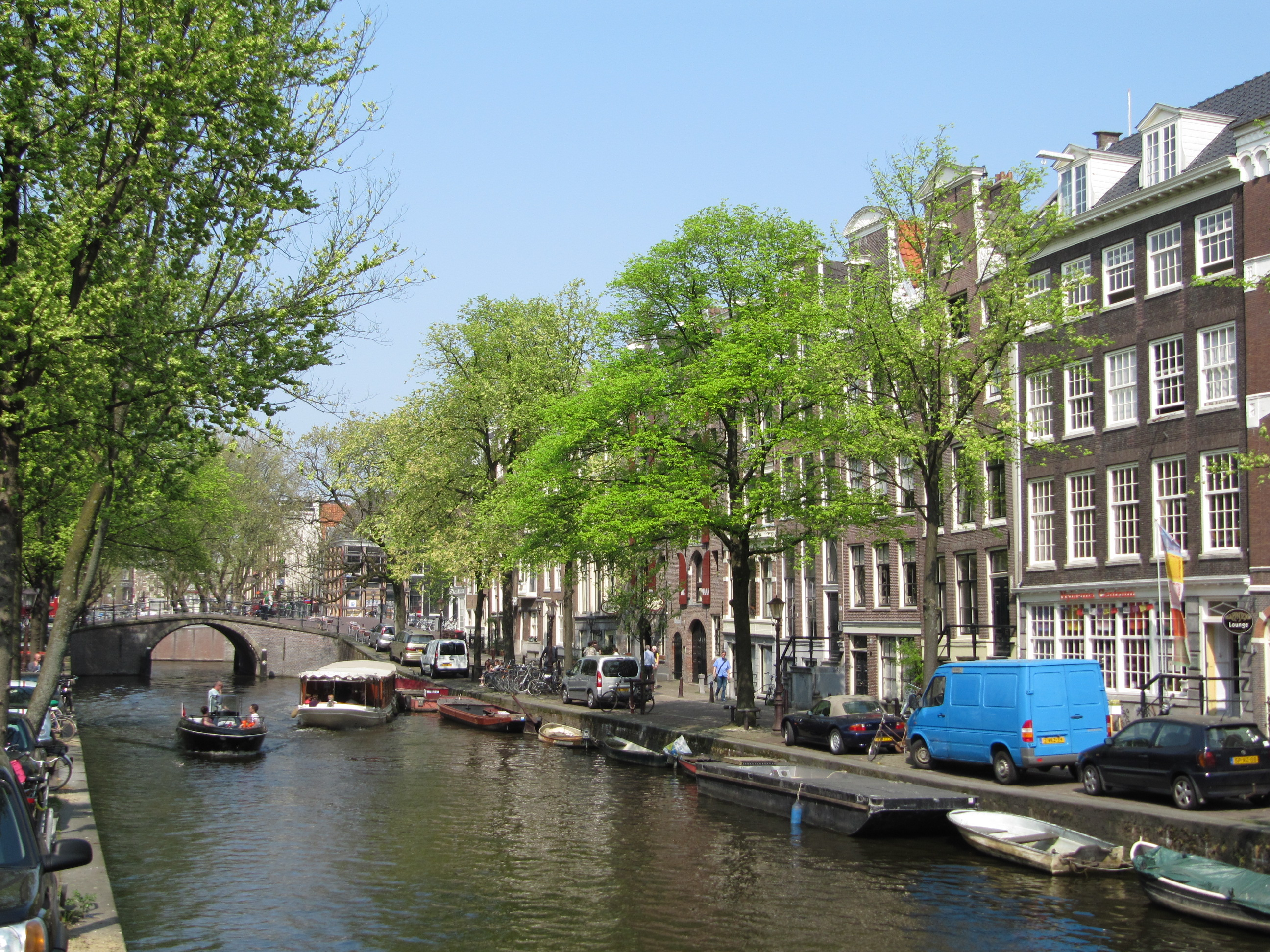
The Reguliersgracht in Amsterdam where Van Norden lived and worked during (and after) the War

When the Netherlands was occupied in World War II by Germany in May 1940 Van Norden and his group of friends decided on resisting the occupation forces. He, Nord, Carmiggelt and their families all lived in the Reguliersgracht in Amsterdam. In autumn 1940 he became involved in spreading the illegal Nieuwsbrief (English: Newsletter) of Pieter 't Hart, the war pseudonym of Frans Goedhart. In 1941 he became contributing editor to the newsletter after being invited by Goedhart. Van Norden also worked on the duplicator which produced the stencils on which the newsletter was made.

During the war the Nieuwsbrief became Het Parool. Even though Van Norden had several war pseudonyms and identity papers he was arrested with most of the editorial staff of the newspaper in late 1942. He was locked up for six months in the Oranjehotel jail in Scheveningen. The Germans could not prove his involvement with Het Parool and Van Norden was eventually released.

In the summer of 1944 Van Norden was looking for a jurist to help with the Foundation 1940–1944, which after the war would was to set up pensions for the relatives of dead resistance members. Johan van Lom was recommended to Van Norden and the latter introduced him to the resistance. Van Lom later betrayed the resistance, but was subsequently captured by them and ordered to drink poison. Van Lom refused and was shot dead. Van Norden was informed of Van Lom's death the next week while he was in hiding. In 2013 Van Norden still supported the resistance's decision.

On his involvement with the illegal newspaper Van Norden later said: "It was natural to help. It grows on you. I've never made a decision to join the resistance". The war made a deep impression on Van Norden, with fifty people contributing to Het Parool not surviving the hostilities.

=== Work at Het Parool after World War II ===
After the war ended the editorial staff of Het Parool decided to continue as a daily newspaper. The newspaper was founded with some savings from employees and a bank guarantee which was never used. In later years this would lead Van Norden to state: "We started Het Parool with 1,000 guilder, as long that isn't gone there are no problems". Van Norden at age 27 was asked by his associates to become the temporary director of the newspaper, as he had studied economics. He reluctantly agreed as he wanted to finish his studies in Rotterdam. Van Norden did not want to head a newspaper and intended on being in function for only several months.

Under Van Norden the decision was made to become an independent daily newspaper rather than a political party related newspaper. Shortly after the end of the war Koos Vorrink, a Social Democratic Workers' Party politician visited the editorial staff proposing to merge Het Parool and Het Vrije Volk into one socialist newspaper. Van Norden disagreed completely.

Van Norden traveled around the world and became convinced that small, independent, and the political and religiously based newspapers would disappear. He was convinced that economies of scale and pluriformity would allow for newspapers to survive. In 1968 Van Norden became one of the ground layers of the Perscombinatie, a publishing company consisting of Het Parool and De Volkskrant, later joined by Trouw. Van Norden imagined the publishing company as a way to maintain the independent newspapers. He served as director of the Perscombinatie and as chair of the Nederlandse Dagblad Pers for several years.

Relations between the newspapers of the Perscombinatie became troubled, even more after financial troubles hit the company. In 1979 he stepped back as direct of Het Parool and as chair of the Perscombinatie and became member of the board of commissioners of the Perscombinatie and secretary of the Parool Foundation. The Parool Foundation was the main shareholder of the Perscombinatie and the De Volkskrant was disgruntled with this. Van Norden solved the issue by having foundations of the three newspapers each appoint members to a management company that governed the Perscombinatie. In 1988 Van Norden stepped down as member of the board of commissioners. Van Norden stayed involved in journalism with editorial staff of Het Parool asking him for advice.

Van Norden voluntarily declined any profits the newspaper made.

=== Personal life ===
After World War II Van Norden lived his whole life in the Reguliersgracht Amsterdam, in the same house where he worked for Het Parool during the war. He was married and has a son and daughter.

Van Norden died on 29 May 2015, aged 97. At the time of his death he was the last remaining founding member of Het Parool.

Van Norden has received media coverage. In 1997 journalist Gerard Mulder wrote the book Wim van Norden, portret van een courantier, an unauthorised biography commemorating Van Norden's 80th birthday. Van Norden was also featured in two television shows, first in the biographical program Profiel in 2008. He also featured in the television show Na de Bevrijding in 2014.
