= Jan van Stuijvenberg =

Dutch politician (born 1928)

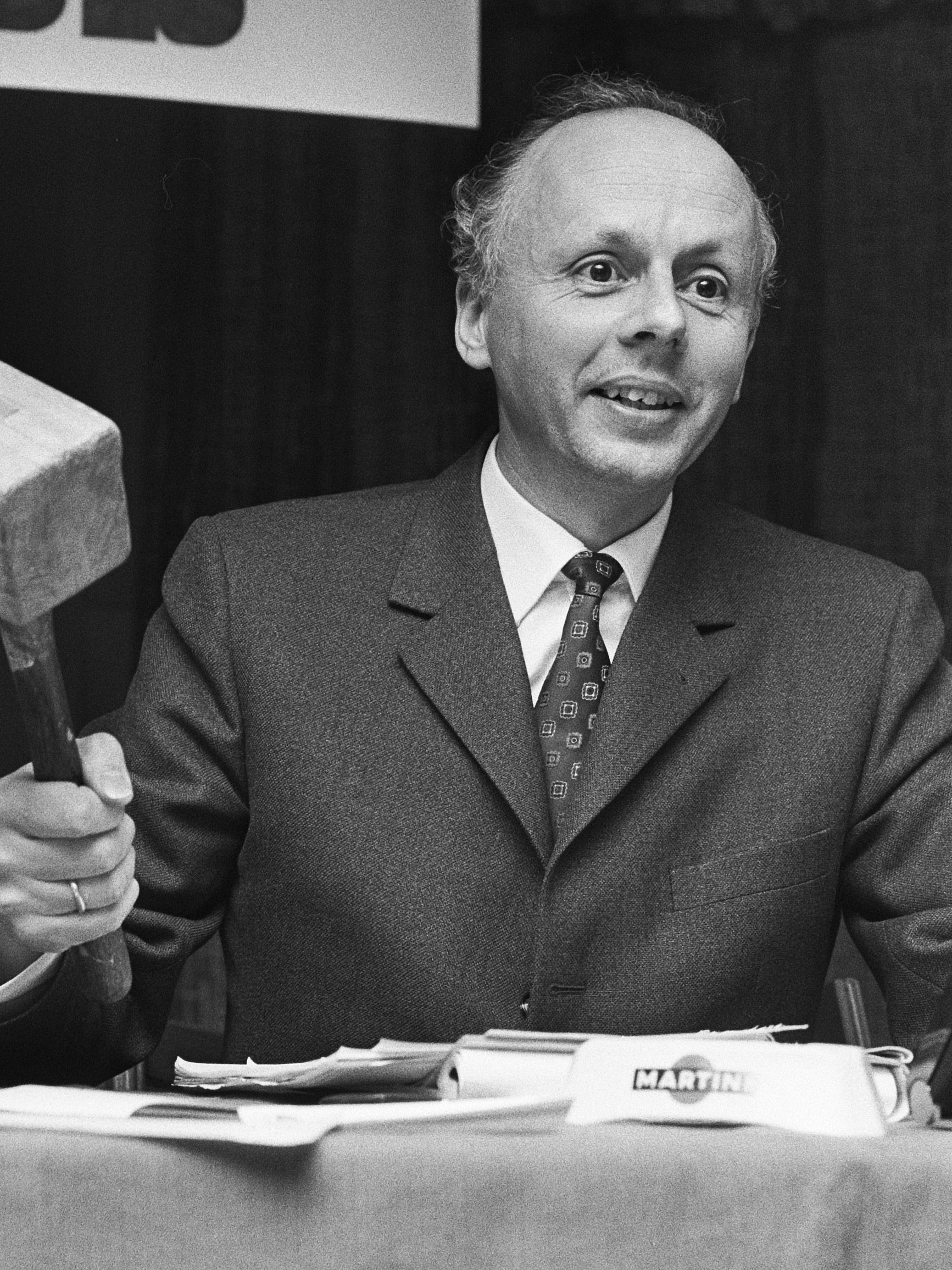
- Van Stuijvenberg in 1970

State Secretary for the Interior
- In office 28 July 1971 – 21 July 1972
- Prime Minister: Barend Biesheuvel
- Preceded by: Chris van Veen
- Succeeded by: Wim Polak (1973)

Chair of the Democratic Socialists '70
- In office 4 April 1970 – 30 October 1971
- Leader: Willem Drees Jr. (1971)
- Preceded by: Office established
- Succeeded by: Fred Polak

Personal details
- Born: Adrianus van Stuijvenberg; 28 January 1928 (age 98) Zaltbommel, Netherlands
- Party: Democratic Socialists '70 (from 1970)
- Other political affiliations: Independent (1970); Labour Party (until 1970)
- Education: Eindhoven University (Bachelor of Economics, Master of Economics)
- Occupation: Politician; Economist; Businessman; Corporate director; Nonprofit director; Hospital administrator; Management consultant

Adrianus "Jan" van Stuijvenberg (born 28 January 1928) is Dutch retired politician and co-founder of the Democratic Socialists '70 (DS'70) party. He served as State Secretary for the Interior from 28 July 1971 until 21 July 1972 in the Cabinet Biesheuvel I.

Party political offices
Preceded by Office established	Chair of the Democratic Socialists '70; 1970–1971	Succeeded by Fred Polak
Political offices
Preceded by Chris van Veen	State Secretary for the Interior; 1971–1972	Succeeded by Wim Polak (1973)
