= Max Nord =

Dutch journalist, writer, and translator

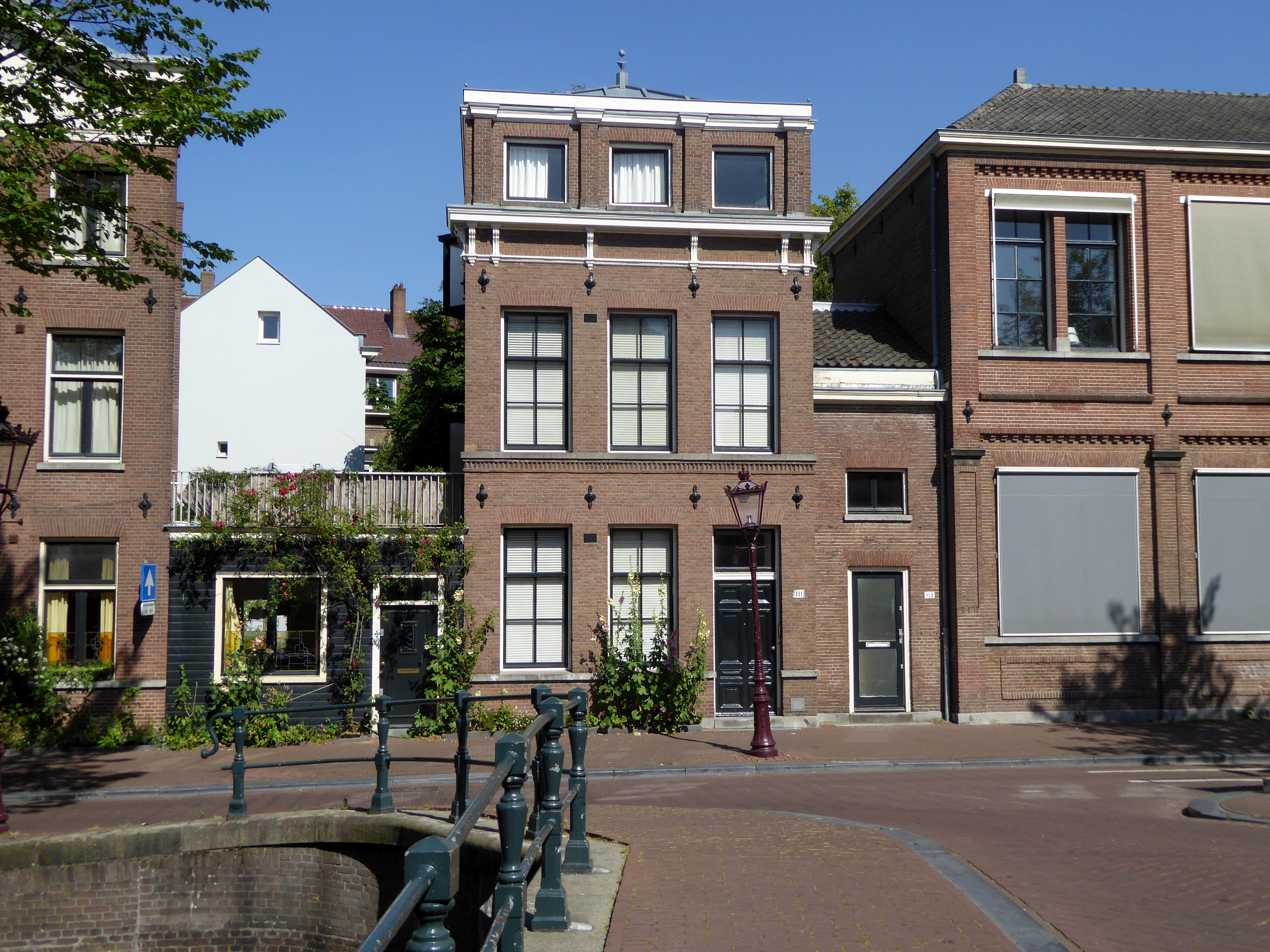
Reguliersgracht 111

Jacob Julius Max Nord (1 April 1916 – 28 February 2008) was a Dutch journalist, writer, and translator. He was one of the main editors of Het Parool, an illegal Dutch newspaper founded during World War II.

== Biography ==
=== Before and during the war ===
Nord studied political sciences in Paris, and from 1938 on worked as a reporter for the Dutch daily Het Vaderland. He had wanted to become a poet, but found himself, as he later wrote in his autobiography Achterwaarts ("Backwards", 1998), more suitable for work "in the background". With Menno ter Braak he translated Hermann Rauschning's Gespräche mit Hitler, which led to a charge of "insulting a friendly head of state", but before any trial could take place the Netherlands were already occupied by the Germans. During the occupation, Nord was one of the editors of the illegal newspaper Het Parool, working and becoming close friends with Wim van Norden and Simon Carmiggelt; the men and their families lived together in Amsterdam at Reguliersgracht 111, in the "nerve center" of Het Parool, never discovered by the Nazis. Nord noted later that the Sicherheitsdienst (the intelligence agency of the SS and the Nazi Party) was housed next door, and found that safe enough.

=== After the war ===
After the end of World War II he edited the paper's art section. When chief editor Gerrit Jan van Heuven Goedhart left, in 1950, he acted as the paper's temporary chief editor, not deeming himself good enough to become the permanent chief editor. He then became a correspondent in Paris. In 1987 he attended the two-month trial in Lyon at which war criminal Klaus Barbie was sentenced, and wrote about it in a series of articles for Vrij Nederland and a book, Klaus Barbie: een van ons (1989).

He wrote extensively on the Netherlands during World War II, including an illustrated book on Amsterdam during the Dutch famine of 1944 (the Hongerwinter), and edited a catalog called Thank You, Canada for Expo 67 in Montreal, Quebec. He was instrumental in bringing the 1955 photography exhibition The Family of Man to the Netherlands.

Nord also wrote books on Albert Helman, Luigi Pirandello, and Josepha Mendels, and a great number of essays, and translated work by André Gide, Luigi Pirandello, Cesare Pavese, and others.

Max Nord was president of the Dutch voorzitter van de Vereniging van Schrijvers en Vertalers, the Dutch association of writers and translators. He died at age 91. His obituary in NRC Handelsblad noted that he was "a modest and thoughtful man, who gladly shared his immense knowledge of journalism and literature. With increasing frequency he became the last one who had experienced it all himself and had known the big names from history".

== Selected bibliography ==
- Over Duitschland (1945, translation of Refléxions sur l'Allemagne by André Gide
- Amsterdam tijdens de hongerwinter (1947)
- Albert Helman; een inleiding tot zijn werk (1949)
- Alexander Cohen, een andersdenkende (1960)
- Luigi Pirandello (De Bezige Bij, 1962)
- De pijn om zo te leven en andere verhalen (1967; translation of short stories by Luigi Pirandello, with Jenny Tuin) ISBN 9021497190
- De aarde en de dood (1989; translation of La terra e la morte by Cesare Pavese) ISBN 9071855058 / ISBN 9071855066
- Klaus Barbie: een van ons. Kwadraat. 1989. ISBN 9789064810824.
- Josepha Mendels: portret van een kunstenaar (1991) ISBN 9011919556
- Verzen (1994; gedichten) ISBN 9069752662
- Het grote avontuur (1994; translation of Le Grand Meaulnes by Alain-Fournier) ISBN 9025301622
- Achterwaarts: memoires (1998; autobiography) ISBN 9029057475
