= Reguliersgracht =

Canal in Amsterdam

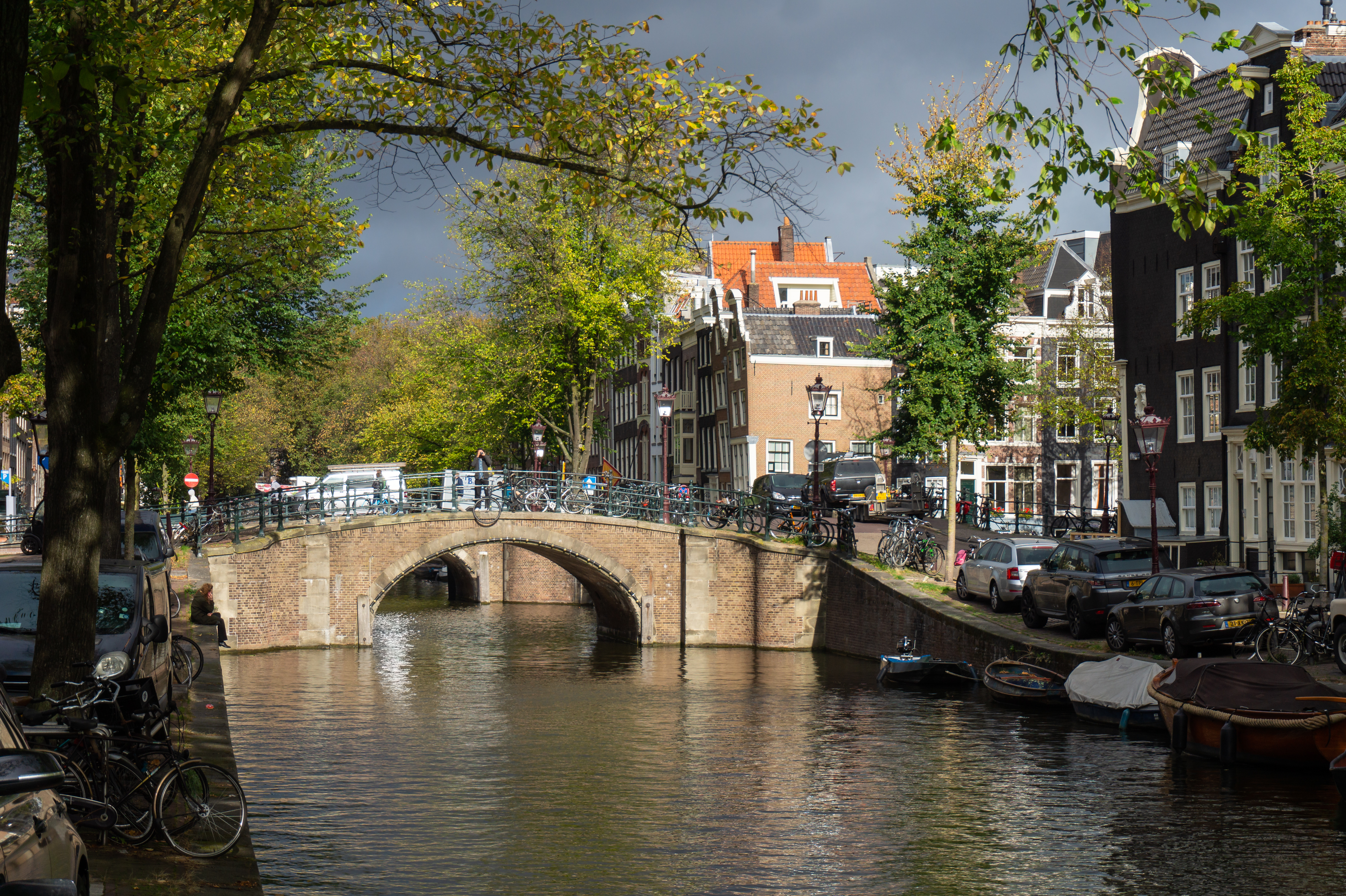
- Reguliersgracht crossing with Keizersgracht
- Length: 0.53 kilometres (0.33 mi)
- Location: Grachtengordel, Amsterdam
- Postal code: 1017
- Coordinates: 52.3639°N 4.8958°E
- From: Herengracht
- To: Lijnbaansgracht

Construction
- Inauguration: 1658

Reguliersgracht is a canal in Amsterdam, Netherlands. Established in 1658, it is located in the Grachtengordel, in the Centrum borough. During World War II the "nerve center" of the illegal paper Het Parool was housed there, in a house (number 111) occupied by Simon Carmiggelt, Max Nord, Wim van Norden and their families.

== Gallery ==
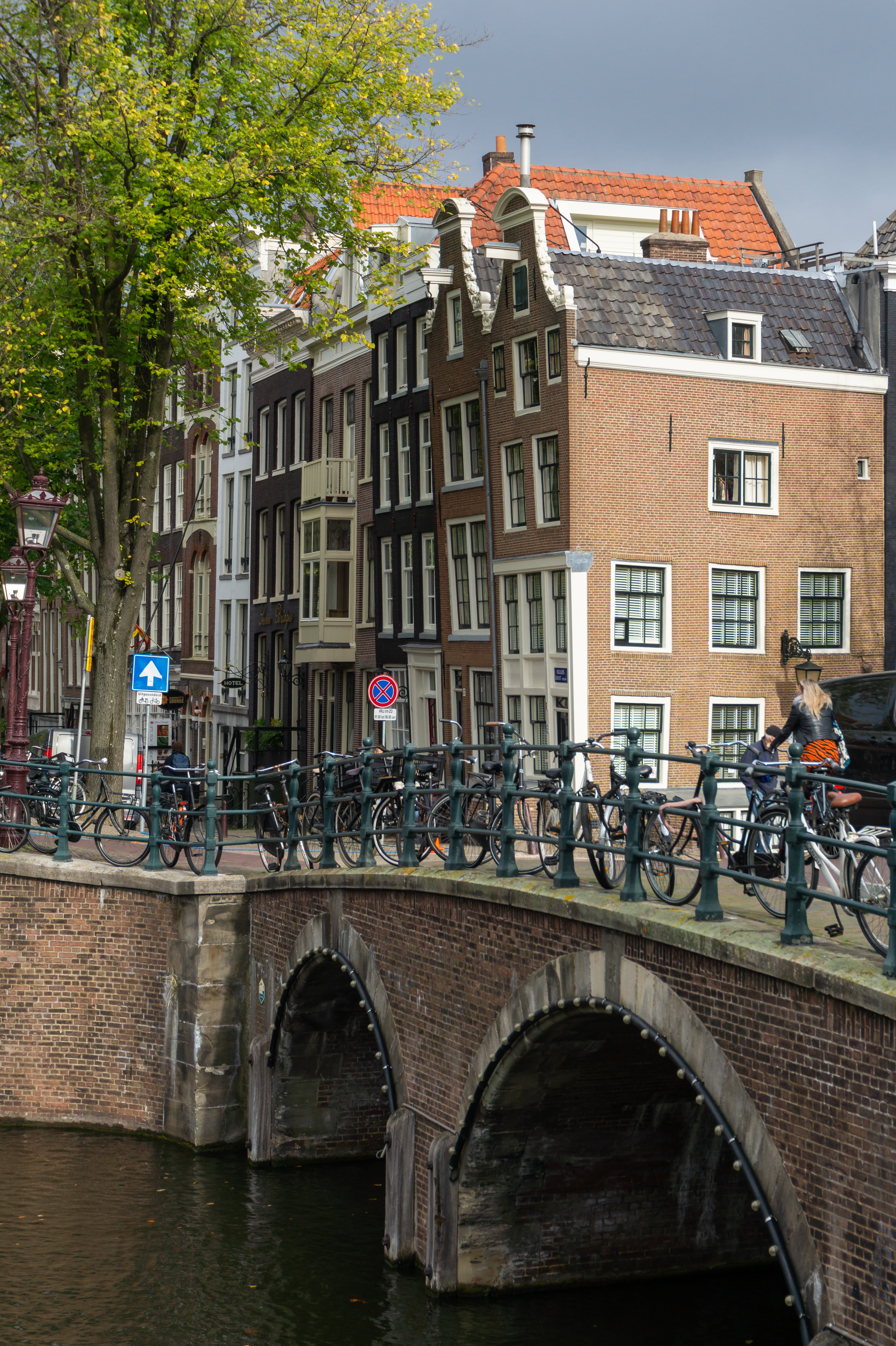
Houses on Reguliersgracht

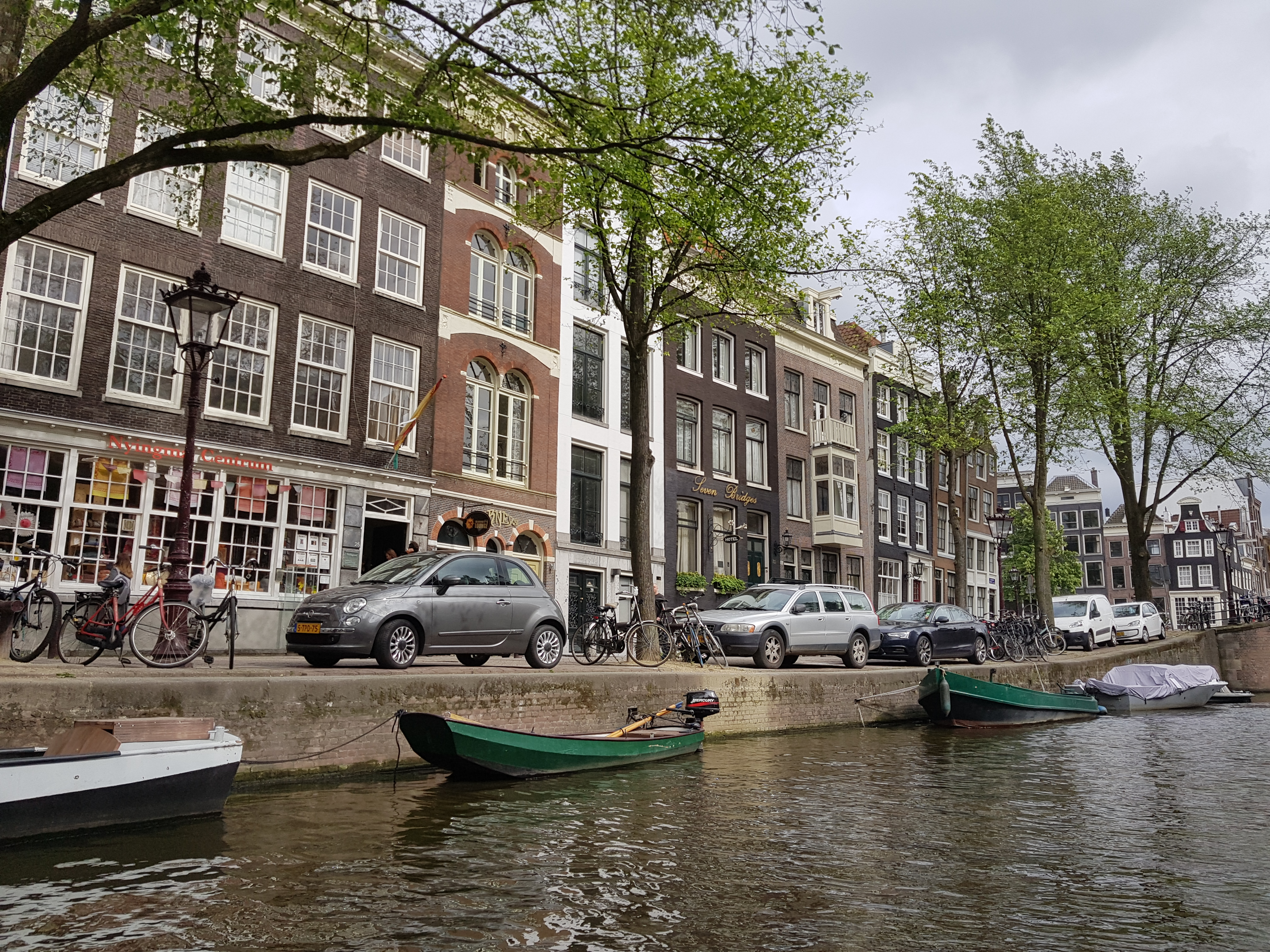
Reguliersgracht 31–33

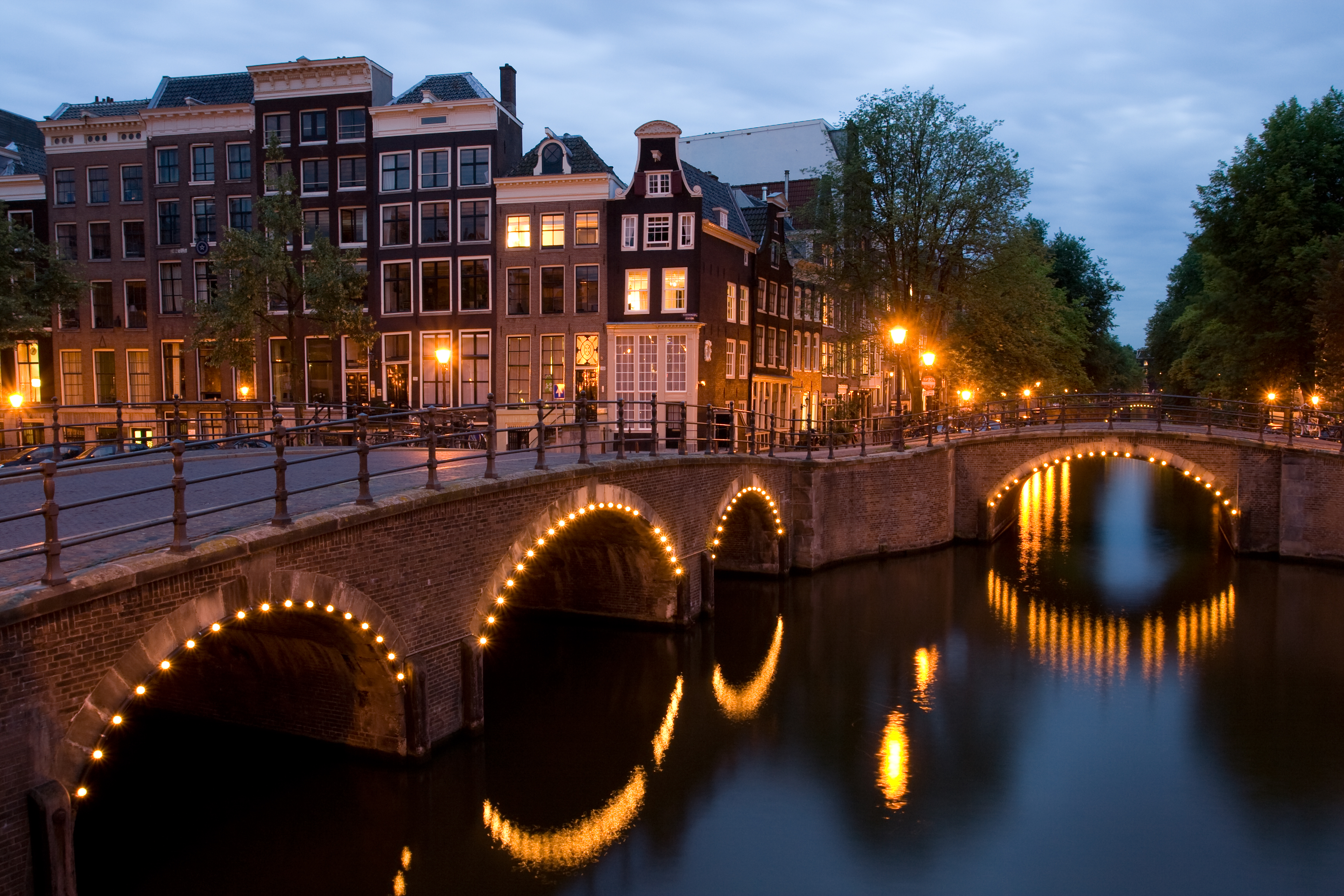
Crossing with Keizersgracht at dusk
