= Boy Trip =

Dutch politician

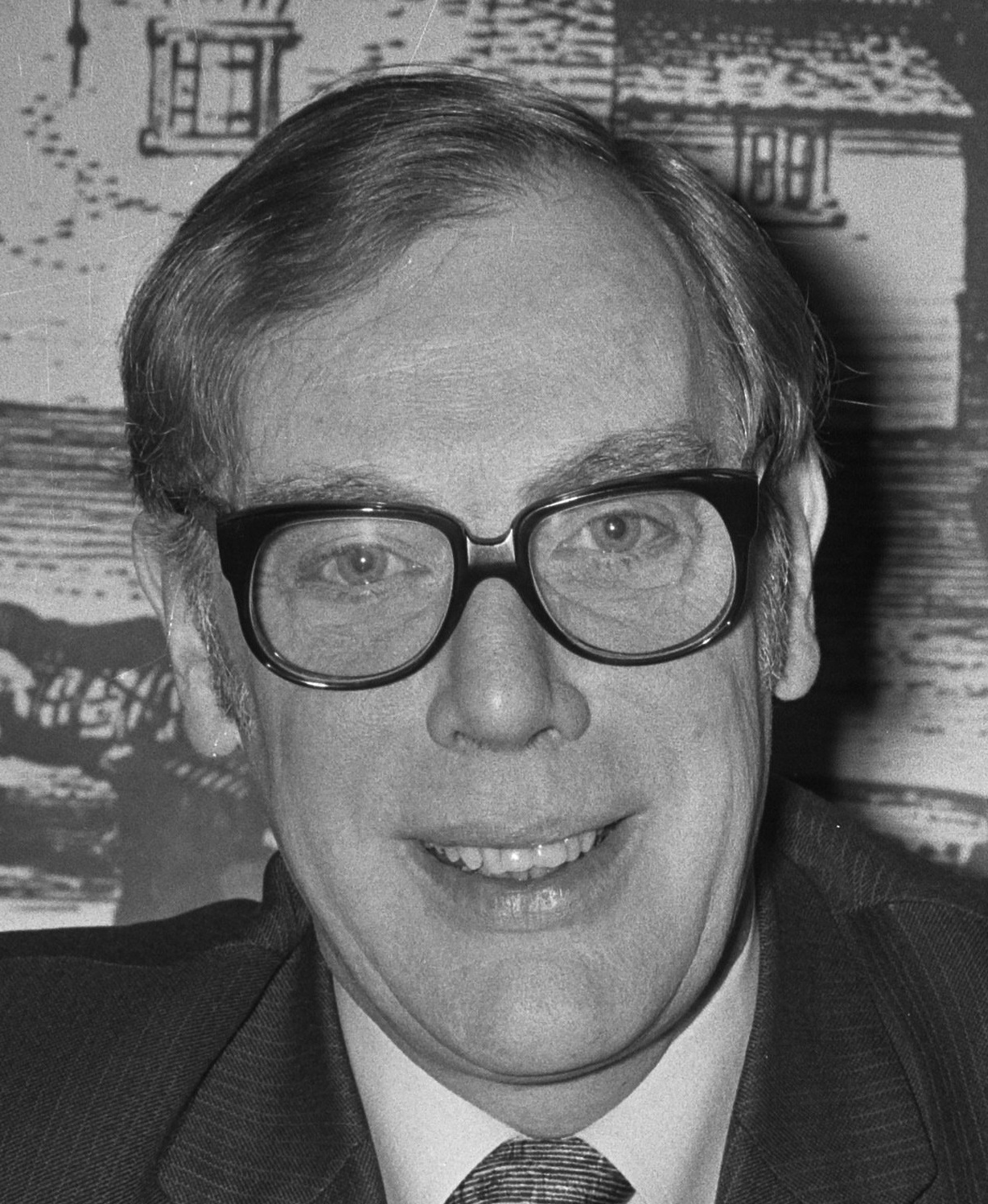
- Boy Trip in 1974

Member of the Senate
- In office 20 September 1977 – 10 June 1981
- Parliamentary group: Political Party of Radicals

Minister for Science Policy
- In office 11 May 1973 – 19 December 1977
- Prime Minister: Joop den Uyl
- Preceded by: Chris van Veen as Minister for Higher; Education and Science Policy
- Succeeded by: Rinus Peijnenburg

Personal details
- Born: Fokele Hendrik Pieter Trip; 21 October 1921 Amersfoort, Netherlands
- Died: 26 January 1990 (aged 68) Amsterdam, Netherlands
- Party: GreenLeft (from 1989)
- Other political affiliations: Political Party of Radicals (1968–1989); Catholic People's Party (until 1966)
- Spouse: Anna Sophia van Amerongen (m. 1953; died 1986)
- Children: 6 children
- Occupation: Politician · Businessman · Corporate director · Nonprofit director · Academic administrator · Hospital administrator

Fokele Hendrik Pieter "Boy" Trip (10 October 1921 – 26 January 1990) was a Dutch politician and businessman of the defunct Political Party of Radicals (PPR), which is now merged into GreenLeft (GL).

== Decorations ==
Honours
Ribbon bar	Honour	Country	Date	Comment
	Knight of the Order of the Netherlands Lion	Netherlands	30 April 1973	

Political offices
Preceded by Chris van Veen as Minister for Higher; Education and Science Policy	Minister for Science Policy; 1973–1977	Succeeded by Rinus Peijnenburg
Business positions
Unknown	Chairman of the Academic Medical Center; 1982–1990	Unknown
Academic offices
Unknown	President of the Utrecht University; 1972–1973	Unknown
