= Wim Polak =

Dutch politician (1924–1999)

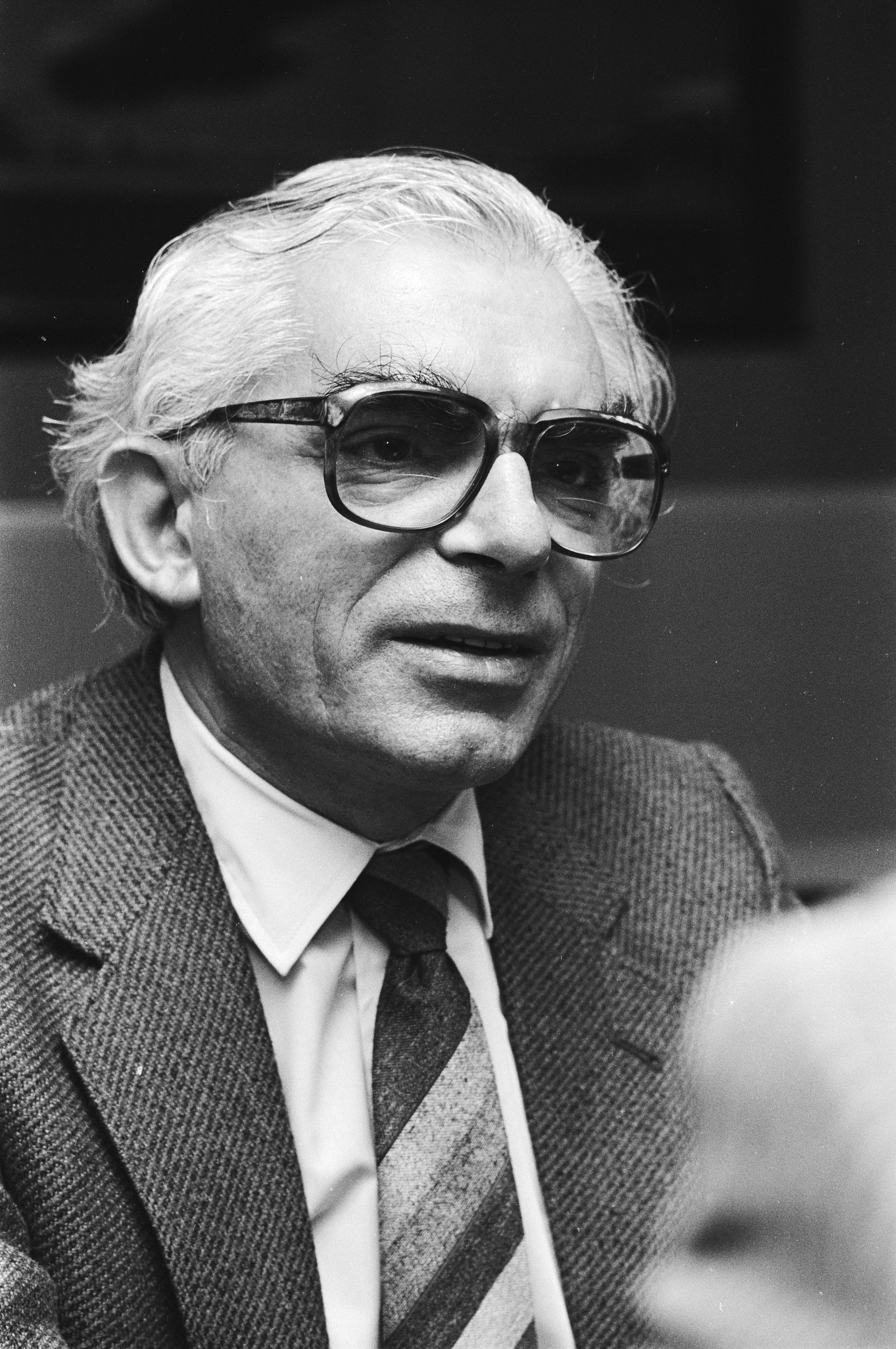
- Wim Polak in 1982

Member of the Council of State
- In office 16 April 1984 – 1 October 1994
- Vice President: Willem Scholten

Mayor of Amsterdam
- In office 15 June 1977 – 1 June 1983
- Preceded by: Louis Kuijpers (Ad interim)
- Succeeded by: Enneüs Heerma (Ad interim)

State Secretary for the Interior
- In office 11 May 1973 – 1 May 1977
- Prime Minister: Joop den Uyl
- Preceded by: Jan van Stuijvenberg
- Succeeded by: Henk Koning

Personal details
- Born: Willem Polak; 14 September 1924 Amsterdam, Netherlands
- Died: 1 October 1999 (aged 75) Ilpendam, Netherlands
- Cause of death: Cancer
- Party: Labour Party (from 1946)
- Other political affiliations: Social Democratic; Workers' Party (1945–1946)
- Spouse: Johanna van 't Kruijs (m. 1947)
- Children: 1 son and 1 daughter
- Education: University of Amsterdam (Bachelor of Economics)
- Occupation: Politician · Civil servant · Economist · Journalist · Editor · Author · Corporate director · Nonprofit director

Willem "Wim" Polak (14 September 1924 – 1 October 1999) was a Dutch politician of the Labour Party (PvdA) and economist.

== Biography ==
Polak was born to a Jewish merchant family in Amsterdam on 14 September 1924. His parents were murdered by the Nazis during the German Occupation of the Netherlands. After the Second World War, he worked as a journalist for Het Vrije Volk. Polak was appointed Secretary of State for local finances in Joop den Uyl's government. He worked towards improving the financial position of the larger Dutch cities. Subsequently, he became mayor of Amsterdam for a six-year period, where his challenges included numerous squatting cases as well as riots related to Queen Beatrix's coronation.

He died in 1999 at his home in Ilpendam.

== Decorations ==
Honours
Ribbon bar	Honour	Country	Date	Comment
	Knight of the Order of the Netherlands Lion	Netherlands	11 April 1978	
	Commander of the Order of Orange-Nassau	Netherlands	1 June 1983	

Political offices
Preceded by Jan van Stuijvenberg	State Secretary for the Interior; 1973–1977	Succeeded by Henk Koning
Preceded by Louis Kuijpers; Ad interim	Mayor of Amsterdam; 1977–1981	Succeeded by Enneüs Heerma; Ad interim
