= Het Parool =

Dutch daily newspaper

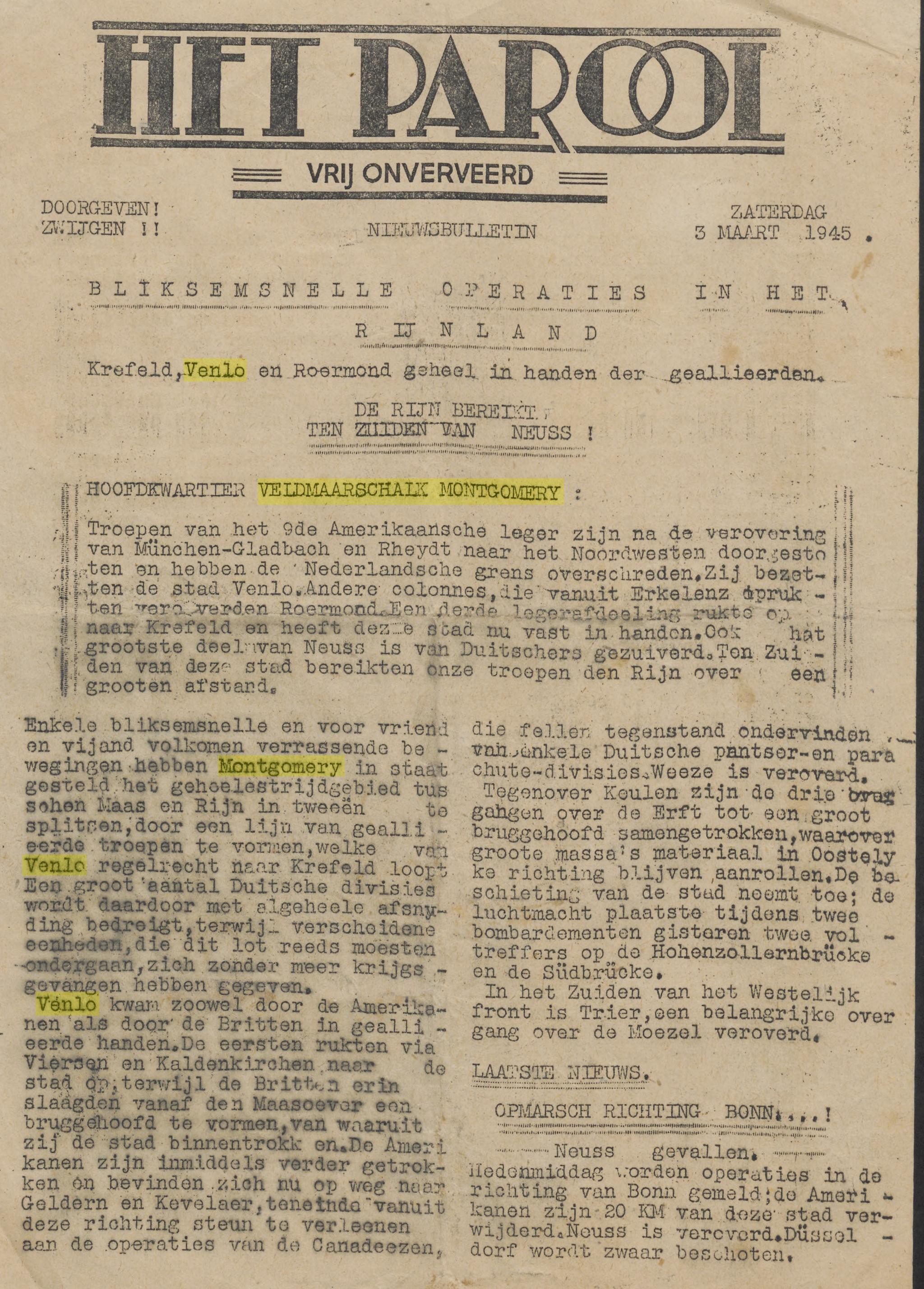
- Page from the edition of 3 March 1945
- Type: Daily newspaper
- Format: Tabloid
- Owners: De Persgroep; stichting Het Nieuwe Parool
- Publisher: DPG Media
- Editor-in-chief: Kamilla Leupen
- Staff writers: 73
- Founded: 1940
- Language: Dutch
- Headquarters: Jacob Bontiusplaats 9, Amsterdam, Netherlands
- Circulation: 64,000 subscription; 20,000 street sales
- Sister newspapers: Algemeen Dagblad
- ISSN: 1389-2975
- Website: parool.nl

Het Parool (Dutch pronunciation: [ɦɛt paːˈroːl]) is an Amsterdam-based daily newspaper. It was first published on 10 February 1941 as a resistance paper during the German occupation of the Netherlands (1940–1945). In English, its name means The Password or The Motto.

== History ==
=== Second World War ===
The paper was preceded by a stenciled newsletter which was started in May 1940 by Frans Goedhart. In late 1940, Wim van Norden joined the group of producers of the newsletter; Van Norden would later serve as director of the newspaper between 1945 and 1979. Jaap Nunes Vaz also became involved with the newspaper. In 1944, the paper, albeit illegal and vigorously persecuted, reached a circulation of approximately 100,000, and it was distributed by the Dutch resistance. Other important contributors were Simon Carmiggelt and Max Nord, who lived with Van Norden and their families on the Reguliersgracht, in the headquarters of the paper, which was never discovered by the German occupiers.

Numerous staff were apprehended and killed by the Germans and their Dutch collaborators. Alphons Meeuwis who distributed the paper was arrested in 1941 and sent to various camps. Nunes Vaz was arrested by the Gestapo on 25 October 1942 and sent to Sobibor concentration camp.

=== Postwar ===
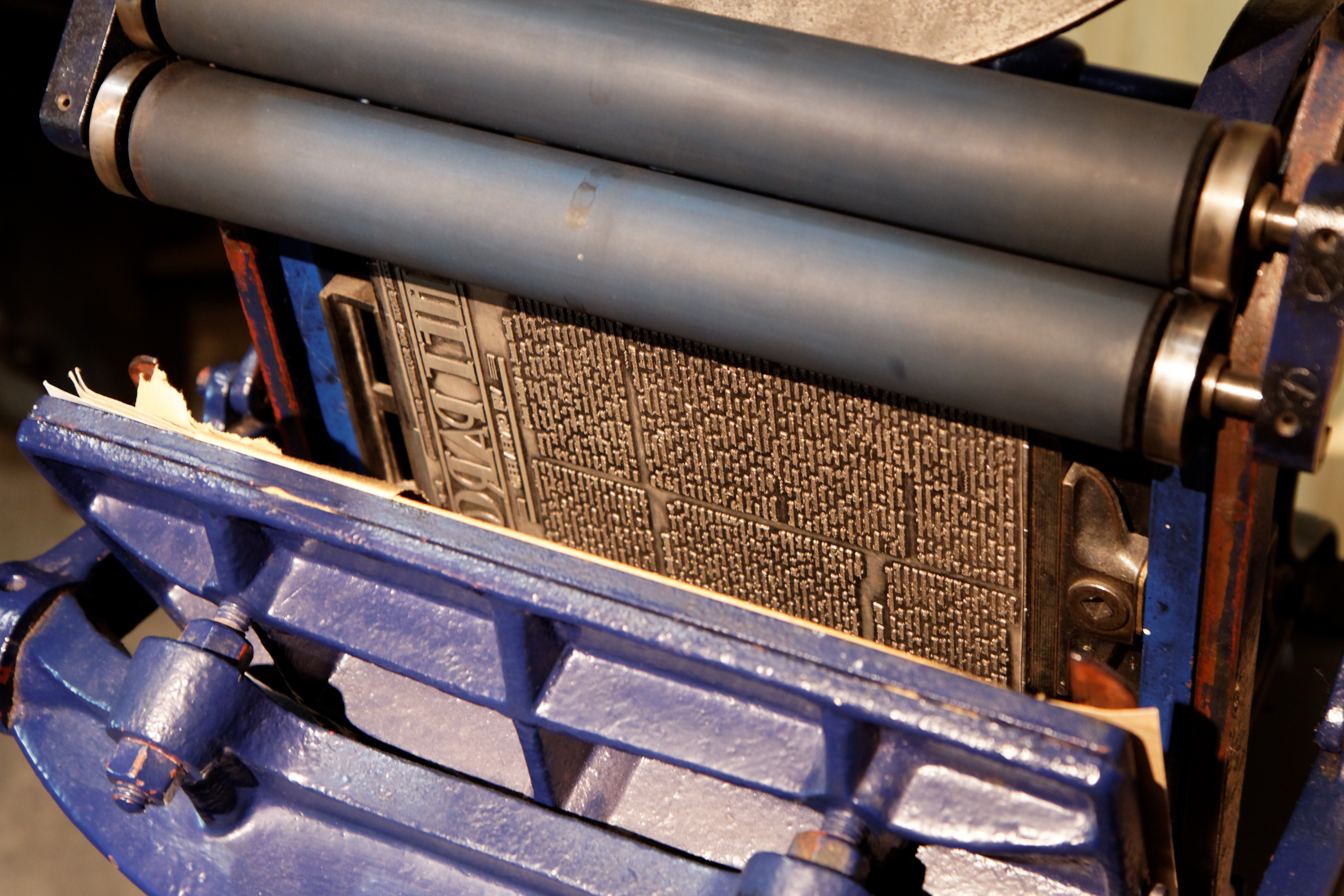
Printing press of Het Parool

After the war, Het Parool quickly became one of the largest newspapers in the Netherlands, partly because much of the population appreciated it for being the most prolific resistance paper and partly because newspapers that had collaborated with the German occupier were banned from publication.

Apart from its main publication, Het Parool published magazines and local newspapers in the Netherlands. A string of locally-based newspapers appeared alongside Het Parool, including Het Rotterdamsch Parool (1947–1971), Nieuw Utrechtsch Dagblad, Haagsch Dagblad, and Het Flevoparool (1982–1988). These local publications were all discontinued in the late sixties, early seventies, or (in the case of Het Flevoparool) eighties.

Readership reached its peak in the mid-1960s with a subscription of over 400,000, making it the second-biggest newspaper in the Netherlands at that time. In the latter part of the 1960s, the newspaper, under conservative editor in chief Herman Sandberg, vehemently supported the Vietnam War, which alienated a substantial part of Het Parool's majority liberal and left-wing readership. This started a steady decline in subscriptions and circulation, which persisted for almost four decades.

=== Perscombinatie and PCM ===
In 1968 Het Parool started the publishing company Perscombinatie (English: Press Combination) with competitor De Volkskrant, mainly to join investment in new printing presses. In 1973 Trouw, also a former resistance paper, joined the corporation.

At the start of Perscombinatie, Het Parool was the leading paper, but due to its declining circulation, De Volkskrant took over the prime role within the company starting in the early eighties, although the owner of the Het Parool, Stichting Het Parool (English: The Parool Foundation) remained the majority shareholder, with 57% of the shares of Perscombinatie. After Stichting Het Parool merged with book publisher Meulenhoff, the two formed Perscombinatie and Meulenhoff & Company (PCM).

=== Termination and restart ===
In the 1990s, Het Parool started turning a loss, due to stiff competition and a lack of investment by PCM. The paper tried several different programs to counter this (including a move toward being a local Amsterdam newspaper in 1997), but these showed few results. In 2002, PCM announced termination of the paper, citing substantial losses and declining readership.

But instead, majority shareholder Stichting Het Parool opted for a management bailout of the newspaper, in effect terminating its ownership of PCM in return for the rights to publish Het Parool. The bailout took effect on 1 January 2003. PCM was subsequently acquired by British-based investment group Apax Partners, which led to substantial debts and significant problems for the company.

=== De Persgroep and DPG Media ===
To strengthen this new ownership base, De Persgroep, the biggest newspaper publisher in Belgium, was asked to take a substantial minority share in the setup, alongside minority participation by both staff and readers. As a stand-alone newspaper, Het Parool remained national, yet with a focus on its Amsterdam home base.

In the new configuration, and after a collective layoff of 43 staff, Het Parool returned to profit within a year. On 30 March 2003 Het Parool became the first newspaper in the Netherlands to switch from broadsheet to tabloid format.

For Belgium-based De Persgroep, Het Parool served as a first foothold in the Netherlands, leading to the acquisition of a majority of the struggling PCM in 2009. In 2011, Het Parool was re-absorbed by PCM, which was renamed De Persgroep Nederland. Former Stichting Het Parool management began to run the company, closely re-establishing the Perscombinatie-situation of the 1970s.

In February 2012, Het Parool acquired Amsterdam-based commercial television station AT5 with public broadcaster AVRO and regional TV station RTV Noord-Holland to form a new multimedia corporation, which will also include online activities of both Parool and AT5, within De Persgroep.

== Organization and subscription ==
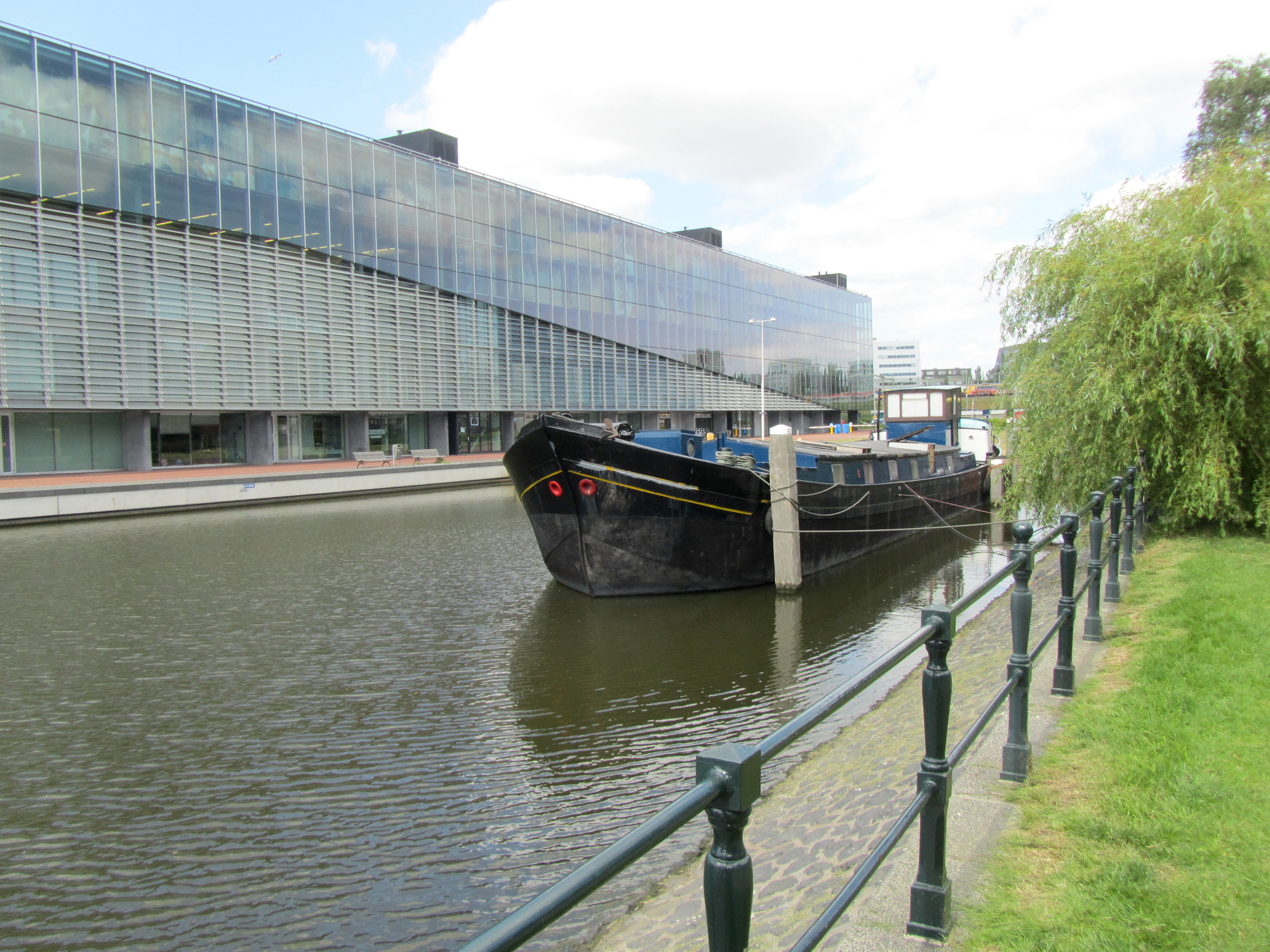
Office building of Het Parool

As of 2015 Het Parool had a staff of 73, who are based at the City desk, Arts and Media, Sports, Foreign, and Business desks. The paper consists of a news section and a daily, themed magazine called PS. On weekends, a glossy, PS van de Week, is published alongside the newspaper. The current editor in chief is Kamilla Leupen.

Its daily circulation, through subscription, was 64,403 in 2013.

== Layout ==
Het Parool was restyled twice by Mario Garcia: in 2004 (when it became a tabloid), and in 2008.

== See also ==
- Jip and Janneke
