= Chris van Veen =

Dutch politician (1922–2009)

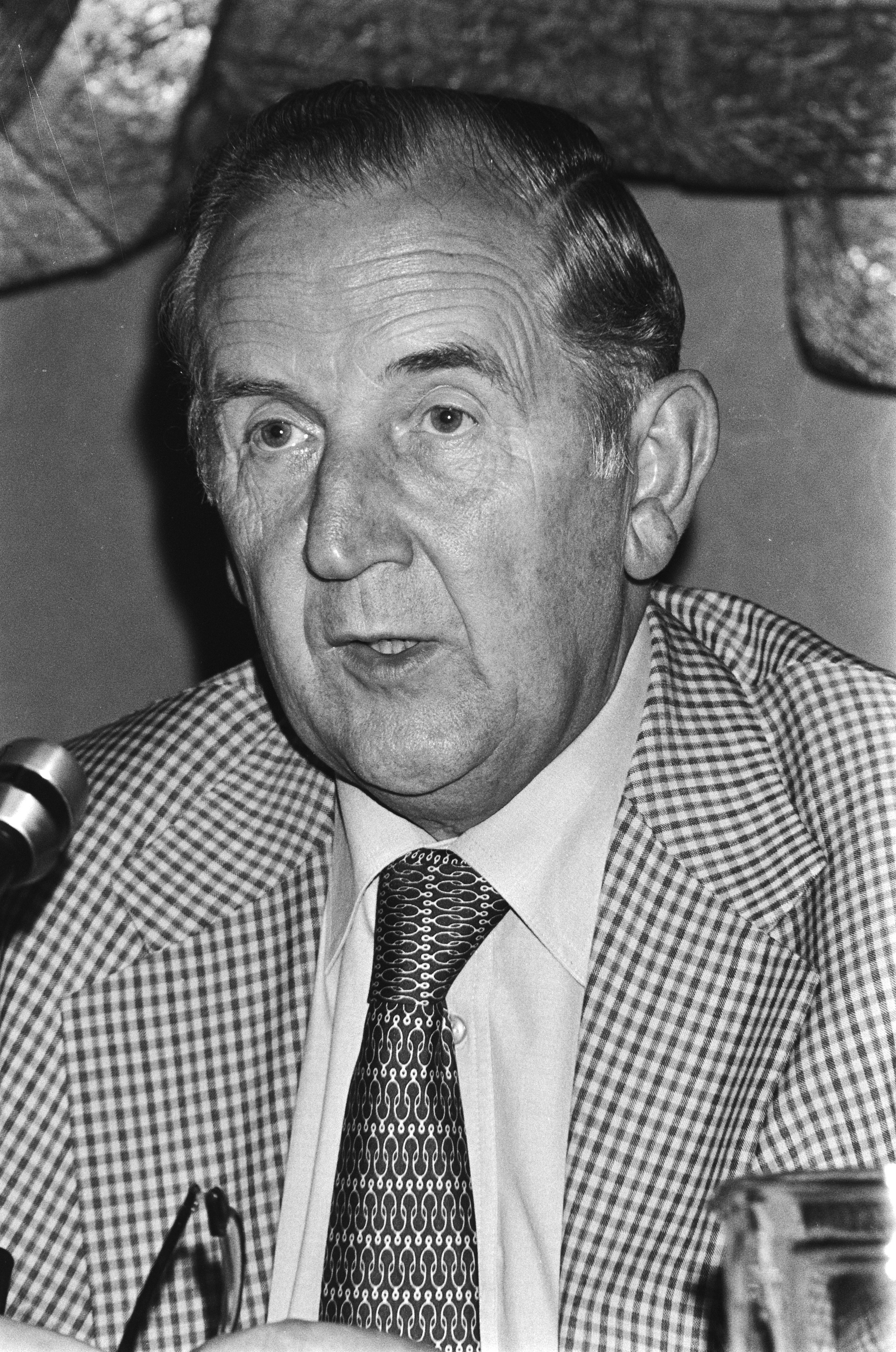
- Chris van Veen in 1980

Extraordinary Member of the Council of State
- In office 1 February 1985 – 1 January 1993
- Vice President: Willem Scholten

Member of the Social and Economic Council
- In office 1 September 1973 – 1 November 1984
- Chairman: Jan de Pous

Minister for Higher Education and Science Policy
- In office 21 July 1972 – 11 May 1973
- Prime Minister: Barend Biesheuvel
- Preceded by: Mauk de Brauw
- Succeeded by: Boy Trip as Minister for Science Policy

Minister of Education and Sciences
- In office 6 July 1971 – 11 May 1973
- Prime Minister: Barend Biesheuvel
- Preceded by: Gerard Veringa
- Succeeded by: Jos van Kemenade

Member of the House of Representatives
- In office 11 May 1971 – 6 July 1971
- Parliamentary group: Christian Historical Union

State Secretary for the Interior
- In office 10 May 1967 – 6 July 1971
- Prime Minister: Piet de Jong
- Preceded by: Theo Westerhout
- Succeeded by: Jan van Stuijvenberg

Personal details
- Born: Christiaan van Veen; 19 December 1922 Barneveld, Netherlands
- Died: 9 November 2009 (aged 86) The Hague, Netherlands
- Party: Christian Democratic Appeal (from 1980)
- Other political affiliations: Christian Historical Union (until 1980)
- Spouse: Petronilla de Korte (m. 1951)
- Education: Free University Amsterdam (Bachelor of Laws, Master of Laws)
- Occupation: Politician · Civil servant · Jurist · Nonprofit director · Trade association executive

Christiaan "Chris" van Veen (19 December 1922 – 9 November 2009) was a Dutch politician of the defunct Christian Historical Union (CHU) party now merged into the Christian Democratic Appeal (CDA) party and trade association executive.

== Biography ==
Van Veen worked as a civil servant for the municipality of Den Bommel from February 1940 until September 1945 and for the municipality of Rijswijk from September 1945 until April 1960. Van Veen applied at the Free University Amsterdam in June 1952 majoring in Law and obtaining a Bachelor of Laws degree in July 1953 and graduating with a Master of Laws degree in June 1955. Van Veen worked as a civil servant for the municipality of Hoogeveen as city clerk from April 1960 until October 1964 and for the municipality of Groningen as city clerk from October 1964 until May 1967.

After the election of 1967 Van Veen was appointed as State Secretary for the Interior in the Cabinet De Jong, taking office on 10 May 1967. Van Veen was elected as a Member of the House of Representatives after the election of 1971, taking office on 11 May 1971. Following the cabinet formation of 1971 Van Veen was appointment as Minister of Education and Sciences in the Cabinet Biesheuvel I, taking office on 6 July 1971. The Cabinet Biesheuvel I fell just one year later on 19 July 1972 and continued to serve in a demissionary capacity with Van Veen taking over as Minister for Higher Education and Science Policy on 21 July 1972 until it was replaced by the caretaker Cabinet Biesheuvel II with Van Veen continuing as Minister of Education and Sciences and Minister for Higher Education and Science Policy, taking office on 9 August 1972. In October 1972 Van Veen announced his retirement from national politics and that he would not stand for the election of 1972. The Cabinet Biesheuvel II was replaced by the Cabinet Den Uyl following the cabinet formation of 1972 on 11 May 1973.

Van Veen semi-retired from national politics and became active in the public sector, in August 1973 Van Veen was nominated as a trade association executive for the Industry and Employers' association, serving as Vice Chairman from 1 September 1973 until 1 January 1974. In December 1974 Van Veen was nominated as Chairman of the Industry and Employers' association serving from 1 January 1974 until 1 November 1984. Van Veen was nominated as an Extraordinary Member of the Council of State, serving from 1 February 1985 until 1 January 1993. Van Veen remained active in the public sector and continued to occupied numerous seats as a nonprofit director on several boards of directors and supervisory boards (Radio Netherlands Worldwide and the Centre for European Policy Studies) and served on several state commissions and councils on behalf of the government (Public Pension Funds APB, Raad voor Cultuur, SEO Economic Research and the Social and Economic Council) . Van Veen was known for his abilities as a manager and consensus builder. Van Veen continued to comment on political affairs until his death at the age of 86.

== Decorations ==
Honours
Ribbon bar	Honour	Country	Date	Comment
	Grand Officer of the Order of Orange-Nassau	Netherlands	30 April 1984	Elevated from Officer (8 June 1973)

Political offices
Preceded by Theo Westerhout	State Secretary for the Interior; 1967–1971	Succeeded by Jan van Stuijvenberg
Preceded by Gerard Veringa	Minister of Education and Sciences; 1971–1973	Succeeded by Jos van Kemenade
Preceded by Mauk de Brauw	Minister for Higher; Education and Science Policy; 1972–1973	Succeeded by Boy Trip as Minister for Science Policy
Non-profit organization positions
Unknown	Vice Chairman of the Executive Board of the Industry and Employers' association 1973–1974	Unknown
Unknown	Chairman of the Executive Board of the Industry and Employers' association 1974–1984	Succeeded by Kees van Lede
