= Democratic Socialists '70 =

Democratic Socialists '70 Democratisch Socialisten '70
- Abbreviation: DS'70
- Leader: Willem Drees Jr. (1971–1977); Ruud Nijhof (1977–1981)
- Chairperson: Jan van Stuijvenberg (1970–1971); Fred Polak (1971–1973); Mauk de Brauw (1973–1975); Henk Staneke (1975–1977); Zalman Hartog (1977–1983)
- Founder: Frans Goedhart; Jan van Stuijvenberg; Wybrand Schuitemaker; Sal Tas
- Founded: 4 April 1970; 56 years ago
- Dissolved: 15 January 1983; 43 years ago
- Split from: Labour Party
- Headquarters: Amsterdam
- Youth wing: Sociaal-Demokratisch Jongeren Aktief (SDJA)
- Thinktank: Stichting Wetenschappelijk Instituut DS'70
- Ideology: Social democracy; Social liberalism; Anti-communism; Social conservatism
- Political position: Centre to centre-left
- Colours: Red (official); Purple (customary)

The Democratic Socialists '70 (Dutch: Democratisch Socialisten '70, DS'70) was a social democratic political party in the Netherlands.

== History ==
DS'70 was founded on 4 April 1970 as the result of a split from the Labour Party (PvdA). In June 1970, Frans Goedhart and Wybrand Schuitemaker, two members of the House of Representatives, left the PvdA and became members of DS'70 because of the anti-American position the PvdA had taken in the Vietnam War. They had previously been frustrated by its cooperation with other left-wing parties such as the Pacifist Socialist Party and its left-wing fiscal policy. In its declaration of principles (Beginselverklaring), DS'70 argued that whilst the People's Party for Freedom and Democracy (VVD) lacked the comprehension of the necessity of social and economic reforms, the PvdA had acquired "anarchist" and unrealistic pacifist aspirations.

In the 1971 general election, the party won eight seats in parliament. After the elections, the party cooperated in the first Biesheuvel cabinet, together with the VVD, Anti-Revolutionary Party (ARP), Christian Historical Union (CHU) and Catholic People's Party (KVP). The party supplied two ministers and two junior ministers, among them the party leader, Willem Drees Jr., who became minister of Transport and Water Works. In 1972, the cabinet fell because of the opposition of DS'70 to the proposed budget. DS'70 ministers refused to accept budget cuts in their own departments. In the 1972 general election, the party lost two seats, and it was confined to opposition to the PvdA-headed Den Uyl cabinet.

Shortly after its foundation, two factions developed within DS'70, namely the social democratic faction led by Jan van Stuijvenberg and the anti-communist faction led by Frans Goedhart. In 1975 this division led to a conflict. The party leader Willem Drees Jr. was seen as conservatively social democratic, lacking a willingness to reform and the ability to oppose the Den Uyl cabinet fiercely. However, Drees won the conflict, and a group of prominent members left the party. In the 1977 general election the party was left with only one seat which it lost at the 1981 general election. In 1983, the party was officially dissolved.

== Ideology ==
DS'70 saw itself as a social democratic party. Its founders thought that the mainstream Dutch social democratic party PvdA was becoming too radical in its economic and international policy and that the New Left was having too great an impact on the PvdA. DS'70 was a fiercely anti-communist party.

The party was economically liberal, supporting a balanced budget. It also supported strong economic growth. One of its main issues was battling inflation, therefore the party wanted to restrict government spending and implement the principle of profit for many government services.

The DS'70 was critical towards immigration; the party wanted to restrict the migration of Dutch citizens from Suriname. However, DS'70 was progressive on other issues: The party did support a modern natural environmental policy with strong public transport and restrained automobile use. It thought that economic growth and sustainability were compatible.

In the late 1970s and early 1980s, the party became more socially conservative, emphasizing family values and civic society. However, the party still saw itself as a social democratic party focusing on solidarity and community solutions.

== Linked organisations ==
DS'70 lacked the links with other societal organisations that many Dutch parties had. The party magazine was called Political Bulletin of DS'70, and since 1978 Buitenhof (Outer Court, in contrast with the Inner Court, the nickname of the buildings of the Dutch parliament and government). Its youth organisation was the Social Democratic Youth Active.

== Important figures ==
Willem Drees Jr. was party leader between 1971 and 1977. He was minister of Transport and Water Works and lead candidate in the 1971, 1972 and 1977 elections. Drees lost the last two elections and was criticized for his alleged solistic behaviour and lack of charisma. He was the son of former Prime Minister Willem Drees. His father left the PvdA during the 1970s, but he did not join his son's party. At the beginning of the 1980s, the famous Dutch chess player Max Euwe featured as a DS'70 lijstduwer in the elections for the House of Representatives.

== Electorate ==
The party was supported by former PvdA, VVD and Democrats 66 voters and undecided voters. The party was mainly supported by middle-class voters (e.g. civil servants). Unlike other left-wing parties, the DS'70 scored particularly well in more prosperous municipalities. In 1972, the party scored its best result in Rozendaal (10.5%), where the DS'70 was almost bigger than the PvdA. In municipalities such as Wassenaar, De Bilt and Naarden the party also performed above average.

== Electoral results ==
House of Representatives
Election	Lead candidate	Votes	%	Seats	+/-
1971	Willem Drees Jr.	336,788	5.33	8 / 150	New
1972	Willem Drees Jr.	304,714	4.12	6 / 150	▼2
1977	Willem Drees Jr.	59,487	0.72	1 / 150	▼5
1981	Ruud Nijhof	48,568	0.56	0 / 150	▼1
1982	Ruud Nijhof	31,047	0.38	0 / 150	0
