= Jaap Nunes Vaz =

Dutch writer (1906–1943)

Jacob Nunes Vaz
- Born: 20 September 1906; Amsterdam, Netherlands
- Died: 13 March 1943 (aged 36); Sobibór extermination camp
- Occupations: Journalist, editor
- Writing career
- Pen name: Jaap Nunes Vaz
- Genre: Column

Jacob (Jaap) Nunes Vaz (20 September 1906 – 13 March 1943) was a Dutch journalist, writer, and editor. He was one of the main editors of Het Parool, an illegal Dutch newspaper founded during World War II.

== Early life ==
Jaap Nunes Vaz was born in Amsterdam on 20 September 1906 to Isaac Nunes Vaz and Daatje Kinsbergen. Isaac's father was of Sephardic Jewish ancestry and both of his parents were of Ashkenazi Jewish ancestry. Jaap became a journalist once he graduated from school and joined the Onafhankelijke Socialistische Partij, a revolutionary socialist political party in the Netherlands. He held multiple jobs at different press agencies including Algemeen Nederlands Persbureau where he was a star reporter at the time of the German invasion. He was fired from his job in the fall of 1940 after the "Aryan Declaration".

== Het Parool ==
Nunes Vaz hosted the first meeting of the Het Parool editorial board in his room on the Keizersgracht. He worked on the editorial board until he became the 5th executive editor, writing lead articles for the paper.

== Death ==
On 25 October 1942, Nunes Vaz was arrested by the Gestapo after his hiding place was discovered in Wageningen. He was first sent to a convict prison in Scheveningen nicknamed "Orange Hotel" but was eventually transferred to Sobibór extermination camp via Westerbork where he was murdered on 13 March 1943.
