= Frans Goedhart =

Dutch politician (1904–1990)

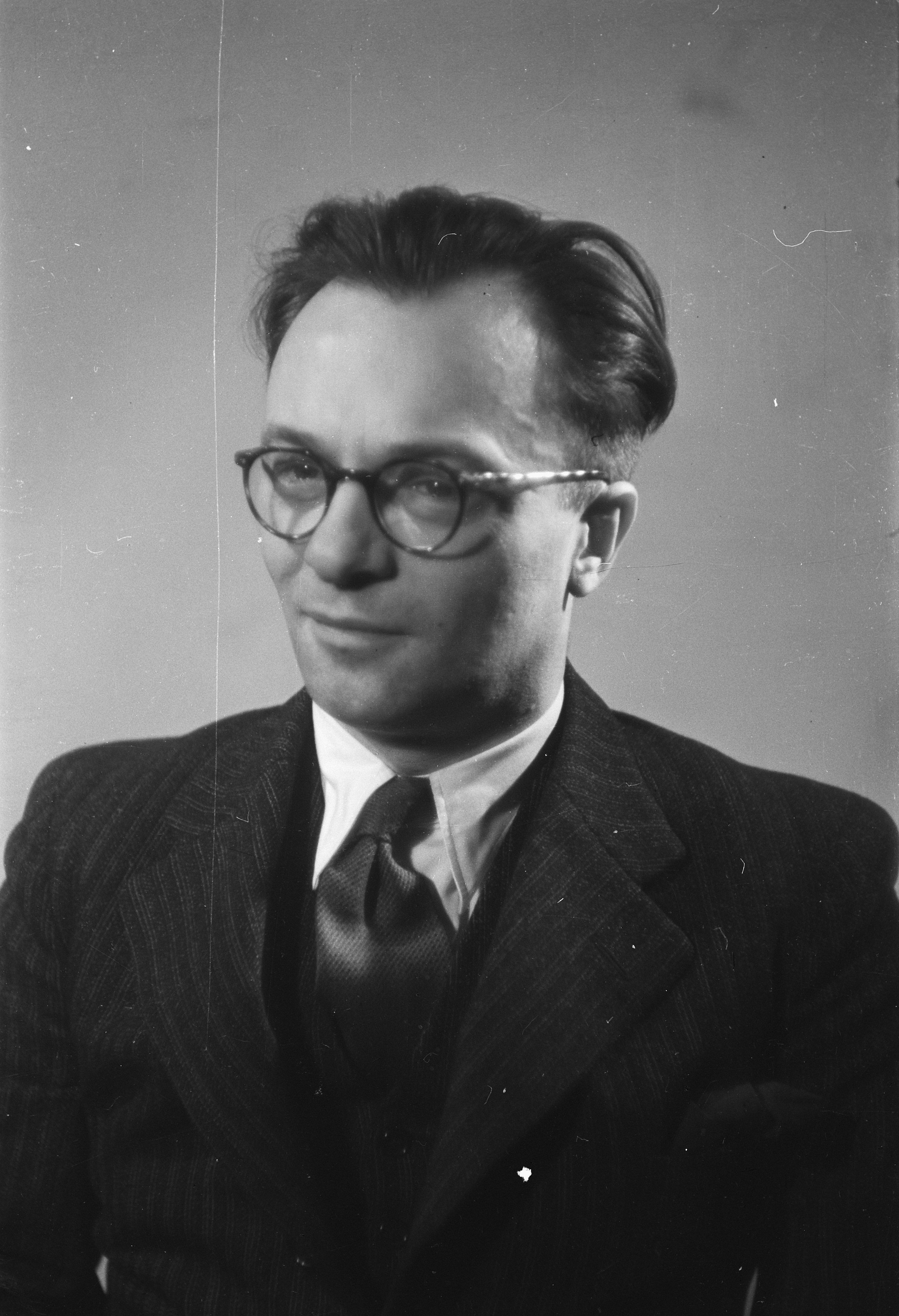
- Goedhart, c. 1955

Member of the House of Representatives
- In office 20 November 1945 – 4 June 1946; 8 October 1946 – 10 May 1971

Personal details
- Born: Frans Johannes Goedhart; 25 January 1904 Amsterdam, Netherlands
- Died: 3 March 1990 (aged 86) Amsterdam, Netherlands
- Party: Labour Party (PvdA), Democratic Socialists '70
- Occupation: Journalist

Frans Johannes Goedhart (25 January 1904 – 3 March 1990) was a Dutch journalist, politician and during World War II member of the Dutch resistance. Having spent most of his youth in orphanages and having received little formal education Goedhart became a journalist for several local and regional newspapers in the 1930s. During this period Goedhart became a fierce anti-communist and anti-fascist and became wishful of political reform based on socialism.

Goedhart was active in the Dutch resistance to the German occupation of the Netherlands in World War II. Under the war pseudonym Pieter 't Hoen he founded a newsletter which later became the illegal newspaper Het Parool. In January 1942 he tried to flee to England but was captured, although he was sentenced to death he managed to escape in August 1943. He then returned to his newspaper which obtained widespread circulation during the later years of the war.

After the war Goedhart became more politically active and sought a reform of the political system in which he tried to use Het Parool as a political vehicle. He became a member of the House of Representatives for the Labour Party (PvdA) in 1946 and would stay a member until the early 1970s. In the House he developed himself as a supporter of Indonesian independence of the Netherlands and became a staunch supporter of anti-communism. Goedhart became a contentious figure, clashing both at his newspaper and with his party members.

== Early life ==
Goedhart was born on 25 January 1904 in Amsterdam. His father, also named Frans Johannes Goedhart, was a masseur who died when he was six years old. His mother was Catharina Gerarda Loep. After his father's death Goedhart spent time in several orphanages. He followed his early education in Dieren.

Goedhart became an apprentice journalist in 1922 when he started working for the Velpsche Courant. One year later he became a full journalist for the Arnhemse Courant where he worked until 1924. In that year he joined the national newspaper De Telegraaf. In 1926 he was fired due to his asthma. He then moved to Belgium where he worked for Het Laatste Nieuws in Brussels until 1931. He worked as a journalist for De Tribune between 1932 and 1934. In 1938 he became a correspondent for the Belgian daily newspaper Vooruit.

== World War II journalism ==
Goedhart became a fierce critic of the declared neutrality of the Netherlands in the interwar period, being an antifascist himself. Shortly after the Netherlands was occupied by Nazi Germany in May 1940 Goedhart became active in the Dutch Resistance. He found the attitude of Dutch newspapers to the occupation unbearable and decided to write his own material. On 25 July 1940 he published his first illegal newsletter, the Nieuwsbrief van Pieter 't Hoen. Pieter 't Hoen was Goedhart's war pseudonym. The namesake of his pseudonym was an 18th-century Dutch journalist whom he admired. The first newsletter was stenciled and reproduced 500 times, Goedhart had it distributed to several well-known Dutch people as well as barber shops in the hope they would put it in their reading material. A total of 27 editions of the newsletter were produced between July 1940 and April 1941. The newsletter became the resistance newspaper Het Parool in February 1941. With the namechange the newsletter also stopped being a one-person production and developed a board of editors of which Wiardi Beckman and Koos Vorrink became members. Goedhart served as publisher of Het Parool between January 1941 and 1945.

On 18 January 1942 Goedhart tried to flee the Netherlands by escaping on a boat to England. This attempt near Scheveningen, together with Wiardi Beckman failed and both were captured by the Sicherheitsdienst. In December 1942 he stood trial with 22 others in what became the first Het Parool-trial. Goedhart was subsequently sentenced to death. He was imprisoned for over a year and a half, he managed to escape during a transport in Kamp Vught on 2 August 1943. After his escape Goedhart resumed his activities for Het Parool, where during his absence Gerrit Jan van Heuven Goedhart and three others had kept the newspaper going. During the war the newspaper managed to reach a circulation of 30,000.

After the war ended he served as temporary chief editor of Het Parool until September 1945. He lost an election to become chief editor to Van Heuven Goedhart. Goedhart subsequently became chair of the Het Parool foundation, as which he served until 1956. In that year he became regular member of the board of the foundation, which he stayed until 1970.

== Political career ==
Although without political office Goedhart was politically involved with the Communist Party of Holland in the 1930s. In 1934 he was expelled from the party after he refused to break contact with people protecting Marinus van der Lubbe from communist slander. From that moment until 9 February 1946 he held no party membership. Goedhart developed an aversion of communism and became a socialist.

In May 1945 Goedhart became a member of the Nederlandse Volksbeweging, a political reform movement. After the total Liberation of the Netherlands in 1945 Goedhart became member of the Nationale Adviescommissie, which was in place between 20 July and 20 November 1945. In the emergency parliament (Dutch:Noodparlement) that followed the commission he also served as member. In March 1946 his efforts in the board of the Nederlandse Volksbeweging and leader of the Parool-group within it, led to his membership on the board of the Labour Party (Dutch: Partij van de Arbeid, PvdA), which had been founded in February the same year.

In May 1946 the first general elections after World War II were held, in the elections Goedhart lost his seat in parliament. He went to the Dutch East Indies where the preamble to the Indonesian National Revolution was taking place with Indonesian nationalists gaining more ground. Goedhart became sympathetic of the nationalists, thereby presenting a different picture than most Dutch journalists. Goedhart however managed to return to the House of Representatives in October the same year as Wim Schermerhorn gave up his seat to head the Commissie-Generaal voor Nederlandsch-Indië.

Goedhart felt passionate about two things after the war: his role as journalist at Het Parool, for which he continued to write articles, and on the other hand he had his membership of the House of Representatives. He had a vision in which Het Parool would become a vehicle for political reform and he used that in his political career. This however brought him into conflict both within his own party as well at Het Parool. In his role as Chair of the Het Parool foundation he had frequent arguments over the political course of the newspaper with chief editors Gerrit Jan van Heuven Goedhart and later with P.J. Koets.

As member of the House Goedhart had three focus points: the introduction of a planned economy with social security, letting go of the neutrality principle of the Netherlands, and thirdly ending colonial relations.

In July 1947 Goedhart went once more to Indonesia, this time as Labour Party board advisor. His open support for Indonesia's call for independence had driven a rift in the First Beel cabinet of which his Labour Party was part. His party leader, Koos Vorrink, chose to send Goedhart to Indonesia to make the point of view of the Labour Party better understood in the coalition government.

While in Indonesia Goedhart became an unofficial negotiator in the rising conflict between the Netherlands and Indonesia. During his presence the first of the two Politionele acties started, Operation Product. Goedhart felt betrayed by the government, and especially by Wim Schermerhorn of the Labour Party. Embittered by the events he returned to the Netherlands but stayed part of the House and the Labour Party. He argued for a quick solution to the problems in Indonesia. After the second Politionele actie, Operation Kraai, had started Goedhart became the first to question the government over excessive use of force by the Dutch military. In 1952 he became a fierce critic of the new Indonesian government of Sukarno, which he saw as struggling under corruption and chaos and thereby could be a possible victim to communism.

After Indonesia gained independence in 1949 Goedhart could focus on other affairs, such as the communist takeover of Eastern-Europe, which concerned him greatly. During the 1950s and 1960s he politically supported the United States, France and Israel in conflicts as the Suez Crisis, Six-Day War and Vietnam War.

In 1966 he was an opponent of a law which would grant a marriage between Crown Princess Beatrix of the Netherlands and German national Claus von Amsberg. He was one of five Labour Party members to vote against it.

In May 1970 Goedhart left the Labour Party after being discontent with the party disproval of the American actions in the Vietnam War. Together with one other House member he formed the Group-Goedhart. Goedhart became associated with the Democratic Socialists '70, a party which was formed from discontent Labour Party members. His time in the House of Representatives ended on 10 May 1971. In 1974 he ended his active political career.

== Personal life ==
Goedhart was married twice. He first married in July 1929 and the marriage was dissolved on 12 November 1945. A month later, he married for the second time on 13 December 1945. Goedhart had three children, a son from his first marriage and a son and daughter from his second marriage.

He was made Knight in the Order of the Netherlands Lion on 29 April 1955. On 20 November 1970 this was upgraded to Commander, due to his membership of the House of Representatives for twenty-five years.

He died on 3 March 1990 in Amsterdam.

Madelon de Keizer wrote Goedhart's biography titled: Frans Goedhart. Journalist en politicus 1904–1990. The book was published in 2012. De Keizer met Goedhart in 1981 and afterwards frequently met him to discuss Het Parool. In 1985 Goedhart ended contact with De Keizer after being discontented with a public talk by her on the connection between Het Parool and the founding of the Labour Party. Goedhart's wife and children later did collaborate with her.
