= Willem Drees Jr. =

Dutch politician (1922–1998)

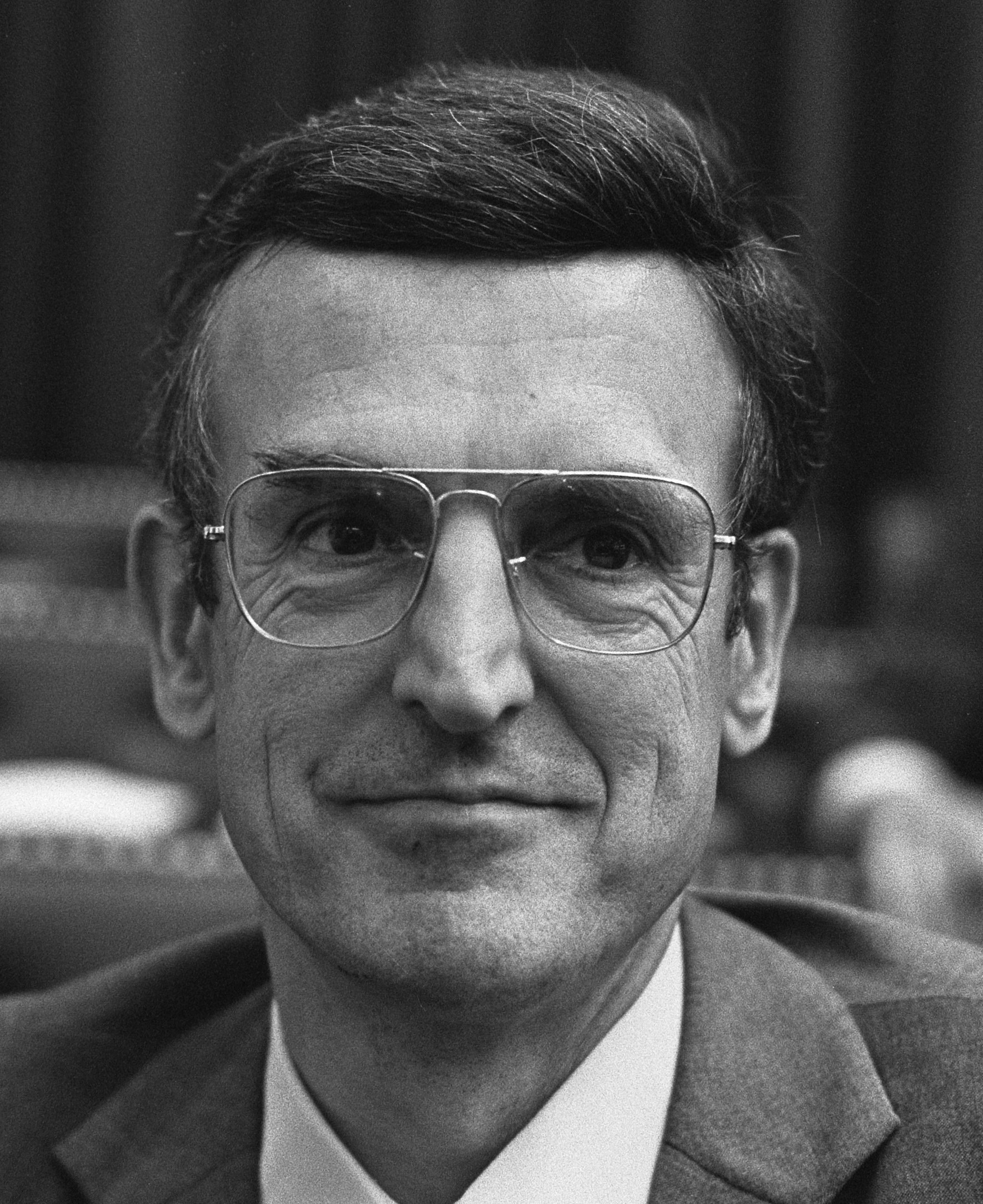
- Willem Drees Jr. in 1973

Member of the Court of Audit
- In office 4 October 1977 – 1 January 1984
- Chair: Harry Peschar

Minister of Transport and Water Management
- In office 6 July 1971 – 21 July 1972
- Prime Minister: Barend Biesheuvel
- Preceded by: Joop Bakker
- Succeeded by: Bé Udink

Parliamentary leader in the House of Representatives
- In office 5 September 1972 – 20 August 1977
- Preceded by: Jan Berger
- Succeeded by: Ruud Nijhof
- In office 11 May 1971 – 6 July 1971
- Preceded by: Office established
- Succeeded by: Jan Berger
- Parliamentary group: Democratic Socialists '70

Member of the House of Representatives
- In office 5 September 1972 – 20 August 1977
- In office 11 May 1971 – 6 July 1971

Leader of the Democratic Socialists '70
- In office 8 January 1971 – 20 August 1977
- Preceded by: Office established
- Succeeded by: Ruud Nijhof

Personal details
- Born: Willem Drees Jr. 24 December 1922 The Hague, Netherlands
- Died: 5 September 1998 (aged 75) The Hague, Netherlands
- Party: Democratic Socialists '70 (1970–1983)
- Other political affiliations: Labour Party (1946–1970); Social Democratic Workers' Party (1945–1946)
- Spouse: Anna Gescher (m. 1947; died 1988)
- Children: Marijke Drees (born 1948); Fransien Drees (born 1950); Willem B. Drees (born 1954) and 2 other daughters
- Parent: Willem Drees (father)
- Relatives: Jacques Wallage (son-in-law)
- Education: Erasmus University Rotterdam (Bachelor of Economics, Master of Economics, Doctor of Philosophy)
- Occupation: Politician · Civil servant · Economist · Accountant · Mathematician · Financial analyst · Nonprofit director · Professor

Willem "Wim" Drees Jr. (24 December 1922 – 5 September 1998) was a Dutch politician of the Democratic Socialists '70 (DS'70) party and economist.

Son of former Prime Minister of the Netherlands Willem Drees, he was a member of the Labour Party from 1946 until 1970. He served as Parliamentary leader of the Democratic Socialists '70 in the House of Representatives from 29 April 1971 and a Member of the House of Representatives from 11 May 1971. He became Minister of Transport and Water Management in the Cabinet Biesheuvel I serving from 6 July 1971 until 21 July 1972. He returned to the House of Representatives on 5 September 1972 and again became Parliamentary leader in the House of Representatives on 14 May 1973. He resigned his positions on 20 August 1977 and retired as Leader of the Democratic Socialists '70 the same day.

== Biography ==
=== Education ===
After attending Gymnasium Haganum from 1934 to 1940, Drees studied at the Erasmus University Rotterdam from 1940 to 1946, and gained his doctorate there in 1955.

=== Early career ===
Drees worked as a civil servant for the Ministry of Colonial Affairs in Batavia, Dutch East Indies from 1945 until 1947 and as a financial analyst at the International Monetary Fund (IMF) from 1947 until 1950. Drees worked as Deputy Director of the Bureau for Economic Policy Analysis from 1 January 1950 until 1 January 1956 and as a civil servant for the Ministry of Finance as Director-General of the department for Budgetary Affairs from 1 January 1956 until 1 September 1969. In August 1969 Drees was appointed as Treasurer-General, serving from 1 September 1969 until 8 January 1971.

=== Political career ===
In December 1970 Drees was approached by Jan van Stuijvenberg, the chairman of the newly founded Democratic Socialists '70 (DS'70), a relatively right-wing split from the Labour Party, to seek the leadership for the 1971 general election. Drees accepted and was unopposed in his candidacy and was elected as leader and became the lead candidate of the Democratic Socialists '70 for the election on 8 January 1971; he resigned as Treasurer-General that same day

After the election the Democratic Socialists '70 entered the House of Representatives with 8 seats. Drees became the parliamentary leader of the Democratic Socialists '70 in the House of Representatives, taking office on 11 May 1971. Following the cabinet formation of 1971, Drees was appointed as Minister of Transport and Water Management in the Biesheuvel I cabinet, taking office on 6 July 1971. The cabinet fell just one year later on 19 July 1972 after DS'70 retracted its support following their dissatisfaction with the proposed budget memorandum to further reduce the deficit. The DS'70 cabinet members resigned on 21 July 1972. For the 1972 general election Drees again served as lead candidate. The Democratic Socialists '70 suffered a small loss, retaining 6 seats in the House of Representatives. Drees returned to the House of Representatives and resumed his position as his party's parliamentary leader, taking office on 5 September 1972. For the 1977 general election Drees once more served as lead candidate. DS'70 suffered a big loss, losing 5 seats and keeping only 1 seat in the House of Representatives. Drees took responsibility for the defeat and subsequently announced he was stepping down as party leader, parliamentary leader and member of the House of Representative on 20 August 1977.

Drees semi-retired from active politics and became active in the public sector, in September 1977 Drees was nominated as a Member of the Court of Audit, serving from 4 October 1977 until 1 January 1984. After his retirement, Drees occupied numerous seats as a nonprofit director in the public sector (International Institute of Social History, Society for Statistics and Operations Research, Transnational Institute, Stichting Pensioenfonds ABP, European Cultural Foundation and the International Statistical Institute).

=== Family ===
On 3 February 1947, he married Anna Erica Gescher (born 26 October 1922). They had five children; four girls and one son Willem B. Drees, their third child, became a philosopher. Anna Erica Drees-Gescher died on 12 May 1988 at the age of 65. Willem Drees Jr. died on 5 September 1998 at the age of 75. Relatively young compared to his parents; his father Willem Drees died at the age of 101 and his mother Catharina Hent died at the age of 85.

== Decorations ==
Honours
Ribbon bar	Honour	Country	Date	Comment
	Knight of the Order of the Netherlands Lion	Netherlands	30 April 1970	
	Commander of the Order of Orange-Nassau	Netherlands	8 June 1973	

Civic offices
Preceded by Emiel van Lennep	Treasurer-General; 1969–1971	Succeeded by Coen Oort
Party political offices
New political party	Leader of the Democratic Socialists '70; 1971–1977	Succeeded by Ruud Nijhof
New political party	Lead candidate of the Democratic Socialists '70; 1971, 1972, 1977	Succeeded by Ruud Nijhof; 1981
New political party	Parliamentary leader of the Democratic Socialists '70 in the House of Representatives; 1971	Succeeded by Jan Berger
Preceded by Jan Berger	Parliamentary leader of the Democratic Socialists '70 in the House of Representatives; 1972–1977	Succeeded by Ruud Nijhof
Political offices
Preceded by Joop Bakker	Minister of Transport and Water Management; 1971–1972	Succeeded by Bé Udink
