= Fred Polak =

Dutch futurologist

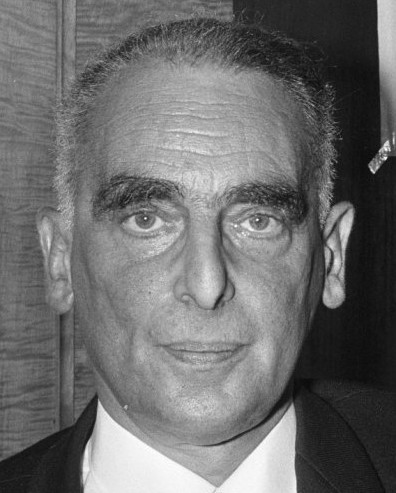
Fred Polak (1970)

Frederik Lodewijk Polak (21 May 1907, in Amsterdam – 17 September 1985, in Wassenaar) was one of the Dutch founding fathers of futures studies, perhaps best known in the field for theorising the central role of imagined alternative futures in his classic work The Image of the Future.

== Life and work ==
Polak was the son of Alexander Polak, violin builder and concertmaster of the Concertgebouw Orchestra, and Janet Kiek, who founded the first Home Economics Budget Bureau. He studied law and economics in Amsterdam and, before the Second World War, was a member of the Board of Directors of a large chain of stores in the Netherlands. In 1936 he married the poet Louise Moor. As a Jew, Polak spent the war years in hiding and preparing a PhD thesis in philosophy.

After the war he became a staff member and managing director of the Netherlands' Central Planning Bureau, personal advisor to the Minister of Education (Art and Science), advisor of the Dutch government for Full Employment, Professor of Sociology at Erasmus University Rotterdam and Managing Director of an industrial organization at Twente (Netherlands).

Polak was a Senator for the (Social-Democratic) Labour Party and later became a cofounder of the political party DS70.

Polak graduated cum laude in philosophy in 1946, and since his thesis and inaugural address in 1947 on the evolution of science and society of tomorrow, devoted himself continuously to the future of man and society.

Author of many publications on futurology, Polak was recipient of Fellowships from UNESCO, the Ford Foundation, and the Council of Europe which awarded him a prize for the two-volume book The Image of the Future. He was the founder and first president of Teleac (Dutch television academy), co-founder and vice-president of the Erasmus Prize Foundation, and scientific advisor for long-term planning to numerous concerns in the Netherlands. He was engaged in setting up an institute for long-term future research and development in the Netherlands and was also Secretary-General of the International Society for Technology Assessment.

== Reception ==
A 2005 article by Ruud van der Helm states: "Among the founders of the futures studies field, the Dutch sociologist Fred Polak is one of the least known. Although he is still mentioned by several renowned futurists, very little has been written about the evolution of Polak’s ideas and as far as we have been able to trace back, no retrospective work has been published. Today, Polak is mostly known for his opus magnum The Image of the Future, an impressive cultural-historic study of the relation between imagined futures and the dynamics of culture. He was an original thinker, but his work was remarkably uneven: his encyclopaedic and erudite style has led to both very deep and very shallow analyses. Especially his earlier contributions in the 1950s and 1960s still prove a very valuable resource, although many of his ideas should be handled with care. However, his later works in the 1970s are out of tune with the rise of a more critical approach to the study of the future."

== Selected publications ==
- The Image of the Future
- Kennen en keuren in de sociale wetenschappen (dissertatie Rotterdam, 1947)
- De wentelgang der wetenschap en de maatschappij van morgen (inaugurele rede Rotterdam, 1948)
- De toekomst is verleden tijd (Utrecht, 1955), translated into Engels as 'The Image of the Future'(1973)
- Hoopvolle toekomstperspectieven (1957)
- De nieuwe wereld der automatie (1958)
- Het hoger onderwijs: op de helling of op een hellend vlak? (1961)
- Hoe veroveren wij de toekomst? (1965)
- Prognostica. Two Volumes (Deventer, 1968)
- Prognostica. One volume edition. (edited by Henri van Praag)
- Prognostics: a science in the making surveys and creates the future. (Amsterdam, New York, 1971)
- De contraclub van Rome (Amsterdam/Brussel, 1972)
- Lof der botheid (Amsterdam/Brussel, 1973)
- Slow-motion mens. Een dier gedoemd tot uitsterven? (Amsterdam/Brussel, 1977)
- Vermetelste uitdaging. Leeft de Nieuwe Hemel in harmonie met God? (Alphen aan den Rijn, 1979)
- Wereldvrede blijft. Hoe Goliath door David met een ultraklein wapen opnieuw kan worden geveld (Baarn, 1983)
- Morgen is anders. De wedloop tussen mensen en kunst-mensen (Baarn, 1985)
