= Simon Carmiggelt =

Dutch writer, journalist, and poet

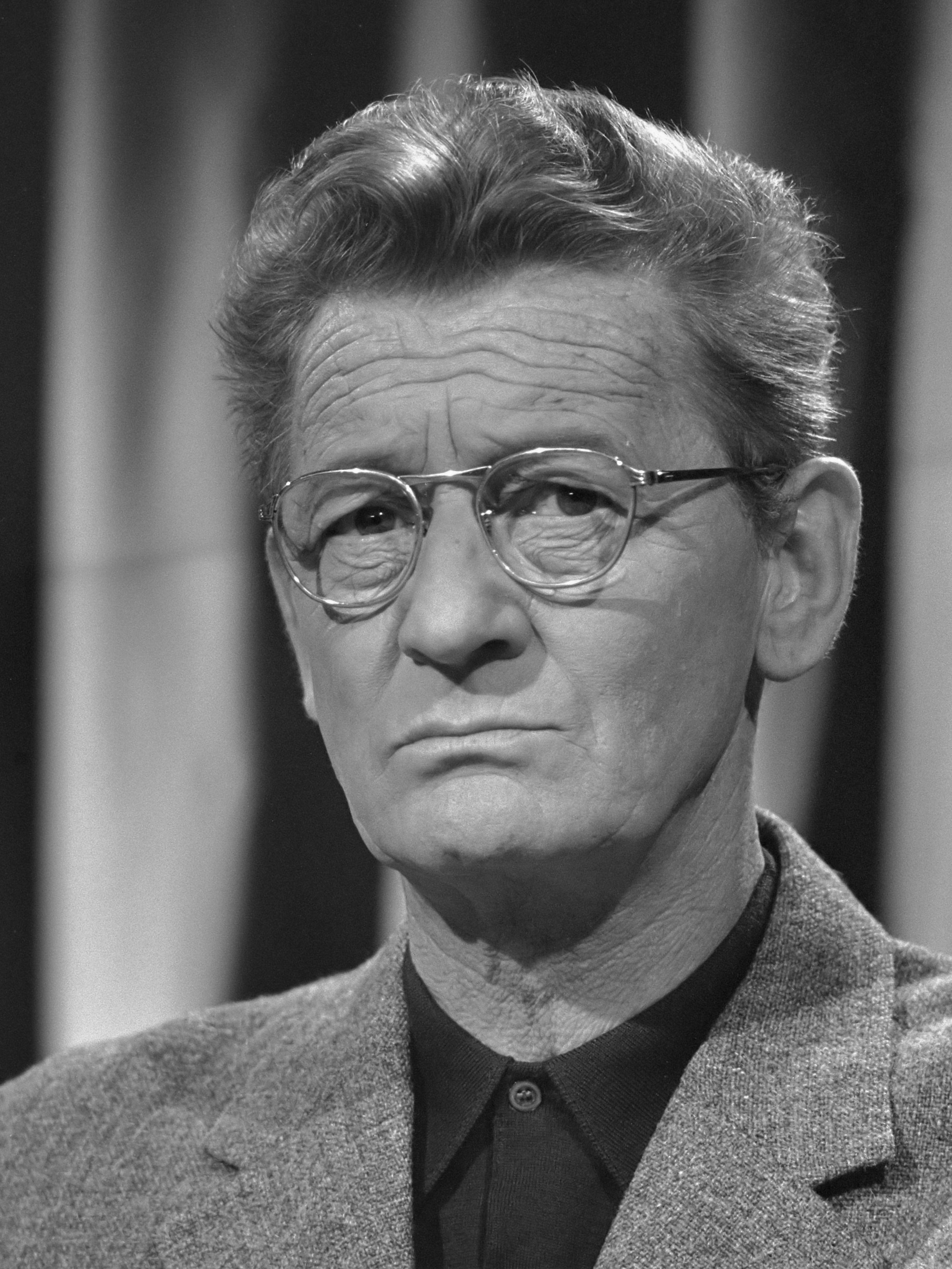
- Carmiggelt in 1973
- Born: 7 October 1913; The Hague, Netherlands
- Died: 30 November 1987 (aged 74); Amsterdam, Netherlands
- Occupations: Columnist, journalist, poet
- Writing career
- Pen name: Kronkel, Karel Bralleput.
- Genres: Column, short story

Simon Carmiggelt (Dutch pronunciation: [ˈsimɔŋ kɑrˈmɪɣəlt]; 7 October 1913 – 30 November 1987) was a Dutch writer, journalist, and poet who became a well known public figure in the Netherlands because of his daily newspaper columns and his television appearances.

== Biography ==
Simon Johannes Carmiggelt was born on 7 October 1913 in The Hague, the second son of Herman Carmiggelt and Adriana Bik. He had one older brother, Jan (Johannes Simon). Simon did poorly in school and he left secondary school in 1929. He enjoyed working as an editor for the school paper though, and he was determined to become a journalist.

After various editorial jobs, he became a reporter for the socialist newspaper Het Volk ("The People"). Later on he worked for the same paper as a drama critic. He wrote short columns about daily life in The Hague, which he called Kleinigheden ("Trifles"). In 1939 Simon married Tiny de Goey. A year later she gave birth to a daughter, Marianne. In the same year the first collection of Kleinigheden was published, named Vijftig dwaasheden ("Fifty follies").

When Nazi Germany invaded the Netherlands in 1940 and Het Volk was taken over and censored, Carmiggelt resigned from the paper. During the Second World War he had all sorts of small jobs, but he secretly got in touch with the Dutch resistance and worked for the underground newspaper Het Parool ("The Password"). He was responsible for the lay-out and printing of the paper. He wrote a few stories for Het Parool.

Under the German occupation of the Netherlands, Simon's brother Jan was arrested by the Nazis in 1943 for aiding persons in hiding. He was taken to Herzogenbusch concentration camp, where he died of exhaustion on 26 September 1943. Jan's death was to change the rest of Simon's life; he would never fully overcome the trauma it caused.

After the war he again started to write columns for Het Parool; he signed them with the pen name Kronkel ("Twist", or "Kink"). His Kronkels became known for their melancholic, sometimes sombre tone and the ironic use of formal language. Many columns were about unsuccessful, disillusioned people in cafes and bars (often in Amsterdam, where he then lived), who told the writer about their lives. Carmiggelt wrote about his children and later his grandchildren, his cats and other small events in his life. His work became popular and he received various Dutch literary prizes. Together with the Dutch-Indo author and essayist Tjalie Robinson he is credited with establishing a whole new genre in Dutch literature that found successors like Rudy Kousbroek.

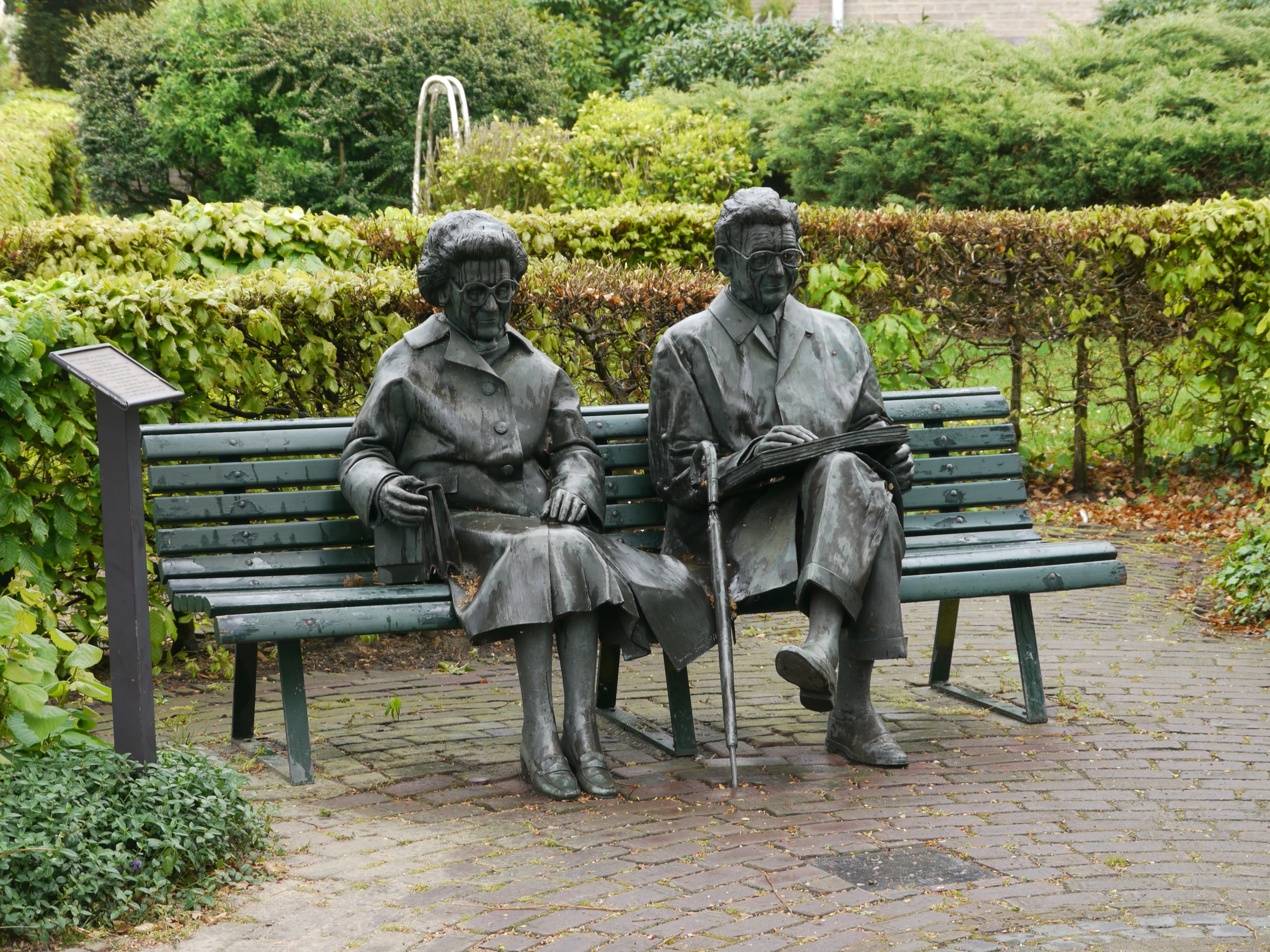
Statue of Simon Carmiggelt with his wife Tiny on a park bench in De Steeg

In 1977 Carmiggelt started an affair with author Renate Rubinstein. She wrote a book about this, titled Mijn beter ik (My better self), which was published when both she and Simon had died. Carmiggelt's last Kronkel was published in 1983. On 30 November 1987 he died of a heart attack. A year after his death, a statue of Carmiggelt (made by Kees Verkade) was placed near his former house in Amsterdam and one of him and his wife on a park bench near his summer house in De Steeg (Rheden). This last statue was stolen in the weekend of 21 January 2012. It was retrieved on 25 January, sawn into many pieces. Three men have been arrested in relation to this event; the motive is still unclear. The statue was pieced together by the sculptor Wik Kuijl and then re-unveiled in its original site on 23 January 2013.

== Selected bibliography ==
- 1940 - Vijftig dwaasheden
- 1940 - Honderd dwaasheden (extended version of Vijftig dwaasheden)
- 1941 - Johan Justus Jacob
- 1948 - Allemaal onzin
- 1948 - Het jammerhout
- 1950 - Klein beginnen
- 1951 - Omnibus
- 1952 - Poespas
- 1954 - Al mijn gal
- 1954 - Articles de Paris
- 1955 - Duivenmelken
- 1956 - Fabriekswater
- 1956 - Kwartet
- 1956 - Spijbelen
- 1957 - Haasje over
- 1959 - Een toontje lager
- 1961 - Alle orgels slapen
- 1961 - Een stoet van dwergen
- 1962 - Dag opa
- 1962 - Kroeglopen I
- 1962 - Tussen twee stoelen
- 1963 - Oude mensen
- 1963 - We leven nog
- 1964 - Later is te laat
- 1964 - Kinderen (combination of Klein beginnen en Dag opa)
- 1965 - Kroeglopen II
- 1965 - Fluiten in het donker
- 1965 - Mooi weer vandaag
- 1967 - Morgen zien we wel weer
- 1968 - Drie van vroeger
- 1968 - Je blijft lachen
- 1969 - Mijn moeder had gelijk
- 1970 - Twijfelen is toegestaan
- 1971 - Gewoon maar doorgaan
- 1972 - Ik mag niet mopperen
- 1973 - Elke ochtend opstaan
- 1974 - Brood voor de vogeltjes
- 1975 - Slenteren
- 1975 - Maatschappelijk verkeer
- 1976 - Dwaasheden (1976)
- 1977 - Vroeger kon je lachen
- 1978 - Bemoei je d'r niet mee
- 1979 - De rest van je leven
- 1979 - Mooi kado
- 1980 - De avond valt
- 1980 - Residentie van mijn jeugd
- 1981 - Een Hollander in Parijs
- 1981 - Verhaaltjes van vroeger
- 1982 - Welverdiende onrust
- 1983 - De Amsterdamse kroeg
- 1983 - Met de neus in de boeken
- 1983 - Mag 't een ietsje meer zijn
- 1984 - Ik red me wel
- 1984 - Vreugden en verschrikkingen van de dronkenschap
- 1984 - Alle kroegverhalen (combination of Kroeglopen I en ~II)
- 1985 - Ontmoetingen met Willem Elsschot
- 1986 - Bij nader omzien
- 1986 - Trio voor één hand
- 1987 - De vrolijke jaren
- 1987 - Het literaire leven
- 1989 - Zelfportret in stukjes
- 1990 - De kuise drinker
- 1992 - Schemeren
- 1993 - Van u heb ik ook een heleboel gelezen...
- 1995 - Thelonious en Picasso
- 1999 - Beste Godfried, beste Simon
- 1999 - Voorhout

=== Translations ===
==== English ====
- 1957 - A Dutchman's slight adventures
- 1958 - Amsterdam by Simon Carmiggelt, Maria Austria, and Flora van Os-Gammon
- 1972 - I'm just kidding: More of a Dutchman's slight adventures

==== Esperanto ====
- 2002 - Morgau denove ni vidu

==== German ====
- 1990 - Heiteres Aus Amsterdam. Erzaehlungen; Simon Carmiggelt und Marga Baumer
