= Third Balkenende cabinet =

Cabinet of the Netherlands, 2006 to 2007

- Cabinet of the Netherlands

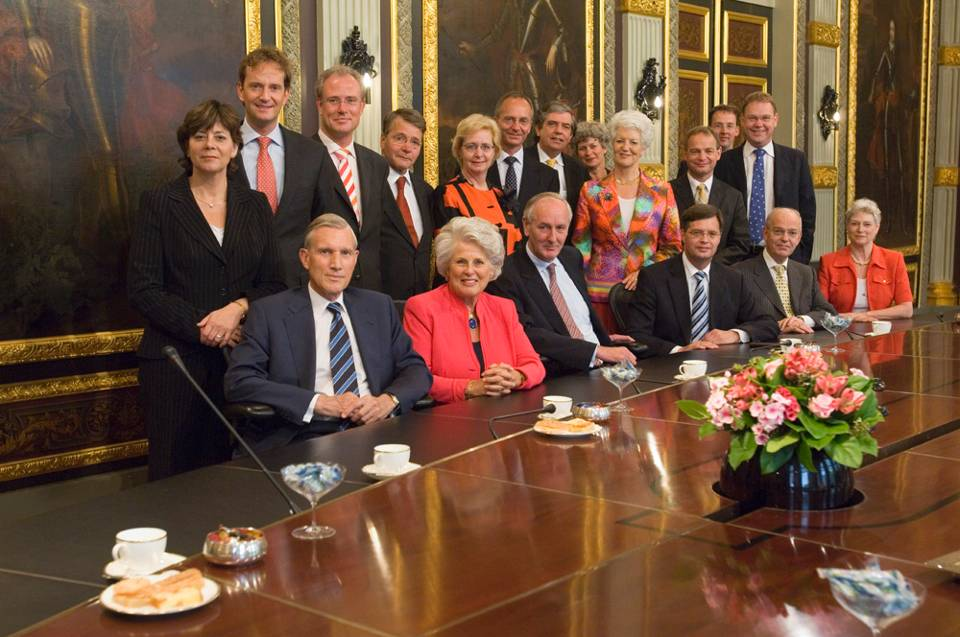
- The installation of the third Balkenende cabinet on 7 July 2006
- Date formed: 7 July 2006
- Date dissolved: 22 February 2007; 230 days in office (Demissionary from 22 November 2006)

People and organisations
- Monarch: Queen Beatrix
- Prime Minister: Jan Peter Balkenende
- Deputy Prime Minister: Gerrit Zalm
- No. of ministers: 16
- Ministers removed: 2
- Total no. of members: 18
- Member party: Christian Democratic Appeal (CDA); People's Party for Freedom and Democracy (VVD)
- Status in legislature: Demissionary centre-right minority government

History
- Outgoing election: 2006 election
- Legislature terms: 2003–2007
- Outgoing formation: 2006–2007 formation
- Predecessor: Second Balkenende cabinet
- Successor: Fourth Balkenende cabinet

The third Balkenende cabinet was the executive branch of the Government of the Netherlands from 7 July 2006 until 22 February 2007. The cabinet was formed by the Christian-democratic Christian Democratic Appeal (CDA) and the conservative-liberal People's Party for Freedom and Democracy (VVD) after the fall of the second Balkenende cabinet. The caretaker rump cabinet was a centre-right coalition and had a minority in the House of Representatives with Christian Democratic Leader Jan Peter Balkenende serving as Prime Minister. Former Liberal Leader Gerrit Zalm continued as Deputy Prime Minister and Minister of Finance.

The cabinet served during the middle years of unstable 2000s. Domestically, its primary objective was to make preparations for a snap election in 2006, but immigration was also a major point of attention. Internationally, it had to deal with the war on terror and the government support for the Iraq War. The cabinet suffered several major internal and external conflicts, such as the resignations of Justice Minister Donner and Housing Minister Dekker following a critical rapport by the Dutch Safety Board about the fire at the Amsterdam Airport Schiphol that killed 11 people, and Immigration Minister Verdonk losing the portfolio of Immigration and Asylum following a motion of no confidence. Following the election the cabinet continued in a demissionary capacity until it was superseded by the fourth Balkenende cabinet.

== Formation ==
Composition of the cabinet in relation to the rest of the legislature

Following the fall of the Second Balkenende cabinet the Democrats 66 (D66) left the coalition and the Christian Democratic Appeal and the People's Party for Freedom and Democracy formed a rump cabinet. On 1 July 2006 Queen Beatrix appointed former Prime Minister Ruud Lubbers (CDA) as Informateur to investigate the possibilities for a caretaker government. Its main tasks were the preparation of the early general election on 22 November 2006 and of the 2007 budget.

The cabinet consisted of 16 ministers and 7 State Secretaries. These positions were distributed among the coalition parties according to their size in parliament: the Christian Democratic Appeal obtained 9 ministers and 4 State Secretaries, and the People's Party for Freedom and Democracy obtained 7 ministers and 3 State Secretaries. All members of this cabinet had also served in the second Balkenende cabinet, except for Bruno Bruins (VVD) the State Secretary for Education, Culture and Science who was scheduled to succeed former State Secretary Mark Rutte (VVD) when the Second Balkenende cabinet fell unexpectedly. State Secretary for Finance Joop Wijn (CDA) and State Secretary for Foreign Affairs Atzo Nicolaï (VVD) were promoted from State Secretaries to Minister of Economic Affairs (Wijn) and Minister for Government Reform and Kingdom Relations (Nicolaï) to replace the Democrats 66 ministers of the second Balkenende cabinet.

== Term ==
Although the constituent parties of the cabinet did not have a majority in the House of Representatives, the cabinet had full power to propose laws, each of which needed to be supported by an ad hoc majority in parliament. Such minority government are rare in Dutch politics; the previous one was the Third Van Agt cabinet from 1982 to 1983, also a rump cabinet. The Christian Democratic Appeal and the People's Party for Freedom and Democracy did have a majority (38 of 75 seats) in the Senate.

=== Schiphol fire ===
On 27 October 2005, a fire erupted at a detention center at Amsterdam Airport Schiphol, resulting in the death of 11 detainees from foreign countries. From the start, doubts were shed on the organisation of the involved government agencies. On 21 September 2006, the Dutch Safety Board presented the final report on the problems in the Schiphol prison. The report explicitly stated that "fewer or even no casualties" would have occurred if the government had upheld the legal safety standards. Based on these harsh conclusions, Minister of Justice Piet Hein Donner (CDA) responsible for prisons, and Minister of Housing, Spatial Planning and the Environment Sybilla Dekker (VVD), responsible for government buildings resigned immediately. The mayor of Haarlemmermeer Fons Hertog, the community in which Amsterdam Airport Schiphol is located, also resigned on the same day.

On 22 September 2006, two new ministers were assigned to the posts left by Donner and Dekker. Ernst Hirsch Ballin of the CDA was the new Minister of Justice. During a much earlier third Lubbers cabinet, he had held the same position, from which he resigned in 1994 after the IRT-affair. Until his appointment as Minister of Justice, he had been a member of the Council of State. A former Minister of the Environment in the first Lubbers cabinet, VVD member Pieter Winsemius resigned as a member of the Scientific Council for Government Policy and replaced Dekker as housing minister.

=== General amnesty ===
On 30 November 2006, the new parliament was sworn in, including several members of the then demissionary cabinet. Because of the election results, this House of Representatives had a majority of parties that opposed the course of the third cabinet Balkenende on important issues. One important election issue was an amnesty for a specific group of asylum seekers. This group originally consisted of 26.000 and later 38.000 people who had been in an administrative immigration process since 2001, and many of their children were raised exclusively in the Netherlands. The Minister for Integration and Immigration Rita Verdonk was looking into each of these dossiers to assess their future: either expulsion or permanent residence. On 1 December, the new House of Representatives adopted a motion to suspend all expulsions of asylum seekers from this group until a final decision on a general amnesty was made. Balkenende reacted annoyed as he stated that this ad hoc left-wing coalition (including PvdA and SP) was not a good basis for negotiations for a stable government. On 5 December, the cabinet declared not to execute this motion for three reasons: first, it claimed that a parliament which deals with a care taker cabinet cannot demand that cabinet to implement new policies; second, it argued that a general amnesty would attract more asylum seeker; third, it raised several questions on what specific groups of asylum seekers should be amnestied and what the legal consequences would be for other groups not included in the amnesty. Minister Verdonk did announce that the expulsion would be suspended until the next parliamentary debate. A majority in the House of Representatives now proposed to stop the expulsion of asylum seekers until formation talks for a new government were finished, and to allow the formation talks to solve this issue. Again, the cabinet refused to execute this motion. On 13 December, the House of Representatives decided to respond to this unwillingness by a motion of no confidence specifically oriented at Minister Verdonk. The leader of the VVD, Mark Rutte announced that if Minister Verdonk would be forced to leave the cabinet all VVD ministers would leave: leaving only seven CDA ministers in the cabinet. On 14 December, the cabinet held a meeting on how to respond to this motion: the cabinet found a solution in a portfolio reshuffle between Verdonk and Ernst Hirsch Balin, the Minister of Justice, who became responsible for immigration, while Verdonk became responsible for youth criminality. Hirsh Balin could then partially execute the House of Representatives motion calling for a temporary halt to expulsions, while the VVD could voice its opposition to this decision, breaking the principle that cabinets speak with one voice.

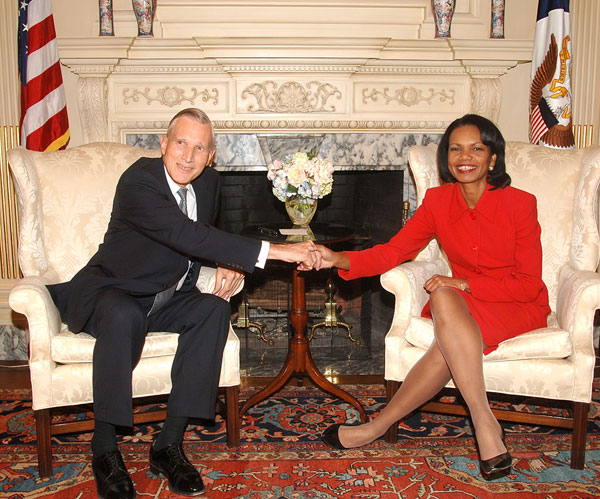
Minister of Foreign Affairs Ben Bot and United States Secretary of State Condoleezza Rice at the United States Department of State in Washington, D.C. on 23 October 2006.

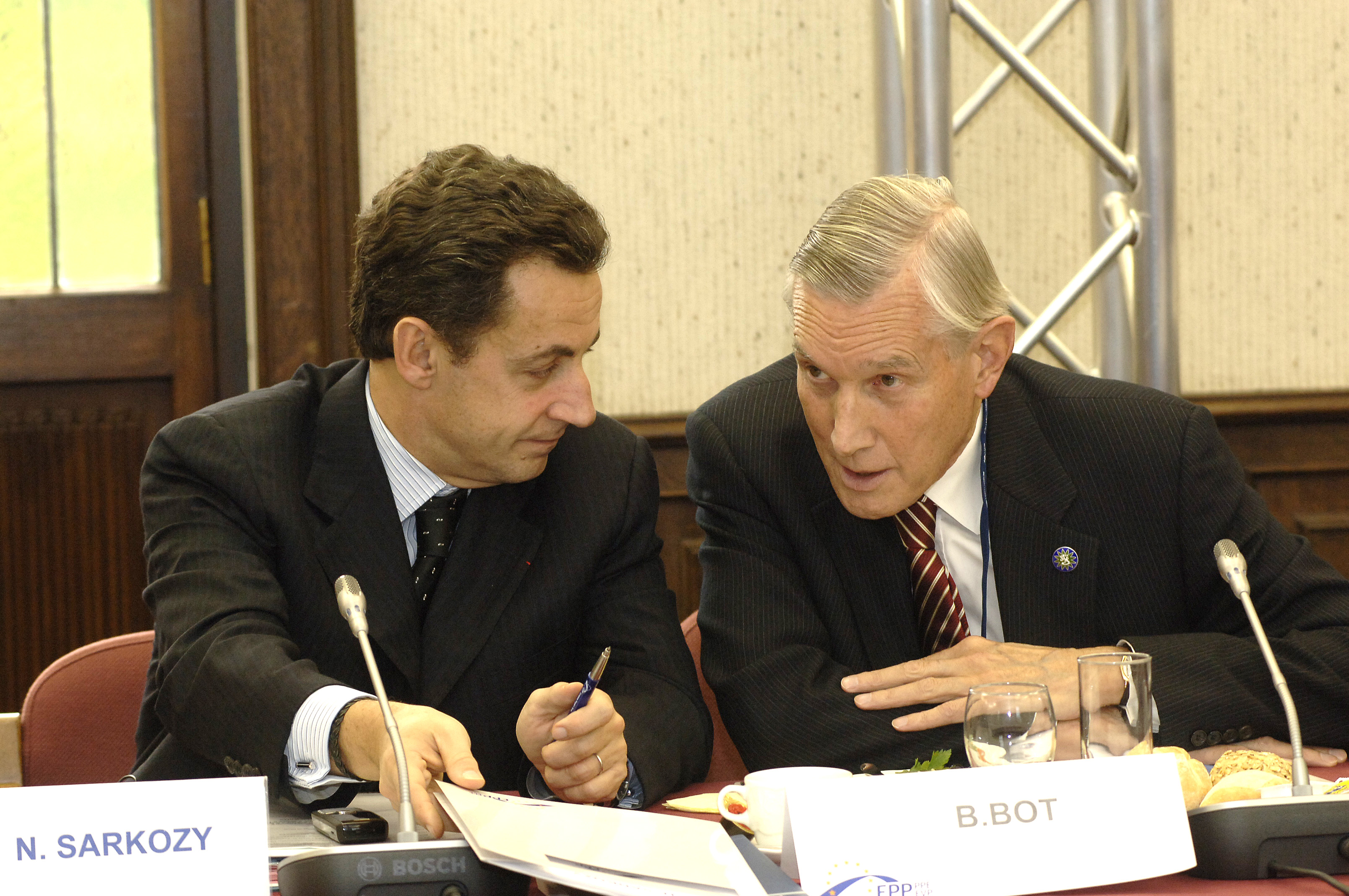
Minister of Foreign Affairs Ben Bot and French Minister of the Interior Nicolas Sarkozy at a European People's Party conference in Meise on 14 December 2006.

== Cabinet members ==
Ministers		Title/Ministry/Portfolio			Term of office	Party
Jan Peter Balkenende	Dr. Jan Peter; Balkenende (born 1956)	Prime Minister	General Affairs		22 July 2002 – 14 October 2010^{[Retained]} ^{[Continued]}	Christian; Democratic Appeal
Gerrit Zalm	Gerrit Zalm (born 1952)	Deputy; Prime Minister	Finance		27 May 2003 – 22 February 2007^{[Retained]}	People's Party for Freedom and Democracy
Gerrit Zalm	Gerrit Zalm (born 1952)	Minister	Finance		27 May 2003 – 22 February 2007^{[Retained]}	People's Party for Freedom and Democracy
Johan Remkes	Johan Remkes (born 1951)	Minister	Interior and Kingdom Relations		22 July 2002 – 22 February 2007^{[Retained]}	People's Party for Freedom and Democracy
Ben Bot	Dr. Ben Bot (born 1937)	Minister	Foreign Affairs		3 December 2003 – 22 February 2007^{[Retained]}	Christian; Democratic Appeal
Piet Hein Donner	Piet Hein Donner (born 1948)	Minister	Justice		22 July 2002 – 21 September 2006^{[Retained]} ^{[Res]}	Christian; Democratic Appeal
Rita Verdonk	Rita Verdonk (born 1955)	Minister	Justice		21 September 2006 – 22 September 2006^{[Ad Interim]}	People's Party for Freedom and Democracy
Ernst Hirsch Ballin	Dr. Ernst Hirsch Ballin (born 1950)	Minister	Justice		22 September 2006 – 14 October 2010^{[Continued]}	Christian; Democratic Appeal
Joop Wijn	Joop Wijn (born 1969)	Minister	Economic Affairs		7 July 2006 – 22 February 2007	Christian; Democratic Appeal
Henk Kamp	Henk Kamp (born 1952)	Minister	Defence		12 December 2002 – 22 February 2007^{[Retained]}	People's Party for Freedom and Democracy
Hans Hoogervorst	Hans Hoogervorst (born 1956)	Minister	Health, Welfare and Sport		27 May 2003 – 22 February 2007^{[Retained]}	People's Party for Freedom and Democracy
Aart Jan de Geus	Aart Jan de Geus (born 1955)	Minister	Social Affairs and Employment		22 July 2002 – 22 February 2007^{[Retained]}	Christian; Democratic Appeal
Maria van der Hoeven	Maria van der Hoeven (born 1949)	Minister	Education, Culture and Science		22 July 2002 – 22 February 2007^{[Retained]}	Christian; Democratic Appeal
Karla Peijs	Karla Peijs (born 1944)	Minister	Transport and Water Management		27 May 2003 – 22 February 2007^{[Retained]}	Christian; Democratic Appeal
Sybilla Dekker	Sybilla Dekker (born 1942)	Minister	Housing, Spatial; Planning and the Environment		23 May 2003 – 21 September 2006^{[Retained]} ^{[Res]}	People's Party for Freedom and Democracy
Karla Peijs	Karla Peijs (born 1944)	Minister	Housing, Spatial; Planning and the Environment		21 September 2006 – 26 September 2006^{[Ad Interim]}	Christian; Democratic Appeal
Pieter Winsemius	Dr. Pieter Winsemius (born 1942)	Minister	Housing, Spatial; Planning and the Environment		26 September 2006 – 22 February 2007	People's Party for Freedom and Democracy
Ministers without portfolio		Title/Ministry/Portfolio(s)			Term of office	Party
Atzo Nicolaï	Atzo Nicolaï (1960–2020)	Minister	Interior and Kingdom Relations	• Civil Reform • Municipalities • Urban Planning • Kingdom; Relations	7 July 2006 – 22 February 2007	People's Party for Freedom and Democracy
Agnes van Ardenne	Agnes van Ardenne (born 1950)	Minister	Foreign Affairs	• Development; Cooperation	27 May 2003 – 22 February 2007^{[Retained]}	Christian; Democratic Appeal
Rita Verdonk	Rita Verdonk (born 1955)	Minister	Justice	• Immigration and Asylum • Integration • Minorities	27 May 2003 – 14 December 2006^{[Retained]}	People's Party for Freedom and Democracy
Rita Verdonk	Rita Verdonk (born 1955)	Minister	Justice	• Integration • Youth Justice • Penitentiaries • Minorities	14 December 2006 – 22 February 2007	People's Party for Freedom and Democracy
State Secretaries		Title/Ministry/Portfolio(s)			Term of office	Party
Karien van Gennip	Karien van Gennip (born 1968)	State Secretary	Economic Affairs	• Trade and Export • Small and Medium-sized; Businesses • Regional; Development • Consumer; Protection • Tourism	27 May 2003 – 22 February 2007^{[Retained]}	Christian; Democratic Appeal
Cees van der Knaap	Cees van der Knaap (born 1951)	State Secretary	Defence	• Human; Resources • Equipment	22 July 2002 – 18 December 2007^{[Retained]} ^{[Continued]}	Christian; Democratic Appeal
	Clémence Ross- van Dorp (born 1957)	State Secretary	Health, Welfare and Sport	• Elderly Care • Youth Care • Disability Policy • Medical Ethics • Sport	22 July 2002 – 22 February 2007^{[Retained]}	Christian; Democratic Appeal
Henk van Hoof	Henk van Hoof (born 1947)	State Secretary	Social Affairs and Employment	• Social Security • Unemployment • Occupational; Safety • Social Services	17 June 2004 – 22 February 2007^{[Retained]}	People's Party for Freedom and Democracy
Bruno Bruins	Bruno Bruins (born 1963)	State Secretary	Education, Culture and Science	• Higher; Education • Adult; Education • Science Policy	29 June 2006 – 22 February 2007^{[Retained]}	People's Party for Freedom and Democracy
Melanie Schultz van Haegen	Melanie Schultz van Haegen (born 1970)	State Secretary	Transport and Water Management	• Public; Infrastructure • Public; Transport • Aviation • Rail Transport • Water; Management • Weather; Forecasting	22 July 2002 – 22 February 2007^{[Retained]}	People's Party for Freedom and Democracy
Pieter van Geel	Pieter van Geel (born 1951)	State Secretary	Housing, Spatial; Planning and the Environment	• Environmental; Policy	22 July 2002 – 22 February 2007^{[Retained]}	Christian; Democratic Appeal

^{Resigned}
^{Ad Interim}
^{Continued in the next cabinet}
^{Retained from the previous cabinet}

== Trivia ==
- Five cabinet members had previous experience as scholars and professors: Jan Peter Balkenende (Christian Theology), Gerrit Zalm (Political Economics), Piet Hein Donner (Civil Law), Ernst Hirsch Ballin (Constitutional and Administrative Law) and Pieter Winsemius (Natural Science).
- The age difference between oldest cabinet member Ben Bot (born 1937) and the youngest cabinet member Melanie Schultz van Haegen (born 1970) was 32 years, 219 days.
- Pieter Winsemius had earlier served as Minister of Housing 20 years, 74 days before in the First Lubbers cabinet.
