= List of ministers of justice of the Netherlands =

Minister of Justice and Security of the Netherlands
- Minister van Justitie en Veiligheid
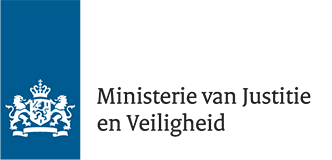
- Ministry of Justice and Security

- Flag of the Kingdom of the Netherlands

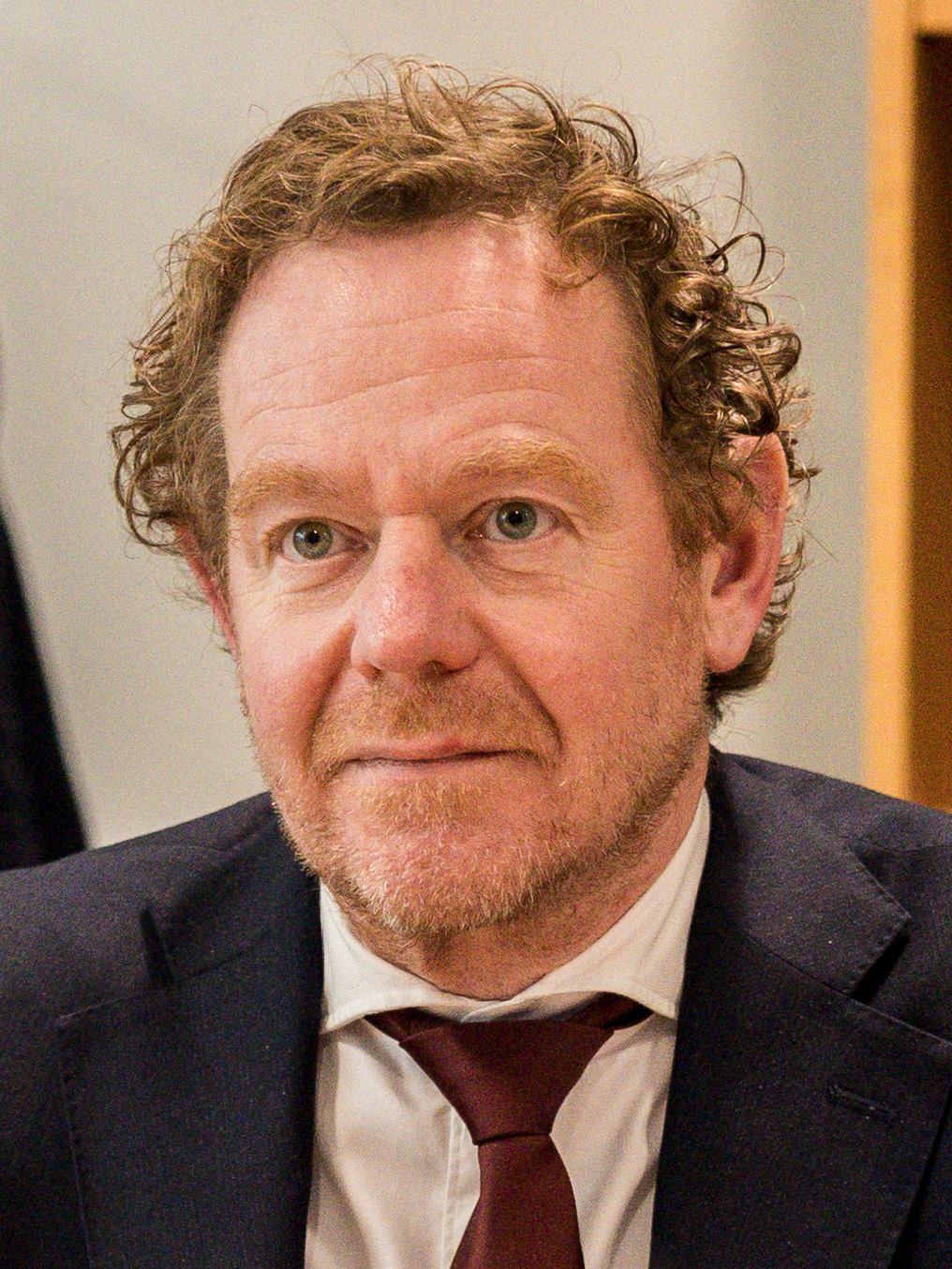
- Incumbent; David van Weel since 23 February 2026
- Ministry of Justice and Security
- Style: His/Her Excellency
- Member of: Council of Ministers
- Appointer: The monarch on advice of the prime minister
- Formation: 12 March 1798; 228 years ago
- First holder: Reinier Willem Tadama as Secretary for Justice
- Salary: €170.000 (as of 2022 excluding expenses)
- Website: Minister of Justice and Security

The minister of justice and security (Dutch: Minister van Justitie en Veiligheid) is the head of the Ministry of Justice and Security and a member of the Cabinet and the Council of Ministers. The current minister is David van Weel of the People's Party for Freedom and Democracy (VVD) who has been in office since 23 February 2026. Regularly, a state secretary is assigned to the ministry, tasked with specific portfolios. Occasionally, there has also been a minister without portfolio assigned to the ministry who is also giving specific portfolios.

== Agents of justice (1798) ==
Portrait	Name	Term of office		Party	Government
Reinier Willem Tadama	Reinier Willem Tadama	12 March 1798	26 October 1798	Unitarian	Uitvoerend Bewind
Jan Reuvens	Jan Reuvens	12 March 1798	26 October 1798	Moderate	Uitvoerend Bewind

== Secretaries of state of justice (1801–1802) ==
Portrait	Name	Term of office		Party	Government
Jan Reuvens	Jan Reuvens	18 December 1801	1 March 1802	Moderate	Staatsbewind

== Directors-general of justice and police (1806) ==
Portrait	Name	Term of office		Party	Grand Pensionary
Jan van Hooff	Jan van Hooff	4 July 1806	29 July 1806	Moderate Unitarian	Rutger Jan Schimmelpenninck

== Ministers of justice and police (1806–1813) ==
Portrait	Name	Term of office		Party	Monarch
Jan van Hooff	Jan van Hooff	29 July 1806	22 May 1807	Moderate Unitarian	Louis I
Jacob Jan Cambier	Jacob Jan Cambier	20 November 1807	10 December 1807	Moderate	Louis I
Alexander van Hugenpoth tot Aerdt	Alexander van Hugenpoth tot Aerdt	27 May 1809	31 December 1810	Moderate	Louis I

== Ministers of justice (1815–1848) ==
Minister of Justice		Term of office		Party	Monarch
Cornelis Felix van Maanen	Cornelis Felix van Maanen	16 September 1815	3 September 1830	Independent	William I
Cornelis Felix van Maanen	Cornelis Felix van Maanen	16 September 1815	3 September 1830	Independent	William II
Floris Adriaan van Hall	Floris Adriaan van Hall	1 April 1842	7 March 1844	Independent	William II
Marinus Willem de Jonge van Campensnieuwland	Marinus Willem de Jonge van Campensnieuwland	7 March 1844	19 March 1848	Independent	William II

== Ministers of justice (1848–2010) ==
Minister of Justice		Term of office		Party	Cabinet
Dirk Donker Curtius	Dirk Donker Curtius	19 March 1848	4 June 1849	Independent	Schimmelpenninck
Dirk Donker Curtius	Dirk Donker Curtius	19 March 1848	4 June 1849	Independent	De Kempenaer-Donker Curtius
Hendrik Ludolf Wichers	Hendrik Ludolf Wichers	4 June 1849	1 November 1849	Independent	De Kempenaer-Donker Curtius
Johan Theodoor Hendrik Nedermeyer, Knight van Rosenthal	Johan Theodoor Hendrik Nedermeyer van Rosenthal	1 November 1849	15 July 1852	Independent	Thorbecke I
Martin Pascal Hubert Strens	Martin Pascal Hubert Strens	15 July 1852	19 April 1853	Independent	Thorbecke I
Dirk Donker Curtius	Dirk Donker Curtius	19 April 1853	1 July 1856	Independent	Van Hall-Donker Curtius
Justinus van der Brugghen	Justinus van der Brugghen	1 July 1856	18 March 1858	Independent	Van der Brugghen
Cornelis Hendrik Boudewijn Boot	Cornelis Hendrik Boudewijn Boot	18 March 1858	23 February 1860	Independent	Rochussen
Michel Henry Godefroi	Michel Henry Godefroi	23 February 1860	1 February 1862	Independent	Van Hall-Van Heemstra
Michel Henry Godefroi	Michel Henry Godefroi	23 February 1860	1 February 1862	Independent	Van Zuylen van Nijevelt-Van Heemstra
Nicolaas Olivier	Nicolaas Olivier	1 February 1862	10 February 1866	Independent	Thorbecke II
Carolus Joannes Pické	Carolus Joannes Pické	10 February 1866	1 June 1866	Independent	Fransen van de Putte
	Eduard Borret (1816–1867)	1 June 1866	10 November 1867^{[Died]}	Independent; Christian Democrat (Conservative Catholic)	Van Zuylen van Nijevelt
Jan Heemskerk	Dr. Jan Heemskerk (Minister of the Interior) (1818–1897)	10 November 1867	4 January 1868^{[Ad interim]}	Independent; Conservative (Liberal Conservative)	Van Zuylen van Nijevelt
	Willem Wintgens (1818–1895)	4 January 1868	4 June 1868	Independent; Conservative (Liberal Conservative)	Van Zuylen van Nijevelt
Franciscus van Lilaar	Franciscus van Lilaar (1823–1889)	4 June 1868	4 January 1871	Independent; Liberal (Classical Liberal)	Van Bosse–Fock
Jolle Albertus Jolles	Dr. Jolle Albertus Jolles (1814–1882)	4 January 1871	6 July 1872	Independent; Liberal (Classical Liberal)	Thorbecke III
Gerrit de Vries	Dr. Gerrit de Vries (Prime Minister) (1818–1900)	6 July 1872	27 August 1874	Independent; Liberal (Classical Liberal)	De Vries–Fransen van de Putte
Theo van Lynden van Sandenburg	Count; Theo van Lynden van Sandenburg (1826–1885)	27 August 1874	3 November 1877	Independent; Christian Democrat (Protestant)	Heemskerk–Van Lynden van Sandenburg
Hendrik Jan Smidt	Hendrik Jan Smidt (1831–1917)	3 November 1877	20 August 1879	Independent; Liberal (Conservative Liberal)	Kappeyne van de Coppello
Anthony Modderman	Dr. Anthony Modderman (1838–1885)	20 August 1879	23 April 1883	Independent; Liberal (Classical Liberal)	Van Lynden van Sandenburg
Marc Willem du Tour van Bellinchave	Baron; Marc Willem du Tour van Bellinchave (1835–1908)	23 April 1883	21 April 1888	Independent; Conservative (Liberal Conservative)	J. Heemskerk
Gustave Ruijs de Beerenbrouck	Jonkheer; Gustave Ruijs de Beerenbrouck (1842–1926)	21 April 1888	21 August 1892	Independent; Christian Democrat (Conservative Catholic)	Mackay
Hendrik Jan Smidt	Hendrik Jan Smidt (1831–1917)	21 August 1892	9 May 1894	Independent; Liberal (Conservative Liberal)	Van Tienhoven
Willem van der Kaay	Willem van der Kaay (1831–1918)	9 May 1894	27 July 1897	Independent; Liberal (Classical Liberal)	Röell
Pieter Cort van der Linden	Dr. Pieter Cort van der Linden (1846–1935)	27 July 1897	1 August 1901	Independent; Liberal (Classical Liberal)	Pierson
Jan Loeff	Dr. Jan Loeff (1858–1921)	1 August 1901	17 August 1905	Roman Catholic; State Party	Kuyper
Eduard Ellis van Raalte	Eduard Ellis van Raalte (1841–1921)	17 August 1905	12 February 1908	Free-thinking; Democratic League	De Meester
Anton Nelissen	Anton Nelissen (1851–1921)	12 February 1908	11 May 1910^{[Res]}	Independent; Christian Democrat (Catholic)	T. Heemskerk
Theo Heemskerk	Theo Heemskerk (Prime Minister) (1852–1932)	11 May 1910	7 June 1910^{[Ad interim]}	Anti-Revolutionary Party	T. Heemskerk
Robert Regout	Robert Regout (1863–1913)	7 June 1910	18 January 1913^{[Died]}	Independent; Christian Democrat (Catholic)	T. Heemskerk
Theo Heemskerk	Theo Heemskerk (Prime Minister) (1852–1932)	18 January 1913	29 August 1913^{[Ad interim]}	Anti-Revolutionary Party	T. Heemskerk
Bastiaan Ort	Bastiaan Ort (1854–1927)	29 August 1913	9 September 1918	Independent; Liberal (Classical Liberal)	Cort van der Linden
Theo Heemskerk	Theo Heemskerk (1852–1932)	9 September 1918	4 September 1925	Anti-Revolutionary Party	Ruijs de Beerenbrouck I • II
Jan Schokking	Jan Schokking (1864–1941)	4 September 1925	8 March 1926	Christian Historical Union	Colijn I
Jan Donner	Dr. Jan Donner (1891–1981)	8 March 1926	26 May 1933	Anti-Revolutionary Party	De Geer I
Jan Donner	Dr. Jan Donner (1891–1981)	8 March 1926	26 May 1933	Anti-Revolutionary Party	Ruijs de Beerenbrouck III
Josef van Schaik	Josef van Schaik (1882–1962)	26 May 1933	24 June 1937	Roman Catholic State Party	Colijn II
Josef van Schaik	Josef van Schaik (1882–1962)	26 May 1933	24 June 1937	Roman Catholic State Party	Colijn III
Carel Goseling	Carel Goseling (1891–1941)	24 June 1937	25 July 1939	Roman Catholic; State Party	Colijn IV
Johan de Visser	Johan de Visser (1883–1950)	25 July 1939	10 August 1939	Christian Historical Union	Colijn V
Pieter Sjoerds Gerbrandy	Dr. Pieter Sjoerds Gerbrandy (Prime Minister 1940–1945) (1885–1961)	10 August 1939	21 February 1942	Anti-Revolutionary Party	De Geer II
Pieter Sjoerds Gerbrandy	Dr. Pieter Sjoerds Gerbrandy (Prime Minister 1940–1945) (1885–1961)	10 August 1939	21 February 1942	Anti-Revolutionary Party	Gerbrandy I
Pieter Sjoerds Gerbrandy	Dr. Pieter Sjoerds Gerbrandy (Prime Minister 1940–1945) (1885–1961)	10 August 1939	21 February 1942	Anti-Revolutionary Party	Gerbrandy II
Jan van Angeren	Dr. Jan van Angeren (1894–1959)	21 February 1942	11 July 1944^{[Res]}	Roman Catholic State Party	Gerbrandy II
Gerrit Jan van Heuven Goedhart	Dr. Gerrit Jan van Heuven Goedhart (1901–1956)	11 July 1944	23 February 1945	Independent Socialist (Social Democrat)	Gerbrandy II
Pieter Sjoerds Gerbrandy	Dr. Pieter Sjoerds Gerbrandy (Prime Minister) (1885–1961)	23 February 1945	25 June 1945	Anti-Revolutionary Party	Gerbrandy III
Hans Kolfschoten	Hans Kolfschoten (1903–1984)	25 June 1945	3 July 1946	Roman Catholic State Party	Schermerhorn–Drees
Hans Kolfschoten	Hans Kolfschoten (1903–1984)	25 June 1945	3 July 1946	Catholic People's Party	Schermerhorn–Drees
Johan van Maarseveen	Johan van Maarseveen (1894–1951)	3 July 1946	7 August 1948	Catholic People's Party	Beel I
René Wijers	René Wijers (1891–1973)	7 August 1948	15 May 1950^{[Res]}	Catholic People's Party	Drees–Van Schaik
Johan van Maarseveen	Johan van Maarseveen (1894–1951)	15 May 1950	10 July 1950^{[Ad Interim]} ^{[Minister]}	Catholic People's Party	Drees–Van Schaik
Teun Struycken	Teun Struycken (1906–1977)	10 July 1950	15 March 1951	Catholic People's Party	Drees–Van Schaik
Hendrik Mulderije	Hendrik Mulderije (1896–1970)	15 March 1951	2 September 1952	Christian Historical Union	Drees I
Leen Donker	Leen Donker (1899–1956)	2 September 1952	4 February 1956^{[Died]}	Labour Party	Drees II
Louis Beel	Dr. Louis Beel (1902–1977)^{[Deputy]}	4 February 1956	15 February 1956^{[Ad Interim]} ^{[Minister]}	Catholic People's Party	Drees II
Julius Christiaan van Oven	Dr. Julius Christiaan van Oven (1881–1963)	15 February 1956	13 October 1956^{[Minister]}	Labour Party	Drees II
Ivo Samkalden	Dr. Ivo Samkalden (1912–1995)	13 October 1956	22 December 1958	Labour Party	Drees III
Teun Struycken	Teun Struycken (1906–1977)^{[Deputy]}	22 December 1958	19 May 1959^{[Minister]}	Catholic People's Party	Beel II
Albert Beerman	Albert Beerman (1901–1967)	19 May 1959	24 July 1963	Christian Historical Union	De Quay
Ynso Scholten	Ynso Scholten (1918–1984)	24 July 1963	14 April 1965	Christian Historical Union	Marijnen
Ivo Samkalden	Dr. Ivo Samkalden (1912–1995)	14 April 1965	22 November 1966	Labour Party	Cals
Teun Struycken	Teun Struycken (1906–1977)	22 November 1966	5 April 1967	Catholic People's Party	Zijlstra
Carel Polak	Carel Polak (1909–1981)	5 April 1967	6 July 1971	People's Party for Freedom and Democracy	De Jong
Dries van Agt	Dries van Agt (1931–2024)^{[Deputy]}	6 July 1971	8 September 1977^{[Res]}	Catholic People's Party	Biesheuvel I • II
Dries van Agt	Dries van Agt (1931–2024)^{[Deputy]}	6 July 1971	8 September 1977^{[Res]}	Catholic People's Party	Den Uyl
Gaius de Gaay Fortman	Dr. Gaius de Gaay Fortman (1911–1997)^{[Deputy]}	8 September 1977	19 December 1977^{[Acting]} ^{[Minister]}	Anti-Revolutionary Party	Den Uyl
Job de Ruiter	Job de Ruiter (1930–2015)	19 December 1977	4 November 1982	Christian Democratic Appeal	Van Agt I
Job de Ruiter	Job de Ruiter (1930–2015)	19 December 1977	4 November 1982	Christian Democratic Appeal	Van Agt II
Job de Ruiter	Job de Ruiter (1930–2015)	19 December 1977	4 November 1982	Christian Democratic Appeal	Van Agt III
Frits Korthals Altes	Frits Korthals Altes (1931–2025)	4 November 1982	7 November 1989	People's Party for Freedom and Democracy	Lubbers I • II
Ernst Hirsch Ballin	Dr. Ernst Hirsch Ballin (born 1950)	7 November 1989	27 May 1994^{[Minister]} ^{[Res]}	Christian Democratic Appeal	Lubbers III
Aad Kosto	Aad Kosto (born 1938)	27 May 1994	22 August 1994	Labour Party	Lubbers III
Winnie Sorgdrager	Winnie Sorgdrager (born 1948)	22 August 1994	3 August 1998	Democrats 66	Kok I
Benk Korthals	Benk Korthals (born 1944)	3 August 1998	22 July 2002	People's Party for Freedom and Democracy	Kok II
Piet Hein Donner	Piet Hein Donner (born 1948)	22 July 2002	21 September 2006^{[Res]}	Christian Democratic Appeal	Balkenende I
Piet Hein Donner	Piet Hein Donner (born 1948)	22 July 2002	21 September 2006^{[Res]}	Christian Democratic Appeal	Balkenende II
Piet Hein Donner	Piet Hein Donner (born 1948)	22 July 2002	21 September 2006^{[Res]}	Christian Democratic Appeal	Balkenende III
Rita Verdonk	Rita Verdonk (born 1955)	21 September 2006	22 September 2006^{[Ad Interim]} ^{[Minister]}	People's Party for Freedom and Democracy	Balkenende III
Ernst Hirsch Ballin	Dr. Ernst Hirsch Ballin (born 1950)	22 September 2006	14 October 2010^{[Minister]}	Christian Democratic Appeal	Balkenende III
Ernst Hirsch Ballin	Dr. Ernst Hirsch Ballin (born 1950)	22 September 2006	14 October 2010^{[Minister]}	Christian Democratic Appeal	Balkenende IV

== Ministers of security and justice (2010–2017) ==
Portrait	Name	Term of office		Party	Cabinet
Ivo Opstelten	Ivo Opstelten (born 1944)	14 October 2010	10 March 2015	People's Party for Freedom and Democracy	Rutte I
Ivo Opstelten	Ivo Opstelten (born 1944)	14 October 2010	10 March 2015	People's Party for Freedom and Democracy	Rutte II
Stef Blok	Stef Blok (born 1964)	10 March 2015	20 March 2015; Ad Interim	People's Party for Freedom and Democracy	Rutte II
Ard van der Steur	Ard van der Steur (born 1969)	20 March 2015	27 January 2017	People's Party for Freedom and Democracy	Rutte II
Stef Blok	Stef Blok (born 1964)	27 January 2017	26 October 2017	People's Party for Freedom and Democracy	Rutte II

== Ministers of justice and security (since 2017) ==
Portrait	Name	Term of office		Party	Cabinet
Ferdinand Grapperhaus	Ferdinand Grapperhaus (born 1959)	26 October 2017	10 January 2022	Christian; Democratic; Appeal	Rutte III
	Dilan Yeşilgöz (born 1977)	10 January 2022	2 July 2024	People's Party for Freedom and Democracy	Rutte IV
David van Weel	David van Weel (born 1976)	2 July 2024	5 September 2025	People's Party for Freedom and Democracy	Schoof
Foort van Oosten	Foort van Oosten (born 1977)	5 September 2025	23 February 2026	People's Party for Freedom and Democracy	Schoof
David van Weel	David van Weel (born 1976)	23 February 2026	Incumbent	People's Party for Freedom and Democracy	Jetten

^{Resigned}
^{Acting}
^{Ad Interim}
^{Died in Office}
^{Deputy Prime Minister}
^{Deputy Prime Minister from 11 May 1973}
^{Deputy Prime Minister from 8 September 1977}
^{Minister of the Interior}
^{Minister of the Interior from 7 July 1956}
^{Minister for Kingdom Relations}
^{Minister without Portfolio for Justice}
^{Minister of the Interior and Kingdom Relations from 23 February 2010}
^{Minister without Portfolio for the Interior}

== List of ministers without portfolio ==
Minister without Portfolio		Portfolio(s)	Term of office		Party	Cabinet
Hilbrand Nawijn	Hilbrand Nawijn (born 1948)	• Immigration and Asylum • Integration • Minorities	22 July 2002	27 May 2003	Pim Fortuyn List	Balkenende I
Rita Verdonk	Rita Verdonk (born 1955)	• Immigration and Asylum • Integration • Minorities	27 May 2003	7 July 2006	People's Party for Freedom and Democracy	Balkenende II
Rita Verdonk	Rita Verdonk (born 1955)	• Immigration and Asylum • Integration • Minorities	7 July 2006	14 December 2006	People's Party for Freedom and Democracy	Balkenende III
Rita Verdonk	Rita Verdonk (born 1955)	• Integration • Youth Justice • Penitentiaries • Minorities	14 December 2006 – 22 February 2007		People's Party for Freedom and Democracy	Balkenende III
Sander Dekker	Sander Dekker (born 1975)	• Public; Prosecution • Civil Law • Property Law • Victims' Rights • Judicial Reform • Youth Justice • Penitentiaries • Debt • Gambling	26 October 2017	10 January 2022	People's Party for Freedom and Democracy	Rutte III
Franc Weerwind	Franc Weerwind (born 1964)	• Public; Prosecution • Civil Law • Property Law • Victims' Rights • Judicial Reform • Youth Justice • Penitentiaries • Debt • Gambling	10 January 2022	2 July 2024	Democrats 66	Rutte IV

== List of state secretaries for justice ==
=== State secretaries for Justice ===
State Secretary for Justice		Portfolio(s)	Term of office		Party	Cabinet
Klaas Wiersma	Dr. Klaas Wiersma (1917–1993)	• Immigration and Asylum • Penitentiaries	20 April 1970	6 July 1971	People's Party for Freedom and Democracy	De Jong
Hans Grosheide	Hans Grosheide (1930–2022)	• Immigration and Asylum • Civil Law • Youth Justice • Penitentiaries	28 July 1971	11 May 1973	Anti-Revolutionary Party	Biesheuvel I • II
Jan Glastra van Loon	Dr. Jan Glastra van Loon (1920–2001)	• Immigration and Asylum • Civil Law • Judicial Reform • Youth Justice	13 June 1973	7 May 1975^{[Res]}	Democrats 66	Den Uyl
Henk Zeevalking	Henk Zeevalking (1922–2005)	• Immigration and Asylum • Civil Law • Judicial Reform • Youth Justice	6 June 1975	8 September 1977^{[Res]}	Democrats 66	Den Uyl
Bert Haars	Bert Haars (1913–1997)	• Immigration and Asylum • Judicial Reform • Youth Justice • Penitentiaries	28 December 1977	11 September 1981	Christian Historical Union	Van Agt I
Bert Haars	Bert Haars (1913–1997)	• Immigration and Asylum • Judicial Reform • Youth Justice • Penitentiaries	28 December 1977	11 September 1981	Christian Democratic Appeal	Van Agt I
Michiel Scheltema	Dr. Michiel Scheltema (born 1939)	• Immigration and Asylum • Civil Law • Youth Justice	11 September 1981	4 November 1982	Democrats 66	Van Agt II • III
Virginie Korte-van Hemel	Virginie Korte-van Hemel (1929–2014)	• Immigration and Asylum • Civil Law • Youth Justice • Penitentiaries • Gambling	8 November 1982	7 November 1989	Christian Democratic Appeal	Lubbers I • II
Aad Kosto	Aad Kosto (born 1938)	• Immigration and Asylum • Civil Law • Judicial Reform • Youth Justice • Penitentiaries	7 November 1989	27 May 1994^{[App]}	Labour Party	Lubbers III
Elizabeth Schmitz	Elizabeth Schmitz (1938–2024)	• Immigration and Asylum • Civil Law • Youth Justice	22 August 1994	3 August 1998	Labour Party	Wim Kok (Kok I)
Job Cohen	Dr. Job Cohen (born 1947)	• Immigration and Asylum • Civil Law • Judicial Reform • Youth Justice • Penitentiaries • Debt • Gambling	3 August 1998	1 January 2001^{[App]}	Labour Party	Kok II
Ella Kalsbeek	Ella Kalsbeek (born 1955)	• Immigration and Asylum • Civil Law • Judicial Reform • Youth Justice • Penitentiaries • Debt • Gambling	1 January 2001	22 July 2002	Labour Party	Kok II
Nebahat Albayrak	Nebahat Albayrak (born 1968)	• Immigration and Asylum • Penitentiaries	22 February 2007	23 February 2010^{[Res]}	Labour Party	Balkenende IV
Fred Teeven	Fred Teeven (born 1958)	• Public; Prosecution • Civil Law • Property Law • Victims' Rights • Judicial Reform • Youth Justice • Penitentiaries • Debt • Gambling^{[Title]}	14 October 2010	10 March 2015^{[Res]}	People's Party for Freedom and Democracy	Rutte I
Fred Teeven	Fred Teeven (born 1958)	• Public; Prosecution • Civil Law • Property Law • Victims' Rights • Judicial Reform • Youth Justice • Penitentiaries • Debt • Gambling^{[Title]}	14 October 2010	10 March 2015^{[Res]}	People's Party for Freedom and Democracy	Rutte II
Klaas Dijkhoff	Dr. Klaas Dijkhoff (born 1981)	• Public; Prosecution • Civil Law • Property Law • Victims' Rights • Judicial Reform • Youth Justice • Penitentiaries • Debt • Gambling^{[Title]}	20 March 2015	4 October 2017^{[App]}	People's Party for Freedom and Democracy	Rutte II

=== State secretaries for Justice and Security ===
State Secretary for Justice and Security		Portfolio(s)	Term of office		Party	Cabinet
Mark Harbers	Mark Harbers (born 1969)	• Immigration and Asylum • Integration • Minorities^{[Title]}	26 October 2017	21 May 2019^{[Res]}	People's Party for Freedom and Democracy	Rutte III
Ankie Broekers-Knol	Ankie Broekers-Knol (born 1946)	• Immigration and Asylum • Integration • Minorities^{[Title]}	11 July 2019	10 January 2022	People's Party for Freedom and Democracy	Rutte III
Eric van der Burg	Eric van der Burg (born 1965)	• Immigration and Asylum • Integration • Minorities	10 January 2022	2 July 2024	People's Party for Freedom and Democracy	Rutte IV
	Ingrid Coenradie (born 1987)		2 July 2024	3 June 2025	Party for Freedom	Schoof
Teun Struycken	Teun Struycken (born 1969)	• Legal Protection	2 July 2024	22 August 2025	New Social Contract	Schoof
	Arno Rutte (born 1972)	• Legal Protection	5 September 2025	Incumbent	People's Party for Freedom and Democracy	Schoof

^{Resigned}
^{Designated with the diplomatic rank of Minister}
^{Appointed as Minister of Justice}
^{Appointed as Mayor of Amsterdam}
^{Appointed as Minister of Defence}

== See also ==
- Ministry of Justice and Security
- Judiciary of the Netherlands
- Criminal justice system of the Netherlands
- Public Prosecution Office
- Law enforcement in the Netherlands
- National Coordinator for Security and Counterterrorism
- Immigration and Naturalisation Service
- Custodial Institutions Agency
