= Laetitia Griffith =

Dutch politician (born 1965)

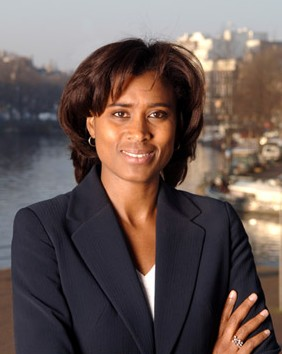
- Laetitia Griffith in 2006

Advisory Member of the Council of State
- In office 1 January 2012 – 1 January 2017
- Vice President: Herman Tjeenk Willink (2012); Piet Hein Donner (2012–2017)

Member of the House of Representatives
- In office 1 June 2006 – 17 June 2010
- In office 30 January 2003 – 3 June 2005
- Parliamentary group: People's Party for Freedom and Democracy

Personal details
- Born: Laetitia Juliëtte Griffith; 1 November 1965 (age 60) Paramaribo, Surinam
- Party: People's Party for Freedom and Democracy (from 2000)
- Spouse: Jan Naeyé (m. 1998)
- Education: Vrije Universiteit Amsterdam (Bachelor of Laws, Bachelor of Public Administration, Master of Laws, Master of Public Administration)
- Occupation: Politician · Civil servant · Jurist · Nonprofit director

Laetitia Juliëtte Griffith (born 1 November 1965) is a retired Surinamese–born Dutch politician of the People's Party for Freedom and Democracy (VVD) and jurist.

== Career ==
Born in Paramaribo, Suriname, Griffith moved to the Netherlands in 1987 to study law. She graduated in 1992 from the VU University Amsterdam. In 1993 she started work at the Ministry of Justice.

In 2000 Griffith joined the People's Party for Freedom and Democracy after being advised to do so by Minister Benk Korthals. After the fall of the First Balkenende cabinet she became a member of the House of Representatives. On 16 May 2005 she became an alderman in the Amsterdam municipal council.

On 19 May 2006 it was announced that Griffith would succeed Ayaan Hirsi Ali as parliamentarian. On 15 March 2010 she announced her retreat from politics. In 2012 she became a member of the Council of State.

== Decorations ==
Honours
Ribbon bar	Honour	Country	Date	Comment
	Knight of the Order of Orange-Nassau	Netherlands	1 January 2017	

Non-profit organization positions
Unknown	Chairwoman of the Prinses Beatrix Foundation; 2006–2014	Succeeded by Jacqueline Cramer
