= Carel Polak =

Dutch politician (1909–1981)

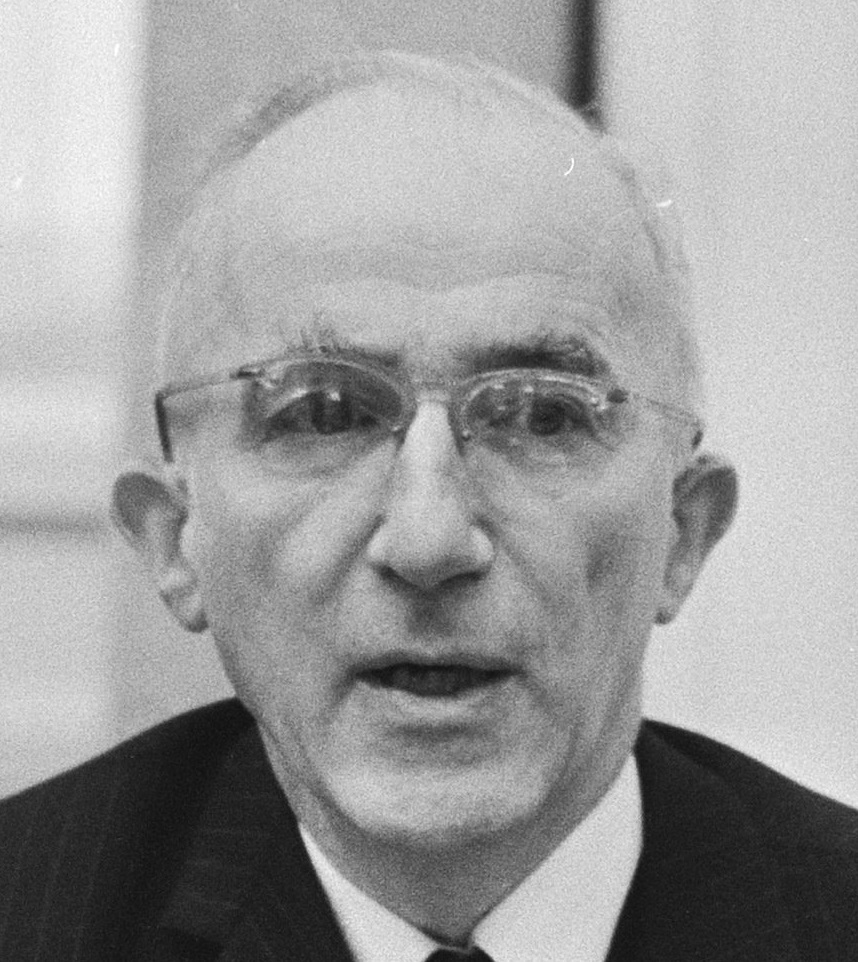
- Carel Polak in 1971

Extraordinary Member of the Council of State
- In office 1 April 1977 – 1 October 1979
- Vice President: Marinus Ruppert

Member of the Scientific Council for Government Policy
- In office 1 February 1973 – 28 February 1981
- Director: See list: Sjeng Kremers (1973–1977) Wim Schut (1977–1978) Theo Quené (1978–1981)

Member of the Senate
- In office 11 May 1971 – 29 March 1977
- Parliamentary group: People's Party for Freedom and Democracy

Minister of Justice
- In office 5 April 1967 – 6 July 1971
- Prime Minister: Piet de Jong
- Preceded by: Teun Struycken
- Succeeded by: Dries van Agt

Personal details
- Born: Carel Hendrik Frederik Polak; 2 September 1909 Rotterdam, Netherlands
- Died: 28 February 1981 (aged 71) Oegstgeest, Netherlands
- Party: People's Party for Freedom and Democracy (from 1948)
- Education: Leiden University (Bachelor of Laws, Master of Laws)
- Occupation: Politician · Jurist · Prosecutor · Researcher · Nonprofit director · Professor

Carel Hendrik Frederik Polak (2 September 1909 – 28 February 1981) was a Dutch politician of the People's Party for Freedom and Democracy (VVD) and jurist.

Polak attended the Gymnasium Haganum in The Hague from May 1922 until June 1927 and applied at the Leiden University in September 1927 majoring in Law and obtaining a Bachelor of Laws degree in June 1929 before graduating with a Master of Laws degree with honors in July 1931. Polak worked as a paralegal for the Electricity Production Company South-Netherlands from July 1931 until January 1934. Polak worked as a prosecutor for the Prosecution Service in The Hague from January 1934 until November 1946. Polak worked as a professor of Agricultural law and Agricultural economics at the Wageningen Agricultural College from November 1946 until September 1951 and a professor of Administrative law and Agricultural law at the Leiden University from September 1951 until April 1967.

After the election of 1967 Polak was appointed as Minister of Justice in the Cabinet De Jong, taking office on 5 April 1967. In December 1970 Polak announced that he wouldn't stand for the election of 1971 but wanted to run for the Senate. Polak was elected as a Member of the Senate after the Senate election of 1971, taking office on 11 May 1971. Following the cabinet formation of 1971 Polak per his own request asked not to be considered for a cabinet post in the new cabinet, the Cabinet De Jong was replaced by the Cabinet Biesheuvel I on 6 July 1971 and he continued to serve in the Senate as a frontbencher and spokesperson for the Interior, Justice and Kingdom Relations. Polak also became active in the public sector and occupied numerous seats as a nonprofit director on several boards of directors and supervisory boards (T.M.C. Asser Instituut, Organisation for Scientific Research and the Royal Academy of Arts and Sciences) and served on several state commissions and councils on behalf of the government (Custodial Institutions Agency, National Archives, Probation Agency and the Scientific Council for Government Policy). In March 1977 Polak was nominated as an Extraordinary Member of the Council of State, he resigned as a Member of the Senate on 29 March 1977 and was installed as a Member of the Council of State, serving from 1 April 1977 until 1 October 1979.

== Decorations ==
Honours
Ribbon bar	Honour	Country	Date	Comment
	Knight of the Order of the Netherlands Lion	Netherlands	30 April 1963	
	Commander of the Order of Orange-Nassau	Netherlands	17 July 1971	

Political offices
Preceded by Teun Struycken	Minister of Justice; 1967–1971	Succeeded by Dries van Agt
