= Ernst Hirsch Ballin =

Dutch politician

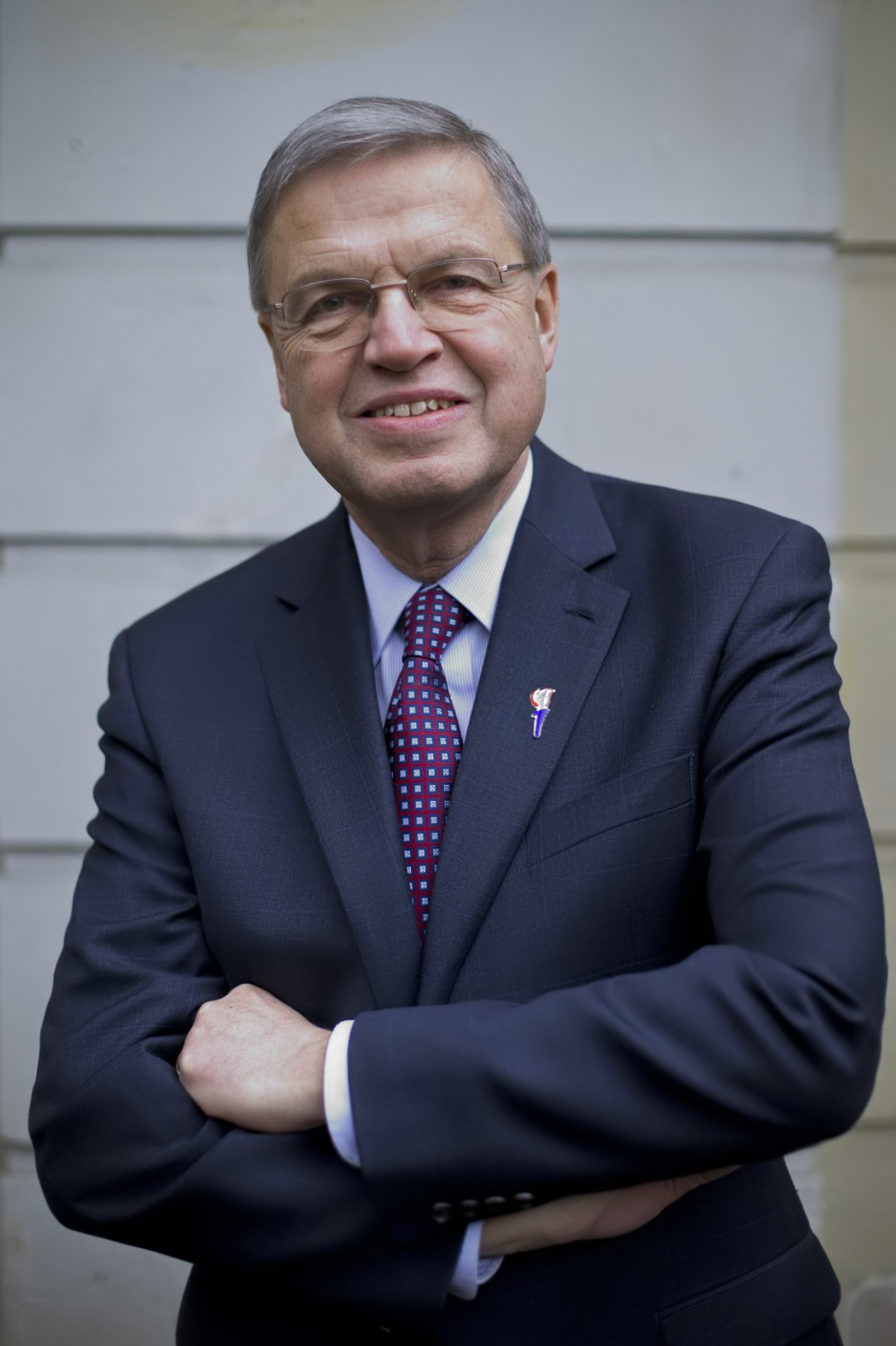
- Hirsch Ballin in 2013

Member of the Scientific Council for Government Policy
- In office 1 July 2014 – 1 July 2024
- Director: See list: André Knottnerus (2014–2017) Corien Prins (2017–2019)

Minister of the Interior and Kingdom Relations
- In office 23 February 2010 – 14 October 2010
- Prime Minister: Jan Peter Balkenende
- Preceded by: Guusje Ter Horst
- Succeeded by: Piet Hein Donner

Member of the Council of State
- In office 1 November 2000 – 22 September 2006
- Vice President: Herman Tjeenk Willink

Member of the Senate
- In office 13 June 1995 – 1 November 2000
- Parliamentary group: Christian Democratic Appeal

Member of the House of Representatives
- In office 17 May 1994 – 1 June 1995
- Parliamentary group: Christian Democratic Appeal

Minister of the Interior
- In office 10 January 1994 – 18 January 1994; Ad interim
- Prime Minister: Ruud Lubbers
- Preceded by: Ien Dales
- Succeeded by: Ed van Thijn

Minister for Netherlands Antilles and Aruba Affairs
- In office 14 November 1989 – 27 May 1994
- Prime Minister: Ruud Lubbers
- Preceded by: Ruud Lubbers (Ad interim)
- Succeeded by: Ruud Lubbers

Minister of Justice
- In office 22 September 2006 – 14 October 2010
- Prime Minister: Jan Peter Balkenende
- Preceded by: Rita Verdonk (Ad interim)
- Succeeded by: Ivo Opstelten as Minister of Security and Justice
- In office 7 November 1989 – 27 May 1994
- Prime Minister: Ruud Lubbers
- Preceded by: Frits Korthals Altes
- Succeeded by: Aad Kosto

Personal details
- Born: Ernst Maurits Henricus Hirsch; 15 December 1950 (age 75) Amsterdam, Netherlands
- Party: Christian Democratic Appeal (from 1982)
- Parent: Ernst Denny Hirsch Ballin (father)
- Occupation: Politician · civil servant · jurist · author · professor

Academic background
- Education: Amsterdams Lyceum
- Alma mater: University of Amsterdam (LLM, PhD)
- Thesis: Publiekrecht en beleid : fundamentele kwesties rondom het functioneren van de Wetenschappelĳke Raad voor het Regeringsbeleid (1979)
- Doctoral advisor: Luuk Prakke

Academic work
- Discipline: Constitutional law
- Institutions: Tilburg University; University of Amsterdam
- Doctoral students: Alex Brenninkmeijer

Ernst Maurits Henricus Hirsch Ballin (born 15 December 1950) is a retired Dutch politician of the Christian Democratic Appeal (CDA) party and jurist.

After the election of 1989 Hirsch Ballin was appointed as Minister of Justice in the Cabinet Lubbers III, taking office on 7 November 1989. Hirsch Ballin was also appointed as Minister for Netherlands Antilles and Aruba Affairs, taking office on 14 November 1989. Hirsch Ballin served as acting Minister of the Interior from 10 January 1994 until 18 January 1994 following the death of Ien Dales. Hirsch Ballin was elected as a Member of the House of Representatives after the election of 1994, taking office on 17 May 1994. On 27 May 1994, Hirsch Ballin and Minister of the Interior Ed van Thijn resigned following the conclusions of a parliamentary inquiry report into illegal interrogation techniques used by the police. Hirsch Ballin also served again as a professor of International law at the Tilburg University from 1 July 1994 until 22 September 2006 and also as a professor of Jurisprudence at the Tilburg University from 1 September 1996 until 22 September 2006. Hirsch Ballin was elected as a Member of the Senate after the Senate election of 1995, he resigned as a Member of the House of Representatives on 1 June 1995 and was installed as a Member of the Senate, taking office on 13 June 1995. In October 2000 Hirsch Ballin was nominated as Member of the Council of State, he resigned as a Member of the Senate the same day he was installed as a Member of the Council of State, taking office on 1 November 2000. Hirsch Ballin was appointed again as Minister of Justice in the Cabinet Balkenende III following the resignation of Piet Hein Donner, taking office on 22 September 2006. Shortly thereafter Hirsch Ballin announced that he would not stand for the election of 2006. Following the cabinet formation of 2006 Hirsch Ballin continued as Minister of Justice in the Cabinet Balkenende IV, taking office on 22 February 2007. The Cabinet Balkenende IV fell on 20 February 2010 after tensions in the coalition over the extension of the Dutch involvement in the Task Force Urozgan of the International Security Assistance Force (ISAF) in Afghanistan and continued to serve in a demissionary capacity with Hirsch Ballin continuing as Minister of Justice and also took over as Minister of the Interior and Kingdom Relations, taking office on 23 February 2010. In April 2010 Hirsch Ballin announced that he would not stand for the election of 2010. Following the cabinet formation of 2010 Hirsch Ballin was not giving a cabinet post in the new cabinet, the Cabinet Balkenende IV was replaced by the Cabinet Rutte I on 14 October 2010.

Hirsch Ballin semi-retired from active politics and became active in the public sector and occupied numerous seats as a nonprofit director on several boards of directors and supervisory boards (Institute for Multiparty Democracy, European Christian Political Foundation, The Hague Institute for Global Justice, Carnegie Foundation, T.M.C. Asser Instituut, National Archives, Cordaid and the Anne Frank Foundation) and served on several state commissions and councils on behalf of the government (Scientific Council for Government Policy, the Dutch Probation Agency and Public Pension Funds APB) and as an advocate and lobbyist for human rights, anti-war movement, social justice, and democracy. Hirsch Ballin also returned as a distinguished professor of constitutional law and European law at the Tilburg University since 1 April 2011 and as a distinguished professor of human rights at the University of Amsterdam since 1 May 2011. Hirsch Ballin is also a prolific author, having written more than sixty books since 1979 about politics, democracy, and law.

Hirsch Ballin is known for his abilities as a manager and policy wonk. Hirsch Ballin continues to comment on political affairs as of 2026 and holds the distinction as the longest-serving Minister of Justice with 8 years, 223 days.

== Biography ==
=== Early life ===
Hirsch Ballin was born to a Jewish father Prof. Dr. Ernst Danny Hirsch Ballin, and a Roman Catholic mother. After completing his secondary education, he studied law at the University of Amsterdam and became a practicing Catholic.

He graduated in 1974, and he received a Master of Laws degree. He received a Doctor of Philosophy degree in 1979 for his dissertation on public law and policy, which focussed on fundamental issues surrounding the work of the Advisory Council on Government Policy (WRR).

Hirsch Ballin was a research assistant in constitutional law at the University of Amsterdam from 1974 to 1977. He was subsequently employed as a legal officer at the Ministry of Justice. In 1981 he was appointed professor of constitutional and administrative law at Tilburg University.

=== Politics ===
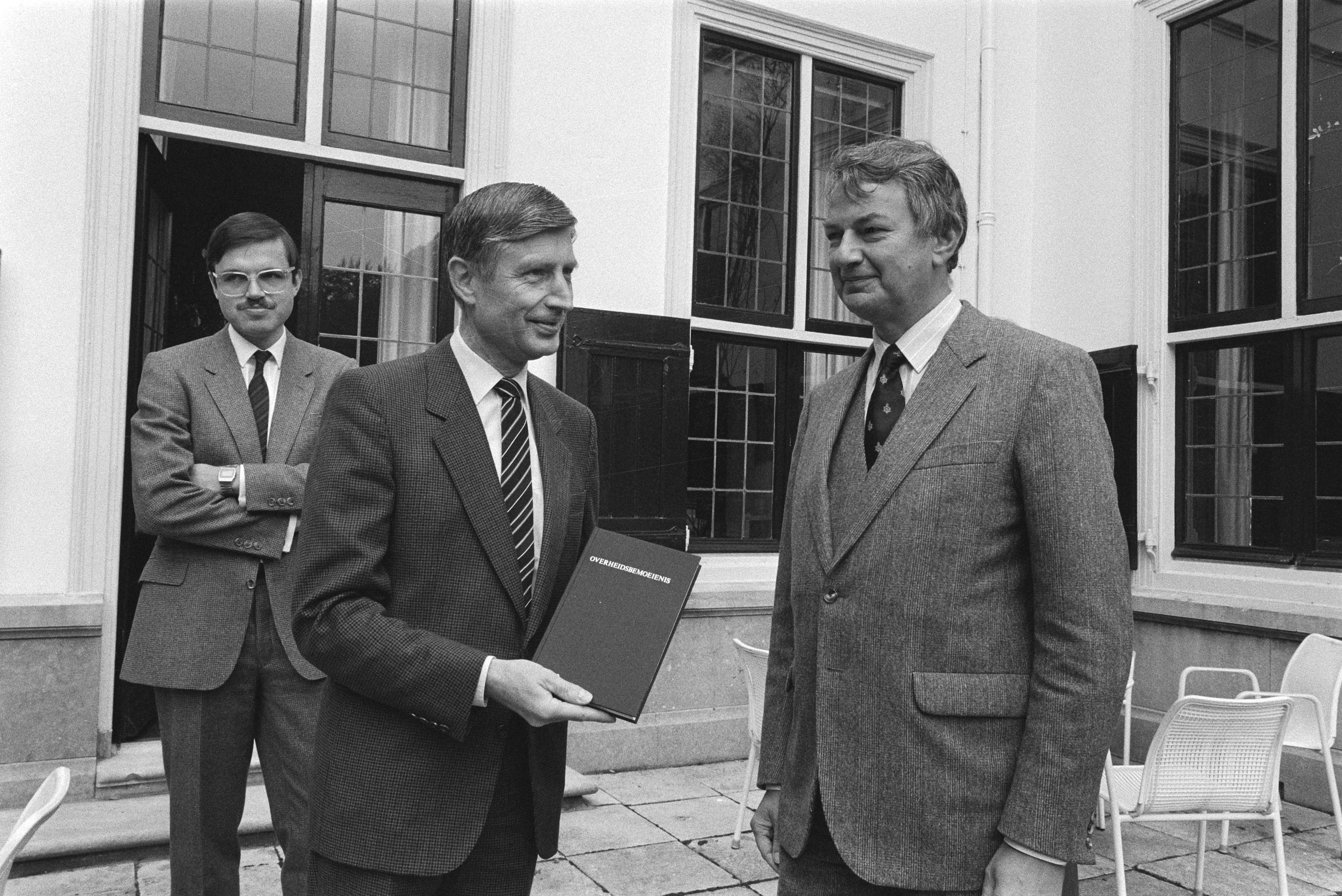
Ernst Hirsch Ballin, Prime Minister Dries van Agt and professor Gerard van Veldhoven during a meeting at the Catshuis on 20 October 1982.

From 7 November 1989 to 27 May 1994 Hirsch Ballin served as Minister of Justice and Minister for Suriname and Netherlands Antilles Affairs in the Cabinet Lubbers III. In 1994 he offered his resignation, after turmoil about the Dutch Criminal Investigation Department.

After the Cabinet Kok I with a coalition of the Dutch Labour Party, People's Party for Freedom and Democracy and Democrats 66 came to power the Christian Democratic Appeal was pushed to the opposition and Hirsch Ballin became a Member of the House of Representatives a post he held until 1995.

During this period he was also professor of legislative issues at the Tilburg University. In 1995 he was appointed professor of international law at the same university and later became Member of the Senate. He was elected as a member of the Royal Netherlands Academy of Arts and Sciences in 2005. In 2000 Hirsch Ballin was appointed to the Dutch Council of State and he resigned as a Member of the Senate.

Hirsch Ballin has held numerous other positions, among them government commissioner for the review of legislation, member of the Board of the Netherlands Atlantic Association, member of Committee 2004 (for the relationship between the Netherlands, the Netherlands Antilles and Aruba) and deputy justice on the Central Appeals Tribunal and the Administrative Court for Trade and Industry. He has been editor of the Dutch administrative law journal "Nederlands Tijdschrift voor Bestuursrecht" and the book series European and International Law.

On 23 May 2008, satirical cartoonist Gregorius Nekschot was arrested which caused (inter)national controversy. Hirsch Ballin wanted to pass a bill on blasphemy, but failed. He was accused of causing the cartoonist to be brought to court for blasphemy to get a verdict to bypass the parliament.

Hirsch Ballin is also an active member of the Justice Leadership Initiative.

=== Family ===
Ernst Hirsch Ballin is married; he and his wife have two children.

== Decorations ==
Honours
Ribbon bar	Honour	Country	Date	Comment
	Knight of the Order of the Holy Sepulchre	Holy See	10 December 1990	
	Knight of the Order of the Netherlands Lion	Netherlands	8 October 1994	
	Grand Officer of the Order of Leopold II	Belgium	21 March 2008	
	Officer of the Legion of Honour	France	30 October 2014	
	Grand Officer of the Order of Orange-Nassau	Netherlands	1 April 2019	Elevated from Officer (3 December 2010)

Political offices
Preceded by Frits Korthals Altes	Minister of Justice; 1989–1994; 2006–2010	Succeeded by Aad Kosto
Preceded by Rita Verdonk; Ad interim	Minister of Justice; 1989–1994; 2006–2010	Succeeded by Ivo Opstelten as Minister of Security and Justice
Preceded by Ruud Lubbers; Ad interim	Minister for Suriname and Netherlands Antilles Affairs; 1989–1994	Succeeded by Ruud Lubbers
Preceded by Ien Dales	Minister of the Interior; Ad interim 1994	Succeeded by Ed van Thijn
Preceded by Guusje Ter Horst	Minister of the Interior and Kingdom Relations; 2010	Succeeded by Piet Hein Donner
Non-profit organization positions
Preceded by Sijbolt Noorda	President of the T.M.C. Asser Instituut; 2012–present	Incumbent
Preceded by Frans Slangen	Chairman of the Supervisory board of Cordaid; 2013–2018	Succeeded by Ton Heerts
Preceded by Wim Kok	Chairman of the Supervisory board of the Anne Frank Foundation; 2017–present	Incumbent
