= Aad Kosto =

Dutch politician (born 1938)

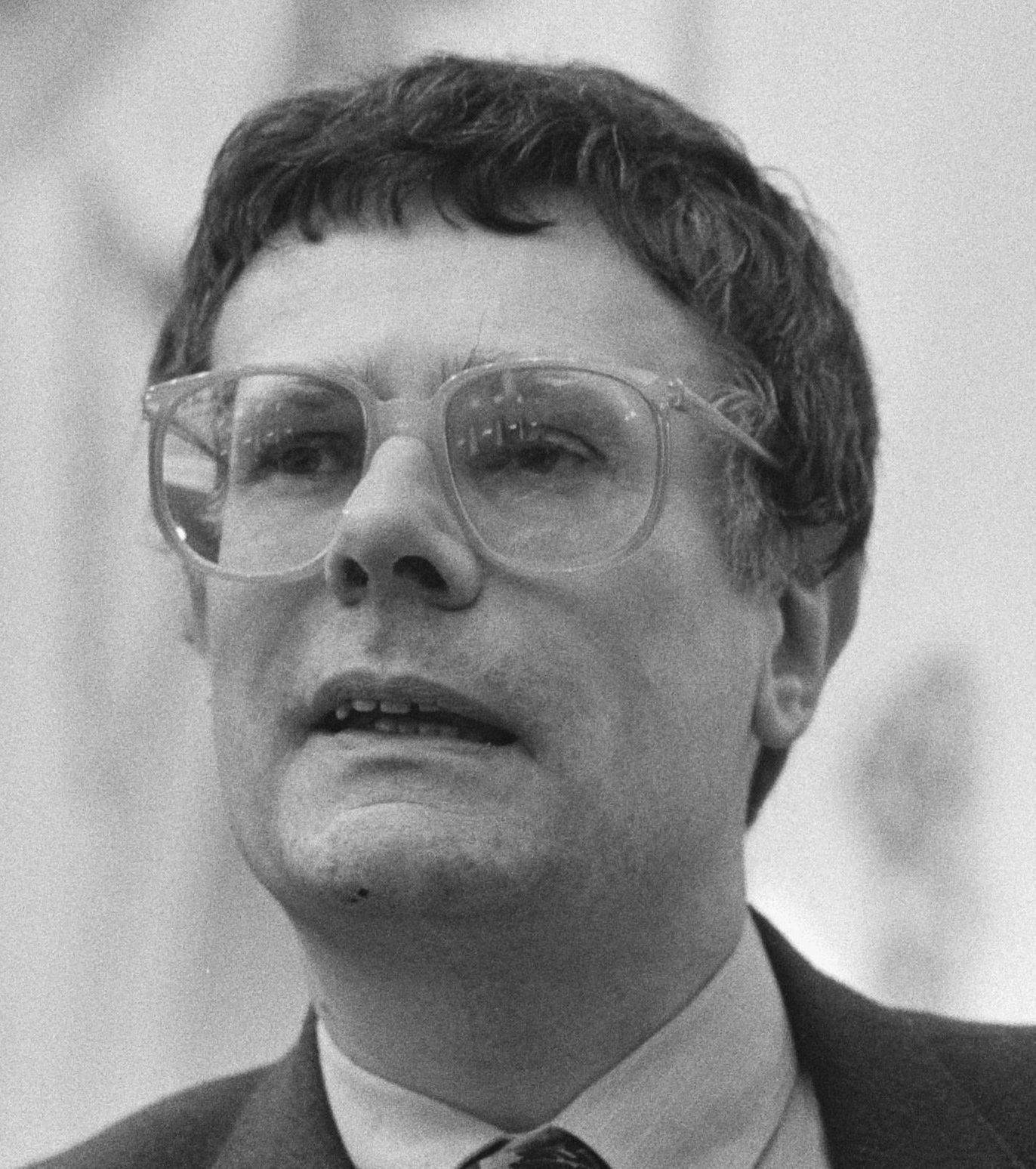
- Aad Kosto in 1985

Member of the Council of State
- In office 12 September 1994 – 1 February 2008
- Vice President: Willem Scholten (1994–1997); Herman Tjeenk Willink (1997–2008)

Minister of Justice
- In office 27 May 1994 – 22 August 1994
- Prime Minister: Ruud Lubbers
- Preceded by: Ernst Hirsch Ballin
- Succeeded by: Winnie Sorgdrager

State Secretary for Justice
- In office 7 November 1989 – 27 May 1994
- Prime Minister: Ruud Lubbers
- Preceded by: Virginie Korte-van Hemel
- Succeeded by: Elizabeth Schmitz

Member of the House of Representatives
- In office 17 May 1994 – 12 September 1994
- In office 7 December 1972 – 7 November 1989
- Parliamentary group: Labour Party

Personal details
- Born: Arie Kosto; 9 January 1938 (age 88) Oegstgeest, Netherlands
- Party: Labour Party (from 1958)
- Spouses: Anneke Reuvekamp (m. 1969; died 2005) Margot Prins (m. 2008)
- Children: 2 daughters (first marriage)
- Education: University of Amsterdam (Bachelor of Theology, Bachelor of Laws, Master of Laws)
- Occupation: Politician · Civil servant · Jurist · Researcher · Nonprofit director · Lobbyist · Television producer · Editor · Screenwriter · Author

Military service
- Allegiance: Netherlands
- Branch/service: Royal Netherlands Army
- Years of service: 1958–1960 (Conscription); 1960–1968 (Reserve)
- Rank: Private first class
- Unit: Garderegiment Fuseliers Prinses Irene
- Battles/wars: Cold War

Arie "Aad" Kosto (born 9 January 1938) is a retired Dutch politician of the Labour Party (PvdA) and jurist.

Kosto attended the Gymnasium Leiden from April 1950 until June 1958 where he majored in Theology. Kosto worked as student researcher at the University of Amsterdam from June 1960 until July 1962. Kosto worked as a television producer, editor and screenwriter for the VARA from July 1962 until December 1972. Kosto was elected as a Member of the House of Representatives after the election of 1972, taking office on 7 December 1972. After the election of 1989 Kosto was appointed as State Secretary for Justice in the Cabinet Lubbers III, taking office on 7 November 1989. On 13 November 1991 Kosto was targeted by the radical activist group Revolutionary Anti-Racist Action (RaRa) who destroyed his house in Grootschermer with a bomb. Kosto was appointed as Minister of Justice following the resignation of Ernst Hirsch Ballin, taking office on 27 May 1994. After the election of 1994 Kosto returned as a Member of the House of Representatives, taking office on 17 May 1994. Following the cabinet formation of 1994 Kosto was not giving a cabinet post in the new cabinet and the Cabinet Lubbers III was replaced by the Cabinet Kok I on 22 August 1994 and continued to serve as a frontbencher.

In August 1994 Kosto was nominated as a Member of the Council of State, he resigned as a Member of the House of Representatives the day he was installed as a Member of the Council of State, serving from 12 September 1994 until 1 February 2008.

Kosto retired from active politic and became active in the public sector and occupied numerous seats as a nonprofit director on several boards of directors and supervisory boards (Stichting Pensioenfonds Zorg en Welzijn, Copyright and Patent association, Institute for Multiparty Democracy) and served on several state commissions and councils on behalf of the government (Probation Agency and the Custodial Institutions Agency).

== Decorations ==
Honours
| Ribbon bar | Honour | Country | Date | Comment |
| | Officer of the Order of Leopold II | Belgium | 12 April 1992 | |
| | Knight of the Order of the Netherlands Lion | Netherlands | 8 October 1994 | |
| | Commander of the Order of Orange-Nassau | Netherlands | 1 February 2008 | |

Political offices
| Preceded by Virginie Korte-van Hemel | State Secretary for Justice; 1989–1994 | Succeeded by Elizabeth Schmitz |
| Preceded by Ernst Hirsch Ballin | Minister of Justice; 1994 | Succeeded by Winnie Sorgdrager |
Business positions
| Preceded by Office established | Chairman of the Copyright and Patent association 2008–2012 | Succeeded by Job Cohen |
