= Winnie Sorgdrager =

Dutch politician

Her Excellency Winnie Sorgdrager
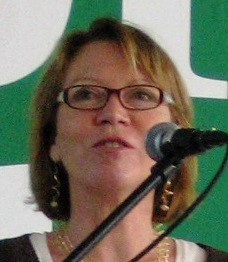
- Sorgdrager in 2009

Member of the Council of State
- In office 1 January 2006 – 1 May 2018
- Vice President: Herman Tjeenk Willink (2006–2012); Piet Hein Donner (2012–2018)

Member of the Senate
- In office 8 June 1999 – 1 October 1999
- Parliamentary group: Democrats 66

Minister of Justice
- In office 22 August 1994 – 3 August 1998
- Prime Minister: Wim Kok
- Preceded by: Aad Kosto
- Succeeded by: Benk Korthals

Personal details
- Born: Winnifred Sorgdrager; 6 April 1948 (age 78) The Hague, Netherlands
- Party: Democrats 66 (from 1994)
- Other political affiliations: People's Party for Freedom and Democracy (1973–1983); Democrats 66 (1968–1971)
- Education: Leiden University (Bachelor of Medical Sciences; University of Groningen (Bachelor of Laws, Master of Laws)
- Occupation: Politician · Civil servant · Jurist · Prosecutor · Judge · Researcher · Academic administrator · Nonprofit director · Author

Winnifred "Winnie" Sorgdrager (born 6 April 1948) is a retired Dutch politician of the Democrats 66 (D66) party and jurist. She was granted the honorary title of Minister of State on 22 June 2018.

== Biography ==
Sorgdrager studied law at the University of Groningen. Sorgdrager worked as researcher at the University of Twente from July 1971 until January 1979. Sorgdrager worked as a prosecutor for the Prosecution Service in Almelo from January 1979 until May 1986 and as solicitor general for the Prosecution Service in Arnhem from May 1986 until January 1991. Sorgdrager worked as Attorney General of the Courts of Appeal of Arnhem from January 1991 until January 1994 and as Attorney General of the Courts of Appeal of The Hague from January 1994 until 22 August 1994.

After the election of 1994, Sorgdrager was appointed Minister of Justice in the Cabinet Kok I, taking office on 22 August 1994. In April 1998, Sorgdrager announced that she would not stand for the election of 1998. Following the cabinet formation of 1998, Sorgdrager was not given a cabinet post in the new cabinet, The Cabinet Kok I was replaced by the Cabinet Kok II on 3 August 1998. In September 1998, Sorgdrager was a candidate as the next National Ombudsman, but had to retract her candidacy following criticism from the Prosecution Service. Sorgdrager was elected as a Member of the Senate after the Senate election of 1999, serving from 8 June 1999 until her resignation on 1 October 1999. In December 2005, Sorgdrager was nominated as a Member of the Council of State, serving from 1 January 2006 until 1 May 2018.

Sorgdrager is also a member of the Supervisory Board of the Leiden University Medical Center, a commissioner for the association for the preservation of historic houses of The Netherlands, Vereniging Hendrick de Keyser, and a member of the board of the Arbo Unie. She became an ethics counselor to the cabinet of the Netherlands in March 2024.

Sorgdrager has two sons, Ernest and Daniel, from her past marriage to Jan Willem Loot. Their marriage ended in divorce in 1977.

== Decorations ==
Honours
Ribbon bar	Honour	Country	Date	Comment
	Officer of the Order of Orange-Nassau	Netherlands	30 October 1998	
	Commander of the Order of the Netherlands Lion	Netherlands	1 May 2018	
Honorific Titles
Ribbon bar	Honour	Country	Date	Comment
	Minister of State	Netherlands	22 June 2018	Style of Excellency

Political offices
Preceded by Aad Kosto	Minister of Justice; 1994–1998	Succeeded by Benk Korthals
Civic offices
Preceded by Jos van Kemenade	Chairwoman of the Supervisory board of the Raad voor Cultuur; 2000–2006	Succeeded by Els Swaab
