= Anthony Modderman =

Dutch politician

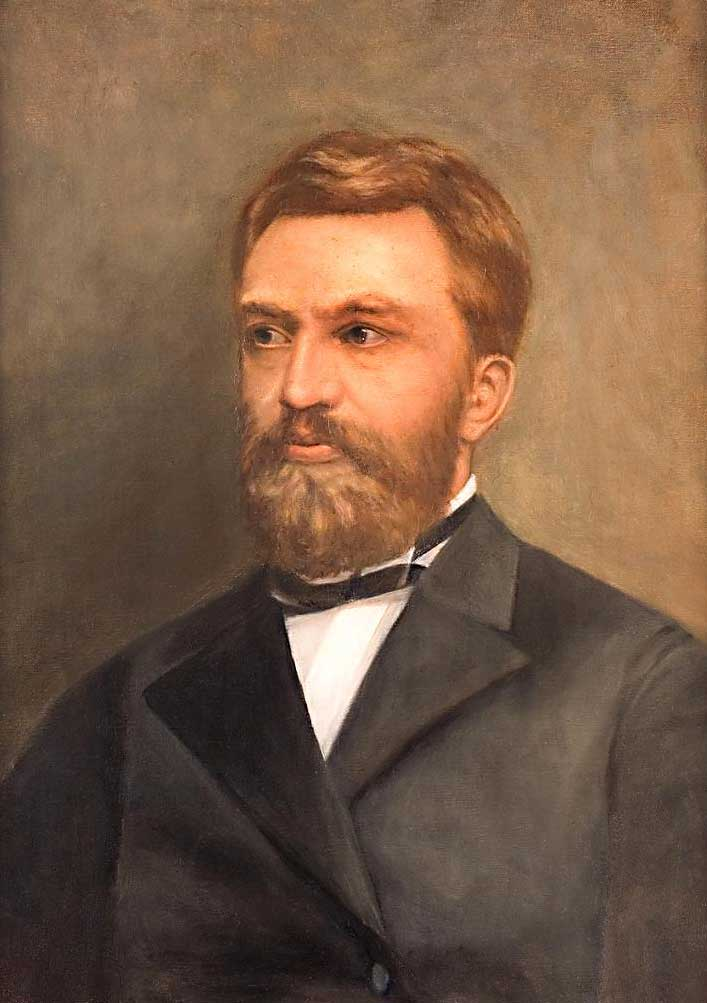
Portrait by Odilia Theodora Suffrida de Vos tot Nederveen Cappel.

Anthony Ewoud Jan Modderman (27 September 1838 – 7 August 1885) was a Dutch liberal politician.

Modderman was born in Winschoten, to Hendrik Jacob Herman Modderman and Adriana Sibylla Catharina Emmen. He studied Roman and Contemporary Law in Leiden, graduating in 1863, after which he settled in The Hague to become a lawyer. Modderman was appointed as Minister of Justice on 20 August 1879. As minister, he successfully opposed the reintroduction of the death penalty in 1881. He left office on 23 April 1883 and was given the honorary title of Minister of State six days later. Modderman died in The Hague.
