= Bert Haars =

Dutch jurist and politician (1913-1997)

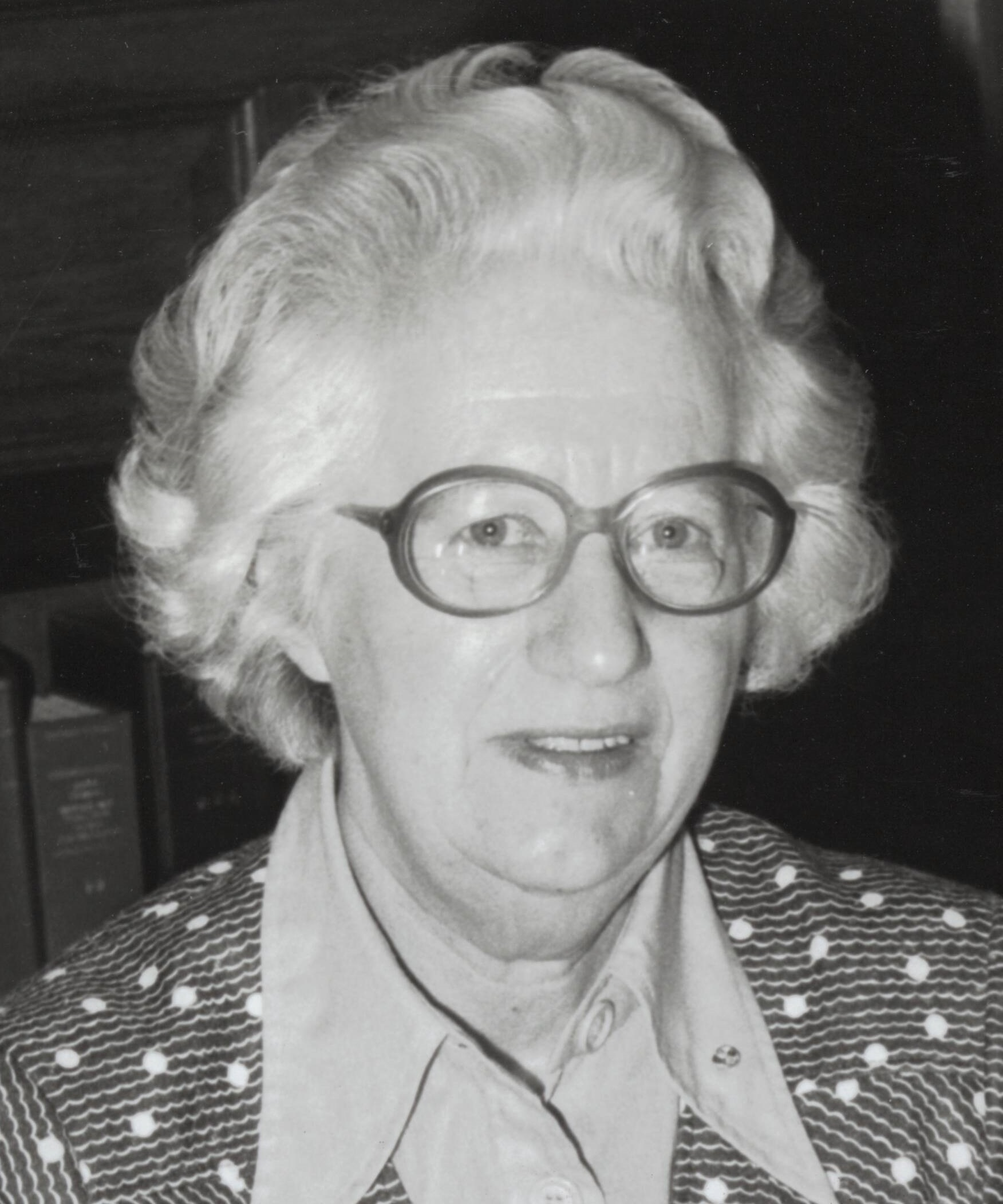
- Haars in 1977

Mayor of Kockengen
- In office 1984–1989
- Preceded by: J. Berentschot
- Succeeded by: –

State Secretary for Justice
- In office 28 December 1977 – 11 September 1981
- Prime Minister: Dries van Agt
- Minister: Job de Ruiter
- Preceded by: Henk Zeevalking
- Succeeded by: Michiel Scheltema

Member of the House of Representatives
- In office 18 April 1967 – 10 May 1971

Personal details
- Born: Elberta Alijda Haars; 1 September 1913 Lochem, Netherlands
- Died: 3 June 1997 (aged 83) Breukelen, Netherlands
- Party: Christian Democratic Appeal (from 1980)
- Other political affiliations: Christian Historical Union (until 1980)

Elberta Alijda “Bert” Haars (1 September 1913 – 3 June 1997) was a Dutch jurist and politician of the defunct Christian Historical Union (CHU) which was merged into the Christian Democratic Appeal (CDA) party in 1980. She served as a member of the House of Representatives and later as State Secretary for Justice in the first Van Agt cabinet.

== Early life ==
Haars was born in Lochem in 1913. She completed secondary education in Amersfoort and studied law at Utrecht University, graduating in 1937. Haars subsequently settled in Breukelen, where she worked as a lawyer and legal procurator. During the Second World War, she was involved in resistance activities connected to the Vechtstreek intelligence service.

== Political career ==
After the war, Haars became active in the Christian Historical Union. She served on the municipal council of Breukelen from 1949 and was a member of the Provincial States of Utrecht from 1950. In 1967 she entered the House of Representatives, becoming the second woman in the CHU parliamentary group. Her parliamentary work focused on justice, internal affairs and housing policy.

In 1972 Haars left the House to join the Provincial executive of Utrecht, serving until 1974, and later became vice-chair of the CHU. In 1977 she was appointed State Secretary for Justice in the first Van Agt cabinet.

== State Secretary for Justice ==
As State Secretary, Haars was responsible for immigration policy during a period of growing public sensitivity. Her strict and legalistic approach attracted strong criticism and earned her nicknames like 'the iceberg' and 'the armored chicken'. Although her policies largely continued those of previous governments, her direct and sometimes clumsy style contributed to a public image of hardness and political inflexibility. Haars herself rejected this image, arguing that she was carrying out difficult government policy and that personal attacks were uncalled for. However, her remark "I already have such a full country" did not help this perception.

== Later life and death ==
After leaving national politics, Haars held many chairmanships of social organizations and board positions in business. In 1984 she was appointed acting mayor of Kockengen, a position she held for more than four years. She never married. Haars died in Breukelen in 1997 and was buried in Leusden.

== Decorations ==
Honours
| Ribbon bar | Honour | Country | Date | Comment |
|---|---|---|---|---|
| | Knight of the Order of the Netherlands Lion | Netherlands | 26 oktober 1981 | |
| | Officer of the Order of Orange-Nassau | Netherlands | | |

Political offices
| Preceded by Henk Zeevalking | State Secretary for Justice; 1977–1981 | Succeeded by Michiel Scheltema |
| Preceded by J. Berentschot | Mayor of Kockengen; 1984–1989 | Succeeded by – |
