= Virginie Korte-van Hemel =

Dutch politician (1929–2014)

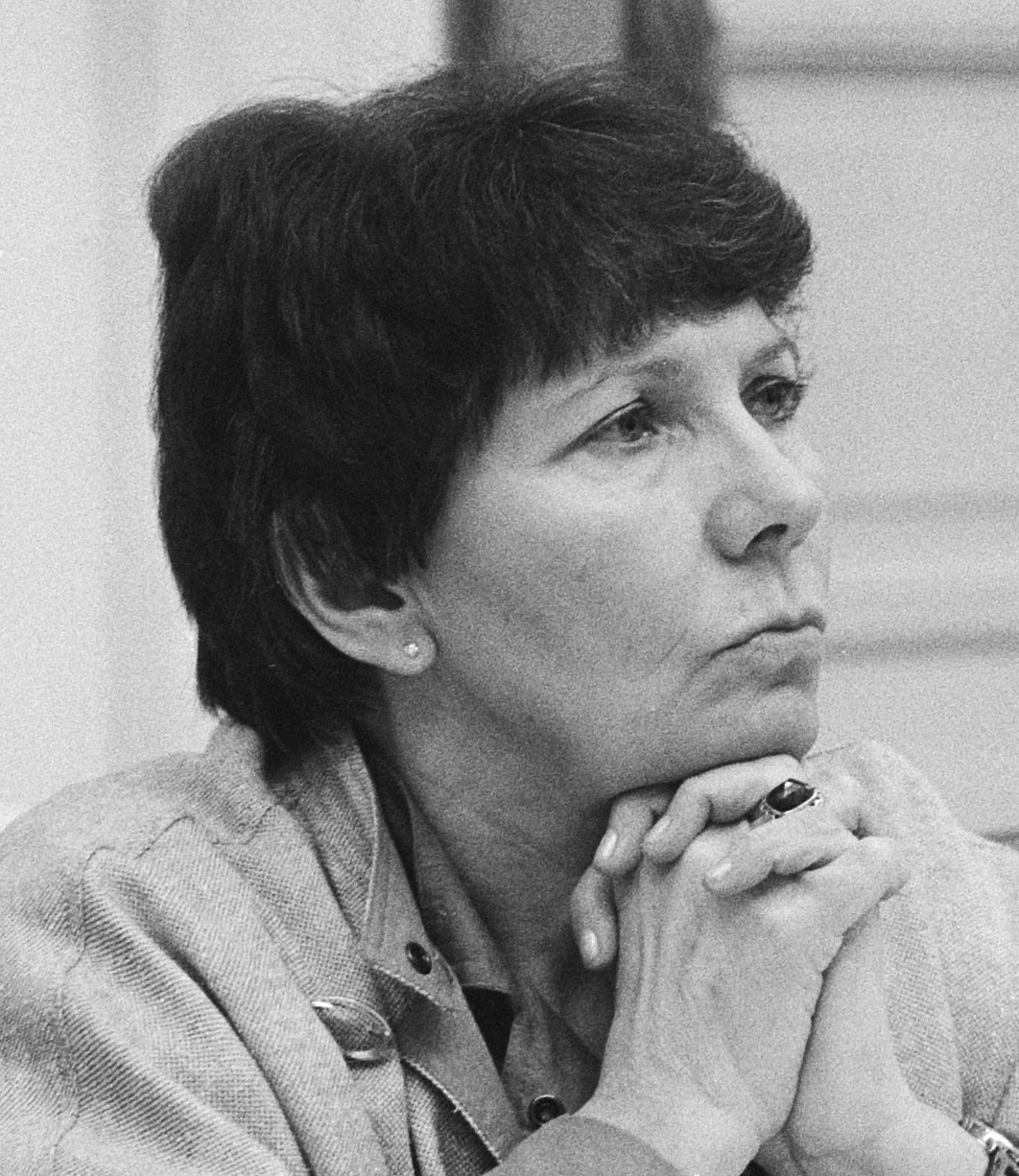
- Virginie Korte-van Hemel in 1984

Extraordinary Member of the Council of State
- In office 1 November 1992 – 1 June 1999
- Vice President: Willem Scholten (1992–1997); Herman Tjeenk Willink (1997–1999)

Member of the Senate
- In office 11 June 1991 – 1 November 1992

State Secretary for Justice
- In office 8 November 1982 – 7 November 1989
- Prime Minister: Ruud Lubbers
- Preceded by: Michiel Scheltema
- Succeeded by: Aad Kosto

Member of the House of Representatives
- In office 3 June 1986 – 14 July 1986
- In office 9 September 1981 – 16 September 1982
- In office 15 September 1977 – 10 June 1981

Personal details
- Born: Virginie Norbertina Maria van Hemel; 8 May 1929 Bergen op Zoom, Netherlands
- Died: 3 April 2014 (aged 84) Bussum, Netherlands
- Party: Christian Democratic Appeal (from 1980)
- Other political affiliations: Catholic People's Party (until 1980)
- Spouse: Herman Korte (m. 1958; died 2009)
- Children: 4 children
- Education: Utrecht University (Bachelor of Laws, Master of Laws)
- Occupation: Politician · Jurist · Lawyer · Prosecutor · Researcher · Nonprofit director

Virginie Norbertina Maria Korte-van Hemel (8 May 1929 – 3 April 2014) was a Dutch politician of the Catholic People's Party (KVP) and jurist.

== Biography ==
Korte-van Hemel worked as a student researcher at Utrecht University from June 1953 until July 1955 and as a lawyer and prosecutor in Bussum from August 1955 until September 1977. Korte-van Hemel served on the municipal council of Bussum from April 1966 until September 1977 and served as an Alderperson in Bussum from September 1970 until September 1974. Korte-van Hemel became a member of the House of Representatives after Fons van der Stee was appointed as Minister of Agriculture and Fisheries and Minister for Netherlands Antilles Affairs in the Van Agt–Wiegel cabinet following the 1977 general election, serving from 15 September 1977 until 10 June 1981. Korte-van Hemel returned to the House of Representatives after Job de Ruiter was appointed as Minister of Justice in the Van Agt II cabinet following the 1981 general election, serving from 9 September 1981 until 16 September 1982. After the 1982 general election, Korte-van Hemel was appointed as State Secretary for Justice in the Lubbers I cabinet, taking office on 8 November 1982. After the 1982 general election, Korte-van Hemel returned to the House of Representatives, taking office on 3 June 1986. After the cabinet formation of 1986, Korte-van Hemel continued as State Secretary for Justice in the Lubbers II cabinet, taking office on 14 July 1986. In February 1989 Korte-van Hemel announced that she would not stand for the 1989 general election. Following the cabinet formation of 1989 Korte-van Hemel was not giving a cabinet post in the new cabinet, and left office upon the installation of the Lubbers III cabinet on 7 November 1989.

Korte-van Hemel remained in active politics, she elected to the Senate after the 1991 Senate election, taking office on 11 June 1991. In October 1992 Korte-van Hemel was nominated as an Extraordinary Member of the Council of State, she resigned from the Senate the day she was installed as an Extraordinary Member of the Council of State, serving from 1 November 1992 until 1 June 1999.

== Decorations ==
Honours
Ribbon bar	Honour	Country	Date	Comment
	Officer of the Order of Leopold II	Belgium	2 February 1988	
	Commander of the Order of Orange-Nassau	Netherlands	20 November 1989	
	Knight of the Order of the Holy Sepulchre	Holy See	30 July 1990	

Political offices
Preceded by Michiel Scheltema	State Secretary for Justice; 1982–1989	Succeeded by Aad Kosto
