= Teun Struycken (born 1906) =

Dutch jurist and politician

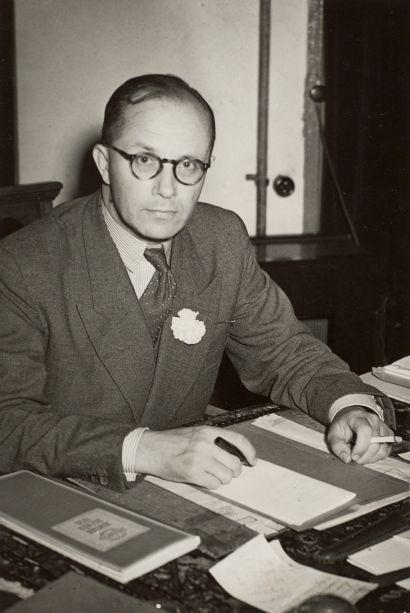
- Teun Struycken in 1950

Member of the Council of State
- In office 16 April 1967 – 1 December 1977
- Vice President: Louis Beel (1967–1972); Marinus Ruppert (1972–1977)
- In office 1 November 1959 – 22 November 1966
- Vice President: Louis Beel

Deputy Prime Minister of the Netherlands
- In office 29 October 1956 – 19 May 1959
- Prime Minister: Willem Drees (1956–1958); Louis Beel (1958–1959)
- Preceded by: Louis Beel
- Succeeded by: Henk Korthals

Minister of the Interior, Property and Public Sector Organisations
- In office 29 October 1956 – 19 May 1959
- Prime Minister: Willem Drees (1956–1958); Louis Beel (1958–1959)
- Preceded by: Ko Suurhoff (ad interim) as Minister of the Interior
- Succeeded by: Edzo Toxopeus as Minister of the Interior

Governor of the Netherlands Antilles
- In office 30 March 1951 – 29 October 1956
- Monarch: Juliana
- Preceded by: Leonard Peters
- Succeeded by: Frans van der Valk

Minister of Justice
- In office 22 November 1966 – 5 April 1967
- Prime Minister: Jelle Zijlstra
- Preceded by: Ivo Samkalden
- Succeeded by: Carel Polak
- In office 22 December 1958 – 19 May 1959
- Prime Minister: Louis Beel
- Preceded by: Ivo Samkalden
- Succeeded by: Albert Beerman
- In office 10 July 1950 – 15 March 1951
- Prime Minister: Willem Drees
- Preceded by: Johan van Maarseveen (ad interim)
- Succeeded by: Hendrik Mulderije

Personal details
- Born: Antoon Arnold Marie Struycken; 27 December 1906 Breda, Netherlands
- Died: 1 December 1977 (aged 70) The Hague, Netherlands
- Party: Catholic People's Party (from 1945)
- Other political affiliations: Roman Catholic State Party (until 1945)
- Spouse: Matthea Feldbrugge (m. 1935)
- Children: 6 sons and 2 daughters
- Education: Radboud University Nijmegen (LL.B, LL.M)
- Occupation: Politician · Civil servant · Jurist · Lawyer · Nonprofit director

Antoon Arnold Marie "Teun" Struycken (27 December 1906 – 1 December 1977) was a Dutch jurist and politician, co-founder of the Catholic People's Party (KVP).

Struycken worked as a lawyer in Breda from 1932 until 1939 and served as an Alderman in Breda from 1939 until 1941. Struycken worked as a jurist for the Algemene Kunstzijde Unie from 1941 until 1942. On 4 May 1942 Struycken was arrested and detained in Kamp Sint-Michielsgestel and was released on 21 January 1944. Following the end of World War II Struycken returned as Alderman in Breda from 1945 until 1950. Struycken was appointed as Minister of Justice in the Drees–Van Schaik cabinet following the resignation of René Wijers, taking office on 10 July 1950. The Drees–Van Schaik cabinet fell on 24 January 1951 and continued to serve in a demissionary capacity. Following the cabinet formation of 1951, after which the Drees–Van Schaik cabinet was replaced by the Drees I cabinet on 15 March, Struycken was not given a ministerial post in the new cabinet. In March 1951 Struycken was appointed Governor of the Netherlands Antilles, taking office on 30 March 1951. After the 1956 general election Struycken was appointed as Deputy Prime Minister and Minister of the Interior, Property and Public Sector Organisations in the Drees III cabinet, taking office on 29 October 1956. The Drees III cabinet fell on 11 December 1958 after the Catholic People's Party and the Labour Party (PvdA) disagreed on a proposed tax increase and continued to serve in a demissionary capacity until it was replaced by caretaker Beel II cabinet, with Struycken continuing as Deputy Prime Minister and Minister of the Interior, Property and Public Sector Organisations and also taking over as Minister of Justice, taking office on 22 December 1958. In January 1959, Struycken announced that he would not stand for the 1959 general election. Following the 1959 cabinet formation, after which the Beel II cabinet was replaced by the De Quay cabinet on 19 May, Struycken was not given a ministerial post in the new cabinet. In October 1959 he was nominated as member of the Council of State, taking office on 1 November 1959. The Cals cabinet fell on 14 October 1966 after the Night of Schmelzer and continued to serve in a demissionary capacity until it was replaced by the caretaker Zijlstra cabinet with Struycken again appointed as Minister of Justice, taking office on 22 November 1966.

== Biography ==
=== Early life ===
Antoon Arnold Marie Struycken was born on 27 December 1906 in Breda in the province of North Brabant in a Roman Catholic family. Struycken was interred in Kamp Sint-Michielsgestel prison camp during World War II.

=== Politics ===
He was among others Minister of Justice, Governor of the Netherlands Antilles, Minister of the Interior and a member of the Dutch Council of State. He was also alderman of Breda from 1938 to 1941, and from 1944 to 1950. After the war he was briefly Minister of Justice, in which capacity he commuted the death sentences of the "Breda Two" (Franz Fischer and Ferdinand aus der Fünten) to life imprisonment.

==== Governor of the Netherlands Antilles ====
While Governor of the Netherlands Antilles, Struycken came into conflict with the Council of Ministers of the Netherlands Antilles, who wanted to install S.W. van der Meer as Minister of Justice. Van der Meer, who had his own law practice in Curaçao, did not agree to give up his practice as a lawyer completely, prompting Struycken to refuse to install Van der Meer. The Dutch Antillean government complained to the government of the Kingdom of the Netherlands about the governor's inappropriate involvement in government matters. The Netherlands government eventually agreed with the Antillean government. This affair resulted in a reorientation of the office of Governor of the Netherlands Antilles, which increasingly began to resemble the role of the constitutional monarch in the Netherlands.

== Decorations ==
Honours
Ribbon bar	Honour	Country	Date	Comment
	Knight of the Order of the Netherlands Lion	Netherlands	15 March 1951	
	Grand Officer of the Order of Orange-Nassau	Netherlands	9 June 1959	

== Bibliography ==
- Klinkers, Gert; Klinkers, Inge (2001). Het Koninkrijk in de Caraïben: een korte geschiedenis van het Nederlandse dekolonisatiebeleid 1940-2000. Netherlands: Amsterdam University Press. ISBN 978-90-5356-466-0.

Political offices
Preceded by Johan van Maarseveen; Ad interim	Minister of Justice; 1950–1951	Succeeded by Hendrik Mulderije
Preceded by Leonard Peters	Governor of the Netherlands Antilles; 1951–1956	Succeeded by Frans van der Valk
Preceded by Louis Beel	Deputy Prime Minister; 1956–1959	Succeeded by Henk Korthals
Preceded by Ko Suurhoff; Ad interim as Minister of the Interior	Minister of the Interior, Property and Public Sector Organisations; 1956–1959	Succeeded by Edzo Toxopeus as Minister of the Interior
Preceded by Ivo Samkalden	Minister of Justice; 1958–1959	Succeeded by Albert Beerman
Preceded by Ivo Samkalden	Minister of Justice; 1966–1967	Succeeded by Carel Polak
