= Michiel Scheltema =

Dutch jurist, academic, and politician

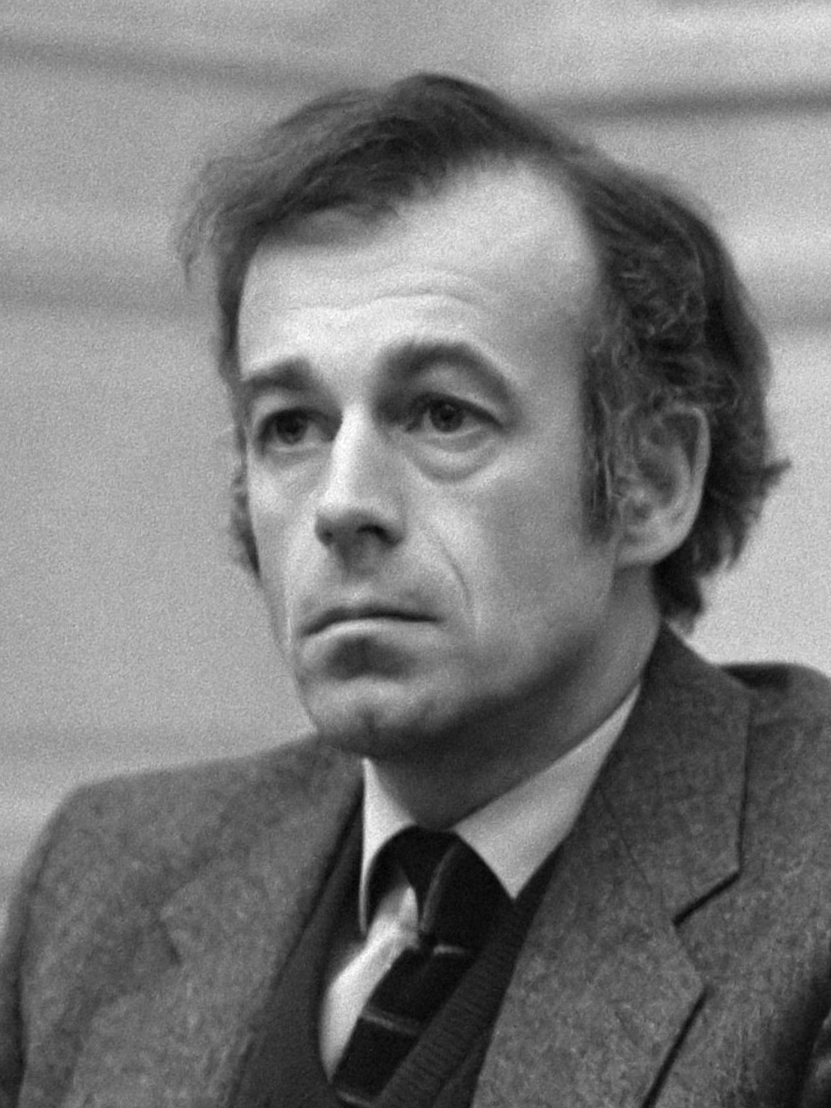
- Scheltema in 1981
- Born: 6 June 1939; The Hague, Netherlands
- Occupations: Jurist, professor, politician
- Known for: Founder of the General Administrative Law Act (Awb)
- Political party: Democrats 66
- Awards: Honorary doctorate (law), Leiden University (1995)

State Secretary for Justice
- In office 11 September 1981 – 4 November 1982
- Prime Minister: Dries van Agt
- Minister: Job de Ruiter
- Preceded by: Bert Haars
- Succeeded by: Virginie Korte-van Hemel

Director of the Scientific Council for Government Policy
- In office 1 January 1998 – 24 December 2004
- Preceded by: Piet Hein Donner
- Succeeded by: Wim van de Donk

Academic background
- Education: Leiden University

Academic work
- Discipline: Constitutional law, administrative law
- Institutions: University of Groningen, Scientific Council for Government Policy, Royal Netherlands Academy of Arts and Sciences

Michiel Scheltema (born 6 June 1939) is a former Dutch jurist, emeritus professor of law, and politician for Democrats 66 (D66).

Scheltema was elected a member of the Royal Netherlands Academy of Arts and Sciences in 1982.

Political offices
Preceded by Bert Haars	State Secretary for Justice; 1981–1982	Succeeded by Virginie Korte-van Hemel
Civic offices
Preceded by Piet Hein Donner	Director of the Scientific Council for Government Policy; 1998–2004	Succeeded by Wim van de Donk
