= Benk Korthals =

Dutch politician (born 1944)

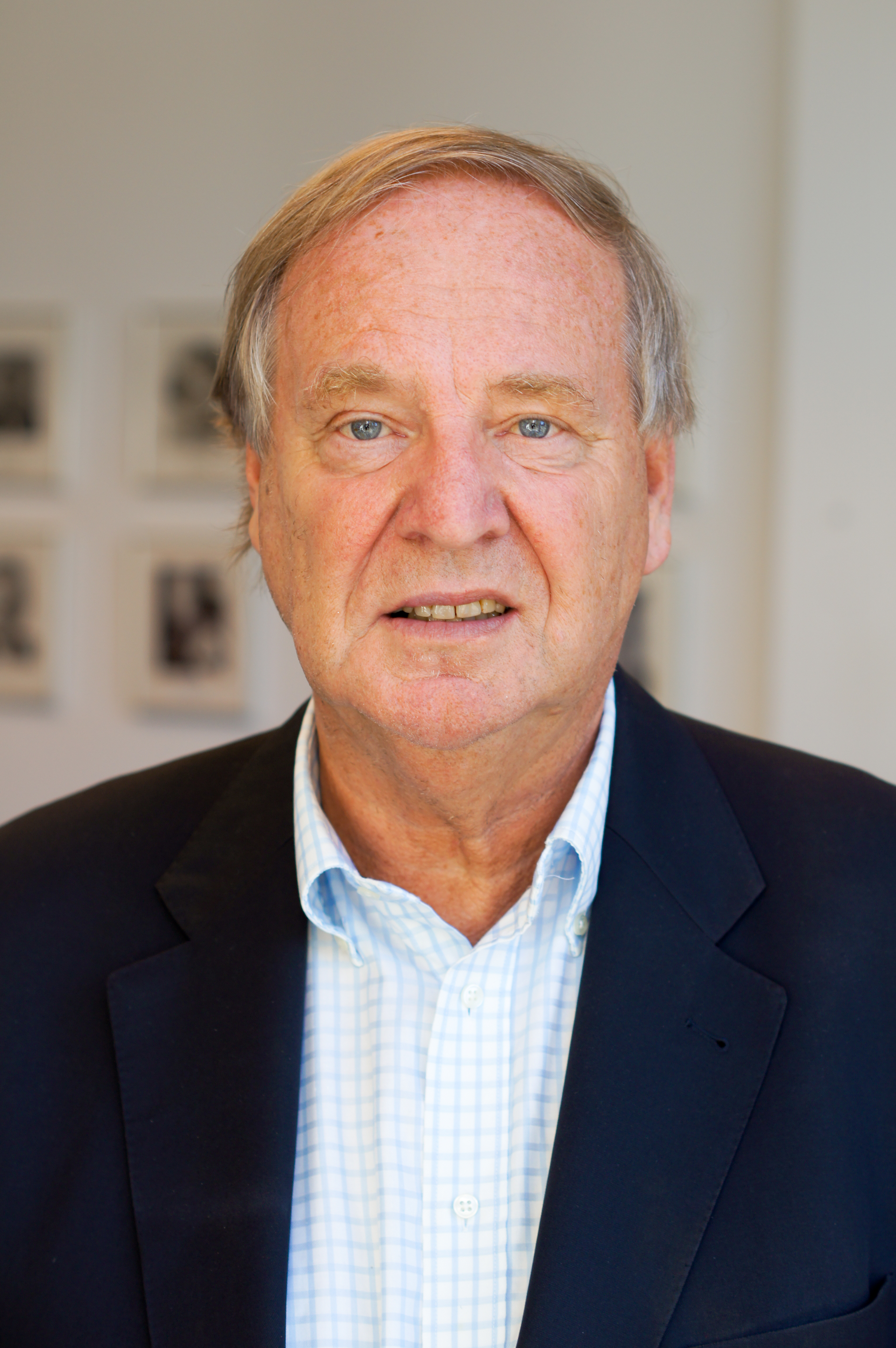
- Korthals in 2011

Chairman of the People's Party for Freedom and Democracy
- In office 22 May 2011 – 14 June 2014
- Leader: Mark Rutte
- Preceded by: Ivo Opstelten
- Succeeded by: Henry Keizer

Minister of Defence
- In office 22 July 2002 – 12 December 2002
- Prime Minister: Jan Peter Balkenende
- Preceded by: Frank de Grave
- Succeeded by: Henk Kamp

Minister of Justice
- In office 3 August 1998 – 22 July 2002
- Prime Minister: Wim Kok
- Preceded by: Winnie Sorgdrager
- Succeeded by: Piet Hein Donner

Member of the House of Representatives
- In office 23 May 2002 – 22 July 2002
- In office 16 September 1982 – 3 August 1998
- Parliamentary group: People's Party for Freedom and Democracy

Personal details
- Born: Albert Hendrik Korthals; 5 October 1944 (age 81) Voorschoten, Netherlands
- Party: People's Party for Freedom and Democracy (from 1977)
- Spouse: Alexandra Stemerding (m. 1977)
- Children: 3 children
- Parent: Henk Korthals (1911–1976) (father)
- Education: Leiden University (Bachelor of Laws, Master of Laws)
- Occupation: Politician · Jurist · Lawyer · Prosecutor

Military service
- Allegiance: Netherlands
- Branch/service: Royal Netherlands Navy
- Years of service: 1963–1965 (Conscription); 1965–1975 (Reserve)
- Rank: Lieutenant (J.G.)
- Unit: Naval squadron
- Battles/wars: Cold War

Albert Hendrik "Benk" Korthals (born 5 October 1944) is a retired Dutch politician of the People's Party for Freedom and Democracy (VVD) and jurist.

== Biography ==
Korthals attended the Gymnasium Leiden from June 1957 until June 1963 and applied at the Leiden University in June 1967 majoring in law and obtaining a Bachelor of Laws degree before graduating with a Master of Laws degree in July 1973. Korthals worked as a lawyer and prosecutor in Rotterdam from January 1974 until August 1998. Korthals was elected as a Member of the House of Representatives after the election of 1982, taking office on 16 September 1982. After the election of 1998 Korthals was appointed as Minister of Justice in the Cabinet Kok II, taking office on 3 August 1998. After the election of 2002 Korthals returned as a Member of the House of Representatives, taking office on 23 May 2002. Following the cabinet formation of 2002 Korthals was appointment as Minister of Defence in the Cabinet Balkenende I, taking office on 22 July 2002. On 12 December 2002 Korthals resigned following the conclusions of a parliamentary inquiry report into a construction fraud investigation that was mishandled by him while serving as Minister of Justice. Korthals also served as Chairman of the People's Party for Freedom and Democracy from 22 May 2011 until 14 June 2014.

== Decorations ==
Honours
Ribbon bar	Honour	Country	Date	Comment
	Knight of the Order of the Netherlands Lion	Netherlands	28 April 1995	
	Officer of the Order of Orange-Nassau	Netherlands	3 July 2003	
	Commemorative Medal for Advancing Latvia's Membership to NATO	Latvia	19 March 2004	

Party political offices
Preceded by Ivo Opstelten	Chairman of the People's Party for Freedom and Democracy; 2011–2014	Succeeded by Henry Keizer
Political offices
Preceded by Winnie Sorgdrager	Minister of Justice; 1998–2002	Succeeded by Piet Hein Donner
Preceded by Frank de Grave	Minister of Defence; 2002	Succeeded by Henk Kamp
