= Piet Hein Donner =

Dutch politician (born 1948)

His Excellency Piet Hein Donner
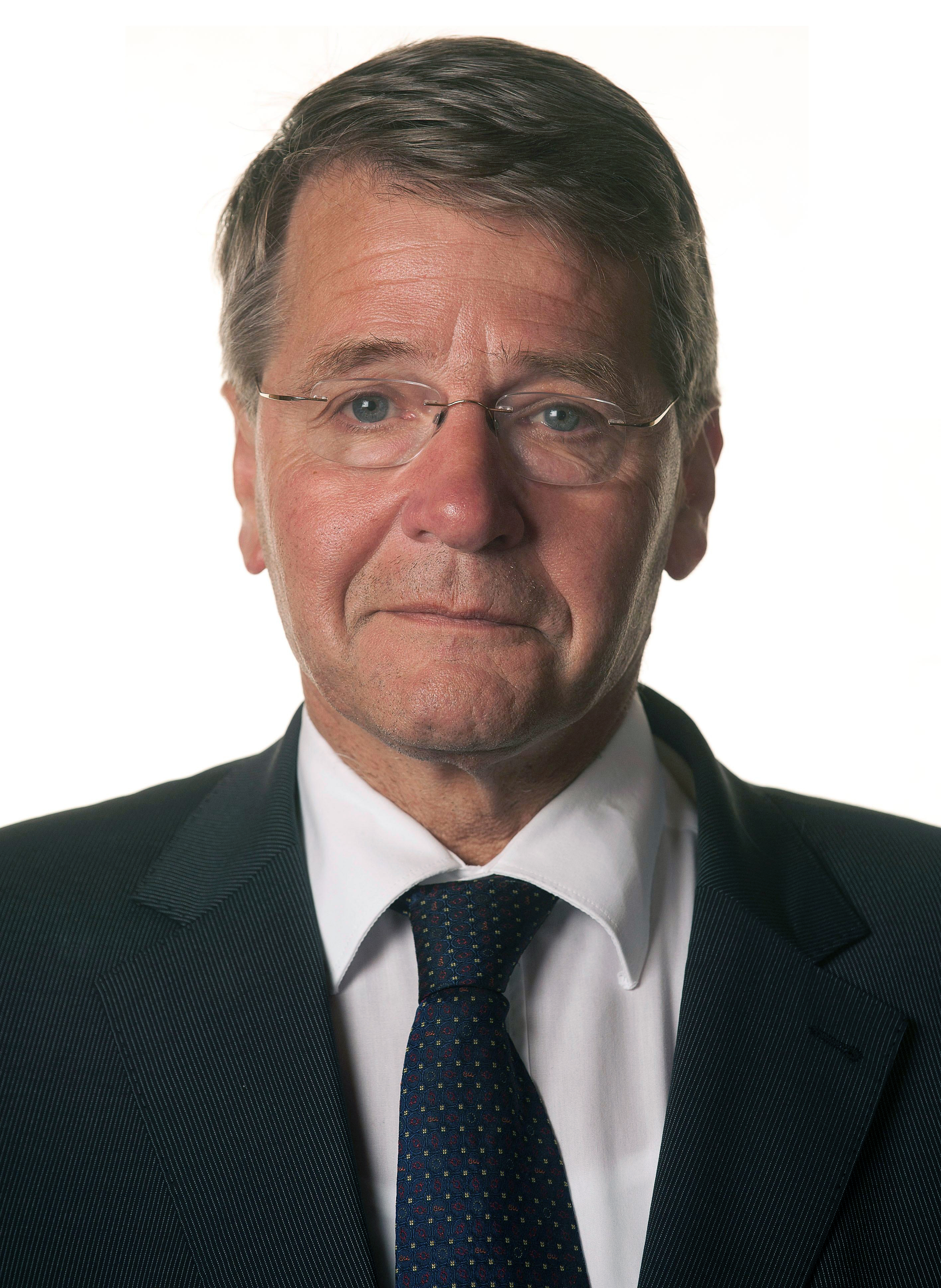
- Donner in 2010

Vice-President of the Council of State
- In office 1 February 2012 – 1 November 2018
- Monarchs: Beatrix; Willem-Alexander
- Preceded by: Herman Tjeenk Willink
- Succeeded by: Thom de Graaf

Minister of the Interior and Kingdom Relations
- In office 14 October 2010 – 16 December 2011
- Prime Minister: Mark Rutte
- Preceded by: Ernst Hirsch Ballin
- Succeeded by: Liesbeth Spies

Minister of Social Affairs and Employment
- In office 22 February 2007 – 14 October 2010
- Prime Minister: Jan Peter Balkenende
- Preceded by: Aart Jan de Geus
- Succeeded by: Henk Kamp

Member of the House of Representatives
- In office 30 November 2006 – 22 February 2007

Minister of Justice
- In office 22 July 2002 – 21 September 2006
- Prime Minister: Jan Peter Balkenende
- Preceded by: Benk Korthals
- Succeeded by: Rita Verdonk (Ad interim)

Member of the Council of State
- In office 22 December 1997 – 22 July 2002
- Vice President: Herman Tjeenk Willink

Chair of the Scientific Council for Government Policy
- In office 1 January 1993 – 22 December 1997
- Preceded by: Frans Rutten
- Succeeded by: Michiel Scheltema

Member of the Scientific Council for Government Policy
- In office 1 January 1990 – 1 January 1993
- Director: Frans Rutten

Personal details
- Born: Jan Pieter Hendrik Donner; 20 October 1948 (age 77) Amsterdam, Netherlands
- Party: Christian Democratic Appeal (from 1980)
- Other political affiliations: Anti-Revolutionary Party (until 1980)
- Spouse: Liesbeth Maria Quanjer (m. 1973)
- Children: 3 sons
- Parent: André Donner (1918–1992) (father)
- Relatives: Jan Hein Donner (uncle); Jan Donner (grandfather)
- Education: Free University Amsterdam (Bachelor of Laws, Master of Laws); University of Michigan (Juris Doctor)
- Occupation: Politician · Civil servant · Jurist · Researcher · Nonprofit director · Professor

Jan Pieter Hendrik "Piet Hein" Donner (born 20 October 1948) is a retired Dutch politician of the Christian Democratic Appeal (CDA) party and jurist. He was granted the honorary title of Minister of State on 21 December 2018.

== Early life and career ==
The Donner family has produced a number of Calvinist judges. Piet Hein Donner's father, André Donner, was a judge at the European Court of Justice between 1958 and 1979, and was part of the government commission that looked into Prince Bernhard of Lippe-Biesterfeld's dealings with the Lockheed Corporation. His grandfather was Jan Donner, who served as Minister of Justice for the Anti-Revolutionary Party in the first De Geer cabinet and was later president of the Dutch Supreme Court. His uncle Jan Hein Donner was a chess grandmaster and author.

Donner attended a gymnasium in Amsterdam from March 1961 until May 1967 and applied at the Vrije Universiteit Amsterdam in June 1967, majoring in Law and obtaining a Bachelor of Laws degree in April 1969 before graduating with a Master of Laws degree in July 1973. During his study, he joined the student society L.A.N.X. in 1968. Donner applied at the University of Michigan in Ann Arbor, Michigan in September 1973 for a postgraduate education in Law, working as a student researcher before obtaining an Juris Doctor degree in July 1976. Donner worked as a civil servant from July 1976 until December 1997, for the department of Legal Affairs of the Ministry of Economic Affairs from August 1976 until March 1981, as a paralegal for the office of Juridical Support of the House of Representatives from March 1981 until November 1984, and for the department of Public Law of the Ministry of Justice from November 1984 until January 1990. In December 1989 Donner was appointed as a member of the Scientific Council for Government Policy (WRR), taking office on 1 January 1990. In December 1992 Donner was nominated as director of the WRR, taking office on 1 January 1993. In December 1997 Donner was nominated as a member of the Council of State. He was installed as a Member of the Council of State, taking office on 22 December 1997, resigning as director of the WRR on the same day.

== Political career ==
After the 2002 general election, Donner was appointed informateur for the cabinet formation. Following the cabinet formation, Donner was appointed as Minister of Justice in the first Balkenende cabinet, taking office on 22 July 2002. The cabinet resigned just four months later on 16 October, and continued to serve in a demissionary capacity. After the succeeding 2003 general election, Donner retained his ministerial post in the second Balkenende cabinet, which took office on 27 May 2003.

In 2006, Donner recorded a rap song together with Meester G to explain his point of view on the Dutch soft-drug policy in response to a song by Gerd Leers, Mayor of Maastricht with punk band Heideroosjes, which called for a more progressive policy which would not only regulate the selling of soft drugs, but also legalise their production.

The second Balkenende cabinet fell on 30 June 2006 after the Democrats 66 had lost confidence in Minister for Integration and Asylum Affairs Rita Verdonk, and continued to serve in a demissionary capacity until 7 July, when it was replaced by the caretaker third Balkenende cabinet, with Donner remaining Minister of Justice.

On 13 September 2006, Donner was the subject of controversy when he suggested Islamic law could be established in the Netherlands by democratic means. He responded by a clarification that he was not advocating such a scenario but warning against it. In the same month, a Dutch Safety Board report into a fire at Schiphol Airport jail was released, condemning Dutch government officials. Donner and Minister of Housing, Spatial Planning and the Environment Sybilla Dekker, as politically responsible cabinet members, resigned following the report's conclusions. Donner was succeeded by Ernst Hirsch Ballin, who had been justice minister in the third Lubbers cabinet.

Donner was elected to the House of Representatives in the 2006 general election, taking office on 30 November 2006. Following the succeeding cabinet formation, Donner was appointed Minister of Social Affairs and Employment in the fourth Balkenende cabinet, taking office on 22 February 2007. This cabinet resigned on 20 February 2010 after tensions in the coalition over the extension of Dutch involvement in the Task Force Uruzgan mission of the International Security Assistance Force (ISAF) in Afghanistan, and continued to serve in a demissionary capacity. In March 2010, Donner announced that he would not stand in the election of that year. Following the 2010 cabinet formation, Donner was appointed as Minister of the Interior and Kingdom Relations in the first Rutte cabinet, taking office on 14 October 2010.

In December 2011 Donner was nominated as Vice-President of the Council of State. He resigned as Minister of the Interior and Kingdom Relations on 16 December 2011 and was installed as Vice-President of the Council of State on 1 February 2012, serving until 1 November 2018. Donner also served as a distinguished professor of Minority rights at Leiden University, holding the Cleveringa Chair, from 1 September 2015 until 1 September 2016.

== Later activities ==
Since his retirement, Donner has occupied numerous seats as nonprofit director for supervisory boards in the business and industry world and several international non-governmental organisations and research institutes, including the Netherlands Institute for Multiparty Democracy, the Rijksmuseum van Oudheden, the Netherlands Atlantic Association, the Royal Netherlands Historical Society and the Carnegie Foundation. He also served on several state commissions on behalf of the government.

== Decorations ==
Honours
Ribbon bar	Honour	Country	Date	Comment
	Grand Officer of the Order of Orange-Nassau	Netherlands	1 November 2018	
Honorific Titles
Ribbon bar	Honour	Country	Date	Comment
	Minister of State	Netherlands	21 December 2018	Style of Excellency

Political offices
Preceded by Benk Korthals	Minister of Justice; 2002–2006	Succeeded by Rita Verdonk; Ad interim
Preceded by Aart Jan de Geus	Minister of Social Affairs and Employment; 2007–2010	Succeeded by Henk Kamp
Preceded by Ernst Hirsch Ballin	Minister of the Interior and Kingdom Relations; 2010–2011	Succeeded by Liesbeth Spies
Preceded by Herman Tjeenk Willink	Vice-President of the Council of State; 2012–2018	Succeeded by Thom de Graaf
Civic offices
Preceded by Frans Rutten	Director of the Scientific Council for Government Policy; 1993–1997	Succeeded by Michiel Scheltema
Academic offices
Preceded by Carol Gluck	Distinguished Professor; Cleveringa Chair of Leiden University; 2015–2016	Succeeded by Joanne Liu
Non-profit organization positions
Preceded by Ben Bot	Chairman of the Carnegie Foundation; 2019–present	Incumbent
