= Sybilla Dekker =

Dutch politician (born 1942)

Her Excellency Sybilla Dekker
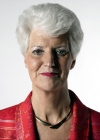
- Dekker in 2010

Minister of Housing, Spatial Planning and the Environment
- In office 27 May 2003 – 21 September 2006
- Prime Minister: Jan Peter Balkenende
- Preceded by: Henk Kamp
- Succeeded by: Karla Peijs (ad interim)

Personal details
- Born: Sybilla Maria Dekker; 23 March 1942 (age 84) Alkmaar, Netherlands
- Party: People's Party for Freedom and Democracy
- Spouses: First husband (m. 1969; died 1977) Constant van Gestel (m. 1983; died 2005)
- Domestic partner: Ben Bot (since 2007)
- Education: Utrecht University (Bachelor of Business Management)
- Occupation: Politician · Civil servant · Businesswoman · Corporate director · Nonprofit director · Trade association executive · Management consultant · Social worker

Sybilla Maria Dekker (born 23 March 1942) is a retired Dutch politician of the People's Party for Freedom and Democracy (VVD) and businesswoman. She was granted the honorary title of Minister of State on 22 June 2018.

A member of the People's Party for Freedom and Democracy (VVD), she was minister of Housing, Spatial Planning and the Environment in the second and third Balkenende cabinets. She resigned on 21 September 2006, after the publication of the Dutch Safety Board report about the fire that occurred in 2005 at the Amsterdam Airport Schiphol, killing 11 people.

Since 2008, she has been the domestic partner of former Minister of Foreign Affairs Ben Bot.

== Decorations ==
Honours
Ribbon bar	Honour	Country	Date	Comment
	Officer of the Order of Orange-Nassau	Netherlands	11 April 2007	

Honorific titles
Ribbon bar	Honour	Country	Date	Comment
	Minister of State	Netherlands	22 June 2018	Style of Excellency

Political offices
Preceded by Henk Kamp	Minister of Housing, Spatial; Planning and the Environment; 2003–2006	Succeeded by Karla Peijs; Ad interim
