= Immigration and Naturalisation Service (Netherlands) =

Dutch government agency

Immigration and Naturalisation Service Immigratie en Naturalisatiedienst

Jurisdictional structure
- Operations jurisdiction: Netherlands
- Legal jurisdiction: Netherlands

Operational structure
- Minister responsible: Bart van den Brink, Minister of Asylum and Migration
- Agency executive: Rhodia Maas, Director General IND
- Parent agency: Ministry of Justice and Security

Website
- https://ind.nl/en

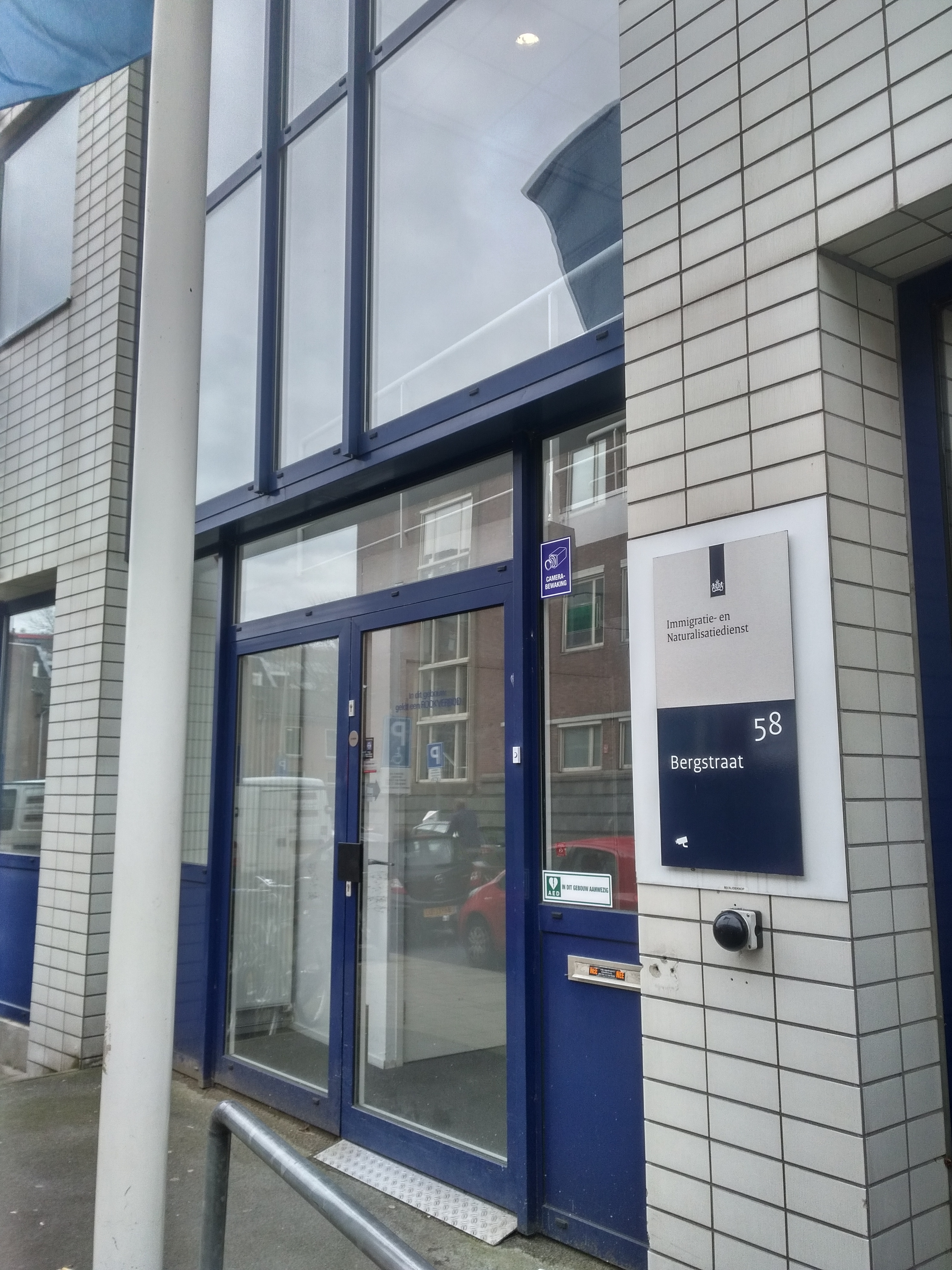
An office of the Immigration and Naturalisation Service in Utrecht.

The Immigration and Naturalisation Service (Dutch: Immigratie en Naturalisatiedienst; IND), is a Dutch government agency that handles the admission of foreigners in the Netherlands. It is part of the Ministry of Justice and Security. The IND processes all applications for asylum, family reunification, visas, naturalisation, and other residence permits.

On behalf of the Deputy Minister of Security and Justice (since 2026 Claudia van Bruggen) the IND implements the aliens policy, the aliens act (Dutch: 'Vreemdelingenwet') and the Netherlands nationality act (Dutch: 'Rijkswet op het Nederlanderschap').

From 1999 to 2003, future prime minister of the Netherlands Dick Schoof was director general of the IND. The Netherlands was experiencing a relatively high influx of asylum seekers as a result of the Kosovo War, and the organization had a significant backlog of requests. Schoof was responsible for implementing reforms to the Aliens Act by State Secretary for Justice Job Cohen in 2001 that simplified the asylum procedure, and he worked to deport applicants that did not qualify.
