= Scientific Council for Government Policy =

Think tank of the Government of the Netherlands

- Wetenschappelijke Raad voor het Regeringsbeleid
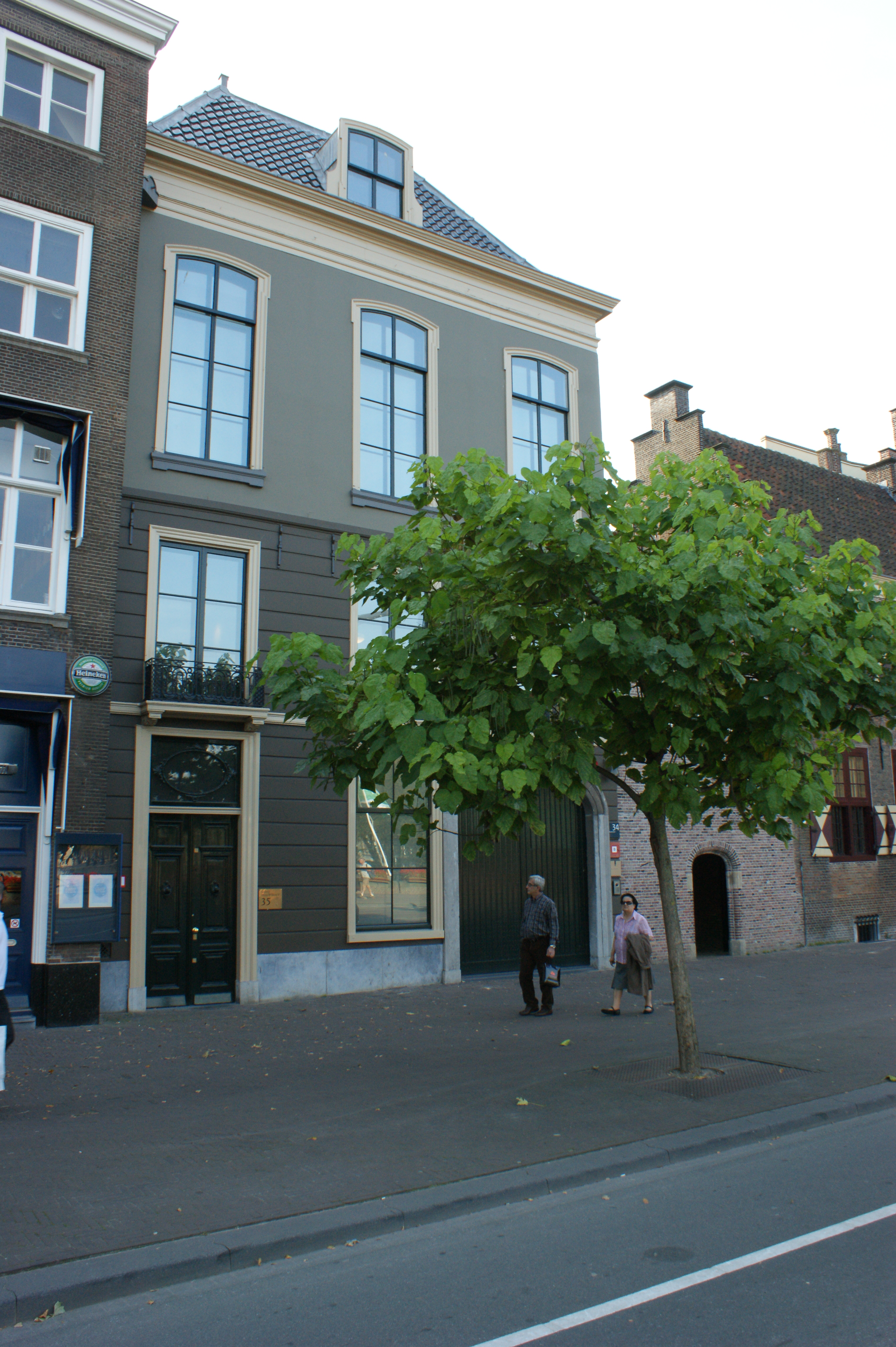
- Headquarters in The Hague
- Abbreviation: WRR
- Formation: 20 November 1972; 53 years ago
- Type: Governmental organisation
- Headquarters: The Hague, Netherlands
- Budget: $35 million (as of 2001)
- Website: english.wrr.nl

The Scientific Council for Government Policy (Dutch: Wetenschappelijke Raad voor het Regeringsbeleid, WRR) is an independent think tank of the Government of the Netherlands based in The Hague, whose members include prominent social scientists, economists and legal scholars.

== Mission ==
The Council's objective is to identify and advise the government on "future trends and developments" on issues that are of great importance for society by taking a multidisciplinary approach. In addition to its 88 reports, it has published more than 170 preliminary studies and investigations as well as more than 250 working documents; several of the reports and studies on agriculture, development cooperation, and foreign policy have been disseminated internationally.

== History ==
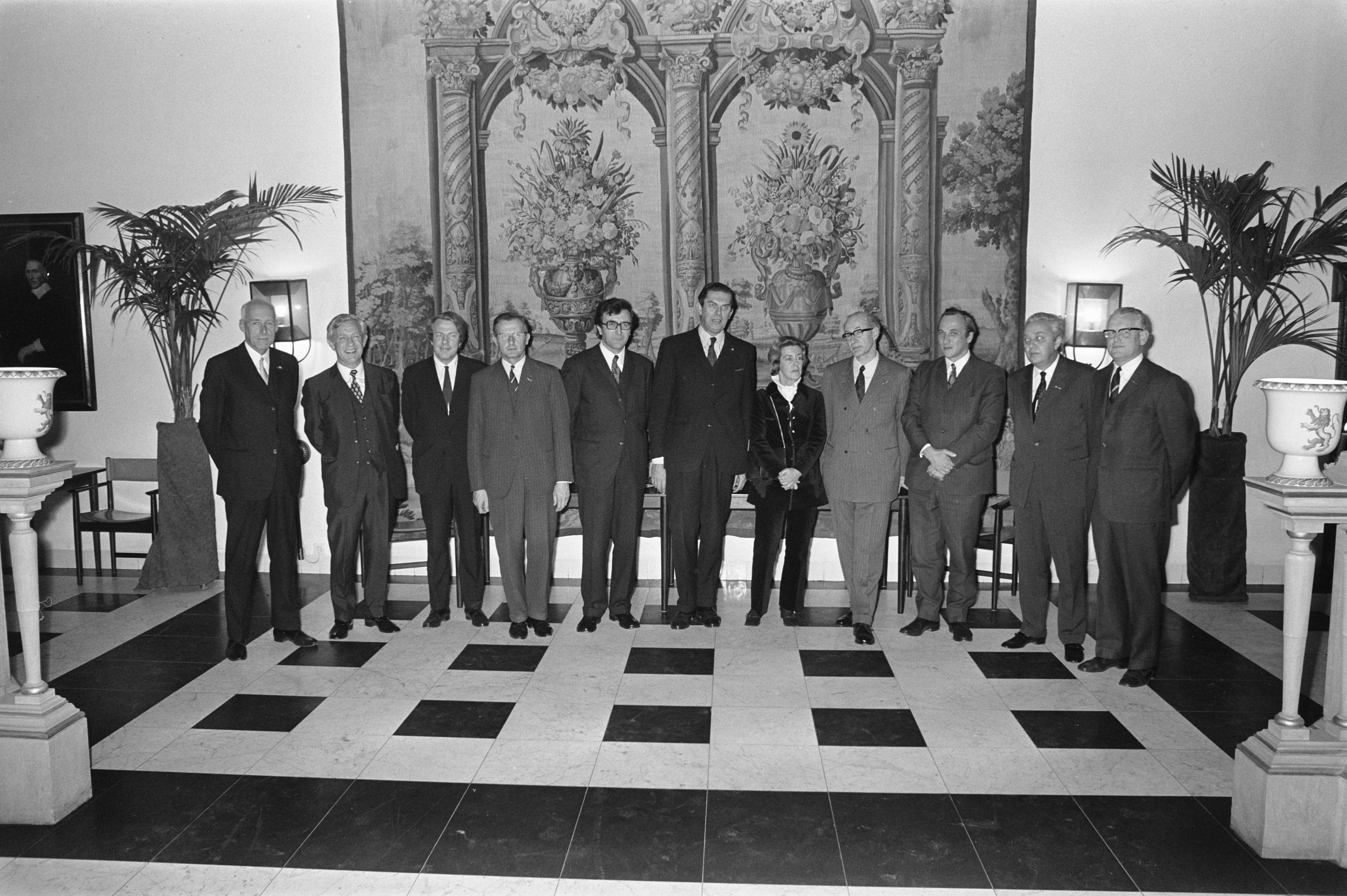
Prime Minister Barend Biesheuvel with the WRR in 1972

The WRR was founded by the "Act Establishing a Scientific Council on Government Policy of 30 June 1976" (known as "Instellingswet WRR") and began activity on 20 November 1972, as a temporary advisory council of the government. The first council took a predominantly theoretical approach based on science as well as the "emerging disciplines of political science and public administration".

In the 1990s, under the chairmanship of Piet Hein Donner, a number of changes were formalised—WRR's focus shifted "from substantive policy...to shaping those parameters of policy". The first external evaluation of WRR was carried out in 2001 by the Alexander Rinnooy Kan Commission, after which WRR "raised its public profile"—meaning its composition became more flexible, with foreign experts invited in addition to Dutch ones. It also started delivering oral presentations of reports to various stakeholders.

== Membership ==
The Council consists of five to eleven members and is a working council, this means the members themselves do research and write reports. They do this in cooperation with the scientific staff. Decisions of the Council are made collectively. Council members are appointed for a term of five years. They may serve a maximum of two terms. The present Council term expires at the end of 2017.

The Council falls under the responsibility of the Ministry of General Affairs. The Council has at least five members who are appointed to five-year terms.

=== Chairs ===
Council chairs have been:

- Sjeng Kremers (1972–1977)
- Wim Schut (1977–1978)
- Theo Quené (1978–1985)
- Cees de Wit (1985)
- Wil Albeda (1985–1990)
- Frans Rutten (1990–1993)
- Piet Hein Donner (1993–1997)
- Michiel Scheltema (1998–2004)
- Wim van de Donk (2004–2009)
- André Knottnerus (2010–2017)
- Corien Prins (2017–present)
