= Custodial Institutions Agency =

The logo of the Custodial Institutions Agency.

The Custodial Institutions Agency (Dutch: Dienst Justitiële Inrichtingen, lit. 'Department of Correctional Institutions', DJI) is responsible for the incarceration of adults in the Netherlands. It is subordinate to the Ministry of Public Safety and Justice. The agency has its headquarters in The Hague.

The agency's sole institution in the Caribbean Netherlands is the JI Caribisch Nederland in Kralendijk, Bonaire.
