= Gijs de Vries =

Dutch politician and diplomat

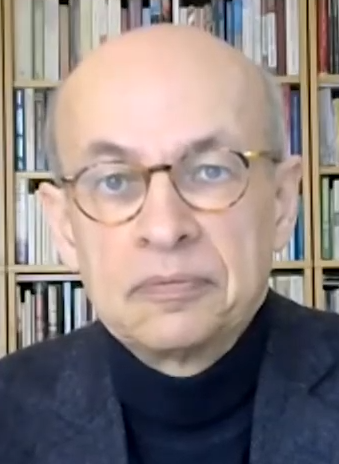

Member of the European Court of Auditors
- In office 1 January 2011 – 1 January 2014

Member of the Court of Audit
- In office 1 January 2008 – 1 January 2011

European Union Counter-terrorism Coordinator
- In office 25 March 2004 – 1 March 2007
- Secretary-General: Javier Solana
- Preceded by: Office established
- Succeeded by: Gilles de Kerchove

Member of the House of Representatives
- In office 23 May 2002 – 8 October 2002

State Secretary for the Interior and Kingdom Relations
- In office 3 August 1998 – 22 July 2002
- Prime Minister: Wim Kok
- Preceded by: Tonny van de Vondervoort; Jacob Kohnstamm (as State Secretaries for the Interior)
- Succeeded by: Rob Hessing

Member of the European Parliament
- In office 24 July 1984 – 3 August 1998
- Parliamentary group: European Liberal Democrat and Reform Party Group (1994–1998); Liberal and Democratic Reformist Group (1985–1994); Liberal and Democratic Group (1984–1985)
- Constituency: Netherlands

Personal details
- Born: Gijsbert Marius de Vries; 22 February 1956 (age 70) New York City, New York, United States
- Party: Democrats 66 (since 2010)
- Other political affiliations: People's Party for Freedom and Democracy (1974–2010)
- Education: Leiden University
- Occupation: Politician · Diplomat · Civil servant · Economist · Researcher · Author · Professor

Gijsbert Marius "Gijs" de Vries (born 22 February 1956) is a retired Dutch-American politician and diplomat who served as State Secretary for the Interior and Kingdom Relations from 1998 to 2002 and European Union Counter-terrorism Coordinator from 2004 until 2007. He was a member of the People's Party for Freedom and Democracy (VVD) until 2010, when he joined the Democrats 66 (D66) party.

== Career ==
=== Political career ===
From 1984 to 1998, Gijs de Vries was a Member of the European Parliament (MEP) for three consecutive terms. From 1994 to 1998, he was chairman of the group of the European Liberal Democrat and Reform Party.

De Vries resigned from the European Parliament to become State Secretary for the Interior and Kingdom Relations under the Second Kok cabinet.

=== EU Anti-Terrorism Coordinator, 2004–2007 ===
De Vries served as the European Union's anti-terrorism coordinator from March 2004 to March 2007. In this capacity, he worked for Javier Solana in the Police and Judicial Co-operation in Criminal Matters (PJCCM) pillar. Solana outlined his duties as being to streamline, organise and co-ordinate the EU and its members fight against terrorism.

De Vries stood down from the post in March 2007, citing personal reasons, although it is commonly understood that the position's mandate did not have the necessary operational powers, as well as an overall reluctance within member states to supply information regarding anti-terror activities, even though the member states fully supported the establishment of the anti-terrorism coordinator after the 2004 Madrid train bombings. In September 2007, MEPs called for the post to be filled, having been vacant for six months, as well as for it to be given real powers to carry out the post's tasks. On 20 September 2007, the Belgian Gilles de Kerchove was appointed to succeed De Vries in the post.

=== Later career ===
As of September 2008, De Vries was chairman of the European Security Research and Innovation Forum (ESRIF).

Prior to 2010 De Vries had been a member of the People's Party for Freedom and Democracy (VVD). However, due to dissatisfaction at the VVD's decision to form the First Rutte cabinet, a minority government with the support of the Party for Freedom (PVV) led by nationalist Geert Wilders he left the party and joined the social-liberal Democrats 66 (D66) party then in opposition.

In 2025, the European Commission appointed De Vries as member of its Ukraine Facility’s audit board, chaired by Marek Belka.

== Decorations ==
Honours
Ribbon bar	Honour	Country	Date	Comment
	Officer of the Order of Orange-Nassau	Netherlands	1 March 2007	Elevated from Knight (10 December 2002)

Political offices
Preceded by Tonny van de Vondervoort as State Secretary for the Interior	State Secretary for the Interior and Kingdom Relations; 1998–2002	Succeeded by Rob Hessing
Preceded by Jacob Kohnstamm as State Secretary for the Interior	State Secretary for the Interior and Kingdom Relations; 1998–2002	Succeeded by Rob Hessing
Diplomatic posts
Office established	European Union Counter-terrorism Coordinator; 2004–2007	Succeeded by Gilles de Kerchove
