= List of ministers of the interior of the Netherlands =

Minister of the Interior and Kingdom Relations of the Netherlands
- Minister van Binnenlandse Zaken en Koninkrijksrelaties
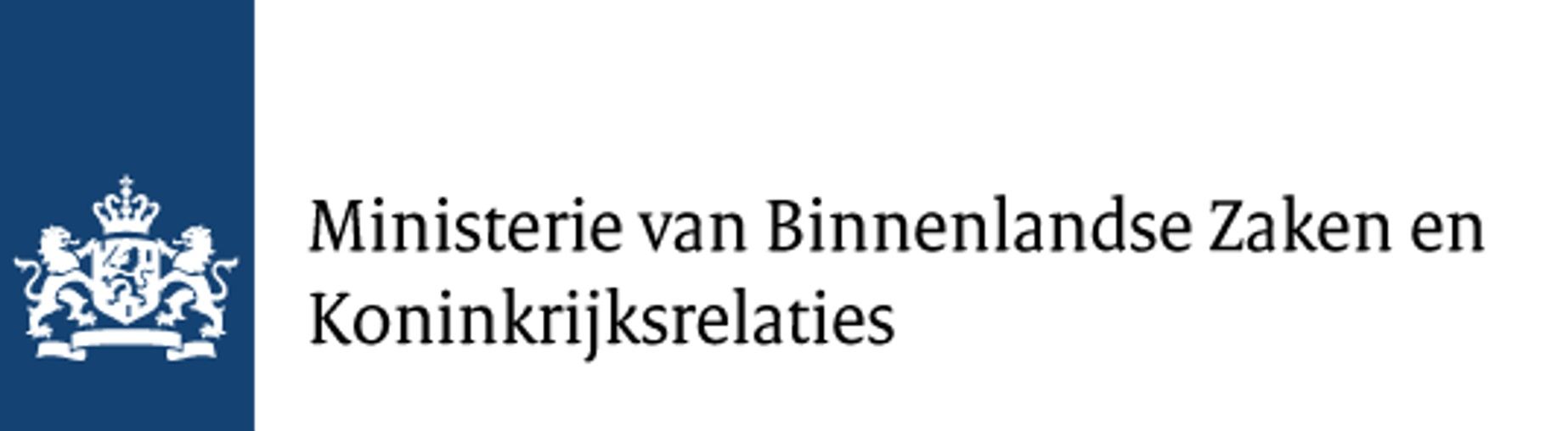
- Ministry of the Interior and Kingdom Relations

- Flag of the Kingdom of the Netherlands

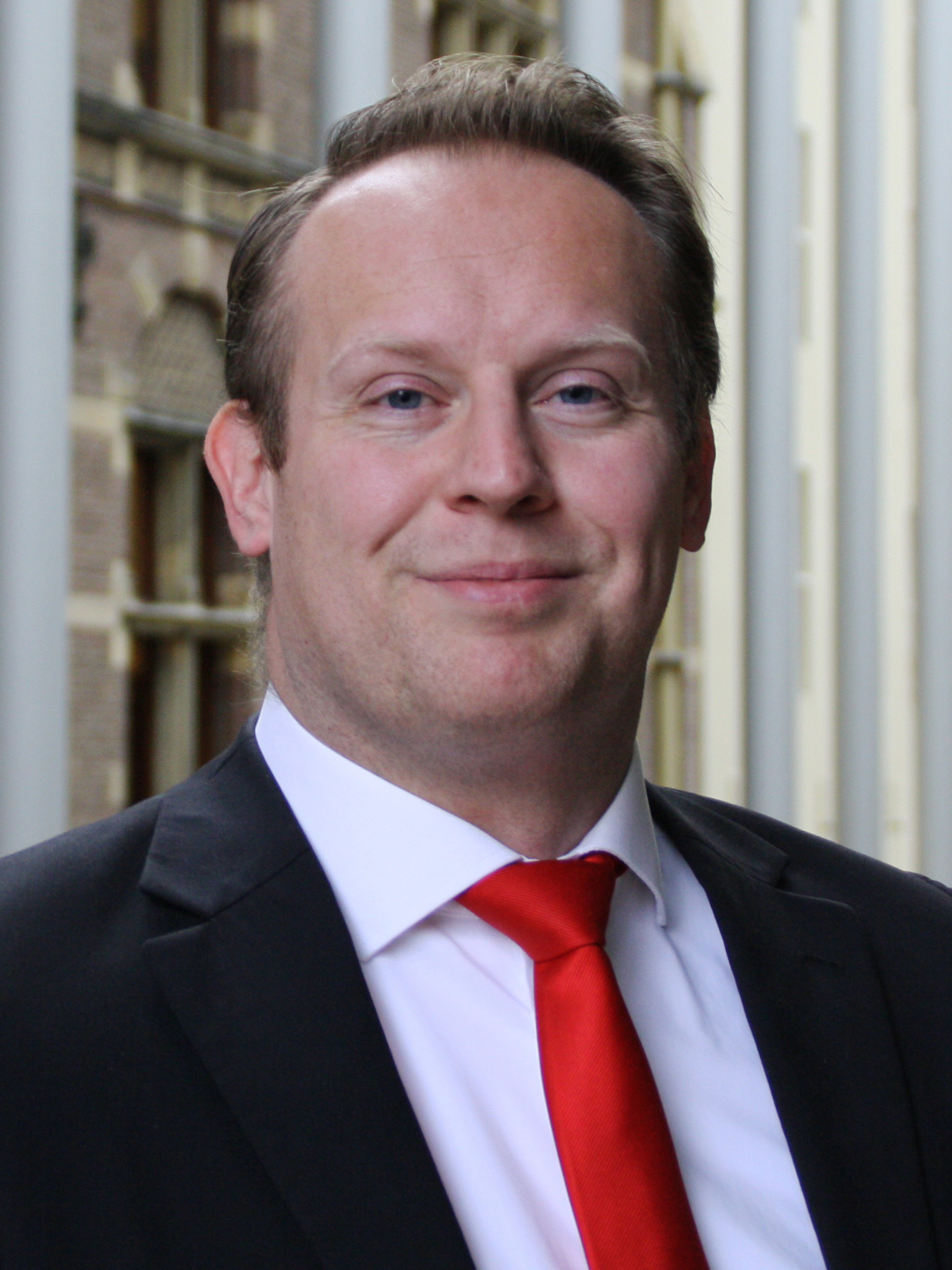
- Incumbent; Pieter Heerma since 23 February 2026
- Ministry of the Interior and Kingdom Relations
- Style: His/Her Excellency
- Member of: Council of Ministers
- Appointer: The monarch; on advice of the prime minister
- Formation: 12 March 1798; 228 years ago
- First holder: Alexander Gogel as Secretary for the Interior
- Deputy: Eric van der Burg as State Secretary for Reparations for Groningen
- Salary: €205,991 (As of 2025)

The minister of the interior and kingdom relations (Dutch: Minister van Binnenlandse Zaken en Koninkrijksrelaties) is the head of the Ministry of the Interior and Kingdom Relations and a member of the Cabinet and the Council of Ministers. The incumbent minister is Pieter Heerma of the Christian Democratic Appeal (CDA) who has been in office since 23 February 2026. Regularly, a state secretary is assigned to the ministry who is tasked with specific portfolios. The current state secretary is Eric van der Burg.

== List of ministers ==
=== 1801–1866 ===
Agent of the Interior		Term of office	Party	Regime
	Alexander Gogel (1765–1821)	19 June 1801 – 4 July 1801	Independent	Staatsbewind
Secretary of State for the Interior		Term of office	Party	Regime
	Hendrik van Stralen (1751–1821)	2 May 1805 – 20 June 1806	Independent	Rutger Jan Schimmelpenninck
Minister of the Interior		Term of office	Party	Regime
	Johan Hendrik Mollerus (1750–1834)	4 July 1806 – 17 May 1808	Independent	Louis I
	Frédéric Auguste van Leyden van Westbarendrecht (1768–1821)	17 May 1808 – 8 December 1808	Independent	Louis I
	Adriaan Pieter Twent van Raaphorst (1745–1816)	8 December 1808 – 27 May 1809	Independent	Louis I
Minister of Worship and the Interior		Term of office	Party	Regime
	Godert van der Capellen (1778–1848)	27 May 1809 – 1 January 1811	Independent	Louis I
Commissioner-General for the Interior		Term of office	Party	Regime
	Hendrik van Stralen (1751–1821)	29 November 1813 – 6 April 1814	Independent	William Frederick
Secretary of State for the Interior		Term of office	Party	Regime
	Jonkheer; Willem Frederik Röell (1767–1835)	6 April 1814 – 9 February 1817	Independent	William Frederick / William I
Minister of the Interior		Term of office	Party	Regime
	Patrice de Coninck (1770–1827)	21 February 1817 – 1 January 1820	Independent	William I
Minister of the Interior, Water Management and Public Works		Term of office	Party	Regime
	Patrice de Coninck (1770–1827)	1 January 1820 – 30 March 1824	Independent	William I
Minister of the Interior, Education and Water Management		Term of office	Party	Regime
	Patrice de Coninck (1770–1827)	30 March 1824 – 5 April 1825	Independent	William I
Minister of the Interior		Term of office	Party	Regime
	Patrice de Coninck (1770–1827)	5 April 1825 – 22 June 1825	Independent	William I
	Pierre van Gobbelschroy (1784–1850)	22 June 1825 – 1 January 1830	Independent	William I
	Jonkheer; Edmond de la Coste (1778–1870)	1 January 1830 – 22 October 1830	Independent	William I
	Hendrik Jacob van Doorn van Westcapelle (1786–1853)	4 October 1830 – 1 December 1836	Independent	William I
	Hendrik Merkus de Kock (1779–1845)	1 December 1836 – 1 June 1841	Independent	William I
	Hendrik Merkus de Kock (1779–1845)	1 December 1836 – 1 June 1841	Independent	William II
	Willem Anne Schimmelpenninck van der Oye (1800–1872)	1 June 1841 – 15 February 1846	Independent	William II
	Johan Adriaan van der Heim van Duivendijke (1791–1870)	15 February 1846 – 1 June 1846; Ad interim	Independent	William II
	Cornelis Vollenhoven (1778–1849)	1 June 1846 – 12 October 1846; Ad interim	Independent	William II
	Lodewijk Napoleon van Randwijck (1807–1891)	12 October 1846 – 1 January 1848	Independent	William II
	Johan Adriaan van der Heim van Duivendijke (1791–1870)	1 January 1848 – 25 March 1848	Independent	William II
Minister of the Interior		Term of office	Party	Prime Minister (Cabinet)
	Lodewijk Caspar Luzac (1786–1861)	25 March 1848 – 13 May 1848^{[Res]}	Independent	Gerrit Schimmelpenninck (Schimmelpenninck)
Jacob de Kempenaer	Jacob de Kempenaer (Prime Minister Nov 1848–Nov 1849) (1793–1870)	13 May 1848 – 1 November 1849	Independent	Gerrit Schimmelpenninck (Schimmelpenninck)
Jacob de Kempenaer	Jacob de Kempenaer (Prime Minister Nov 1848–Nov 1849) (1793–1870)	13 May 1848 – 1 November 1849	Independent	Jacob de Kempenaer (De Kempenaer-Donker Curtius)
Johan Rudolph Thorbecke	Dr. Johan Rudolph Thorbecke (Prime Minister) (1798–1872)	1 November 1849 – 19 April 1853	Independent	Johan Rudolph Thorbecke (Thorbecke I)
Gerlach Cornelis Joannes van Reenen	Jonkheer; Gerlach Cornelis Joannes van Reenen (1818–1893)	19 April 1853 – 1 July 1856	Independent	Floris Adriaan van Hall (Van Hall-Donker Curtius)
Gerrit Simons	Dr. Gerrit Simons (1802–1868)	1 July 1856 – 19 January 1857^{[Res]}	Independent	Justinus van der Brugghen (Van der Brugghen)
Anthony Gerhard Alexander	Ridder; Anthony Gerhard Alexander van Rappard (1799–1869)	19 January 1857 – 18 March 1858	Independent	Justinus van der Brugghen (Van der Brugghen)
Gerlach Cornelis Joannes van Reenen	Jonkheer; Jacob George Hieronymus van Tets van Goudriaan (1812–1885)	18 March 1858 – 23 February 1860	Independent	Jan Jacob Rochussen (Rochussen)
Schelto van Heemstra	Baron; Schelto van Heemstra (1807–1864)	2 March 1860 – 31 January 1862	Independent	Floris Adriaan van Hall (Van Hall-Van Heemstra)
Schelto van Heemstra	Baron; Schelto van Heemstra (1807–1864)	2 March 1860 – 31 January 1862	Independent	Jacob van Zuylen van Nijevelt (Van Zuylen van Nijevelt-Van Heemstra)
Johan Rudolph Thorbecke	Dr. Johan Rudolph Thorbecke (Prime Minister) (1798–1872)	31 January 1862 – 10 February 1866	Independent	Johan Rudolph Thorbecke (Thorbecke II)
Johan Herman Geertsema	Johan Herman Geertsema (1816–1908)	10 February 1866 – 1 June 1866	Independent	Isaäc Dignus Fransen van de Putte (Fransen van de Putte)

=== 1866–1945 ===
Minister of the Interior		Term of office	Party	Prime Minister (Cabinet)
Jan Heemskerk	Dr. Jan Heemskerk (1818–1897)	1 June 1866 – 4 June 1868	Independent; Conservative (Liberal Conservative)	Jules van Zuylen van Nijevelt (Van Zuylen van Nijevelt)
Cornelis Fock	Cornelis Fock (1828–1910)	4 June 1868 – 4 January 1871	Independent; Liberal (Classical Liberal)	Pieter Philip van Bosse (Van Bosse–Fock)
Johan Rudolph Thorbecke	Dr. Johan Rudolph Thorbecke (Prime Minister) (1798–1872)	4 January 1871 – 4 June 1872^{[Died]}	Independent; Liberal (Classical Liberal)	Johan Rudolph Thorbecke (Thorbecke III)
Pieter Philip van Bosse	Pieter Philip van Bosse (Minister of Colonial Affairs) (1809–1879)	4 June 1872 – 6 July 1872^{[Ad interim]}	Independent; Liberal (Classical Liberal)	Johan Rudolph Thorbecke (Thorbecke III)
Johan Herman Geertsema	Johan Herman; Geertsema (1816–1908)	6 July 1872 – 27 August 1874	Independent; Liberal (Classical Liberal)	Gerrit de Vries (De Vries–Fransen van de Putte)
Jan Heemskerk	Dr. Jan Heemskerk (Prime Minister) (1818–1897)	27 August 1874 – 3 November 1877	Independent; Conservative (Liberal Conservative)	Jan Heemskerk (Heemskerk–Van Lynden van Sandenburg)
Jan Kappeyne van de Coppello	Jan Kappeyne van de Coppello (Prime Minister) (1822–1895)	3 November 1877 – 20 August 1879	Independent; Liberal (Classical Liberal)	Jan Kappeyne van de Coppello (Kappeyne van de Coppello)
Willem Six	Jonkheer; Willem Six (1829–1908)	20 August 1879 – 10 February 1882^{[Res]}	Independent; Liberal (Conservative Liberal)	Theo van Lynden van Sandenburg (Van Lynden van Sandenburg)
Cornelis Pijnacker Hordijk	Cornelis Pijnacker Hordijk (1847–1908)	10 February 1882 – 23 April 1883	Independent; Liberal (Conservative Liberal)	Theo van Lynden van Sandenburg (Van Lynden van Sandenburg)
Jan Heemskerk	Dr. Jan Heemskerk (Prime Minister) (1818–1897)	23 April 1883 – 21 April 1888	Independent; Conservative (Liberal Conservative)	Jan Heemskerk (J. Heemskerk)
Aeneas Mackay Jr.	Baron; Aeneas Mackay Jr. (Prime Minister) (1838–1909)	21 April 1888 – 24 February 1890^{[Appt]}	Anti-Revolutionary Party	Aeneas Mackay (Mackay)
Alexander de Savornin Lohman	Jonkheer; Alexander de Savornin Lohman (1837–1924)	24 February 1890 – 21 August 1891	Anti-Revolutionary Party	Aeneas Mackay (Mackay)
Johannes Tak van Poortvliet	Johannes Tak van Poortvliet (1839–1904)	21 August 1891 – 9 May 1894	Liberal Union	Gijsbert van Tienhoven (Van Tienhoven)
Samuel van Houten	Samuel van Houten (1837–1930)	9 May 1894 – 27 July 1897	Independent; Liberal (Classical Liberal)	Joan Röell (Röell)
Hendrik Goeman Borgesius	Dr. Hendrik Goeman; Borgesius (1847–1917)	27 July 1897 – 1 August 1901	Liberal Union	Nicolaas Pierson (Pierson)
Abraham Kuyper	Dr. Abraham Kuyper (Prime Minister) (1837–1920)	1 August 1901 – 17 August 1905	Anti-Revolutionary Party	Abraham Kuyper (Kuyper)
Pieter Rink	Pieter Rink (1851–1941)	17 August 1905 – 10 February 1908	Liberal Union	Theo de Meester (De Meester)
Theo Heemskerk	Theo Heemskerk (Prime Minister) (1852–1932)	11 February 1908 – 29 August 1913	Anti-Revolutionary Party	Theo Heemskerk (T. Heemskerk)
Pieter Cort van der Linden	Dr. Pieter Cort van der Linden (Prime Minister) (1846–1935)	29 August 1913 – 9 September 1918	Independent; Liberal (Classical Liberal)	Pieter Cort van der Linden (Cort van der Linden)
Charles Ruijs de Beerenbrouck	Jonkheer; Charles Ruijs de Beerenbrouck (Prime Minister) (1873–1936)	9 September 1918 – 1 January 1923	Roman Catholic; State Party	Charles Ruijs de Beerenbrouck (Ruijs de Beerenbrouck I • II)
Minister of the Interior and Agriculture		Term of office	Party	Prime Minister (Cabinet)
Charles Ruijs de Beerenbrouck	Jonkheer; Charles Ruijs de Beerenbrouck (Prime Minister) (1869–1944)	1 January 1923 – 4 August 1925	Roman Catholic; State Party	Charles Ruijs de Beerenbrouck (Ruijs de Beerenbrouck II)
Dirk Jan de Geer	Jonkheer; Dirk Jan de Geer (1870–1960)	4 August 1925 – 8 March 1926	Christian Historical Union	Hendrikus Colijn (Colijn I)
Jan Kan	Jan Kan (1873–1947)	8 March 1926 – 10 August 1929	Independent; Liberal (Social Liberal)	Dirk Jan de Geer (De Geer I)
Charles Ruijs de Beerenbrouck	Jonkheer; Charles Ruijs de Beerenbrouck (Prime Minister) (1869–1944)	10 August 1929 – 1 May 1932	Roman Catholic; State Party	Charles Ruijs de Beerenbrouck (Ruijs de Beerenbrouck III)
Charles Ruijs de Beerenbrouck	Jonkheer; Charles Ruijs de Beerenbrouck (Prime Minister) (1873–1936)	1 May 1932 – 26 May 1933	Roman Catholic; State Party	Charles Ruijs de Beerenbrouck (Ruijs de Beerenbrouck III)
Jacob Adriaan de Wilde	Jacob Adriaan de Wilde (1879–1956)	26 May 1933 – 24 June 1937	Anti-Revolutionary; Party	Hendrikus Colijn (Colijn II • III)
Hendrik van Boeijen	Hendrik van Boeijen (also Minister of General; Affairs 1940–1944) (1889–1947)	24 June 1937 – 31 May 1944^{[Res]}	Christian; Historical Union	Hendrikus Colijn (Colijn IV • V)
Hendrik van Boeijen	Hendrik van Boeijen (also Minister of General; Affairs 1940–1944) (1889–1947)	24 June 1937 – 31 May 1944^{[Res]}	Christian; Historical Union	Dirk Jan de Geer (De Geer II)
Hendrik van Boeijen	Hendrik van Boeijen (also Minister of General; Affairs 1940–1944) (1889–1947)	24 June 1937 – 31 May 1944^{[Res]}	Christian; Historical Union	Pieter Sjoerds Gerbrandy (Gerbrandy I)
Hendrik van Boeijen	Hendrik van Boeijen (also Minister of General; Affairs 1940–1944) (1889–1947)	24 June 1937 – 31 May 1944^{[Res]}	Christian; Historical Union	Pieter Sjoerds Gerbrandy (Gerbrandy II)
Jaap Burger	Jaap Burger (1904–1986)	31 May 1944 – 27 January 1945^{[Res]}	Social Democratic; Workers' Party	Pieter Sjoerds Gerbrandy (Gerbrandy II)
Hendrik van Boeijen	Hendrik van Boeijen (Minister of General Affairs) (1889–1947)	27 January 1945 – 23 February 1945^{[Ad Interim]}	Christian; Historical Union	Pieter Sjoerds Gerbrandy (Gerbrandy II)

=== Since 1945 ===
Minister of the Interior		Term of office	Party	Prime Minister (Cabinet)
Louis Beel	Louis Beel (Prime Minister; 1946–1947) (1902–1977)	23 February 1945 – 15 September 1947	Roman Catholic; State Party	Pieter Sjoerds; Gerbrandy (Gerbrandy III)
Louis Beel	Louis Beel (Prime Minister; 1946–1947) (1902–1977)	23 February 1945 – 15 September 1947	Catholic; People's Party	Willem; Schermerhorn (Schermerhorn– Drees)
Louis Beel	Louis Beel (Prime Minister; 1946–1947) (1902–1977)	23 February 1945 – 15 September 1947	Catholic; People's Party	Louis Beel (Beel I)
Piet Witteman	Piet Witteman (1892–1972)	15 September 1947 – 7 August 1948	Catholic; People's Party	Louis Beel (Beel I)
Johan van Maarseveen	Johan van Maarseveen (1894–1951)	7 August 1948 – 15 June 1949^{[App]}	Catholic; People's Party	Willem Drees (Drees– Van Schaik)
Josef van Schaik	Josef van Schaik (1882–1962)^{[Deputy]}	15 June 1949 – 20 September 1949^{[Ad interim]} ^{[Minister]}	Catholic; People's Party	Willem Drees (Drees– Van Schaik)
Frans Teulings	Frans Teulings (1891–1966)	20 September 1949 – 15 March 1951	Catholic; People's Party	Willem Drees (Drees– Van Schaik)
Johan van Maarseveen	Johan van Maarseveen (1894–1951)	15 March 1951 – 18 November 1951^{[Died]}	Catholic; People's Party	Willem Drees (Drees I)
Frans Teulings	Frans Teulings (1891–1966)^{[Deputy]}	18 November 1951 – 6 December 1951^{[Ad Interim]} ^{[Minister]}	Catholic; People's Party	Willem Drees (Drees I)
Louis Beel	Louis Beel (1902–1977)^{[Deputy]}	6 December 1951 – 7 July 1956^{[App]}	Catholic; People's Party	Willem Drees (Drees I)
Louis Beel	Louis Beel (1902–1977)^{[Deputy]}	6 December 1951 – 7 July 1956^{[App]}	Catholic; People's Party	Willem Drees (Drees II)
Julius Christiaan van Oven	Julius Christiaan van Oven (1881–1963)	7 July 1956 – 13 October 1956^{[Acting]} ^{[Minister]}	Labour Party	Willem Drees (Drees II)
Ko Suurhoff	Ko Suurhoff (1905–1967)	13 October 1956 – 29 October 1956^{[Ad Interim]} ^{[Minister]}	Labour Party	Willem Drees (Drees III)
Minister of the Interior, Property and Public Organisations		Term of office	Party	Prime Minister (Cabinet)
Teun Struycken	Teun Struycken (1906–1977)^{[Deputy]}	29 October 1956 – 19 May 1959^{[Minister]}	Catholic; People's Party	Willem Drees (Drees III)
Teun Struycken	Teun Struycken (1906–1977)^{[Deputy]}	29 October 1956 – 19 May 1959^{[Minister]}	Catholic; People's Party	Louis Beel (Beel II)
Minister of the Interior		Term of office	Party	Prime Minister (Cabinet)
Edzo Toxopeus	Edzo Toxopeus (1918–2009)	19 May 1959 – 14 April 1965	People's Party for Freedom and Democracy	Jan de Quay (De Quay)
Edzo Toxopeus	Edzo Toxopeus (1918–2009)	19 May 1959 – 14 April 1965	People's Party for Freedom and Democracy	Victor Marijnen (Marijnen)
Jan Smallenbroek	Jan Smallenbroek (1909–1974)	14 April 1965 – 31 August 1966^{[Res]}	Anti-Revolutionary; Party	Jo Cals (Cals)
Ivo Samkalden	Ivo Samkalden (1912–1995)	31 August 1966 – 5 September 1966^{[Ad Interim]} ^{[Minister]}	Labour Party	Jo Cals (Cals)
Koos Verdam	Koos Verdam (1915–1998)	5 September 1966 – 5 April 1967	Anti-Revolutionary; Party	Jo Cals (Cals)
Koos Verdam	Koos Verdam (1915–1998)	5 September 1966 – 5 April 1967	Anti-Revolutionary; Party	Jelle Zijlstra (Zijlstra)
Henk Beernink	Henk Beernink (1910–1979)	5 April 1967 – 6 July 1971	Christian; Historical Union	Piet de Jong (De Jong)
Molly Geertsema	Molly Geertsema (1918–1991)^{[Deputy]}	6 July 1971 – 11 May 1973	People's Party for Freedom and Democracy	Barend Biesheuvel (Biesheuvel I • II)
Gaius de Gaay Fortman	Gaius de Gaay Fortman (1911–1997)^{[Deputy]}	11 May 1973 – 19 December 1977^{[Minister]} ^{[Minister]}	Anti-Revolutionary; Party	Joop den Uyl (Den Uyl)
Hans Wiegel	Hans Wiegel (1941–2025)^{[Deputy]}	19 December 1977 – 11 September 1981	People's Party for Freedom and Democracy	Dries van Agt (Van Agt I)
Ed van Thijn	Ed van Thijn (1934–2021)	11 September 1981 – 29 May 1982^{[Res]}	Labour Party	Dries van Agt (Van Agt II)
Max Rood	Max Rood (1927–2001)	29 May 1982 – 4 November 1982	Democrats 66	Dries van Agt (Van Agt III)
Koos Rietkerk	Koos Rietkerk (1927–1986)	4 November 1982 – 20 February 1986^{[Died]}	People's Party for Freedom and Democracy	Ruud Lubbers (Lubbers I)
Frits Korthals Altes	Frits; Korthals Altes (1931–2025)	20 February 1986 – 12 March 1986^{[Ad Interim]} ^{[Minister]}	People's Party for Freedom and Democracy	Ruud Lubbers (Lubbers I)
Rudolf de Korte	Rudolf de Korte (1936–2020)	12 March 1986 – 14 July 1986	People's Party for Freedom and Democracy	Ruud Lubbers (Lubbers I)
Kees van Dijk	Kees van Dijk (1931–2008)	14 July 1986 – 26 January 1987^{[Note]}	Christian; Democratic; Appeal	Ruud Lubbers (Lubbers II)
Frits Korthals Altes	Frits; Korthals Altes (1931–2025)	26 January 1987 – 3 February 1987^{[Ad Interim]} ^{[Minister]}	People's Party for Freedom and Democracy	Ruud Lubbers (Lubbers II)
Jan de Koning	Jan de Koning (1926–1994)	3 February 1987 – 6 May 1987^{[Acting]}	Christian; Democratic; Appeal	Ruud Lubbers (Lubbers II)
Kees van Dijk	Kees van Dijk (1931–2008)	6 May 1987 – 7 November 1989	Christian; Democratic; Appeal	Ruud Lubbers (Lubbers II)
Ien Dales	Ien Dales (1931–1994)	7 November 1989 – 10 January 1994^{[Died]}	Labour Party	Ruud Lubbers (Lubbers III)
Ernst Hirsch Ballin	Ernst; Hirsch Ballin (born 1950)	10 January 1994 – 18 January 1994^{[Ad Interim]} ^{[Minister]}	Christian; Democratic; Appeal	Ruud Lubbers (Lubbers III)
Ed van Thijn	Ed van Thijn (1934–2021)	18 January 1994 – 27 May 1994^{[Res]}	Labour Party	Ruud Lubbers (Lubbers III)
Dieuwke de Graaff-Nauta	Dieuwke de Graaff-Nauta (1930–2008)	27 May 1994 – 22 August 1994	Christian; Democratic; Appeal	Ruud Lubbers (Lubbers III)
Hans Dijkstal	Hans Dijkstal (1943–2010)^{[Deputy]}	22 August 1994 – 3 August 1998	People's Party for Freedom and Democracy	Wim Kok (Kok I)
Minister of the Interior and Kingdom Relations		Term of office	Party	Prime Minister (Cabinet)
Bram Peper	Bram Peper (1940–2022)	3 August 1998 – 13 March 2000^{[Res]}	Labour Party	Wim Kok (Kok II)
Roger van Boxtel	Roger van Boxtel (born 1954)	13 March 2000 – 24 March 2000^{[Ad Interim]}	Democrats 66	Wim Kok (Kok II)
Klaas de Vries	Klaas de Vries (born 1943)	24 March 2000 – 22 July 2002	Labour Party	Wim Kok (Kok II)
Johan Remkes	Johan Remkes (born 1951)^{[Deputy]}	22 July 2002 – 22 February 2007	People's Party for Freedom and Democracy	Jan Peter; Balkenende (Balkenende; I • II • III)
Guusje ter Horst	Guusje ter Horst (born 1952)	22 February 2007 – 23 February 2010^{[Res]}	Labour Party	Jan Peter; Balkenende (Balkenende IV)
Ernst Hirsch Ballin	Ernst; Hirsch Ballin (born 1950)	23 February 2010 – 14 October 2010	Christian; Democratic; Appeal	Jan Peter; Balkenende (Balkenende IV)
Piet Hein Donner	Piet Hein Donner (born 1948)	14 October 2010 – 16 December 2011^{[App]}	Christian; Democratic; Appeal	Mark Rutte (Rutte I)
Liesbeth Spies	Liesbeth Spies (born 1966)	16 December 2011 – 5 November 2012	Christian; Democratic; Appeal	Mark Rutte (Rutte I)
Ronald Plasterk	Ronald Plasterk (born 1957)	5 November 2012 – 29 June 2016^{[Note]}	Labour Party	Mark Rutte (Rutte II)
Ronald Plasterk	Stef Blok (born 1964)	29 June 2016 – 16 September 2016^{[Acting]}	People's Party for Freedom and Democracy	Mark Rutte (Rutte II)
Ronald Plasterk	Ronald Plasterk (born 1957)	16 September 2016 – 26 October 2017	Labour Party	Mark Rutte (Rutte II)
Kajsa Ollongren	Jonkvrouw; Kajsa Ollongren (born 1967)^{[Deputy]}	26 October 2017 – 1 November 2019^{[Note]}	Democrats 66	Mark Rutte (Rutte III)
Raymond Knops	Raymond Knops (born 1971)	1 November 2019 – 14 April 2020^{[Acting]}	Christian; Democratic; Appeal	Mark Rutte (Rutte III)
Kajsa Ollongren	Jonkvrouw; Kajsa Ollongren (born 1967)^{[Deputy]}	14 April 2020 – 10 January 2022	Democrats 66	Mark Rutte (Rutte III)
Hanke Bruins Slot	Hanke; Bruins Slot (born 1977)	10 January 2022 – 5 September 2023^{[App]}	Christian; Democratic; Appeal	Mark Rutte (Rutte IV)
Hugo de Jonge	Hugo de Jonge (born 1977)	5 September 2023 – 2 July 2024	Christian; Democratic; Appeal	Mark Rutte (Rutte IV)
Judith Uitermark	Judith; Uitermark (born 1971)	2 July 2024– 22 August 2025	New Social Contract	Dick Schoof (Schoof)
	Frank Rijkaart (born 1978)	5 September 2025 – 23 February 2026	Farmer– Citizen Movement	Dick Schoof (Schoof)
Pieter Heerma	Pieter Heerma (born 1977)	23 February 2026 – Incumbent	Christian; Democratic; Appeal	Rob Jetten (Jetten)

^{Resigned}
^{Ad interim}
^{Died in Office}
^{Medical leave of absence from 29 June 2016 until 16 September 2016}
^{Medical leave of absence from 1 November 2019 until 14 April 2020}
^{Deputy Prime Minister}
^{Deputy Prime Minister from 2 September 1952}
^{Deputy Prime Minister from 8 September 1977}
^{Deputy Prime Minister until 27 May 2003}
^{Minister without Portfolio for the Interior}
^{Minister of Justice}
^{Minister of Social Affairs and Health}
^{Minister of Justice from 22 December 1958}
^{Minister for Kingdom Relations}
^{Acting Minister of Justice from 8 September 1977}
^{Appointed as Minister of Colonial Affairs}
^{Appointed as Chairman of the Special State Commission}
^{Appointed as Vice-President of the Council of State}
^{Appointed as Minister of Foreign Affairs}

== List of ministers without portfolio ==
Minister without Portfolio		Portfolio(s)	Term of office	Party	Prime Minister (Cabinet)
Jaap Burger	Jaap Burger (1904–1986)	• Provisional; Governmental; Affairs	11 August 1943 – 31 May 1944^{[App]}	Social Democratic; Workers' Party	Pieter Sjoerds; Gerbrandy (Gerbrandy II)
Vacant
Josef van Schaik	Josef van Schaik (1882–1962)^{[Deputy]}	• Civil Reform • Decolonization; Policy	7 August 1948 – 15 March 1951	Catholic; People's Party	Willem Drees (Drees– Van Schaik)
Frans Teulings	Frans Teulings (1891–1966)^{[Deputy]}	• Civil Defence	15 March 1951 – 2 September 1952	Catholic; People's Party	Willem Drees (Drees I)
Guus Albregts	Dr. Guus Albregts (1900–1980)	• Public; Organisations • Small and Medium-sized; Businesses	15 March 1951 – 2 September 1952	Catholic; People's Party	Willem Drees (Drees I)
Ad de Bruijn	Ad de Bruijn (1887–1968)	• Public; Organisations	2 September 1952 – 13 October 1956	Catholic; People's Party	Willem Drees (Drees II)
Not in use (1956–1998)
Roger van Boxtel	Roger van Boxtel (born 1954)	• Urban Planning • Integration • Minorities	3 August 1998 – 22 July 2002	Democrats 66	Wim Kok (Kok II)
Not in use (2002–2003)
Thom de Graaf	Thom de Graaf (born 1957)^{[Deputy]}	• Civil Reform • Municipalities • Urban Planning • Kingdom; Relations	27 May 2003 – 23 March 2005^{[Res]}	Democrats 66	Jan Peter; Balkenende (Balkenende II)
Alexander Pechtold	Alexander Pechtold (born 1965)	• Civil Reform • Municipalities • Urban Planning • Kingdom; Relations	31 March 2005 – 3 July 2006^{[Res]}	Democrats 66	Jan Peter; Balkenende (Balkenende II)
Atzo Nicolaï	Atzo Nicolaï (1960–2020)	• Civil Reform • Municipalities • Urban Planning • Kingdom; Relations	7 July 2006 – 22 February 2007	People's Party for Freedom and Democracy	Jan Peter; Balkenende (Balkenende III)
Not in use (2007–2010)
Gerd Leers	Gerd Leers (born 1951)	• Immigration and Asylum	14 October 2010 – 16 December 2011	Christian; Democratic Appeal	Mark Rutte (Rutte I)
Gerd Leers	Gerd Leers (born 1951)	• Immigration and Asylum • Integration • Minorities	16 December 2011 – 5 November 2012	Christian; Democratic Appeal	Mark Rutte (Rutte I)
Stef Blok	Stef Blok (born 1964)	• State-owned; Businesses • Independent; Government; Agencies • Government; Buildings	5 November 2012 – 27 January 2017^{[App]}	People's Party for Freedom and Democracy	Mark Rutte (Rutte II)
Not in use (2017–2019)
Stientje van Veldhoven	Stientje van Veldhoven (born 1973)	• Environmental; Policy • Public Housing • Spatial Planning • Government; Buildings	1 November 2019 – 14 April 2020^{[Acting]}	Democrats 66	Mark Rutte (Rutte III)
Ank Bijleveld	Ank Bijleveld (born 1962)	• Intelligence and Security Service	1 November 2019 – 14 April 2020^{[Acting]}	Christian; Democratic Appeal	Mark Rutte (Rutte III)
Hugo de Jonge	Hugo de Jonge (born 1977)	• Public Housing • Spatial Planning	10 January 2022 – 2 July 2024	Christian; Democratic Appeal	Mark Rutte (Rutte IV)

^{Resigned}
^{Acting}
^{Deputy Prime Minister}
^{Appointed as Minister of the Interior}
^{Appointed as Minister of Security and Justice}

== List of state secretaries for the interior ==
State Secretary for the Interior		Portfolio(s)	Term of office	Party	Prime Minister (Cabinet)
Norbert Schmelzer	Norbert Schmelzer (1921–2008)	• Public; Organisations	29 October 1956 – 19 May 1959	Catholic; People's Party	Willem Drees (Drees III)
Norbert Schmelzer	Norbert Schmelzer (1921–2008)	• Public; Organisations	29 October 1956 – 19 May 1959	Catholic; People's Party	Louis Beel (Beel II)
Theo Bot	Theo Bot (1911–1984)	• Netherlands; New Guinea	23 November 1959 – 24 July 1963	Catholic; People's Party	Jan de Quay (De Quay)
Theo Westerhout	Theo Westerhout (1922–1987)	• Municipalities • Provinces	12 July 1965 – 22 November 1966	Labour Party	Jo Cals (Cals)
Chris van Veen	Chris van Veen (1922–2009)	• Municipalities • Provinces • Civil Service	10 May 1967 – 6 July 1971	Christian; Historical Union	Piet de Jong (De Jong)
Jan van Stuijvenberg	Jan van Stuijvenberg (born 1928)	• Municipalities • Civil Service	17 July 1971 – 21 July 1972^{[Res]}	Democratic; Socialists '70	Barend Biesheuvel (Biesheuvel I)
Wim Polak	Wim Polak (1924–1999)	• Municipalities • Civil Service	11 May 1973 – 1 May 1977^{[App]}	Labour Party	Joop den Uyl (Den Uyl)
Henk Koning	Henk Koning (1933–2016)	• Municipalities • Civil Service	28 December 1977 – 11 September 1981	People's Party for Freedom and Democracy	Dries van Agt (Van Agt I)
Saskia Stuiveling	Saskia Stuiveling (1945–2017)	• Municipalities	11 September 1981 – 29 May 1982^{[Res]}	Labour Party	Dries van Agt (Van Agt II)
Gerard van Leijenhorst	Gerard van Leijenhorst (1928–2001)	• Emergency; Management • Minorities	11 September 1981 – 4 November 1982	Christian; Democratic Appeal	Dries van Agt (Van Agt II)
Gerard van Leijenhorst	Gerard van Leijenhorst (1928–2001)	• Municipalities • Emergency; Management • Minorities	11 September 1981 – 4 November 1982	Christian; Democratic Appeal	Dries van Agt (Van Agt III)
Marius van Amelsvoort	Marius van Amelsvoort (1930–2006)	• Municipalities • Emergency; Services • Emergency; Management	8 November 1982 – 14 July 1986	Christian; Democratic Appeal	Ruud Lubbers (Lubbers I)
Dieuwke de Graaff-Nauta	Dieuwke de Graaff-Nauta (1930–2008)	• Municipalities • Emergency; Services • Emergency; Management • Regional; Languages	14 July 1986 – 27 May 1994^{[App]}	Christian; Democratic Appeal	Ruud Lubbers (Lubbers II • III)
	Tonny van de Vondervoort (born 1950)	• Municipalities	22 August 1994 – 3 August 1998	Labour Party	Wim Kok (Kok I)
Jacob Kohnstamm	Jacob Kohnstamm (born 1949)	• Public Security • Emergency; Services • Emergency; Management • Urban Planning	22 August 1994 – 3 August 1998	Democrats 66	Wim Kok (Kok I)
State Secretary for the Interior and Kingdom Relations		Portfolio(s)	Term of office	Party	Prime Minister (Cabinet)
	Gijs de Vries (born 1956)	• Kingdom; Relations • Emergency; Services • Emergency; Management • Regional; Languages	3 August 1998 – 22 July 2002	People's Party for Freedom and Democracy	Wim Kok (Kok II)
	Rob Hessing (born 1942)	• Public Security • Emergency; Services • Emergency; Management	22 July 2002 – 27 May 2003	Pim Fortuyn List	Jan Peter; Balkenende (Balkenende I)
Ank Bijleveld	Ank Bijleveld (born 1962)	• Kingdom; Relations • Municipalities • Provinces • Emergency; Management	22 February 2007 – 14 October 2010	Christian; Democratic Appeal	Jan Peter; Balkenende (Balkenende IV)
Raymond Knops	Raymond Knops (born 1971)	• Kingdom; Relations • Civil Service • Digital Government	26 October 2017 – 1 November 2019^{[App]}	Christian; Democratic Appeal	Mark Rutte (Rutte III)
Raymond Knops	Raymond Knops (born 1971)	• Kingdom; Relations • Civil Service • Digital Government	14 April 2020 – 10 January 2022	Christian; Democratic Appeal	Mark Rutte (Rutte III)
Alexandra van Huffelen	Alexandra van Huffelen (born 1968)	• Kingdom; Relations • Municipalities • Provinces • Digital Government	10 January 2022 – 2 July 2024	Democrats 66	Mark Rutte (Rutte IV)
Zsolt Szbó	Zsolt Szabó (born 1961)	• Kingdom; Relations • Digital Government	2 July 2024 – 2 June 2025	Party for Freedom	Dick Schoof (Schoof)
	Eddie van Marum (born 1968)	• Reparations for Groningen	2 July 2024 – 23 February 2026	Farmer– Citizen Movement	Dick Schoof (Schoof)

^{Resigned}
^{Appointed as Mayor of Amsterdam}
^{Appointed as acting Minister of the Interior and Kingdom Relations}

== See also ==
- Ministry of the Interior and Kingdom Relations
- List of ministers of kingdom relations of the Netherlands
