= Jacob Kohnstamm =

Dutch politician (born 1949)

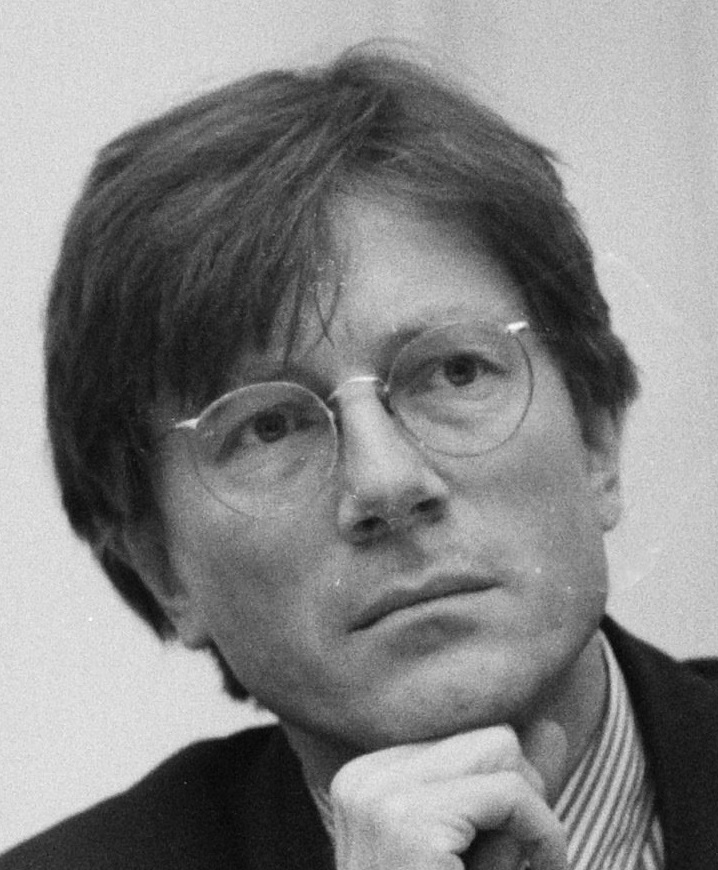
- Kohnstamm in 1989

Member of the Senate
- In office 8 June 1999 – 7 September 2004

State Secretary for the Interior
- In office 22 August 1994 – 3 August 1998 Serving with Tonny van de Vondervoort
- Prime Minister: Wim Kok
- Preceded by: Dieuwke de Graaff-Nauta
- Succeeded by: Gijs de Vries (as State Secretary for the Interior and Kingdom Relations)

Chairman of the Democrats 66
- In office 30 October 1982 – 20 May 1986
- Leader: See list: Laurens Jan Brinkhorst (1982) Maarten Engwirda (1982–1986) Hans van Mierlo (1986)
- Preceded by: Jan van Berkom
- Succeeded by: Olga Scheltema (ad interim)

Member of the House of Representatives
- In office 3 June 1986 – 22 August 1994
- In office 10 June 1981 – 16 September 1982

Personal details
- Born: Jacob Kohnstamm; 14 November 1949 (age 76) Wassenaar, Netherlands
- Party: Democrats 66 (since 1970)
- Parent: Max Kohnstamm (1914–2010) (father)
- Education: University of Amsterdam (Bachelor of Laws, Master of Laws)
- Occupation: Politician · civil servant · Jurist · Lawyer · Researcher · Corporate director · Nonprofit director · Media administrator · Lobbyist · Activist

Jacob Kohnstamm (born 14 November 1949) is a retired Dutch politician and jurist who was State Secretary for the Interior from 1994 to 1998. He is a member of the Democrats 66 (D66), which he chaired from 1982 to 1986.

== Biography ==
=== Studies and early career ===
Kohnstamm attended a gymnasium in The Hague from April 1962 until May 1968 and applied at the University of Amsterdam in June 1971, majoring in Law and obtaining a Bachelor of Laws degree in June 1973. He worked as a student researcher before graduating with a Master of Laws degree in July 1977. Kohnstamm worked as a criminal defense lawyer in Amsterdam from October 1977 until June 1981.

=== House of Representatives ===
Kohnstamm was elected to the House of Representatives after the 1981 general election, taking office on 10 June 1981 serving as a backbencher. After the 1982 general election Kohnstamm was not re-elected and he continued to serve until the end of the parliamentary term on 16 September 1982. Kohnstamm again worked as a criminal defense lawyer in Amsterdam from September 1982 until June 1986. Kohnstamm served as chairman of Democrats 66 from 30 October 1982 until 20 May 1986.

After the 1986 general election, Kohnstamm returned to the House of Representatives, taking office on 3 June 1986 serving as a frontbencher as spokesperson for the interior, justice, law enforcement, health, the civil service and abortion and deputy spokesperson for foreign affairs, European affairs and the Benelux Union. He also chaired the parliamentary committee for law enforcement and the parliamentary committee for the Ombudsman.

=== State Secretary for the Interior ===
After the 1994 general election, Kohnstamm was appointed as State Secretary for the Interior in the first Kok cabinet, taking office on 22 August 1994. He was tasked with public security, emergency services, emergency management and urban planning. In December 1997 Kohnstamm announced that he would not stand for the 1998 general election. Following the cabinet formation of 1998, Kohnstamm asked not to be considered for a post in the new cabinet; the first Kok cabinet was replaced by the second Kok cabinet on 3 August 1998.

=== Late career ===
Kohnstamm remained in active in national politics; he was elected to the Senate after the 1999 Senate election, taking office on 8 June. He served as spokesperson for foreign affairs, justice, health, European affairs, art and culture, and chaired the special parliamentary committee for the European Court of Justice. He left the Senate on 7 September 2004. He was the chair of the Dutch Data Protection Authority from 2004 to 2016. From 2016 tot 2021 he was the chair of the Euthanasia Review Committee. From 2021 to 2023 he chaired the Restitution Committee that gives recommendations and binding opinions concerning Nazi looted art. He also was chair of board of the International Chamber Music Festival Schiermonnikoog (2012-2021) and of the board of the foundation Forbidden Music Regained (2014-2021).

== Decorations ==
Honours
Ribbon bar	Honour	Country	Date	Comment
	Knight of the Order of Orange-Nassau	Netherlands	30 October 1998	

Party political offices
Preceded by Jan van Berkom	Chairman of the Democrats 66; 1982–1986	Succeeded by Olga Scheltema; Ad interim
Political offices
Preceded by Dieuwke de Graaff-Nauta	State Secretary for the Interior; 1994–1998; Served alongside: Tonny van de Vondervoort	Succeeded by Gijs de Vries as State Secretary for the Interior and Kingdom Relations
Non-profit organization positions
Unknown	Chairman of the Supervisory board of the Dutch Voluntary End of Life Association; 2000–2006	Unknown
Preceded by Bram Stemerdink	Chairman of the Supervisory board of the Verzetsmuseum; 2004–present	Incumbent
Media offices
Unknown	Chairman of the Supervisory board of the Humanist Broadcasting; 1999–2013	Succeeded by Magdeleen Sturm
