= Tonny van de Vondervoort =

Dutch politician (born 1950)

State Secretary for the Interior
- In office 22 August 1994 – 3 August 1998 Serving with Jacob Kohnstamm
- Minister: Hans Dijkstal
- Cabinet: Kok I
- Preceded by: Dieuwke de Graaff-Nauta
- Succeeded by: Gijs de Vries

Member of the Provincial Council of South Holland
- In office 17 March 2011 – 31 March 2015

Member of the Provincial Executive of South Holland
- In office 25 April 2007 – 15 April 2011
Acting mayoralties 2004‍–‍2014
Acting Mayor of Doetinchem
In office 19 August 2013 – 5 February 2014
Preceded by	Herman Kaiser
Succeeded by	Niels Joosten
Acting Mayor of Sliedrecht
In office 15 April 2011 – 27 November 2012
Preceded by	Martin Boevée
Succeeded by	Bram van Hemmen
Acting Mayor of Zaanstad
In office 15 April 2006 – 25 April 2007
Preceded by	Jan Mans
Succeeded by	Wim Dijkstra
Acting Mayor of Drechterland
In office 1 January 2004 – 15 April 2006
Preceded by	Gerard Broens
Succeeded by	Rob van der Riet

Alderwoman of Groningen
- In office 29 April 1986 – 21 August 1994
- Succeeded by: Tjerk Bruinsma

Member of the Municipal Council of Groningen
- In office 5 September 1978 – 21 August 1994

Personal details
- Born: 9 April 1950 (age 76) Broekland, Netherlands
- Party: Labour Party
- Children: 2
- Education: Enschede Social Academy
- Occupation: Politician; healthcare manager; consultant

Antonia Geertruida Maria "Tonny" van de Vondervoort (Dutch: [ˈtɔni vɑn də ˈvɔndərvoːrt]; born 9 April 1950) is a Dutch politician of the Labour Party. She began her political career as municipal councilor and alderwoman in Groningen (1978–1994), until she joined the first Kok cabinet (1994–1998) as State Secretary for the Interior. She later served on the Provincial Executive of South Holland and as acting mayor of Drechterland, Zaanstad, Sliedrecht, and Doetinchem. From 2014 to 2020, Van de Vondervoort was chair of GGD GHOR Netherlands, an association of public health and safety organizations.

== Early life and Groningen politics ==
Van de Vondervoort was born in 1950 in Broekland, located in the municipality of Raalte, and she was raised Roman Catholic. She attended the Enschede Social Academy until 1972, and she subsequently started her career as a coordinator at a play and parenting education foundation in Groningen. She became a member of the Labour Party in 1974. Van de Vondervoort entered the Municipal Council of Groningen in September 1978, and she became her party's parliamentary leader in May 1981. She was appointed alderwoman for education, culture, and emancipation in April 1986, and she defended the construction of the new post-modernist building of the Groninger Museum, located in a canal next to the city's railway station.

She became alderwoman for finances, personnel, and organization after the March 1990 municipal election, and she also served as deputy mayor starting in 1991. During her tenure, the Groningen Credit Bank, the municipal debt assistance office, incurred losses of ƒ60 million because of bad investments. Two aldermen directly responsible left the executive in 1992, while Van de Vondervoort received support from all coalition parties to stay on, in order to prevent a governance crisis. She was subsequently involved in the financial and administrative reorganization of the Groningen Credit Bank. Van de Vondervoort continued her predecessor's reorganization of the municipal bureaucracy, and she was forced to cut spending on amenities and municipal employees. She reached an agreement with unions on the working conditions of civil servants, in which the lowest-paid and older workers were mostly spared. The municipal energy and transportation companies and its auditors' office were privatized.

When she received another term as alderwoman for finances in 1994, she stated that she might not finish her four-term term if another position came along. Van de Vondervoort sat on several Labour Party expert committees on finances and on local and regional governance.

== First Kok cabinet and further career ==
She was sworn in as State Secretary for the Interior as part of the first Kok cabinet on 22 August 1994, serving alongside Jacob Kohnstamm of Democrats 66. Van de Vondervoort's portfolio included administrative reorganization and lower government finances. She weakened the Joint Arrangements Act, which her predecessor Dieuwke de Graaff-Nauta (CDA) had worked on, and she revised the Financial Relations Act. The governing coalition had committed in its agreement to continuing its predecessor's plans to establish "city provinces", containing the metropolitan areas of seven major cities. Van de Vondervoort had reservations about some of the proposed regions, but she did attempt to follow through on the creation of the Rotterdam city province. She received support on the latter from Minister Hans Dijkstal (VVD), when the plan was criticized by the Labour Party's parliamentary group. She withdrew the bill in 1996, when its provision to divide the municipality of Rotterdam into several municipalities was removed by the parliament through an amendment. Van de Vondervoort did bring about several other governmental reorganizations. The installation of the second Kok cabinet on 3 August 1998 marked the end of her term, and she was appointed Knight of the Order of Orange-Nassau on 30 October of that year.

She worked as a management consultant for Deloitte starting in 1999. She served as acting mayor of Drechterland between January 2004 and April 2006, when the municipality was merged with Venhuizen, and as acting mayor of Zaanstad between April 2006 and April 2007. Van de Vondervoort subsequently joined the Provincial Executive of South Holland, where she was responsible for society and healthcare. She lived in Alphen aan den Rijn at the time, and she had two children. She was elected to the Provincial Council of South Holland in March 2011 as lead candidate. Van de Vondervoort stepped down from the provincial executive shortly before the end of her term in April 2011, when she was appointed acting mayor of Sliedrecht by Queen's commissioner Jan Franssen. Her term ended in November 2012, and she served as acting mayor of Doetinchem between August 2013 and February 2014. She said that she preferred the flexibility of her temporary positions and had no desire to take on a full six-year term. Van de Vondervoort left the provincial council after the March 2015 provincial election.

From 2014 to 2020, she headed GGD GHOR Netherlands, also known as the Association of Regional Public Health Services and Regional Medical Emergency Preparedness and Planning Offices, as chair. Previously, she also served as vice chair of the executive board of the Groningen State University of Applied Sciences and as vice chair of the Council for Public Administration (1999–2001).

== Electoral history ==
Electoral history of Tonny van de Vondervoort
Year	Body	Party	Pos.	Votes	Result		Ref.
Year	Body	Party	Pos.	Votes	Party seats	Individual	Ref.
1978	Municipal Council of Groningen	Labour Party	15	79	16 / 39	Won	
1982	Municipal Council of Groningen	Labour Party	5	697	15 / 39	Won	
1986	Municipal Council of Groningen	Labour Party	4	2,358	18 / 39	Won	
1986	Municipal Council of Groningen	Labour Party	3		18 / 39	Won	
1990	Municipal Council of Groningen	Labour Party	2		11 / 39	Won	
2011	Provincial Council of South Holland	Labour Party	1	133,867	10 / 55	Won	

Political offices
Preceded by Dieuwke de Graaff-Nauta	State Secretary for the Interior; 1994–1998; Served alongside: Jacob Kohnstamm	Succeeded by Gijs de Vries
