= Gilles de Kerchove =

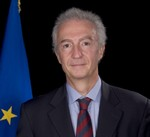
Gilles de Kerchove

Gilles de Kerchove d'Ousselghem (born 3 October 1956 in Uccle (Ukkel), Belgium) is a Belgian senior European Union official. He was director in the general directorate of Justice and Home Affairs (JHA) in the General Secretariat of the Council of the European Union from 1995 to 2007; he has since been appointed as EU Counter-terrorism Coordinator, succeeding Gijs de Vries.

== Biography ==
He obtained his law degree at the University of Louvain (UCLouvain) in 1979, later followed by a Masters in Law at Yale Law School in 1984.

He joined the European Commission in 1985 as an administrator in Directorate General IV for Competition. From 1986 to 1995, he worked for the Belgian government, as chief of staff of the deputy prime minister and various ministries.

During his time in office as director in the JHA sector, he had a central role in the negotiations for Eurojust and the European arrest warrant. Since 2007, he holds the office of EU Counter-Terrorism Coordinator. He was also Deputy Secretary of the Convention which drafted the Charter of Fundamental Rights of the European Union from 1999 to 2000.

In addition to his administrative duties, he is also a lecturer in law at several universities in Belgium, particularly at the University of Louvain (UCLouvain) in Louvain-la-Neuve, at Saint-Louis University, Brussels and the Université libre de Bruxelles (Brussels).

In 1979 he married Anne del Marmol (15 April 1956) and has three children: Arnaud (1984), Thomas (1987) and Antoine (1988).

== Political digital agenda ==
Since 2015 he is fighting encryption and demands backdoors.
