= Dieuwke de Graaff-Nauta =

Dutch politician

Her Excellency Dieuwke de Graaff-Nauta
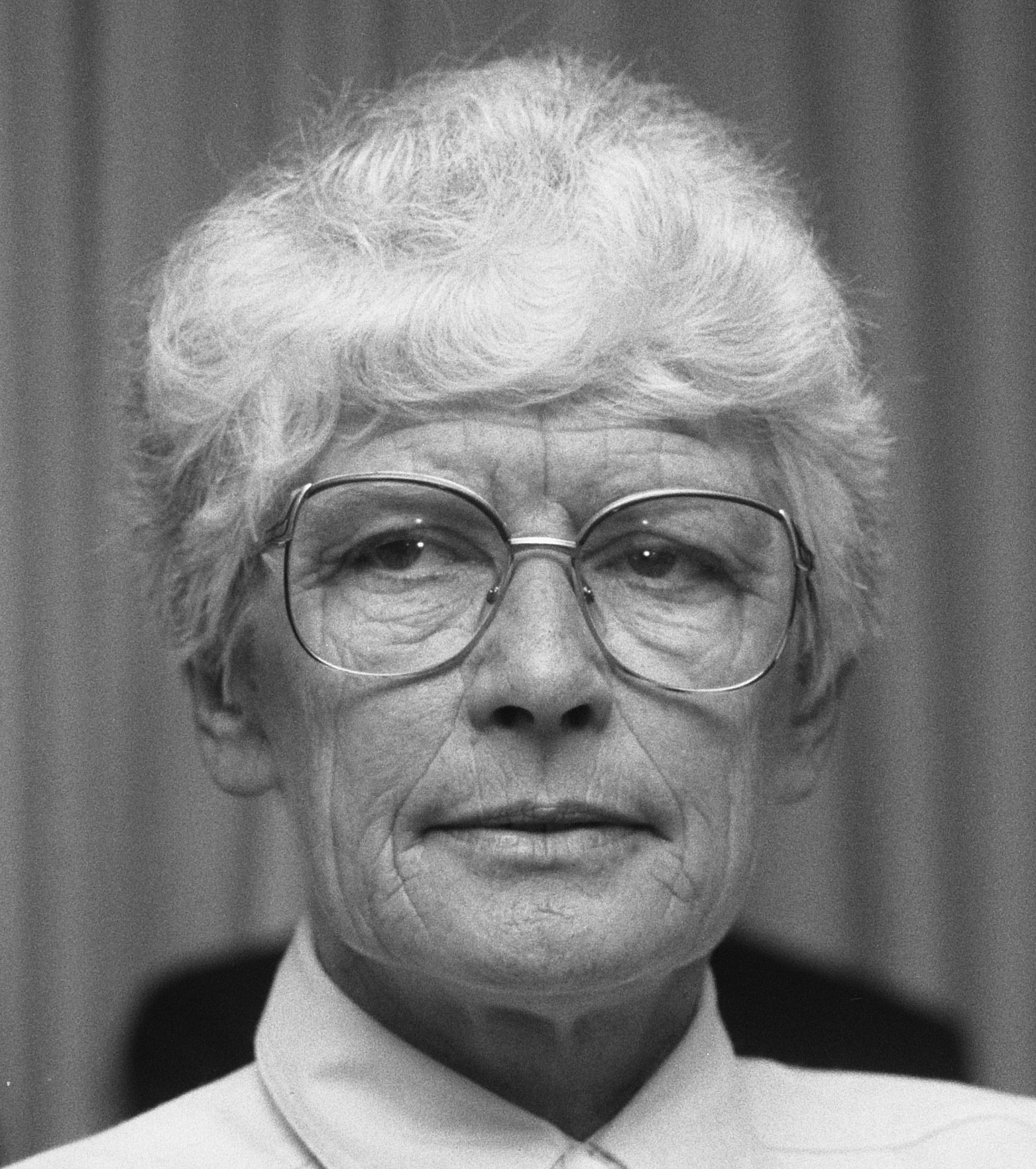
- Dieuwke de Graaff-Nauta in 1989

Minister of the Interior
- In office 27 May 1994 – 22 August 1994
- Prime Minister: Ruud Lubbers
- Preceded by: Ed van Thijn
- Succeeded by: Hans Dijkstal

State Secretary for the Interior
- In office 14 July 1986 – 27 May 1994
- Prime Minister: Ruud Lubbers
- Preceded by: Marius van Amelsvoort
- Succeeded by: Tonny van de Vondervoort; Jacob Kohnstamm

Personal details
- Born: Dieuwke IJtje Willemke Nauta; 22 May 1930 Sneek, Netherlands
- Died: 10 June 2008 (aged 78) Sneek, Netherlands
- Party: Christian Democratic Appeal (from 1980)
- Other political affiliations: Christian Historical Union (until 1980)
- Relatives: Lolle Nauta (brother)
- Occupation: Politician · Teacher

Dieuwke IJtje Willemke de Graaff-Nauta (22 May 1930 – 10 June 2008) was a Dutch politician of the Christian Democratic Appeal (CDA) party and teacher.

De Graaff-Nauta served as member of the States of Friesland between 6 June 1962 and 14 July 1986. She was part of the executive of the province from 7 June 1982 to 14 July 1986. De Graaff-Nauta subsequently became active on the national level, where she served as state secretary for Interior between 14 July 1986 and 27 May 1994. She then became Minister and served until 22 August 1994.

On the local level she was member of the municipal council of Sneek from 6 September 1966 to 4 July 1978. Between 1 September 1970 and 7 June 1978 she concurrently served as alderman.

== Decorations ==
Honours
Ribbon bar	Honour	Country	Date	Comment
	Commander of the Order of Orange-Nassau	Netherlands	8 October 1994	

Political offices
Preceded by Marius van Amelsvoort	State Secretary for the Interior; 1986–1994	Succeeded by Tonny van de Vondervoort
Preceded by Marius van Amelsvoort	State Secretary for the Interior; 1986–1994	Succeeded by Jacob Kohnstamm
Preceded by Ed van Thijn	Minister of the Interior; 1994	Succeeded by Hans Dijkstal
