= First Kok cabinet =

Cabinet of the Netherlands, 1994 to 1998

First Kok cabinet First Purple cabinet
- Cabinet of the Netherlands

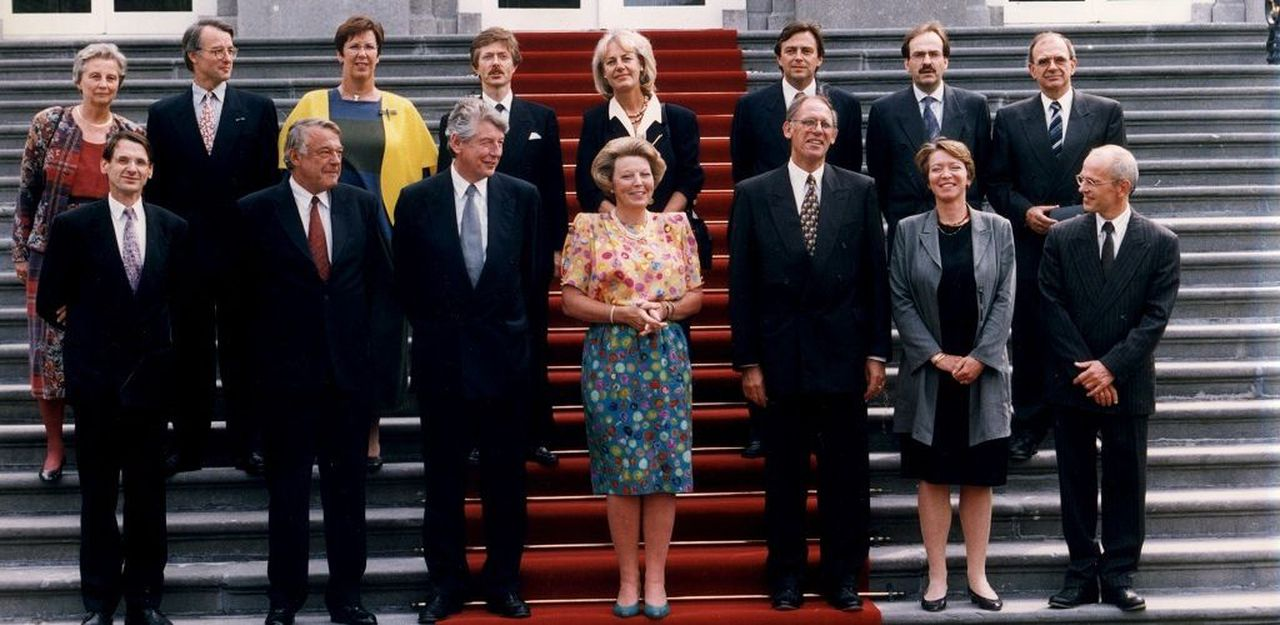
- The installation of the first Kok cabinet on 22 August 1994
- Date formed: 22 August 1994
- Date dissolved: 3 August 1998 (Demissionary from 6 May 1998)

People and organisations
- Head of state: Queen Beatrix
- Head of government: Wim Kok
- Deputy head of government: Hans Dijkstal; Hans van Mierlo
- No. of ministers: 14
- Member party: Labour Party (PvdA); People's Party for Freedom and Democracy (VVD); Democrats 66 (D66)
- Status in legislature: Centrist majority grand coalition

History
- Election: 1994 election
- Outgoing election: 1998 election
- Legislature terms: 1994–1998
- Incoming formation: 1994 formation
- Outgoing formation: 1998 formation
- Predecessor: Third Lubbers cabinet
- Successor: Second Kok cabinet

The first Kok cabinet, also called the first Purple cabinet was the executive branch of the Dutch government from 22 August 1994 until 3 August 1998. The cabinet was formed by the social-democratic Labour Party (PvdA), the conservative-liberal People's Party for Freedom and Democracy (VVD), and the social-liberal Democrats 66 after the election of 1994. The cabinet was a centrist grand coalition and had a substantial majority in the House of Representatives with Labour Leader Wim Kok serving as Prime Minister. Prominent Liberal politician Hans Dijkstal served as Deputy Prime Minister and Minister of the Interior, while Progressive-Liberal Leader Hans van Mierlo served as Deputy Prime Minister and Minister of Foreign Affairs.

The cabinet served during the economic expansion of the 1990s. Domestically, it was able to implement several major social reforms such as legalizing euthanasia and had to deal with the fallout of the El Al Flight 1862 crash. Internationally, the signing of the Treaty of Amsterdam took place, but it also had to deal with several crises such as the Bosnian War. The cabinet suffered no major internal conflicts, completing its entire term, and was succeeded by a continuation of the coalition in the second Kok cabinet following the election of 1998.

== Formation ==
Composition of the cabinet in relation to the rest of the legislature

After the election on 3 May 1994 the Labour Party (PvdA) of Wim Kok was the winner of the election despite losing 12 seats and now had a total of 37 seats. The Christian Democratic Appeal of incumbent Prime Minister Ruud Lubbers who had announced his retirement from national politics earlier was succeeded as Leader of the Christian Democratic Appeal by the Parliamentary leader of the Christian Democratic Appeal in the House of Representatives Elco Brinkman, a former Minister of Welfare, Health and Culture on 29 January 1994, under the new leadership they lost 20 seats and now had 34 seats. The Democrats 66 of Hans van Mierlo was the biggest winner gaining 12 new seats and now had a total of 24 seats. The People's Party for Freedom and Democracy under Frits Bolkestein were the other big winner, gaining 9 new seats had a total of 31 seats in the House of Representatives.

On 6 May 1994 Queen Beatrix appointed President of the Senate Herman Tjeenk Willink (PvdA) as Informateur to start the cabinet formation process. After a first round of talks the Labour Party, the People's Party for Freedom and Democracy and the Democrats 66 agreed to start negotiation talks. The first round of negotiations were troubled by objections from the Leader of the People's Party for Freedom and Democracy Frits Bolkenstein, in the end an agreement was reached to form a coalition. On 14 May 1994 Queen Beatrix appointed President of the Association of Netherlands Municipalities Klaas de Vries (PvdA), a former Member of the House of Representatives and Gijs van Aardenne (VVD), a former Deputy Prime Minister and Minister of Economic Affairs and Senator Jan Vis (D66), a professor of Constitutional law at the University of Groningen as Informateurs. On 3 June 1994 party leaders Wim Kok (PvdA), Frits Bolkenstein (VVD) and Hans van Mierlo (D66) reached an agreement to begin the cabinet formation. The final cabinet formation negotiations were also troubled by new objections from Frits Bolkenstein about a stronger integration policy and on 26 June 1994 negotiations between the parties failed to form a cabinet.

On 27 June 1994 Queen Beatrix reappointed Herman Tjeenk Willink as Informateur to look at the possibility of the Christian Democratic Appeal joining the Labour Party and the Democrats 66 in a coalition but objections from Democrats 66 halted that. On 6 July 1994 Queen Beatrix appointed Wim Kok as Informateur to write an open coalition proposal with the possibility of other parties to join the agreement. On 29 July 1994 the Labour Party, the People's Party for Freedom and Democracy and the Democrats 66 finally agreed to form a cabinet and Queen Beatrix appointed Wim Kok as Formateur that same day and tasked him with forming a new cabinet. On 22 August 1994 the cabinet formation was completed and the First Kok cabinet was installed with Wim Kok as Prime Minister and with Hans Dijkstal and Hans van Mierlo as Deputy Prime Ministers.

On 16 August 1994 shortly before the cabinet formation was completed Elco Brinkman who had only been the Leader of the Christian Democratic Appeal since 29 January 1994 stepped down following the disappointing election results and his inability to join the new cabinet, he was succeeded by Member of the House of Representatives Enneüs Heerma, the former State Secretary for Housing, Spatial Planning and the Environment.

== Term ==
The main aim of the cabinet under the lead of Wim Kok was to create employment. Gross domestic product (GDP) growth had been erratic in recent years. The aim of the cabinet was to increase the influence of markets in the economy, with policies of tax reduction, economizing and trying to keep people out of the social care by supporting employment. Large infrastructural projects were started. Another aim was to make an end to the enormous debt of the Dutch government.

The Treaty of Amsterdam was signed during this cabinet. The Srebrenica massacre occurred under the responsibility of this government, which led later to the fall of the Second Kok cabinet.

The cabinet started processes of liberalization which were completed by the same coalition in the following cabinet: the legalization of prostitution in 2000, same-sex marriage in 2001 and Euthanasia in 2002.

This cabinet was the last to serve a full term until the Second Rutte cabinet from 2012 to 2017. Five of the following cabinets resigned and one was a temporary caretaker cabinet.

=== Changes ===
On 28 June 1996, State Secretary for Social Affairs and Employment Robin Linschoten (VVD) resigned after a majority of the House of Representatives indicated that they had lost confidence in his ability to remain in office after a critical parliamentary inquiry into his handling of several social security issues was released. On 2 July 1996, Amsterdam alderman Frank de Grave (VVD), a former Member of the House of Representatives was appointed as his successor.

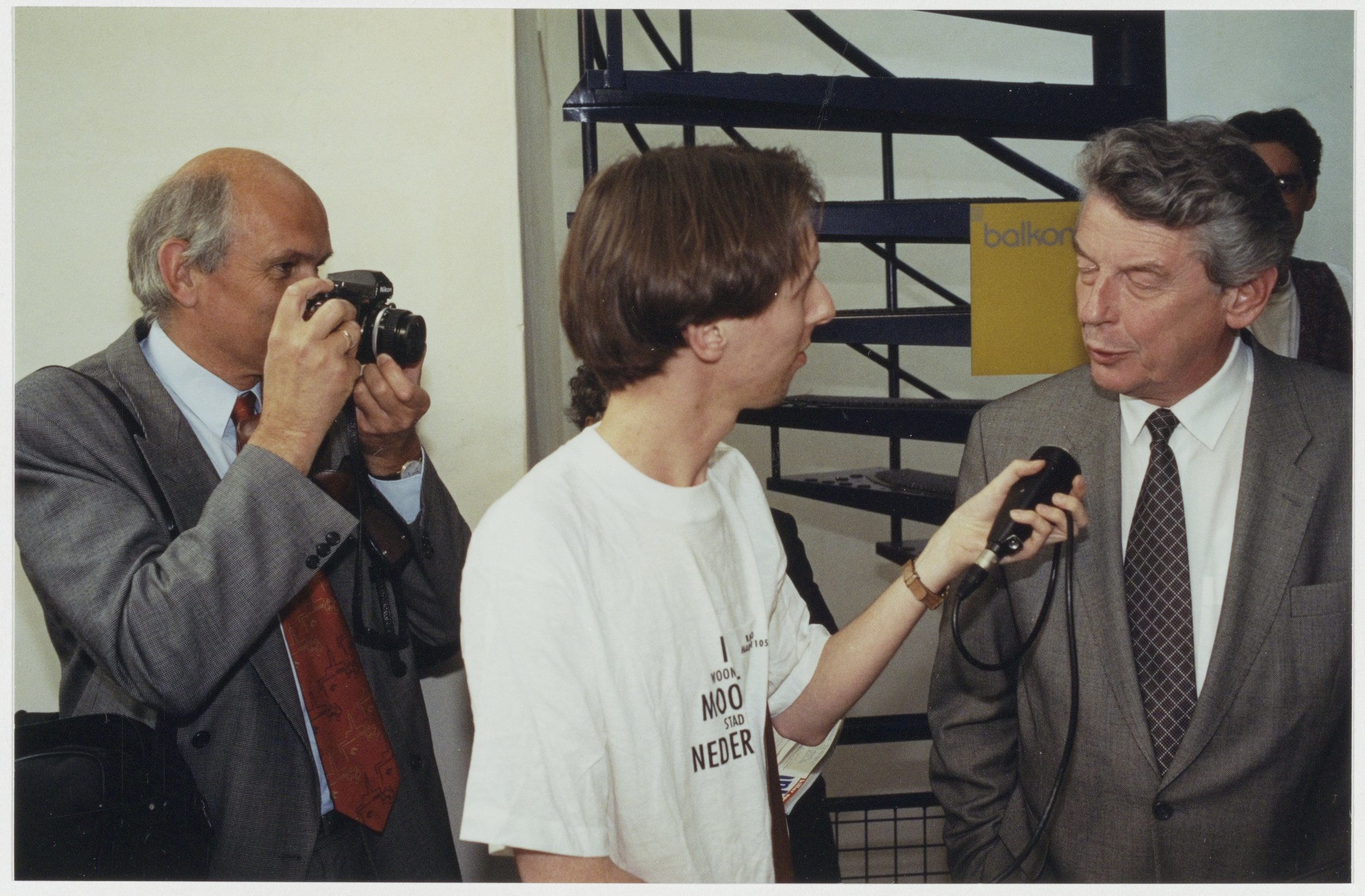
Mayor of Haarlem Jaap Pop and Prime Minister Wim Kok at a Labour party conference in Haarlem on 1 May 1995.

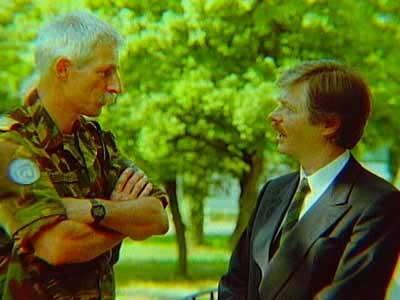
Commandant of Dutchbat Lieutenant colonel Thom Karremans and Minister of Defence Joris Voorhoeve in Zagreb days before the Srebrenica massacre in July 1995.

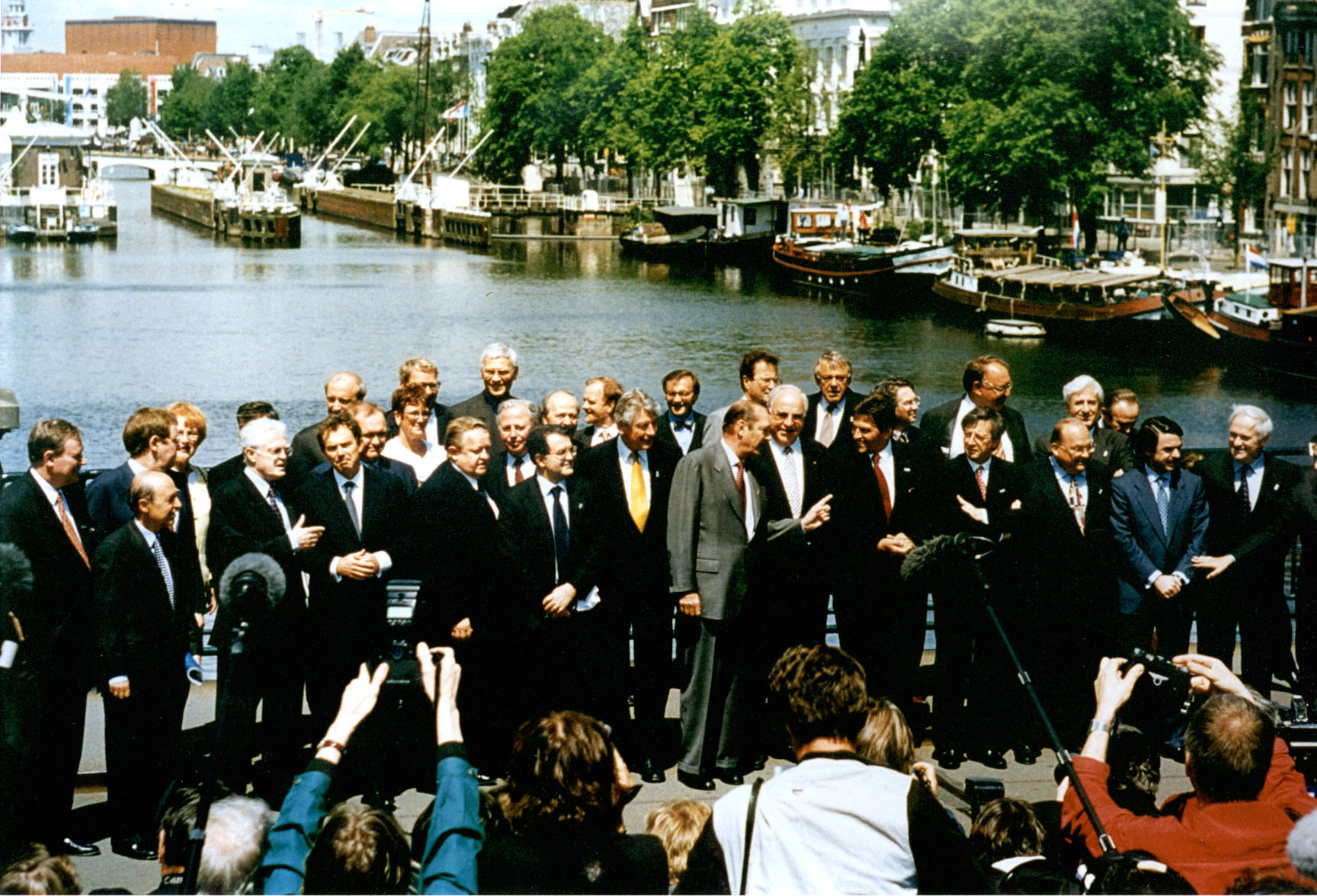
European Leaders before the signing of the Treaty of Amsterdam on 2 October 1997.

== Cabinet members ==
Ministers		Title/Ministry/Portfolio(s)			Term of office	Party
Wim Kok	Wim Kok (1938–2018)	Prime Minister	General Affairs		22 August 1994 – 22 July 2002^{[Continued]}	Labour Party
Hans Dijkstal	Hans Dijkstal (1943–2010)	Deputy; Prime Minister	Interior		22 August 1994 – 3 August 1998	People's Party for Freedom and Democracy
Hans Dijkstal	Hans Dijkstal (1943–2010)	Minister	Interior		22 August 1994 – 3 August 1998	People's Party for Freedom and Democracy
Hans van Mierlo	Hans van Mierlo (1931–2010)	Deputy; Prime Minister	Foreign Affairs		22 August 1994 – 3 August 1998	Democrats 66
Hans van Mierlo	Hans van Mierlo (1931–2010)	Minister	Foreign Affairs		22 August 1994 – 3 August 1998	Democrats 66
Gerrit Zalm	Gerrit Zalm (born 1952)	Minister	Finance		22 August 1994 – 4 June 1996^{[Note]}	People's Party for Freedom and Democracy
Hans Wijers	Dr. Hans Wijers (born 1951)	Minister	Finance		4 June 1996 – 26 June 1996^{[Acting]}	Democrats 66
Gerrit Zalm	Gerrit Zalm (born 1952)	Minister	Finance		26 June 1996 – 22 July 2002^{[Continued]}	People's Party for Freedom and Democracy
Winnie Sorgdrager	Winnie Sorgdrager (born 1948)	Minister	Justice		22 August 1994 – 3 August 1998	Democrats 66
Hans Wijers	Dr. Hans Wijers (born 1951)	Minister	Economic Affairs		22 August 1994 – 3 August 1998	Democrats 66
Joris Voorhoeve	Dr. Joris Voorhoeve (born 1945)	Minister	Defence		22 August 1994 – 3 August 1998	People's Party for Freedom and Democracy
Joris Voorhoeve	Dr. Joris Voorhoeve (born 1945)	Minister	Interior	• Netherlands; Antilles and Aruba Affairs	22 August 1994 – 3 August 1998	People's Party for Freedom and Democracy
Els Borst	Dr. Els Borst (1932–2014)	Minister	Health, Welfare and Sport		3 August 1998 – 22 July 2002^{[Continued]}	Democrats 66
Ad Melkert	Ad Melkert (born 1956)	Minister	Social Affairs and Employment		22 August 1994 – 3 August 1998	Labour Party
Jo Ritzen	Dr. Jo Ritzen (born 1945)	Minister	Education, Culture and Science		7 November 1989 – 3 August 1998^{[Retained]}	Labour Party
Annemarie Jorritsma	Annemarie; Jorritsma (born 1950)	Minister	Transport and Water Management		22 August 1994 – 3 August 1998	People's Party for Freedom and Democracy
Jozias van Aartsen	Jozias van Aartsen (born 1947)	Minister	Agriculture, Nature and Fisheries		22 August 1994 – 3 August 1998	People's Party for Freedom and Democracy
Margreeth de Boer	Margreeth de Boer (born 1939)	Minister	Housing, Spatial; Planning and the Environment		22 August 1994 – 3 August 1998	Labour Party

Minister without portfolio
Ministers		Title/Ministry/Portfolio(s)			Term of office	Party
Jan Pronk	Jan Pronk (born 1940)	Minister	Foreign Affairs	• Development; Cooperation	7 November 1989 – 3 August 1998^{[Retained]}	Labour Party

State Secretaries
Ministers		Title/Ministry/Portfolio(s)			Term of office	Party
	Tonny van de Vondervoort (born 1950)	State Secretary	Interior	• Municipalities	22 August 1994 – 3 August 1998	Labour Party
Jacob Kohnstamm	Jacob Kohnstamm (born 1949)	State Secretary	Interior	• Public Security • Emergency; Services • Emergency; Management • Urban Planning	22 August 1994 – 3 August 1998	Democrats 66
Michiel Patijn	Michiel Patijn (born 1942)	State Secretary	Foreign Affairs	• European Union • Benelux	22 August 1994 – 3 August 1998	People's Party for Freedom and Democracy
Willem Vermeend	Dr. Willem Vermeend (born 1948)	State Secretary	Finance	• Fiscal Policy • Tax and Customs • Governmental; Budget	22 August 1994 – 24 March 2000^{[Continued]}	Labour Party
Elizabeth Schmitz	Elizabeth; Schmitz (1938–2024)	State Secretary	Justice	• Immigration and Asylum • Civil Law • Youth Justice	22 August 1994 – 3 August 1998	Labour Party
Anneke van Dok-van Weele	Anneke van Dok -van Weele (born 1947)	State Secretary^{[Title]}	Economic Affairs	• Trade and Export • Consumer; Protection • Tourism	22 August 1994 – 3 August 1998	Labour Party
Jan Gmelich Meijling	Lieutenant commander Jan Gmelich; Meijling (1936–2012)	State Secretary	Defence	• Human; Resources • Equipment	22 August 1994 – 3 August 1998	People's Party for Freedom and Democracy
Erica Terpstra	Erica Terpstra (born 1943)	State Secretary	Health, Welfare and Sport	• Social Services • Elderly Care • Youth Care • Disability Policy • Minorities • Food Policy • Recreation • Sport	22 August 1994 – 3 August 1998	People's Party for Freedom and Democracy
Robin Linschoten	Robin Linschoten (born 1956)	State Secretary	Social Affairs and Employment	• Social Security • Unemployment • Occupational; Safety	22 August 1994 – 28 June 1996^{[Res]}	People's Party for Freedom and Democracy
Frank de Grave	Frank de Grave (born 1955)	State Secretary	Social Affairs and Employment	• Social Security • Unemployment • Occupational; Safety	2 July 1996 – 3 August 1998	People's Party for Freedom and Democracy
Tineke Netelenbos	Tineke Netelenbos (born 1944)	State Secretary	Education, Culture and Science	• Primary; Education • Secondary; Education • Special; Education	22 August 1994 – 3 August 1998	Labour Party
Aad Nuis	Aad Nuis (1933–2007)	State Secretary	Education, Culture and Science	• Science Policy • Media • Culture • Art	22 August 1994 – 3 August 1998	Democrats 66
Dick Tommel	Dr. Dick Tommel (1942–2023)	State Secretary	Housing, Spatial; Planning and the Environment	• Public Housing • Spatial Planning	22 August 1994 – 3 August 1998	Democrats 66

^{Resigned}
^{Retained from the previous cabinet}
^{Continued in the next cabinet}
^{Acting}
^{Designated with the diplomatic rank of Minister}
^{Medical leave of absence from 4 June 1996 until 26 June 1996}
