= Ed van Thijn =

Dutch politician (1934–2021)

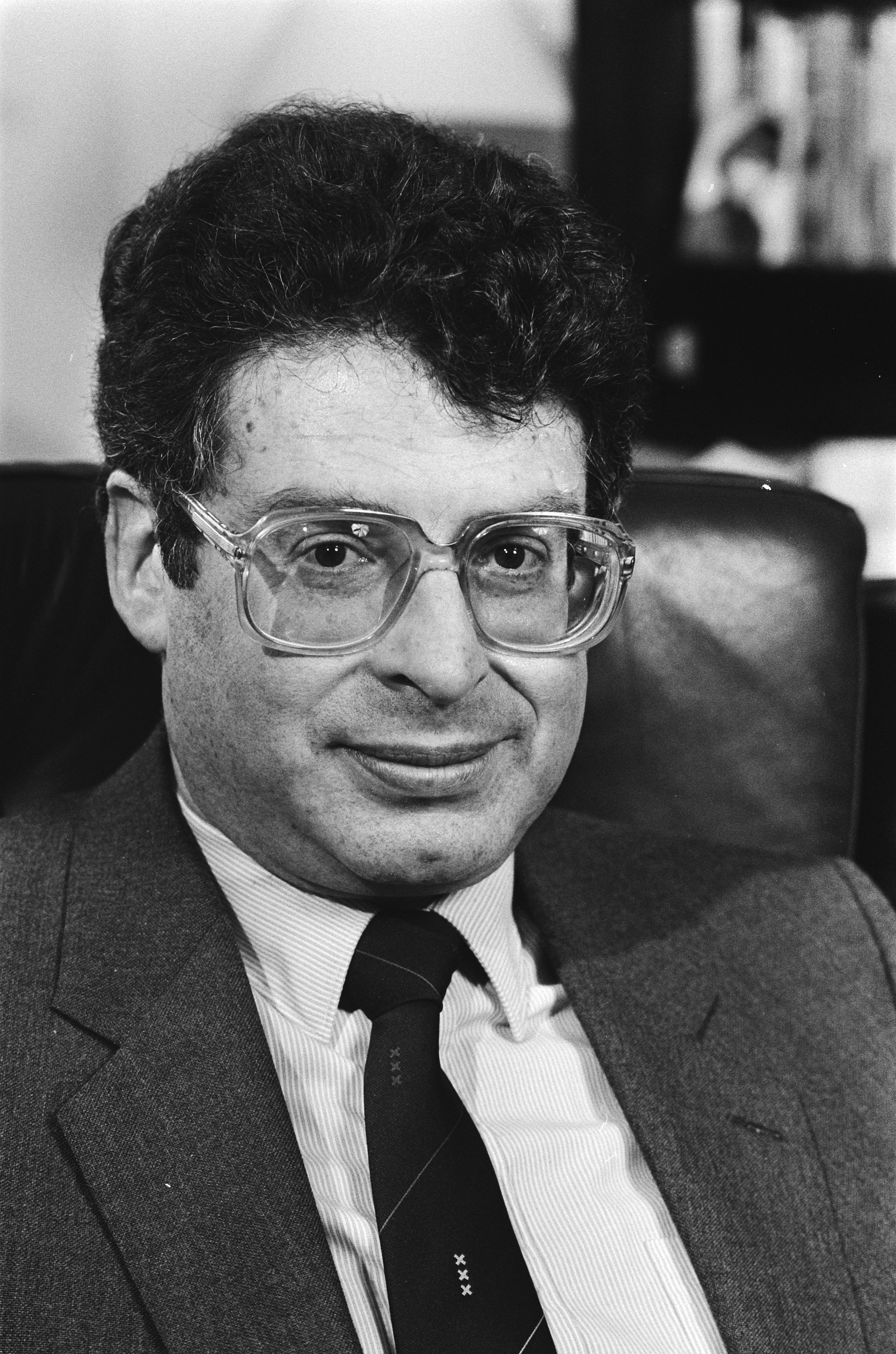

Member of the Senate
- In office 8 June 1999 – 12 June 2007
- Parliamentary group: Labour Party

Mayor of Amsterdam
- In office 16 June 1983 – 18 January 1994
- Preceded by: Enneüs Heerma (Ad interim)
- Succeeded by: Frank de Grave (Acting)

Minister of the Interior
- In office 18 January 1994 – 27 May 1994
- Prime Minister: Ruud Lubbers
- Preceded by: Ernst Hirsch Ballin (Ad interim)
- Succeeded by: Dieuwke de Graaff-Nauta
- In office 11 September 1981 – 29 May 1982
- Prime Minister: Dries van Agt
- Preceded by: Hans Wiegel
- Succeeded by: Max Rood

Parliamentary leader in the House of Representatives
- In office 8 September 1977 – 16 January 1978
- Preceded by: Joop den Uyl
- Succeeded by: Joop den Uyl
- In office 11 May 1973 – 8 June 1977
- Preceded by: Joop den Uyl
- Succeeded by: Joop den Uyl
- Parliamentary group: Labour Party

Member of the House of Representatives
- In office 16 September 1982 – 16 June 1983
- In office 23 February 1967 – 11 September 1981
- Parliamentary group: Labour Party

Personal details
- Born: Eduard van Thijn; 16 August 1934 Amsterdam, Netherlands
- Died: 19 December 2021 (aged 87)
- Party: Labour Party (from 1954)
- Spouses: First wife (m. 1964; div. 1972) Eveline Herfkens (m. 1983; div. 1990) Odette Taminiau (m. 1992)
- Domestic partner: Hedy d'Ancona (1973–1979)
- Children: Carla van Thijn (born 1965); Marion van Thijn (born 1968)
- Education: University of Amsterdam (Bachelor of Social Science, Master of Social Science)
- Occupation: Politician · Historian · Sociologist · Researcher · Corporate director · Nonprofit director · Management consultant · Political pundit · Editor · Author · Professor

Eduard van Thijn (Dutch pronunciation: [ˈeːdyʋɑrt ˈɛt fɑn ˈtɛin]; (Note: Van in isolation is pronounced [vɑn].) 16 August 1934 – 19 December 2021) was a Dutch politician of the Labour Party (PvdA) and historian. He was a member of the Municipal Council of Amsterdam (1962–1971), member of the House of Representatives (1967–1981; 1982–1983), Minister of the Interior (1981–1982; 1994), Mayor of Amsterdam (1983–1994), and member of the Senate (1999–2007).

Van Thijn was also a prolific author, having written more than a dozen books since 1977 about politics, the history of the Jews during World War II, the history of socialism and several autobiographies. He was known for his abilities as a manager and policy wonk. He continued to comment on political affairs until his retirement in 2017 and holds the distinction as the longest-serving Mayor of Amsterdam after World War II with 10 years.

== Early life ==
Van Thijn was born on 16 August 1934 in Amsterdam to Jewish parents who in 1943 were held in the Westerbork transit camp.

Van Thijn attended the Amsterdams Lyceum from September 1945 until June 1952 and applied at the University of Amsterdam in June 1952 majoring in Sociology and obtained a Bachelor of Social Science degree in June 1954 before graduating with a Master of Social Science degree in July 1958. Van Thijn worked as researcher at the Wiardi Beckman Foundation from August 1958 until February 1967.

== Politics ==
=== Municipal council ===
Van Thijn served on the Municipal Council of Amsterdam from May 1962 until September 1971.

=== House of Representatives ===
Van Thijn was elected as a Member of the House of Representatives after the election of 1967, taking office on 23 February 1967. After the election of 1972 the Leader of the Labour Party and Parliamentary leader of the Labour Party in the House of Representatives Joop den Uyl became Prime Minister in the Cabinet Den Uyl and van Thijn was selected as his successor as Parliamentary leader in the House of Representatives on 11 May 1973. After the election of 1977 Den Uyl returned as Parliamentary leader on 8 June 1977 but he was still serving in the cabinet and because of dualism customs in the constitutional convention of Dutch politics he couldn't serve a dual mandate. He subsequently resigned as a Member of the House of Representatives and Parliamentary leader on 8 September 1977 and van Thijn again took over as Parliamentary leader on 8 September 1977. Following the cabinet formation of 1977 the Cabinet Den Uyl was replaced by the Cabinet Van Agt–Wiegel on 19 December 1977 and Den Uyl subsequently returned as a Member of the House of Representatives and as Parliamentary leader on 16 January 1978.

=== Minister of the Interior ===
After the election of 1981 van Thijn was appointed Minister of the Interior in the Cabinet Van Agt II, taking office on 11 September 1981. The Cabinet Van Agt II fell just seven months into its term on 12 May 1982 and continued to serve in a demissionary capacity until it was replaced by the caretaker Cabinet Van Agt III on 29 May 1982.

=== House of Representatives ===
After the election of 1982 van Thijn returned as a Member of the House of Representatives, taking office on 16 September 1982. In May 1983 van Thijn was nominated as the next Mayor of Amsterdam, he resigned as a Member of the House of Representatives the same day he was installed as Mayor, taking office on 16 June 1983.

=== Mayor of Amsterdam ===
On 16 June 1983, van Thijn became Mayor of Amsterdam, serving until resignation on 18 January 1994.

On 4 October 1992, while van Thijn was Amsterdam Mayor, El Al Flight 1862 crashed into the Groeneveen and Klein-Kruitberg flats in the Bijlmermeer (colloquially "Bijlmer") neighbourhood (part of the Amsterdam-Zuidoost district). Hundreds of people were left homeless by the crash; the city's municipal buses were used to transport survivors to emergency shelters. Firefighters and police also were forced to deal with reports of looting in the area.

=== Minister of the Interior ===
Van Thijn was appointed again as Minister of the Interior in the Cabinet Lubbers III following the death of Ien Dales, taking office on 18 January 1994. On 27 May 1994, van Thijn and Minister of Justice Ernst Hirsch Ballin resigned following the conclusions of a parliamentary inquiry report into illegal interrogation techniques used by the police.

=== Semi-retirement from politics ===
Van Thijn semi-retired from active politics and became active in the private sector and public sector and occupied numerous seats as a corporate director and nonprofit director on several boards of directors and supervisory boards (Anne Frank Foundation, T.M.C. Asser Instituut, Institute for Multiparty Democracy, Wiardi Beckman Foundation, and the Royal Academy of Arts and Sciences) and served as a distinguished professor of Sociology, Governmental Studies, and the History of socialism at the University of Amsterdam from 1 December 1995 until 1 December 2003.

=== Senate ===
Van Thijn was elected as a Member of the Senate after the Senate election of 1999, taking office on 8 June 1999 serving as a frontbencher chairing several parliamentary committees. In February 2007 van Thijn announced his retirement from national politics and that he wouldn't stand for the Senate election of 2007 and continued to serve until the end of the parliamentary term on 12 June 2007.

== Personal life ==
Van Thijn had two ex-wives and a domestic partner. In 1992, van Thijn married Odette Taminiau. Van Thijn's children are Carla van Thijn (born 1965) and Marion van Thijn (born 1968). Although not raised religiously observant, in later years he aligned himself with Progressive Judaism.

He died on 19 December 2021, at the age of 87.

== Decorations ==
Honours
Ribbon bar	Honour	Country	Date	Comment
	Knight of the Order of the Netherlands Lion	Netherlands	3 April 1979	
	Commander of the Legion of Honour	France	12 February 1982	
	Grand Cross of the Order of Leopold II	Belgium	15 May 1988	
	Grand Officer of the Order of Orange-Nassau	Netherlands	8 October 1994	Elevated from Commander (9 September 1982)

== Notes ==
Party political offices
Preceded by Anne Vondeling	Deputy Leader of the Labour Party; 1973–1983; Served alongside: André van der Louw (1973–1974); Jos van Kemenade (1977–1983); Wim Meijer (1981–1983)	Succeeded by Jos van Kemenade
Preceded by Anne Vondeling	Deputy Leader of the Labour Party; 1973–1983; Served alongside: André van der Louw (1973–1974); Jos van Kemenade (1977–1983); Wim Meijer (1981–1983)	Succeeded by Wim Meijer
Preceded by Joop den Uyl	Parliamentary leader of the Labour Party in the House of Representatives; 1973–1977; 1977–1978	Succeeded by Joop den Uyl
Political offices
Preceded by Hans Wiegel	Minister of the Interior; 1981–1982; 1994	Succeeded by Max Rood
Preceded by Ernst Hirsch Ballin; Ad interim	Minister of the Interior; 1981–1982; 1994	Succeeded by Dieuwke de Graaff-Nauta
Preceded by Enneüs Heerma; Ad interim	Mayor of Amsterdam; 1983–1994	Succeeded by Frank de Grave; Acting
