= Hans Dijkstal =

Dutch liberal politician

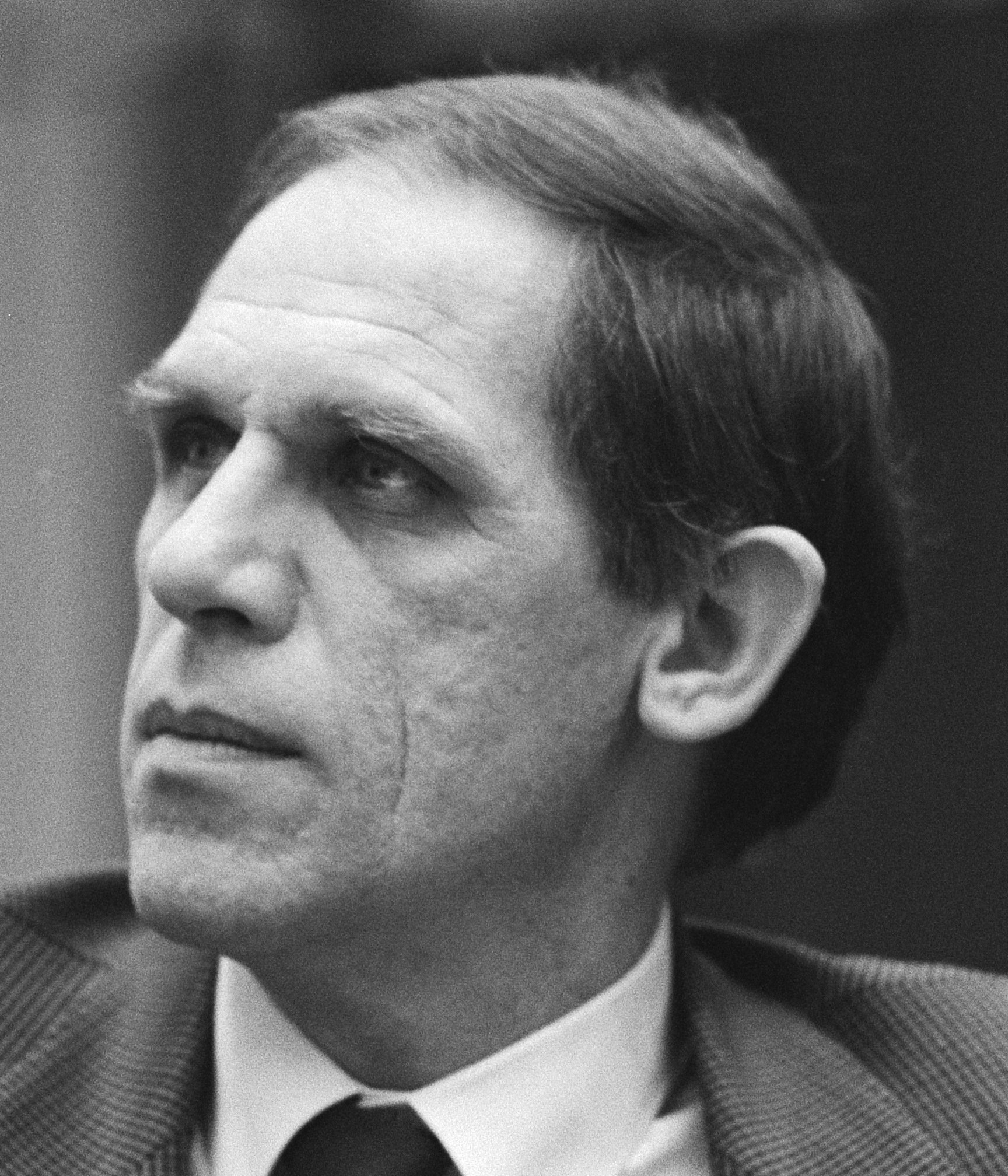
- Hans Dijkstal in 1985

Parliamentary leader in the House of Representatives
- In office 30 July 1998 – 23 May 2002
- Preceded by: Frits Bolkestein
- Succeeded by: Gerrit Zalm

Leader of the People's Party for Freedom and Democracy
- In office 30 July 1998 – 16 May 2002
- Preceded by: Frits Bolkestein
- Succeeded by: Gerrit Zalm

Deputy Prime Minister of the Netherlands
- In office 22 August 1994 – 3 August 1998 Serving with Hans van Mierlo
- Prime Minister: Wim Kok
- Preceded by: Wim Kok
- Succeeded by: Els Borst; Annemarie Jorritsma

Minister of the Interior
- In office 22 August 1994 – 3 August 1998
- Prime Minister: Wim Kok
- Preceded by: Dieuwke de Graaff-Nauta
- Succeeded by: Bram Peper as Minister of the Interior and Kingdom Relations

Member of the House of Representatives
- In office 19 May 1998 – 1 September 2002
- In office 30 July 1986 – 22 August 1994
- In office 11 November 1982 – 3 June 1986

Personal details
- Born: Henri Frans Dijkstal; 28 February 1943 Port Said, Egypt
- Died: 9 May 2010 (aged 67) Wassenaar, Netherlands
- Cause of death: Bone cancer
- Party: People's Party for Freedom and Democracy (from 1966)
- Spouse: Anneke Dijkstal (m. 1966)
- Children: 2 daughters and 1 son
- Education: University of Amsterdam (Bachelor of Law)
- Occupation: Politician · Financial adviser · Management consultant · Corporate director · Nonprofit director · Teacher · Critic · Political pundit · Lobbyist · Activist

Military service
- Allegiance: Netherlands
- Branch/service: Royal Netherlands Air Force
- Years of service: 1965–1967 (Conscription); 1967–1973 (Reserve)
- Rank: Lieutenant
- Unit: Air Operations Control; Station Nieuw-Milligen
- Battles/wars: Cold War

Henri Frans "Hans" Dijkstal (28 February 1943 – 9 May 2010) was a Dutch politician and financial adviser, who served as leader of the People's Party for Freedom and Democracy (VVD)

== Early life, education, military service and early career ==
Dijkstal was born in Port Said, Egypt, where his father and grandfather worked in shipping. He was able to speak fluent Arabic before moving to the Netherlands at age five. Dijkstal applied at the University of Amsterdam in March 1961 majoring in Law and obtaining a Bachelor of Laws degree in June 1964. Dijkstal was conscripted in the Royal Netherlands Air Force serving as a Lieutenant and was stationed at the Air Operations Control Station Nieuw-Milligen as an air traffic controller from April 1965 until May 1967. Dijkstal worked as a financial adviser, management consultant and civics teacher in Wassenaar from August 1967 until November 1982. Dijkstal served on the Municipal Council of Wassenaar from May 1974 until April 1986 and served as an alderman in Wassenaar from March 1978 until July 1983.

== National politics ==
Dijkstal became a member of the House of Representatives after Wim van Eekelen was appointed as State Secretary for Foreign Affairs in the Lubbers I cabinet after the election of 1982, serving from 11 November 1982 until 3 June 1986. Dijkstal returned to the House of Representatives after Ed Nijpels was appointed as Minister of Housing, Spatial Planning and the Environment in the Lubbers II cabinet after the election of 1986, taking office on 30 July 1986 serving as a frontbencher chairing the parliamentary committee for Petitions and the Citizen Initiatives and spokesperson for minorities and welfare. After the election of 1994 Dijkstal was appointed as Deputy Prime Minister of the Netherlands and Minister of the Interior in the Kok I cabinet, taking office on 22 August 1994. After the election of 1998 Dijkstal returned to the House of Representatives, taking office on 19 May 1998.

Following the cabinet formation of 1998 Dijkstal per his own request asked not to be considered for a cabinet post in the new cabinet, he was seen by the party's leadership as the "favorite son" to succeed Frits Bolkenstein as Leader of the People's Party for Freedom and Democracy. In July 1998, Bolkestein announced he was stepping down, and the party leadership approached Dijkstal to succeed him. Dijkstal accepted and became the Leader of the People's Party for Freedom and Democracy and parliamentary leader in the House of Representatives on 30 July 1998.

For the election of 2002 Dijkstal served as lead candidate. Dijkstal and Labour Leader Ad Melkert were the front runners to become the next Prime Minister, but the unexpected arrival of Pim Fortuyn of Livable Netherlands (LN) and later the Pim Fortuyn List (LPF), turned the polls. Fortuyn blamed the problems in the country on the Purple cabinets (in which both Dijkstal and Melkert served as ministers). Fortuyn depicted Dijkstal and Melkert as two bureaucrats who did not understand the feelings and problems among the population. After a heated campaign a mere days before the election, Fortuyn was assassinated in Hilversum. The VVD suffered a big loss, losing 14 seats and now had 24 seats in the House of Representatives. Dijkstal accepted responsibility for the defeat, and announced his resignation as leader on 16 May 2002. He continued to serve in the House of Representatives as a backbencher until his resignation on 1 September 2002.

When his former party started taking a heavy stance on allochtonen (immigrants and their children) he teamed up with former politicians from a wide range of other parties in protest, to strive for a more tolerant society, under the name Een Land Een Samenleving ("One Country One Society").

== Post-politics ==
Dijkstal retired from national politics and became active in the private and public sectors and occupied numerous seats as a corporate director and nonprofit director on several boards of directors and supervisory boards (Institute for Multiparty Democracy, International Institute of Social History, Naturalis Biodiversity Center, Public Pension Funds APB and the Anne Frank Foundation) and served on several state commissions and councils on behalf of the government (Council for Public Administration, Kadaster and the Netherlands Film Fund) and as an advocate, lobbyist and activist for social justice and democracy.

== Personal life ==
On 29 July 1966 he married Anneke Dijkstal and became the father of two daughters.

He was a fan and admirer of Star Trek.

== Death ==
Dijkstal continued to comment on political affairs until his death from bone cancer at the age of 67.

== Decorations ==
Honours
Ribbon bar	Honour	Country	Date	Comment
	Officer of the Order of Orange-Nassau	Netherlands	30 October 1998	

Party political offices
Preceded by Frits Bolkestein	Leader of the People's Party for Freedom and Democracy; 1998–2002	Succeeded by Gerrit Zalm
Preceded by Frits Bolkestein	Parliamentary leader of the People's Party for Freedom and Democracy in the House of Representatives; 1998–2002	Succeeded by Gerrit Zalm
Preceded by Frits Bolkestein; 1998	Lead candidate of the People's Party for Freedom and Democracy; 2002	Succeeded by Gerrit Zalm; 2003
Political offices
Preceded by Wim Kok	Deputy Prime Minister of the Netherlands; 1994–1998; Served alongside: Hans van Mierlo	Succeeded by Annemarie Jorritsma; Els Borst
Preceded by Dieuwke de Graaff-Nauta	Minister of the Interior; 1994–1998	Succeeded by Bram Peper as Minister of the Interior and Kingdom Relations
Non-profit organization positions
Unknown	Chairman of the Netherlands Film Fund; 2003–2007	Unknown
Unknown	Chairman of the Naturalis Biodiversity Center; 2004–2010	Succeeded by Elco Brinkman
