= Wim Kok =

Prime Minister of the Netherlands from 1994 to 2002

His Excellency Wim Kok
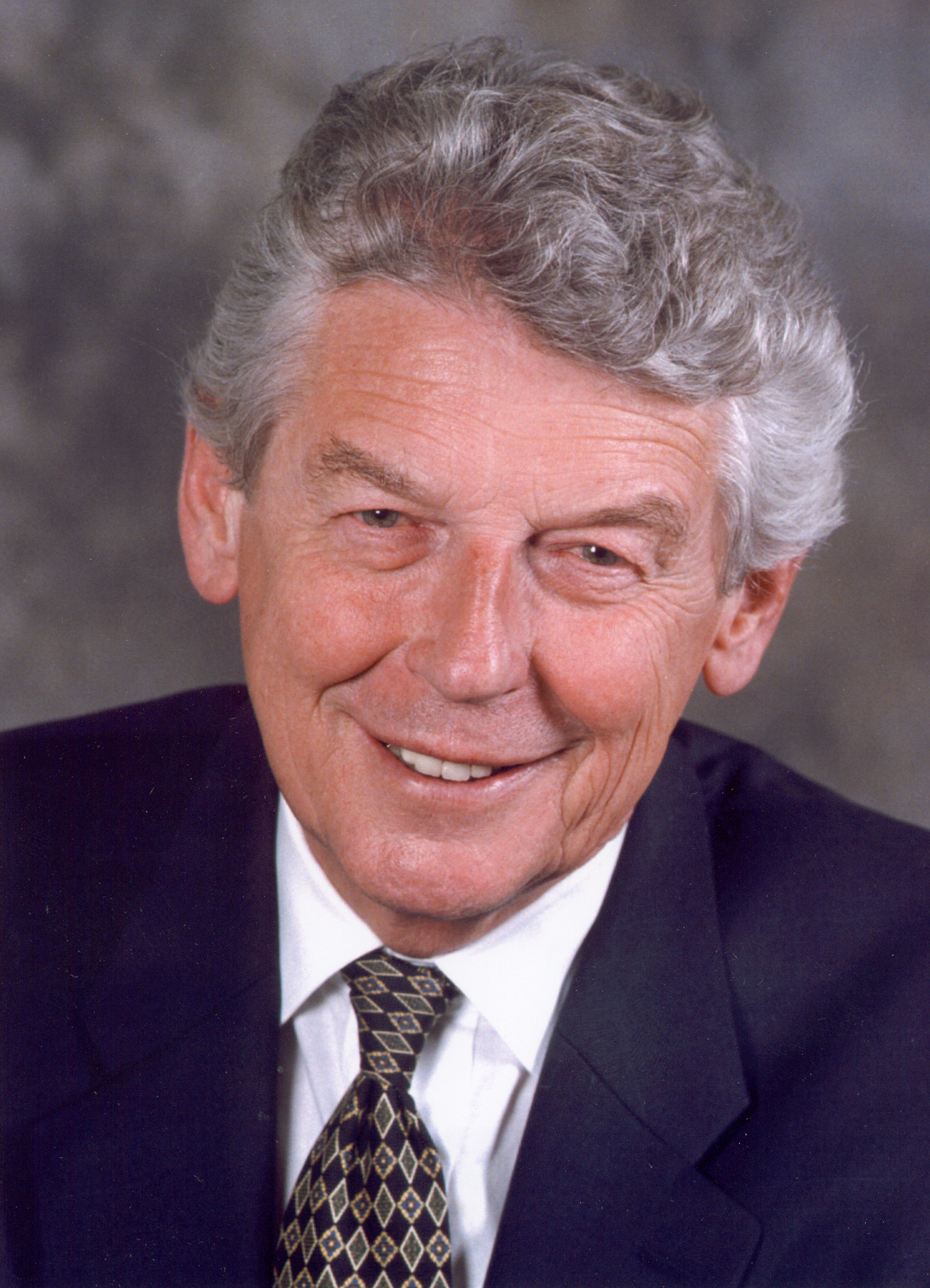
- Official portrait, 1994

Prime Minister of the Netherlands
- In office 22 August 1994 – 22 July 2002
- Monarch: Beatrix
- Deputy: See list: Hans Dijkstal (1994–1998) Hans van Mierlo (1994–1998) Annemarie Jorritsma (1998–2002) Els Borst (1998–2002)
- Preceded by: Ruud Lubbers
- Succeeded by: Jan Peter Balkenende

Deputy Prime Minister of the Netherlands
- In office 7 November 1989 – 22 August 1994
- Prime Minister: Ruud Lubbers
- Preceded by: Rudolf de Korte
- Succeeded by: Hans Dijkstal; Hans van Mierlo

Minister of Finance
- In office 7 November 1989 – 22 August 1994
- Prime Minister: Ruud Lubbers
- Preceded by: Onno Ruding
- Succeeded by: Gerrit Zalm

Leader of the Labour Party
- In office 21 July 1986 – 15 December 2001
- Deputy: Wim Meijer; Thijs Wöltgens; Jacques Wallage; Ad Melkert
- Preceded by: Joop den Uyl
- Succeeded by: Ad Melkert

Leader of the Labour Party in the House of Representatives
- In office 19 May 1998 – 30 May 1998
- Preceded by: Jacques Wallage
- Succeeded by: Jacques Wallage
- In office 17 May 1994 – 22 August 1994
- Preceded by: Thijs Wöltgens
- Succeeded by: Jacques Wallage
- In office 21 July 1986 – 5 November 1989
- Preceded by: Joop den Uyl
- Succeeded by: Thijs Wöltgens

Member of the House of Representatives
- In office 19 May 1998 – 22 August 1998
- In office 17 May 1994 – 22 August 1994
- In office 3 June 1986 – 7 November 1989

Personal details
- Born: Willem Kok; 29 September 1938 Bergstoep, Bergambacht, Netherlands
- Died: 20 October 2018 (aged 80) Amsterdam, Netherlands
- Party: Labour (from 1961)
- Spouse: Margrietha Lummechiena Roukema (m. 1965)
- Education: Nyenrode Business School (BBA)
- Occupation: Politician; Trade union leader; Businessman; Corporate director; Nonprofit director; Lobbyist; Activist
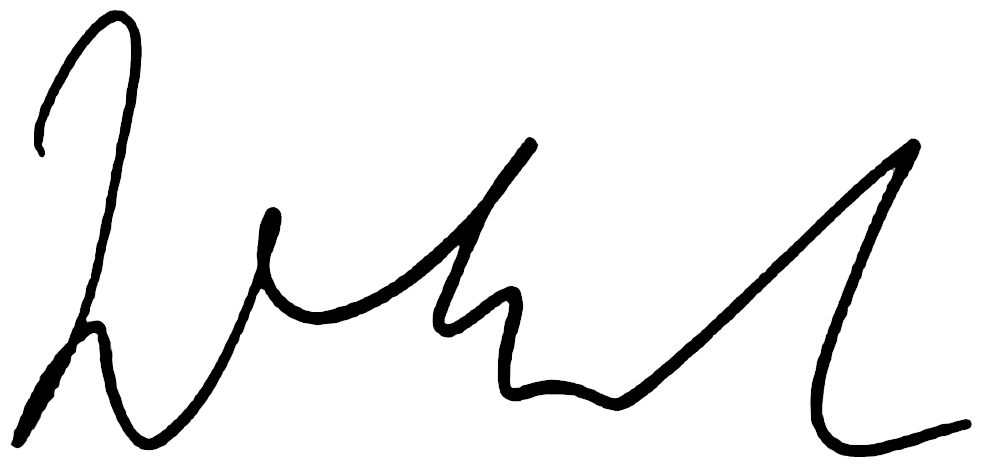
- Signature

Military service
- Allegiance: Netherlands
- Branch/service: Royal Netherlands Army
- Years of service: 1958–1959 (Conscription); 1959–1974 (Reserve)
- Rank: Lieutenant

Willem "Wim" Kok (Dutch pronunciation: [ˈʋɪm ˈkɔk]; 29 September 1938 – 20 October 2018) was a Dutch politician and trade union leader who served as Prime Minister of the Netherlands from 22 August 1994 until 22 July 2002. He was a member of the Labour Party (PvdA).

Kok studied business administration at the Nyenrode Business School, obtaining a Bachelor of Business Administration degree, and worked as a trade union leader for the Dutch Confederation of Trade Unions from 1961 until 1976, serving as its chairman from 1972. In 1976 it merged to form the Federation of Dutch Trade Unions, with Kok serving as its first chairman until 1986. In the 1986 general election, Kok was elected to the House of Representatives, taking office on 3 June 1986. Shortly after the election, incumbent leader of the Labour Party Joop den Uyl announced he was stepping down and endorsed Kok as his successor, taking office on 21 July 1986. For the 1989 general election, Kok served as lead candidate, after which he struck a coalition agreement with incumbent Prime Minister Ruud Lubbers of the Christian Democratic Appeal (CDA), forming the third Lubbers cabinet. Kok became deputy prime minister and minister of finance, taking office on 7 November 1989.

For the 1994 general election, Kok served as lead candidate again and, following a cabinet formation, formed the first Kok cabinet, taking office as Prime Minister of the Netherlands on 22 August 1994. For the 1998 general election, Kok served as lead candidate once more, and after another successful cabinet formation, formed the second Kok cabinet, continuing as prime minister for a second term. In December 2001, Kok announced he was stepping down as party leader and that he would not stand for the 2002 general election or serve another term as prime minister. Kok left office following the installation of the first Balkenende cabinet on 22 July 2002.

Kok retired from active politics at 63 and became active in the private and public sectors as a corporate and non-profit director, served on several state commissions and councils on behalf of the government, and continued to be active as a lobbyist for the European Union, advocating further European integration. Kok was known for his abilities as a manager and negotiator. During his premiership, his cabinets were responsible for several major social reforms, such as the legalization of same-sex marriage and euthanasia, and further reducing the deficit. Kok was granted the honorary title of Minister of State on 11 April 2003 and continued to comment on political affairs as a statesman until his death at the age of 80. He holds the distinction of leading the first purple coalitions as prime minister and is consistently ranked both by scholars and the public as one of the best prime ministers after World War II.

== Early life ==
Willem Kok was born on 29 September 1938, in Bergstoep, Bergambacht in the Dutch province of South Holland, the son of Willem Kok, a carpenter, and Neeltje de Jager.

After completing his studies in business at the Nyenrode Business Universiteit, he started his career in 1961 at the socialist Dutch Confederation of Trade Unions (NVV), where he was chairman from 1973 until 1982. In 1982, the NVV merged with the Dutch Catholic Trade Union Federation (NKV) to form the Federation of Dutch Trade Unions (FNV), of which he served as chair until 1986. In this position, he helped negotiate the Wassenaar Agreement.

== Political career ==
=== Parliamentary leader and Minister of Finance ===
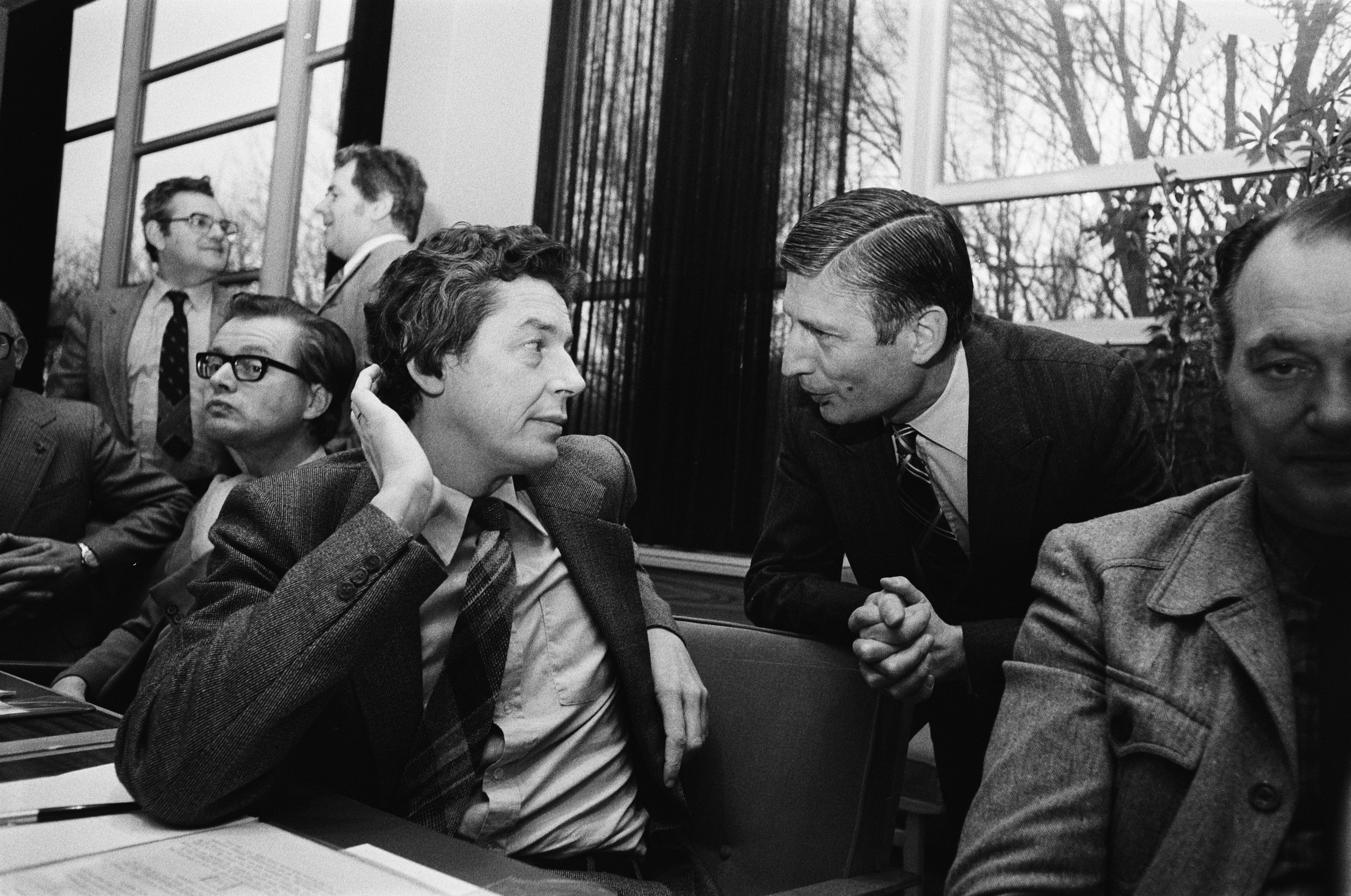
Trade union leader Wim Kok and Prime Minister Dries van Agt during a meeting of the Social and Economic Council in The Hague on 20 December 1979

Kok was elected to the House of Representatives on 3 June 1986, after the 1986 general election. Soon after the election Joop den Uyl, the leader of the Labour Party and the party's parliamentary leader in the House of Representatives, announced that he was stepping down after serving twenty years as party leader. Kok was elected to succeed him and became party and parliamentary leader of the Labour Party in the House of Representatives on 21 July 1986, serving as opposition leader during the parliamentary period of the second Lubbers cabinet.

Kok led his party in the 1989 general election. The Labour Party lost three seats, but the following cabinet formation resulted in a coalition agreement with the Christian Democratic Appeal (CDA), which formed the third Lubbers cabinet. Kok entered government for the first time and became both Deputy Prime Minister of the Netherlands and Minister of Finance, serving from 7 November 1989 until 22 August 1994.

=== Prime Minister of the Netherlands ===
==== First term (1994–1998) ====
In the 1994 general election, the Labour Party lost twelve seats, but the CDA with new leader Elco Brinkman lost twenty seats, making the Labour Party the largest party in the House of Representatives. After an arduous cabinet formation with the conservative liberal People's Party for Freedom and Democracy (VVD) and the social liberal Democrats 66 (D66), a deal was struck that resulted in the first Kok cabinet, with Kok as prime minister. It was considered groundbreaking in Dutch politics as this was the first Cabinet of the Netherlands since 1918 without a Christian democratic party.

The main aim of the first Kok cabinet was to create employment. The Dutch economy had been in a deep recession for years. The market was allowed more influence in the economy. This led to a policy of tax reduction, economizing, and trying to keep people out of social care by supporting employment; large infrastructure projects were set in motion. Another aim was to put an end to the enormous debt of the Dutch government. The Treaty of Amsterdam was signed during this cabinet.

Kok's first term also saw various cuts and changes to education and welfare. Regarding education, spending on education, culture and sciences was cut by 1,772 million guilders. In addition, according to one study, "A law concerning the modernization of the universities' administrative structure replaced the democratized structure of the 1970s with a more autocratic system, inspired by the management style of business concerns." Although primary education received some extra money, which made it possible to introduce computers and decrease the average number of pupils in 4 years, the latter resulted in a shortage of classrooms and teachers. Before 1996, the government provided a study allowance to people with a low income. That year, the Study Costs Allowance Act (WTS) was introduced, under which the number of standard amounts decreased and hard income limits were introduced. According to one study, "It soon became apparent that the WTS gave rise to a lot of distressing situations. These situations are mainly related to the hard income limits that led to a major drop in income. In addition, the income limit of the WTS was independent of the number of children per family." In the 1998 coalition agreement, however, "these hard limits were corrected and more money was made available to more people." Regarding welfare, amendments were made to the General Child Benefit Act in 1995, under which benefit was increased with age only for the first child, while from 1996 child benefit only became payable for children up until the age of 18, while previously child benefit was paid up until the age of 24 under certain circumstances. Social Assistance was revised in 1995, with a tightening of both eligibility and entitlement rules. A special supplement for pensioners was abolished, the eligibility criteria were tightened, certain cash benefits to children and widows were reduced, unemployment eligibility criteria were tightened, and benefits were cut in the disability pension law. A linking law was adopted, which made it possible to link data sets from the population register, social security, and the aliens police (where all aliens must register). The goal of this was to oppose illegal residence by excluding illegal aliens from collective provisions such as social security benefits. In 1996, compulsory sick pay was entirely privatized, and wage continuation as a percentage of usual wages went down from 75 to 70%, although duration was extended to 52 weeks. With the review of a rent allowance, residents of non-self-contained accommodation were no longer entitled to rent subsidy in 1997. As noted by one study, "For people with a minimum social benefit and children, purchasing power decreased in the first three years of the cabinet's term of office. During the whole cabinet period their purchasing power increased with a meagre two-tenths of a per cent per annum, due to an increase of two per cent in the election year (cpb 1998: 22,168–177)." Under pressure from the churches and other groupings, however, "the cabinet placed the problem of poverty on the policy agenda." Some support was given to financially vulnerable groups, with compensations in the individual rent subsidy for households with children and an income at the level of the social minimum, measures for those elderly with only a general old age pension or a small additional pension, and a higher extra allowance for the first child. In addition, before the elections of 1998, "the decreased purchasing power was repaired with 850 million guilders, mainly for people on social benefit."

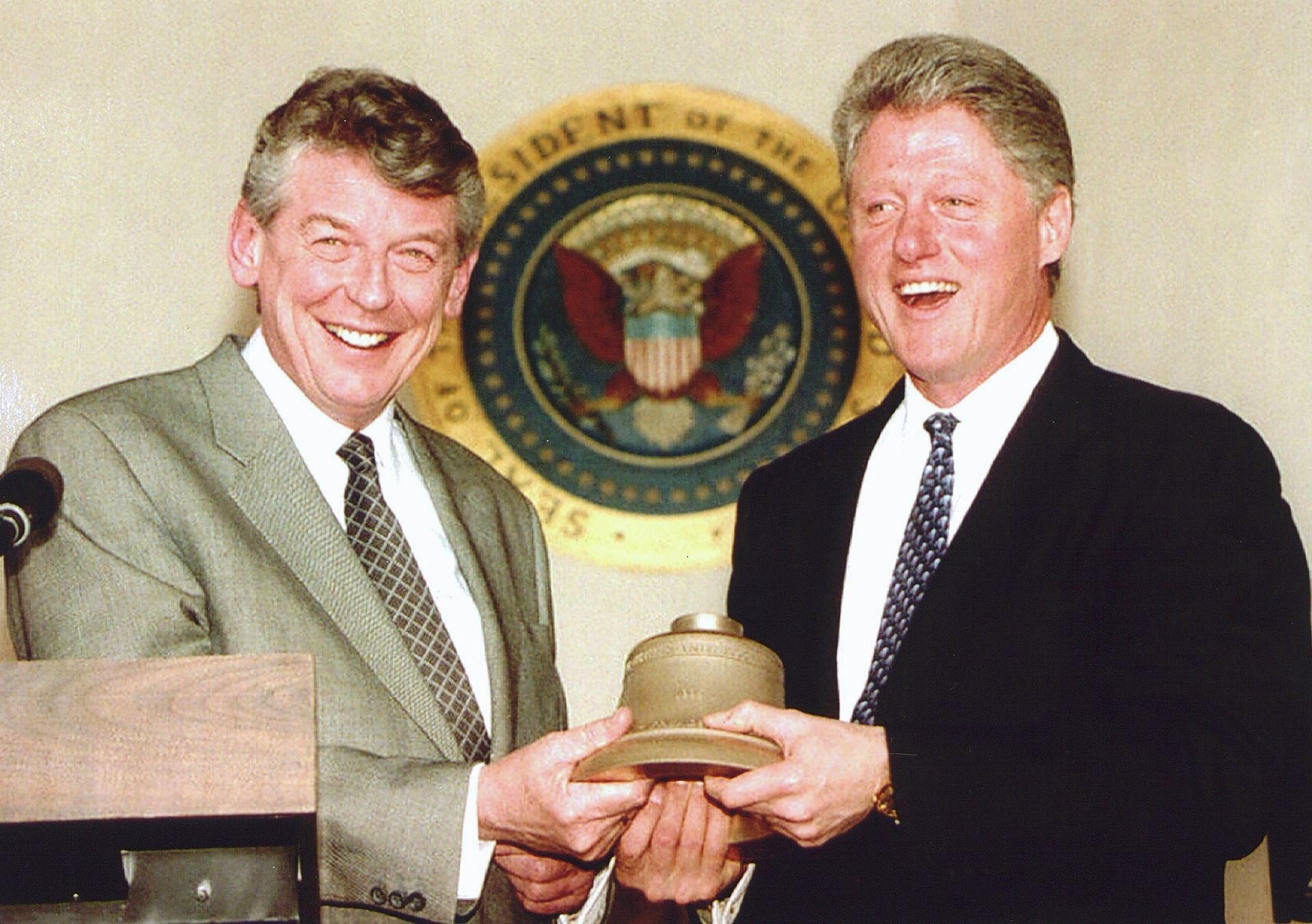
Prime Minister Wim Kok with U.S. President Bill Clinton on 28 February 1995

Despite its cuts and changes to welfare and education, a number of progressive measures were introduced during the Kok cabinet's time in office. In 1994, a reform was passed including part-time workers in the occupational pension funds. In terms of residential care, a personal budget was introduced in 1995 to meet various individual needs; offering a choice "between care in kind, or cash payments that could also be used to purchasing services from private and market sector." Employment protection was also maintained while past plans to reduce it were "shelved," income tax for the lower paid was cut, and 40,000 jobs in the public sector for the long-term unemployed were created. From 1995, "elderly people with an income in the first tax bracket have a tax benefit. Due to the elderly person's deduction, the net AOW pension is higher." In 1997, a separate tax deduction for single elderly persons was introduced on 1 January 1997. According to one study, "For this group of elderly people with only an AOW pension, this measure provides an additional income benefit of approximately 1 percent (approximately NLG 160 on an annual basis)." The personal contribution for the costs of disability support services under the Disability Facilities Act (Wvg) was also considerably relaxed as of 1 April 1996. According to one report "The personal contribution for a wheelchair has been cancelled and for the other facilities in kind it remains limited to f 100."

Under a circular from the Ministry of Social Affairs and Employment dated 6 June 1996 (BZ/UK/96/2613), municipalities "have been given the option of allocating municipal income support benefits categorically (the effect of this circular has been extended by the letter of the Ministry of Social Affairs and Employment of 30 May 2000, no. BZ/IW/00/34933A)." An amendment to the General Assistance Act (Abw) 'in connection with the prevention and combating of poverty and social exclusion' (Bulletin of Acts and Decrees 193 of 2 May 1997) "has ensured that from 1 July 1997 municipalities can also provide categorical special assistance in addition to individual special assistance." The government also attempted to support child care through the Stimulation of Child Care Act (1996), which made childcare provisions "a shared responsibility between the government, the employer and the working parent." From 1996, municipalities "have been able to appeal to a new subsidy option to provide childcare to single parents on social assistance, who are following schooling or who accept part-time or full-time work." In 1996 some 525 municipalities applied for this subsidy. As of 1 January 1997, municipalities and water boards "have more extensive opportunity to grant a waiver."

In 1997, more flexibility introduced into the parental leave scheme, with employees able to request to spread leave over more than 26 weeks or take up more hours per week. That same year the rent subsidy was changed, with subject subsidies for tenants becoming more explicitly aimed at support for lower-income groups. Also in 1997, coverage of the AWBZ (a separate mandatory insurance scheme for long-term care set up in 1968) was extended to residential care for the elderly. From 1997 the TOG act on 'allowance for cost of maintenance of multiple and severely physically handicapped children' "offers a financial support to parents who look after their severely handicapped children (3 till 18 years) at their home." In January 1998, national Disability Insurance was abolished, but a new law called Wajong was introduced. In addition, an Act of 24 April 1997 provided for "a new insurance to protect self-employed workers and their spouses in case of long-term disability." An Act of 11 September 1997 provided for "new regulations that concern persons who are under the age of 65, suffer from physical or mental disabilities and can therefore only work full-time in jobs which are especially suited for them." It also provided that each community ("gemeente") "has the responsibility to provide as many employment opportunities as possible to persons who are considered able to work only in jobs tailored to their needs or capacities." From July 1997 onwards, "the residents of care homes no longer pay individually for the viewing and listening fee." The Temporary Income Provision Former In-land Navigation Entrepreneurs Act of 1997 sought "to rectify a lack of income support for entrepreneurs who have become incapable of continuing their work for reasons of old-age or disability. The income assistance and benefit provisions become effective as of 1 January 1999."

From April 1998 onwards, persons aged 65 and above received a support higher than other persons entitled to social assistance, known as the elderly person norm. An Act of 23 April 1998 established new rules with regard to the (re)integration of the disabled, such as remuneration, the promotion of equal opportunities, the provision of facilities, reintegration benefits, allowances for occupationally disabled WAZ insured persons, income supplements for occupationally disabled self-employed persons, wage supplements, and starter loans.

In the 1998 general election, the Labour party gained eight seats; the coalition retained its majority, and cabinet formation resulted in a continuation of policies with the second Kok cabinet.

==== Second term (1998–2002) ====
The second cabinet was the successor of the first cabinet and was formed from the same coalition of PvdA, VVD and D66. It was also known as the "second purple cabinet" called such because it contained both the social democratic PvdA (red) and the liberal VVD (blue). The aim of the cabinet was to continue the policy of cabinet Kok I, which was concerned with economizing, tax reduction, and making an end to unemployment. Kok was the prime minister, while Annemarie Jorritsma served as the deputy prime minister for the VVD, and Els Borst for D66. The cabinet had both left-wing and right-wing political parties as a part of it. There was no strong opposition in the House of Representatives. This did not mean that Kok did not face any problems. In May 1999, D66 stepped out of the coalition when proposed legislation on referendums, entered by this party, was blocked; through negotiations, the crisis was solved, and the cabinet stayed together. Moreover, allegations of expenses abuse were made against Minister of the Interior and Kingdom Relations Bram Peper from the time he was mayor of Rotterdam. On 13 March 2000, Peper resigned as minister, according to himself to no longer bring problems to the public government, and to be better able to defend himself. On the other hand, Kok's second term is known for legalizing same-sex marriage and euthanasia. A number of other reforms were also realised. A reform of bankruptcy was carried out, with the Bankruptcy Act providing a debt rescheduling scheme for natural persons as of 1 December 1998. In January 1999, the Flexibility and Security Act took effect, which made "fixed employment more flexible and increased the security of flexible employees." On 1 November 1999, a new law on working conditions took effect, which created scope "for a more prominent role of works councils in the field of working conditions." A system of penalties was also introduced under which the Labour Inspectorate may fine any employer "who has not drawn up a risk inventory and assessment covering risks to pregnant women and those who have recently given birth or are breastfeeding, who does not provide the women concerned with information about the potential risks, or who does not offer alternative work if necessary." In 1999, a law was introduced called WWIK (Work and Income Provision for Artists Act), under which poor artists "who would otherwise need social benefits can for a maximum of four years receive the WWIK benefits while still being allowed to earn some money in the arts and without an obligation to apply for other jobs." The Adaptation of Working Hours Act gave employees "the right to request the shortening or lengthening of their working hours." One of the aims of the law was to promote the combination of work and care duties for both men and women. A Student Finance Act was introduced in 2000 with the intention of making it financially possible for everyone in the Netherlands to study. Under this Act, "as a student you may be entitled to a loan or gift from the government."

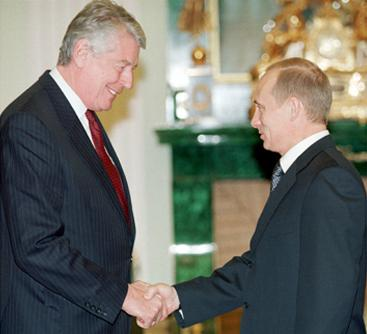
Prime Minister Wim Kok and President of Russia Vladimir Putin in Moscow on 19 January 2001

Under the Working Hours Act of 2000, part-time workers were granted an explicit right to equal treatment in all areas negotiated by the social partners, such as second-tier pensions, holiday pay, subsidized care provision, training and education, basic social security, and wages. From 2001 onwards, counselling, training, and job offers were provided for all jobseekers after being unemployed for 6 months. On 1 January 2002, a new Work and Care Act came into force. This legislation brought together various existing and new leave provisions and sought to facilitate the reconciliation of work and family responsibilities. In addition to the amendment of existing regulations, such as those governing maternity and parental leave, new provisions covered the right to adjust working hours if personal circumstances require; two days of paid paternity leave; four weeks' leave for couples who adopt a child; and two days of paid leave per year for urgent personal reasons, along with 10 days of paid leave a year to care for family members. In 2001, a Labor Income Tax Credit (similar to the Earned Income Tax Credit in the United States) was introduced, providing tax relief to earners of labor income as a means of incentivizing employment. An extra tax credit for households with children was also introduced, along with the general tax credit (the successor to the tax-free allowance), and the young disabled person's tax credit for employees receiving a Wajong benefit. In addition, according to one study the percentage of the population living in poverty fell during Kok's second term in office.

On 15 December 2001, Kok announced he would retire from national politics after the elections of May 2002. He stood down as leader of the Labour Party that same day, in favour of Ad Melkert. Melkert did not appeal to the voter. Moreover, the "polder model" went out of fashion in early 2002, which saw the rise of Pim Fortuyn, a political newcomer.

The Srebrenica massacre occurred under the responsibility of the first Kok cabinet, which eventually led to the fall of the second Kok cabinet. On 16 April 2002, close to the natural end of term for the cabinet, prime minister Kok wished to resign early after being harshly criticised in a government-commissioned report by the NIOD Institute for War, Holocaust and Genocide Studies regarding the fall of Srebrenica in 1995 and the other ministers had no choice but to follow him. The second Kok cabinet remained in place as a caretaker cabinet, which had to cope with the murder of Fortuyn, and the CDA with leader Jan Peter Balkenende winning the elections. The caretaker cabinet stepped down on 22 July 2002, when the first Balkenende cabinet was installed.

=== Legacy ===
Kok was highly praised for his Third Way and polder model philosophies and for the success of leading his Purple Coalitions. During his premiership, his cabinets were responsible for implementing several social reforms, legalizing same-sex marriage and euthanasia, stimulating the economy resulting in more employment and privatization and further reducing the deficit. As a result of this, and because of his skills as a manager and negotiator, Kok was praised by his fellow European leaders.

== Subsequent work ==
After his premiership, Kok retired from active politics at the age of 63 and became a lobbyist for the European Union and presided over several "high-level groups". He also occupied numerous seats on supervisory boards in the business and industry world (ING Group, Koninklijke TNT Post, Royal Dutch Shell, KLM, Stork B.V., International Commission on Missing Persons, International Crisis Group, Anne Frank Foundation and served as president of the Club of Madrid from 2009 until December 2013). On 11 April 2003, he was granted the honorary title of Minister of State.

=== Lisbon Strategy ===
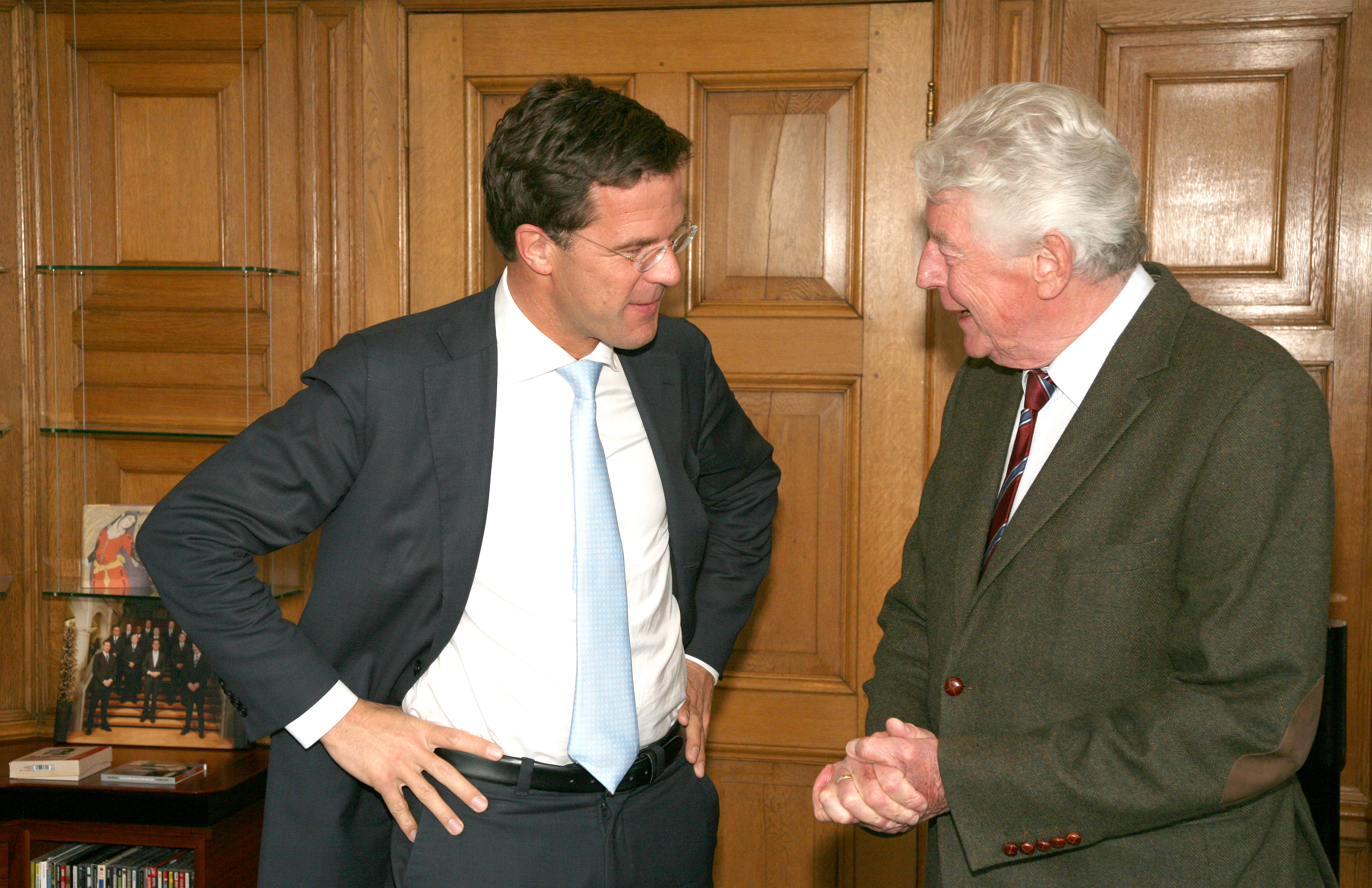
Prime Minister Mark Rutte and Wim Kok in Het Torentje on 4 April 2011

Between April and November 2004, Kok headed up a review of the Lisbon Strategy and presented a report containing suggestions on how to give new impetus to the Lisbon process. The European Commission used this report to declare that the social and environmental parts are no longer a priority and declared a return to the Lisbon Agenda under economic terms only. Kok lobbied for the Lisbon Strategy of the European Commission and was appointed to the Honorary Board of the European Association of History Educators.

Between 2006 and 2007, Kok served as member of the Amato Group, a group of high-level European politicians unofficially working on rewriting the Treaty establishing a Constitution for Europe into what became known as the Treaty of Lisbon following its rejection by French and Dutch voters.

== Personal life ==
In 1965, after four years of dating, Kok married Margrietha Lummechiena "Rita" Roukema (born 3 November 1939). He adopted her two children from a previous marriage, daughter Carla (born 1959) and son André (born 1961 and died 30 March 2022), who was mentally disabled, and together they had a third child, son Marcel (born 1966). Kok lived in Amsterdam from 1960 until his death, first in the neighbourhood of Osdorp and later Slotervaart.

== Death ==
On October 20, 2018, Wim Kok died from heart failure in a hospital in Amsterdam, aged 80, in the presence of his wife, children and grandchildren.

== Decorations ==
=== Titles ===
Honorific titles
Ribbon bar	Honour	Country	Date	Comment
	Minister of State	Netherlands	11 April 2003	Style of Excellency

=== Honours ===
Honours
Ribbon bar	Honour	Country	Date	Comment
	Knight Grand Cross of the Order of Isabella the Catholic	Spain	19 October 2001	
	Knight Grand Cross of the Order of Orange-Nassau	Netherlands	10 December 2002	
	Grand Officer of the Order of the Three Stars	Latvia	16 October 2004	
	Commander's Cross with Star of the Order of Merit of the Republic of Poland	Poland	25 May 2015	

== Honorary degrees ==
Honorary degrees
University	Field	Country	Date	Comment
Nyenrode Business University	Public administration	Netherlands	2 September 2003	
University of Münster	Philosophy	Germany	2003	

Party political offices
Preceded by Joop den Uyl	Leader of the Labour Party; 1986–2001	Succeeded by Ad Melkert
Preceded by Joop den Uyl	Leader of the Labour Party in the House of Representatives; 1986–1989	Succeeded by Thijs Wöltgens
Preceded by Thijs Wöltgens	Leader of the Labour Party in the House of Representatives; 1994	Succeeded by Jacques Wallage
Preceded by Jacques Wallage	Leader of the Labour Party in the House of Representatives; 1998	Succeeded by Jacques Wallage
Political offices
Preceded by Rudolf de Korte	Deputy Prime Minister of the Netherlands; 1989–1994	Succeeded by Hans Dijkstal; Hans van Mierlo
Preceded by Onno Ruding	Minister of Finance; 1989–1994	Succeeded by Gerrit Zalm
Preceded by Ruud Lubbers	Prime Minister of the Netherlands; Minister of General Affairs; 1994–2002	Succeeded by Jan Peter Balkenende
Preceded by John Bruton	President of the European Council; 1997	Succeeded by Jean-Claude Juncker
Trade union offices
Preceded by Heinz Oskar Vetter	President of the European Trade Union Confederation; 1979–1982	Succeeded by Georges Debunne
Non-profit organization positions
Preceded by Johan Stekelenburg	Chairman of the Anne Frank Foundation; 2004–2016	Succeeded by Ernst Hirsch Ballin
Preceded by Ricardo Lagos	President of the Club of Madrid; 2009–2014	Succeeded by Vaira Vīķe-Freiberga
