= Jaap Boersma =

Dutch politician (1929–2012)

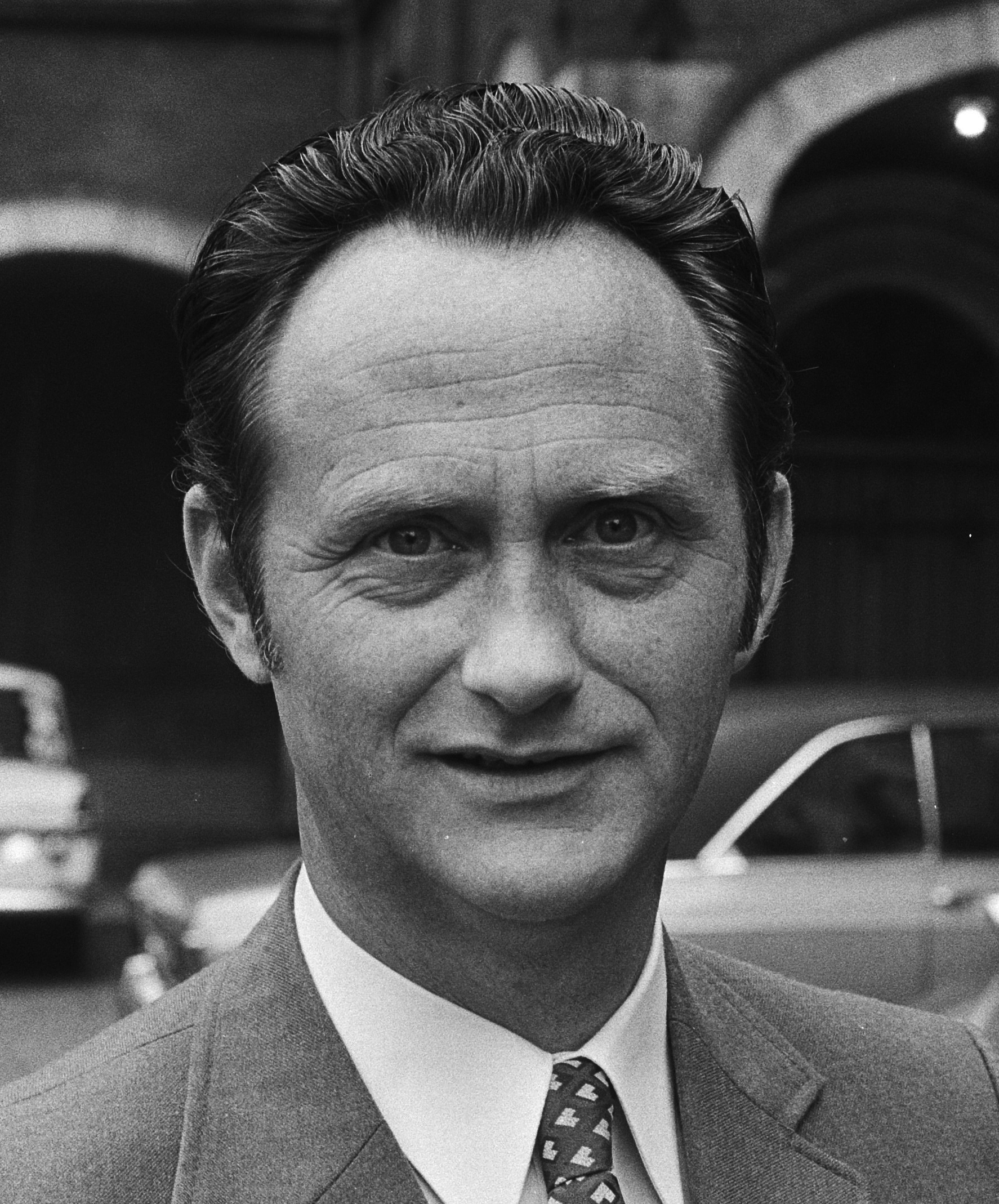
- Jaap Boersma in 1971

Minister of Agriculture and Fisheries
- In office 1 January 1973 – 11 May 1973; Ad interim
- Prime Minister: Barend Biesheuvel
- Preceded by: Pierre Lardinois
- Succeeded by: Tiemen Brouwer

Minister of Social Affairs
- In office 6 July 1971 – 19 December 1977
- Prime Minister: Barend Biesheuvel (1971–1973); Joop den Uyl (1973–1977)
- Preceded by: Bauke Roolvink as Minister of Social; Affairs and Health
- Succeeded by: Wil Albeda

Member of the European Parliament
- In office 8 May 1967 – 6 July 1971
- Parliamentary group: Christian Democratic Group
- Constituency: Netherlands

Member of the House of Representatives
- In office 16 January 1978 – 1 November 1978
- In office 8 June 1977 – 8 September 1977
- In office 7 December 1972 – 7 March 1973
- In office 15 September 1964 – 6 July 1971
- Parliamentary group: Anti-Revolutionary Party

Personal details
- Born: Jacob Boersma; 2 December 1929 Leeuwarden, Netherlands
- Died: 6 March 2012 (aged 82) Amsterdam, Netherlands
- Party: Anti-Revolutionary Party (until 1980)
- Other political affiliations: See list: Independent Christian Democrat (from 1996) Labour Party (1989–1996) Independent Christian Democrat (1980–1989) Christian Democratic Appeal (1980)
- Spouses: Gerardina Aangeenbrug (m. 1950; div. 1978) Alice Oppenheim (m. 1979; div. 1980) Ella van Soest (m. 1981)
- Children: 2 daughters and 1 son (first marriage)
- Education: Free University Amsterdam (Bachelor of Economics, Master of Economics)
- Occupation: Politician · Civil servant · Economist · Financial adviser · Businessman · Corporate director · Nonprofit director · Trade Union leader · Author

Jacob "Jaap" Boersma (2 December 1929 – 6 March 2012) was a Dutch politician of the defunct Anti-Revolutionary Party (ARP) now merged into the Christian Democratic Appeal (CDA) party and economist.

Boersma attended a Gymnasium in Leeuwarden from May 1942 until June 1947 and applied at the Rotterdam School of Economics in June 1947 majoring in Economics before transferring to the Free University Amsterdam in July 1948 obtaining a Bachelor of Economics degree in June 1949 before graduating with a Master of Economics degree in July 1953. Boersma worked a financial adviser for the National Christian Trade unions (CNV) from July 1953 until September 1964.

Boersma became a Member of the House of Representatives after the resignation of Jan van Eibergen, taking office on 15 September 1964 serving as a frontbencher chairing the special parliamentary committee for Law amendments and spokesperson for Economic Affairs, Health, Social Affairs and Environmental policy. Boersma was selected as a Member of the European Parliament and dual served in those positions, taking office on 8 May 1967. After the election of 1971 Boersma was appointed as Minister of Social Affairs in the Cabinet Biesheuvel I, taking office on 6 July 1971. The Cabinet Biesheuvel I fell just one year later on 19 July 1972 and continued to serve in a demissionary capacity until the first cabinet formation of 1972 when it was replaced by the caretaker Cabinet Biesheuvel II with Boersma continuing as Minister of Social Affairs, taking office on 9 August 1972. Boersma served as acting Minister of Agriculture and Fisheries from 1 January 1973 until 11 May 1973 following the appointment of Pierre Lardinois as European Commissioner. After the election of 1972 Boersma returned as a Member of the House of Representatives, taking office on 7 December 1972 but he was still serving in the cabinet and because of dualism customs in the constitutional convention of Dutch politics he couldn't serve a dual mandate he subsequently resigned as a Member of the House of Representatives on 7 March 1973. Following the second cabinet formation of 1972 Boersma continued as Minister of Social Affairs in the Cabinet Den Uyl, taking office on 11 May 1973. The Cabinet Den Uyl fell on 22 March 1977 after four years of tensions in the coalition and continued to serve in a demissionary capacity. After the election of 1977 Boersma again returned as a Member of the House of Representatives, taking office on 8 June 1977 but because of the dualism customs he resigned as Member of the House of Representatives on 8 September 1977. Following the cabinet formation of 1977 Boersma was not giving a cabinet post in the new cabinet, the Cabinet Den Uyl was replaced by the Cabinet Van Agt-Wiegel on 19 December 1977 and he subsequently returned as a Member of the House of Representatives following the appointment of Jan de Koning as Minister for Development Cooperation in the new cabinet, taking office on 16 January 1978 serving as a backbencher until his resignation 1 November 1978.

Boerma retired from national politics and became active in the private sector and public sector and occupied numerous seats as a corporate director and nonprofit director on several boards of directors and supervisory boards (Overseas Gas and Electric Company (OGEM), International Institute of Social History, Transnational Institute and the municipality of Amsterdam) and served on several state commissions and councils on behalf of the government (Advisory Council for Spatial Planning and Public Pension Funds APB).

Boerma was known for his abilities as a debater and policy wonk. Boerma continued to comment on political affairs until his is death at the age of 82 and holds the distinction as the third longest-serving Minister of Social Affairs with 6 years, 166 days.

== Decorations ==
Honours
Ribbon bar	Honour	Country	Date
	Commander of the Order of Orange-Nassau	Netherlands	11 April 1978

Political offices
Preceded by Bauke Roolvink as Minister of Social; Affairs and Health	Minister of Social Affairs; 1971–1977	Succeeded by Wil Albeda
Preceded by Pierre Lardinois	Minister of Agriculture and Fisheries; Ad interim 1973	Succeeded by Tiemen Brouwer
