= Koos Rietkerk =

Dutch politician

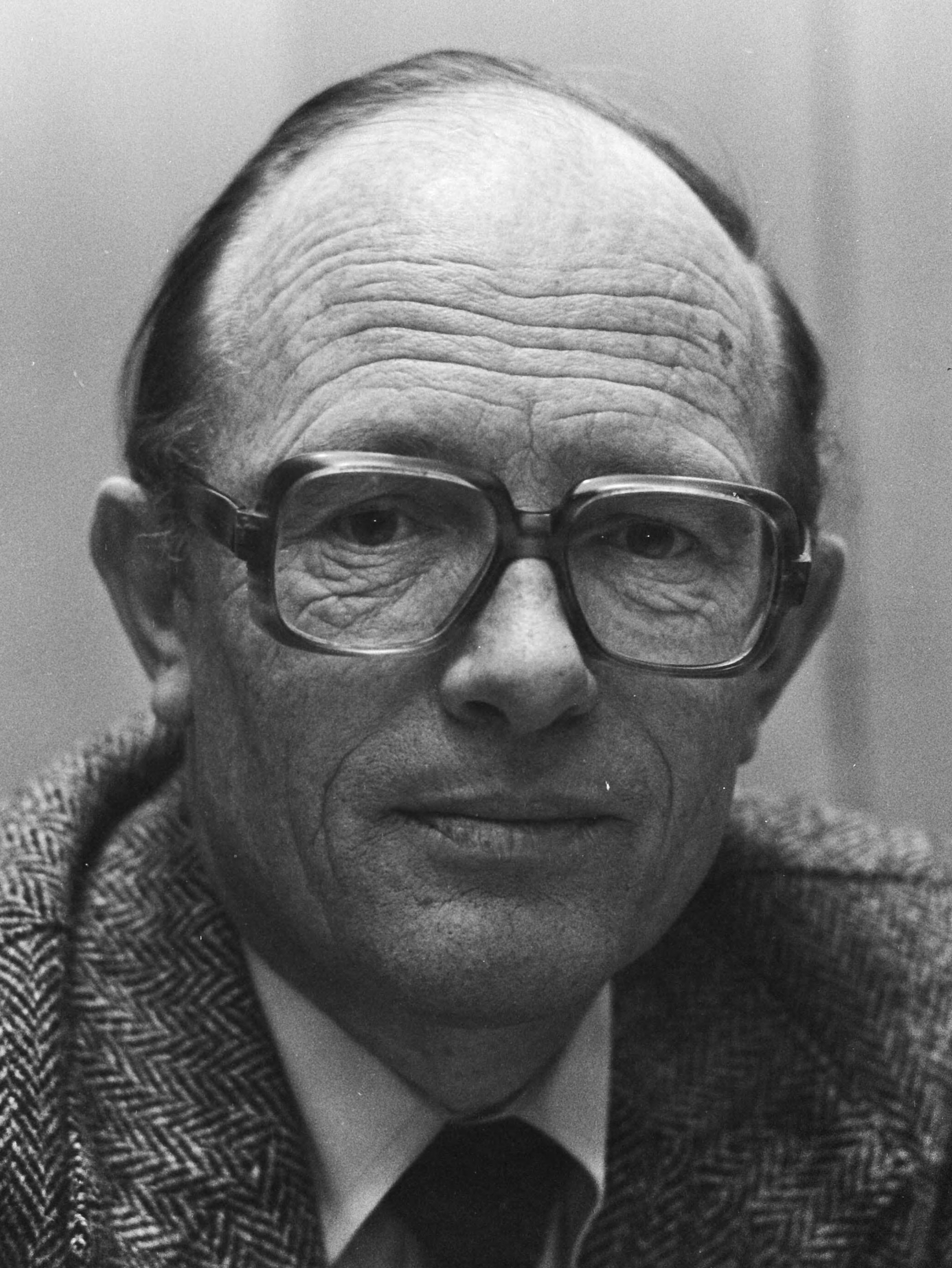
- Koos Rietkerk in 1977

Minister of the Interior
- In office 4 November 1982 – 20 February 1986
- Prime Minister: Ruud Lubbers
- Preceded by: Max Rood
- Succeeded by: Frits Korthals Altes (Ad interim)

Parliamentary leader in the House of Representatives
- In office 19 December 1977 – 25 August 1981
- Preceded by: Hans Wiegel
- Succeeded by: Hans Wiegel
- Parliamentary group: People's Party for Freedom and Democracy

State Secretary for Social Affairs
- In office 28 July 1971 – 23 April 1973
- Prime Minister: Barend Biesheuvel
- Preceded by: Roelof Kruisinga as State Secretary for Social Affairs and Health
- Succeeded by: Jan Mertens

Member of the House of Representatives
- In office 11 September 1974 – 4 November 1982
- In office 23 January 1973 – 1 September 1973
- In office 23 February 1967 – 28 July 1971
- Parliamentary group: People's Party for Freedom and Democracy

Member of the Social and Economic Council
- In office 1 September 1973 – 1 September 1974
- Chairman: Jan de Pous
- In office 30 January 1959 – 23 February 1967
- Chairman: Gerard Verrijn Stuart (1959–1964); Jan de Pous (1964–1967)

Personal details
- Born: Jacobus Gijsbert Rietkerk; 14 December 1927 Boskoop, Netherlands
- Died: 20 February 1986 (aged 58) The Hague, Netherlands
- Cause of death: Heart attack
- Party: People's Party for Freedom and Democracy (from 1958)
- Other political affiliations: Anti-Revolutionary Party (1946–1958)
- Spouse: Johanna Zwiers (m. 1953)
- Children: 2 daughters and 1 son
- Relatives: Jan Rietkerk (brother); Theo Rietkerk (nephew)
- Education: Leiden University (Bachelor of Laws, Master of Laws)
- Occupation: Politician · Civil servant · Jurist · Lawyer · Researcher · Trade association executive

Jacobus Gijsbert "Koos" Rietkerk (14 December 1927 – 20 February 1986) was a Dutch politician of the People's Party for Freedom and Democracy (VVD) and jurist.

== Biography ==
Rietkerk attended the Christian Gymnasium in Haarlem from April 1940 until May 1946 and applied at the Leiden University in June 1946 majoring in Law and obtaining a Bachelor of Laws degree in June 1948 and worked as a student researcher before graduating with a Master of Laws degree in July 1952. Rietkerk worked as a lawyer in Haarlem from January 1953 until October 1956 and also worked as a civil servant for the Immigration and Naturalisation Service (IND) of the Ministry of Justice from January 1953 until October 1956. Rietkerk worked as legal advisor for the Municipalities association (VNG) from October 1956 until January 1959. Rietkerk worked as a trade association executive for the Christian Employers' association (NCW) and served as General-Secretary of the Executive Board from January 1959 until February 1967.

Rietkerk was elected as a Member of the House of Representatives after the election of 1967, taking office on 23 February 1967 serving as a frontbencher and spokesperson for Justice, Social Affairs and the Ombudsman. After the election of 1971 Rietkerk was appointed as State Secretary for Social Affairs in the Cabinet Biesheuvel I, taking office on 28 July 1971. The Cabinet Biesheuvel I fell just one year later on 19 July 1972 and continued to serve in a demissionary capacity until the first cabinet formation of 1972 when it was replaced by the caretaker Cabinet Biesheuvel II with Scholten continuing as State Secretary for Finance, taking office on 9 August 1972. After the election of 1972 Rietkerk returned as a Member of the House of Representatives, taking office on 23 January 1973 but he was still serving in the cabinet and because of dualism customs in the constitutional convention of Dutch politics he couldn't serve a dual mandate he subsequently resigned as State Secretary for Social Affairs on 23 April 1973 and he continued to serve in the House of Representatives as a frontbencher and spokesperson for Justice, Social Affairs and the Ombudsman. In August 1973 Rietkerk was nominated as General-Secretary of the Executive Board of the Industry and Employers' association (VNO), he resigned as a Member of the House of Representatives the same day he was installed as General-Secretary on 1 September 1973. Rietkerk returned as a Member of the House of Representatives following the appointment of Henk Vonhoff as Mayor of Utrecht, he resigned as General-Secretary of the Industry and Employers' association on 1 September 1974 taking office on 11 September 1974 again serving as a frontbencher and spokesperson for Justice, Social Affairs and the Ombudsman. After the election of 1977 the Leader of the People's Party for Freedom and Democracy and Parliamentary leader of the People's Party for Freedom and Democracy in the House of Representatives Hans Wiegel was appointed Deputy Prime Minister and Minister of the Interior in the Cabinet Van Agt-Wiegel, the People's Party for Freedom and Democracy leadership approached Rietkerk as his successor as Parliamentary leader, Rietkerk accepted and became the Parliamentary leader, taking office on 19 December 1977. After the election of 1981 Hans Wiegel returned as Parliamentary leader on 25 August 1981 and he again served as a frontbencher chairing the parliamentary committee for Kingdom Relations and the parliamentary committee for the Ombudsman. After the election of 1982 Rietkerk was appointed as Minister of the Interior in the Cabinet Lubbers I, taking office on 4 November 1982. On 20 February 1986 Rietkerk died after suffering a fatal Heart attack during a meeting in his office at the Ministry of the Interior at the age of 58.

Rietkerk was known for his abilities as a manager and negotiator. He holds the distinction as the second longest-serving Parliamentary leader of the People's Party for Freedom and Democracy in the House of Representatives who wasn't also the Leader with 3 years, 249 days.

== Decorations ==
Honours
Ribbon bar	Honour	Country	Date
	Knight of the Order of the Netherlands Lion	Netherlands	8 June 1973
	Grand Officer of the Order of Leopold II	Belgium	13 September 1983

Party political offices
Preceded by Hans Wiegel	Parliamentary leader of the People's Party for Freedom and Democracy in the House of Representatives; 1977–1981	Succeeded by Hans Wiegel
Political offices
Preceded by Roelof Kruisinga as State Secretary for Social Affairs and Health	State Secretary for Social Affairs; 1971–1973	Succeeded by Jan Mertens
Preceded by Max Rood	Minister of the Interior; 1982–1986	Succeeded by Frits Korthals Altes; Ad interim
Business positions
Unknown	General-Secretary of the Executive Board of the Christian Employers' association 1959–1967	Unknown
Unknown	General-Secretary of the Executive Board of the Industry and Employers' association 1973–1974	Unknown
