= Jan Mertens (Catholic People's Party) =

Dutch politician (1916–2000)

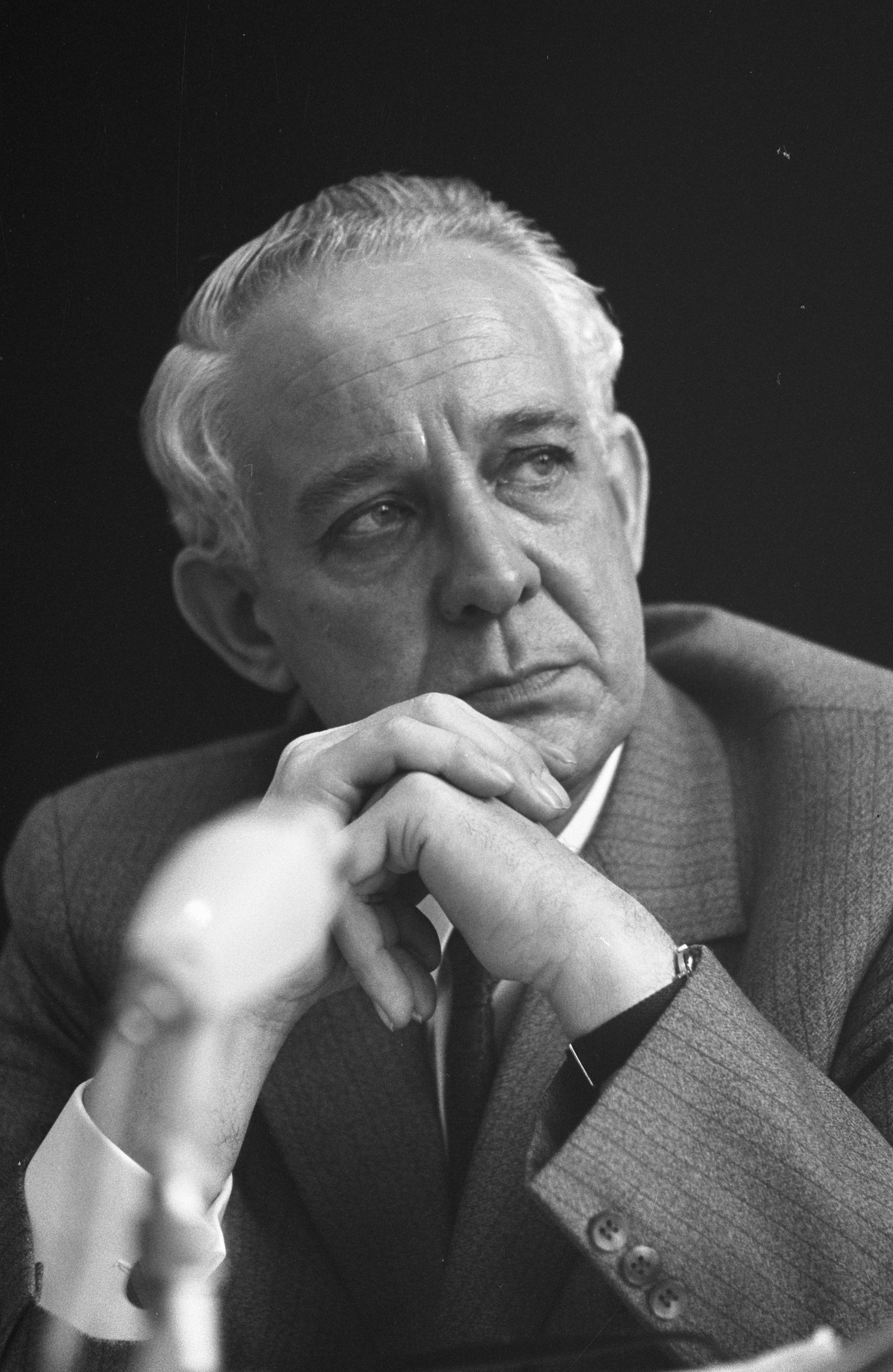
- Mertens in 1964

State Secretary for Social Affairs
- In office 11 May 1973 – 19 December 1977
- Prime Minister: Joop den Uyl
- Preceded by: Koos Rietkerk
- Succeeded by: Louw de Graaf

Personal details
- Born: Petrus Joseph Johannus van den Berk; 14 July 1916 Heerlen, Netherlands
- Died: 2 August 2000 (aged 84) Oosterhout, Netherlands
- Party: Catholic People's Party (until 1980)
- Other political affiliations: Christian Democratic Appeal (from 1980)
- Spouse: Maria Philippina "Riet" Dekkers (m. 1947)
- Children: 8 sons and 2 daughters
- Occupation: Politician; Trade Union leader; Nonprofit director; Activist

Petrus Joseph Johannes "Jan" Mertens (né van den Berk; (14 July 1916 – 2 August 2000) was a Dutch politician of the Catholic People's Party (KVP). He served as State Secretary for Social Affairs from 11 May 1973 until 19 December 1977 in the Cabinet Den Uyl.

Political offices
Preceded by Koos Rietkerk	State Secretary for Social Affairs; 1973–1977	Succeeded by Louw de Graaf
