= Louw de Graaf =

Dutch politician (1930–2020)

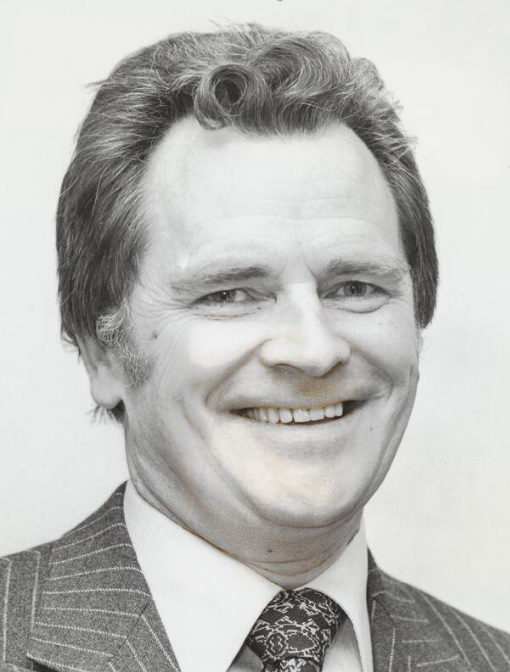
- De Graaf in 1977

Minister of Social Affairs and Employment
- In office 3 February 1987 – 6 May 1987; Ad interim
- Prime Minister: Ruud Lubbers
- Preceded by: Jan de Koning
- Succeeded by: Jan de Koning
- In office 29 May 1982 – 4 November 1982
- Prime Minister: Dries van Agt
- Preceded by: Joop den Uyl
- Succeeded by: Jan de Koning

Member of the House of Representatives
- In office 3 June 1986 – 14 July 1986
- In office 16 September 1982 – 5 November 1982
- In office 10 June 1981 – 29 May 1982

State Secretary for Social Affairs and Employment
- In office 6 May 1987 – 1 October 1989
- Prime Minister: Ruud Lubbers
- Preceded by: Himself
- Succeeded by: Elske ter Veld
- In office 5 November 1982 – 3 February 1987 Serving with Annelien Kappeyne van de Coppello (1982–1986)
- Prime Minister: Ruud Lubbers
- Preceded by: Piet van Zeil
- Succeeded by: Himself
- In office 28 December 1977 – 11 September 1981
- Prime Minister: Dries van Agt
- Preceded by: Jan Mertens
- Succeeded by: Ien Dales; Hedy d'Ancona

Member of the Social and Economic Council
- In office 1 July 1970 – 28 December 1977
- Chairman: Jan de Pous

Personal details
- Born: 12 April 1930 Kootstertille, Netherlands
- Died: 15 July 2020 (aged 90) Heerenveen, Netherlands
- Party: Christian Democratic Appeal (from 1980)
- Other political affiliations: Anti-Revolutionary Party (1951–1980)
- Occupation: Politician · civil servant · Nonprofit director · Trade union leader

Louw de Graaf (12 April 1930 – 15 July 2020) was a Dutch politician of the Anti-Revolutionary Party (ARP) and later the Christian Democratic Appeal (CDA) party and trade union leader.

De Graaf worked as a trade union leader for the Christian National Trade Union Federation (CNV) from September 1955 until December 1977 and served as General-Secretary from May 1970 until December 1977.

After the election of 1977 De Graaf was appointed as State Secretary for Social Affairs in the Van Agt–Wiegel cabinet, taking office on 28 December 1977. De Graaf was elected to the House of Representatives in the election of 1981, taking office on 10 June 1981. Following the cabinet formation of 1981 De Graaf was not given a cabinet post in the new cabinet, the Van Agt–Wiegel cabinet was replaced by the Van Agt II cabinet on 11 September 1981 and he continued to serve in the House of Representatives as a frontbencher and deputy spokesperson for social affairs and employment. On 12 May 1982 the Van Agt II cabinet fell just seven months into its term and continued to serve in a demissionary capacity until the first cabinet formation of 1982 when it was replaced by the caretaker Van Agt III cabinet with De Graaf's appointment as Minister of Social Affairs and Employment, taking office on 29 May 1982.

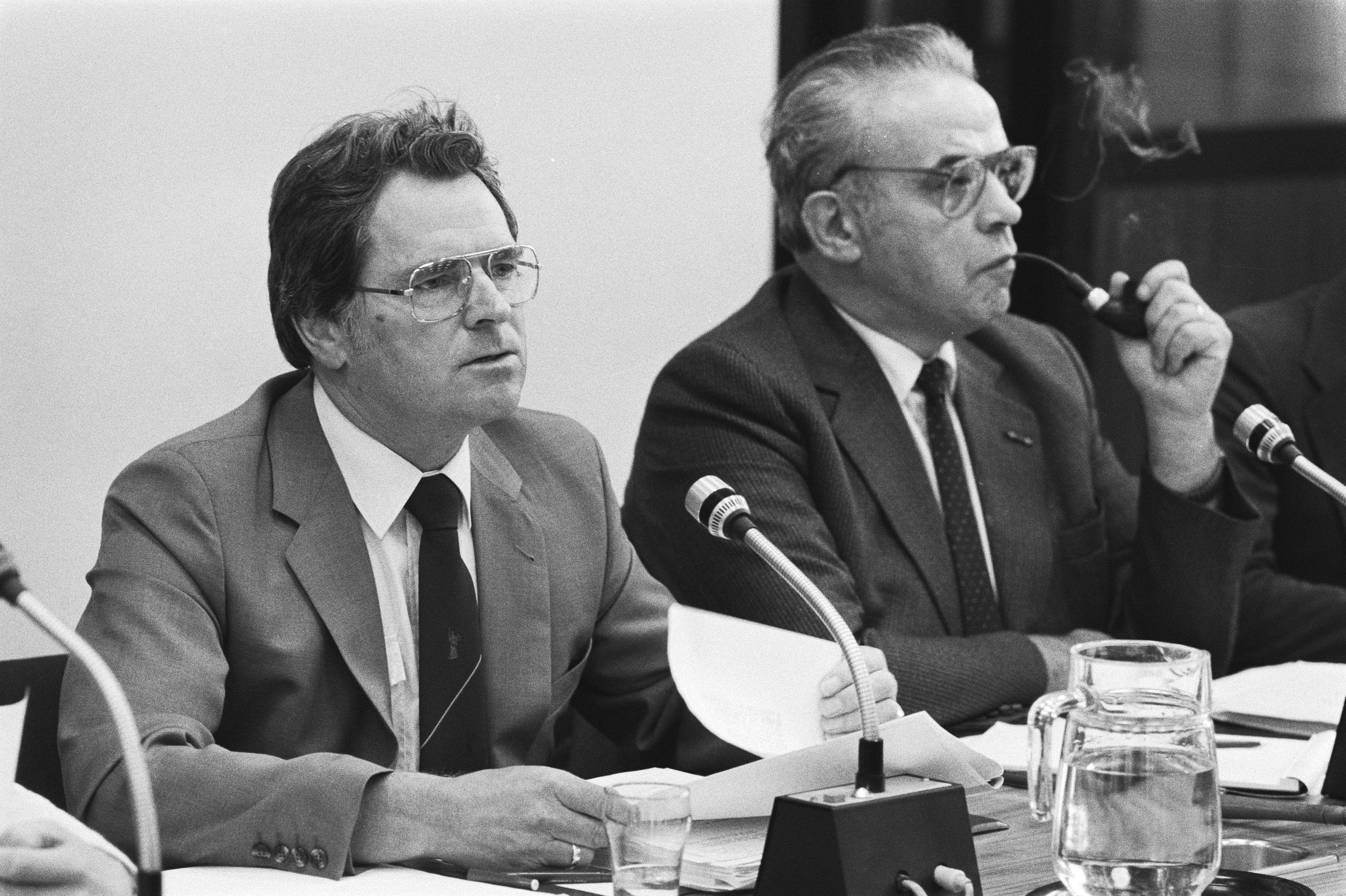
De Graaf (left) in 1982 as Minister of Social Affairs

After the election of 1982, De Graaf returned to the House of Representatives, taking office on 16 September 1982. Following the second cabinet formation of 1982 De Graaf was again appointed as State Secretary for Social Affairs and Employment in the Lubbers I cabinet, taking office on 5 November 1982. After the election of 1986 De Graaf again returned as a Member of the House of Representatives, taking office on 3 June 1986. Following the cabinet formation of 1986 De Graaf continued as State Secretary for Social Affairs and Employment in the Lubbers II cabinet, taking office on 14 July 1986. De Graaf served as acting Minister of Social Affairs and Employment from 3 February 1987 until 6 May 1987 following the appointment of Jan de Koning as acting Minister of the Interior during a medical leave of absence of Kees van Dijk. The Lubbers II cabinet fell on 3 May 1989 following a disagreement in the coalition about the increase of tariffs and excises and continued to serve in a demissionary capacity. In July 1989 De Graaf announced that he would not stand for the election of 1989.

In September 1989 De Graaf was nominated as a Chairman of the Supervisory board of the National Health Care Institute, he resigned as State Secretary for Social Affairs and Employment the same day he was installed as chairman, serving from 1 October 1989 until 1 July 2003.

== Decorations ==
Honours
Ribbon bar	Honour	Country	Date	Comment
	Officer of the Order of Orange-Nassau	Netherlands	30 April 1977	
	Commander of the Order of the Netherlands Lion	Netherlands	20 November 1989	

Political offices
Preceded by Jan Mertens	State Secretary for Social; Affairs and Employment; 1977–1981	Succeeded by Ien Dales; Hedy d'Ancona
Preceded by Piet van Zeil	State Secretary for Social; Affairs and Employment; 1982–1987; With: Annelien Kappeyne van de Coppello (1982–1986)	Succeeded by Himself
Preceded by Himself	State Secretary for Social; Affairs and Employment; 1987–1989	Succeeded by Elske ter Veld
Preceded by Joop den Uyl	Minister of Social Affairs and Employment; 1982	Succeeded by Jan de Koning
Preceded by Jan de Koning	Minister of Social Affairs and Employment; 1987; Ad interim	Succeeded by Jan de Koning
Civic offices
Unknown	Chairman of the Supervisory board of the National Health Care Institute; 1989–2003	Succeeded by Dik Hermans
Non-profit organization positions
Preceded by Wil Albeda; 1966	General-Secretary of the Christian National Trade Union Federation; 1970–1970	Unknown
