= Annelien Kappeyne van de Coppello =

Dutch politician

Her Excellency Annelien Kappeyne van de Coppello
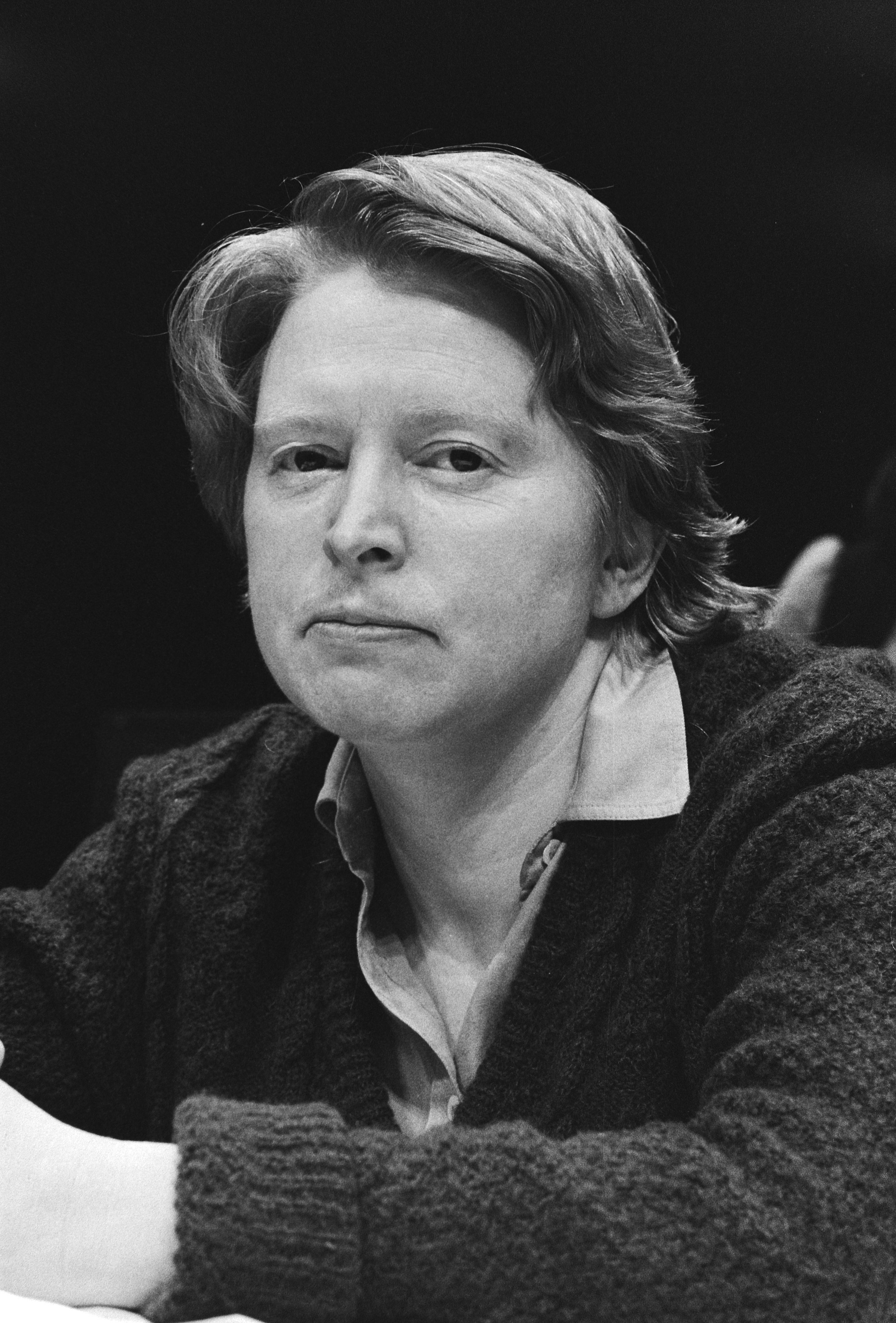
- Kappeyne van de Coppello in 1981

Member of the Council of State
- In office 1 March 1988 – 23 February 1990
- Vice President: Willem Scholten

State Secretary for Social Affairs and Employment
- In office 8 November 1982 – 14 July 1986 Serving with Louw de Graaf
- Prime Minister: Ruud Lubbers
- Preceded by: Piet van Zeil
- Succeeded by: Louw de Graaf

Member of the House of Representatives
- In office 11 May 1971 – 10 June 1981

Personal details
- Born: Annelien Kappeyne van de Coppello; 24 October 1936 Loenen aan de Vecht, Netherlands
- Died: 23 February 1990 (aged 53) Leiden, Netherlands
- Cause of death: Cancer
- Party: People's Party for Freedom and Democracy (from 1962)
- Relatives: Jan Kappeyne van de Coppello (first uncle once removed)
- Education: Leiden University (Bachelor of Laws, Master of Laws)
- Occupation: Politician · Jurist · Lawyer · Historian · Political pundit · Activist · Author

Annelien Kappeyne van de Coppello (24 October 1936 – 23 February 1990) was a Dutch politician of the People's Party for Freedom and Democracy (VVD).

She was actively involved in politics from 1966 to 1990, first on the municipal council of Leiden, then served as a member of the House in the Dutch Parliament, as a State Secretary of the First Lubbers cabinet, and finally was an advisor on the Council of State. Kappeyne was in favor of abolition of the death penalty, abortion, equal pay, euthanasia and right of a person to control their own body. She favored maintaining an electoral system based on proportional representation and believed that foreign residents should have a say in local government. She was an advocate on the national level for protecting the legal rights of immigrants, dual nationals and LGBT constituents. In 1985, she was the first person to introduce lesbianism at an official United Nations conference, calling for measures to denounce discrimination against lesbians and protect their rights. She was inducted into the Order of the Dutch Lion as a knight in 1986.

== Early life ==
Annelien Kappeyne van de Coppello was born on 24 October 1936 in the hamlet of Oud Over near Loenen aan de Vecht, in the Utrecht Province of the Netherlands to Theodora Elisabeth Catharina Maria van Panhuijs and Nicolaas Johannes Cornelis Marie Kappeyne van de Coppello. Her father was a banker, who later became an attorney and practised in Amsterdam. Her paternal grandfather was Jacobus Kappeyne van de Coppello, who was a member of the Dutch Senate and his wife, Martha Maria Benten was active in the early women's movement in the Netherlands. After completing her primary education, Kappeyne entered the Utrechts Stedelijk Gymnasium in 1948, graduating in 1955. She spent a year working in Lausanne, Switzerland and then returned to the Netherlands and entered Leiden University in 1956 to study law. She was extremely active in the Association for Female Students of Leiden and the Student Parliament. Kappeyne joined the VVD in 1962 and graduated in 1966 with a speciality in parliamentary history.

== Career ==
By September 1966, Kappeyne had secured a position on the Leiden municipal council on which she served until 1974. Simultaneously, she acquired a paid-staff position for the VVD working in the internal affairs area of constitutional review and electoral rights. From 1969, she served as the assistant secretary of the VVD constituency in the Dutch House of Representatives and then in 1971 took a seat in the House. In 1976, she was a vocal supporter in the debate on the abortion and later that same year, gained wide notice when she called into question the handling of the paperwork by the Deputy Prime Minister Dries van Agt for the Nazi war criminal Pieter Menten, which allowed Menten to escape arrest. Because, as a woman, she questioned a high ranking minister, she was asked to provide medical evidence to explain her aggressiveness toward van Agt, though ultimately she exposed his failure to properly facilitate the arrest. The following year, she was asked to become a State Secretary, but refused as she did not want to serve in the cabinet of van Agt, when he became Prime Minister of the Netherlands.

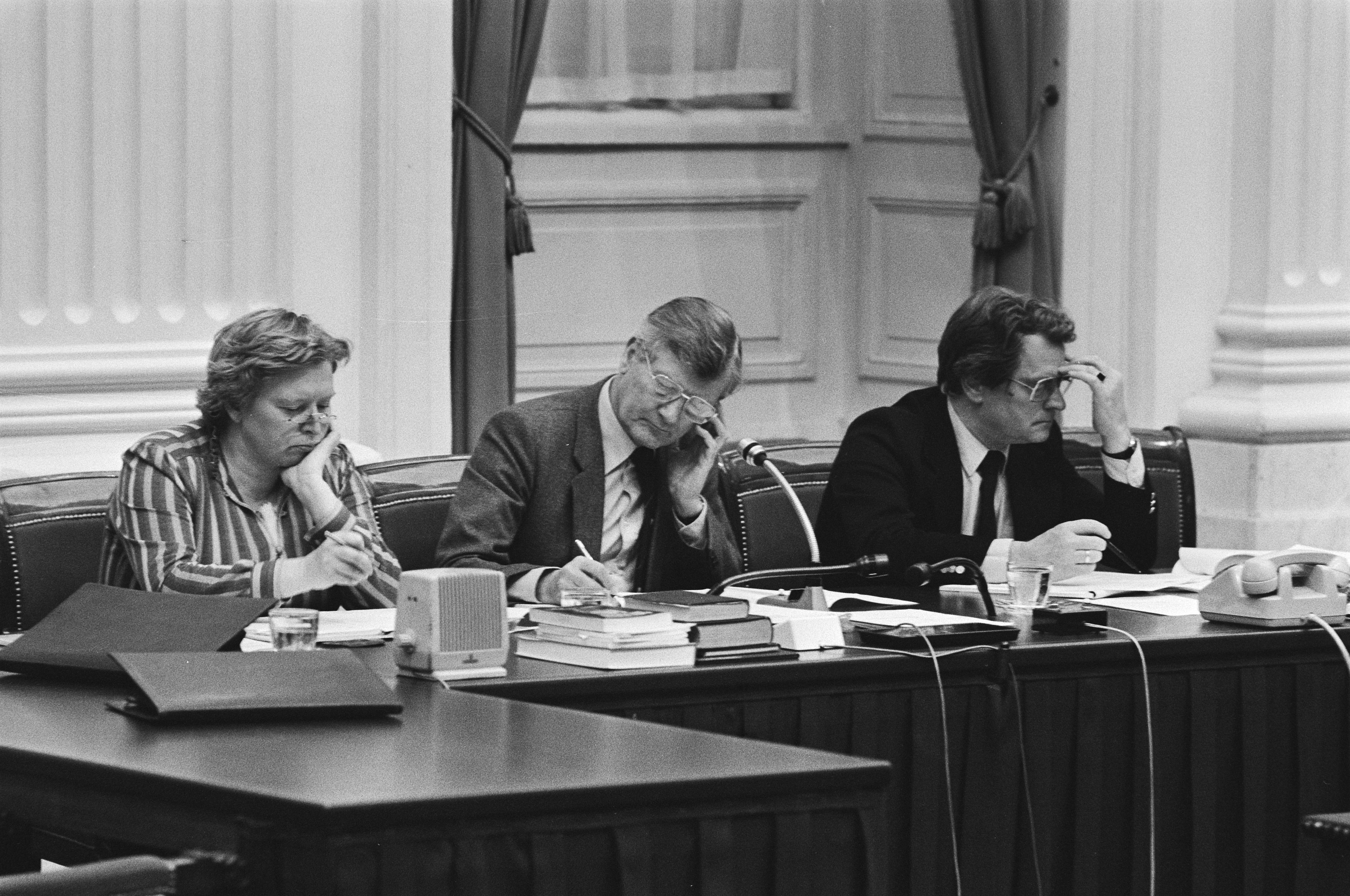
State Secretary for Social Affairs and Employment Annelien Kappeyne van de Coppello, Minister of Social Affairs and Employment Jan de Koning and State Secretary for Social Affairs and Employment Louw de Graaf in the House of Representatives on 27 November 1984.

During debates on Dutch citizens living abroad which occurred at the end of the 1970s, Kapeyne was a supporter of allowing them to repatriate, especially if they had given up citizenship because of policy and their new home enacted policies they disagreed with. She used as an example a Dutch national who had given up citizenship to live in South Africa and wanted to repatriate because of Apartheid. She advocated to maintain a system which supported proportional representation in government and was opposed to a district system, which might create inequalities. When constitutional debate was held on the inviolability of the human body, Kapeyne worked across party lines, though it was unusual for the era, to press for approval. She believed that it was an innate right for a person to make decisions on their own body, which included abortion, euthanasia, and organ donation. Her efforts in amending the constitution, ensured that right for all Dutch citizens and was one of her most important contributions as a legislator.

In 1981, Kappeyne left the legislature after a series of policy disputes with her party. The first disagreement was over the reinstatement of the death penalty, which she opposed, and the second was in regard to whether foreigners should be allowed to participate in municipal elections. She believed that as a tolerant nation, the Netherlands should allow those willing to take part in government to do so and saw those who would forbid their participation as evidence of rising xenophobia. She went to work at the Veronica Broadcasting Organization as a manager of staffing and company facilities, but quickly found the culture not to her liking and returned to the House in 1982 during the First Lubbers cabinet, as State Secretary for Social Affairs and Employment.

Though she did not consider herself to be a feminist, Kappeyne often tackled issues which were important to women. She advocated for the government to increase the number of women who were involved in government and civil positions, equal hiring practices, prohibitions of sexual violence against women and girls, legal protections for marital rape victims, equal payment of state benefits for pensions and other benefits. She was one of the Dutch delegates to the World Conference on Women in 1985, which was a part of the United Nations programs for the Decade of Women to evaluate the status of women and establish protocols to enable women real access to socio-economic, cultural, legal and political parity. She made history at the conference by introducing, for the first time at an official UN Conference, the concept of lesbian rights, calling for an end to discrimination and protection of their legal rights. Kappeyne helped shepherd the Emancipation Plan Domestic Affairs, which had been introduced by her predecessor, Hedy d'Ancona. The plan, approved in 1985, provided for improvement in efforts to help women attain economic independence by ensuring gender equality, changing organizational structures which favored gender imbalance, and re-imaging the perception of femininity and masculinity. That same year, she introduced the concept of flexible parental leave.

In 1986, Kappeyne left the legislature and was honored as a knight in the Order of the Dutch Lion. The following year, she became a member of the Council of State, the main advisory body to the Dutch government. On 21 June 1988 she married the journalist Hillebrand Folkert de Groen.

== Death and legacy ==
In early 1990, Kappeyne was diagnosed with cancer. She died on 23 February 1990 in Leiden and was remembered by her former classmate, Queen Beatrix, who presented a royal wreath for the funeral. A foundation bearing her name was established in the year of her death, which contributes to the development and social cohesion of the diverse Dutch society. In 2006, Martijn van der Kooij published a biography of Kappeyne, Strijdvaardig en eigenzinnig, ("Combative and unwilling"), which discussed her unyielding positions on matters that were important to her.

== Decorations ==
Honours
Ribbon bar	Honour	Country	Date	Comment
	Knight of the Order of the Netherlands Lion	Netherlands	26 August 1986	

Political offices
Preceded by Piet van Zeil	State Secretary for Social; Affairs and Employment; 1982–1986; With: Louw de Graaf	Succeeded by Louw de Graaf
