= Ien Dales =

Dutch politician (1931–1994)

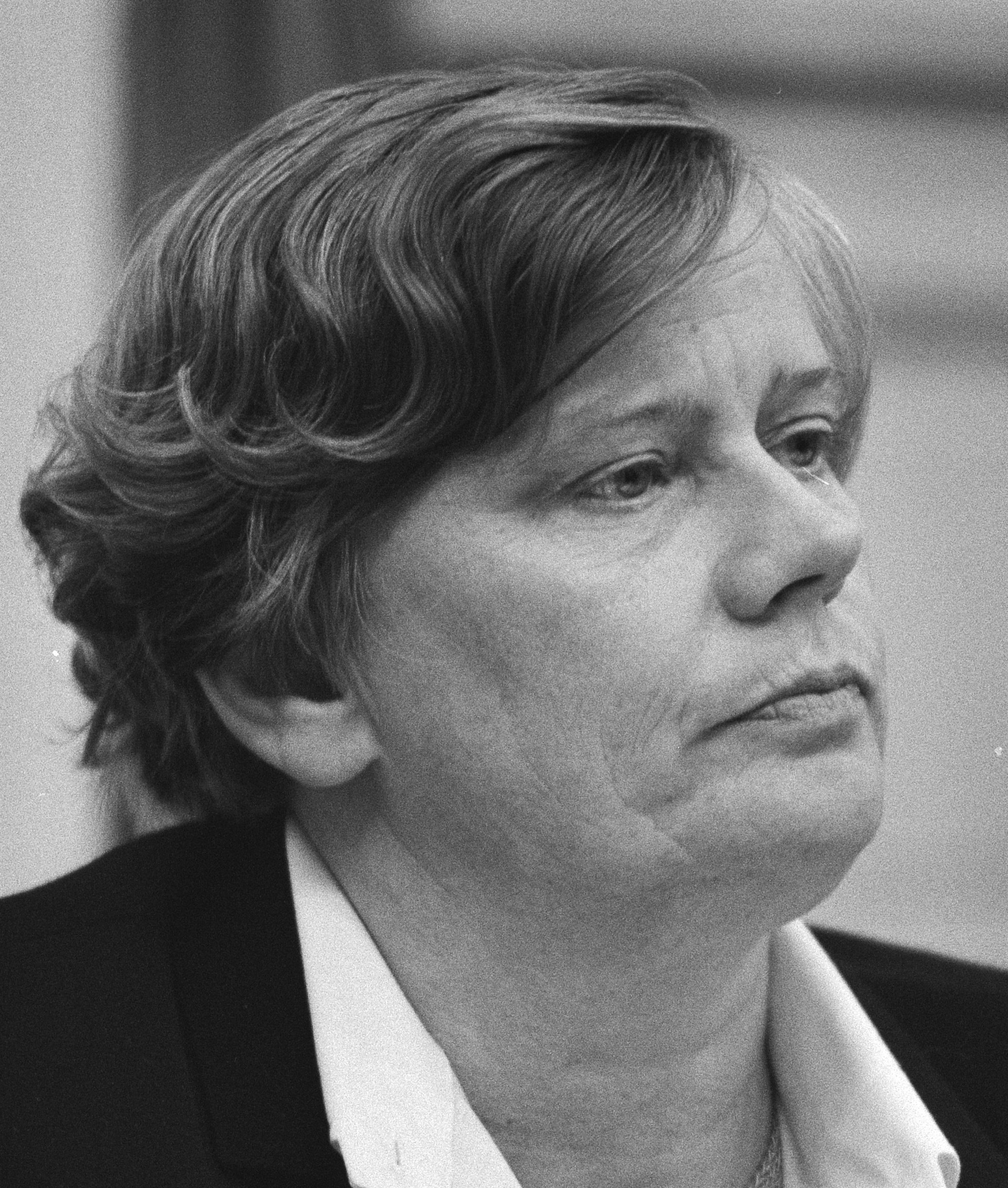
- Dales in 1981

Minister of the Interior
- In office 7 November 1989 – 10 January 1994
- Prime Minister: Ruud Lubbers
- Preceded by: Kees van Dijk
- Succeeded by: Ernst Hirsch Ballin (interim)

Mayor of Nijmegen
- In office 16 May 1987 – 7 November 1989
- Preceded by: Frans Hermsen
- Succeeded by: Ed d'Hondt

Member of the House of Representatives
- In office 16 September 1982 – 16 May 1987

State Secretary for Social Affairs and Employment
- In office 11 September 1981 – 29 May 1982 Serving with Hedy d'Ancona
- Prime Minister: Dries van Agt
- Preceded by: Louw de Graaf (as State Secretary for Social Affairs)
- Succeeded by: Piet van Zeil

Personal details
- Born: Catharina Isabella Dales; 18 October 1931 Arnhem, Netherlands
- Died: 10 January 1994 (aged 62) Utrecht, Netherlands
- Cause of death: Heart attack
- Party: Labour Party (from 1968)
- Domestic partner: Elizabeth Schmitz (1981–1994)
- Education: University of Amsterdam
- Occupation: Politician · Civil servant · Social worker

Catharina Isabella "Ien" Dales (18 October 1931 – 10 January 1994) was a Dutch politician and social worker. Born in Arnhem, she received a degree in education from the University of Amsterdam and worked in social services before her career in politics. She became a member of the Labour Party (PvdA) in 1968 and was appointed State Secretary for Social Affairs and Employment in the Van Agt II cabinet, a position that she held between 1981 and 1982. Dales was a member of the House of Representatives between 1981 and 1987 and mayor of Nijmegen between 1987 and 1989. She was the Minister of the Interior in the Lubbers III cabinet from 1989 and 1994.

== Early life ==
Dales was born on 18 October 1931 in Arnhem, Netherlands. Her father was Teunis Dales, who owned a business selling construction supplies and her mother was Wilhelmina Bertha Holstigen. She was the eldest of three children, with a younger brother and sister. The family were well off and she attended a public primary school. When Dales was ten, her father died of appendicitis and her mother had to go to work.

Dales began her secondary studies at the public Hogere Burgerschool in Arnhem. She received an HBS-A diploma in 1947 and, intending to study medicine at university, an HBS-B diploma in 1950, but she was unable to afford to attend university. Having grown up in the Dutch Reformed faith, she decided to train as a youth church leader. She received a scholarship to attend the Church and World Academy in Driebergen, the largest church training programme in the country, in the 1950s. While studying, she was strongly influenced by her teacher Willem Banning, a co-founder of the Labour Party (PvdA).

She received a diploma in theology and preaching, and received a degree in education from the University of Amsterdam in 1975. Dales also worked for the Church and World Organisation between 1956 and 1974, starting as a course teacher, before becoming the deputy head and head of the education department and director of the organisation. She worked as a freelance researcher between 1 January 1975 until 1 September 1977.

== Political career ==
Dales joined the PvdA in 1968. She was appointed the director of social services for the municipality of Rotterdam by one of the aldermen, Elizabeth Schmitz, following the discovery of widespread fraud in the department, with the challenge of re-organising the system. She held this position from 1 September 1977 and 11 September 1981.

Following the 1981 general election, she was appointed the State Secretary for Social Affairs and Employment in the Van Agt II cabinet, taking office on 11 September 1981, with special responsibility for social security. The Van Agt II cabinet dissolved just seven months into its term on 12 May 1982 and continued to serve in a demissionary capacity until it was replaced by the caretaker Van Agt III cabinet on 29 May 1982.

Dales was elected as a member of the House of Representatives after the 1982 general election, taking office on 16 September 1982. She was the chair of the committee on petitions and the committee on the police. She held this position until 16 May 1987, the day that she took office as the mayor of Nijmegen. She was mayor until 7 November 1989.

After the 1989 general election, Dales was appointed the Minister of the Interior in the Lubbers III cabinet, taking office on 7 November 1989. She held this position until 10 January 1994.

== Death and legacy ==
Dales died on 10 January 1994 in Utrecht. She was the second known LGBT government minister in the Netherlands. She was in a relationship with fellow Labour Party politician Elizabeth Schmitz. For many years this fact was an open secret in Dutch politics at that time.

== Decorations ==
Honours
Ribbon bar	Honour	Country	Date
	Knight of the Order of the Netherlands Lion	Netherlands	9 September 1982

Political offices
Preceded by Louw de Graaf as State Secretary for Social Affairs	State Secretary for Social Affairs and Employment; 1981–1982; With: Hedy d'Ancona	Succeeded by Piet van Zeil
Preceded by Frans Hermsen	Mayor of Nijmegen; 1987–1989	Succeeded by Ed d'Hondt
Preceded by Kees van Dijk	Minister of the Interior; 1989–1994	Succeeded by Ernst Hirsch Ballin; Ad interim
