= List of ministers of social affairs of the Netherlands =

Minister of Social Affairs and Employment of the Netherlands
- Minister van Sociale Zaken en Werkgelegenheid
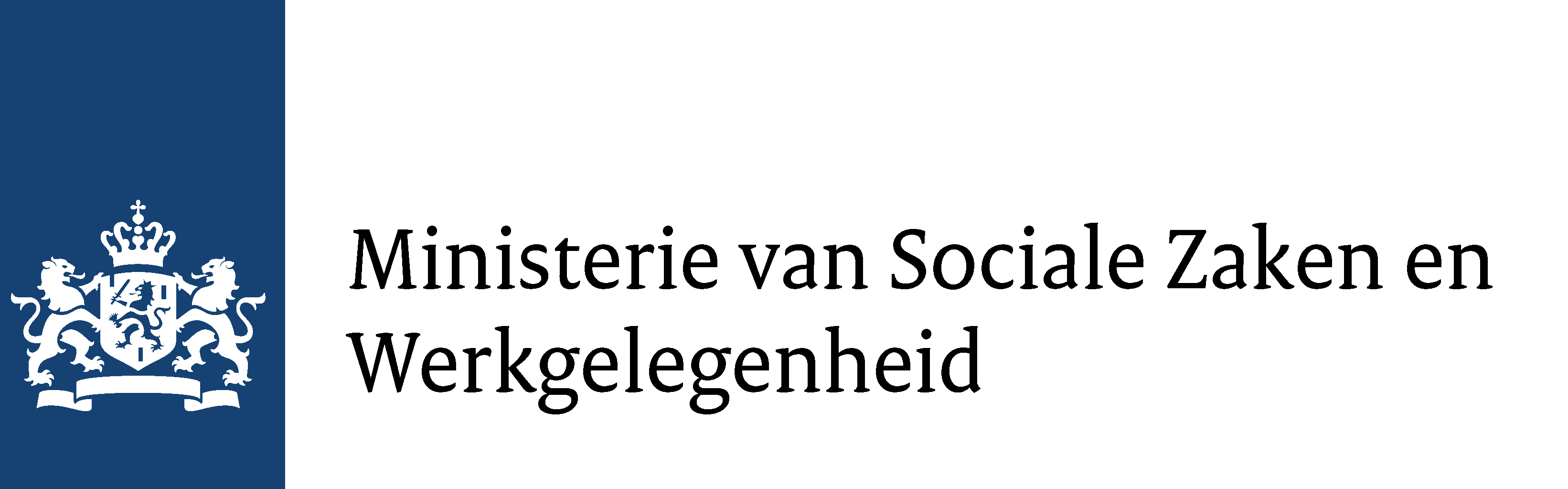
- Ministry of Social Affairs and Employment

- Flag of the Kingdom of the Netherlands

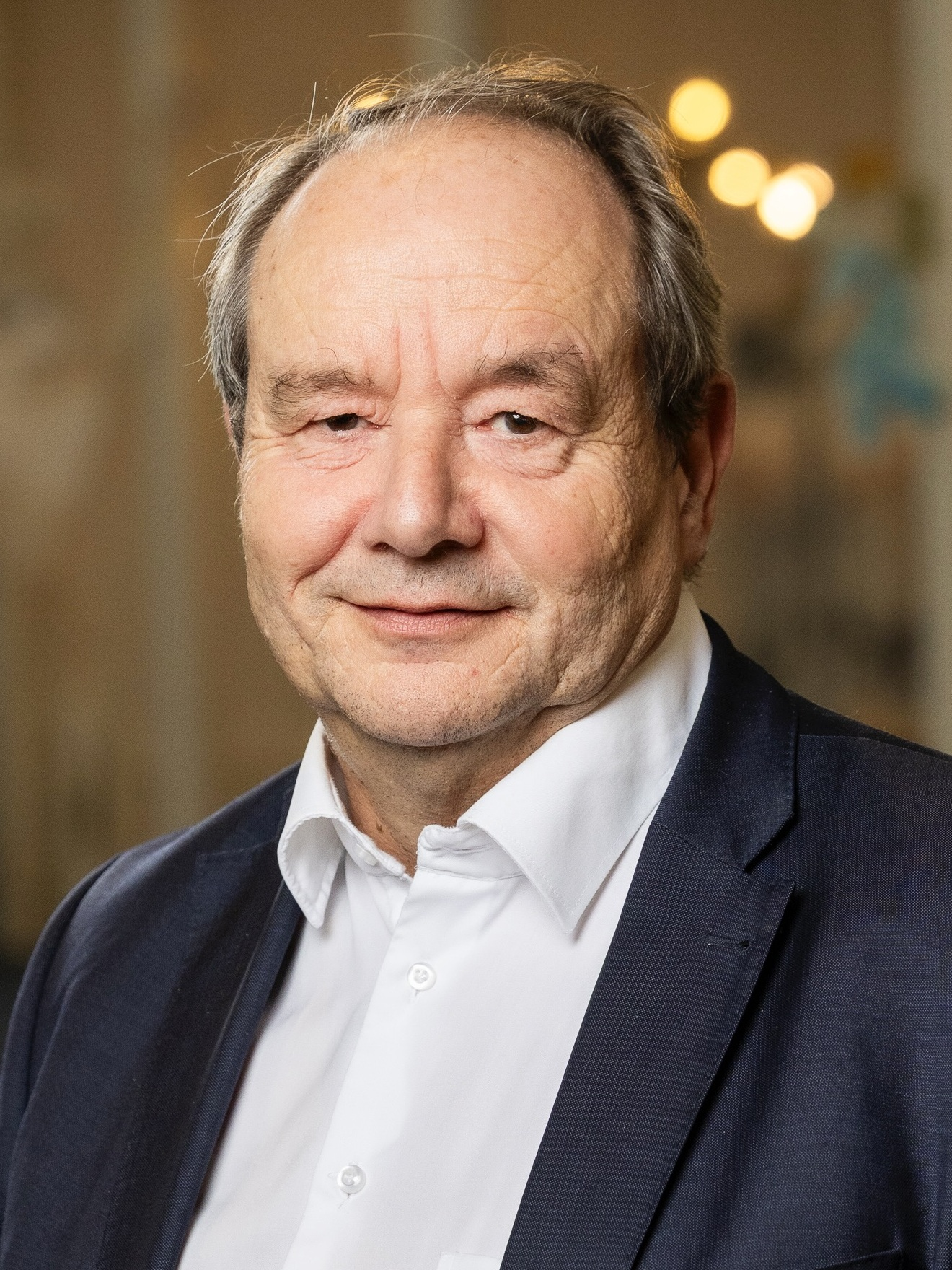
- Incumbent; Hans Vijlbrief since 23 February 2026
- Ministry of Social Affairs and Employment
- Style: His/Her Excellency
- Member of: Council of Ministers
- Appointer: The monarch; on advice of the prime minister
- Formation: 25 September 1918; 108 years ago
- First holder: Piet Aalberse as Minister of Labour
- Deputy: Jurgen Nobel as State Secretary for Participation and Integration
- Salary: €205,991 (As of 2025)

The minister of social affairs and employment (Dutch: Minister van Sociale Zaken en Werkgelegenheid) is the head of the Ministry of Social Affairs and Employment and a member of the Cabinet and the Council of Ministers. The current minister is Mariëlle Paul of the People's Party for Freedom and Democracy (VVD). Regularly, a state secretary is assigned to the ministry who is tasked with specific portfolios. The current state secretary is Jurgen Nobel of the People's Party for Freedom and Democracy (VVD), who has been in office since 2 July 2024 and has been responsible for labor participation and integration. In the past, there have also been ministers without portfolio assigned to the ministry.

== List of ministers of social affairs ==
=== 1918–1945 ===
Minister of Labour		Term of office	Party	Prime Minister (Cabinet)
Piet Aalberse	Piet Aalberse (1871–1948)	25 September 1918 – 1 January 1923	Roman Catholic; State Party	Charles Ruijs de Beerenbrouck (Ruijs de Beerenbrouck I • II)
Minister of Labour, Commerce and Industry		Term of office	Party	Prime Minister (Cabinet)
Piet Aalberse	Piet Aalberse (1871–1948)	1 January 1923 – 4 August 1925	Roman Catholic; State Party	Charles Ruijs de Beerenbrouck (Ruijs de Beerenbrouck II)
Dionysius Koolen	Dion Koolen (1871–1945)	4 August 1925 – 8 March 1926	Roman Catholic; State Party	Hendrikus Colijn (Colijn I)
Jan Rudolph Slotemaker de Bruïne	The Reverend; Jan Rudolph; Slotemaker de Bruïne (1869–1941)	8 March 1926 – 10 August 1929	Christian Historical Union	Dirk Jan de Geer (De Geer I)
Timotheus Verschuur	Timotheus Verschuur (1886–1945)	10 August 1929 – 1 May 1932	Roman Catholic; State Party	Charles Ruijs de Beerenbrouck (Ruijs de Beerenbrouck III)
Minister of Economic Affairs and Labour		Term of office	Party	Prime Minister (Cabinet)
Timotheus Verschuur	Timotheus Verschuur (1886–1945)	1 May 1932 – 8 June 1933	Roman Catholic; State Party	Charles Ruijs de Beerenbrouck (Ruijs de Beerenbrouck III)
Timotheus Verschuur	Timotheus Verschuur (1886–1945)	1 May 1932 – 8 June 1933	Roman Catholic; State Party	Hendrikus Colijn (Colijn II)
Minister of Social Affairs		Term of office	Party	Prime Minister (Cabinet)
Jan Rudolph Slotemaker de Bruïne	The Reverend; Jan Rudolph; Slotemaker de Bruïne (1869–1941)	8 June 1933 – 31 July 1935	Christian Historical Union	Hendrikus Colijn (Colijn II)
Marcus Slingenberg	Marcus Slingenberg (1881–1941)	31 July 1935 – 24 June 1937	Free-thinking; Democratic League	Hendrikus Colijn (Colijn III)
Carl Romme	Carl Romme (1896–1980)	24 June 1937 – 25 July 1939	Roman Catholic; State Party	Hendrikus Colijn (Colijn IV)
Marinus Damme	Marinus Damme (1876–1966)	25 July 1939 – 10 August 1939	Independent; Liberal (Classical Liberal)	Hendrikus Colijn (Colijn V)
Jan van den Tempel	Jan van den Tempel (1877–1955)	10 August 1939 – 23 February 1945	Social Democratic; Workers' Party	Dirk Jan de Geer (De Geer II)
Jan van den Tempel	Jan van den Tempel (1877–1955)	10 August 1939 – 23 February 1945	Social Democratic; Workers' Party	Pieter Sjoerds Gerbrandy (Gerbrandy I • II)
Frans Wijffels	Frans Wijffels (also Ministers of Water Management Feb.Apr.) (1899–1968)	23 February 1945 – 25 June 1945	Roman Catholic; State Party	Pieter Sjoerds Gerbrandy (Gerbrandy III)

=== Since 1945 ===
Minister of Social Affairs		Term of office	Party	Prime Minister (Cabinet)
Willem Drees	Willem Drees (1886–1988)^{[Deputy]}	25 June 1945 – 7 August 1948	Social Democratic; Workers' Party	Willem Schermerhorn (Schermerhorn– Drees)
Willem Drees	Willem Drees (1886–1988)^{[Deputy]}	25 June 1945 – 7 August 1948	Labour Party	Louis Beel (Beel I)
Dolf Joekes	Dolf Joekes (1884–1962)	7 August 1948 – 15 September 1951	Labour Party	Willem Drees (Drees–Van Schaik • Drees I)
Minister of Social Affairs and Health		Term of office	Party	Prime Minister (Cabinet)
Dolf Joekes	Dolf Joekes (1884–1962)	15 September 1951 – 2 September 1952	Labour Party	Willem Drees (Drees I)
Ko Suurhoff	Ko Suurhoff (1905–1967)	2 September 1952 – 22 December 1958	Labour Party	Willem Drees (Drees II • III)
Louis Beel	Louis Beel (Prime Minister) (1902–1985)	22 December 1958 – 19 May 1959	Catholic; People's Party	Louis Beel (Beel II)
Charles van Rooy	Charles van Rooy (1912–1996)	19 May 1959 – 3 July 1961^{[Res]}	Catholic; People's Party	Jan de Quay (De Quay)
Victor Marijnen	Victor Marijnen (1917–1975)	3 July 1961 – 17 July 1961^{[Ad Interim]} ^{[Minister]}	Catholic; People's Party	Jan de Quay (De Quay)
Gerard Veldkamp	Gerard Veldkamp (1921–1990)	17 July 1961 – 5 April 1967	Catholic; People's Party	Jan de Quay (De Quay)
Gerard Veldkamp	Gerard Veldkamp (1921–1990)	17 July 1961 – 5 April 1967	Catholic; People's Party	Victor Marijnen (Marijnen)
Gerard Veldkamp	Gerard Veldkamp (1921–1990)	17 July 1961 – 5 April 1967	Catholic; People's Party	Jo Cals (Cals)
Gerard Veldkamp	Gerard Veldkamp (1921–1990)	17 July 1961 – 5 April 1967	Catholic; People's Party	Jelle Zijlstra (Zijlstra)
Bauke Roolvink	Bauke Roolvink (1912–1979)	5 April 1967 – 6 July 1971	Anti-Revolutionary; Party	Piet de Jong (De Jong)
Minister of Social Affairs		Term of office	Party	Prime Minister (Cabinet)
Jaap Boersma	Jaap Boersma (1929–2012)	6 July 1971 – 19 December 1977	Anti-Revolutionary; Party	Barend Biesheuvel (Biesheuvel I • II)
Jaap Boersma	Jaap Boersma (1929–2012)	6 July 1971 – 19 December 1977	Anti-Revolutionary; Party	Joop den Uyl (Den Uyl)
Wil Albeda	Wil Albeda (1925–2014)	19 December 1977 – 11 September 1981	Anti-Revolutionary; Party	Dries van Agt (Van Agt I)
Wil Albeda	Wil Albeda (1925–2014)	19 December 1977 – 11 September 1981	Christian; Democratic; Appeal	Dries van Agt (Van Agt I)
Minister of Social Affairs and Employment		Term of office	Party	Prime Minister (Cabinet)
Joop den Uyl	Joop den Uyl (1919–1987)^{[Deputy]}	11 September 1981 – 29 May 1982^{[Minister]} ^{[Res]}	Labour Party	Dries van Agt (Van Agt II)
Louw de Graaf	Louw de Graaf (1930–2020)	29 May 1982 – 4 November 1982	Christian; Democratic; Appeal	Dries van Agt (Van Agt III)
Jan de Koning	Jan de Koning (1926–1994)	4 November 1982 – 3 February 1987^{[Minister]} ^{[App]}	Christian; Democratic; Appeal	Ruud Lubbers (Lubbers I)
Jan de Koning	Jan de Koning (1926–1994)	4 November 1982 – 3 February 1987^{[Minister]} ^{[App]}	Christian; Democratic; Appeal	Ruud Lubbers (Lubbers II)
Louw de Graaf	Louw de Graaf (1930–2020)	3 February 1987 – 6 May 1987^{[Acting]}	Christian; Democratic; Appeal	Ruud Lubbers (Lubbers II)
Jan de Koning	Jan de Koning (1926–1994)	6 May 1987 – 7 November 1989^{[Minister]}	Christian; Democratic; Appeal	Ruud Lubbers (Lubbers II)
Bert de Vries	Bert de Vries (born 1938)	7 November 1989 – 22 August 1994	Christian; Democratic; Appeal	Ruud Lubbers (Lubbers III)
Ad Melkert	Ad Melkert (born 1956)	22 August 1994 – 3 August 1998	Labour Party	Wim Kok (Kok I)
Klaas de Vries	Klaas de Vries (born 1943)	3 August 1998 – 24 March 2000^{[App]}	Labour Party	Wim Kok (Kok II)
Willem Vermeend	Willem Vermeend (born 1948)	24 March 2000 – 22 July 2002	Labour Party	Wim Kok (Kok II)
Aart Jan de Geus	Aart Jan de Geus (born 1955)	22 July 2002 – 22 February 2007^{[Minister]}	Christian; Democratic; Appeal	Jan Peter; Balkenende (Balkenende I • II • III)
Piet Hein Donner	Piet Hein Donner (born 1948)	22 February 2007 – 14 October 2010	Christian; Democratic; Appeal	Jan Peter; Balkenende (Balkenende IV)
Henk Kamp	Henk Kamp (born 1952)	14 October 2010 – 5 November 2012	People's Party for Freedom and Democracy	Mark Rutte (Rutte I)
Lodewijk Asscher	Lodewijk Asscher (born 1974)^{[Deputy]}	5 November 2012 – 26 October 2017	Labour Party	Mark Rutte (Rutte II)
Wouter Koolmees	Wouter Koolmees (born 1977)^{[Deputy]}	26 October 2017 – 10 January 2022	Democrats 66	Mark Rutte (Rutte III)
Karien van Gennip	Karien van Gennip (born 1968)^{[Deputy]}	10 January 2022 – 2 July 2024	Christian; Democratic; Appeal	Mark Rutte (Rutte IV)
Eddy van Hijum	Eddy van Hijum (born 1972)	2 July 2024 – 22 August 2025^{[Res]}	New Social; Contract	Dick Schoof (Schoof)
Mona Keijzer	Mona Keijzer (born 1968)^{[Deputy]}	22 August 2025 – 5 September 2025^{[Acting]}	Farmer–Citizen; Movement	Dick Schoof (Schoof)
Mariëlle Paul	Mariëlle Paul (born 1966)	5 September 2025 – Incumbent 23 February 2026	People's Party for Freedom and Democracy	Dick Schoof (Schoof)
Hans Vijlbrief	Hans Vijlbrief (born 1963)	23 February 2026 – Incumbent	Democrats 66	Rob Jetten (Jetten)

^{Resigned}
^{Acting}
^{Ad Interim}
^{Deputy Prime Minister}
^{Acting Deputy Prime Minister from 1 November 2019 until 14 May 2020}
^{Deputy Prime Minister from 5 September 2023}
^{Minister of Agriculture and Fisheries}
^{Minister for Kingdom Relations}
^{Minister of Health, Welfare and Sport from 16 October 2002 until 27 May 2003}
^{Appointed as acting Minister of the Interior}
^{Appointed as Minister of the Interior}

== List of ministers without portfolio ==
Ministers without Portfolio		Portfolio	Term of office	Party	Prime Minister (Cabinet)
Carola Schouten	Carola Schouten (born 1977)^{[Deputy]}	• Welfare • Civic Engagement • Pensions	10 January 2022 – 2 July 2024	Christian Union	Mark Rutte (Rutte IV)

== List of state secretaries for social affairs ==
State Secretary for Social Affairs		Portfolio(s)	Term of office	Party	Prime Minister (Cabinet)
Piet Muntendam	Dr. Piet Muntendam (1901–1986)	• Primary; Healthcare • Elderly Care • Disability Policy	1 April 1950 – 15 September 1951	Labour Party	Willem Drees (Drees–Van Schaik)
Aat van Rhijn	Dr. Aat van Rhijn (1892–1986)	• Social Security • Unemployment • Occupational; Safety • Social Services	15 February 1950 – 15 September 1951	Labour Party	Willem Drees (Drees–Van Schaik)
State Secretary for Social Affairs and Health		Portfolio(s)	Term of office	Party	Prime Minister (Cabinet)
Piet Muntendam	Dr. Piet Muntendam (1901–1986)	• Primary; Healthcare • Elderly Care • Disability Policy	15 September 1951 – 1 October 1953^{[Res]}	Labour Party	Willem Drees (Drees I • II)
Aat van Rhijn	Dr. Aat van Rhijn (1892–1986)	• Social Security • Unemployment • Occupational; Safety • Social Services	15 September 1951 – 22 December 1958	Labour Party	Willem Drees (Drees I • II • III)
Vacant
Bauke Roolvink	Bauke Roolvink (1912–1979)	• Social Security • Unemployment • Occupational; Safety • Social Services	15 June 1959 – 24 July 1963	Anti-Revolutionary; Party	Jan de Quay (De Quay)
Louis Bartels	Dr. Louis Bartels (1915–2002)	• Primary; Healthcare • Elderly Care • Disability Policy • Medical Ethics	3 September 1963 – 5 April 1967	Catholic; People's Party	Victor Marijnen (Marijnen)
Louis Bartels	Dr. Louis Bartels (1915–2002)	• Primary; Healthcare • Elderly Care • Disability Policy • Medical Ethics	3 September 1963 – 5 April 1967	Catholic; People's Party	Jo Cals (Cals)
Louis Bartels	Dr. Louis Bartels (1915–2002)	• Primary; Healthcare • Elderly Care • Disability Policy • Medical Ethics	3 September 1963 – 5 April 1967	Catholic; People's Party	Jelle Zijlstra (Zijlstra)
José de Meijer	Dr. José de Meijer (1915–2000)	• Occupational; Safety • Public; Organisations	15 November 1963 – 5 April 1967	Catholic; People's Party	Victor Marijnen (Marijnen)
José de Meijer	Dr. José de Meijer (1915–2000)	• Occupational; Safety • Public; Organisations	15 November 1963 – 5 April 1967	Catholic; People's Party	Jo Cals (Cals)
José de Meijer	Dr. José de Meijer (1915–2000)	• Occupational; Safety • Public; Organisations	15 November 1963 – 5 April 1967	Catholic; People's Party	Jelle Zijlstra (Zijlstra)
Roelof Kruisinga	Dr. Roelof Kruisinga (1922–2012)	• Primary; Healthcare • Elderly Care • Disability Policy • Medical Ethics	18 April 1967 – 6 July 1971	Christian; Historical Union	Piet de Jong (De Jong)
State Secretary for Social Affairs		Portfolio(s)	Term of office	Party	Prime Minister (Cabinet)
Koos Rietkerk	Koos Rietkerk (1927–1986)	• Social Security • Unemployment • Occupational; Safety	28 July 1971 – 23 April 1973^{[Res]}	People's Party for Freedom and Democracy	Barend Biesheuvel (Biesheuvel I • II)
Jan Mertens	Jan Mertens (1916–2000)	• Social Security • Occupational; Safety	11 May 1973 – 19 December 1977	Catholic; People's Party	Joop den Uyl (Den Uyl)
Louw de Graaf	Louw de Graaf (1930–2020)	• Social Security • Occupational; Safety	28 December 1977 – 11 September 1981	Anti-Revolutionary; Party	Dries van Agt (Van Agt I)
Louw de Graaf	Louw de Graaf (1930–2020)	• Social Security • Occupational; Safety	28 December 1977 – 11 September 1981	Christian; Democratic Appeal	Dries van Agt (Van Agt I)
State Secretary for Social Affairs and Employment		Portfolio(s)	Term of office	Party	Prime Minister (Cabinet)
Ien Dales	Ien Dales (1931–1994)	• Social Security • Unemployment • Elderly Care • Disability Policy	11 September 1981 – 29 May 1982^{[Res]}	Labour Party	Dries van Agt (Van Agt II)
Hedy d'Ancona	Hedy d'Ancona (born 1937)	• Occupational; Safety • Adult; Education • Equality • Emancipation	11 September 1981 – 29 May 1982^{[Res]}	Labour Party	Dries van Agt (Van Agt II)
Piet van Zeil	Piet van Zeil (1927–2012)	• Occupational; Safety • Elderly Care • Disability Policy	12 June 1982 – 4 November 1982^{[State Secretary]}	Christian; Democratic Appeal	Dries van Agt (Van Agt III)
Louw de Graaf	Louw de Graaf (1930–2020)	• Social Security • Unemployment • Occupational; Safety	5 November 1982 – 3 February 1987^{[App]}	Christian; Democratic Appeal	Ruud Lubbers (Lubbers I • II)
Louw de Graaf	Louw de Graaf (1930–2020)	• Social Security • Unemployment • Occupational; Safety	6 May 1987 – 1 October 1989^{[Res]}	Christian; Democratic Appeal	Ruud Lubbers (Lubbers I • II)
Hans Hoogervorst	Annelien Kappeyne van de Coppello (1936–1990)	• Disability Policy • Family Policy • Equality • Emancipation	8 November 1982 – 14 July 1986	People's Party for Freedom and Democracy	Ruud Lubbers (Lubbers I)
Elske ter Veld	Elske ter Veld (1944–2017)	• Social Services • Equality • Emancipation	7 November 1989 – 4 June 1993^{[Res]}	Labour Party	Ruud Lubbers (Lubbers III)
Jacques Wallage	Jacques Wallage (1946–2026)	• Social Services • Equality • Emancipation	9 June 1993 – 22 August 1994	Labour Party	Ruud Lubbers (Lubbers III)
Robin Linschoten	Robin Linschoten (born 1956)	• Social Security • Unemployment • Occupational; Safety	22 August 1994 – 28 June 1998^{[Res]}	People's Party for Freedom and Democracy	Wim Kok (Kok I)
Frank de Grave	Frank de Grave (born 1955)	• Social Security • Unemployment • Occupational; Safety	2 July 1996 – 3 August 1998	People's Party for Freedom and Democracy	Wim Kok (Kok I)
Hans Hoogervorst	Hans Hoogervorst (born 1956)	• Social Security • Occupational; Safety • Social Services	3 August 1998 – 22 July 2002	People's Party for Freedom and Democracy	Wim Kok (Kok II)
	Annelies Verstand (born 1949)	• Unemployment • Equality • Emancipation	3 August 1998 – 22 July 2002	Democrats 66	Wim Kok (Kok II)
Mark Rutte	Mark Rutte (born 1967)	• Social Security • Unemployment • Occupational; Safety • Social Services	22 July 2002 – 17 June 2004^{[App]}	People's Party for Freedom and Democracy	Jan Peter; Balkenende (Balkenende I)
Mark Rutte	Mark Rutte (born 1967)	• Social Security • Unemployment • Occupational; Safety • Social Services	22 July 2002 – 17 June 2004^{[App]}	People's Party for Freedom and Democracy	Jan Peter; Balkenende (Balkenende II)
Henk van Hoof	Henk van Hoof (born 1947)	• Social Security • Unemployment • Occupational; Safety • Social Services	17 June 2004 – 22 February 2007	People's Party for Freedom and Democracy	Jan Peter; Balkenende (Balkenende II)
Henk van Hoof	Henk van Hoof (born 1947)	• Social Security • Unemployment • Occupational; Safety • Social Services	17 June 2004 – 22 February 2007	People's Party for Freedom and Democracy	Jan Peter; Balkenende (Balkenende III)
Philomena Bijlhout	Philomena Bijlhout (born 1957)	• Family Policy • Equality • Emancipation	22 July 2002 – 24 July 2002^{[Res]}	Pim Fortuyn List	Jan Peter; Balkenende (Balkenende I)
	Khee Liang Phoa (born 1955)	• Family Policy • Equality • Emancipation	9 September 2002 – 27 May 2003	Pim Fortuyn List	Jan Peter; Balkenende (Balkenende I)
Ahmed Aboutaleb	Ahmed Aboutaleb (born 1961)	• Social Security • Unemployment • Occupational; Safety • Social Services	22 February 2007 – 18 December 2008^{[App]}	Labour Party	Jan Peter; Balkenende (Balkenende IV)
Jetta Klijnsma	Jetta Klijnsma (born 1957)	• Social Security • Unemployment • Occupational; Safety • Social Services	18 December 2008 – 23 February 2010^{[Res]}	Labour Party	Jan Peter; Balkenende (Balkenende IV)
Paul de Krom	Paul de Krom (born 1963)	• Social Security • Unemployment • Occupational; Safety • Social Services	14 October 2010 – 5 November 2012	People's Party for Freedom and Democracy	Mark Rutte (Rutte I)
Jetta Klijnsma	Jetta Klijnsma (born 1957)	• Social Security • Unemployment • Occupational; Safety • Social Services • Equality • Emancipation	5 November 2012 – 26 October 2017	Labour Party	Mark Rutte (Rutte II)
Tamara van Ark	Tamara van Ark (born 1974)	• Social Security • Unemployment • Occupational; Safety • Social Services • Youth Care • Equality • Emancipation	26 October 2017 – 9 July 2020^{[App]}	People's Party for Freedom and Democracy	Mark Rutte (Rutte III)
Bas van 't Wout	Bas van 't Wout (born 1979)	• Social Security • Unemployment • Occupational; Safety • Social Services • Youth Care • Equality • Emancipation	9 July 2020 – 20 January 2021^{[App]}	People's Party for Freedom and Democracy	Mark Rutte (Rutte III)
Dennis Wiersma	Dennis Wiersma (born 1986)	• Social Security • Unemployment • Occupational; Safety • Social Services • Youth Care • Equality • Emancipation	10 August 2021 – 10 January 2022	People's Party for Freedom and Democracy	Mark Rutte (Rutte III)
	Jurgen Nobel (born 1988)	• Participation • Integration	2 July 2024 – Incumbent	People's Party for Freedom and Democracy	Dick Schoof (Schoof)

^{Resigned}
^{Appointed as State Secretary for Education, Culture and Science}
^{Appointed as Mayor of Rotterdam}
^{Appointed as Minister without Portfolio for Health, Welfare and Sport}
^{Appointed as Minister of Economic Affairs and Climate Policy}
^{State Secretary for Economic Affairs}

== See also ==
- Ministry of Social Affairs and Employment
