= Wil Albeda =

Dutch politician (1925–2014)

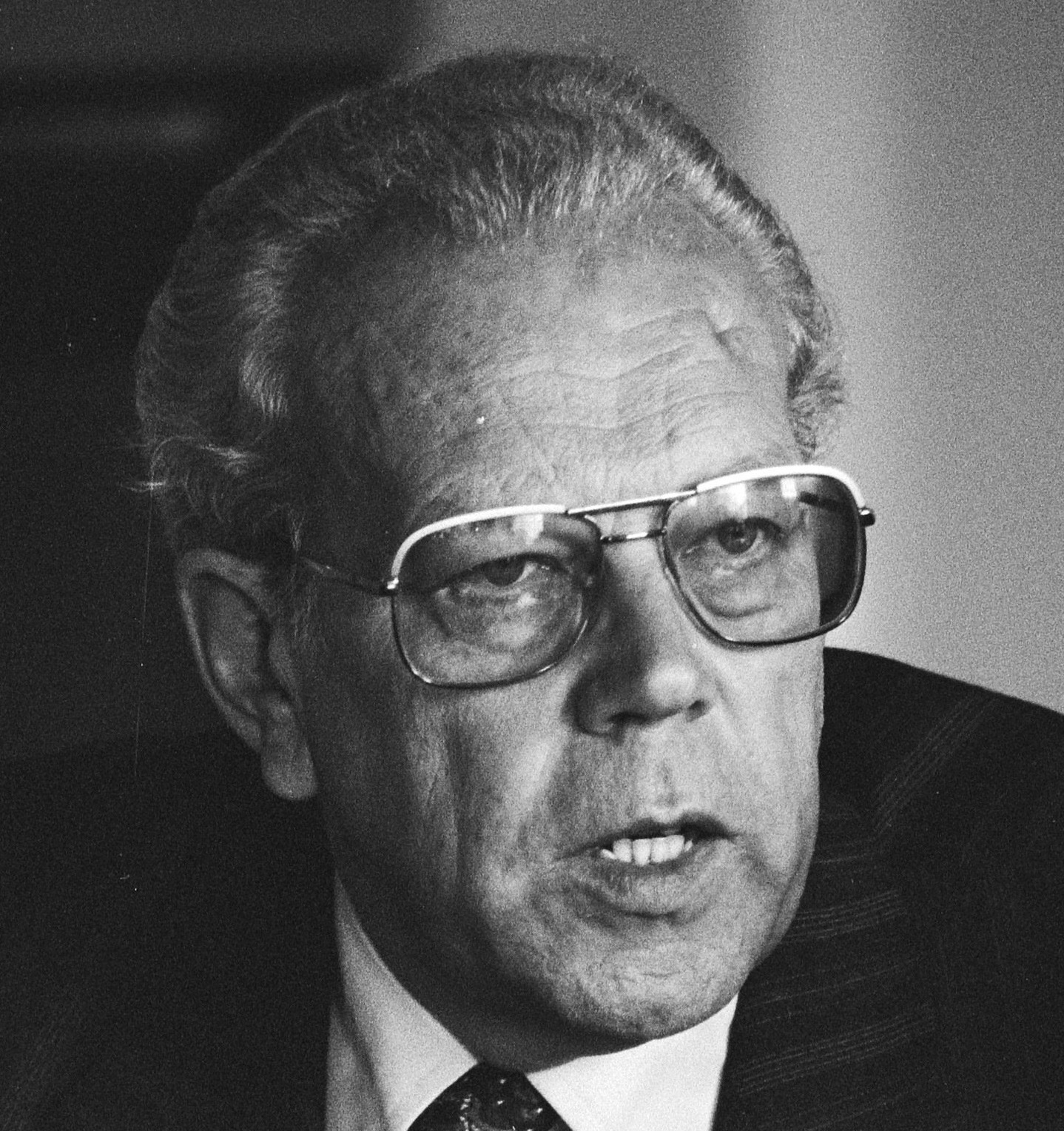
- Albeda in 1977

Chair of the Scientific Council for Government Policy
- In office 1 January 1985 – 1 January 1990
- Preceded by: Kees de Wit
- Succeeded by: Frans Rutten

Minister of Social Affairs
- In office 19 December 1977 – 11 September 1981
- Prime Minister: Dries van Agt
- Preceded by: Jaap Boersma
- Succeeded by: Joop den Uyl as Minister of Social Affairs and Employment

Parliamentary leader in the Senate
- In office 11 May 1973 – 10 June 1977
- Preceded by: Gaius de Gaay Fortman
- Succeeded by: Office discontinued
- Parliamentary group: Anti-Revolutionary Party

Member of the Social and Economic Council
- In office 1 December 1981 – 1 January 1985
- Chairman: Jan de Pous
- In office 1 July 1969 – 19 December 1977
- Chairman: Jan de Pous

Member of the Senate
- In office 30 June 1981 – 13 September 1983
- In office 20 September 1966 – 19 December 1977

Personal details
- Born: Willem Albeda; 13 June 1925 Rotterdam, Netherlands
- Died: 6 May 2014 (aged 88) Maastricht, Netherlands
- Party: Christian Democratic Appeal (from 1980)
- Other political affiliations: Anti-Revolutionary Party (until 1980)
- Education: Rotterdam School of Economics (Bachelor of Economics, Master of Economics); Free University Amsterdam (Doctor of Philosophy)
- Occupation: Politician · Civil servant · Economist · Researcher · Nonprofit director · Trade Union leader · Academic administrator · Author · Professor

Willem Albeda (13 June 1925 – 6 May 2014) was a Dutch politician of the Anti-Revolutionary Party (ARP) and later of the Christian Democratic Appeal (CDA) and economist.

== Biography ==
Albeda attended a gymnasium in Leeuwarden from May 1937 until March 1943. During the German occupation Albeda wanted to continue his study but in March 1943 he refused to sign a loyalty oath to the German occupation authority but to escape prosecution he was forced to enlist in the Arbeitslager in the German armored production industry in Oberhausen. Following the end of World War II Albeda served as a translator for the United States Army from March 1945 until May 1945. Albeda worked as a civil servant for the Fiscal Information and Investigation Service (FIOD) of the Ministry of Finance from May 1945 until June 1945 and for De Nederlandsche Bank from June 1945 until November 1945. Albeda applied at the Rotterdam School of Economics in April 1946 majoring in Economics obtaining a Bachelor of Economics degree in June 1947 before graduating with a Master of Economics degree on 8 December 1950. Albeda worked as a researcher at the Netherlands Economic Institute from April 1948 until September 1951. Albeda worked a financial adviser for the Christian National Trade Union Federation (CNV) from September 1951 until January 1960. Albeda applied at the Vrije Universiteit Amsterdam in July 1952 for a postgraduate education in Development economics and got a doctorate as a Doctor of Philosophy in Development economics on 22 February 1957. Albeda worked as a researcher for Philips from January 1960 until November 1961. Albeda worked as a trade union leader for the National Christian Trade unions and served as General-Secretary from November 1961 until September 1966. Albeda worked as a professor of Development economics at the Rotterdam School of Economics from September 1966 until December 1977 and as a professor of Labour law at the Rotterdam School of Economics from January 1973 until December 1977 and as a professor of Labour law and Public administration at the Delft Institute of Technology from February 1973 until December 1977.

Albeda was elected to the Senate after the 1960 Senate election, taking office on 20 September 1966 serving as a frontbencher chairing the parliamentary committee for General Affairs and parliamentary committee for Economic Affairs and spokesperson for economic affairs, social affairs, development cooperation and development aid. Albeda was selected as parliamentary leader of the Anti-Revolutionary Party in the Senate following the appointment of Gaius de Gaay Fortman as Minister of the Interior in the Den Uyl cabinet, taking office on 11 May 1973. After the 1977 general election Albeda was appointed as Minister of Social Affairs in the Van Agt–Wiegel cabinet, taking office on 19 December 1977. In April 1981 Albeda announced that he would not stand for the 1981 general election but wanted tot return to the Senate. After the 1981 Senate election Albeda returned to the Senate, taking office on 30 June 1981. Following the 1981 cabinet formation Boersma was not giving a cabinet post in the new cabinet; the Van Agt-Wiegel cabinet was replaced by the Van Agt II cabinet on 11 September 1981 and he continued to serve in the Senate as a frontbencher and spokesperson for economic affairs and social affairs and deputy spokesperson for finance.

Albeda became a distinguished professor of Economics at Utrecht University, serving from 1 November 1981 until 1 January 1985 and also returned to the Social and Economic Council, serving from 1 December 1981 until 1 January 1985. In December 1984 Albeda was nominated as director of the Scientific Council for Government Policy, serving from 1 January 1985 until 1 January 1990.

== Decorations ==
Honours
Ribbon bar	Honour	Country	Date	Comment
	Grand Officer of the Order of Leopold II	Belgium	30 March 1979	
	Knight of the Order of the Netherlands Lion	Netherlands	26 October 1981	
	Knight Commander of the Order of Merit	Germany	21 March 1986	
	Grand Officer of the Order of Orange-Nassau	Netherlands	1 January 1990	Elevated from Officer (30 April 1976)

Party political offices
Preceded by Gaius de Gaay Fortman	Parliamentary leader of the Anti-Revolutionary Party in the Senate; 1973–1977	Party merged into the Christian Democratic Appeal
Political offices
Preceded by Jaap Boersma	Minister of Social Affairs; 1977–1981	Succeeded by Joop den Uyl as Minister of Social Affairs and Employment
Civic offices
Preceded by Kees de Wit	Director of the Scientific Council for Government Policy; 1985–1990	Succeeded by Frans Rutten
