= Ministry of Social Affairs and Employment =

Government ministry of the Netherlands

- Ministerie van Sociale Zaken en Werkgelegenheid
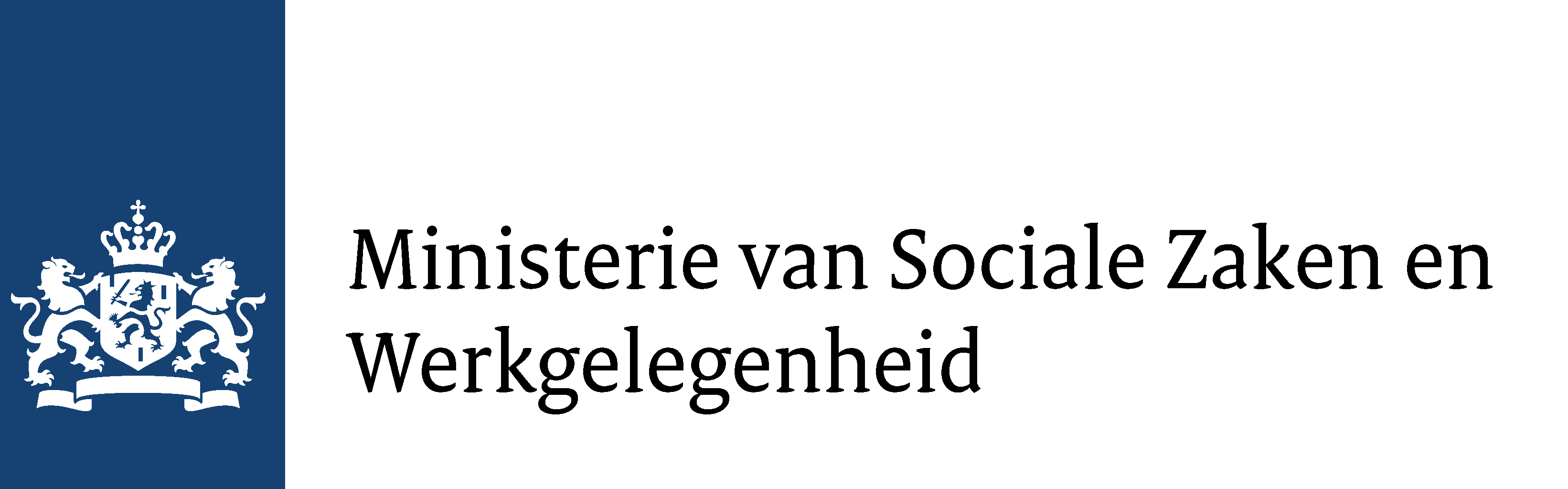
- Ministry logo

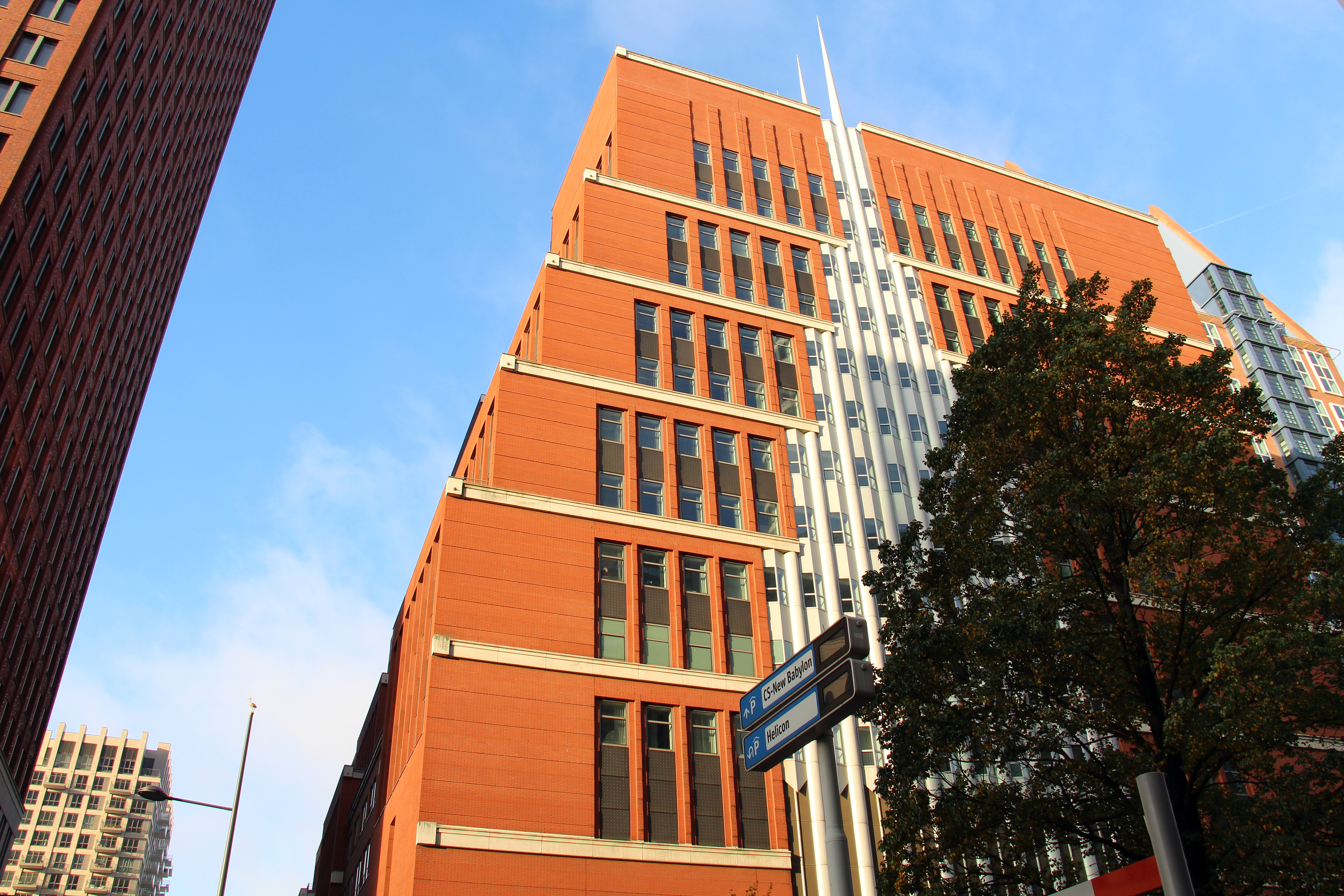
- Ministry of Social Affairs and Employment

Department overview
- Formed: 25 September 1918; 107 years ago
- Jurisdiction: Kingdom of the Netherlands
- Headquarters: Anna van Hannoverstraat 4, The Hague, Netherlands
- Annual budget: €81.8 billion (2018)
- Minister responsible: Mariëlle Paul, Minister of Social Affairs and Employment
- Deputy Minister responsible: Jurgen Nobel, State Secretary for Participation and Integration
- Website: Ministry of Social Affairs and Employment

The Ministry of Social Affairs and Employment (Dutch: Ministerie van Sociale Zaken en Werkgelegenheid; SZW) is the Dutch ministry responsible for social affairs, relations between employers and employees, social security, trade unions and emancipation. It was established in 1918 as the Ministry of Labour and had several name changes before it became the Ministry of Social Affairs and Employment in 1981. The ministry is headed by the Minister of Social Affairs and Employment, currently Mariëlle Paul of People's Party for Freedom and Democracy.

== Responsibilities ==
The ministry is responsible for five fields of policy:

- Employment and the labour market
- Social security
- Income-policy
- Relations between employers and employees
- Occupational safety and health

== Organisation ==
The ministry is currently headed by one minister and one state secretary. The ministry's main office is located in The Hague. The civil service is headed by a secretary general (currently Loes Mulder) and a vice-secretary general, who head a system of three general directorates:

- Relations between employers and employees and international affairs
- Occupational safety and Health and social insurances
- Labour market policy and social welfare

Furthermore, there is an inspector general responsible for the inspection of employment and income, who supervises the local centres for employment and income.

== Mobility centres ==
Beginning in 2006, the Ministry established a network of mobility centres whose function is to coordinate the multiple companies of any given industry to facilitate the movement of employees between companies. This is seen as an alternative to forced lay-offs.

== History ==
The ministry was founded in 1933, at the height of the Great Depression. Before that the limited social policy had been the responsibility of the ministry of Economic Affairs. After the Second World War the ministry became much more important, as the Netherlands transformed into a welfare state.

In 1982 the responsibility for labour market policy was transferred to the ministry from the ministry of Economic Affairs in order to enlarge the portfolio of Deputy Prime Minister Joop den Uyl. Emancipation also became a responsibility of the ministry.
