= Max Rood =

Dutch politician and jurist

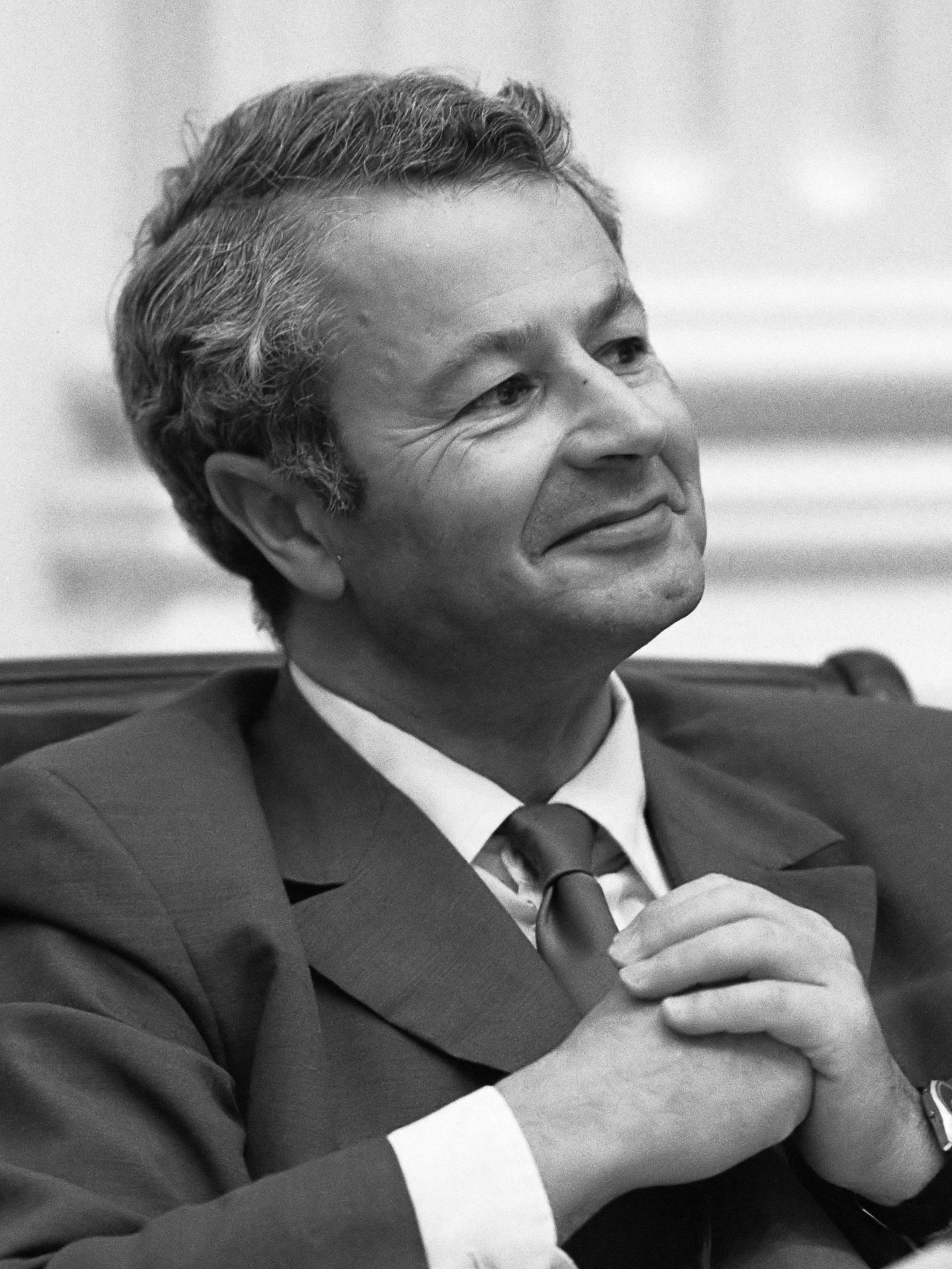
Max Rood (1982)

Max Gustaaf Rood (21 August 1927 in Enschede – 2 December 2001 in Amsterdam) was a Dutch jurist and politician of Democrats 66 (D66).

Rood was a legal scholar on the subject of labour law at Leiden University. He was Minister of the Interior in the Third Van Agt cabinet in 1982.
