= Joop den Uyl =

Prime Minister of the Netherlands from 1973 to 1977

His Excellency Joop den Uyl
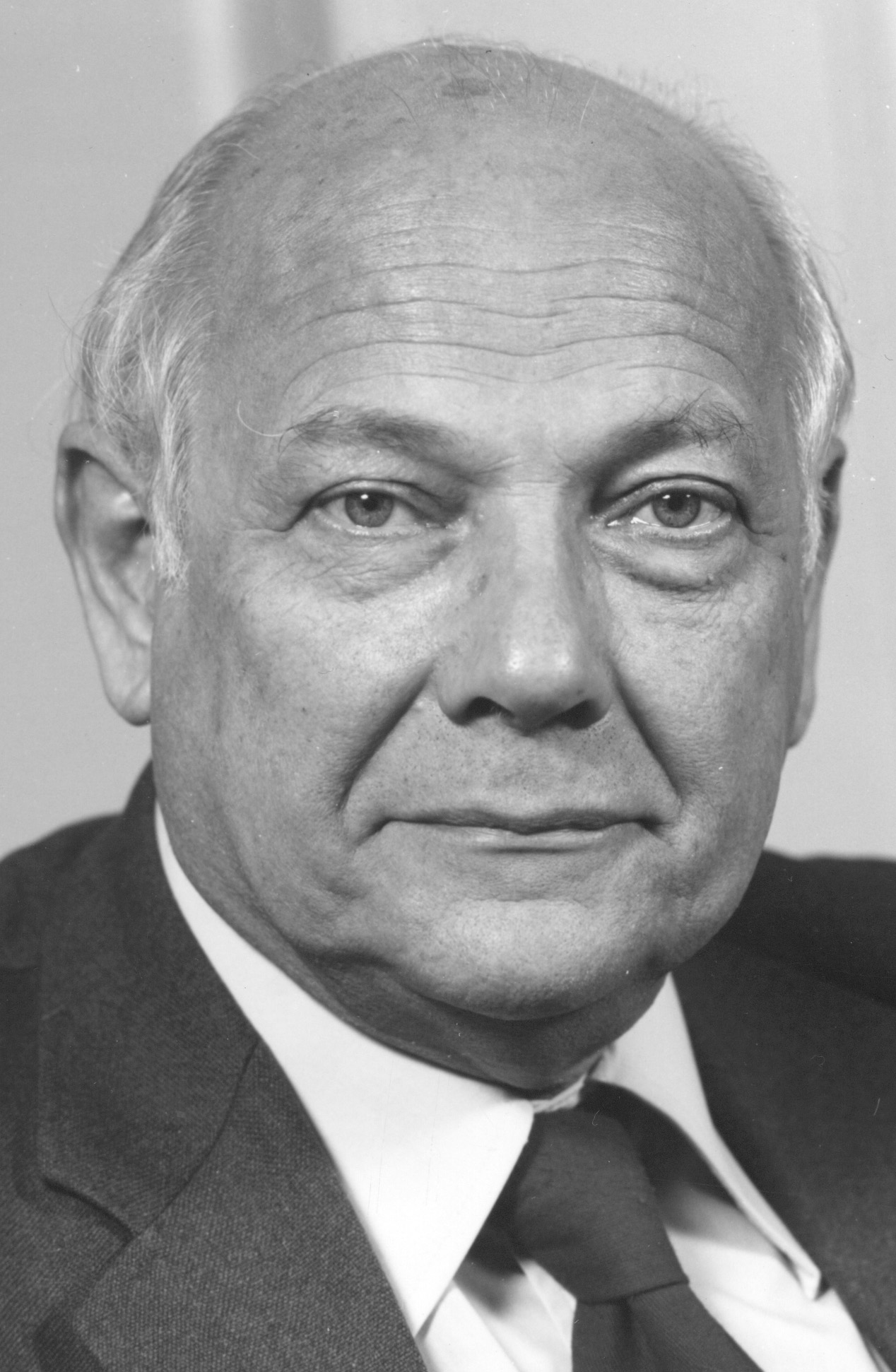
- Den Uyl in 1975

Prime Minister of the Netherlands
- In office 11 May 1973 – 19 December 1977
- Monarch: Juliana
- Deputy: See list: Dries van Agt (1973–1977) Gaius de Gaay Fortman (1977)
- Preceded by: Barend Biesheuvel
- Succeeded by: Dries van Agt

Deputy Prime Minister of the Netherlands
- In office 11 September 1981 – 29 May 1982 Serving with Jan Terlouw
- Prime Minister: Dries van Agt
- Preceded by: Hans Wiegel
- Succeeded by: Jan Terlouw

Minister of Social Affairs and Employment
- In office 11 September 1981 – 29 May 1982
- Prime Minister: Dries van Agt
- Preceded by: Wil Albeda as Minister of Social Affairs
- Succeeded by: Louw de Graaf

Minister for Netherlands Antilles Affairs
- In office 11 September 1981 – 29 May 1982
- Prime Minister: Dries van Agt
- Preceded by: Fons van der Stee
- Succeeded by: Jan de Koning

President of the Party of European Socialists
- In office 8 March 1980 – 19 May 1987
- Preceded by: Robert Pontillon
- Succeeded by: Vítor Constâncio

Leader of the Labour Party in the House of Representatives
- In office 16 September 1982 – 21 July 1986
- Preceded by: Wim Meijer
- Succeeded by: Wim Kok
- In office 16 January 1978 – 11 September 1981
- Preceded by: Ed van Thijn
- Succeeded by: Wim Meijer
- In office 8 June 1977 – 8 September 1977
- Preceded by: Ed van Thijn
- Succeeded by: Ed van Thijn
- In office 23 February 1967 – 11 May 1973
- Preceded by: Gerard Nederhorst
- Succeeded by: Ed van Thijn

Leader of the Labour Party
- In office 13 September 1966 – 21 July 1986
- Preceded by: Anne Vondeling
- Succeeded by: Wim Kok

Minister of Economic Affairs
- In office 14 April 1965 – 22 November 1966
- Prime Minister: Jo Cals
- Preceded by: Koos Andriessen
- Succeeded by: Joop Bakker

Member of the House of Representatives
- In office 16 September 1982 – 24 December 1987
- In office 16 January 1978 – 11 September 1981
- In office 8 June 1977 – 8 September 1977
- In office 23 February 1967 – 11 May 1973
- In office 6 November 1956 – 5 June 1963

Personal details
- Born: Johannes Marten den Uijl; 9 August 1919 Hilversum, Netherlands
- Died: 24 December 1987 (aged 68) Amsterdam, Netherlands
- Party: Labour Party (from 1946)
- Other political affiliations: Anti-Revolutionary Party (1937–1946)
- Spouse: Liesbeth van Vessem (m. 1944)
- Children: 7, including Saskia Noorman-den Uyl
- Education: University of Amsterdam (BEc, M.Econ)
- Occupation: Politician · civil servant · economist · journalist · editor · author · activist
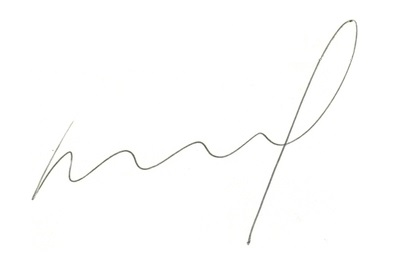
- Signature

Johannes Marten den Uijl (9 August 1919 – 24 December 1987), better known as Joop den Uyl (Dutch: [ˈjoːb dɛn ˈœyl]), (Note: Joop in isolation: [joːp].) was a Dutch politician and economist who served as Prime Minister of the Netherlands from 1973 to 1977. He was a member of the Labour Party (PvdA). Den Uyl studied economics at the University of Amsterdam obtaining a Master of Economics degree and worked as a civil servant at the Ministry of Economic Affairs from February 1942 until May 1945 and as a journalist and editor for Het Parool and Vrij Nederland from May 1945 until January 1949. Den Uyl served as director of the Wiardi Beckman Foundation from January 1949 until June 1963. Den Uyl became a member of the House of Representatives shortly after the number of seats was raised from 100 to 150 seats following the election of 1956 serving from 6 November 1956 until 5 June 1963 as a frontbencher and spokesperson for economics. Den Uyl was appointed as Minister of Economic Affairs in the Cals cabinet, taking office on 14 April 1965. After Labour Leader Anne Vondeling unexpectedly announced he was stepping down, Den Uyl announced his candidacy and was selected as his successor as Leader on 13 September 1966. Under his leadership, the PvdA became a big tent party that undermined support for the small left parties, including the Radicals and the Communists.

In the election of 1967, Den Uyl served as lead candidate and became Parliamentary leader, taking office on 23 February 1967. In the election of 1972 Den Uyl again served as lead candidate and after a long cabinet formation formed the Den Uyl cabinet and became Prime Minister of the Netherlands, taking office on 11 May 1973. The cabinet collapsed on 22 March 1977 following years of tensions in the ruling coalition. During the election of 1977 Den Uyl served as lead candidate but following a difficult cabinet formation failed to create a new coalition. Den Uyl left office following the installation of the Van Agt I cabinet on 19 December 1977 but continued to serve in the House of Representatives as Parliamentary leader. For the election of 1981 Den Uyl again served as lead candidate and following a cabinet formation with his successor— the leader of the Christian Democratic Appeal, Dries van Agt— formed the Van Agt II cabinet with Den Uyl appointed as Deputy Prime Minister and Minister of Social Affairs and Employment, taking office on 11 September 1981.

The cabinet fell just seven months into its term and was replaced with the caretaker Van Agt III cabinet, with Den Uyl resigning on 29 May 1982. For the election of 1982 Den Uyl again served as lead candidate and returned to the House of Representatives as Parliamentary leader, taking office on 16 September 1982. For the election of 1986 Den Uyl once again served as lead candidate but shortly thereafter announced he was stepping down as Leader on 21 July 1986 and endorsed former trade union leader Wim Kok as his successor though continued to serve in the House of Representatives as a backbencher. In October 1987 Den Uyl was diagnosed with a terminal brain tumor and died just three months later at the age of 68.

Den Uyl was known for his abilities as a skilful debater and as an idealistic and determined leader. During his premiership, his cabinet was responsible for major social reforms and dealing with several major crises such as the 1973 oil crisis, the Lockheed bribery scandals, Moluccans incidents and the fallout of the Yom Kippur War. He holds the distinction as leading the most left-wing Dutch cabinet, and his premiership is seen as divisive with both scholars and the public, from considering him to have been average to him having been one of the best Prime Ministers since World War II. Den Uyl also served as vice-president of the Socialist International, and advocated international disarmament efforts.

== Early life ==
United States Secretary of State Henry Kissinger and Prime Minister Joop den Uyl at the Catshuis on 11 August 1976.

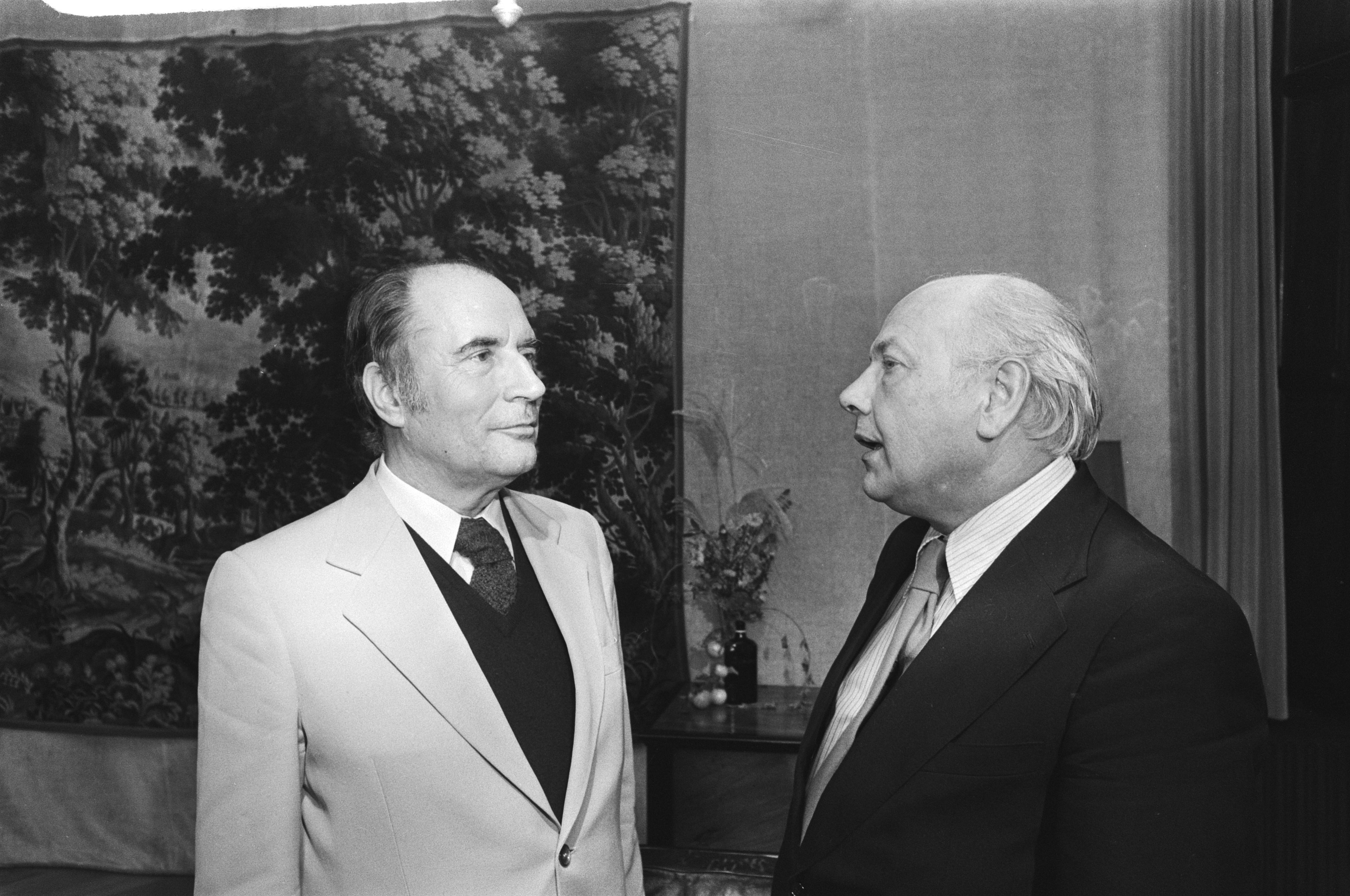
French Socialist Leader François Mitterrand and Prime Minister Joop den Uyl and at the Catshuis on 28 September 1976.

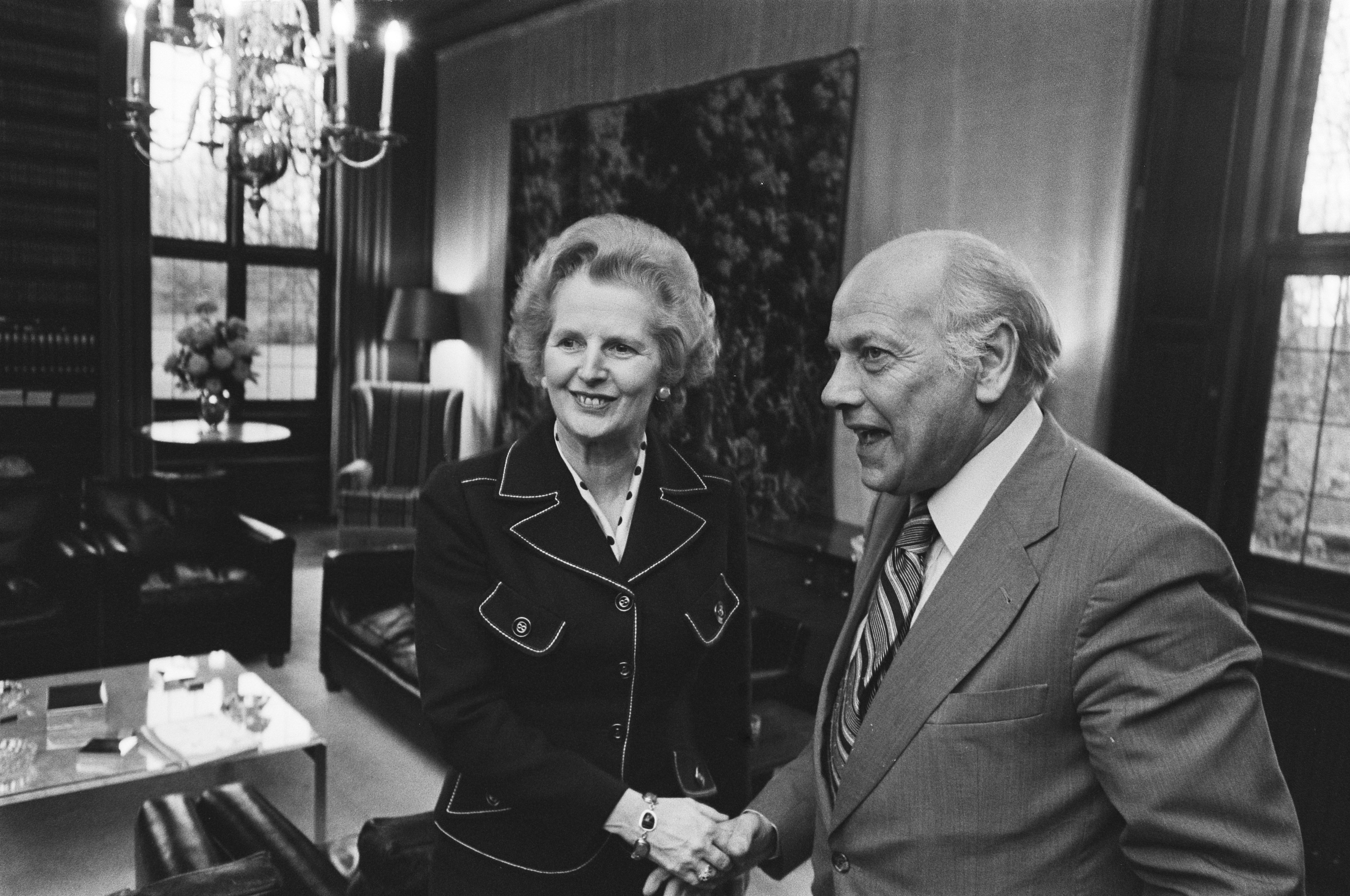
British Leader of the Opposition Margaret Thatcher and Prime Minister Joop den Uyl at the Catshuis on 6 December 1976.

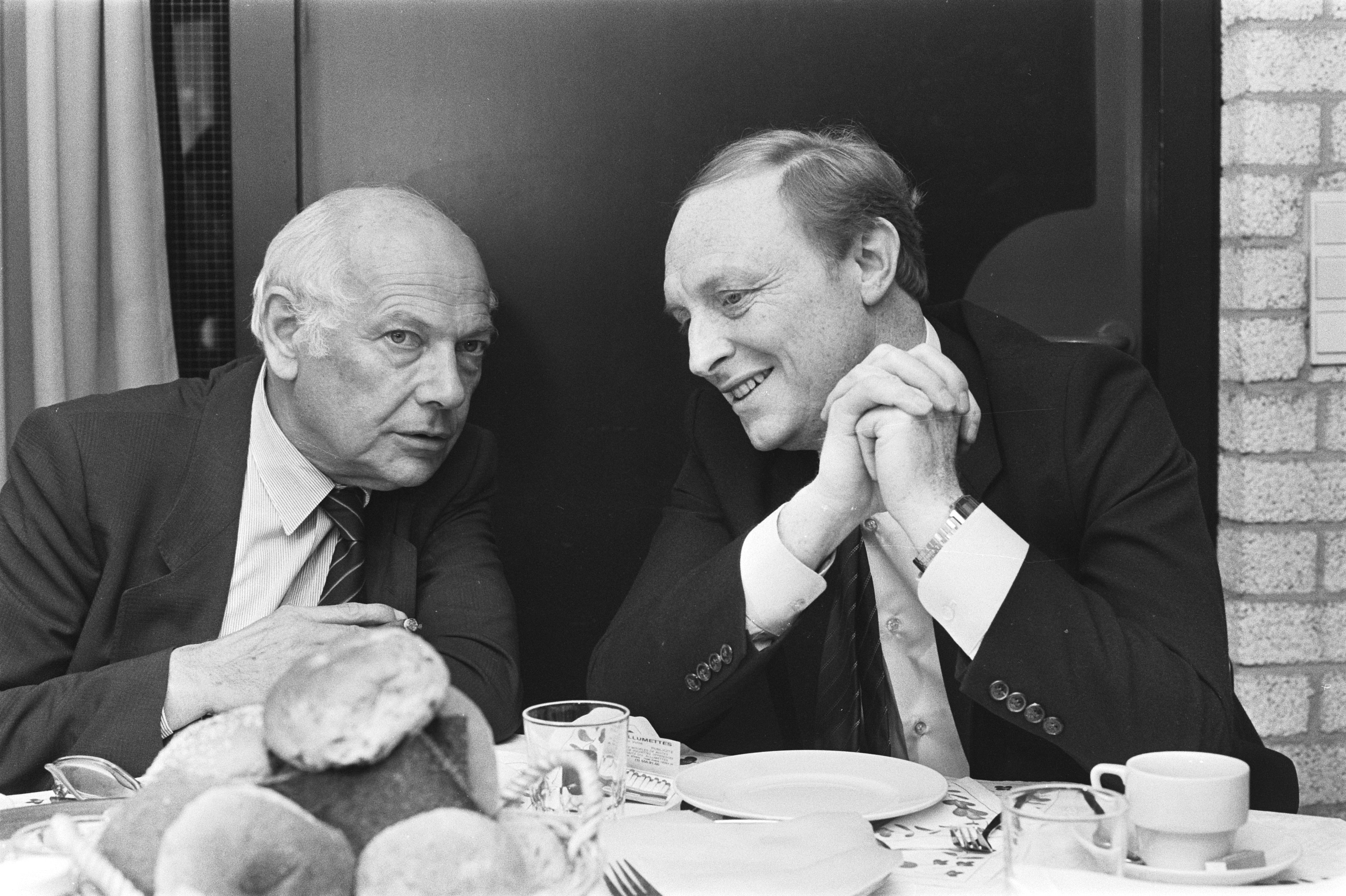
Labour Leader Joop den Uyl and British Leader of the Opposition Neil Kinnock in Rotterdam on 26 May 1984.

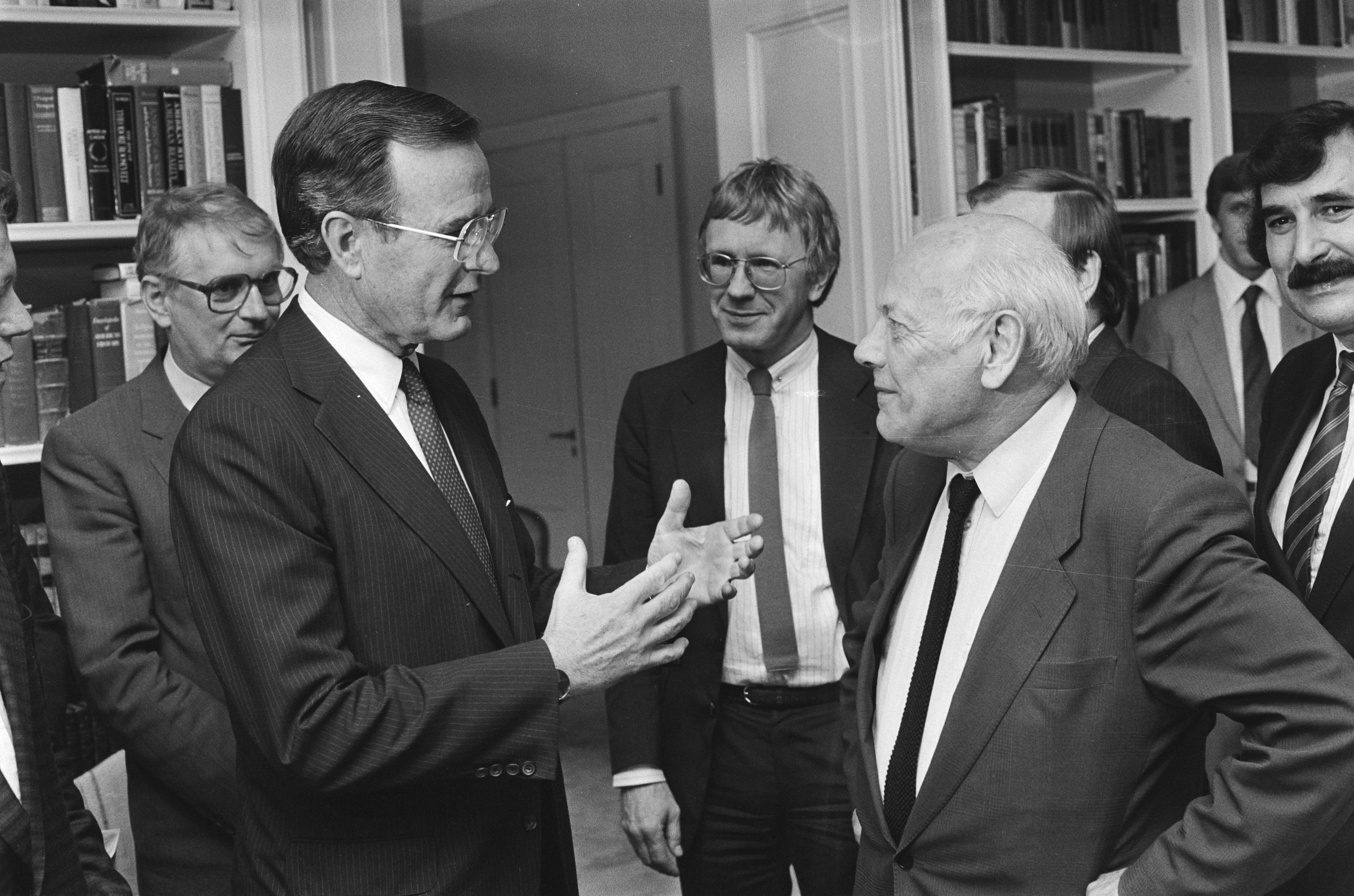
Vice President of the United States George H. W. Bush and Labour Leader Joop den Uyl in The Hague on 26 June 1985.

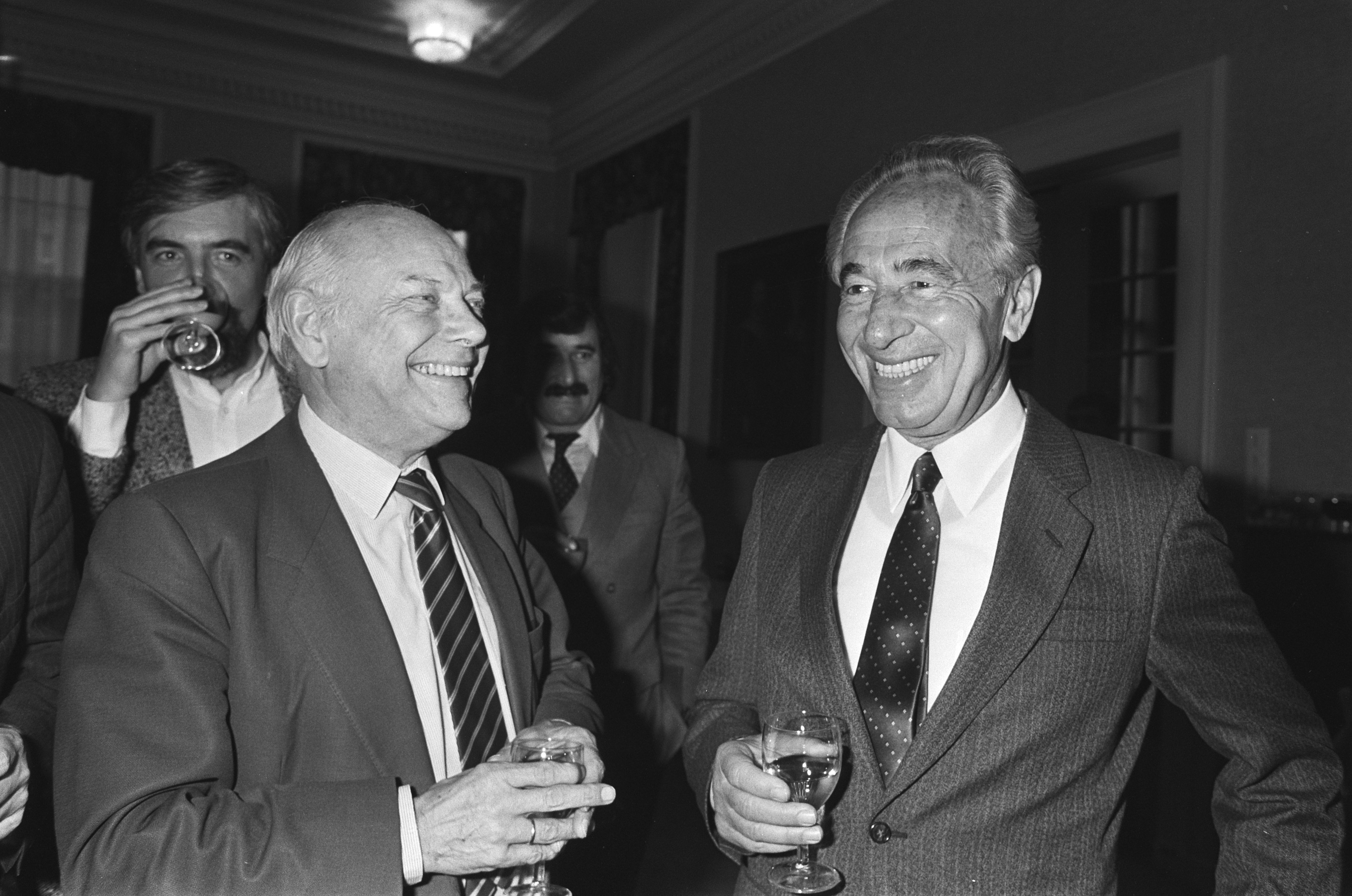
Labour Leader Joop den Uyl and Prime Minister of Israel Shimon Peres in The Hague on 21 January 1986.

Johannes Marten den Uijl was born on 9 August 1919 in the town of Hilversum. He was born in a Calvinist Reformed family. His father, Johannes den Uyl, was a shopkeeper and a basket weaver who died when Den Uyl was 10. Den Uyl attended the Christian Lyceum, the modern-day Comenius College, in Hilversum from 1931 to 1936. Following this he studied economics at the University of Amsterdam. During this period in his life he left the church. In 1942 he attained the doctorandus degree. Until 1945 he was a civil servant at the National Bureau for Prices of Chemical Products, part of the Ministry of Economic Affairs. During that period he was part of the underground newspaper group that published the clandestine Het Parool. After World War II, Den Uyl worked for Het Parool, Vrij Nederland and other former resistance papers. From January 1949 to 1963 he was the head of the Wiardi Beckman Stichting, the think tank of the social democratic Labour Party. In 1953, at the invitation of the American government, Den Uyl stayed in the United States for a few months, gaining an appreciation of the American experience.

== Political career ==
In 1953 Den Uyl was elected to the municipal council of Amsterdam and in 1956 he was elected to the House of Representatives. In 1963, he became municipal administrator for economic affairs in Amsterdam, resigning his parliamentary seat. He resigned that post in 1965 to become Minister of Economic Affairs in the Cals cabinet. As the responsible minister, he decided to close the uneconomic coal mines in Limburg, causing high local unemployment. Following the parliamentary elections of 1967, he became leader of the Labour Party in parliament.

Den Uyl's Labour Party won the 1972 election in alliance with the progressive liberal Democrats 66 and radical Christian Political Party of Radicals, but failed to achieve a majority in parliament. After lengthy negotiations, he formed Den Uyl cabinet with the Christian democratic Catholic People's Party and Anti-Revolutionary Party. This cabinet faced many problems. An early problem was the 1973 oil boycott following the Dutch support of Israel in the Yom Kippur War. Den Uyl said in a speech on national television that "things would never return to the way they were" and implemented fuel rationing and a ban on Sunday driving.

Between 1973 and 1977, the country's economic situation turned ugly. The government's budget deficit increased tenfold, inflation approached 10 percent, the unemployment rate doubled, and the current account went from positive to negative – the latter a critical problem in a country that rises or falls on foreign trade. Despite economic difficulties, however, the government pursued a redistributive agenda while real incomes grew from 1973 to 1977. According to a 1978 budget memorandum, the real disposable income of the "modal worker" (a statistical concept, as noted by one study, 'similar to the OECD's "average production worker" but at a somewhat lower level of earnings') went up by 10.3%, for minimum wage earners by 17.8%, and retired people by 27.3%. The military budget was also reduced and international aid was increased, while expansionary fiscal policies were implemented. The government also enacted a wide range of progressive social reforms, such as significant increases in welfare payments, the indexation of benefits and the minimum wage to contractual private sector wage developments and a system of rent rebates (1975).

Kindergartens and primary schools with high percentages of children from lower income families were provided with extra facilities (including more money and teachers) and cooperation was stimulated between schools and social and cultural institutions. In addition, 3 local compensatory education and family involvement projects that had been initiated in the early Seventies in Utrecht, Rotterdam and Amsterdam were subsidized by the Ministry of Education under the terms of a new educational development policy.

In August 1975, nursery school fees were abolished. The Primary Education Act of October 1974 gave more freedom to school heads regarding the programming of the curriculum, and an Act of June 1974 made supplementary benefits available to unemployed persons who accepted lower paid- work, with those over 45 receiving supplements "amounting to 100% of their former wage during the first six months; 95% in the next six months, and 85% during the second, third and fourth year; those under 45 receive supplements amounting to 90% during six months, 85% during the next two years." In addition, a law of June 1976 enabled employees aged sixty, two years after the first date of receipt of benefits (WWV scheme), to continue receiving them until the age of sixty-five. The purpose of this legislation was to improve the financial circumstances of older employees who are unemployed for a long time. In August 1976, job protection was introduced during pregnancy and for 12 weeks following childbirth. The number of years of full compulsory education were increased, and an Act on equal pay in the private sector was introduced. Investments were also carried out in social services, such as home care services for families.

In 1975, a rent readjustment grant was adopted "to assist households that were capable and desirous of living in better accommodations, but who were intimidated by the sudden increase in rent and the burden of moving costs." Various types of tenants were eligible, such as those leaving a slum dwelling for a higher rent unit. From 1 January 1975, the elderly "who rely solely or almost exclusively on the AOW pension have been granted an additional reduction of NLG 18 per month on the premium for health insurance for the elderly." Also, with retroactive effect from 1 July 1975, "a new regulation for relocation and refurbishment costs applies to elderly people who want to move from a cheaper to a more expensive home." In 1975 the social assistance standard was again structurally increased for incomplete families. In 1974 and 1975, the social assistance standards structurally increased more than the net minimum wage. In 1975, national legislation was introduced for residential homes (previously, homes for the elderly had been a responsibility of local authorities).

Taking into account the fact that the dilapidation of private (rental) homes can seriously impede the efficient implementation of urban renewal plans, a regulation was drawn up at the end of 1976 in connection with this "that provides for the granting of financial support to municipalities and approved institutions when they purchase homes from private individuals with the aim of providing the residents of such homes with a reasonable level of living enjoyment for a considerable period of time after a major improvement. For larger municipalities in particular, this aid measure can be an incentive to purchase homes from private owners." From 1976 onwards, "schemes have been in place under which grants have been provided for the adaptation of accommodation for the disabled." In 1976, a separate subsidy scheme was introduced for young single persons. In 1976, a law provided a cash benefit equal to the old-age benefit for disabled heads of families (including the unemployed and self-employed) and disabled single persons aged 17 and over, including those disabled since childhood. Previously, only employed persons for eligible for these benefits. The same law provided for rehabilitation benefits for homemakers. This law also provided for special transport, retraining and reimbursement of extra expenditures incurred as a result of handicaps "on the condition that these services are not provided by other social security legislation."

A regulation was introduced in September 1973 providing for the employment of persons "for whom it is difficult to find employment and who have been in prolonged unemployment." In 1974 the AOW was linked to the minimum wage and therefore became welfare-fixed. After the ABW was linked to the minimum wage in 1974 lone parents were allowed to keep about a third of their earnings in addition to the benefit, up to a maximum of 25% of the minimum wage. In January that year, a statutory minimum wage for young people between the ages of 15 and 22 was introduced, and in March 1974 the insurance scheme for wage and salary earners was extended to cover the costs of physiotherapy treatment "where this has been prescribed by a doctor." Under a decree of 19 July 1974 unemployed civil servants and their survivors were entitled to certain benefits. The National Standardization Decree of 3 July 1974 provided rules for the provision of assistance for generally necessary subsistence costs. According to one report "In 1974 the National Assistance Decree came into effect. A social minimum now applied to various types of households: a standard amount that was considered sufficient to cover the general necessary costs of existence."

The decree established general rules for the determination of the social assistance level. Net benefits according to the ABW (Public Assistance Act) were fixed at 100% of the net minimum wage for a married worker aged 23 and elder, and the minimum benefits for breadwinners in the social insurance schemes were finally equalized to minimal wage in 1975. As noted by one study, "The fixed minimum wage could best serve as a guideline for this. That goal was definitively achieved in 1974: social assistance benefits, the AOW, the widow's benefit and the basic benefits of the Sickness Benefits Act, WAO, WW, WWV all amount to one hundred percent of the net minimum wage, around a thousand guilders per year." Also, as noted by another study, "Partly under the influence of the increase in unemployment since the oil crisis of 1973, a hardship clause was added to the Social Security Act in July 1974 through a change in the National Standards Decree. As a result, you can claim benefits without your entire baptismal certificate being examined by social work. From 1975, everyone from the age of sixteen without a fixed income is entitled to a social assistance benefit." A modest amount of money was released for self-employed persons as an old-age provision through the National Group Regulation on the release of old-age provision for special groups. As noted by one study, the National Group Scheme for the release of old-age provision for special groups "envisaged exemption from (part of) the assets of a former self-employed person in the means test for social assistance." In September 1975, a regulation on the promotion of vocational training for young people was introduced. The chances of obtaining an individual rent subsidy were also significantly increased. Early retirement measures were also implemented, with the Den Uyl government being the first administration to do this.

The Collective Redundancy (Notification) Act of 1976 imposed an obligation on employers (who intend to collectively dismiss employees) "to give written notice of this intention to the relevant trade unions for consultation," while that same year consultative works councils were replaced by powerful ones modelled after the German works councils. Also in 1976, a law was passed forbidding dismissal upon pregnancy or marriage for all women. In 1976, a Criminal Injuries Compensation fund was set up. Extra money was also spent on urban renewal, while the arrangement "that allows tenants to get used to a higher rent for a renovated home has been improved." Various measures were undertaken in the field of road safety, such as compulsory moped helmets and seat belts and the establishment of an alcohol test (breath test). Subsidies were also granted to experiments with Bureaus for Legal Aid. An Act of 26 June 1975 extended (as noted by one study) "the right to compensation for wrongful temporary detention." New health and safety regulations were also introduced, such as an order of 12 January 1976 that made it illegal (as noted by one study) "to have available, use, process, pack, or transport propane sultone in connexion with work."An order of 19 June 1976 amended the Agricultural Safety Order by requiring tractors (as noted by one study) "to be fitted with a suitable cabin, frame or bar in such a way that the driver is adequately protected should be tractor tip over backwards or overturn in some other way." In addition, the Order included a paragraph "concerning the elimination or restriction of harmful or objectionable noise and vibration produced by agricultural machinery, tractors and other equipment." A law of December 1976 relaxed the conditions for exemption from national insurance contributions or entitlement to pay reduced contributions, and also extended entitlement to orphans' pensions. In May 1977, a subsidy scheme for the placing of handicapped persons was introduced.

In 1977, the Den Uyl cabinet fell as a result of a dispute between leftists and the more centrist KVP. This was over the amount of money that owners of land that had been expropriated for government projects should receive from municipal councils, with leftists around den Uyl arguing that centrists (as noted by one observer) "wanted to give too much protection to landowners" while centrists "accused the leftists of seeking to hand over excessive power to local governments to decide on compensation." The six centrist cabinet members of the cabinet quit, which led Den Uyl to note that both himself and the leftist ministers had "seen in this fact reason to put their portfolios and functions at the disposal of the Queen."

The Labour Party entered the subsequent election under the banner "Vote for the Prime Minister". The Labour Party won by a landslide, receiving over 33% of the votes, a relatively large share in the divided politics of the Netherlands at that time, and 53 seats. Labour's coalition partner Democrats 66 also made gains, from 6 to 8 seats. However, its other coalition partner, the Political Party of Radicals, lost nearly all its seats, making it impossible for Den Uyl to form a new government that he could count on to support him in parliament. More than 200 days after the election, the Christian Democratic Appeal (a new party that was formed by Den Uyl's former coalition partners, the Catholic People's Party and the Anti-Revolutionary Party, joined by the smaller Christian Historical Union) formed a cabinet with the liberal People's Party for Freedom and Democracy, supported by a small majority of 77 seats (out of a total of 150).

After being opposition leader from 1977 to 1981, Den Uyl returned to government in 1981. The Labour Party formed a coalition with the Christian Democratic Appeal and the Democrats 66. Den Uyl became Deputy Prime Minister and Minister for Social Affairs and Employment. Van Agt, by now Den Uyl's nemesis, led this cabinet. The cabinet was in constant internal conflict and fell after eight months. The Labour Party won the snap election of 1982, but could not agree on a new coalition with the Christian Democratic Appeal. As a result, Den Uyl returned to parliament and led the Labour Party in opposition until 1986. As leader of the main opposition party, Den Uyl, always a soft-spoken Atlanticist, provided cover for the government's controversial decision to place NATO cruise missiles on Dutch soil. In turn, this decision, and a similar one by the Belgian government, satisfied one of the West German conditions for the placement of cruise missiles and Pershing II missiles in West Germany.

== Family and later life ==
On 30 August 1944, Den Uyl married Liesbeth den Uyl, née Van Vessem (18 June 1924 – 30 September 1990). They had three sons and four daughters. Of those, the eldest Saskia Noorman-den Uyl became a member of parliament for the Labour Party herself serving from 1994 until 2006. Xander den Uyl became a leading figure in ABVAKABO, one of the Dutch labour unions and has served as Member of the Provincial-Council of North Holland for the Labour Party since 2011. After the elections of 1986, in which the Labour Party won 5 seats but failed to retain its position as largest party, Den Uyl was succeeded as leader of the Labour Party by Wim Kok. On 24 October 1987, the VU University Medical Center announced that Den Uyl had become terminally ill. He died exactly two months later, on Christmas Eve 1987, aged 68, of a brain tumour. Den Uyl lived in the Amsterdam neighbourhood of Buitenveldert from 1968 until his death.

== Honours and decorations ==
Honours
| Ribbon bar | Honour | Country | Date | Comment |
|---|---|---|---|---|
| | Knight of the Order of the Netherlands Lion | Netherlands | 5 December 1966 | |
| | Honorary Medal for Initiative and Ingenuity of the Order of the House of Orange | Netherlands | 19 September 1974 | |
| | Grand Officer of the Honorary Order of the Palm | Suriname | 4 September 1977 | |
| | Grand Officer of the Order of Orange-Nassau | Netherlands | 9 September 1982 | Elevated from Commander (11 April 1978) |

Honorary degrees
| University | Field | Country | Date | Comment |
|---|---|---|---|---|
| University of Amsterdam | Economics | Netherlands | 8 January 1985 | |

== Notes ==
Party political offices
| Preceded by Anne Vondeling | Leader of the Labour Party; 1966–1986 | Succeeded by Wim Kok |
| Preceded by Various | Lead candidate of the Labour Party; 1967, 1971, 1972, 1977; 1981, 1982, 1986 | Succeeded by Wim Kok |
| Preceded by Gerard Nederhorst | Parliamentary leader of the Labour Party in the House of Representatives; 1967–1973; 1977; 1978–1981; 1982–1986 | Succeeded by Ed van Thijn |
| Preceded by Ed van Thijn | Parliamentary leader of the Labour Party in the House of Representatives; 1967–1973; 1977; 1978–1981; 1982–1986 | Succeeded by Ed van Thijn |
| Preceded by Ed van Thijn | Parliamentary leader of the Labour Party in the House of Representatives; 1967–1973; 1977; 1978–1981; 1982–1986 | Succeeded by Wim Meijer |
| Preceded by Wim Meijer | Parliamentary leader of the Labour Party in the House of Representatives; 1967–1973; 1977; 1978–1981; 1982–1986 | Succeeded by Wim Kok |
| Preceded by Robert Pontillon | President of the Party of European Socialists; 1980–1987 | Succeeded by Vítor Constâncio |
Political offices
| Preceded by Koos Andriessen | Minister of Economic Affairs; 1965–1966 | Succeeded by Joop Bakker |
| Preceded by Barend Biesheuvel | Prime Minister of the Netherlands; Minister of General Affairs; 1973–1977 | Succeeded by Dries van Agt |
| Preceded by Gaston Thorn | President of the European Council; 1976 | Succeeded by James Callaghan |
| Preceded by Hans Wiegel | Deputy Prime Minister; 1981–1982; With: Jan Terlouw | Succeeded by Jan Terlouw |
| Preceded by Wil Albeda as Minister of Social Affairs | Minister of Social Affairs and Employment; 1981–1982 | Succeeded by Louw de Graaf |
| Preceded by Fons van der Stee | Minister for Netherlands; Antilles Affairs; 1981–1982 | Succeeded by Jan de Koning |
