= List of female cabinet members of the Netherlands =

The cabinet of the Netherlands has had female members since 1953. Anna de Waal served as the first female cabinet member as State Secretary for Education, Arts and Sciences appointed on 2 February 1953. Marga Klompé was the first female cabinet minister as Minister of Social Work appointed on 13 October 1956.

== First holders ==
Position	First Holder	Appointed	Number of Holders
Prime Minister	None	None	0
Deputy Prime Minister	Annemarie Jorritsma	3 August 1998	9
Deputy Prime Minister	Els Borst	3 August 1998	9
Minister of the Interior	Ien Dales	7 November 1989	7
Minister of Foreign Affairs	Sigrid Kaag	25 May 2021	2
Minister of Finance	Sigrid Kaag	10 January 2022	1 (1 acting)
Minister of Justice	Winnie Sorgdrager	22 August 1994	2 (1 acting)
Minister of Economic Affairs	Annemarie Jorritsma	3 August 1998	3
Minister of Defence	Jeanine Hennis-Plasschaert	5 November 2012	3
Minister of Health	Irene Vorrink	11 May 1973	7
Minister of Social Affairs	Karien van Gennip	10 January 2022	1
Minister of Education	Maria van der Hoeven	22 July 2002	4 (1 acting)
Minister of Transport	Neelie Kroes	4 November 1982	8
Minister of Agriculture	Gerda Verburg	22 February 2007	3
Minister of Housing	Margreeth de Boer	22 August 1994	5 (1 acting)
Minister of Social Work	Marga Klompé	13 October 1956	3
Minister for Development; Cooperation	Eegje Schoo	4 November 1982	7
State Secretary for the Interior	Saskia Stuiveling	11 September 1981	5
State Secretary for Foreign Affairs	Agnes van Ardenne	22 July 2002	1
State Secretary for Finance	Alexandra van Huffelen	29 January 2020	3
State Secretary for Justice	Bert Haars	28 December 1977	7
State Secretary for Economic Affairs	Yvonne van Rooy	30 October 1986	5
State Secretary for Defence	Barbara Visser	26 October 2017	1
State Secretary for Health	Els Veder-Smit	3 January 1978	8
State Secretary for Social Affairs	Ien Dales	11 September 1981	9
State Secretary for Social Affairs	Hedy d'Ancona	11 September 1981	9
State Secretary for Education	Anna de Waal	2 February 1953	10
State Secretary for Transport	Neelie Kroes	28 December 1977	8
State Secretary for Agriculture	Geke Faber	3 August 1998	2
State Secretary for Housing	Siepie de Jong	11 September 1981	1
State Secretary for Social Work	Fia van Veenendaal- van Meggelen	28 July 1971	2

== First holders in acting capacity ==
Position	First Holder	Appointed
Minister of Education	Marga Klompé	7 November 1961
Minister of Foreign Affairs	Sigrid Kaag	13 February 2018

== Second Drees cabinet ==
Cabinet Member(s)		Position(s)	Term of office	Party
Anna de Waal	Dr. Anna de Waal (1906–1981)	State Secretary for Education, Arts and Sciences	2 February 1953 – 13 October 1956	Catholic; People's Party
Source: (in Dutch) Kabinet-Drees II Rijksoverheid

== Third Drees cabinet ==
Cabinet Member(s)		Position(s)	Term of office	Party
Marga Klompé	Dr. Marga Klompé (1912–1986)	Minister of Social Work	13 October 1956 – 22 December 1958	Catholic; People's Party
Anna de Waal	Dr. Anna de Waal (1906–1981)	State Secretary for Education, Arts and Sciences	13 October 1956 – 16 March 1957	Catholic; People's Party
Source: (in Dutch) Kabinet-Drees III Rijksoverheid

== Second Beel cabinet ==
Cabinet Member(s)		Position(s)	Term of office	Party
Marga Klompé	Dr. Marga Klompé (1912–1986)	Minister of Social Work	22 December 1958 – 19 May 1959	Catholic; People's Party
Source: (in Dutch) Kabinet-Beel II Rijksoverheid

== De Quay cabinet ==
Cabinet Member(s)		Position(s)	Term of office	Party
Marga Klompé	Dr. Marga Klompé (1912–1986)	Ad interim Minister of Education, Arts and Sciences	7 November 1961 – 4 February 1962	Catholic; People's Party
Marga Klompé	Dr. Marga Klompé (1912–1986)	Ad interim Minister of Education, Arts and Sciences	23 April 1963 – 24 July 1963	Catholic; People's Party
Marga Klompé	Dr. Marga Klompé (1912–1986)	Minister of Social Work	19 May 1959 – 24 July 1963	Catholic; People's Party
Source: (in Dutch) Kabinet-De Quay Rijksoverheid

== Marijnen cabinet ==
Cabinet Member(s)		Position(s)	Term of office	Party
Jo Schouwenaar-Franssen	Jo Schouwenaar-Franssen (1909–1995)	Minister of Social Work	24 July 1963 – 14 April 1965	People's Party for Freedom and Democracy
Source: (in Dutch) Kabinet-Marijnen Rijksoverheid

== Zijlstra cabinet ==
Cabinet Member(s)		Position(s)	Term of office	Party
Marga Klompé	Dr. Marga Klompé (1912–1986)	Minister of Culture, Recreation and Social Work	22 November 1966 – 5 April 1967	Catholic; People's Party
Source: (in Dutch) Kabinet-Zijlstra Rijksoverheid

== De Jong cabinet ==
Cabinet Member(s)		Position(s)	Term of office	Party
Marga Klompé	Dr. Marga Klompé (1912–1986)	Minister of Culture, Recreation and Social Work	5 April 1967 – 6 July 1971	Catholic; People's Party
Source: (in Dutch) Kabinet-De Jong Rijksoverheid

== First Biesheuvel cabinet ==
Cabinet Member(s)		Position(s)	Term of office	Party
Fia van Veenendaal-van Meggelen	Fia van Veenendaal- van Meggelen (1918–2005)	State Secretary for Culture, Recreation and Social Work	28 July 1971 – 21 July 1972	Democratic; Socialists '70
Source: (in Dutch) Kabinet-Biesheuvel Rijksoverheid

== Den Uyl cabinet ==
Cabinet Member(s)		Position(s)	Term of office	Party
Irene Vorrink	Irene Vorrink (1918–1996)	Minister of Health and Environment	11 May 1973 – 19 December 1977	Labour Party
Source: (in Dutch) Kabinet-Den Uyl Rijksoverheid

== First Van Agt cabinet ==
Cabinet Member(s)		Position(s)	Term of office	Party
Til Gardeniers-Berendsen	Til Gardeniers-Berendsen (1925–2019)	Minister of Culture, Recreation and Social Work	19 December 1977 – 11 September 1981	Catholic; People's Party
Til Gardeniers-Berendsen	Til Gardeniers-Berendsen (1925–2019)	Minister of Culture, Recreation and Social Work	19 December 1977 – 11 September 1981	Christian; Democratic Appeal
Bert Haars	Bert Haars (1913–1997)	State Secretary for Justice	28 December 1977 – 11 September 1981	Christian Historical Union
Bert Haars	Bert Haars (1913–1997)	State Secretary for Justice	28 December 1977 – 11 September 1981	Christian; Democratic Appeal
Els Veder-Smit	Els Veder-Smit (1921–2020)	State Secretary for Health and Environment	3 January 1978 – 11 September 1981	People's Party for Freedom and Democracy
Neelie Kroes	Neelie Kroes (born 1941)	State Secretary for Transport and Water Management	28 December 1977 – 11 September 1981	People's Party for Freedom and Democracy
Jeltien Kraaijeveld-Wouters	Jeltien Kraaijeveld-Wouters (1932–2025)	State Secretary for Culture, Recreation and Social Work	28 December 1977 – 9 September 1981	Anti-Revolutionary Party
Jeltien Kraaijeveld-Wouters	Jeltien Kraaijeveld-Wouters (1932–2025)	State Secretary for Culture, Recreation and Social Work	28 December 1977 – 9 September 1981	Christian; Democratic Appeal
Source: (in Dutch) Kabinet-Van Agt I Rijksoverheid

== Second Van Agt cabinet ==
Cabinet Member(s)		Position(s)	Term of office	Party
Til Gardeniers-Berendsen	Til Gardeniers-Berendsen (1925–2019)	Minister of Health and Environment	11 September 1981 – 29 May 1982	Christian; Democratic Appeal
Saskia Stuiveling	Saskia Stuiveling (1945–2017)	State Secretary for the Interior	11 September 1981 – 29 May 1982	Labour Party
Ineke Lambers-Hacquebard	Ineke Lambers-Hacquebard (1946–2014)	State Secretary for Health and Environment	11 September 1981 – 29 May 1982	Democrats 66
Ien Dales	Ien Dales (1931–1994)	State Secretary for Social; Affairs and Employment	11 September 1981 – 29 May 1982	Labour Party
Hedy d'Ancona	Hedy d'Ancona (born 1937)	State Secretary for Social; Affairs and Employment	11 September 1981 – 29 May 1982	Labour Party
Siepie de Jong	Siepie de Jong (born 1940)	State Secretary for Housing and Spatial Planning	11 September 1981 – 29 May 1982	Labour Party
Source: (in Dutch) Kabinet-Van Agt II Rijksoverheid

== Third Van Agt cabinet ==
Cabinet Member(s)		Position(s)	Term of office	Party
Til Gardeniers-Berendsen	Til Gardeniers-Berendsen (1925–2019)	Minister of Health and Environment	29 May 1982 – 4 November 1982	Christian; Democratic Appeal
Til Gardeniers-Berendsen	Til Gardeniers-Berendsen (1925–2019)	Ad interim Minister of Culture, Recreation and Social Work	11 October 1982 – 4 November 1982	Christian; Democratic Appeal
Ineke Lambers-Hacquebard	Ineke Lambers-Hacquebard (1946–2014)	State Secretary for Health and Environment	29 May 1982 – 4 November 1982	Democrats 66
Source: (in Dutch) Kabinet-Van Agt III Rijksoverheid

== First Lubbers cabinet ==
Cabinet Member(s)		Position(s)	Term of office	Party
Neelie Kroes	Neelie Kroes (born 1941)	Minister of Transport and Water Management	4 November 1982 – 14 July 1986	People's Party for Freedom and Democracy
Eegje Schoo	Eegje Schoo (born 1944)	Minister for Development; Cooperation	4 November 1982 – 14 July 1986	People's Party for Freedom and Democracy
Virginie Korte-van Hemel	Virginie Korte-van Hemel (1929–2014)	State Secretary for Justice	8 November 1982 – 14 July 1986	Christian; Democratic Appeal
Annelien Kappeyne van de Coppello	Annelien Kappeyne van de Coppello (1936–1990)	State Secretary for Social; Affairs and Employment	8 November 1982 – 14 July 1986	People's Party for Freedom and Democracy
Nell Ginjaar-Maas	Nell Ginjaar-Maas (1931–2012)	State Secretary for Education and Sciences	5 November 1982 – 14 July 1986	People's Party for Freedom and Democracy
Source: (in Dutch) Kabinet-Lubbers I Rijksoverheid

== Second Lubbers cabinet ==
Cabinet Member(s)		Position(s)	Term of office	Party
Neelie Kroes	Neelie Kroes (born 1941)	Minister of Transport and Water Management	14 July 1986 – 7 November 1989	People's Party for Freedom and Democracy
Dieuwke de Graaff-Nauta	Dieuwke de Graaff-Nauta (1930–2008)	State Secretary for the Interior	14 July 1986 – 7 November 1989	Christian; Democratic Appeal
Virginie Korte-van Hemel	Virginie Korte-van Hemel (1929–2014)	State Secretary for Justice	14 July 1986 – 7 November 1989	Christian; Democratic Appeal
Yvonne van Rooy	Yvonne van Rooy (born 1951)	State Secretary for Economic Affairs	30 October 1986 – 7 November 1989	Christian; Democratic Appeal
Nell Ginjaar-Maas	Nell Ginjaar-Maas (1931–2012)	State Secretary for Education and Sciences	14 July 1986 – 7 November 1989	People's Party for Freedom and Democracy
Source: (in Dutch) Kabinet-Lubbers II Rijksoverheid

== Third Lubbers cabinet ==
Cabinet Member(s)		Position(s)	Term of office	Party
Ien Dales	Ien Dales (1931–1994)	Minister of the Interior	7 November 1989 – 10 January 1994	Labour Party
Dieuwke de Graaff-Nauta	Dieuwke de Graaff-Nauta (1930–2008)	Minister of the Interior	27 May 1994 – 22 Augustus 1994	Christian; Democratic Appeal
Dieuwke de Graaff-Nauta	Dieuwke de Graaff-Nauta (1930–2008)	State Secretary for the Interior	7 November 1989 – 27 May 1994	Christian; Democratic Appeal
Hedy d'Ancona	Hedy d'Ancona (born 1937)	Minister of Welfare, Health and Culture	7 November 1989 – 16 July 1994	Labour Party
Hanja Maij-Weggen	Hanja Maij-Weggen (born 1943)	Minister of Transport and Water Management	7 November 1989 – 16 July 1994	Christian; Democratic Appeal
Yvonne van Rooy	Yvonne van Rooy (born 1951)	State Secretary for Economic Affairs	28 September 1990 – 22 August 1994	Christian; Democratic Appeal
Elske ter Veld	Elske ter Veld (1944–2017)	State Secretary for Social; Affairs and Employment	7 November 1989 – 4 June 1993	Labour Party
Source: (in Dutch) Kabinet-Lubbers III Rijksoverheid

== First Kok cabinet ==
Cabinet Member(s)		Position(s)	Term of office	Party
Winnie Sorgdrager	Winnie Sorgdrager (born 1948)	Minister of Justice	22 August 1994 – 3 August 1998	Democrats 66
Els Borst	Dr. Els Borst (1932–2014)	Minister of Health, Welfare and Sport	22 August 1994 – 3 August 1998	Democrats 66
Annemarie Jorritsma	Annemarie Jorritsma (born 1950)	Minister of Transport and Water Management	22 August 1994 – 3 August 1998	People's Party for Freedom and Democracy
Margreeth de Boer	Margreeth de Boer (born 1939)	Minister of Housing, Spatial; Planning and the Environment	22 August 1994 – 3 August 1998	Labour Party
	Tonny van de Vondervoort (born 1950)	State Secretary for the Interior	22 August 1994 – 3 August 1998	Labour Party
Elizabeth Schmitz	Elizabeth Schmitz (born 1938)	State Secretary for Justice	22 August 1994 – 3 August 1998	Labour Party
Anneke van Dok-van Weele	Anneke van Dok-van Weele (born 1947)	State Secretary for Economic Affairs	22 August 1994 – 3 August 1998	Labour Party
Erica Terpstra	Erica Terpstra (born 1943)	State Secretary for Health, Welfare and Sport	22 August 1994 – 3 August 1998	People's Party for Freedom and Democracy
Tineke Netelenbos	Tineke Netelenbos (born 1944)	State Secretary for Education, Culture and Science	22 August 1994 – 3 August 1998	Labour Party
Source: (in Dutch) Kabinet-Kok I Rijksoverheid

== Second Kok cabinet ==
Cabinet Member(s)		Position(s)	Term of office	Party
Annemarie Jorritsma	Annemarie Jorritsma (born 1950)	Deputy Prime Minister	3 August 1998 – 22 July 2002	People's Party for Freedom and Democracy
Annemarie Jorritsma	Annemarie Jorritsma (born 1950)	Minister of Economic Affairs	3 August 1998 – 22 July 2002	People's Party for Freedom and Democracy
Els Borst	Dr. Els Borst (1932–2014)	Deputy Prime Minister	3 August 1998 – 22 July 2002	Democrats 66
Els Borst	Dr. Els Borst (1932–2014)	Minister of Health, Welfare and Sport	3 August 1998 – 22 July 2002	Democrats 66
Tineke Netelenbos	Tineke Netelenbos (born 1944)	Minister of Transport and Water Management	3 August 1998 – 22 July 2002	Labour Party
Eveline Herfkens	Eveline Herfkens (born 1952)	Minister for Development; Cooperation	3 August 1998 – 22 July 2002	Labour Party
Ella Kalsbeek	Ella Kalsbeek (born 1955)	State Secretary for Justice	1 January 2001 – 22 July 2002	Labour Party
Margo Vliegenthart	Margo Vliegenthart (born 1958)	State Secretary for Health, Welfare and Sport	3 August 1998 – 22 July 2002	Labour Party
	Annelies Verstand (born 1949)	State Secretary for Social; Affairs and Employment	3 August 1998 – 22 July 2002	Democrats 66
Karin Adelmund	Karin Adelmund (1949–2005)	State Secretary for Education, Culture and Science	3 August 1998 – 22 July 2002	Labour Party
Monique de Vries	Monique de Vries (born 1947)	State Secretary for Transport and Water Management	3 August 1998 – 22 July 2002	People's Party for Freedom and Democracy
Geke Faber	Geke Faber (born 1952)	State Secretary for Agriculture, Nature and Fisheries	3 August 1998 – 22 July 2002	Labour Party
Source: (in Dutch) Kabinet-Kok II Rijksoverheid

== First Balkenende cabinet ==
Cabinet Member(s)		Position(s)	Term of office	Party
Maria van der Hoeven	Maria van der Hoeven (born 1949)	Minister of Education, Culture and Science	22 July 2002 – 27 May 2003	Christian; Democratic Appeal
Agnes van Ardenne	Agnes van Ardenne (born 1950)	State Secretary for Foreign Affairs	22 July 2002 – 27 May 2003	Christian; Democratic Appeal
	Clémence Ross- van Dorp (born 1957)	State Secretary for Health, Welfare and Sport	22 July 2002 – 27 May 2003	Christian; Democratic Appeal
Philomena Bijlhout	Philomena Bijlhout (born 1957)	State Secretary for Social Affairs and Employment	22 July 2002 – 24 July 2002	Pim Fortuyn List
Annette Nijs	Annette Nijs (born 1961)	State Secretary for Education, Culture and Science	22 July 2002 – 27 May 2003	People's Party for Freedom and Democracy
Melanie Schultz van Haegen	Melanie Schultz van Haegen (born 1970)	State Secretary for Transport and Water Management	22 July 2002 – 27 May 2003	People's Party for Freedom and Democracy
Source: (in Dutch) Kabinet-Balkenende I Rijksoverheid

== Second Balkenende cabinet ==
Cabinet Member(s)		Position(s)	Term of office	Party
Maria van der Hoeven	Maria van der Hoeven (born 1949)	Minister of Education, Culture and Science	27 May 2003 – 7 July 2006	Christian; Democratic Appeal
Karla Peijs	Karla Peijs (born 1944)	Minister of Transport and Water Management	27 May 2003 – 7 July 2006	Christian; Democratic Appeal
Sybilla Dekker	Sybilla Dekker (born 1942)	Minister of Housing, Spatial Planning and the Environment	23 May 2003 – 7 July 2006	People's Party for Freedom and Democracy
Agnes van Ardenne	Agnes van Ardenne (born 1950)	Minister for Development Cooperation	27 May 2003 – 7 July 2006	Christian; Democratic Appeal
Rita Verdonk	Rita Verdonk (born 1955)	Minister without Portfolio for Justice	27 May 2003 – 7 July 2006	People's Party for Freedom and Democracy
Karien van Gennip	Karien van Gennip (born 1968)	State Secretary for Economic Affairs	27 May 2003 – 7 July 2006	Christian; Democratic Appeal
	Clémence Ross- van Dorp (born 1957)	State Secretary for Health, Welfare and Sport	27 May 2003 – 7 July 2006	Christian; Democratic Appeal
Annette Nijs	Annette Nijs (born 1961)	State Secretary for Education, Culture and Science	27 May 2003 – 9 June 2004	People's Party for Freedom and Democracy
Medy van der Laan	Medy van der Laan (born 1968)	State Secretary for Education, Culture and Science	27 May 2003 – 3 July 2006	Democrats 66
Melanie Schultz van Haegen	Melanie Schultz van Haegen (born 1970)	State Secretary for Transport and Water Management	27 May 2003 – 7 July 2006	People's Party for Freedom and Democracy
Source: (in Dutch) Kabinet-Balkenende II Rijksoverheid

== Third Balkenende cabinet ==
Cabinet Member(s)		Position(s)	Term of office	Party
Rita Verdonk	Rita Verdonk (born 1955)	Ad Interim; Minister of Justice	21 September 2006 – 22 September 2006	People's Party for Freedom and Democracy
Rita Verdonk	Rita Verdonk (born 1955)	Minister without Portfolio for Justice	7 July 2006 – 14 December 2006	People's Party for Freedom and Democracy
Rita Verdonk	Rita Verdonk (born 1955)	Minister without Portfolio for Justice	14 December 2006 – 22 February 2007	People's Party for Freedom and Democracy
Maria van der Hoeven	Maria van der Hoeven (born 1949)	Minister of Education, Culture and Science	7 July 2006 – 22 February 2007	Christian; Democratic Appeal
Karla Peijs	Karla Peijs (born 1944)	Minister of Transport and Water Management	7 July 2006 – 22 February 2007	Christian; Democratic Appeal
Karla Peijs	Karla Peijs (born 1944)	Ad Interim; Minister of Housing, Spatial; Planning and the Environment	21 September 2006 – 26 September 2006	Christian; Democratic Appeal
Sybilla Dekker	Sybilla Dekker (born 1942)	Minister of Housing, Spatial; Planning and the Environment	7 July 2006 – 21 September 2006	People's Party for Freedom and Democracy
Agnes van Ardenne	Agnes van Ardenne (born 1950)	Minister for Development; Cooperation	7 July 2006 – 22 February 2007	Christian; Democratic Appeal
Karien van Gennip	Karien van Gennip (born 1968)	State Secretary for Economic Affairs	7 July 2006 – 22 February 2007	Christian; Democratic Appeal
	Clémence Ross- van Dorp (born 1957)	State Secretary for Health, Welfare and Sport	7 July 2006 – 22 February 2007	Christian; Democratic Appeal
Melanie Schultz van Haegen	Melanie Schultz van Haegen (born 1970)	State Secretary for Transport and Water Management	7 July 2006 – 22 February 2007	People's Party for Freedom and Democracy
Source: (in Dutch) Kabinet-Balkenende III Rijksoverheid

== Fourth Balkenende cabinet ==
Cabinet Member(s)		Position(s)	Term of office	Party
Guusje ter Horst	Dr. Guusje ter Horst (born 1952)	Minister of the Interior and Kingdom Relations	22 February 2007 – 23 February 2010	Labour Party
Maria van der Hoeven	Maria van der Hoeven (born 1949)	Minister of Economic Affairs	22 February 2007 – 14 October 2010	Christian; Democratic Appeal
Gerda Verburg	Gerda Verburg (born 1957)	Minister of Agriculture, Nature and Food Quality	22 February 2007 – 14 October 2010	Christian; Democratic Appeal
Jacqueline Cramer	Dr. Jacqueline Cramer (born 1951)	Minister of Housing, Spatial; Planning and the Environment	22 February 2007 – 23 February 2010	Labour Party
Tineke Huizinga	Tineke Huizinga (born 1960)	Minister of Housing, Spatial; Planning and the Environment	23 February 2010 – 14 October 2010	Christian Union
Tineke Huizinga	Tineke Huizinga (born 1960)	State Secretary for Transport and Water Management	22 February 2007 – 23 February 2010	Christian Union
Ella Vogelaar	Ella Vogelaar (1949–2019)	Minister without Portfolio for Housing	22 February 2007 – 14 November 2008	Labour Party
Ank Bijleveld	Ank Bijleveld (born 1962)	State Secretary for the Interior and Kingdom Relations	22 February 2007 – 14 October 2010	Christian; Democratic Appeal
Nebahat Albayrak	Nebahat Albayrak (born 1968)	State Secretary for Justice	22 February 2007 – 23 February 2010	Labour Party
Jet Bussemaker	Dr. Jet Bussemaker (born 1961)	State Secretary for Health, Welfare and Sport	22 February 2007 – 23 February 2010	Labour Party
Jetta Klijnsma	Jetta Klijnsma (born 1957)	State Secretary for Social Affairs and Employment	18 December 2008 – 23 February 2010	Labour Party
Marja van Bijsterveldt	Marja van Bijsterveldt (born 1961)	State Secretary for Education, Culture and Science	22 February 2007 – 14 October 2010	Christian; Democratic Appeal
Sharon Dijksma	Sharon Dijksma (born 1971)	State Secretary for Education, Culture and Science	22 February 2007 – 23 February 2010	Labour Party
Source: (in Dutch) Kabinet-Balkenende IV Rijksoverheid

== First Rutte cabinet ==
Cabinet Member(s)		Position(s)	Term of office	Party
Liesbeth Spies	Liesbeth Spies (born 1966)	Minister of the Interior and Kingdom Relations	16 December 2011 – 5 November 2012	Christian; Democratic Appeal
Edith Schippers	Edith Schippers (born 1964)	Minister of Health, Welfare and Sport	14 October 2010 – 5 November 2012	People's Party for Freedom and Democracy
Marja van Bijsterveldt	Marja van Bijsterveldt (born 1961)	Minister of Education, Culture and Science	14 October 2010 – 5 November 2012	Christian; Democratic Appeal
Melanie Schultz van Haegen	Melanie Schultz van Haegen (born 1970)	Minister of Infrastructure and the Environment	14 October 2010 – 5 November 2012	People's Party for Freedom and Democracy
Marlies Veldhuijzen van Zanten	Marlies Veldhuijzen van Zanten (born 1953)	State Secretary for Health, Welfare and Sport	14 October 2010 – 5 November 2012	Christian; Democratic Appeal
Source: (in Dutch) Kabinet-Rutte-Verhagen Rijksoverheid

== Second Rutte cabinet ==
Cabinet Member(s)		Position(s)	Term of office	Party
Jeanine Hennis-Plasschaert	Jeanine Hennis- Plasschaert (born 1973)	Minister of Defence	5 November 2012 – 4 October 2017	People's Party for Freedom and Democracy
Edith Schippers	Edith Schippers (born 1964)	Minister of Health, Welfare and Sport	5 November 2012 – 26 October 2017	People's Party for Freedom and Democracy
Jet Bussemaker	Dr. Jet Bussemaker (born 1961)	Minister of Education, Culture and Science	5 November 2012 – 26 October 2017	Labour Party
Melanie Schultz van Haegen	Melanie Schultz van Haegen (born 1970)	Minister of Infrastructure and the Environment	5 November 2012 – 26 October 2017	People's Party for Freedom and Democracy
Lilianne Ploumen	Lilianne Ploumen (born 1962)	Minister for Foreign Trade and Development Cooperation	5 November 2012 – 26 October 2017	Labour Party
Sharon Dijksma	Sharon Dijksma (born 1971)	State Secretary for Economic Affairs	18 December 2012 – 5 November 2015	Labour Party
Sharon Dijksma	Sharon Dijksma (born 1971)	State Secretary for Infrastructure and the Environment	5 November 2015 – 26 October 2017	Labour Party
Jetta Klijnsma	Jetta Klijnsma (born 1957)	State Secretary for Social Affairs and Employment	5 November 2012 – 26 October 2017	Labour Party
Wilma Mansveld	Wilma Mansveld (born 1962)	State Secretary for Infrastructure and the Environment	5 November 2012 – 28 October 2015	Labour Party
Source: (in Dutch) Kabinet-Rutte-Asscher Rijksoverheid

== Third Rutte cabinet ==
Cabinet Member(s)		Position(s)	Term of office	Party
Kajsa Ollongren	Jonkvrouw; Kajsa Ollongren (born 1967)	Deputy; Prime Minister	26 October 2017 – 1 November 2019 14 April 2020 – 10 January 2022	Democrats 66
Kajsa Ollongren	Jonkvrouw; Kajsa Ollongren (born 1967)	Minister of the Interior and Kingdom Relations	26 October 2017 – 1 November 2019 14 April 2020 – 10 January 2022	Democrats 66
Carola Schouten	Carola Schouten (born 1977)	Deputy; Prime Minister	26 October 2017 – 10 January 2022	Christian Union
Carola Schouten	Carola Schouten (born 1977)	Minister of Agriculture, Nature and Food Quality	26 October 2017 – 10 January 2022	Christian Union
Ank Bijleveld	Ank Bijleveld (born 1962)	Minister of Defence	26 October 2017 – 17 September 2021	Christian; Democratic Appeal
Ank Bijleveld	Ank Bijleveld (born 1962)	Minister without Portfolio for the Interior^{[Acting]}	1 November 2019 – 14 April 2020	Christian; Democratic Appeal
Ingrid van Engelshoven	Ingrid van Engelshoven (born 1966)	Minister of Education, Culture and Science	26 October 2017 – 10 January 2022	Democrats 66
Cora van Nieuwenhuizen	Cora van Nieuwenhuizen (born 1963)	Minister of Infrastructure and Water Management	26 October 2017 – 31 August 2021	People's Party for Freedom and Democracy
Barbara Visser	Barbara Visser (born 1977)	Minister of Infrastructure and Water Management	31 August 2021 – 10 January 2022	People's Party for Freedom and Democracy
Barbara Visser	Barbara Visser (born 1977)	State Secretary for Defence	26 October 2017 – 31 August 2021	People's Party for Freedom and Democracy
Sigrid Kaag	Sigrid Kaag (born 1961)	Minister for Foreign Trade and Development; Cooperation	26 October 2017 – 10 August 2021	Democrats 66
Sigrid Kaag	Sigrid Kaag (born 1961)	Minister of Foreign Affairs	13 February 2018 – 7 March 2018^{[Acting]}	Democrats 66
Sigrid Kaag	Sigrid Kaag (born 1961)	Minister of Foreign Affairs	10 August 2021 – 16 September 2021	Democrats 66
Tamara van Ark	Tamara van Ark (born 1974)	Minister without Portfolio for Health	9 July 2020 – 3 September 2021	People's Party for Freedom and Democracy
Tamara van Ark	Tamara van Ark (born 1974)	State Secretary for Social Affairs and Employment	26 October 2017 – 9 July 2020	People's Party for Freedom and Democracy
Stientje van Veldhoven	Stientje van Veldhoven (born 1973)	Minister without Portfolio for the Interior^{[Acting]}	1 November 2019 – 14 April 2020	Democrats 66
Stientje van Veldhoven	Stientje van Veldhoven (born 1973)	State Secretary for Infrastructure and Water Management	26 October 2017 – 1 November 2019	Democrats 66
Stientje van Veldhoven	Stientje van Veldhoven (born 1973)	State Secretary for Infrastructure and Water Management	14 April 2020 – 19 July 2021	Democrats 66
Alexandra van Huffelen	Alexandra van Huffelen (born 1968)	State Secretary for Finance	29 January 2020 – 10 January 2022	Democrats 66
Ankie Broekers-Knol	Ankie Broekers- Knol (born 1946)	State Secretary for Justice and Security	11 July 2019 – 10 January 2022	People's Party for Freedom and Democracy
Mona Keijzer	Mona Keijzer (born 1968)	State Secretary for Economic Affairs and Climate Policy	26 October 2017 – 25 September 2021	Christian; Democratic Appeal
Source: (in Dutch) Kabinet-Rutte III Rijksoverheid

== Fourth Rutte cabinet ==
Cabinet Member(s)		Position(s)	Term of office	Party
Sigrid Kaag	Sigrid Kaag (born 1961)	First Deputy; Prime Minister	10 January 2022 – 8 January 2024	Democrats 66
Sigrid Kaag	Sigrid Kaag (born 1961)	Minister of Finance	10 January 2022 – 8 January 2024	Democrats 66
Karien van Gennip	Karien van Gennip (born 1968)	Second Deputy; Prime Minister	5 September 2023 – 2 July 2024	Christian; Democratic Appeal
Karien van Gennip	Karien van Gennip (born 1968)	Minister of Social Affairs and Employment	10 January 2022 – 2 July 2024	Christian; Democratic Appeal
Carola Schouten	Carola Schouten (born 1977)	Third Deputy; Prime Minister	10 January 2022 – 2 July 2024	Christian Union
Carola Schouten	Carola Schouten (born 1977)	Minister for Poverty Policy, Participation and Pensions	10 January 2022 – 2 July 2024	Christian Union
Carola Schouten	Carola Schouten (born 1977)	Ad Interim; Minister of Agriculture, Nature and Food Quality	5 September 2022 – 4 October 2023	Christian Union
Hanke Bruins Slot	Hanke; Bruins Slot (born 1977)	Minister of Foreign Affairs	5 September 2023 – 2 July 2024	Christian; Democratic Appeal
Hanke Bruins Slot	Hanke; Bruins Slot (born 1977)	Minister of the Interior and Kingdom Relations	10 January 2022 – 5 September 2023	Christian; Democratic Appeal
Dilan Yeşilgöz-Zegerius	Dilan Yeşilgöz (born 1977)	Minister of Justice and Security	10 January 2022 – 2 July 2024	People's Party for Freedom and Democracy
Micky Adriaansens	Micky; Adriaansens (born 1964)	Minister of Economic Affairs and Climate Policy	10 January 2022 – 2 July 2024	People's Party for Freedom and Democracy
Kajsa Ollongren	Jonkvrouw; Kajsa Ollongren (born 1967)	Minister of Defence	10 January 2022 – 2 July 2024	Democrats 66
Liesje Schreinemacher	Liesje; Schreinemacher (born 1983)	Minister for Foreign Trade and Development; Cooperation	10 January 2022 – 4 December 2023	People's Party for Freedom and Democracy
Liesje Schreinemacher	Liesje; Schreinemacher (born 1983)	Minister for Foreign Trade and Development; Cooperation	15 April 2024 – 2 July 2024	People's Party for Freedom and Democracy
Liesje Schreinemacher	Liesje; Schreinemacher (born 1983)	Ad Interim; Minister of Foreign Affairs	1 September 2023 – 5 September 2023	People's Party for Freedom and Democracy
Conny Helder	Conny Helder (born 1958)	Minister of Health, Welfare and Sport	10 January 2024 – 2 July 2024	People's Party for Freedom and Democracy
Conny Helder	Conny Helder (born 1958)	Minister for Long-term care and Sport	10 January 2022 – 10 January 2024	People's Party for Freedom and Democracy
Christianne van der Wal	Christianne van der Wal (born 1973)	Minister for Nature and Nitrogen Policy	10 January 2022 – 2 July 2024	People's Party for Freedom and Democracy
Alexandra van Huffelen	Alexandra van Huffelen (born 1968)	State Secretary for the Interior and Kingdom Relations	10 January 2022 – 2 July 2024	Democrats 66
Aukje de Vries	Aukje de Vries (born 1964)	State Secretary for Finance	10 January 2022 – 2 July 2024	People's Party for Freedom and Democracy
Gunay Uslu	Dr. Gunay Uslu (born 1972)	State Secretary for Education, Culture and Science	10 January 2022 – 1 December 2023	Democrats 66
Vivianne Heijnen	Vivianne; Heijnen (born 1982)	State Secretary for Infrastructure and Water Management	10 January 2022 – 24 May 2024	Christian; Democratic Appeal
Mariëlle Paul	Mariëlle Paul (born 1966)	Minister for Primary and Secondary Education	21 July 2023 – 2 July 2024	People's Party for Freedom and Democracy
Pia Dijkstra	Pia Dijkstra (born 1954)	Minister for Medical Care	2 February 2024 – 2 July 2024	Democrats 66
Fleur Gräper	Fleur Gräper (born 1974)	State Secretary for Culture and Media	2 February 2024 – 2 July 2024	Democrats 66

== Schoof cabinet ==
Cabinet member		Title	Term of office		Party
Image	Name	Title	Start	End	Party
Fleur Agema	Fleur Agema	First Deputy Prime Minister	2 July 2024	3 June 2025	PVV
Fleur Agema	Fleur Agema	Minister of Health, Welfare and Sport	2 July 2024	3 June 2025	PVV
Sophie Hermans	Sophie Hermans	Deputy Prime Minister	2 July 2024	Incumbent	VVD
Sophie Hermans	Sophie Hermans	Minister of Climate Policy and Green Growth	2 July 2024	Incumbent	VVD
Mona Keijzer	Mona Keijzer	Deputy Prime Minister	2 July 2024	Incumbent	BBB
Mona Keijzer	Mona Keijzer	Minister of Housing and Spatial Planning	2 July 2024	Incumbent	BBB
Mona Keijzer	Mona Keijzer	Minister for Asylum and Migration	19 June 2025	Incumbent	BBB
Judith Uitermark	Judith Uitermark	Minister of the Interior and Kingdom Relations	2 July 2024	22 August 2025	NSC
	Femke Wiersma	Minister of Agriculture, Fisheries, Food Security and Nature	2 July 2024	Incumbent	BBB
Mariëlle Paul	Mariëlle Paul	State Secretary for Primary and Secondary Education and Equal Opportunities	2 July 2024	5 September 2025	VVD
Mariëlle Paul	Mariëlle Paul	Minister of Social Affairs and Employment	5 September 2025	Incumbent	VVD
	Daniëlle Jansen	Minister for Health, Welfare and Sport	19 June 2025	22 August 2025	NSC
Marjolein Faber	Marjolein Faber	Minister of Asylum and Migration	2 July 2024	3 June 2025	PVV
Reinette Klever	Reinette Klever	Minister for Foreign Trade and Development	2 July 2024	3 June 2025	PVV
Hanneke Boerma	Hanneke Boerma	State Secretary for Foreign Trade and Development	19 June 2025	22 August 2025	NSC
Mariëlle Paul	Aukje de Vries	State Secretary for Foreign Trade and Development	5 September 2025	Incumbent	VVD
Ingrid Coenradie	Ingrid Coenradie	State Secretary for Justice and Security	2 July 2024	3 June 2025	PVV
	Nora Achahbar	State Secretary for Benefits and Customs	2 July 2024	14 November 2024	NSC
	Sandra Palmen	State Secretary for Benefits and Redress	12 December 2024	22 August 2025	NSC
	Sandra Palmen	State Secretary for Benefits and Redress	5 September 2025	Incumbent	Indep.
Vicky Maeijer	Vicky Maeijer	State Secretary for Long-term and Social Care	2 July 2024	3 June 2025	PVV
	Nicki Pouw-Verweij	State Secretary for Long-term and Social Care	19 June 2025	Incumbent	BBB
Judith Tielen	Judith Tielen	State Secretary for Youth, Prevention and Sport	19 June 2025	Incumbent	VVD

^{Acting}
^{Ad Interim}
