= Frank de Grave =

Dutch politician (born 1955)

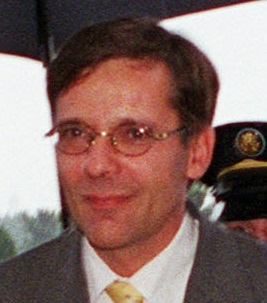
- De Grave in 2000

Extraordinary Member of the Council of State
- Incumbent
- Assumed office 3 September 2018
- Vice President: Piet Hein Donner (2018); Thom de Graaf (from 2018)

Member of the Senate
- In office 7 June 2011 – 3 September 2018

Minister of Defence
- In office 3 August 1998 – 22 July 2002
- Prime Minister: Wim Kok
- Preceded by: Joris Voorhoeve
- Succeeded by: Benk Korthals

State Secretary for Social Affairs and Employment
- In office 2 July 1996 – 3 August 1998
- Prime Minister: Wim Kok
- Preceded by: Robin Linschoten
- Succeeded by: Hans Hoogervorst

Mayor of Amsterdam
- Acting
- In office 18 January 1994 – 1 June 1994
- Preceded by: Ed van Thijn
- Succeeded by: Schelto Patijn

Member of the House of Representatives
- In office 23 May 2002 – 1 April 2004
- In office 19 May 1998 – 3 August 1998
- In office 16 September 1982 – 8 May 1990

Personal details
- Born: Franciscus Hendrikus Gerardus de Grave; 27 June 1955 (age 71) Amsterdam, Netherlands
- Party: People's Party for Freedom and Democracy (from 1975)
- Spouse: Dorienke Verkerk (m. 1985)
- Children: 2 children
- Education: University of Groningen (Bachelor of Laws, Master of Laws)
- Occupation: Politician · Civil servant · Jurist · Economist · Businessman · Banker · Corporate director · Nonprofit director · Trade association executive · Political consultant

Military service
- Allegiance: Netherlands
- Branch/service: Royal Netherlands Army
- Years of service: 1979–1980 (Conscription); 1980–1985 (Reserve)
- Rank: Lance corporal

Franciscus Hendrikus Gerardus "Frank" de Grave (born 27 June 1955) is a Dutch politician of the People's Party for Freedom and Democracy (VVD) and businessman. He is an Extraordinary Member of the Council of State since 3 September 2018.

De Grave attended a gymnasium in Assen from March 1967 until May 1973 and applied at the University of Groningen in July 1973 majoring in Law and obtaining a Bachelor of Laws degree in June 1975 before graduating with a Master of Laws degree in July 1979. De Grave was conscripted in the Royal Netherlands Army serving as a Lance corporal from October 1979 until November 1980. De Grave served as chairman of the Youth Organisation Freedom and Democracy (JOVD) from June 1978 until March 1980. De Grave worked as a political consultant for the People's Party for Freedom and Democracy from November 1980 until September 1982. De Grave served on the Municipal Council of Amsterdam from April 1982 until September 1982.

De Grave was elected to the House of Representatives in the 1982 general election, taking office on 16 September 1982. In May 1990, De Grave was appointed as an Alderman in Amsterdam, he resigned from the House of Representatives the same day he was installed as installed as an Alderman, taking office on 8 May 1990. De Grave served as acting Mayor of Amsterdam from 18 January 1994 until 1 June 1994 following the appointment of Ed van Thijn as Minister of the Interior in the Lubbers III cabinet. De Grave was appointed as State Secretary for Social Affairs and Employment in the Kok I cabinet following the resignation of Robin Linschoten, taking office on 2 July 1996. After the 1998 general election De Grave returned to the House of Representatives, taking office on 19 May 1998. Following the cabinet formation of 1998, De Grave was appointment as Minister of Defence in the Kok II cabinet, taking office on 3 August 1998. The cabinet resigned on 16 April 2002 following the conclusions of the NIOD report into the Srebrenica massacre during the Bosnian War and continued to serve in a demissionary capacity. After the 2002 general election, De Grave again returned to the House of Representatives, taking office on 23 May 2002. Following the cabinet formation of 2002 De Grave was not giving a cabinet post in the new Balkenende I cabinet, which took office on 22 July 2002, and he continued to serve in the House of Representatives as a frontbencher and spokesperson for finance. In March 2004, De Grave was nominated as chairman of the board of directors of the Council for Healthcare Supervision of the Ministry of Health, Welfare and Sport, he resigned from the House of Representatives the same day he was installed as chairman, taking office on 1 April 2004. In January 2006 the Council for Healthcare Supervision was renamed as the Healthcare Authority with De Grave continuing as chairman of the board of directors, serving from 1 January 2006 until 31 December 2008.

De Grave semi-retired from national politics and became active in the private sector and public sector and occupied numerous seats as a corporate director and nonprofit director on several boards of directors and supervisory boards (DSB Bank, DSM Company, Natura Artis Magistra, Verwey-Jonker Institute, Heart Foundation and the Public Pension Funds PFZW) and served on several state commissions and councils on behalf of the government (SEO Economic Research and the Social and Economic Council). De Grave also worked as a trade association executive for the Medical Specialists association serving as chairman from 25 November 2010 until 1 January 2017 and for the Public Libraries association serving as chairman since 1 November 2010. De Grave was elected as to the Senate in the 2011 Senate election, taking office on 7 June 2011 serving as a frontbencher chairing the parliamentary committee for Finances and spokesperson for economic affairs, privatization and organ transplantation. In August 2018, De Grave was nominated as Member of the Council of State, he resigned from the Senate the same day he was installed as a member of the Council of State, taking office on 3 September 2018.

== Decorations ==
Honours
Ribbon bar	Honour	Country	Date	Comment
	Grand Officer of the Order of Leopold II	Belgium	18 February 2000	
	Officer of the Order of Orange-Nassau	Netherlands	10 December 2002	

Political offices
Preceded by Ed van Thijn	Mayor of Amsterdam; Acting; 1994	Succeeded by Schelto Patijn
Preceded by Robin Linschoten	State Secretary for Social; Affairs and Employment; 1996–1998	Succeeded by Hans Hoogervorst
Preceded by Joris Voorhoeve	Minister of Defence; 1998–2002	Succeeded by Benk Korthals
Civic offices
Unknown	Chairman of the Supervisory board of the Council for Healthcare Supervision; 2004–2006	Succeeded by Himself as Chairman of the Supervisory board of the Dutch; Healthcare Authority
Preceded by Himself as Chairman of the Supervisory board of the Council for Healthcare Supervision	Chairman of the Supervisory board of the Healthcare Authority; 2006–2009	Succeeded by Marian Kaljouw
Business positions
Preceded by Ruud Koedijk	Chairman of the Supervisory board of Natura Artis Magistra; 2008–present	Incumbent
Preceded by Gerrit Zalm	CFO of the DSB Bank; 2009	Unknown
Unknown	Chairman of the Executive Board of the Federation of Medical Specialists; 2010–2017	Succeeded by Marcel Daniëls
Preceded by Ruud Koedijk	Chairman of the Supervisory board of Public Pension Funds PFZW; 2010–2018	Succeeded by Jet Bussemaker
Unknown	Chairman of the Executive Board of the Public Libraries association 2010–present	Incumbent
Non-profit organization positions
Preceded by Gijs de Vries	Chairman of the Executive Board of the Youth Organisation Freedom and Democracy; 1978–1980	Succeeded by Robert de Haze; Winkelman
Unknown	Chairman of the Supervisory board of the Verwey-Jonker Institute; 2010–present	Incumbent
Preceded by Eduard Klasen	Chairman of the Supervisory board of the Heart Foundation; 2019–present	Incumbent
