= Mariëtte Patijn =

Dutch politician (born 1966)

Member of the House of Representatives
- Incumbent
- Assumed office 9 December 2023

Personal details
- Born: 29 December 1966 (age 59) Voorburg, Netherlands
- Party: Labour Party (until 2026); PRO (since 2026)
- Parent: Schelto Patijn (father)

Mariëtte Patijn (born 29 December 1966) is a Dutch politician representing Progressief Nederland (PRO), and formerly the Labour Party (PvdA), who was elected to the House of Representatives in the 2023 Dutch general election.

== Biography ==
Patijn is the daughter of Schelto Patijn (1936–2007), who served as a member of parliament and as the mayor of Amsterdam on behalf of the Labour Party. After not completing several studies, she started her career as a secretary for the Federation of Dutch Trade Unions (FNV). She rose to the rank of union leader in her twenties, conducting negotiations for collective bargaining agreements, and later became the federation's vice chair and terms of employment coordinator. Patijn left the FNV in 2018 and subsequently started working for the Netherlands Labour Authority. She has told that she found the union's involvement too broad and that she preferred to focus on labour and wages.

She ran for the House of Representative in the 2023 general election as the sixth candidate on the shared GroenLinks–PvdA list and was elected. Patijn advocated for reducing flexible contracts, saying that fixed contracts would ensure more corporate earnings would go to wages rather than profits. Her focus in the House is on labor, income, and labor migration (formerly also integration).

=== House committee assignments ===
- Public Expenditure committee
- Committee for Finance
- Committee for Social Affairs and Employment

== Electoral history ==
Electoral history of Mariëtte Patijn
| Year | Body | Party | Pos. | Votes | Result | | Ref. |
| Year | Body | Party | Pos. | Votes | Party seats | Individual | Ref. |
|---|---|---|---|---|---|---|---|
| 2023 | House of Representatives | GroenLinks–PvdA | 6 | 11,388 | 25 | Won | |
| 2025 | House of Representatives | GroenLinks–PvdA | 14 | 3,404 | 20 | Won | |
