= Yvonne van Rooy =

Dutch politician and diplomat (born 1951)

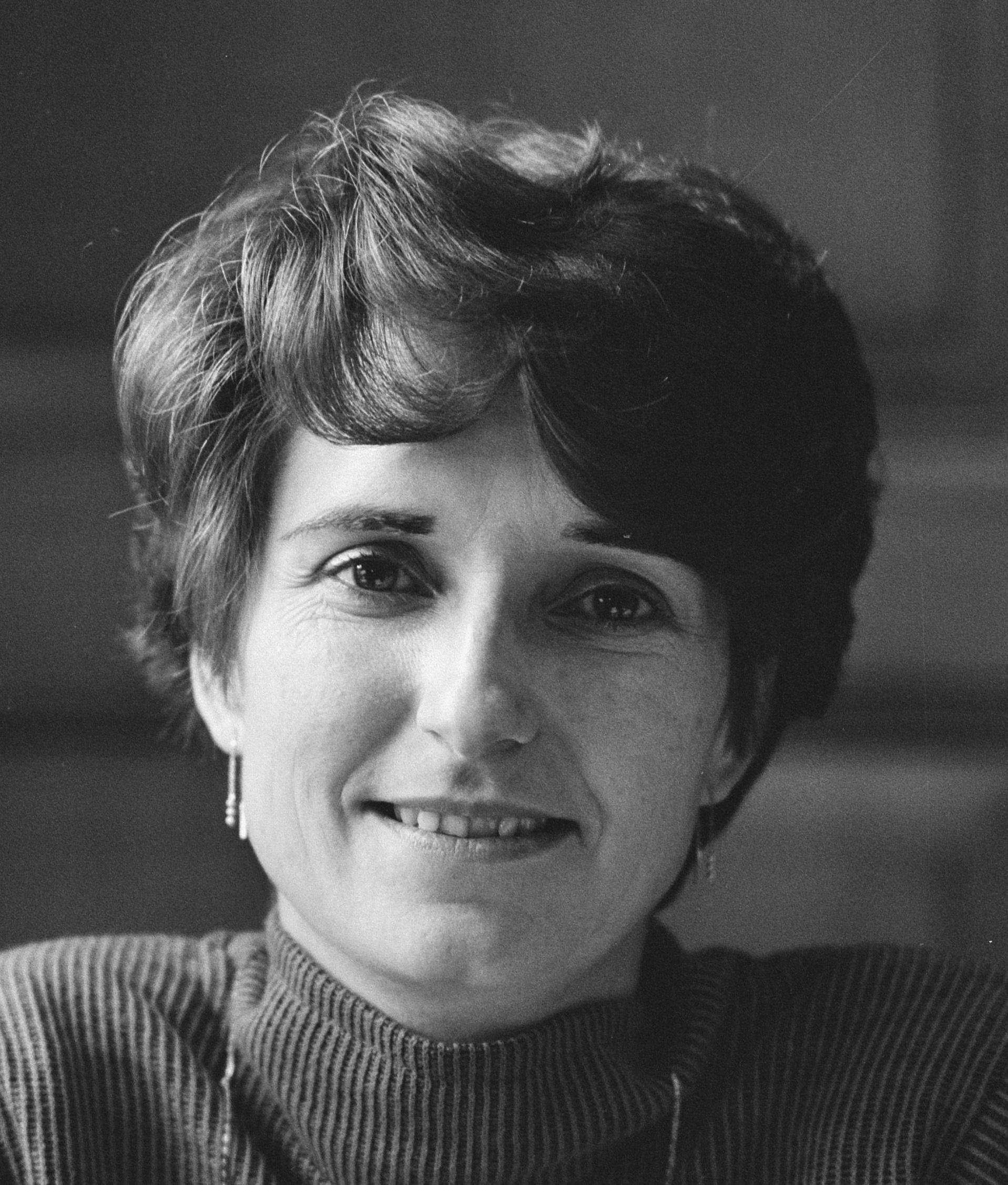
- van Rooy in 1986

Member of the Social and Economic Council
- In office 30 January 2008 – 1 December 2018
- Chairman: See list: Alexander Rinnooy Kan (2008–2011) Wiebe Draijer (2012–2014) Mariëtte Hamer (2014–2018)

Member of the House of Representatives
- In office 17 May 1994 – 1 September 1997
- In office 14 September 1989 – 28 September 1990
- Parliamentary group: Christian Democratic Appeal

State Secretary for Economic Affairs
- In office 28 September 1990 – 22 August 1994
- Prime Minister: Ruud Lubbers
- Preceded by: Piet Bukman
- Succeeded by: Anneke van Dok-van Weele
- In office 30 October 1986 – 7 November 1989 Serving with Albert-Jan Evenhuis
- Prime Minister: Ruud Lubbers
- Preceded by: Enneüs Heerma
- Succeeded by: Piet Bukman

Member of the European Parliament
- In office 24 July 1984 – 30 October 1986
- Parliamentary group: Group of the European; People's Party
- Constituency: Netherlands

Personal details
- Born: Yvonne Catharina Maria Theresia van Rooy; 4 June 1951 (age 75) Eindhoven, Netherlands
- Party: Christian Democratic Appeal (from 1980)
- Other political affiliations: Catholic People's Party (until 1980)
- Children: 1
- Parent: Charles van Rooy (1912–1996) (father)
- Education: Utrecht University (Bachelor of Laws, Master of Laws)
- Occupation: Politician · Diplomat · Civil servant · Jurist · Businesswoman · Corporate director · Nonprofit director · Trade association executive · Academic administrator

Yvonne Catharina Maria Theresia van Rooy (born 4 June 1951) is a Dutch politician and diplomat of the Christian Democratic Appeal (CDA) party and businesswoman.

== Biography ==
Born 4 June 1951, in Eindhoven, van Rooy attended a Gymnasium in Maastricht from May 1964 until June 1970 and applied at the Utrecht University in June 1970 majoring in Law and obtaining a Bachelor of Laws degree in July 1972 before graduating with a Master of Laws degree in July 1976. van Rooy worked as a paralegal for the Christian Employers' association (NCW) from November 1976 until July 1984.

van Rooy was elected as a Member of the European Parliament after the European Parliament election of 1984, taking office on 24 July 1984. van Rooy was appointed as State Secretary for Economic Affairs in the Cabinet Lubbers II following the appointment of Enneüs Heerma as State Secretary for Housing, Spatial Planning and the Environment, taking office on 30 October 1986. van Rooy was elected as a Member of the House of Representatives after the election of 1989, taking office on 14 September 1989. Following the cabinet formation of 1989 van Rooy was not giving a cabinet post in the new cabinet, the Cabinet Lubbers II was replaced by the Cabinet Lubbers III on 7 November 1989 and she continued to serve in the House of Representatives as a frontbencher and spokesperson for Development Cooperation. van Rooy was again appointed as State Secretary for Economic Affairs in the Cabinet Lubbers III following the appointment of Piet Bukman as Minister of Agriculture, Nature and Fisheries, taking office on 28 September 1990. After the election of 1994 van Rooy returned as a Member of the House of Representatives, taking office on 17 May 1994 serving as a frontbencher chairing the parliamentary committee for Kingdom Relations and spokesperson for Social Affairs, Transport and Water Management and Kingdom Relations.

In August 1997, van Rooy was named as Chairwoman of the Education board of the Tilburg University, she resigned as a Member of the House of Representatives the same day she was installed as chairwoman on 1 September 1997. In January 2004, van Rooy was named as Chairwoman of the Education board of the Utrecht University, she resigned as Chairwoman of the Education board of the Tilburg University the same day she was installed as Chairwoman of the Education board of the Utrecht University on 1 February 2004.

van Rooy also became active in the private sector and public sector and occupied numerous seats as a corporate director and nonprofit director on several boards of directors and supervisory boards (Philips, NN Group, Concertgebouw, Stichting Pensioenfonds Zorg en Welzijn, Gemeentemuseum Den Haag and the Social and Economic Council) and served on several state commissions and councils on behalf of the government (Advisory Council for Spatial Planning, Center for the Promotion of Imports, Accreditation Council and the Dutch Healthcare Authority). van Rooy also served as a trade association executive for the Nederlandse Vereniging van Ziekenhuizen (Hospitals association; NVZ) serving as chairwoman from 1 December 2012 until 1 December 2018.

== Decorations ==
Honours
Ribbon bar	Honour	Country	Date	Comment
	Knight of the Order of the Netherlands Lion	Netherlands	20 November 1989	
	Knight of the Order of the Holy Sepulchre	Holy See	21 March 1992	
	Commander of the Order of Orange-Nassau	Netherlands	8 October 1994	

Political offices
Preceded by Enneüs Heerma	State Secretary for Economic Affairs; 1986–1989; 1990–1994; With: Albert-Jan Evenhuis (1986–1989)	Succeeded by Piet Bukman
Preceded by Piet Bukman	State Secretary for Economic Affairs; 1986–1989; 1990–1994; With: Albert-Jan Evenhuis (1986–1989)	Succeeded by Anneke van Dok-van Weele
Civic offices
Preceded by Ed Nijpels	President of the Accreditation Council; 2018–present	Incumbent
Business positions
Preceded by Roelf de Boer	Chairwoman of the Nederlandse Vereniging van Ziekenhuizen; 2012–2019	Succeeded by Ad Melkert
Academic offices
Unknown	Chairwoman of the Supervisory board of the Tilburg University; 1997–2004	Succeeded by Hein van Oorschot
Unknown	Chairwoman of the Supervisory board of the Utrecht University; 2004–2012	Succeeded by Marjan Oudeman
