= Zilveren Kruis =

Dutch health insurance company (e. 1949)

Zilveren Kruis (Silver Cross) is a Dutch health insurance company, based in Leiden, which was founded in 1949. It is part of the Achmea group which was created in 1995 when it merged with the Avéro-Centraal Beheer Group.

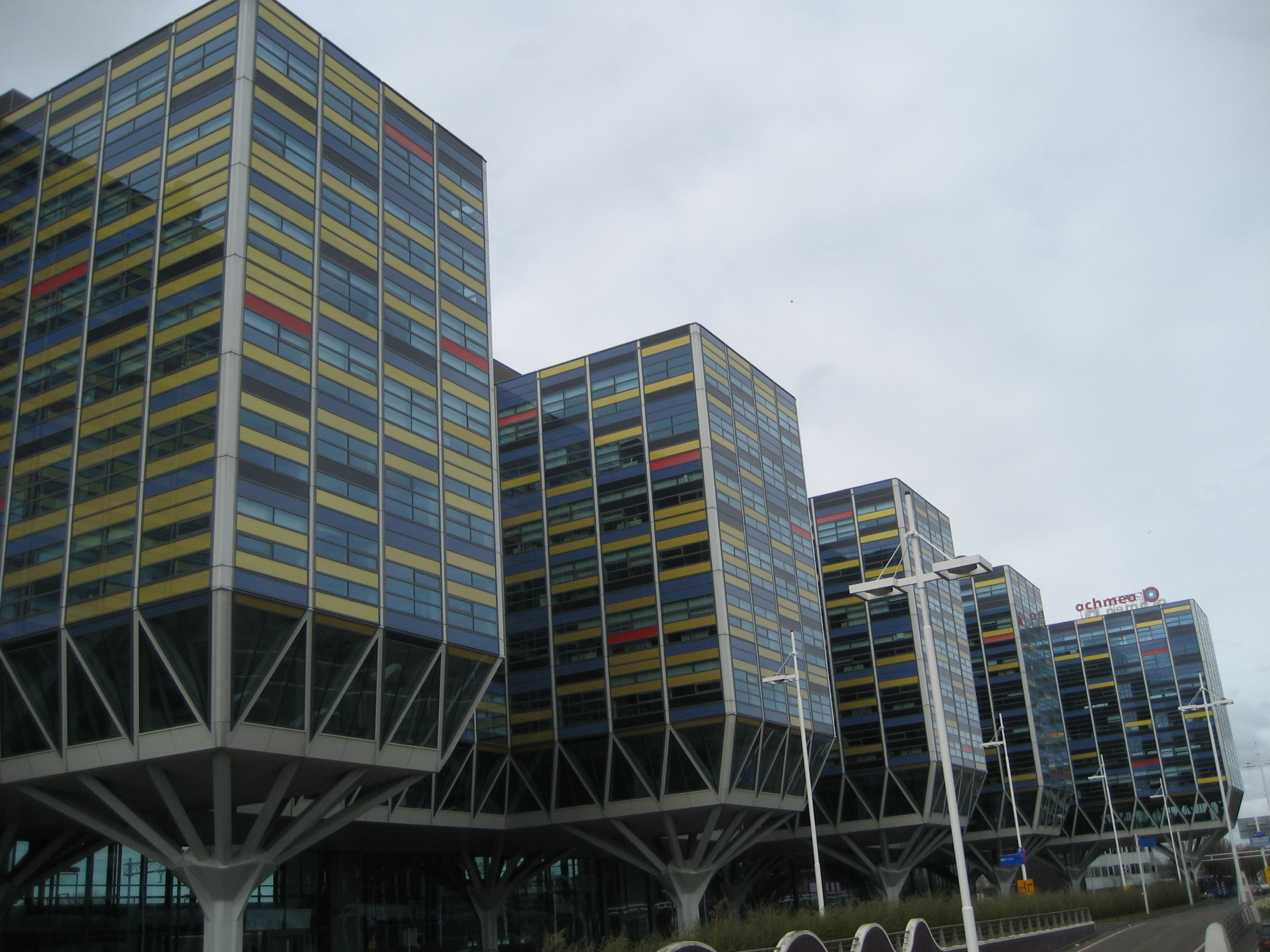
Zilveren Kruis Achmea building, Leiden

The Ziekenhuis Sint Jansdal, in Harderwijk, warned patients with the company's Basic Budget policy at the end of 2016 that their care was not covered after the bankruptcy of the MC IJsselmeer hospital in Lelystad. In December 2018 Bruno Bruins announced that it had been agreed that they would be covered.

It was warned by the Dutch Healthcare Authority in November 2018 about changes to policies introduced retrospectively in January 2018.

In December 2018 more than a hundred general practitioners refused to renew their contracts with the company because of a dispute over rates and conditions.
