= Jaap van der Doef =

Dutch politician (1934–2025)

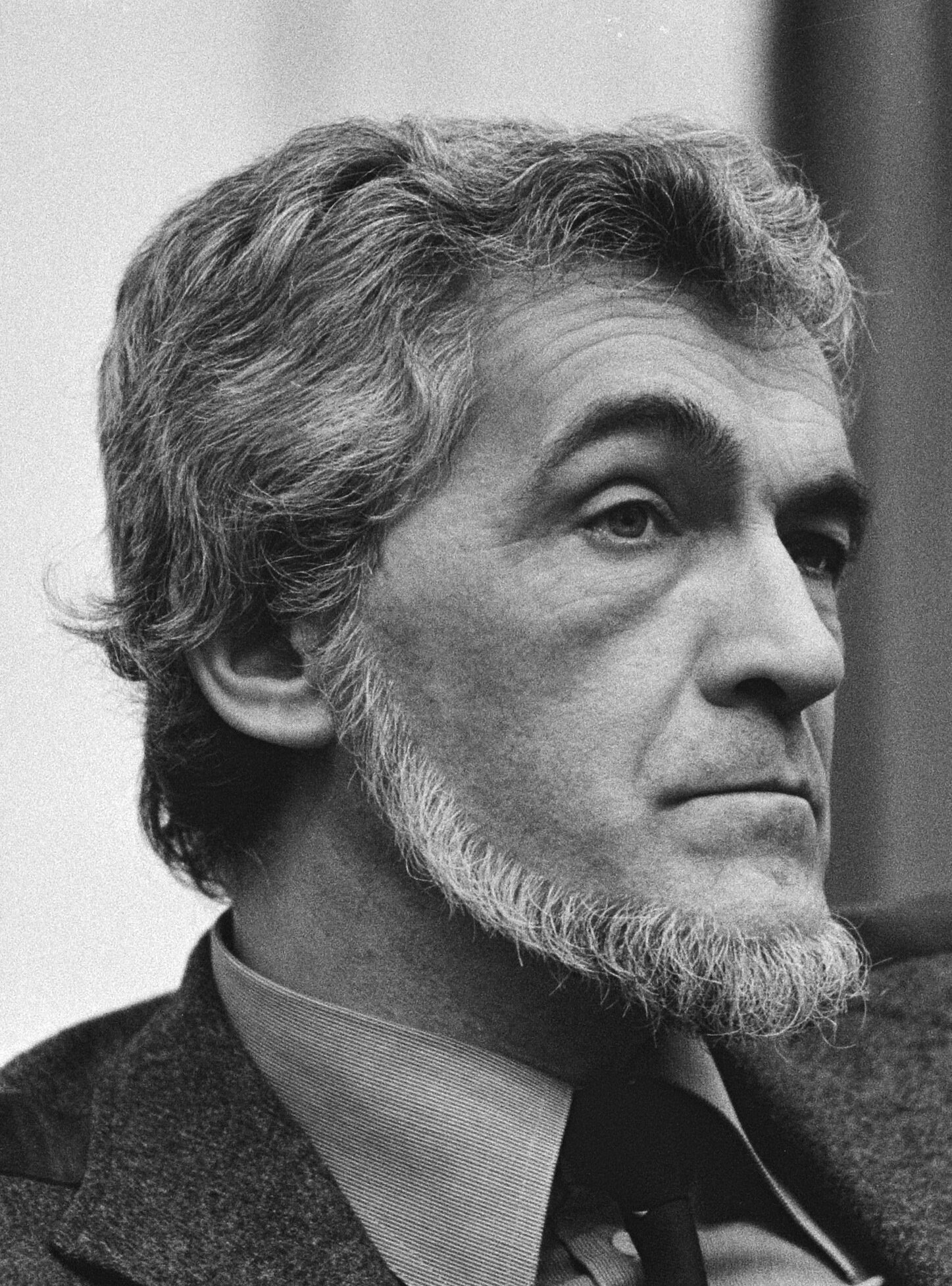
- Van der Doef in 1982

Mayor of Almere
- In office 1 June 2002 – 1 September 2002; Acting
- Preceded by: Hans Ouwerkerk
- Succeeded by: Hans Ouwerkerk

Mayor of Vlissingen
- In office 1 March 1986 – 1 May 1999
- Preceded by: Theo Westerhout
- Succeeded by: Anneke van Dok-van Weele

State Secretary for Transport and Water Management
- In office 11 September 1981 – 29 May 1982
- Prime Minister: Dries van Agt
- Preceded by: Neelie Kroes
- Succeeded by: Jaap Scherpenhuizen

Member of the House of Representatives
- In office 16 September 1982 – 1 March 1986
- In office 28 May 1973 – 11 September 1981
- Parliamentary group: Labour Party

Personal details
- Born: Jacobus Cornelus Theresia van der Doef; 9 April 1934 Doorn, Netherlands
- Died: 15 February 2025 (aged 90) Vlissingen, Netherlands
- Party: Labour Party (from 1966)
- Other political affiliations: Catholic People's Party (until 1966)
- Occupation: Politician; Trade union leader; Nonprofit director; Clerk

Jacobus Cornelus Theresia "Jaap" van der Doef (9 April 1934 – 15 February 2025) was a Dutch politician. A member of the Labour Party, he served in the House of Representatives from 1973 to 1981 and again from 1982 to 1986.

Van der Doef died in Vlissingen on 15 February 2025, at the age of 90.
