= Marga Klompé =

Dutch politician (1912–1986)

Her Excellency Marga Klompé
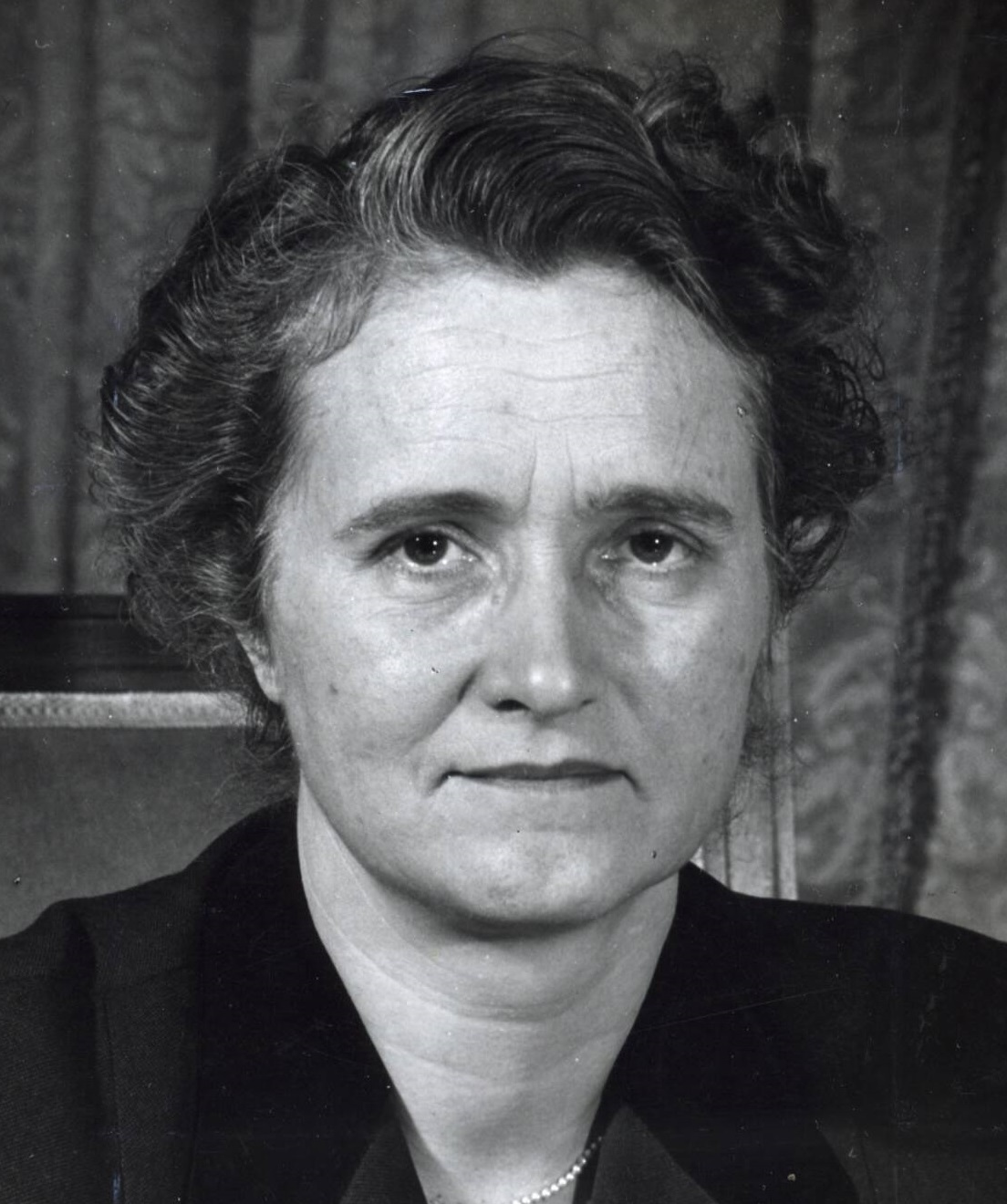
- Klompé in 1958

Minister of Culture, Recreation and Social Work
- In office 22 November 1966 – 6 July 1971
- Prime Minister: Jelle Zijlstra (1966–1967); Piet de Jong (1967–1971)
- Preceded by: Maarten Vrolijk
- Succeeded by: Piet Engels

Minister of Education, Arts and Sciences
- In office 23 April 1963 – 24 July 1963; Ad interim
- Prime Minister: Jan de Quay
- Preceded by: Jo Cals
- Succeeded by: Theo Bot
- In office 7 November 1961 – 4 February 1962; Ad interim
- Prime Minister: Jan de Quay
- Preceded by: Jo Cals
- Succeeded by: Jo Cals

Minister of Social Work
- In office 13 October 1956 – 24 July 1963
- Prime Minister: See list: Willem Drees (1956–1958) Louis Beel (1958–1959) Jan de Quay (1959–1963)
- Preceded by: Frans-Jozef van Thiel
- Succeeded by: Jo Schouwenaar-Franssen

Member of the European Coal and Steel Community Parliament
- In office 10 September 1952 – 16 October 1956
- Parliamentary group: Christian Democratic Group

Member of the House of Representatives
- In office 23 February 1967 – 5 April 1967
- In office 2 July 1963 – 22 November 1966
- In office 20 March 1959 – 19 May 1959
- In office 12 August 1948 – 13 October 1956

Personal details
- Born: Margaretha Albertina Maria Klompé; 16 August 1912 Arnhem, Netherlands
- Died: 28 October 1986 (aged 74) The Hague, Netherlands
- Party: Christian Democratic Appeal (from 1980)
- Other political affiliations: Catholic People's Party (1945–1980); Roman Catholic State Party (until 1945)
- Education: Utrecht University (Bachelor of Science, Bachelor of Mathematics, Master of Science, Master of Physics, Master of Mathematics, Doctor of Science)
- Occupation: Politician · Chemist · Mathematician · Physicist · Researcher · Nonprofit director · Teacher · Activist

Margaretha Albertina Maria "Marga" Klompé (16 August 1912 – 28 October 1986) was a Dutch politician of the Catholic People's Party (KVP) and chemist. She was granted the honorary title of Minister of State on 17 July 1971.

Klompé was known for her abilities as a manager and policy wonk. Recognized as one of the main architects of the post-war Dutch welfare state, Klompé was granted the honorary title of Minister of State on 17 July 1971 and continued to comment on political affairs as a stateswoman until her death at the age of 74 and holds the distinction as the first woman government minister in the Netherlands, the first woman awarded the honorary title of Minister of State, and the fifth longest-serving government minister after World War II with a total tenure of 11 years, 145 days.

== Early life ==
Margaretha Albertina Maria Klompé was born on 16 August 1912 in Arnhem in the Netherlands into a Catholic family of five children. Her father was the Dutch J. P. M. Klompé, who owned a stationery shop and her mother was the German-born A. M. J. A. Verdang.

Klompé attended a Gymnasium in Arnhem from June 1925 until June 1929 and applied at the Utrecht University in June 1929 majoring in Chemistry and obtaining a Bachelor of Science in Chemistry degree in April 1931 before graduating with a Master of Science in Chemistry degree in July 1932. During these years, and as a result of her studies, Klompé started to question several aspects of religion and in particular the institute itself. Following this crisis, Klompé's commitment to religion was reinforced which she combined with an open mind. Klompé lived outside the church for a number of years. But after finding her own orientation, more steeped in the mysticism of the Roman Catholic faith, she completely surrendered to it. She emerged from this personal crisis in a deep faithful way but left it with a lasting respect for other forms of faith.

Klompé worked as a science teacher at the Mater Dei High School for girls in Nijmegen from July 1932 until August 1949. Klompé returned to the Utrecht University in June 1933 for a postgraduate education in Physics and Mathematics obtaining a Bachelor of Science degree in physics and a Bachelor of Mathematics degree in July 1934 before graduating with a Master of Physics degree and a Master of Mathematics degree in July 1936.

On 10 May 1940 Nazi Germany invaded the Netherlands and the government fled to London to escape the German occupation. During the German occupation, Klompé continued her studies and got a doctorate as a Doctor of Science in Mathematics on 21 April 1941 and as a Doctor of Science in Physics on 30 April 1942. Klompé subsequently continued at the Utrecht University in June 1942 for another postgraduate education in Medicine but in April 1943 the German occupation authority closed the Utrecht University. Klompé joined the Dutch resistance against the German occupiers, as a messenger, soon after the invasion in May 1940.

== Political career ==
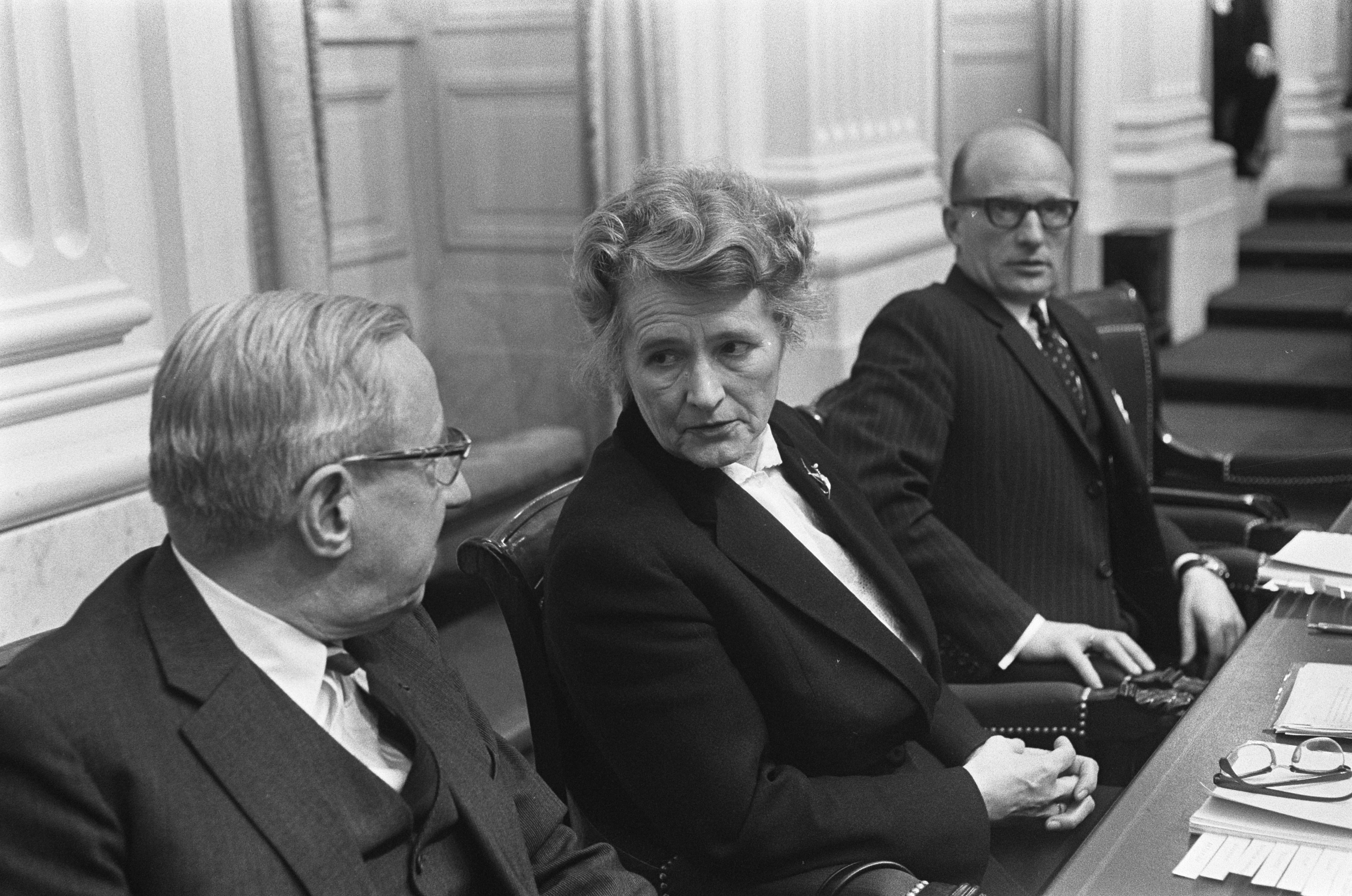
Deputy Prime Minister Jan de Quay, Minister Klompé and the Director of the Social Service Jan Verhoeven during the public broadcasting debate in the House of Representatives on 16 January 1967.

After the war, Klompé started to focus on politics, which was rather unusual for a woman at the time. Klompé worked as a political activist for the Dutch People's Movement from May 1945 until August 1948. Klompé became a Member of the House of Representatives after Johan van Maarseveen was appointed as Minister of the Interior in the Cabinet Drees-Van Schaik after the election of 1948, taking office on 12 August 1948 serving as a frontbencher and spokesperson for Social Work, Welfare, Media and deputy spokesperson for Education and Culture. She was part of the Dutch parliamentary delegation accredited to the first-ever meeting of the Consultative Assembly of the Council of Europe in August 1949, one of only nine women thought to have attended out of 187 members. Klompé was selected as a Member of the European Coal and Steel Community Parliament and dual served in those positions, taking office on 10 September 1952. After the election of 1956 Klompé was appointed as Minister of Social Work in the Cabinet Drees III, taking office on 13 October 1956. The Cabinet Drees III fell on 11 December 1958 and continued to serve in a demissionary capacity until the cabinet formation of 1958 when it was replaced by the caretaker Cabinet Beel II with Klompé continuing as Minister of Social Work, taking office on 22 December 1958.

After the election of 1959 Klompé returned as a Member of the House of Representatives, taking office on 20 March 1959. Following the cabinet formation of 1959 Klompé continued as Minister of Social Work in the Cabinet De Quay, taking office on 19 May 1959. Klompé served as acting Minister of Education, Arts and Sciences from 7 November 1961 until 4 February 1962 and again from 23 April 1963 until 24 July 1963 during two medical leave of absences of Jo Cals. Her main contribution was the passing of the Social Security Bill in 1963, which replaced the previous Poverty Bill.

After the election of 1963 Klompé again returned as a Member of the House of Representatives, taking office on 2 July 1963. Following the cabinet formation of 1963 Klompé per her own request asked not to be considered for a cabinet post in the new cabinet, the Cabinet De Quay was replaced by the Cabinet Marijnen on 24 July 1963 and she continued serving in the House of Representatives serving as a frontbencher chairing the parliamentary committee for Social Work and the special parliamentary committee for Parliamentary Procedures and spokesperson for Social Affairs, Education, Social Work, Welfare, Culture and Equality. On 14 October 1966 the incumbent Cabinet Cals fell and continued to serve in a demissionary capacity until the cabinet formation of 1966 when it was replaced by the caretaker Cabinet Zijlstra with Klompé again appointed as Minister of Culture, Recreation and Social Work, taking office on 22 November 1966.

After the election of 1967 Klompé once again returned as a Member of the House of Representatives, taking office 23 February 1967. Following the cabinet formation of 1967 Klompé remained as Minister of Culture, Recreation and Social Work in the Cabinet De Jong, taking office on 5 April 1967. In January 1971 Klompé announced her retirement from national politics and that she wouldn't stand for the election of 1971. The Cabinet De Jong was replaced by the Cabinet Biesheuvel I on 6 July 1971.

Prior to joining the KVP, Klompé had thought of becoming a member of the PvdA, but did not do so due to the socialist tradition. She instead joined the KVP which (as noted by one study) “presented itself as Christian-progressive.”

== Later life ==
Klompé retired after spending 23 years in national politics and became active in the public sector and occupied numerous seats as a nonprofit director on several boards of directors and supervisory boards (Bible Society, Dutch Women's Council, Bernard van Leer Foundation, Society of Prosperity, Dutch Cancer Society, SNV Development Organisation, Open Doors Foundation and the Pontifical Council for Justice and Peace) and served on several state commissions and councils on behalf of the government (Raad voor Cultuur, Nationale Adviescommissie Emancipatie, Staatsbosbeheer and the Onderwijsraad) and as an advocate and activist for Poverty reduction, Basic income, Women's rights and European integration.

Klompé was also a member of several national and international associations, such as the Council of Europe and the Joint Task Force for European Cooperation in Development. In addition, Klompé was involved in the Catholic community. She was a member of the national council for the Bishops' Conference, a member of the Papal Commission 'Justitia et Pax', and she also founded the union of Roman Catholic female graduates. Furthermore, Klompé supported the underprivileged in society. Therefore, her critics called her 'Our Lady of Perpetual Succour'. Klompé died on 28 October 1986 in The Hague.

== Decorations ==
Honours
Ribbon bar	Honour	Country	Date	Comment
	Knight of the Order of the Netherlands Lion	Netherlands	31 August 1955	
	Grand Cross of the Order of the Crown	Belgium	10 December 1968	
	Grand Officer of the Order of the Oak Crown	Luxembourg	30 July 1969	
	Knight Grand Cross of the Order of Orange-Nassau	Netherlands	17 July 1971	Elevated from Grand Officer (27 July 1963)
	Knight of the Order of the Holy Sepulchre	Holy See	16 August 1984	

Honorific Titles
Ribbon bar	Honour	Country	Date	Comment
	Minister of State	Netherlands	17 July 1971	Style of Excellency

Political offices
Preceded by Frans-Jozef van Thiel	Minister of Social Work; 1956–1963	Succeeded by Jo Schouwenaar-Franssen
Preceded by Jo Cals	Minister of Education, Arts and Sciences; 1961–1962; Ad interim 1963; Ad interim	Succeeded by Jo Cals
Preceded by Jo Cals	Minister of Education, Arts and Sciences; 1961–1962; Ad interim 1963; Ad interim	Succeeded by Theo Bot
Preceded by Maarten Vrolijk	Minister of Culture, Recreation and Social Work; 1966–1971	Succeeded by Piet Engels
