= Maarten Vrolijk =

Dutch politician

His Excellency Maarten Vrolijk
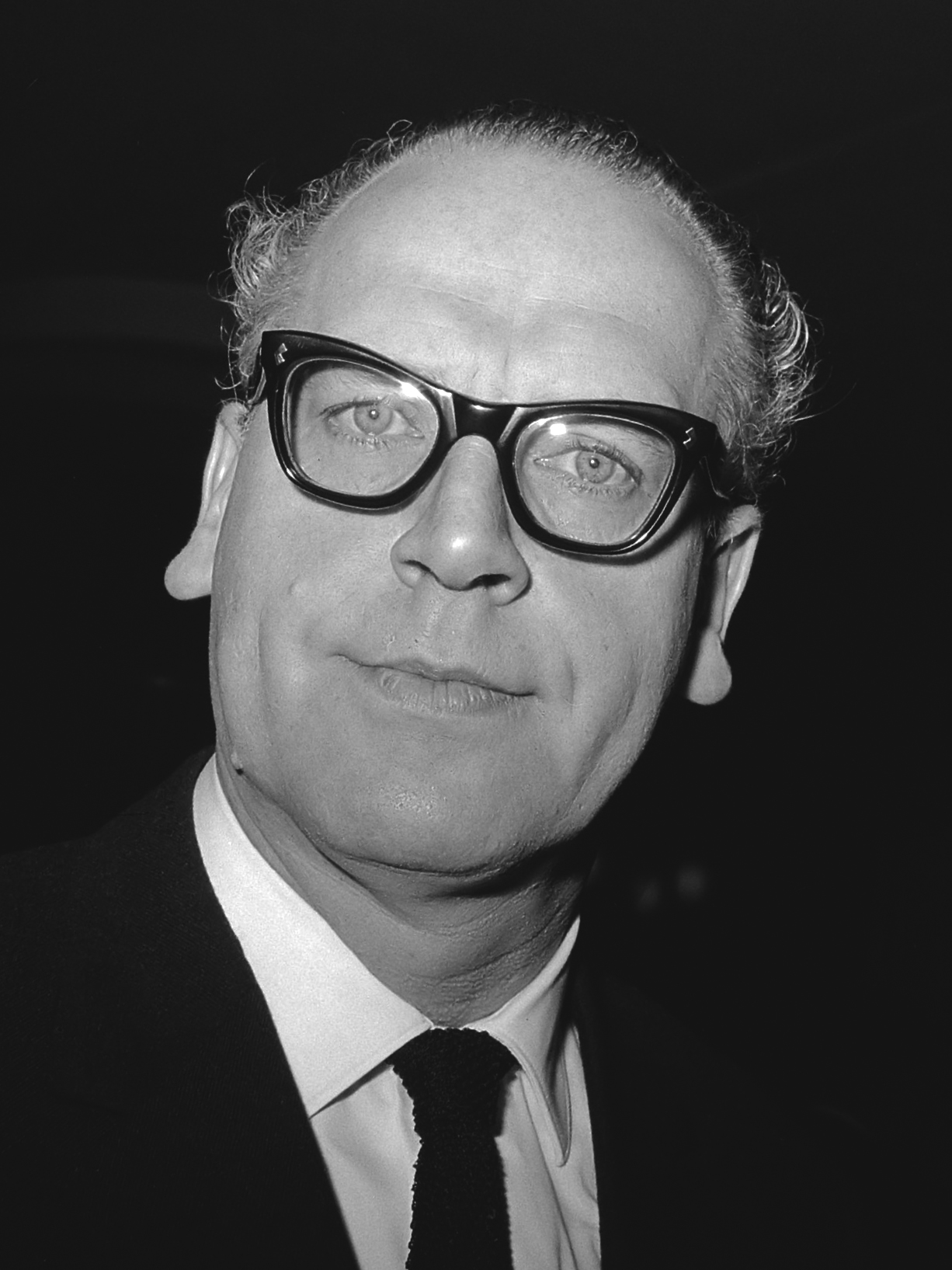
- Maarten Vrolijk in (1965)

Extraordinary Member of the Council of State
- In office 1 December 1984 – 1 June 1989
- Vice President: Willem Scholten

Queen's Commissioner of South Holland
- In office 1 April 1972 – 1 June 1984
- Monarchs: Juliana (1972–1980); Beatrix (1980–1984)
- Preceded by: Jan Klaasesz
- Succeeded by: Schelto Patijn

Minister of Culture, Recreation and Social Work
- In office 14 April 1965 – 22 November 1966
- Prime Minister: Jo Cals
- Preceded by: Jo Schouwenaar-Franssen as Minister of Social Work
- Succeeded by: Marga Klompé

Member of the House of Representatives
- In office 23 February 1967 – 10 March 1972
- In office 6 November 1956 – 5 June 1963
- Parliamentary group: Labour Party

Personal details
- Born: Maarten Vrolijk; 14 May 1919 Scheveningen, Netherlands
- Died: 7 February 1994 (aged 74) The Hague, Netherlands
- Party: Labour Party (from 1952)
- Education: Leiden University (Bachelor of Laws, Master of Laws)
- Occupation: Politician · Journalist · Poet · Author

Maarten Vrolijk (14 May 1919 – 7 February 1994) was a Dutch politician of the Labour Party (PvdA).

== Decorations ==
Honours
Ribbon bar	Honour	Country	Date
	Knight of the Order of the Netherlands Lion	Netherlands	5 December 1966
	Grand Officer of the Order of Orange-Nassau	Netherlands	1 June 1984

Political offices
Preceded by Jo Schouwenaar-Franssen as Minister of Social Work	Minister of Culture, Recreation and Social Work; 1965–1966	Succeeded by Marga Klompé
Preceded by Jan Klaasesz	Queen's Commissioner of South Holland; 1972–1984	Succeeded by Schelto Patijn
