= Neelie Kroes =

Dutch politician (born 1941)

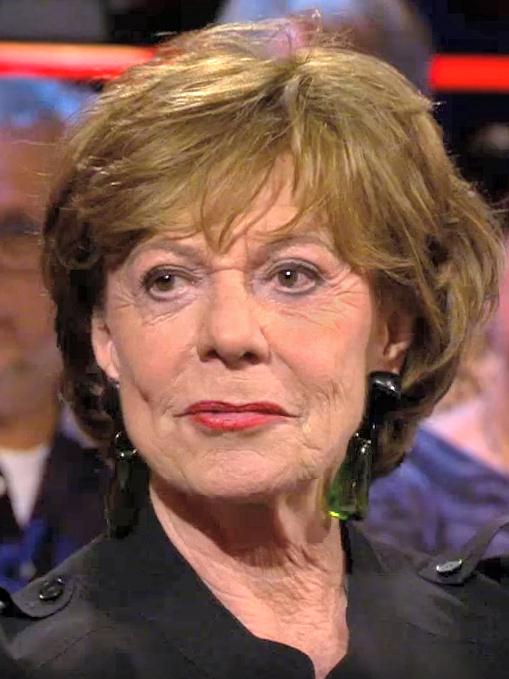
- Kroes in 2018

European Commissioner^{[Portfolios]}
- In office 22 November 2004 – 1 November 2014
- President: José Manuel Barroso
- Preceded by: Mario Monti; Competition; Viviane Reding; Information Society and Media
- Succeeded by: Joaquín Almunia; Competition; Günther Oettinger; Digital Economy and Society; Andrus Ansip; Digital Single Market

Minister of Transport and Water Management
- In office 4 November 1982 – 7 November 1989
- Prime Minister: Ruud Lubbers
- Preceded by: Henk Zeevalking
- Succeeded by: Hanja Maij-Weggen

State Secretary for Transport and Water Management
- In office 28 December 1977 – 11 September 1981
- Prime Minister: Dries van Agt
- Preceded by: Michel van Hulten
- Succeeded by: Jaap van der Doef

Member of the House of Representatives
- In office 3 June 1986 – 14 July 1986
- In office 25 August 1981 – 4 November 1982
- In office 3 August 1971 – 28 December 1977
- Parliamentary group: People's Party for Freedom and Democracy

Personal details
- Born: Neelie Kroes; 19 July 1941 (age 85) Rotterdam, Netherlands
- Party: People's Party for Freedom and Democracy (from 1966)
- Spouses: Wouter Jan Smit (m. 1965; div. 1991) Bram Peper (m. 1991; div. 2003)
- Children: Yvo Smit (born 1970)
- Education: Rotterdam School of Economics (BEc, M.Econ)
- Occupation: Politician · Economist · Researcher · Businessperson · Corporate director · Nonprofit director · Lobbyist

Neelie Kroes (Dutch pronunciation: [ˈneːli ˈkrus]; born 19 July 1941) is a retired Dutch politician of the People's Party for Freedom and Democracy (VVD) and businessperson who served as European Commissioner from 22 November 2004 to 1 November 2014.

Kroes studied Economics at the Rotterdam School of Economics obtaining a Master of Economics degree. Kroes worked as a researcher at her alma mater from September 1963 to April 1968, and as a corporate director for a transport company in Delft from April 1968 until August 1971, and for the chamber of commerce of Rotterdam from July 1969 until August 1971. Kroes became a Member of the House of Representatives shortly after the election of 1971 on 3 August 1971, and served as a frontbencher and spokesperson for Transport and Education. After the election of 1977 Kroes was appointed as State Secretary for Transport and Water Management in the Cabinet Van Agt–Wiegel taking office on 28 December 1977. After the election of 1981 Kroes returned to the House of Representatives on 25 August 1981, and again served as a frontbencher and spokesperson for Transport. After the election of 1982 Kroes was appointed as Minister of Transport and Water Management in the Cabinet Lubbers I taking office on 4 November 1982. After the election of 1986 Kroes continued her office in the Cabinet Lubbers II. In June 1989, Kroes announced that she wouldn't stand for the election of 1989.

Kroes semi-retired from active politics and became active in the private and public sectors as a corporate and non-profit director and served on several state commissions and councils on behalf of the government, and served as Rector Magnificus of the Nyenrode Business University from June 1991 until January 2000. In October 2004, Kroes was nominated as the next European Commissioner in the First Barroso Commission, and was given the heavy portfolio of Competition taking office on 22 November 2004. In November 2009, Kroes was re-nominated for a second term in the Second Barroso Commission, and was given the heavy portfolio of Digital Agenda and was appointed as one of the Vice-Presidents serving from 9 February 2010 until 1 November 2014.

Kroes retired from active politics at the age of 73 and again became active in the private and public sectors as a corporate and non-profit director and served as an occasional diplomat for several economic delegations on behalf of the government. Following her retirement Kroes continued to be active as an advocate and lobbyist for promoting startup companies and entrepreneurship. She holds the distinction as the first female Minister of Transport starting an informal tradition of women serving as Dutch Transport Ministers that has continued since 1982 (save for two exceptions 2002–2003 and 2007–2010) for over 43 year.

== Career before politics ==
Neelie Kroes was born on 19 July 1941 in Rotterdam, Netherlands. Her father owned the transport company Zwatra.

Kroes attended a Protestant grammar school in Rotterdam. She continued to a Protestant high school. In 1958, she went to study economics at the Erasmus University in Rotterdam. In 1961, Kroes was praeses of the R.V.S.V. (the largest Rotterdam sorority). She was also elected as a member of the University Council. After obtaining a Bachelor of Economics and later a Master of Economics degree in 1965, she became a research fellow at the economic faculty at that university. During this period Kroes was involved in the women's organisation within the VVD. In this period she also was member of the board of heavy transporting company "ZwaTra", the company of her father.

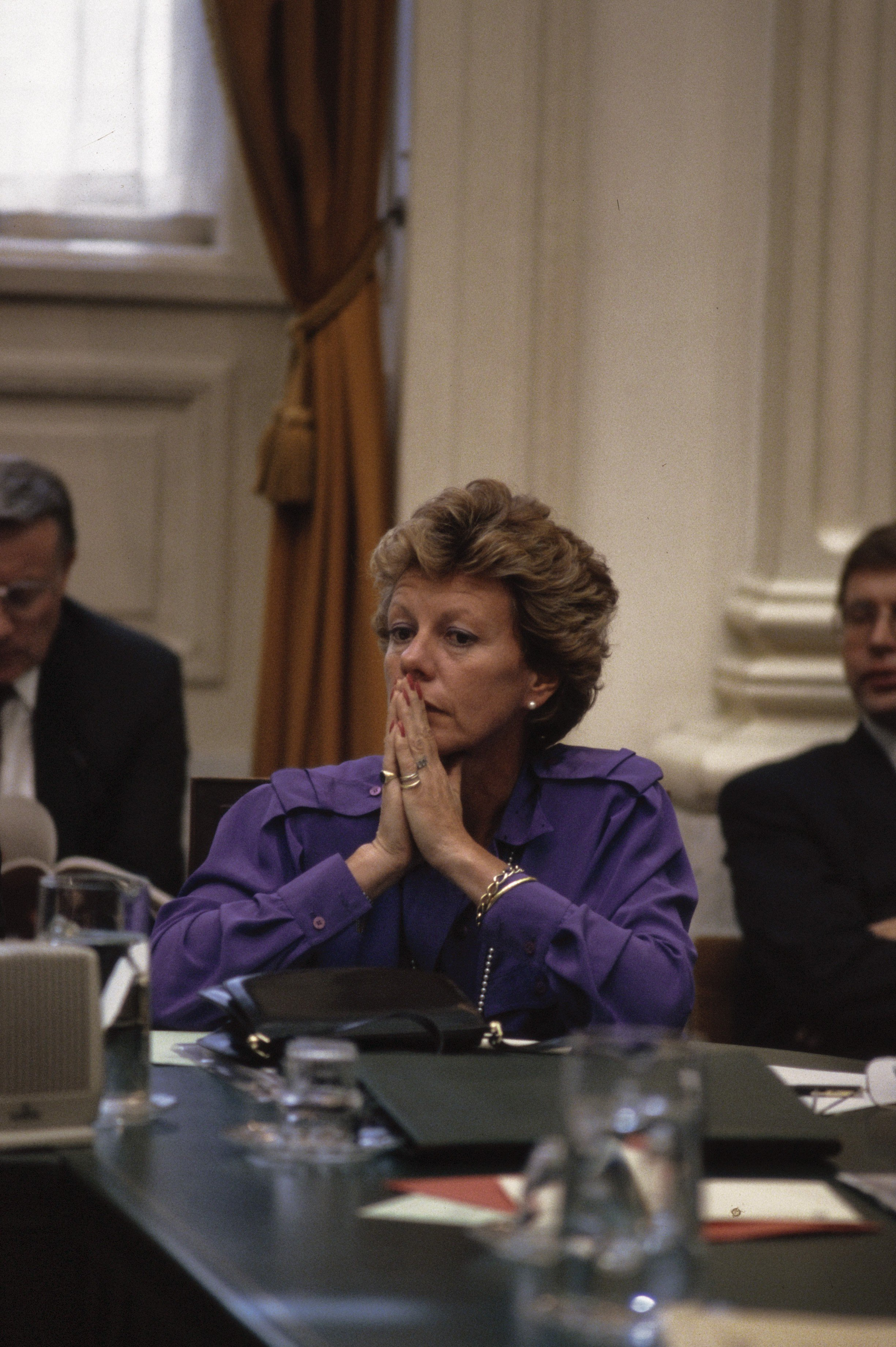
Minister Neelie Kroes in the House of Representatives on 30 July 1986.

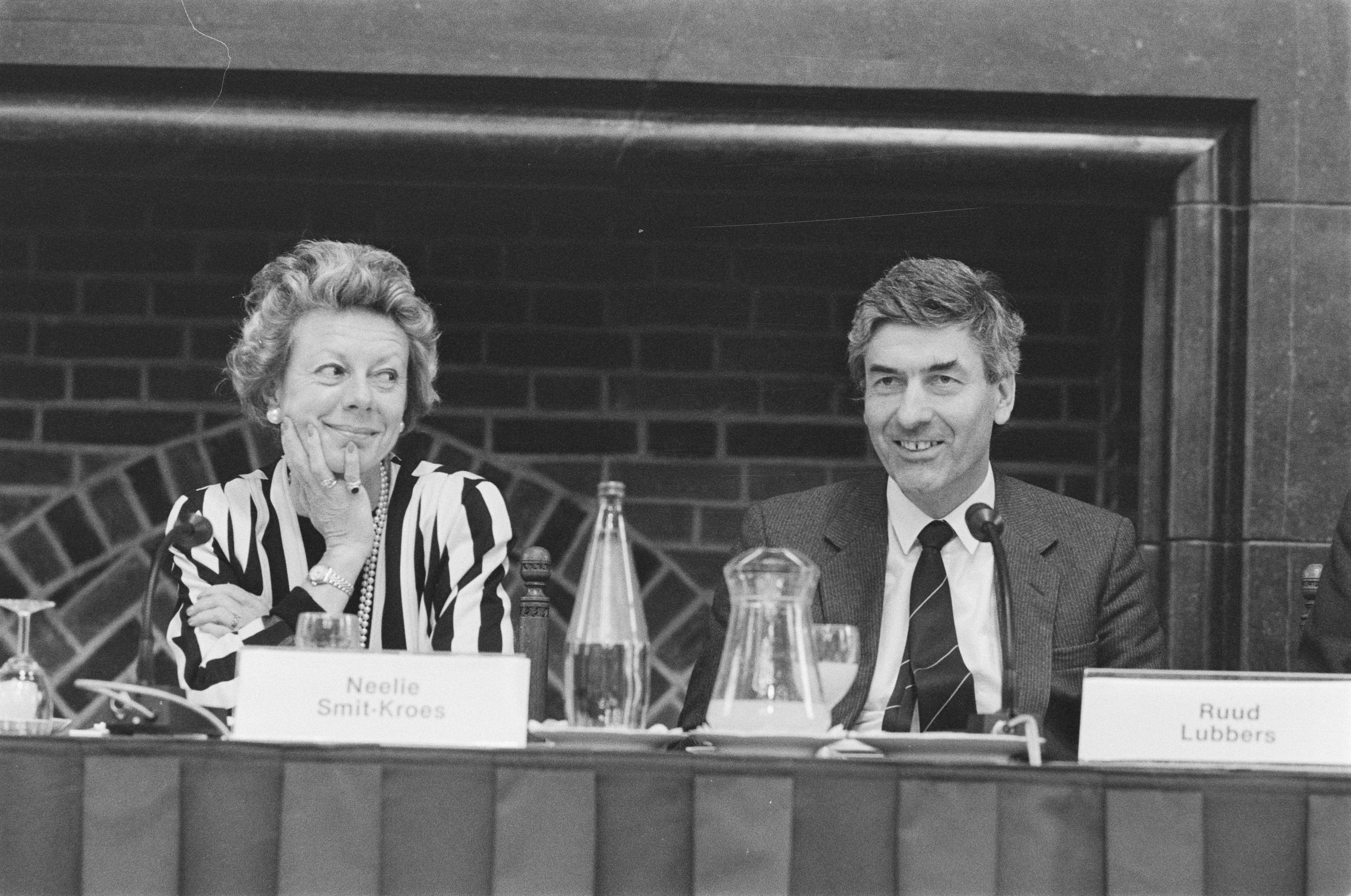
Minister Neelie Kroes and Prime Minister Ruud Lubbers at a press conference in The Hague on 20 May 1987.

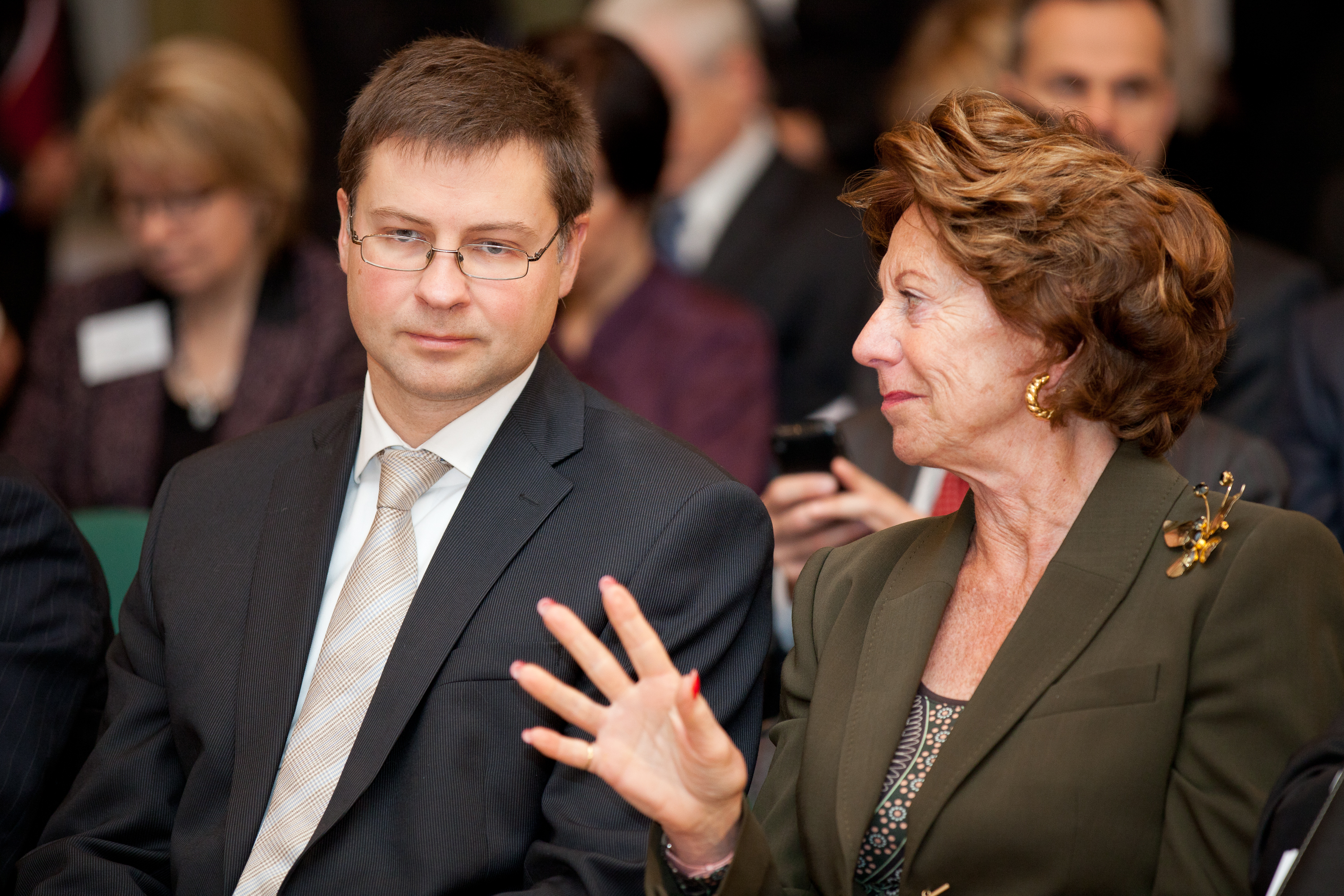
Prime Minister of Latvia Valdis Dombrovskis and European Commissioner Neelie Kroes at a meeting in Riga on 14 October 2011.

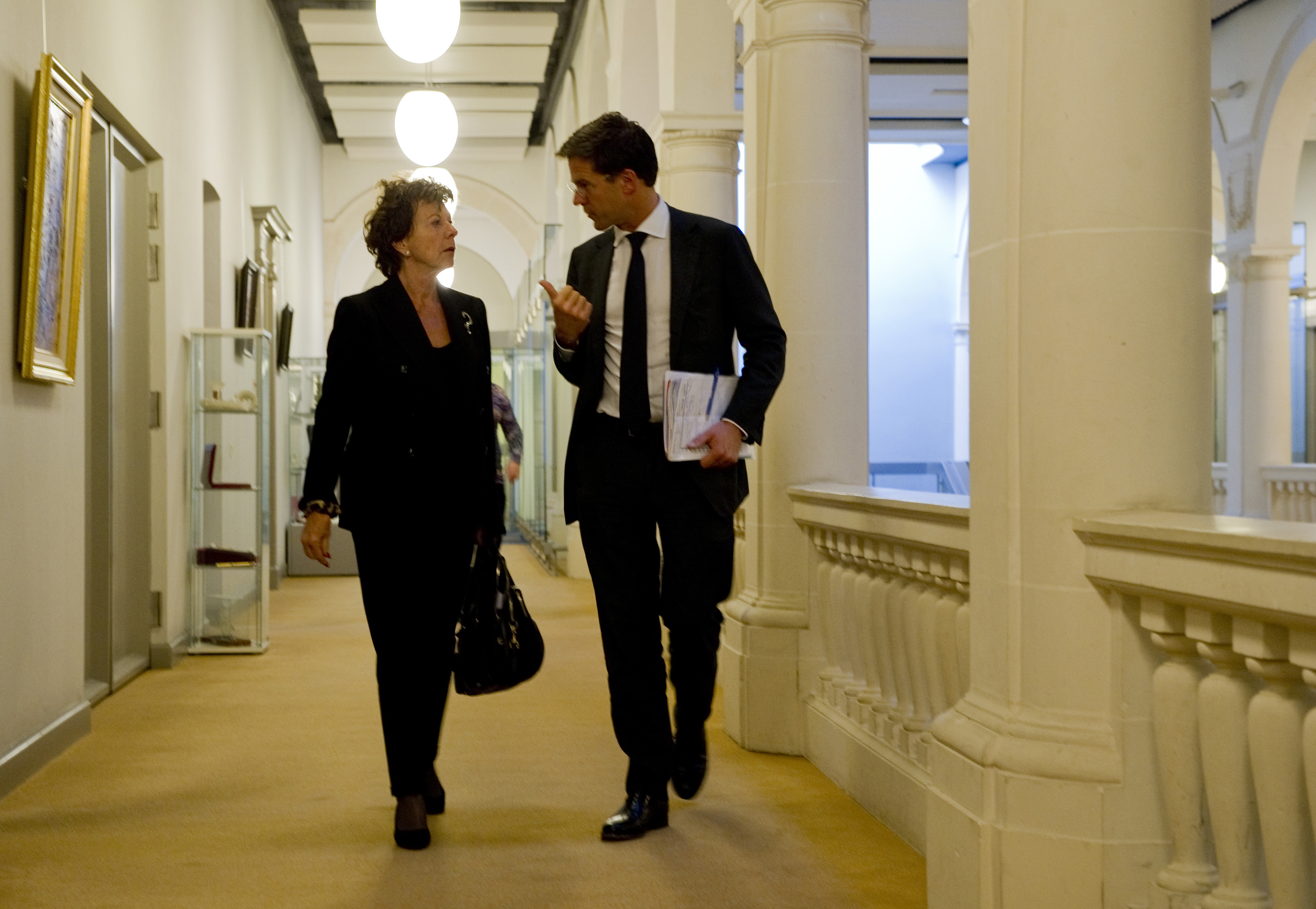
European Commissioner Neelie Kroes and Prime Minister Mark Rutte at the Ministry of General Affairs on 28 October 2011.

== Local and national politics ==
Neelie Kroes was first elected member of the Rotterdam city council for the VVD in 1970.

In 1971, she was elected to the House of Representatives, forcing her to stop her fellowship. In parliament, she became spokesperson for education. She remained a member of parliament until 1977, when she became State Secretary for Transport, Public Works and Water Management in the First Van Agt Cabinet, responsible for Postal and Telephone Services and Transport. In 1981, she briefly returned to the House of Representatives, while her party, VVD, was in the opposition. In 1982 she returned to office in the First and Second Lubbers Cabinets, now as the Minister of Transport, Public Works and Water Management, a post that she held until 1989. As a minister she was responsible for the privatisation of the Postgiro (Postbank, initially a part of the PTT), the Post and Telephone Services, the Harbour Pilotage services, as well as the commissioning of the Betuwe Railway.

Kroes refused to become Minister of Defence in 1988.

During her tenure as minister, she was involved in the so-called TCR affair, about the illegal sale of warships. She had also a business relationship with a tank cleaning company (TCR), which illegally received governmental subsidies.

== After National Politics ==
After her ministerial career, Kroes spent two years working on two projects as an advisor to Karel van Miert, at that time European Commissioner for Transport. She also became a member of the Rotterdam Chamber of Commerce, furthermore she served as a board member for Ballast Nedam (shipping), ABP-PGGM Capital Holdings N.V. (a joint subsidiary of the pension funds ABP and PGGM), NIB (an investment bank), McDonald's Netherlands, Nedlloyd, and Nederlandse Spoorwegen (the Dutch railroad company).

In 1991, Kroes became chairperson of Nyenrode University, a private business school. During this period Kroes also was a member of the Advisory Board of the Prof.Mr. B.M. Teldersstichting, the scientific bureau of VVD.

According to her husband, Bram Peper, from 1993 to 2001, Kroes relied on astrologers and clairvoyants for personal and business advice. Until 2004 Kroes maintained an office in the castle of Jan-Dirk Paarlberg, a real estate mogul who was convicted to four and a half years in prison for money-laundering and extortion. One of the astrologers advising Kroes during that time was Lenie Drent, who had been providing business advice to Paarlberg for decades.

Kroes has held and still holds many side offices, mainly in cultural and social organisations. She is chairperson of Poets of all Nations, the Delta Psychiatric Hospital and of the board of the Rembrandt House Museum. Also, she was a member of several boards of commissioners, for instance at Nedlloyd (a shipping company) and Lucent Technologies (an information and communication technologies company).

== European Commission ==
=== Commissioner for Competition ===
In 2004, Kroes was appointed the European Commissioner for Competition. At the time, her nomination was heavily criticised because of her ties to big business and alleged involvement in shady arms deals. Kroes has tried to uphold her integrity; whenever she has to deal with issues concerning competition in branches of industry in which she used to be active as a board member, Commissioner McCreevy takes over her responsibilities.

As chairperson of Nyenrode Business University, Kroes awarded an honorary doctorate to Microsoft founder Bill Gates in 1996. As a European Commissioner for Competition one of her first tasks in 2004 was to oversee the sanctions against Microsoft by the European Commission, known as the European Union Microsoft competition case. This case resulted in the requirement to release documents to aid commercial interoperability and included a €497 million fine for Microsoft.

Kroes attended conferences organized by the Bilderberg Group every year between 2005 and 2012.

In 2009, she was transferred to another European Commissioner post, namely ICT and Telecom. She was also appointed as one of the vice-presidents of the European Commission.

=== Commissioner for Digital Agenda ===
In 2010, she became European Commissioner for Digital Agenda in the second Barroso Commission. The Digital Agenda for Europe was proposed by the European Commission on 19 May 2010.

The Digital Agenda for Europe is supported by the EU Digital Competitiveness Report launched also on 19 May 2010. She is a proponent of Free and Open Source Software.

Since 2010, she has served as a Commissioner for the Broadband Commission for Digital Development which leverages broadband technologies as a key enabler for social and economic development.

In 2010, it was suggested that she would become prime-minister in the Netherlands, when Mark Rutte would stay in parliament due to difficulties in the formations in the new Cabinet. However, eventually Rutte became prime-minister.

In December 2011, Kroes invited Karl-Theodor zu Guttenberg who had resigned as German Minister of Defence in March 2011, due to plagiarism charges – as advisor to the European Commission as part of its No Disconnect Strategy designed to promote Internet freedom.

In November 2012, Kroes made international news when she said her advisers at the Internet Governance Forum in Baku, Azerbaijan had been the victims of computer hacking.

== Later career ==
Kroes is currently leading StartupDelta, a public-private initiative to help promote the Netherlands as a destination for startup companies. For the 2019 European elections, she was brought into the European election campaign by Guy Verhofstadt's Open Flemish Liberals and Democrats (Open VLD) in Belgium.

In addition, Kroes has been holding a variety of paid and unpaid positions.

=== Corporate boards ===
- Planet Labs, Member of the European Advisory Board (since 2026)
- Uber, Member of the Public Policy Advisory Board (since 2016)
- Salesforce, Non-Executive Board Board of Directors (since 2016)

=== Non-profit organizations ===
- Open Data Institute, Non-Executive Member of the Board (since 2015)

== Controversy ==
At the end of the 1980s, intensive research into environmental crime among chemical waste processing companies ended in a fiasco. As Minister of Transport, Public Works and Water Management, Kroes had conceived the plan to provide subsidies to the companies TCA and TCR (Tanker Cleaning Amsterdam and Rotterdam, respectively). Even though she was made aware of the company's criminal activities, including mixing chemical waste into fuel oil, she pushed through with the subsidies. The resulting TCR affair sparked a parliamentary inquiry in 1997. Kroes was accused by the investigative committee that she had helped a rogue company with a government subsidy into the saddle, which made the environmental crimes possible.

In the mid-1990s, Kroes was involved in the frigate affair: the failed purchase of six Dutch frigates (amounting to 1.2 billion euros) by the United Arab Emirates. As chairman of a consortium of Holland Signaal, Ballast Nedam and Koninklijke Schelde (supported by the navy, the Port of Rotterdam Authority and the Dutch Ministry of Economic Affairs), Kroes attempted to exchange the frigates for oil supplies. When it turned out that she was also using her chairmanship to serve the business interests of a personal friend, the businessman Joop van Caldenborgh, she was removed from her position by the government. It was only in 2011 that it became known that she had also put Prince Bernhard forward as a lobbyist in this deal, in violation of the agreements that Bernhard had made with the Den Uyl cabinet after the Lockheed affair. The frigate affair brought Kroes into contact with Jordanian investor Amin Badr-El-Din, with whom she would run the company Mint Holdings some years later, which was planning to take over part of Enron.

In 2016, leaks to the International Consortium of Investigative Journalists (who also oversaw the Panama Papers and Paradise Papers leaks) revealed that from 2001 to 2009 Kroes was the director of Mint Holdings, a company registered in the Bahamas. As part of the EU rules, a commissioner is obliged to declare previous and current economic interests, but she did not declare her directorship of the Bahamas company. Further, EU commissioners are not allowed to hold outside directorships while in office (Kroes was in office 2004–2014). According to her lawyer, Kroes acknowledged the situation, calling it an "oversight", and declared that she would take full responsibility.

The “Uber files”, leaked documents in 2022, revealed the active and unusual efforts of Uber in lobbying regulators. They showed that Kroes prepared her appointment at the company when she was still in office. She did not disclose the numerous appointments she had with firm executives when she was European Commissioner for Competition or Commissioner for the Digital Agenda (a position she held until November 2014). After resigning from the European Commission, she actively helped Uber bend regulations by opening her contacts to the company, including then-Netherlands Prime Minister Mark Rutte, breaking her 18-months duty of réserve that ex-commissioners must apply. She joined Uber's Public Affairs team in 2016.

== Personal life ==
Kroes was married to social democratic minister and mayor Bram Peper. She is a confidant of Ayaan Hirsi Ali, known for her criticism of Islam and having a fatwa issued, and persuaded her to switch allegiance from the social democratic PvdA to the VVD.

== Recognition ==
=== Awards ===
Kroes was International Road Federation Man of the Year of 1993.

Kroes made the Forbes' The World's 100 Most Powerful Women list multiple times: as number 53 in 2009, 47 in 2008, 59 in 2007.

=== Decorations ===
Honours
Ribbon bar	Honour	Country	Date	Comment
	Knight of the Order of the Netherlands Lion	Netherlands	26 October 1981	
	Grand Cross of the Order of the Crown	Belgium	1 May 2008	
	Knight Grand Cross of the Order of Orange-Nassau	Netherlands	19 November 2015	Elevated from Grand Officer (20 November 1989)

== Honorary degrees ==
Honorary degrees
University	Field	Country	Date	Comment
University of Hull	Economics	England	1989	
Open University	Political science	Netherlands	26 September 2014	
University of Bath	Doctor of Laws	England	June 2016	

Political offices
Preceded by Michel van Hulten	State Secretary for Transport and Water Management; 1977–1981	Succeeded by Jaap van der Doef
Preceded by Henk Zeevalking	Minister of Transport and Water Management; 1982–1989	Succeeded by Hanja Maij-Weggen
Preceded by Frits Bolkestein	European Commissioner from the Netherlands; 2004–2014	Succeeded by Frans Timmermans
Preceded by Mario Monti	European Commissioner for Competition; 2004–2010	Succeeded by Joaquín Almunia
Preceded by Viviane Reding as European Commissioner for Information Society and Media	European Commissioner for Digital Agenda; 2010–2014	Succeeded by Günther Oettinger as European Commissioner for Digital Economy and Society
Preceded by Viviane Reding as European Commissioner for Information Society and Media	European Commissioner for Digital Agenda; 2010–2014	Succeeded by Andrus Ansip as European Commissioner for Digital Single Market
Business positions
Preceded by Barend Biesheuvel	Chairwoman of the Supervisory board of the NIBC Bank; 1991–2004	Unknown
Non-profit organization positions
Unknown	Chairwoman of the Supervisory board of the Rembrandt House Museum; 2000–present	Incumbent
Academic offices
Unknown	Rector Magnificus of the Nyenrode Business University; 1991–2000	Succeeded by Karel Van Miert
