= Robin Linschoten =

Dutch politician (born 1956)

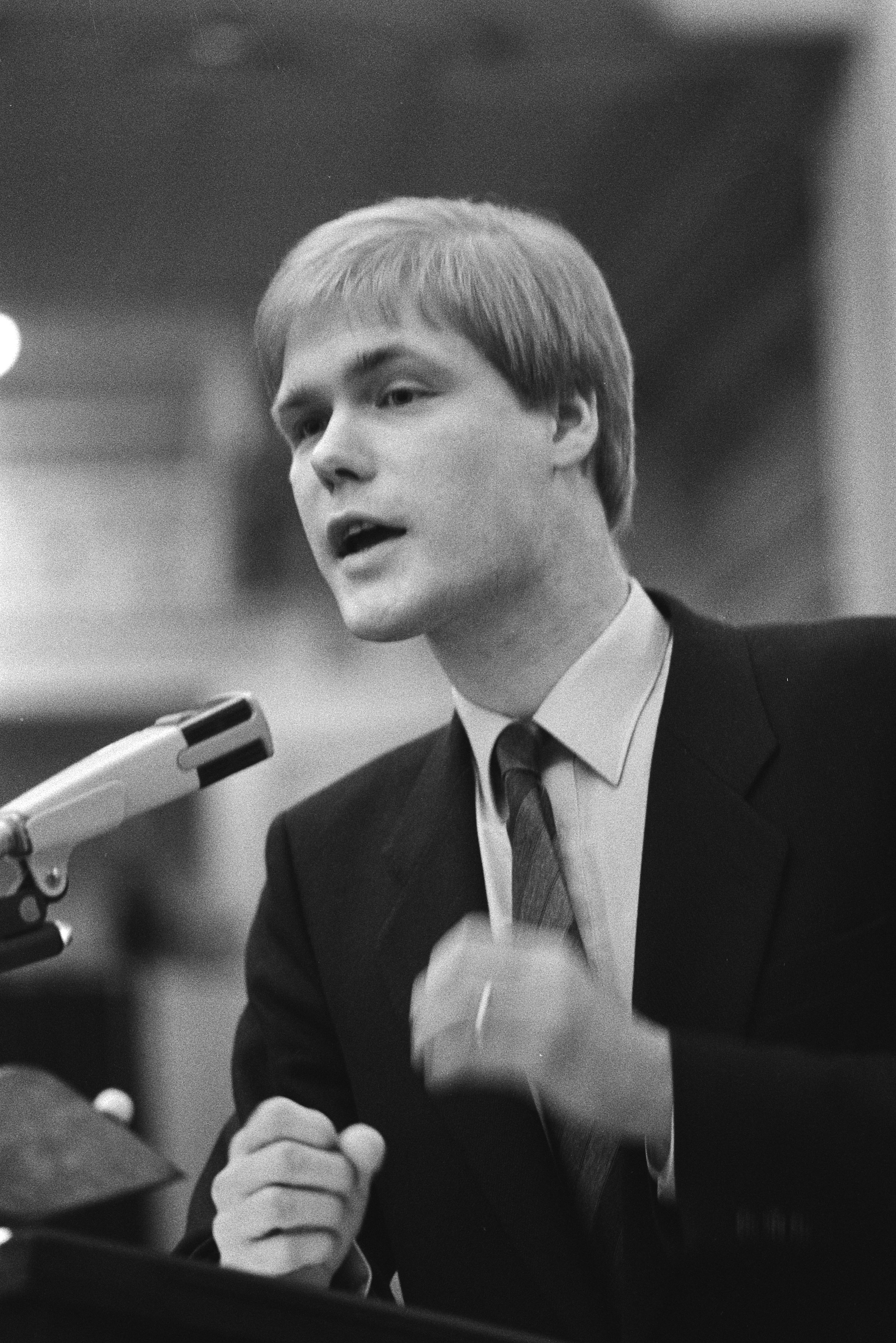
- Linschoten in 1983

State Secretary for Social Affairs and Employment
- In office 22 August 1994 – 28 June 1996
- Minister: Ad Melkert
- Cabinet: Kok I
- Preceded by: Jacques Wallage
- Succeeded by: Frank de Grave

Member of the House of Representatives
- In office 16 September 1982 – 22 August 1994

Personal details
- Born: Robin Lorenz Oscar Linschoten; 17 October 1956 (age 69) Ugchelen, Netherlands
- Party: People's Party for Freedom and Democracy

Robin Lorenz Oscar Linschoten (Dutch: [ˈrɔbɪn ˈlɪnsxoːtə(n)]; born 17 October 1956) is a Dutch politician of the conservative-liberal People's Party for Freedom and Democracy (VVD).

== Early life and career ==
Born in Ugchelen, he started working as a policy officer for the VVD's parliamentary group before finishing his law studies at Vrije Universiteit Amsterdam. He was elected to the House of Representatives in September 1982 as the youngest member of his term. He continued in his position until he joined the first Kok cabinet on 22 August 1994 as State Secretary for Social Affairs and Employment. He resigned on 28 June 1996 because of administrative issues within the Board of Supervision of Social Insurances and his delaying of the submission of a report from the body to the House.

He later served on the management team of insurance company Interpolis, as chairman of the Advisory Board on Administrative Burdens, and on the board of directors of DSB Bank, until its 2009 bankruptcy. He was also a lobbyist for gambling companies. In July 2022, the Supreme Court of the Netherlands upheld Linschoten's conviction for tax evasion between 2010 and 2012, sentencing him to 100 hours of community service. Linschoten blamed his accountant for the error.

Political offices
Preceded by Jacques Wallage	State Secretary for Social Affairs and Employment; 1994–1996	Succeeded by Frank de Grave
