= Schelto Patijn =

Dutch politician (1936–2007)

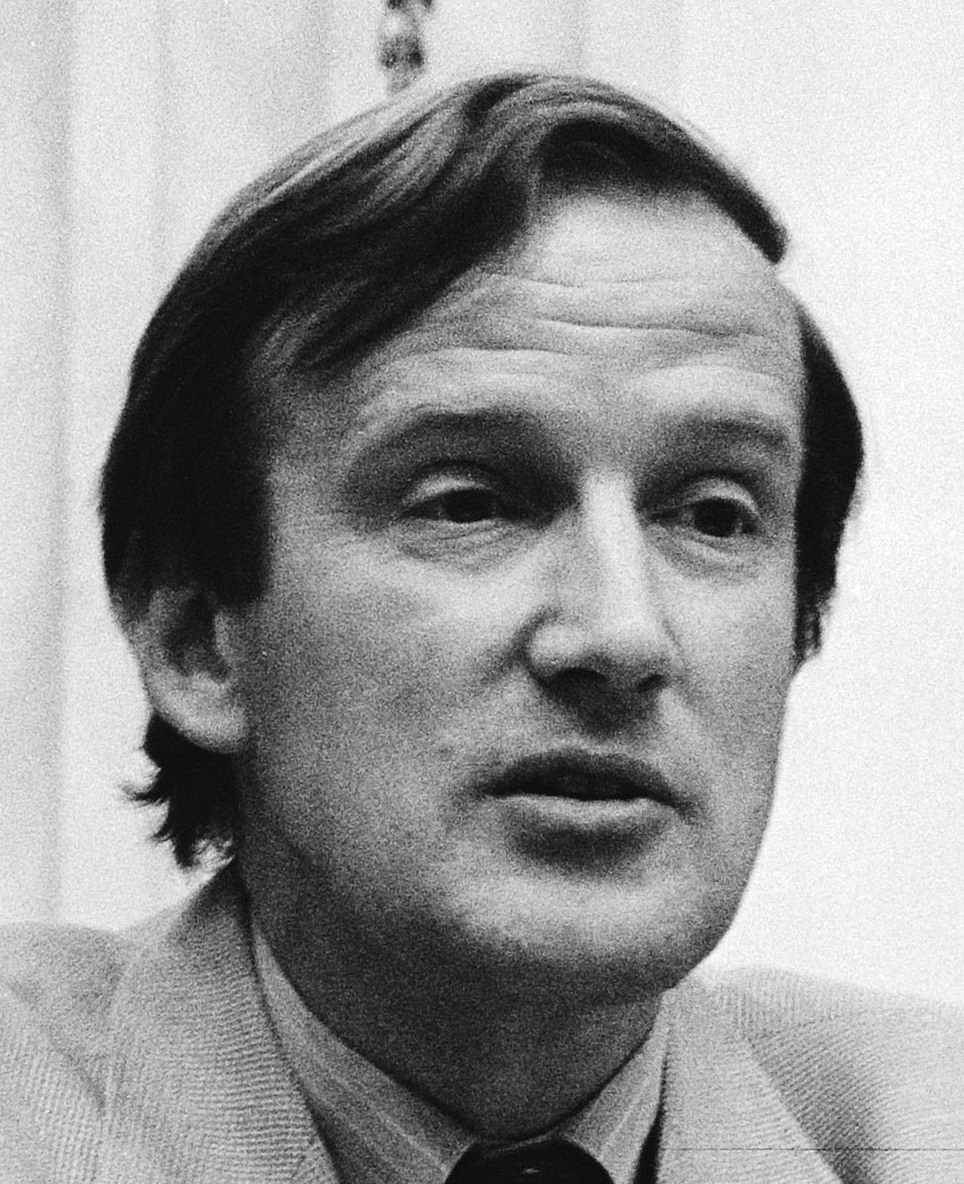
- Schelto Patijn in 1980

Mayor of Amsterdam
- In office 1 June 1994 – 1 January 2001
- Preceded by: Frank de Grave (Acting)
- Succeeded by: Guusje ter Horst (Ad interim)

Queen's Commissioner of South Holland
- In office 16 June 1984 – 1 June 1994
- Monarch: Beatrix
- Preceded by: Maarten Vrolijk
- Succeeded by: Joan Leemhuis-Stout

Member of the European Parliament
- In office 3 July 1973 – 16 July 1979
- Parliamentary group: Socialist Group
- Constituency: Netherlands

Member of the House of Representatives
- In office 28 May 1973 – 16 June 1984
- Parliamentary group: Labour Party

Personal details
- Born: Schelto Patijn; 13 August 1936 The Hague, Netherlands
- Died: 15 July 2007 (aged 70) Amsterdam, Netherlands
- Cause of death: Kidney cancer
- Party: Labour Party
- Spouse: Elisabeth Stroink (m. 1961)
- Children: 3 children (including Mariëtte Patijn)
- Parent: Connie Patijn (1908–2007) (father)
- Relatives: Jack Patijn (brother); Michiel Patijn (brother)
- Education: Utrecht University (Bachelor of Laws, Master of Laws, Doctor of Philosophy)
- Occupation: Politician · Civil servant · Jurist · Researcher · Nonprofit director

Military service
- Allegiance: Netherlands
- Branch/service: Royal Marechaussee
- Years of service: 1959–1962 (Conscription)
- Rank: Lieutenant

Schelto Patijn [ˈsxɛɫtoː pɑˈtɛin] (13 August 1936 – 15 July 2007) was a Dutch politician of the Labour Party (PvdA) and jurist. After serving as an elected member of the Dutch and subsequently European Parliament, he served as Queen's Commissioner in the Province of South Holland from 16 June 1984 until 1 June 1994 when he stepped down to become Mayor of Amsterdam, he served from 1 June 1994 until 1 January 2001.

== Biography ==
=== Early life ===
Patijn was the second son of Conny Patijn, a Member of the House of Representatives, from 1956 until 1967, and Sara van Citters. He was a descendant of Michiel de Ruyter, he was named after the father of his mother, politician Schelto van Citters.

Patijn went to school at the liberal Vrijzinnig-Christelijk Lyceum in The Hague from 1948 to 1954. After that he studied law at the Utrecht University and became a member of the Utrechtsch Students Corps. Patijn graduated in 1959. He fulfilled his military duty in which he rose to the rank of reserve-first lieutenant of the royal military police. In 1961–1962 he followed a post-academic study in Washington D.C. Hereafter he was a policy employee at the European Integration Department of the Ministry of Foreign Affairs, up to 1967 when he changed to the Europe institute of the University of Leiden. Initially he worked there as a scientific employee, but in 1971, he became director of the institute.

Patijn received a doctorate degree in September 1973 from the Utrecht University on: 'the European Parliament, the fight for its powers'.

=== Politics ===
In 1973, his political career also started. Patijn was a Member of the House of Representatives from 28 May 1973 until 16 June 1984 and from 3 July 1973 until 16 July 1979 a Member of the European Parliament. In Brussels he worked as rapporteur on direct elections.

In the House of Representatives he was an advocate for the right to vote in the European Parliament (originally consisting of appointed members). From December 1978 to August 1979 Patijn was President of a special commission to examine who had knowledge of the war past of Willem Aantjes, how they had come to this knowledge and if someone had been using it. Patijn voted in 1980 for a Dutch boycott of the Olympic Games in Moscow. Early 1982 he was candidate Mayor of Rotterdam, but minister Ed van Thijn preferred the 42-year-old Bram Peper. At the constitutional revision of 1983 Patijn played an important role.

On 16 June 1984, Patijn became commissioner of the queen in the province South Holland. In that function he signed a decision of the Provincial Council of South Holland on 30 August 1988, that later lead to a financial scandal (in 1999).

By 1 June 1994, Patijn became Mayor of Amsterdam. He succeeded Ed van Thijn, who in January of that year had left to succeed the deceased Ien Dales as minister of home affairs in the Cabinet Lubbers III. Patijn was a remarkable choice, because a tradition appeared to be emerging to appoint a Jewish mayor in the municipality of Amsterdam. He was to be the commissioner of the queen of the still to be formed town province of Amsterdam. When however the town province was voted down by referendum, one mayor job only remained for Patijn; actually a degradation for a commissioner of the queen.

As Mayor, Patijn initially wanted to halve the number of coffee shops in the capital. He got within some years a pet name (Uncle shrill) and a fan club. Nevertheless he was much criticised for restricting the free market on Queen's Day.

Patijn was succeeded on 1 January 2001 by Job Cohen. After stepping down as mayor he continued live in Amsterdam, even though it was his intention to return to The Hague.

=== Trivia ===
In February 2001 Patijn was asked to be vice-chairman of the Labour Party, but he withdrew for health reasons. In 2004, Patijn was the President of a Labour Party-project group which wrote a report regarding integration and immigration.

Patijn married Elisabeth Stroink on 12 July 1961. The couple had three children. After a long spell with health problems, Schelto Patijn died in the summer of 2007. He was 70. After a private commemoration in the Westerkerk, Patijn was buried in the Amsterdam cemetery Zorgvlied.

His father outlived him by a few months, until his own death on 7 September 2007 at the age of 98.

== Decorations ==
Honours
Ribbon bar	Honour	Country	Date	Comment
	Knight of the Order of the Netherlands Lion	Netherlands	1987	
	Commander of the Order of Orange-Nassau	Netherlands	1994	

Political offices
Preceded by Maarten Vrolijk	Queen's Commissioner of South Holland; 1984–1994	Succeeded by Joan Leemhuis-Stout
Preceded by Frank de Grave; Acting	Mayor of Amsterdam; 1994–2001	Succeeded by Guusje ter Horst; Ad interim
