= Jo Schouwenaar-Franssen =

Dutch politician (1909–1995)

Her Excellency Jo Schouwenaar-Franssen
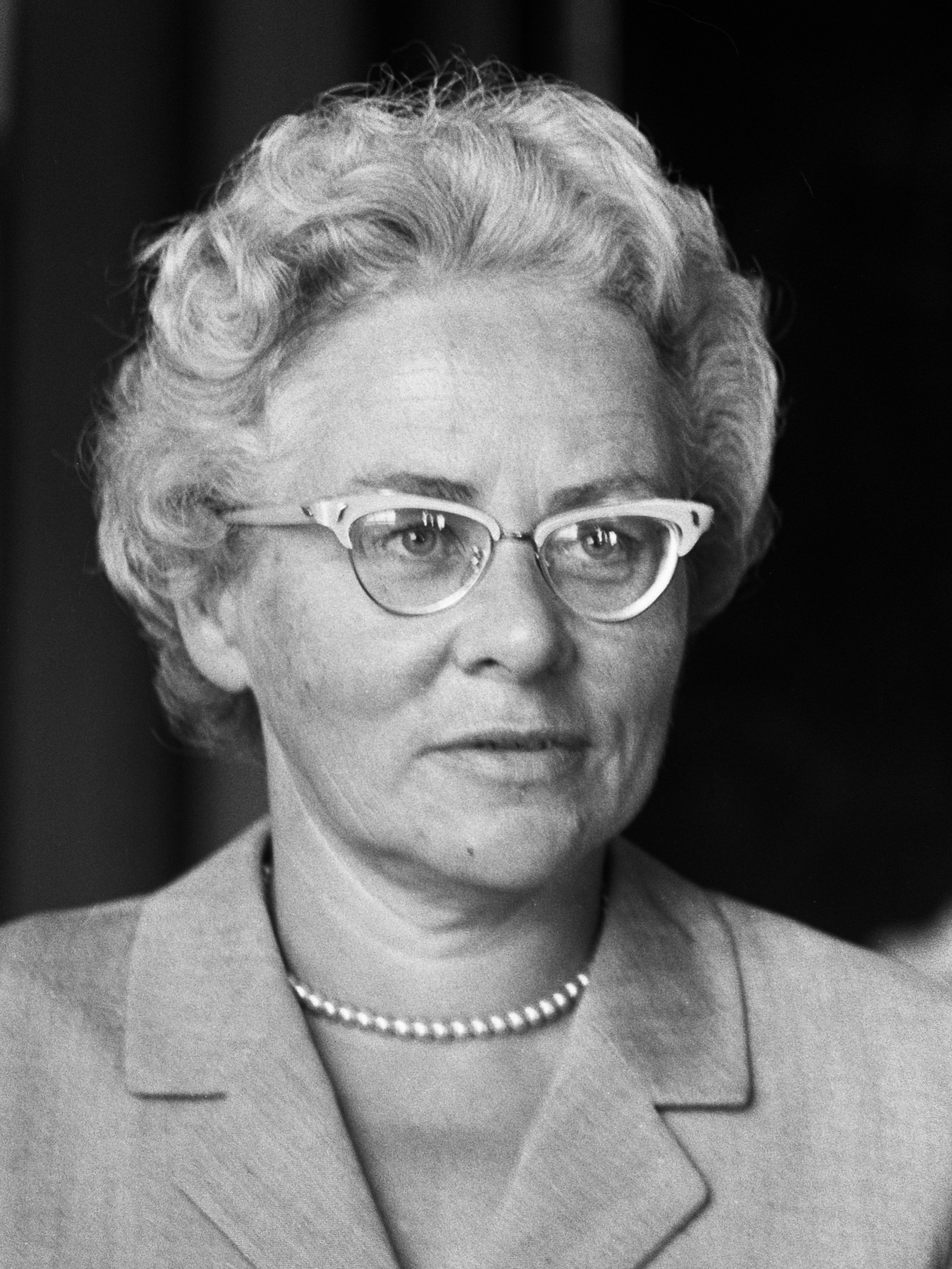
- Jo Schouwenaar-Franssen in 1963

Minister of Social Work
- In office 24 July 1963 – 14 April 1965
- Prime Minister: Victor Marijnen
- Preceded by: Marga Klompé
- Succeeded by: Maarten Vrolijk as Minister of Culture, Recreation and Social Work

Member of the European Parliament
- In office 16 January 1961 – 24 July 1963
- Parliamentary group: Group of Liberals and Allies
- Constituency: Netherlands

Member of the Senate
- In office 20 September 1966 – 10 May 1971
- In office 6 November 1956 – 24 July 1963
- Parliamentary group: People's Party for Freedom and Democracy

Personal details
- Born: Johanna Frederika Franssen; 3 May 1909 Rotterdam, Netherlands
- Died: 24 December 1995 (aged 86) Bilthoven, Netherlands
- Party: People's Party for Freedom and Democracy (from 1948)
- Other political affiliations: Freedom Party (1946–1948); Liberal State Party (1945–1946)
- Spouse: Arie Jan Schouwenaar (m. 1945; died 1962)
- Children: 2 sons and 1 daughter
- Education: Leiden University (Bachelor of Letters, Master of Letters) University of Perugia (Bachelor of Education, Master of Education)
- Occupation: Politician · Teacher · Nonprofit director · Activist · Lobbyist

Johanna Frederika "Jo" Schouwenaar-Franssen (3 May 1909 – 24 December 1995) was a Dutch politician of the People's Party for Freedom and Democracy (VVD).

== Decorations ==
Honours
| Ribbon bar | Honour | Country | Date | Comment |
| | Grand Officer of the Order of Orange-Nassau | Netherlands | 20 April 1965 | |
| | Commander of the Order of the Netherlands Lion | Netherlands | 10 May 1971 | Elevated from Knight (30 April 1968) |

Political offices
| Preceded by Marga Klompé | Minister of Social Work; 1963–1965 | Succeeded by Maarten Vrolijk as Minister of Culture, Recreation and Social Work |
