= Anneke van Dok-van Weele =

Dutch politician (1934–2025)

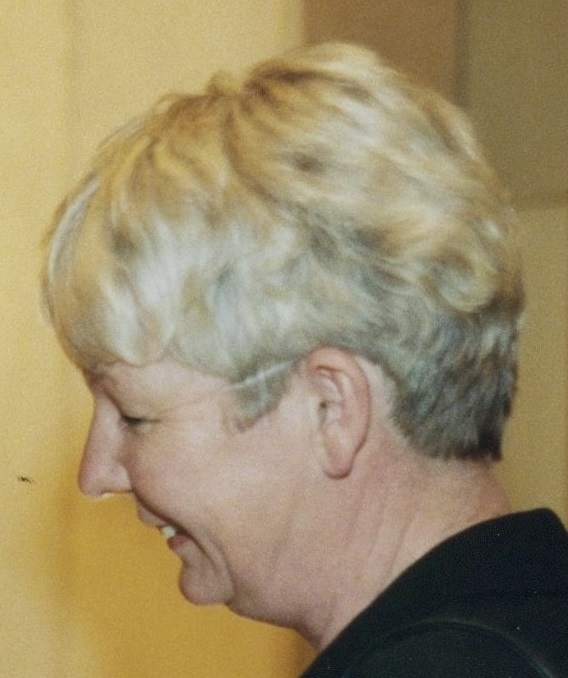
- Van Dok-van Weele in 1998

Mayor of Niedorp
- In office 5 October 2009 – 1 January 2012; Acting
- Preceded by: Franc Weerwind
- Succeeded by: Abolished; Theo van Eijk as Mayor of Hollands Kroon

Mayor of Vlissingen
- In office 1 June 1999 – 1 January 2008
- Preceded by: Jaap van der Doef
- Succeeded by: Wim Dijkstra

Member of the House of Representatives
- In office 26 May 1998 – 1 June 1999
- Parliamentary group: Labour Party

State Secretary for Economic Affairs
- In office 22 August 1994 – 3 August 1998
- Prime Minister: Wim Kok
- Preceded by: Yvonne van Rooy
- Succeeded by: Gerrit Ybema

Mayor of Velsen
- In office 1 February 1990 – 22 August 1994
- Preceded by: Dick van den Noort
- Succeeded by: Fons Hertog

Mayor of Diemen
- In office 1 July 1984 – 1 February 1990
- Preceded by: Hans Strumphler Tideman
- Succeeded by: Bob de Hon

Personal details
- Born: Anneke van Weele; 24 October 1947 (age 78) Zaandam, Netherlands
- Party: Labour Party (from 1969)
- Occupation: Politician; Journalist; Author; Nonprofit director

Anneke van Dok-van Weele (born 24 October 1947) is a Dutch former politician.
