= Anna de Waal =

Dutch politician (1906–1981)

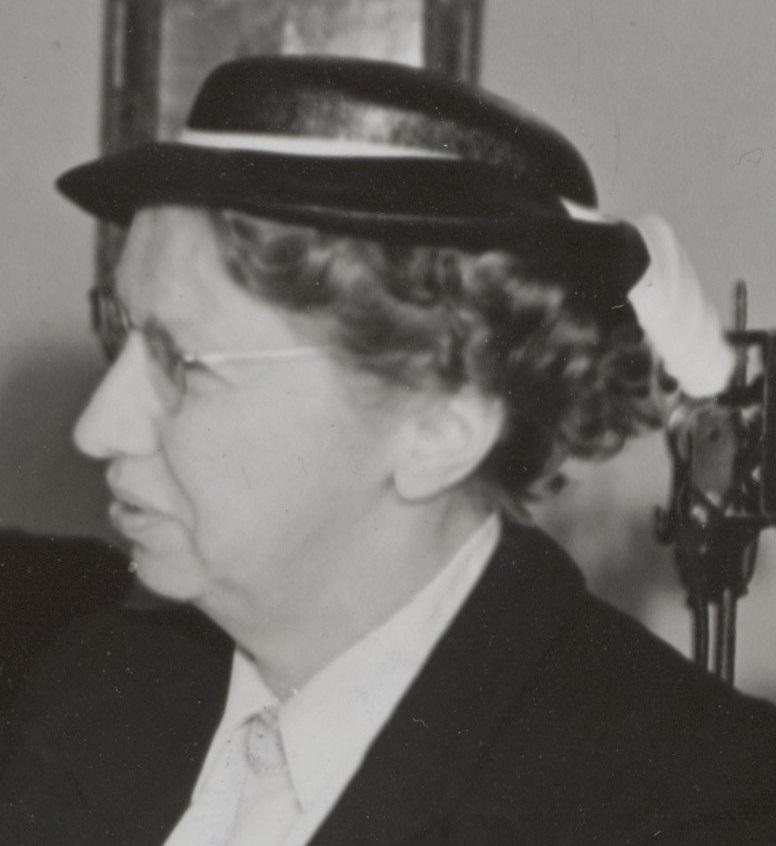
- De Waal in 1954

State Secretary for Education, Arts and Sciences
- In office 2 February 1953 – 16 March 1957 Serving with René Höppener (1956–1957)
- Prime Minister: Willem Drees
- Preceded by: Jo Cals
- Succeeded by: René Höppener

Member of the House of Representatives
- In office 15 July 1952 – 2 February 1953
- Parliamentary group: Catholic People's Party

Personal details
- Born: Leendert Antonie Donker; 25 November 1906 Culemborg, Netherlands
- Died: 21 March 1981 (aged 74) Arnhem, Netherlands
- Party: Catholic People's Party (1946–1962)
- Education: Utrecht University (Bachelor of Social Science, Master of Social Science, Doctor of Philosophy)
- Occupation: Politician; Social geographer; Researcher; Teacher; Nonprofit director; Lobbyist; Activist

Anna de Waal (25 November 1906 – 21 March 1981), was a Dutch politician (Catholic party). She was state secretary of education in 1953–1957. De Waal was the first female government secretary or minister in the Netherlands.
