= Dutch Healthcare Authority =

Dutch healthcare regulating body

The Dutch Healthcare Authority (Nederlandse Zorgautoriteit) is an agency of the Dutch Ministry of Health, Welfare and Sport, established by the Healthcare Market Regulation Act 2006. It is based in Utrecht and has more than 400 employees.

It monitors the quality, accessibility and affordability, regulates the market in healthcare and advises the ministry.

It issued a warning to Zilveren Kruis, a Dutch health insurance company, in November 2018 about changes to their policies introduced retrospectively in January 2018.

In October 2018 it produced a report advising the ministry to move towards a contract which rewards outcomes that patients consider important, and which encourages more integrated care and aligns the interests of the hospital management with independent medical specialists.
