= 1986 Dutch cabinet formation =

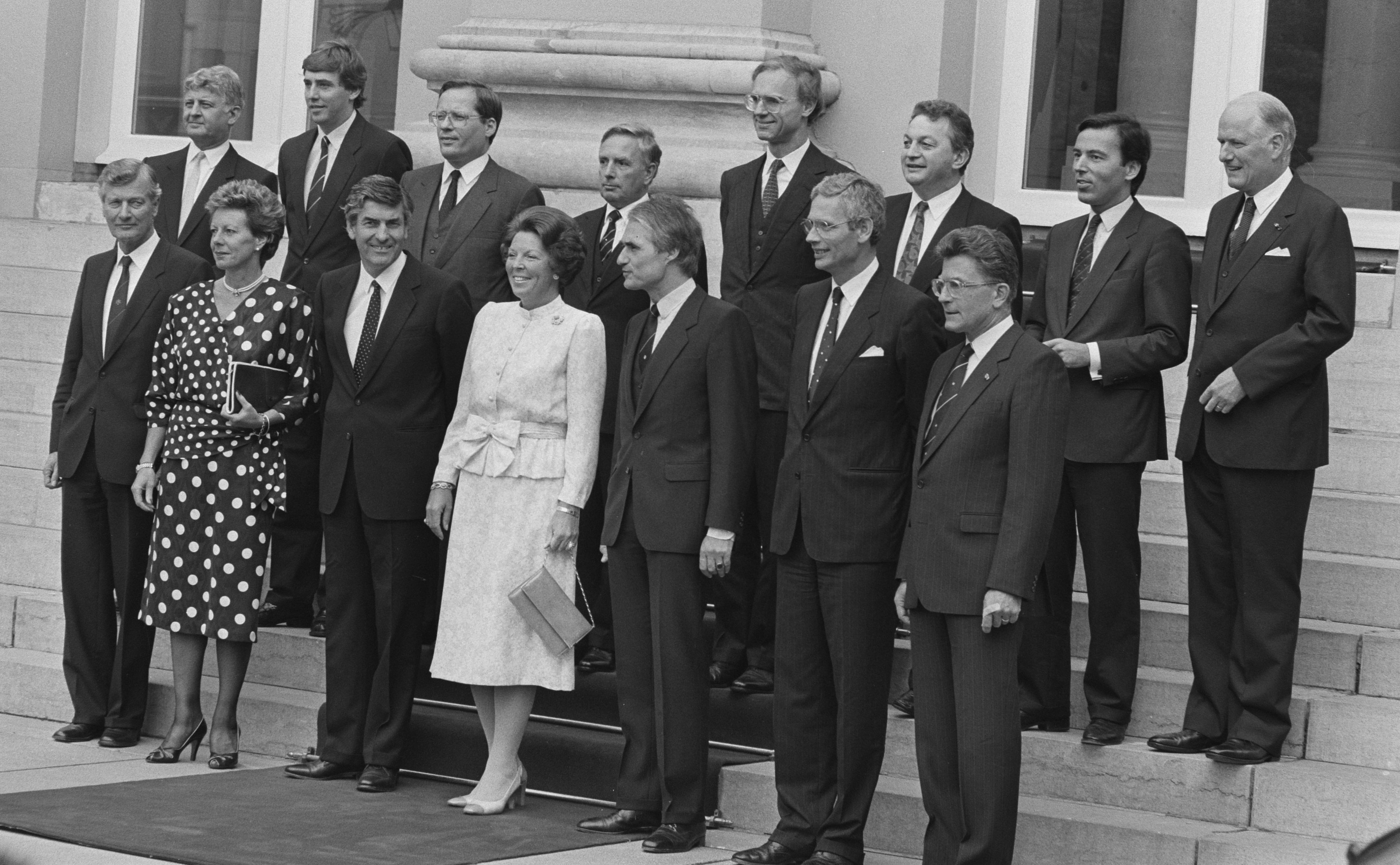
Queen Beatrix with the ministers of the Second Lubbers cabinet.

The 1986 Dutch cabinet formation followed the general election of 21 May 1986. The formation process lasted 54 days and resulted in the installation of the Second Lubbers cabinet.

== Background ==
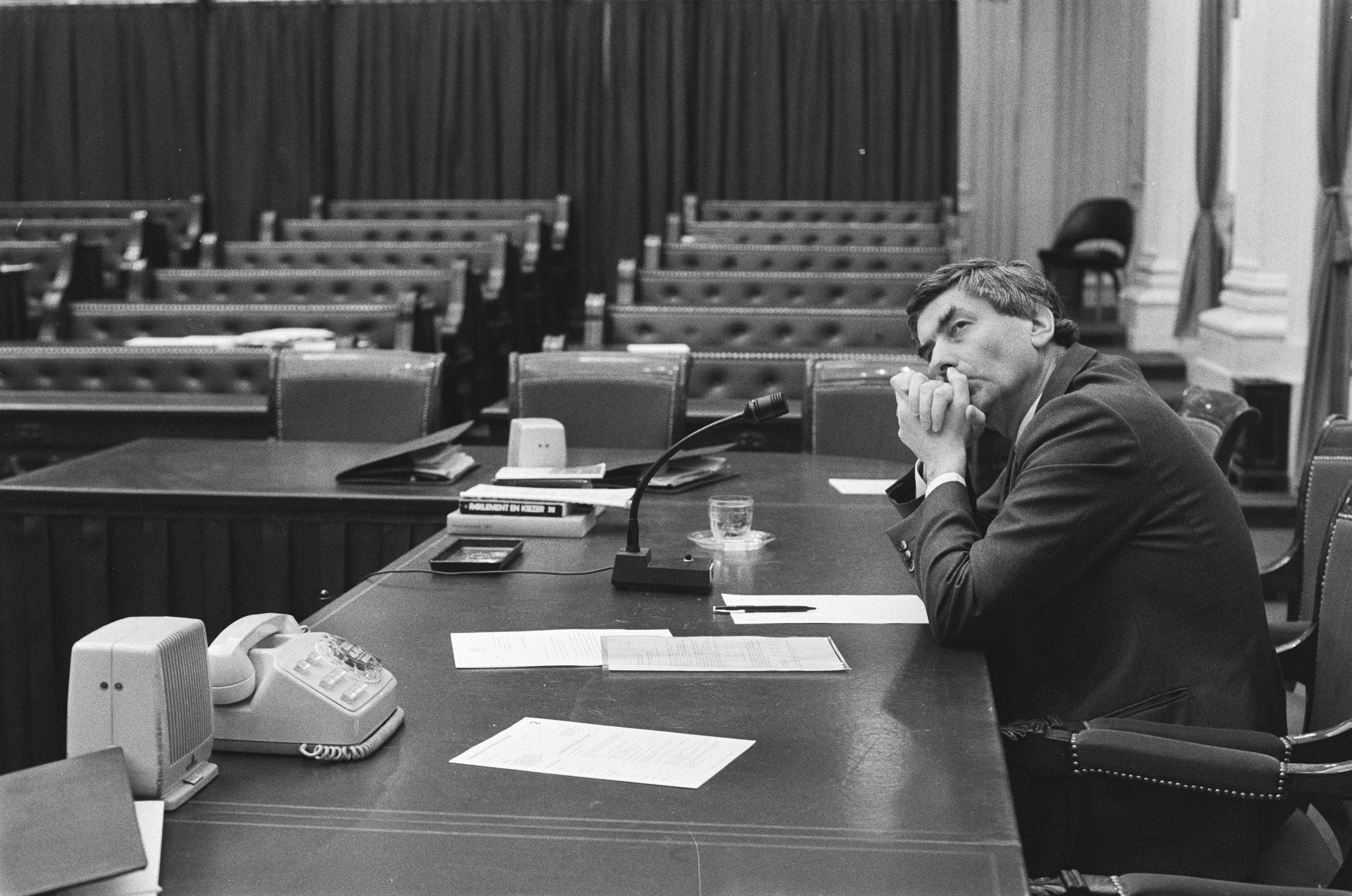
Campaign slogan: "Laat Lubbers zijn karwei afmaken" ("Let Lubbers finish the job").

In the election, the Christian Democratic Appeal (CDA), led by Prime Minister Ruud Lubbers, achieved a major victory with the campaign slogan "Laat Lubbers z'n karwei afmaken" ("Let Lubbers finish the job"). The party increased its representation from 45 to 54 seats in the House of Representatives.

Coalition partner People's Party for Freedom and Democracy (VVD), campaigning under the slogan "Gewoon jezelf kunnen zijn" ("Just being yourself"), lost nine seats. Among the opposition parties, the Labour Party (PvdA) and Democrats 66 (D66) both made gains. With 52 seats, the PvdA achieved the second-best electoral result in its history, though this did not translate into a realistic prospect of entering government, a situation later described as a "victorious defeat". D66 gained three seats.

As in the 1977 election, the PvdA's gains came largely at the expense of smaller left-wing parties. The Communist Party of the Netherlands (CPN) and the Evangelical People's Party (EVP) lost all parliamentary representation, while the Pacifist Socialist Party (PSP) lost two seats. The Reformed Political Federation (RPF) also lost a seat, and Hans Janmaat failed to return to parliament.

Since both the CDA and VVD had campaigned on continuing their coalition and together retained a comfortable parliamentary majority, the continuation of the incumbent coalition was widely expected.

== Informateur Jan de Koning ==
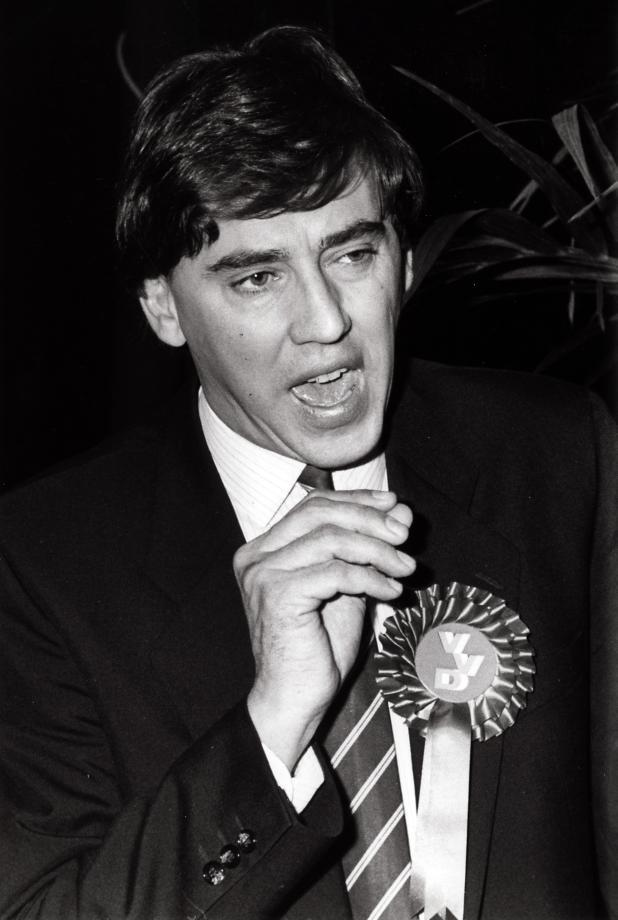
Ed Nijpels

Queen Beatrix appointed outgoing Minister of Social Affairs Jan de Koning as informateur. Under his supervision, negotiators Ruud Lubbers and VVD leader Ed Nijpels quickly reached agreement on the outlines of a coalition accord.

The coalition agreement focused primarily on socio-economic issues, including reducing unemployment and continuing the restructuring of public finances.

== Formateur Lubbers ==
After approximately six weeks of negotiations, the coalition parties finalized their agreement. Lubbers was then appointed formateur and required four additional days to assemble the cabinet.

The Second Lubbers cabinet was sworn in on 14 July 1986.

== Aftermath ==
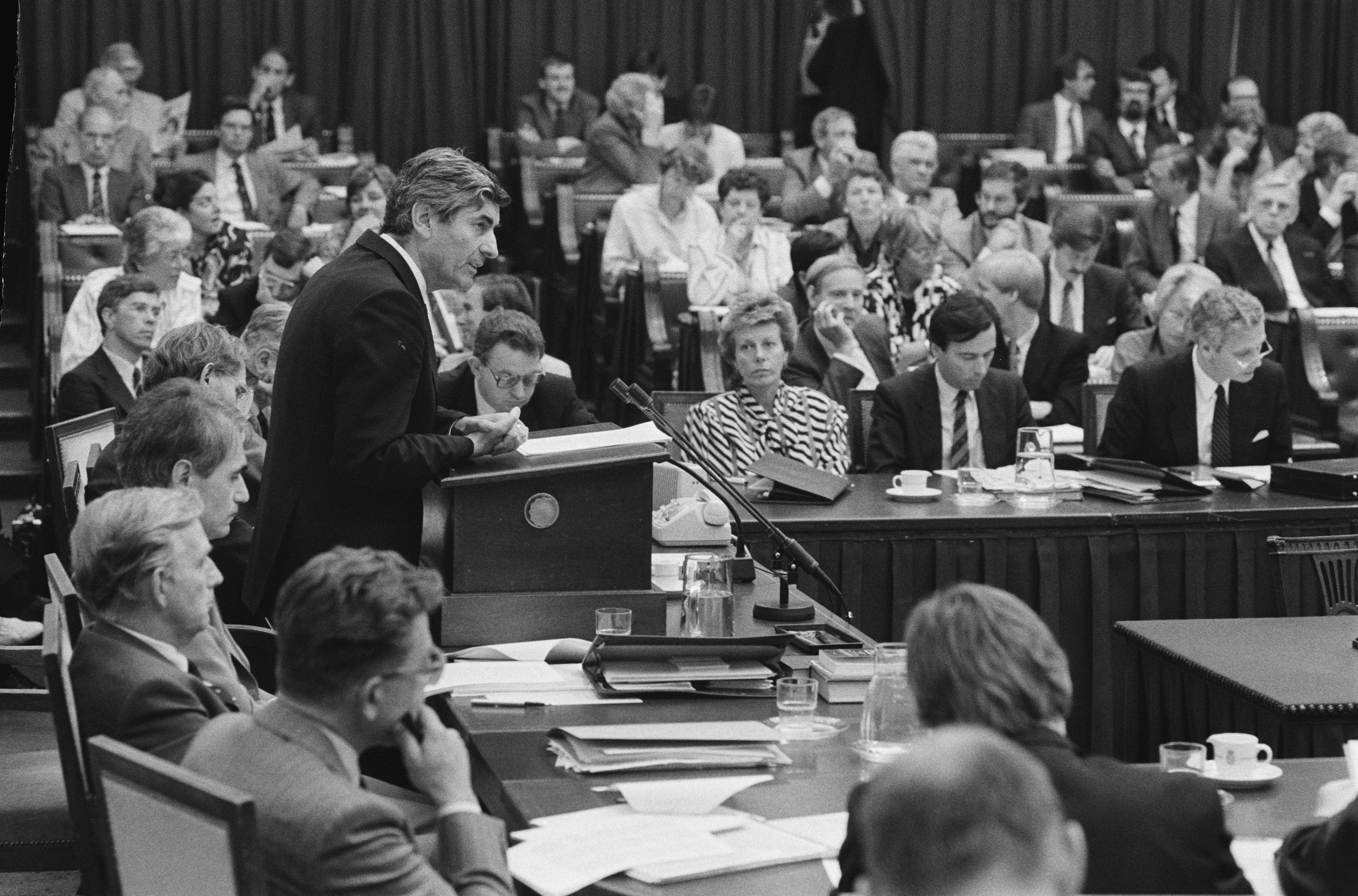
Lubbers during the debate on the government's statement.

The election result had major consequences for VVD leader Ed Nijpels, who was held responsible within his party for the heavy electoral losses. The day after the election, criticism emerged during a parliamentary party meeting led in part by future VVD leader Frits Bolkestein.

Nijpels was allowed to remain parliamentary leader until the cabinet formation had been completed. Afterwards, he was succeeded as leader of the VVD parliamentary party by Joris Voorhoeve, who shared party leadership in what was described as a "dualist" arrangement with the new Deputy Prime Minister Rudolf de Korte.

Nijpels himself joined the cabinet as Minister of Housing, Spatial Planning and the Environment. Persistent tensions within the VVD, partly caused by the increasingly unequal balance of power within the coalition, eventually contributed to the premature collapse of the Second Lubbers cabinet.
