= Second Lubbers cabinet =

Cabinet of the Netherlands, 1986 to 1989

- Cabinet of the Netherlands

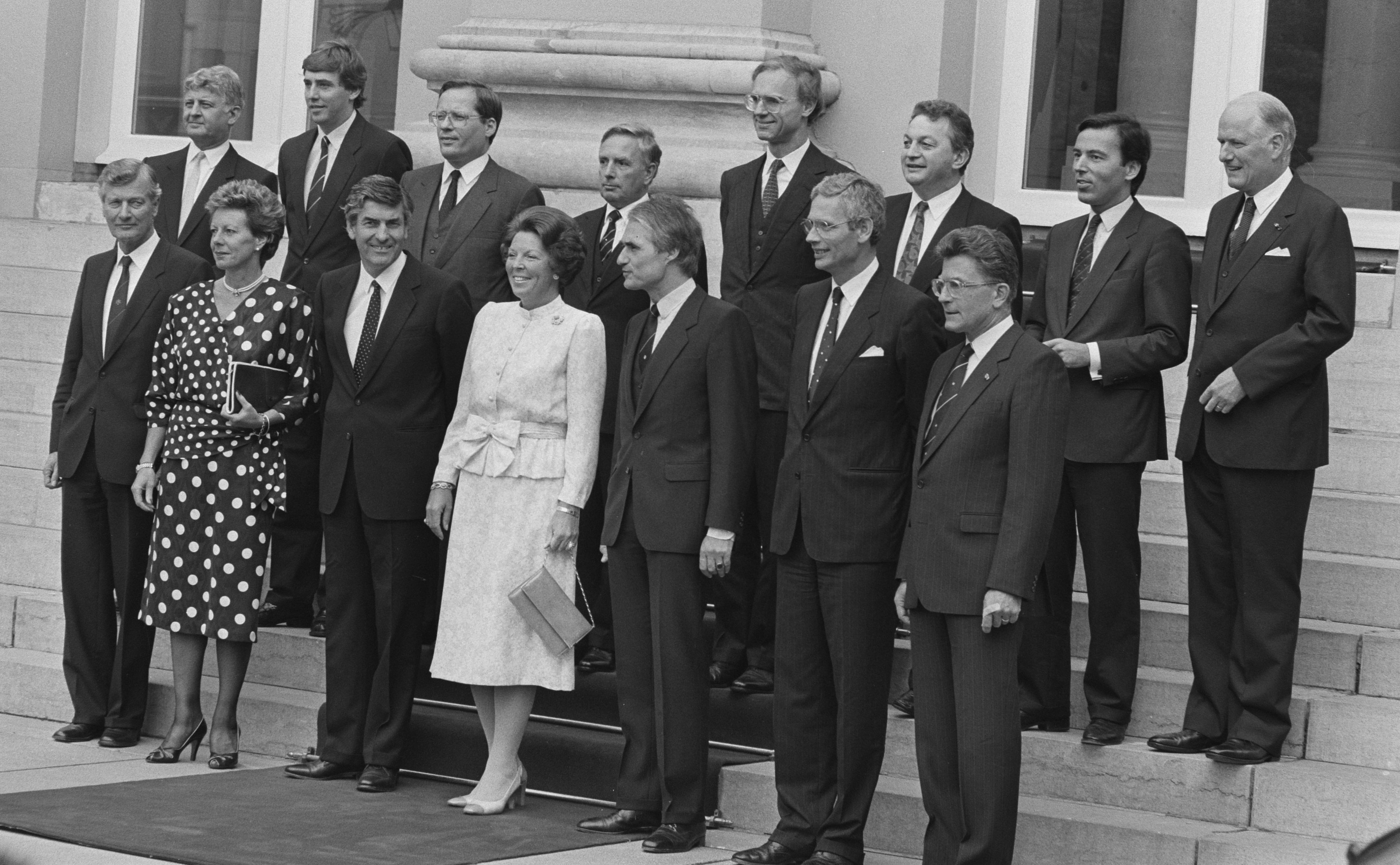
- The installation of the Second Lubbers cabinet on 14 July 1986
- Date formed: 14 July 1986
- Date dissolved: 7 November 1989; 3 years, 116 days in office (Demissionary from 3 May 1989)

People and organisations
- Monarch: Queen Beatrix
- Prime Minister: Ruud Lubbers
- Deputy Prime Minister: Rudolf de Korte
- No. of ministers: 14
- Ministers removed: 1
- Total no. of members: 16
- Member party: Christian Democratic Appeal (CDA); People's Party for Freedom and Democracy (VVD)
- Status in legislature: Centre-right majority government

History
- Incoming formation: 1986 formation
- Outgoing formation: 1989 formation
- Election: 1986 election
- Outgoing election: 1989 election
- Legislature terms: 1986–1989
- Predecessor: First Lubbers cabinet
- Successor: Third Lubbers cabinet

The second Lubbers cabinet was the executive branch of the Dutch Government from 14 July 1986 until 7 November 1989. The cabinet was a continuation of the previous First Lubbers cabinet and was formed by the Christian-democratic Christian Democratic Appeal (CDA) and the conservative-liberal People's Party for Freedom and Democracy (VVD) after the election of 1986. The cabinet was a centre-right coalition and had a substantial majority in the House of Representatives with Christian-Democratic Leader Ruud Lubbers serving Prime Minister. Former Liberal Leader Rudolf de Korte the Minister of the Interior in the previous cabinet served as Deputy Prime Minister and Minister of Economic Affairs.

The cabinet served in the middle of the turbulent 1980s. Domestically it had to deal with revitalizing the economy following the Early 1980s recession, reducing the deficit and stimulating deregulation and privatization, it was able to implement several major social reforms to social security, student loans, value-added taxes, public broadcasting and further stimulating Urban development. Internationally it had to deal with several crises such as the fallout of the decision to allow NATO to place the Medium Extended Air Defense System (MEADS) at Woensdrecht Air Base. The cabinet suffered several major internal conflicts including multiple resignations, the cabinet fell 3 years into its term on 3 May 1989 following a disagreement in the coalition over a proposed excise and the cabinet continued in a demissionary capacity until it was replaced with the Third Lubbers cabinet following the 1989 election.

== Formation ==
Composition of the cabinet in relation to the rest of the legislature

After the election on 21 May 1986 the Christian Democratic Appeal of incumbent Prime Minister Ruud Lubbers was the winner of the election winning nine new seats and had now a total of 54 seats. The Labour Party of Joop den Uyl gained 5 seats and had now a total of 52 seats. The People's Party for Freedom and Democracy under Ed Nijpels lost nine seats and now had a total of 27 seats in the House of Representatives, following this loss Ed Nijpels resigned as Leader of the People's Party for Freedom and Democracy on 9 July 1986 and was temporarily succeeded by Rudolf de Korte. On 23 May 1986 Queen Beatrix appointed Minister of Social Affairs and Employment Jan de Koning (CDA) as Informateur to start the cabinet formation process. The previous coalition of Christian Democratic Appeal and the People's Party for Freedom and Democracy agreed to continue the coalition. On 11 July 1986 Queen Beatrix subsequently appointed incumbent Prime Minister as Formateur and tasked him with forming a new cabinet. On 14 July 1986 the cabinet formation was completed and the Second Lubbers cabinet was installed with Ruud Lubbers beginning a second term as Prime Minister and Rudolf de Korte as the new Deputy Prime Minister.

On 21 July 1986 shortly after the cabinet formation Joop den Uyl who had been the Leader of the Labour Party since 13 September 1966 announced his retirement from front line politics and stood down on 21 July 1986 after serving 19 years as Leader of the Labour Party, he was succeeded by former Trade union leader Wim Kok who had only been a Member of the House of Representatives since 3 June 1986.

== Term ==
=== Changes ===
On 23 October 1986 State Secretary for Housing, Spatial Planning and the Environment Gerrit Brokx (CDA) resigned after Parliamentary leader of the Christian Democratic Appeal in the House of Representatives Bert de Vries lost his confidence in his ability to remain in office after a critical parliamentary inquiry. On 27 October 1986 State Secretary for Economic Affairs for international trade Enneüs Heerma (CDA) was appointed as his successor. On 30 October 1986 Member of the House of Representatives Yvonne van Rooy (CDA) was nominated to succeed him as State Secretary for Economic Affairs for international trade.

On 3 February 1987 Minister of the Interior Kees van Dijk (CDA) took a medical leave of absence after he had to undergo surgery as a result of heart problems. During his sick leave Minister of Social Affairs and Employment Jan de Koning (CDA) served as acting Minister of the Interior while State Secretary for Social Affairs and Employment Louw de Graaf (CDA) was temporarily appointed as Minister of Social Affairs and Employment. On 6 May 1987 Kees van Dijk returned from his sick leave and resumed his duties as Minister of the Interior.

On 6 September 1988 Minister of Defence Wim van Eekelen (VVD) resigned after the conclusions of a critical parliamentary inquiry into fraud was released about the time he had served as State Secretary for Foreign Affairs in the previous cabinet. On 9 September 1988 State Secretary for Foreign Affairs René van der Linden (CDA) also resigned. Minister for Development Cooperation Piet Bukman (CDA) served as acting Minister of Defence until 24 September 1988 when Member of the House of Representatives Frits Bolkestein (VVD), the former State Secretary for Economic Affairs was appointed as Minister of Defence. On 27 September 1988 Berend-Jan van Voorst tot Voorst (CDA), who until then had been working as senior official at the Ministry of Economic Affairs was sworn in as State Secretary for Foreign Affairs.

On 30 June 1989 State Secretary for Economic Affairs for small business policy Albert-Jan Evenhuis (VVD) resigned following a publication in the NRC Handelsblad after he had provided a dubious loan and subsidy and because the cabinet was already demissionary he was not replaced.

On 14 September 1989 Minister of Education and Sciences Wim Deetman (CDA) resigned after he was appointed as Speaker of the House of Representatives. Minister of Agriculture and Fisheries Gerrit Braks (CDA) served as acting Minister of Education and Sciences until the new cabinet took office on 7 November 1989.

On 1 October 1989 one month before the new cabinet took office State Secretary for Social Affairs and Employment Louw de Graaf (CDA) resigned after he was appointed as chairman of the trade associations of Insurance Companies.

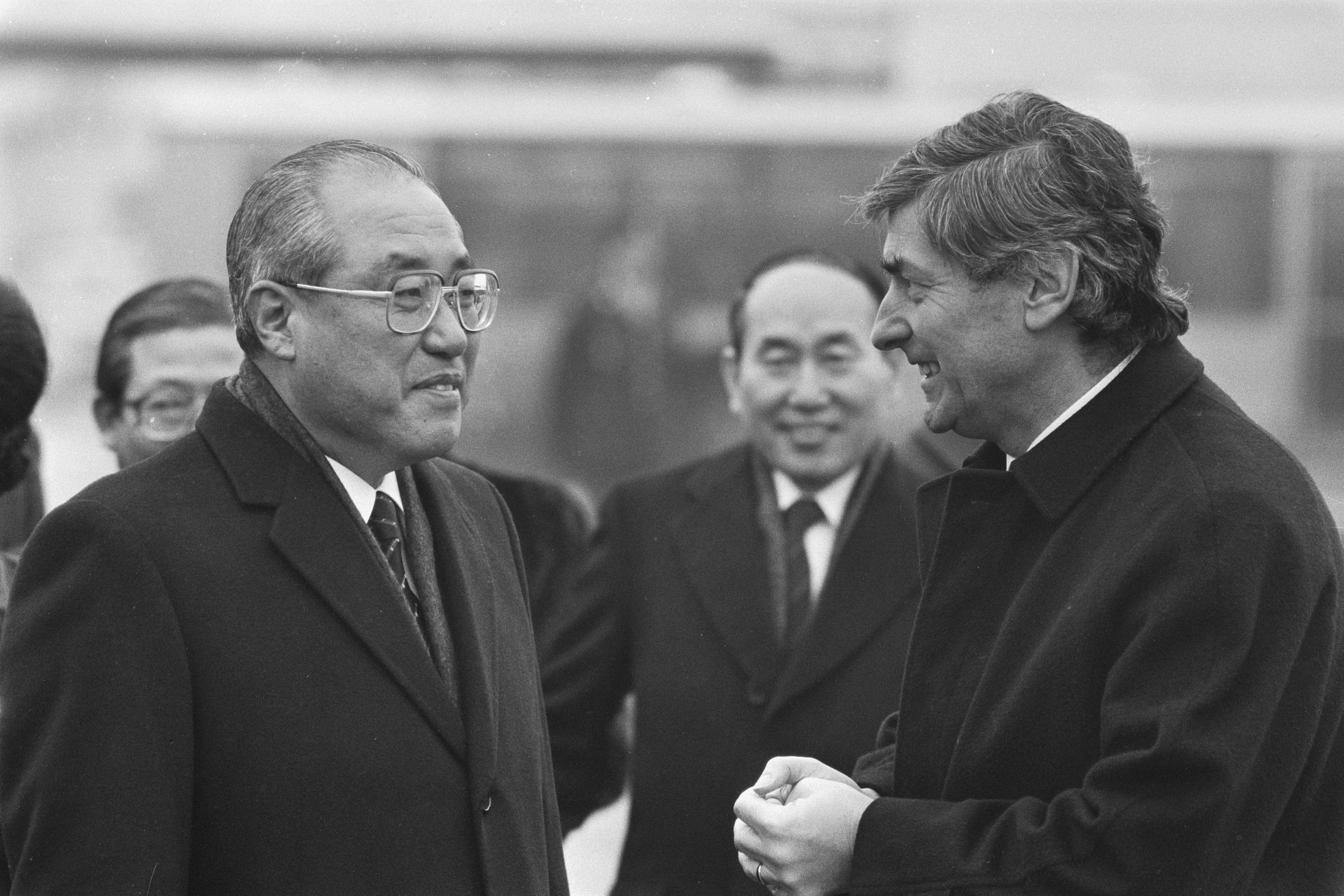
Prime Minister of South Korea Lho Shin-yong and Prime Minister Ruud Lubbers at Airport Schiphol on 20 January 1987.

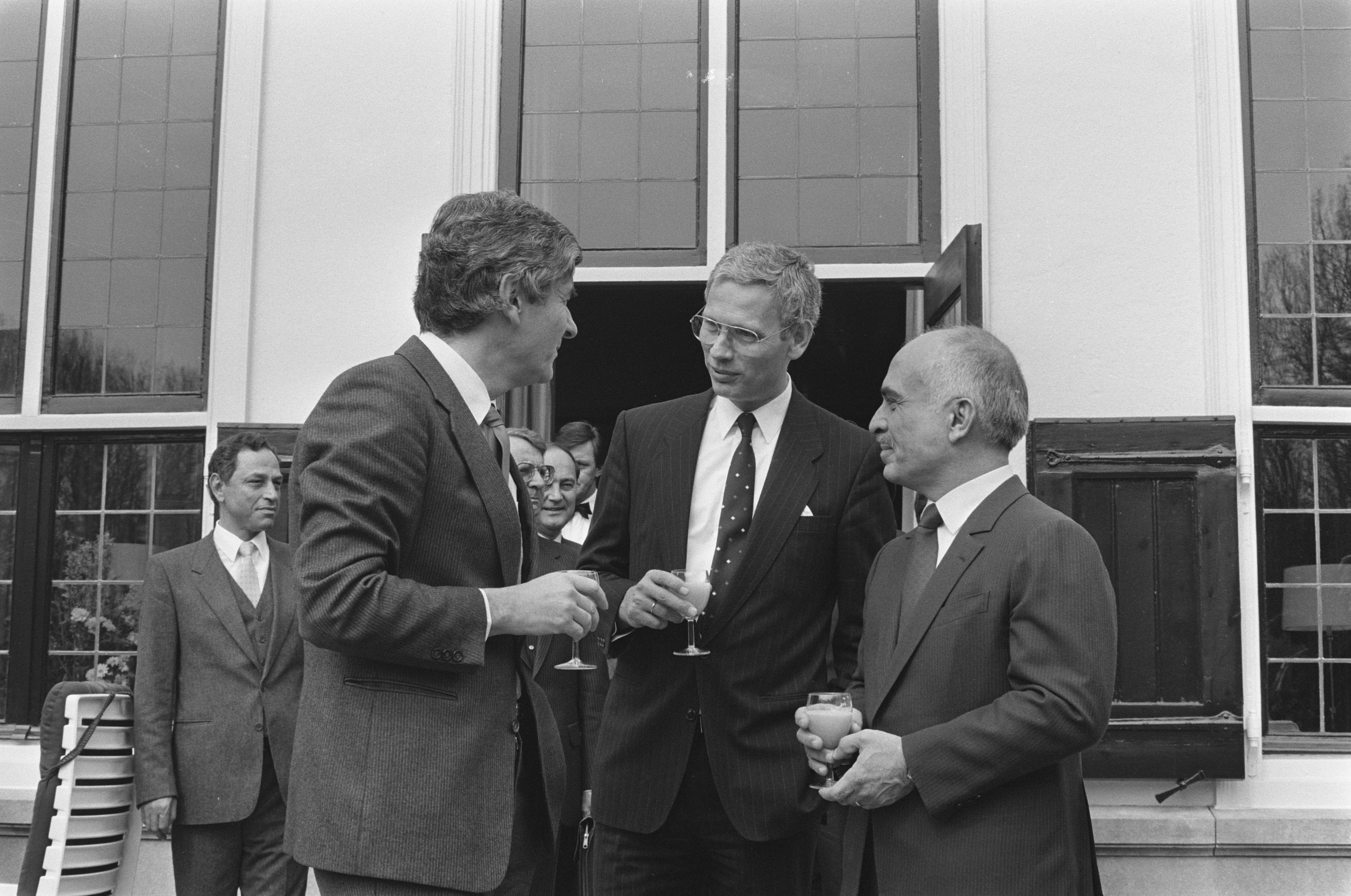
Prime Minister Ruud Lubbers, Minister of Foreign Affairs Hans van den Broek and King Hussein of Jordan at the Catshuis on 6 April 1987.

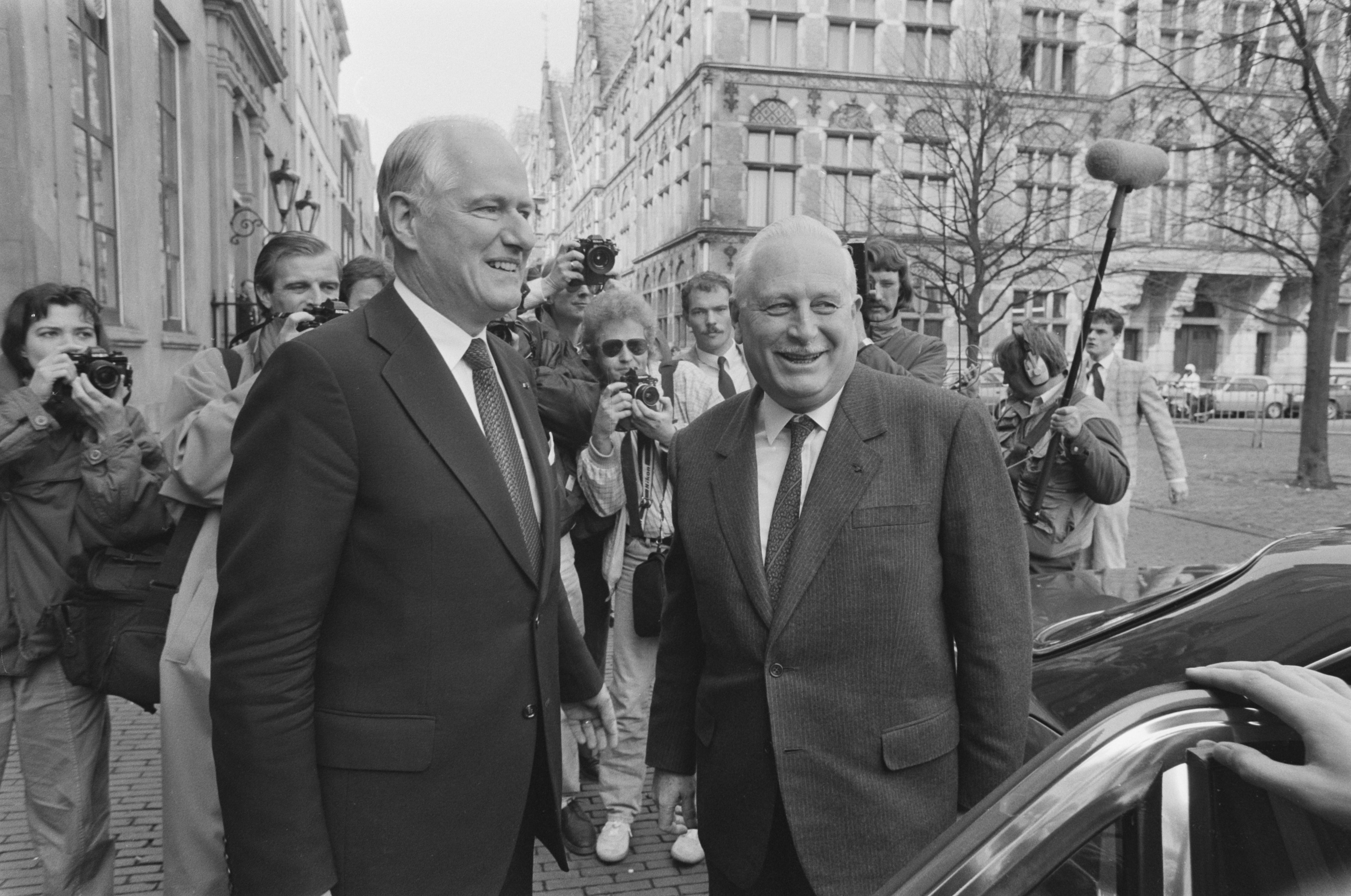
Minister of Defence Wim van Eekelen and French Minister of Defence André Giraud at the Ministry of Defence on 13 April 1987.

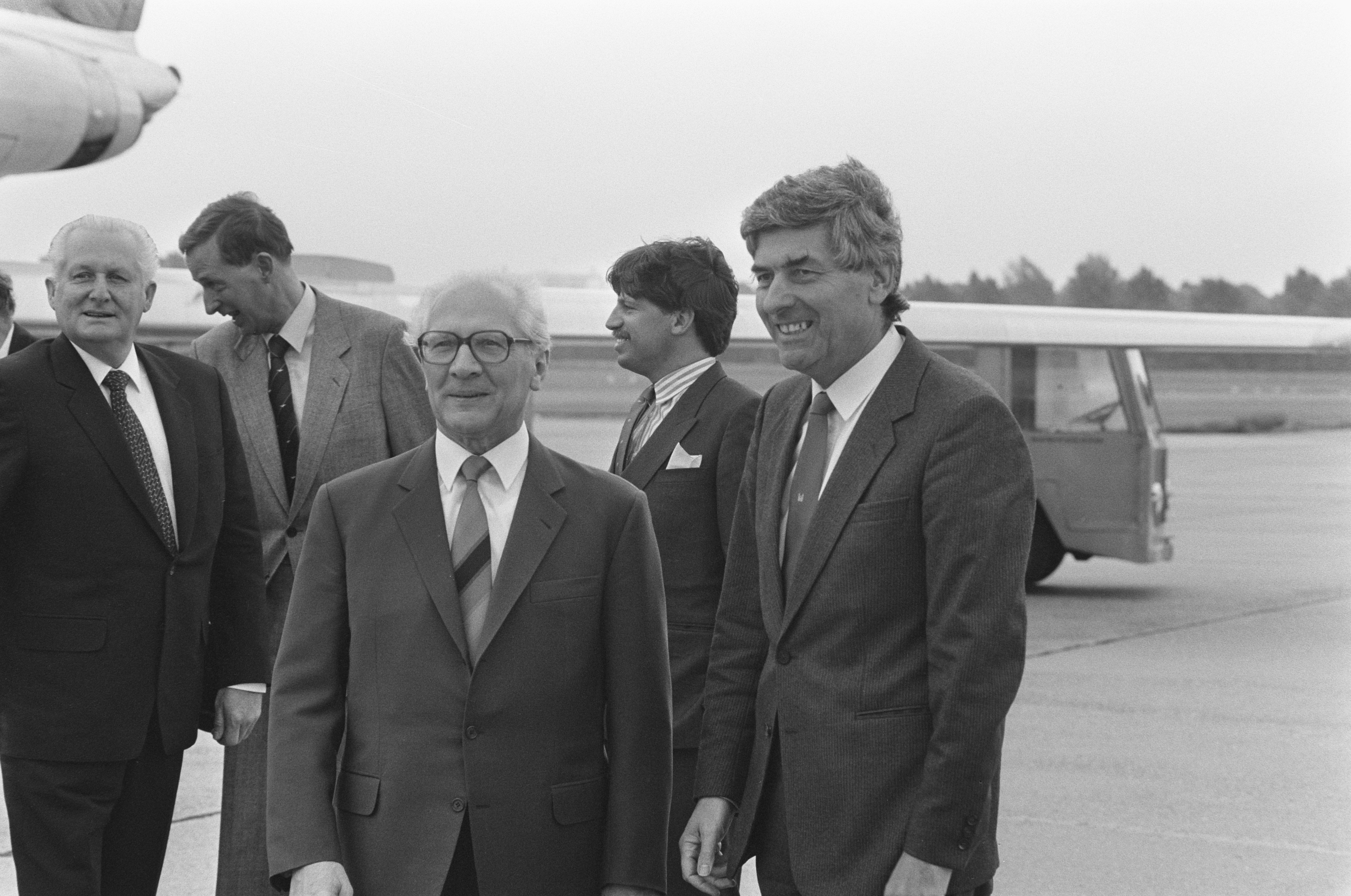
Leader of East-Germany Erich Honecker and Prime Minister Ruud Lubbers at Zestienhoven Airport on 3 June 1987.

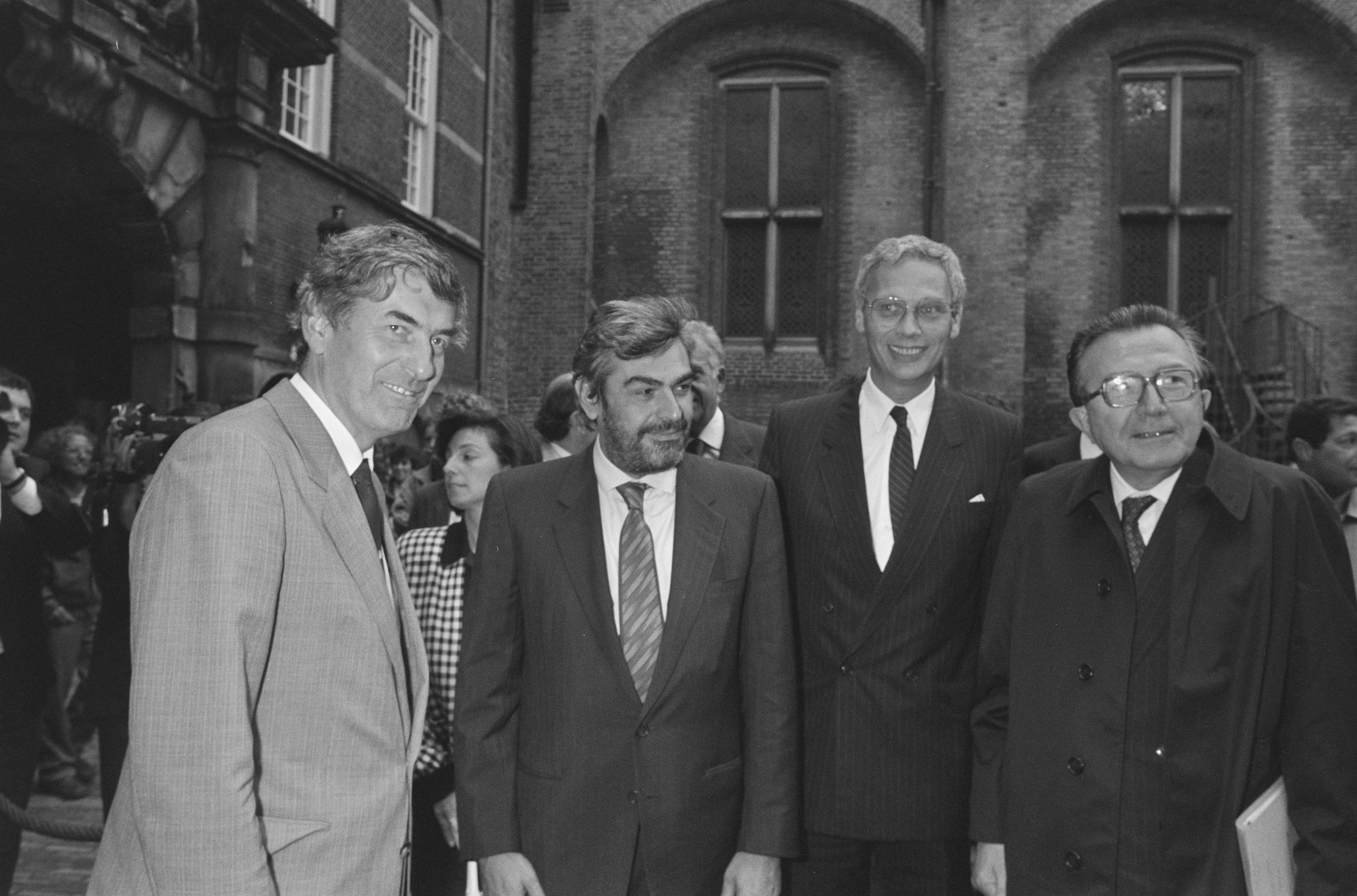
Prime Minister Ruud Lubbers, Prime Minister of Italy Giovanni Goria and Minister of Foreign Affairs Hans van den Broek at the Binnenhof on 10 September 1987.

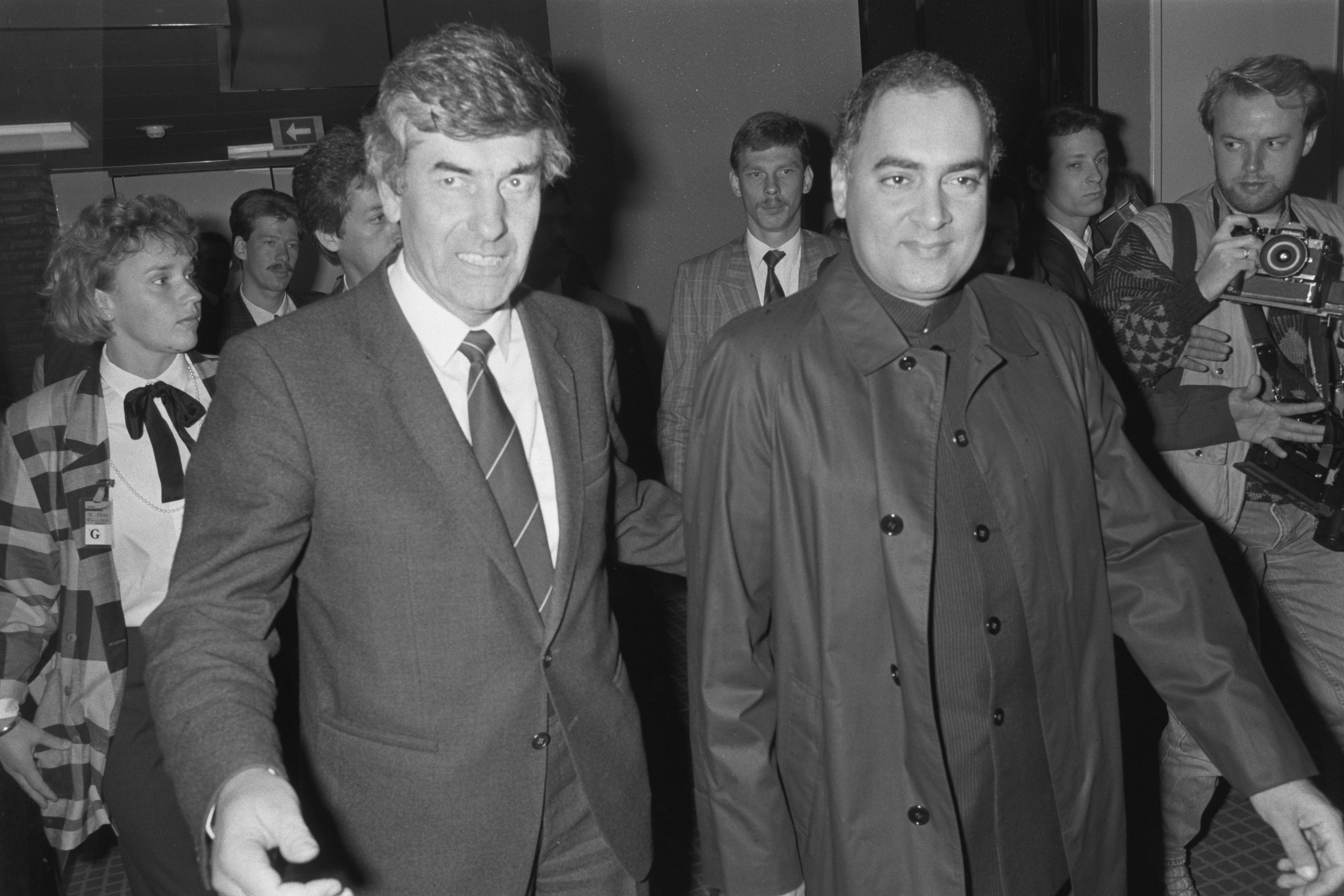
Prime Minister Ruud Lubbers and Prime Minister of India Rajiv Gandhi at Airport Schiphol on 21 October 1987.

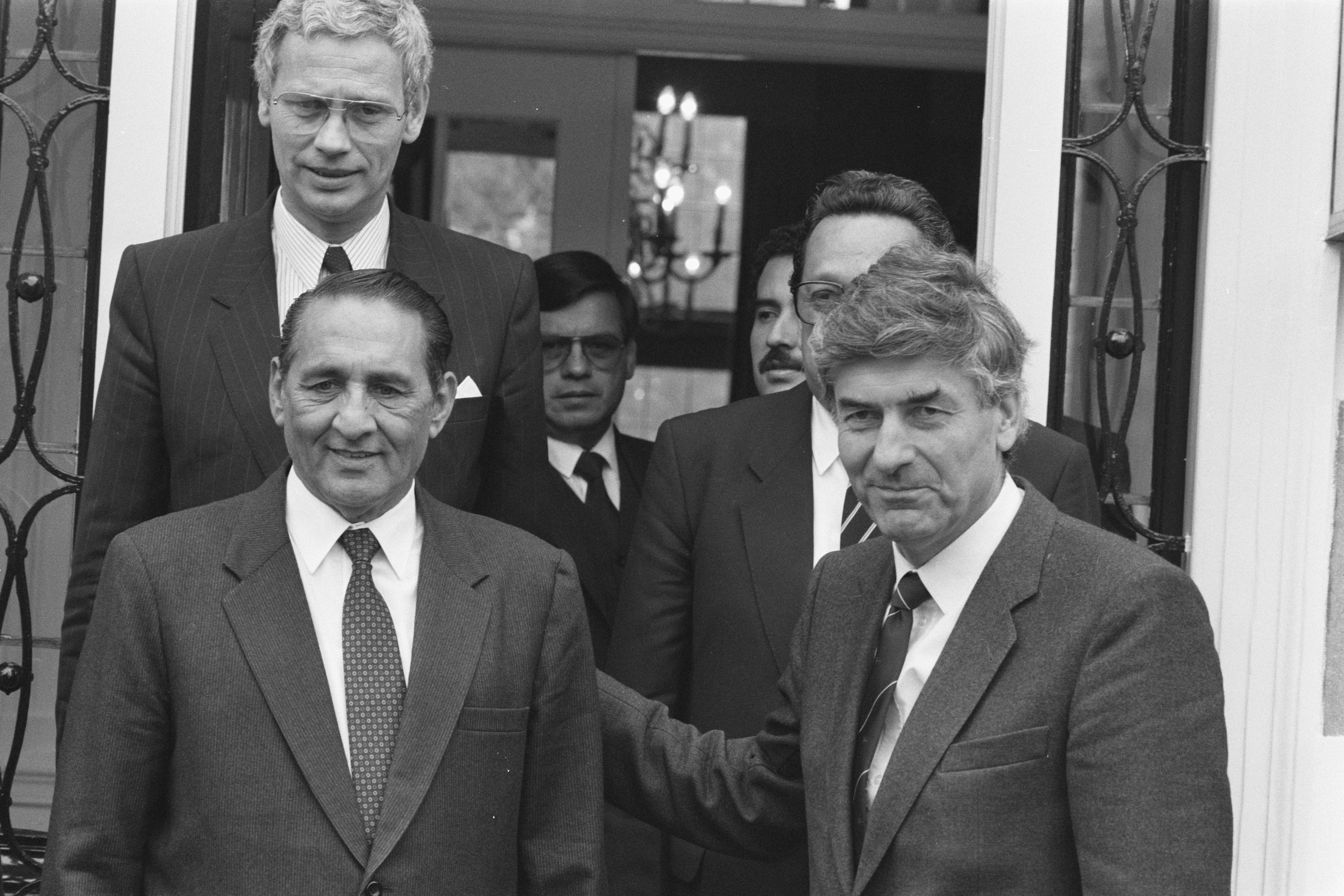
President of El Salvador José Napoleón Duarte, Minister of Foreign Affairs Hans van den Broek and Prime Minister Ruud Lubbers at the Catshuis on 21 October 1987.

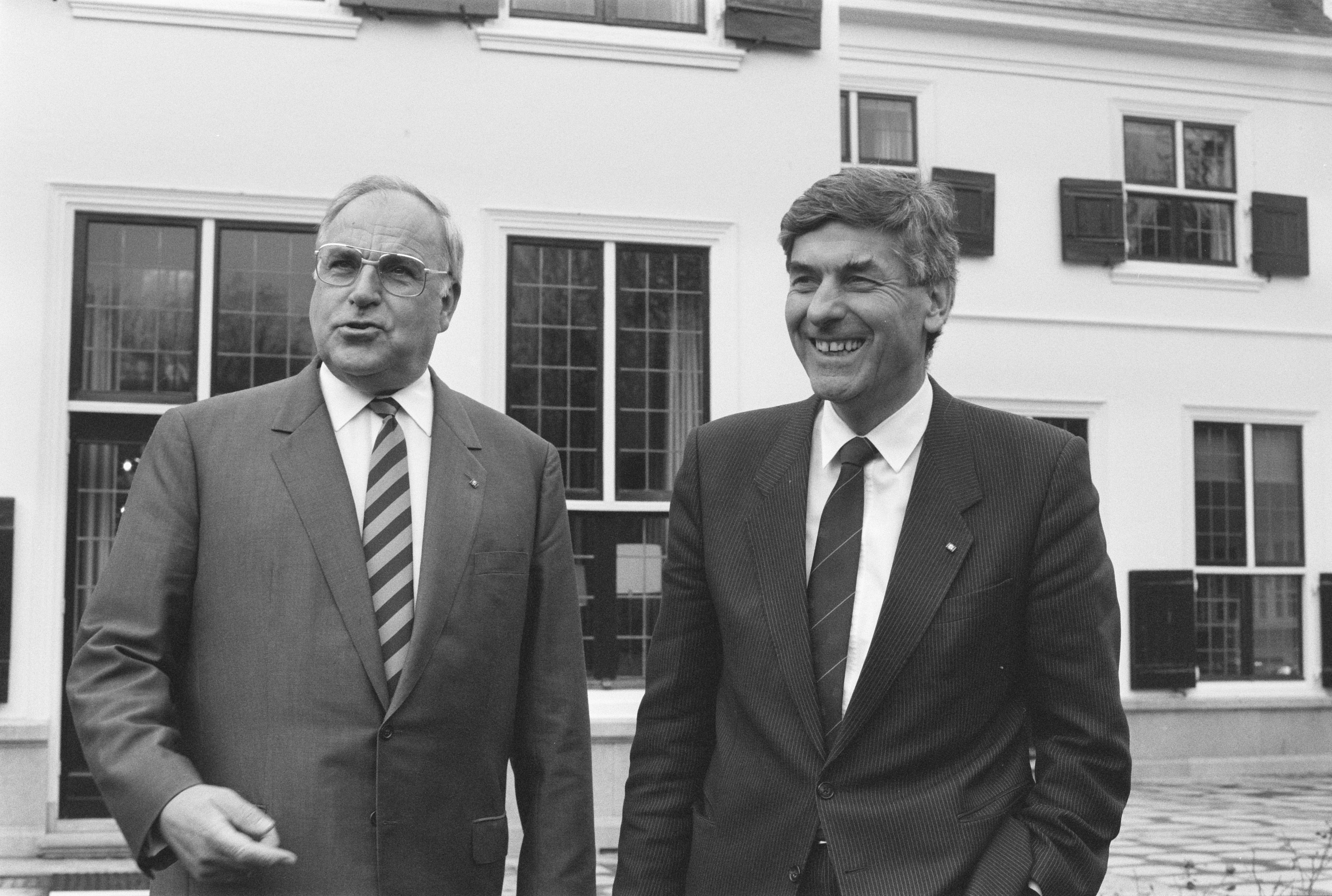
Chancellor of West-Germany Helmut Kohl and Prime Minister Ruud Lubbers at the Catshuis on 30 November 1987.

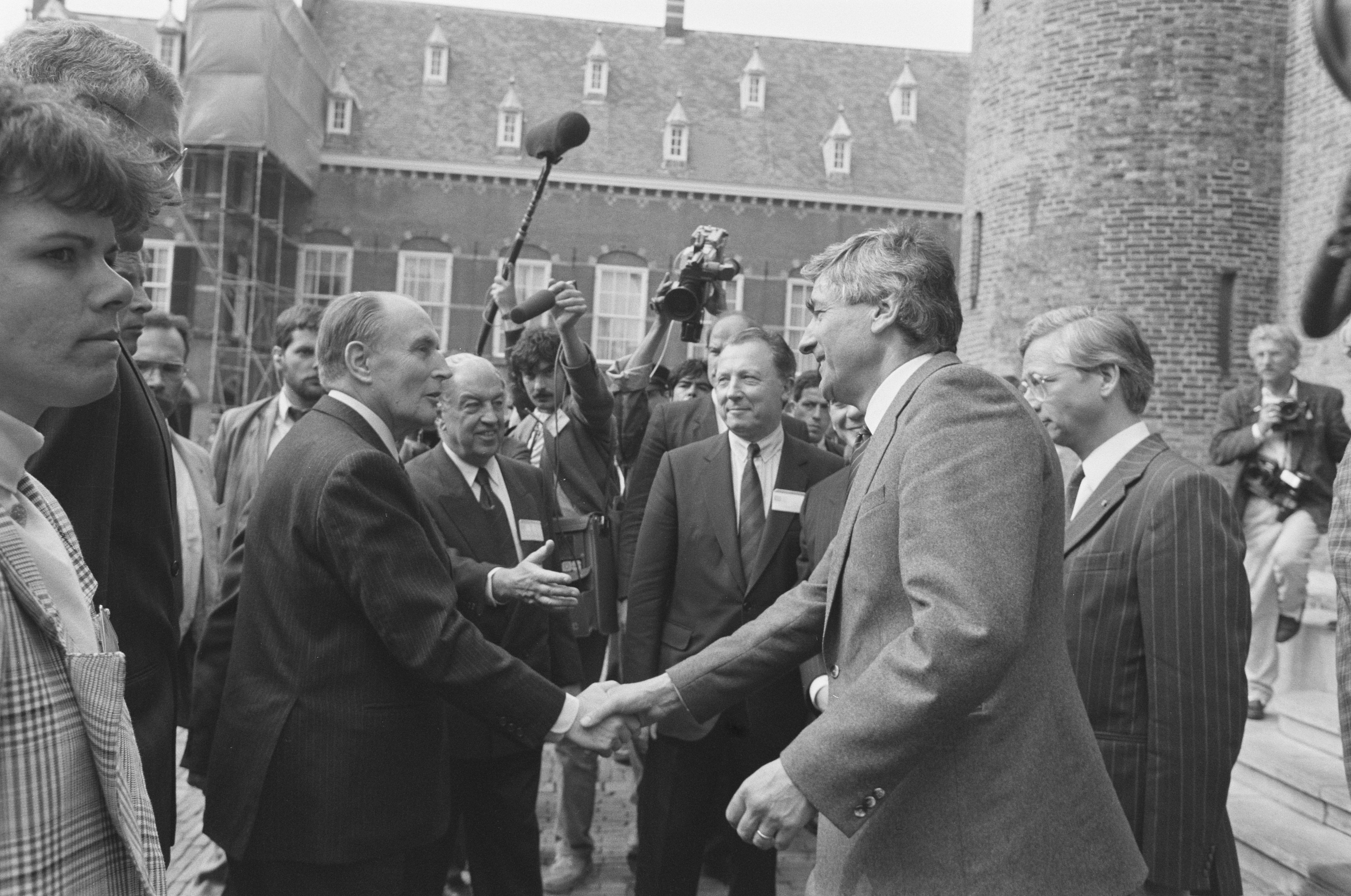
President of the France François Mitterrand, President of the European Commission Jacques Delors, Prime Minister Ruud Lubbers and Minister of Foreign Affairs Hans van den Broek at the Binnenhof on 7 May 1988.

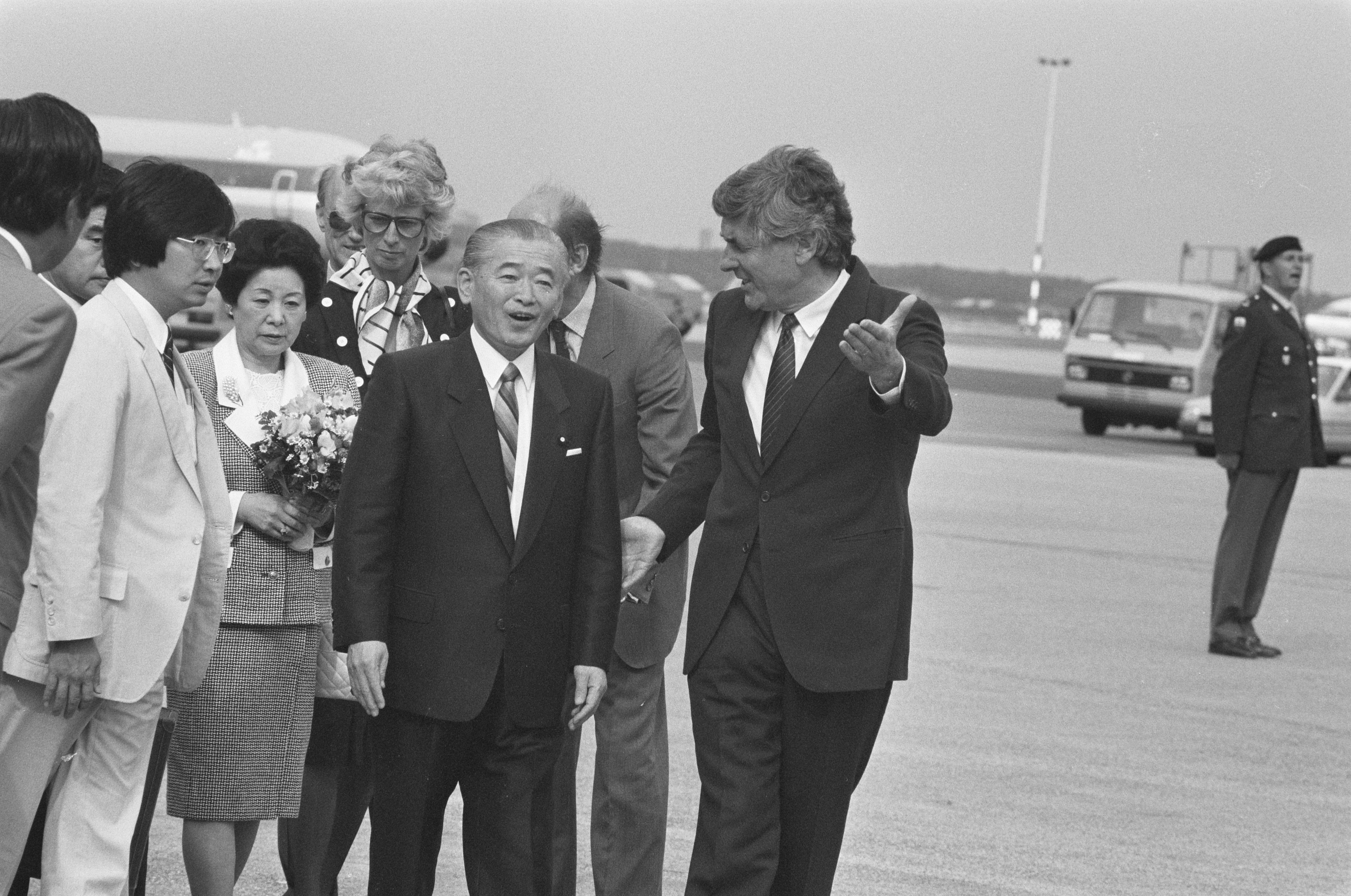
Prime Minister Ruud Lubbers and Prime Minister of Japan Noboru Takeshita at Airport Schiphol on 3 June 1988.

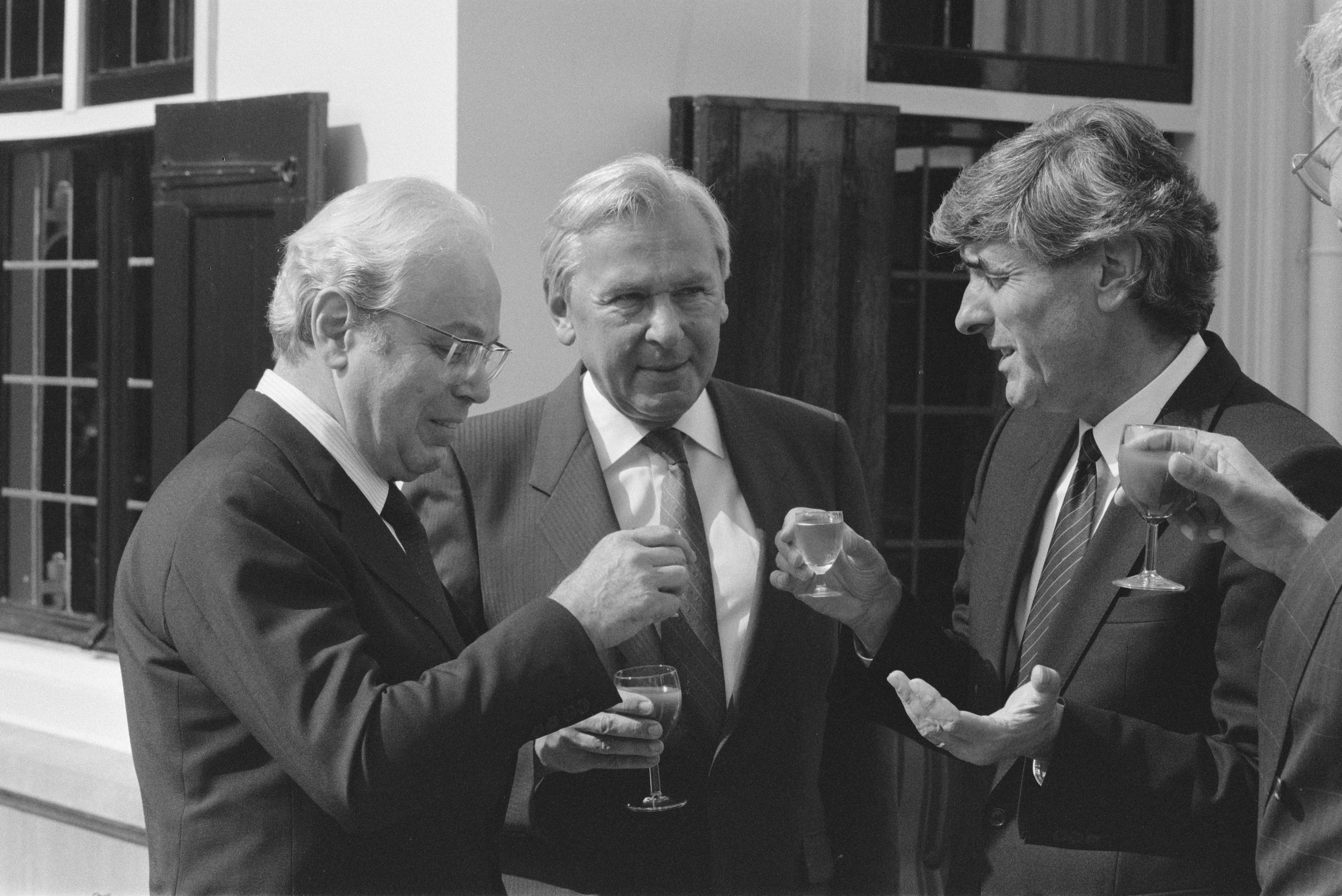
Secretary-General of the United Nations Javier Pérez de Cuéllar and Prime Minister Ruud Lubbers at the Catshuis on 6 September 1988.

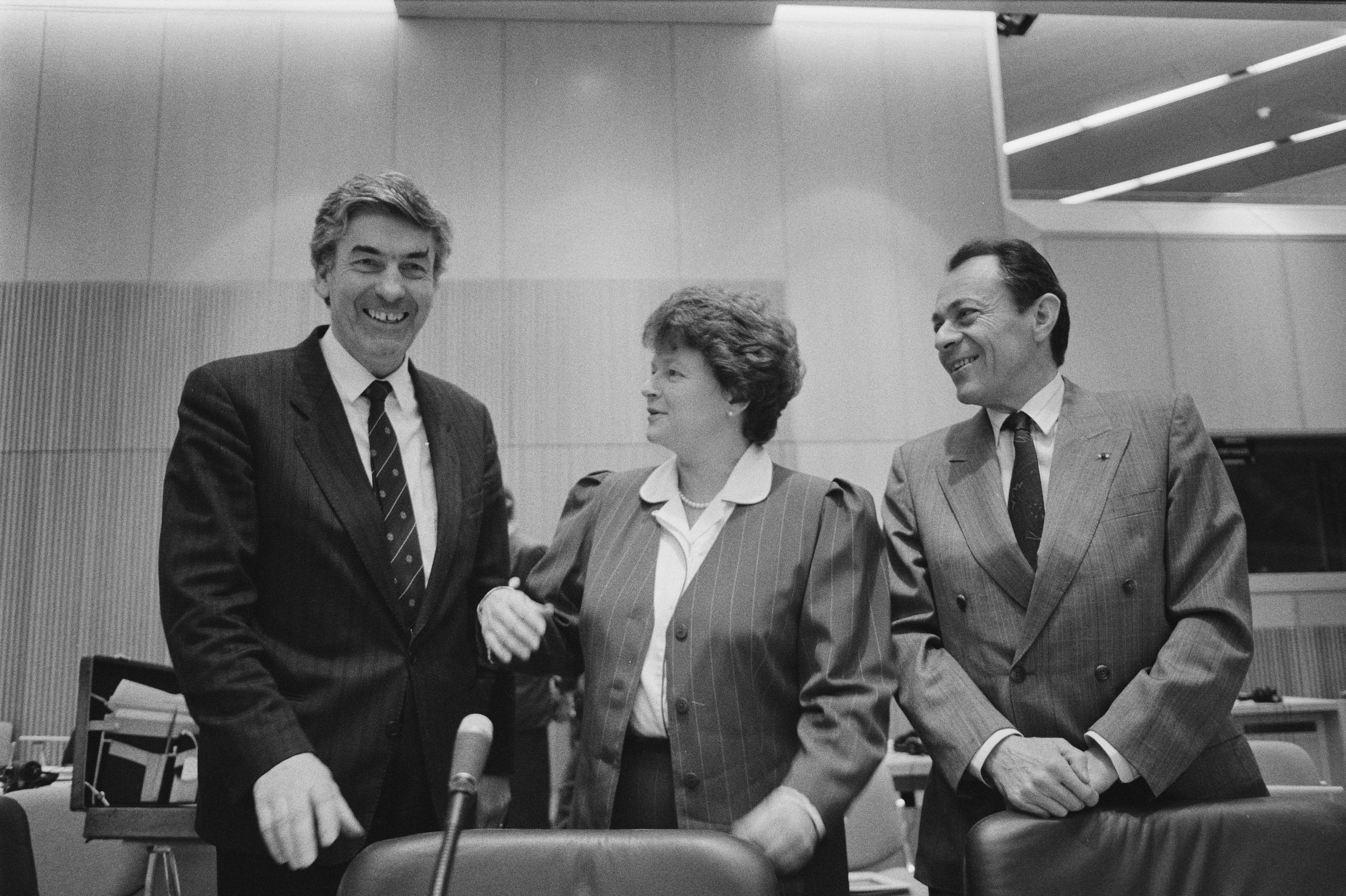
Prime Minister Ruud Lubbers, Prime Minister of Norway Gro Harlem Brundtland and Prime Minister of France Michel Rocard in The Hague on 10 March 1989.

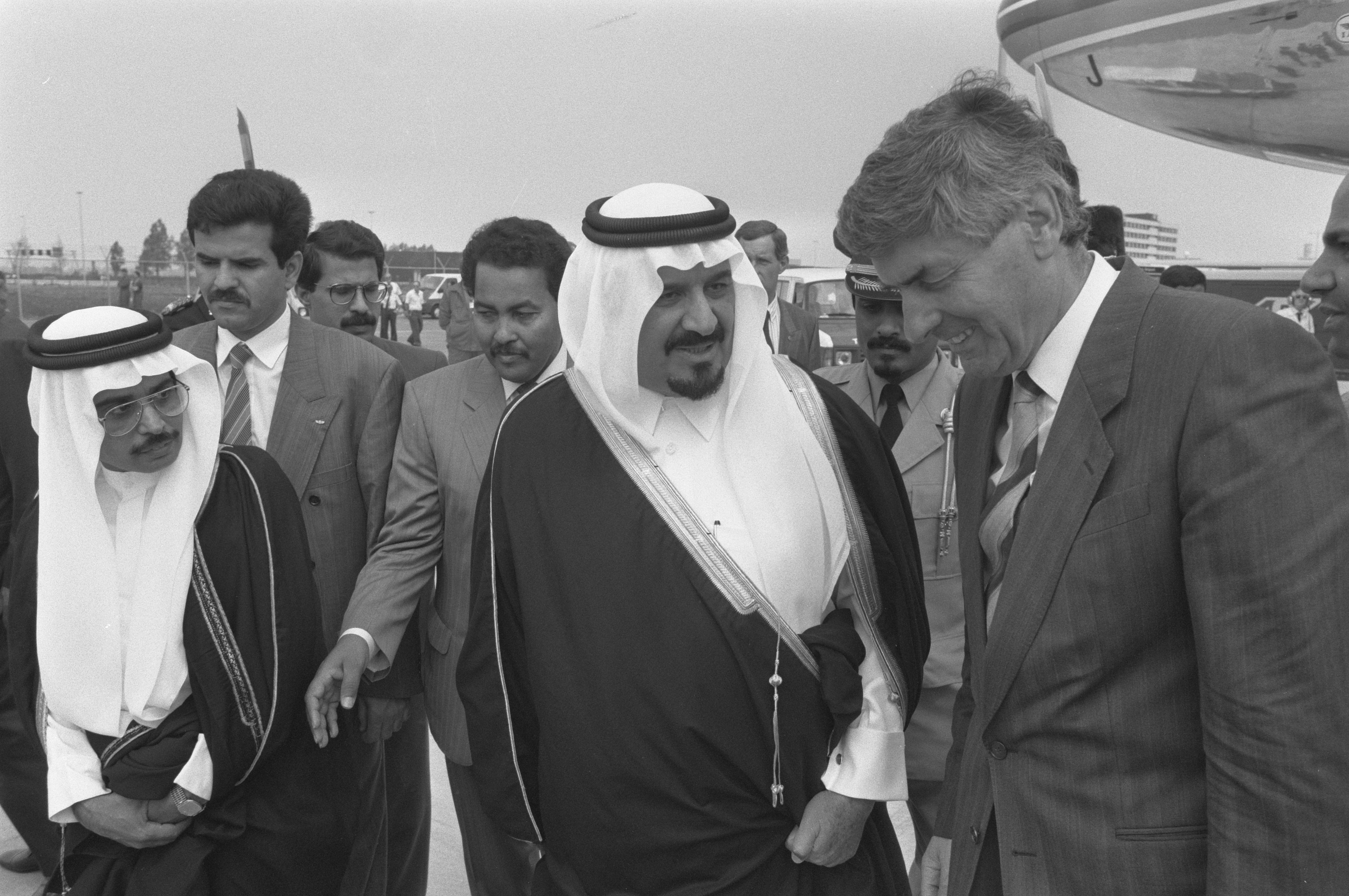
Saudi Arabian Minister of Defense Sultan bin Abdulaziz Al Saud and Prime Minister Ruud Lubbers at Airport Schiphol on 15 June 1989.

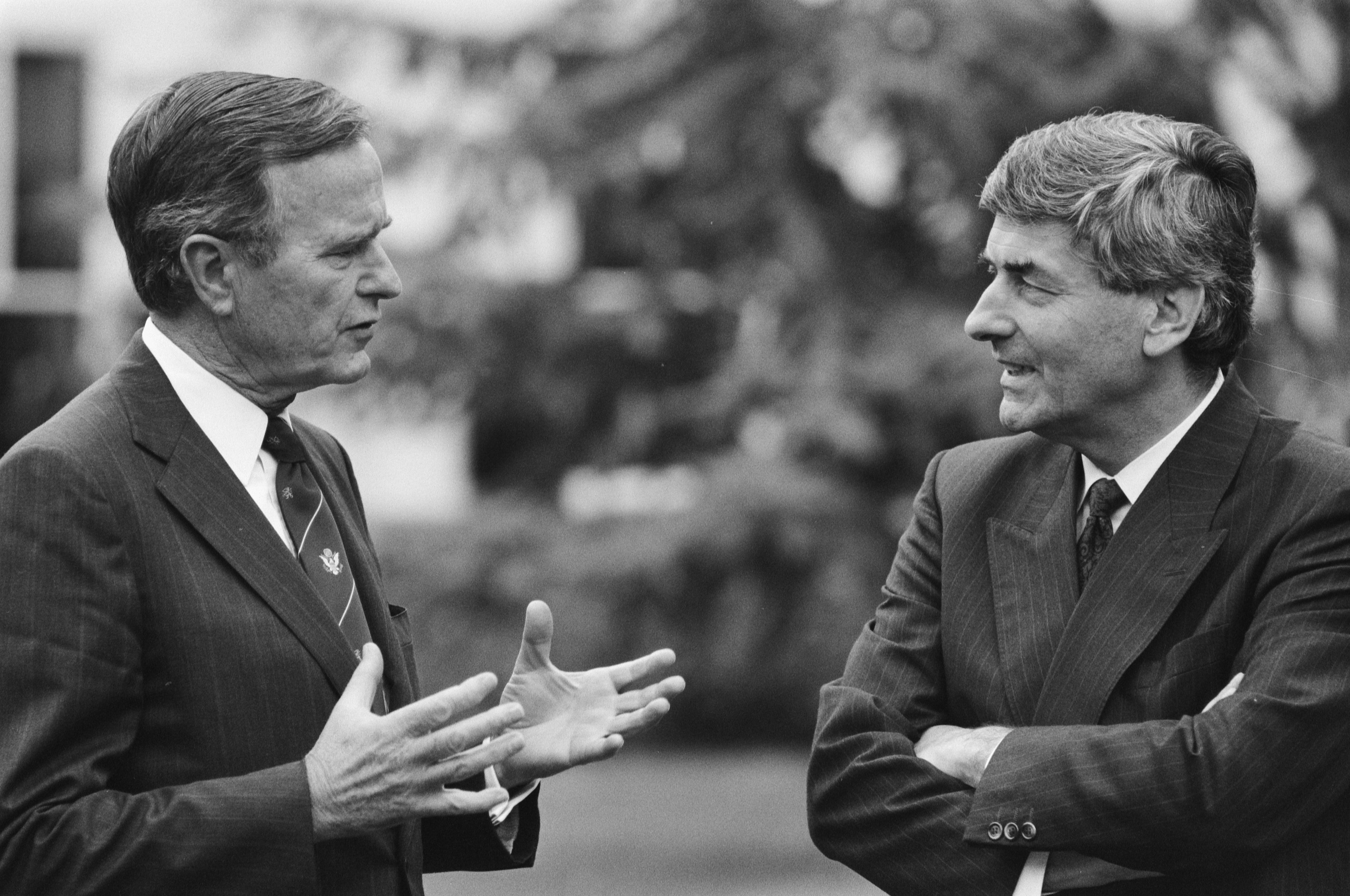
President of the United States George H. W. Bush and Prime Minister Ruud Lubbers at the Catshuis on 17 July 1989.

== Cabinet Members ==
Ministers		Title/Ministry/Portfolio(s)			Term of office	Party
Ruud Lubbers	Ruud Lubbers (1939–2018)	Prime Minister	General Affairs		4 November 1982 – 22 Augustus 1994^{[Retained]} ^{[Continued]}	Christian; Democratic Appeal
Rudolf de Korte	Rudolf de Korte (1936–2020)	Deputy; Prime Minister	Economic Affairs		14 July 1986 – 7 November 1989	People's Party for Freedom and Democracy
Rudolf de Korte	Rudolf de Korte (1936–2020)	Minister	Economic Affairs		14 July 1986 – 7 November 1989	People's Party for Freedom and Democracy
Kees van Dijk	Kees van Dijk (1931–2008)	Minister	Interior		14 July 1986 – 26 January 1987^{[Note]}	Christian; Democratic Appeal
Frits Korthals Altes	Frits; Korthals Altes (1931–2025)	Minister	Interior		26 January 1987 – 3 February 1987^{[Ad Interim]}	People's Party for Freedom and Democracy
Jan de Koning	Jan de Koning (1926–1994)	Minister	Interior		3 February 1987 – 6 May 1987^{[Acting]}	Christian; Democratic Appeal
Kees van Dijk	Kees van Dijk (1931–2008)	Minister	Interior		6 May 1987 – 7 November 1989	Christian; Democratic Appeal
Hans van den Broek	Hans van den Broek (1936–2025)	Minister	Foreign Affairs		4 November 1982 – 3 January 1993^{[Retained]} ^{[Continued]}	Christian; Democratic Appeal
Onno Ruding	Onno Ruding (born 1939)	Minister	Finance		4 November 1982 – 7 November 1989^{[Retained]}	Christian; Democratic Appeal
Frits Korthals Altes	Frits; Korthals Altes (1931–2025)	Minister	Justice		4 November 1982 – 7 November 1989^{[Retained]}	People's Party for Freedom and Democracy
Wim van Eekelen	Wim van Eekelen (1931–2025)	Minister	Defence		14 July 1986 – 6 September 1988^{[Res]}	People's Party for Freedom and Democracy
Piet Bukman	Piet Bukman (1934–2022)	Minister	Defence		6 September 1988 – 24 September 1988^{[Ad Interim]}	Christian; Democratic Appeal
Frits Bolkestein	Frits Bolkestein (1933–2025)	Minister	Defence		24 September 1988 – 7 November 1989	People's Party for Freedom and Democracy
Elco Brinkman	Elco Brinkman (1948–2026)	Minister	Welfare, Health and Culture		4 November 1982 – 7 November 1989^{[Retained]}	Christian; Democratic Appeal
Jan de Koning	Jan de Koning (1926–1994)	Minister	Social Affairs and Employment		4 November 1982 – 3 February 1987^{[Retained]} ^{[Note]}	Christian; Democratic Appeal
Louw de Graaf	Louw de Graaf (1930–2020)	Minister	Social Affairs and Employment		3 February 1987 – 6 May 1987^{[Acting]}	Christian; Democratic Appeal
Jan de Koning	Jan de Koning (1926–1994)	Minister	Social Affairs and Employment		6 May 1987 – 7 November 1989	Christian; Democratic Appeal
Wim Deetman	Wim Deetman (born 1945)	Minister	Education and Sciences		29 May 1982 – 14 September 1989^{[Retained]} ^{[App]}	Christian; Democratic Appeal
Gerrit Braks	Gerrit Braks (1933–2017)	Minister	Education and Sciences		14 September 1989 – 7 November 1989^{[Acting]}	Christian; Democratic Appeal
Neelie Kroes	Neelie Kroes (born 1941)	Minister	Transport and Water Management		4 November 1982 – 7 November 1989^{[Retained]}	People's Party for Freedom and Democracy
Gerrit Braks	Gerrit Braks (1933–2017)	Minister	Agriculture and Fisheries		4 November 1982 – 18 September 1990^{[Retained]} ^{[Continued]}	Christian; Democratic Appeal
Ed Nijpels	Ed Nijpels (born 1950)	Minister	Housing, Spatial; Planning and the Environment		14 July 1986 – 7 November 1989	People's Party for Freedom and Democracy
Ministers without portfolio		Title/Ministry/Portfolio(s)			Term of office	Party
Jan de Koning	Jan de Koning (1926–1994)	Minister	Interior	• Netherlands; Antilles and Aruba Affairs	29 May 1982 – 7 November 1989^{[Retained]}	Christian; Democratic Appeal
Piet Bukman	Piet Bukman (1934–2022)	Minister	Foreign Affairs	• Development; Cooperation	14 July 1986 – 7 November 1989	Christian; Democratic Appeal
State Secretaries		Title/Ministry/Portfolio(s)			Term of office	Party
Dieuwke de Graaff-Nauta	Dieuwke de Graaff-Nauta (1930–2008)	State Secretary	Interior	• Municipalities • Emergency; Services • Emergency; Management • Regional; Languages	14 July 1986 – 27 May 1994^{[Continued]}	Christian; Democratic Appeal
René van der Linden	René van der Linden (born 1943)	State Secretary^{[Title]}	Foreign Affairs	• European Union • Benelux	14 July 1986 – 9 September 1988^{[Res]}	Christian; Democratic Appeal
Berend-Jan van Voorst tot Voorst	Baron; Berend-Jan van Voorst tot Voorst (1944–2023)	State Secretary^{[Title]}	Foreign Affairs	• European Union • Benelux	27 September 1988 – 7 November 1989	Christian; Democratic Appeal
Henk Koning	Henk Koning (1933–2016)	State Secretary	Finance	• Fiscal Policy • Tax and Customs • Governmental; Budget	4 November 1982 – 7 November 1989^{[Retained]}	People's Party for Freedom and Democracy
Virginie Korte-van Hemel	Virginie; Korte-van Hemel (1929–2014)	State Secretary	Justice	• Immigration and Asylum • Civil Law • Youth Justice • Penitentiaries • Gambling	8 November 1982 – 7 November 1989^{[Retained]}	Christian; Democratic Appeal
Enneüs Heerma	Enneüs Heerma (1944–1999)	State Secretary	Economic Affairs	• Trade and Export^{[Title]}	17 July 1986 – 27 October 1986^{[App]}	Christian; Democratic Appeal
Yvonne van Rooy	Yvonne van Rooy (born 1951)	State Secretary	Economic Affairs	• Trade and Export^{[Title]}	30 October 1986 – 7 November 1989	Christian; Democratic Appeal
Albert-Jan Evenhuis	Albert-Jan; Evenhuis (1941–2011)	State Secretary	Economic Affairs	• Small and Medium-sized; Businesses • Regional; Development • Consumer; Protection • Tourism	14 July 1986 – 30 June 1989^{[Res]}	People's Party for Freedom and Democracy
Jan van Houwelingen	Jan van Houwelingen (1939–2013)	State Secretary	Defence	• Human; Resources • Equipment	14 September 1981 – 7 November 1989^{[Retained]}	Christian; Democratic Appeal
Dick Dees	Dick Dees (born 1944)	State Secretary	Welfare, Health and Culture	• Primary; Healthcare • Social Services • Environmental; Policy	14 July 1986 – 7 November 1989	People's Party for Freedom and Democracy
Louw de Graaf	Louw de Graaf (1930–2020)	State Secretary	Social Affairs and Employment	• Social Security • Unemployment • Occupational; Safety • Integration • Minorities	5 November 1982 – 3 February 1987^{[Retained]}	Christian; Democratic Appeal
Louw de Graaf	Louw de Graaf (1930–2020)	State Secretary	Social Affairs and Employment	• Social Security • Unemployment • Occupational; Safety • Integration • Minorities	6 May 1987 – 1 October 1989^{[Res]}	Christian; Democratic Appeal
Nell Ginjaar-Maas	Nell Ginjaar-Maas (1931–2012)	State Secretary	Education and Sciences	• Primary; Education • Secondary; Education • Adult; Education	5 November 1982 – 7 November 1989^{[Retained]}	People's Party for Freedom and Democracy
Gerrit Brokx	Gerrit Brokx (1933–2002)	State Secretary	Housing, Spatial; Planning and the Environment	• Urban Planning • Public Housing • Spatial Planning	5 November 1982 – 23 October 1986^{[Retained]} ^{[Res]}	Christian; Democratic Appeal
Enneüs Heerma	Enneüs Heerma (1944–1999)	State Secretary	Housing, Spatial; Planning and the Environment	• Urban Planning • Public Housing • Spatial Planning	27 October 1986 – 22 August 1994	Christian; Democratic Appeal

^{Resigned}
^{Retained from the previous cabinet}
^{Continued in the next cabinet}
^{Acting}
^{Ad Interim}
^{Died in Office}
^{Designated with the diplomatic rank of Minister}
^{Medical leave of absence from 26 January 1987 until 6 May 1987}
^{Appointed as Speaker of the House of Representatives}
^{Appointed as State Secretary for Housing, Spatial Planning and the Environment}

== Trivia ==
- Six cabinet members (later) served as Party Leaders and Lijsttrekkers: Ruud Lubbers (1982–1994), Elco Brinkman (1994) and Enneüs Heerma (1994–1997) of the Christian Democratic Appeal, Rudolf de Korte (1986), Frits Bolkestein (1990–1998) and Ed Nijpels (1982–1986) of the People's Party for Freedom and Democracy.
- Eight cabinet members had previous experience as scholars or professors: Rudolf de Korte (Business Administration), Jan de Koning (Social Geography), Onno Ruding (Business Economics), Wim van Eekelen (Political Science), Frits Bolkestein (Business Economics and Corporate Law), Gerrit Braks (Agronomy), Henk Koning (Tax Law) and Nell Ginjaar-Maas (Chemistry and Pedagogy)
- Three cabinet members later served as European Commissioner: Hans van den Broek (1993–1999), Frits Bolkestein (1999–2004) and Neelie Kroes (2004–2014).
- Five cabinet members later served as in high-profile international functions: Ruud Lubbers (United Nations High Commissioner for Refugees), Wim van Eekelen (Secretary General of the Western European Union), Piet Bukman (President of the European People's Party), Frits Bolkestein (President of the Liberal International) and René van der Linden (President of the Parliamentary Assembly of the Council of Europe).
- Five cabinet members later served as legislative speakers: Frits Korthals Altes (1997–2001), Gerrit Braks (2001–2003) en René van der Linden (2009–2011) for the Senate, Wim Deetman (1989–1996) en Piet Bukman (1996–1998) for the House of House of Representatives.
