= Ed Nijpels =

Dutch politician (born 1950)

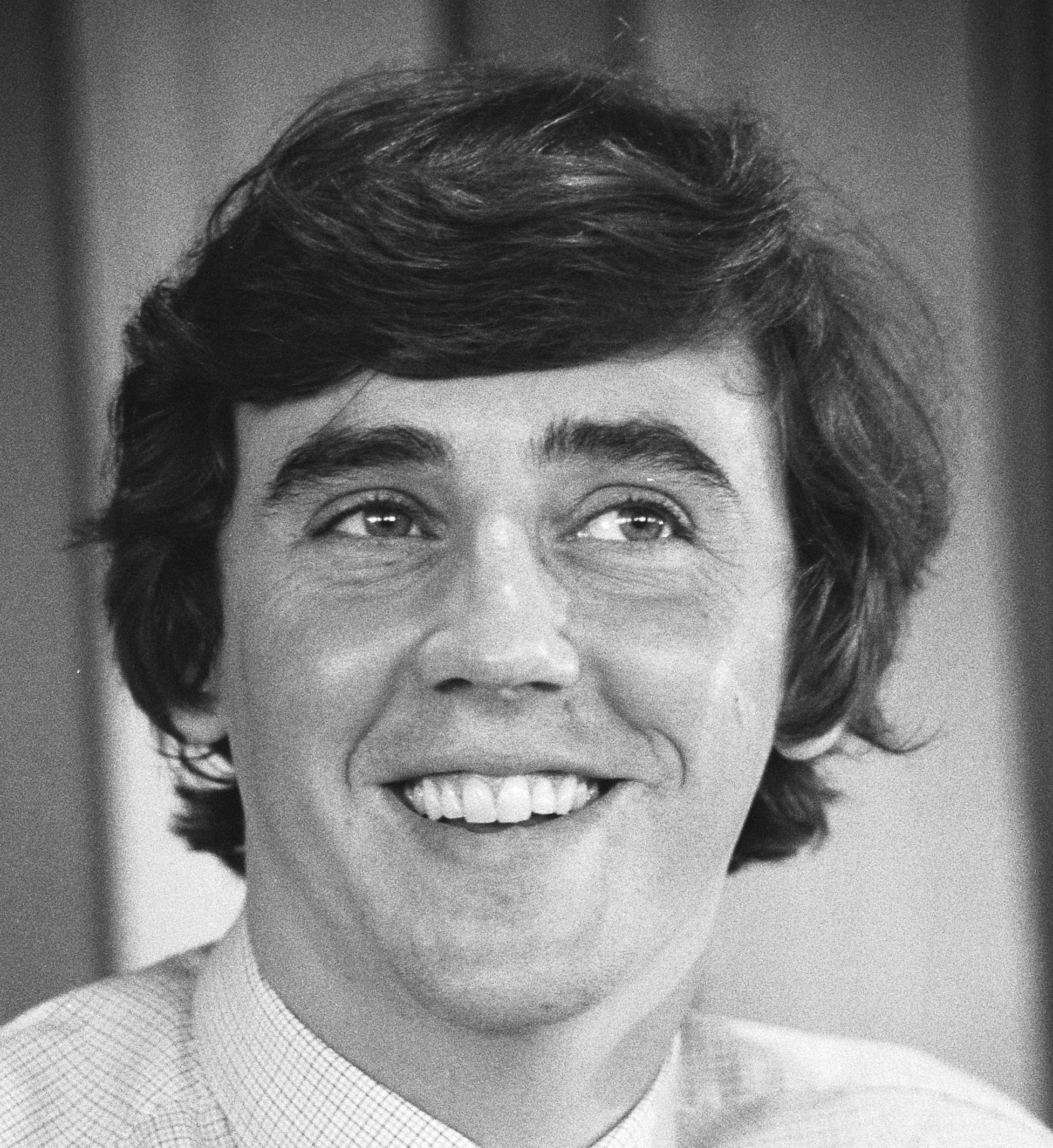
- Nijpels in 1982

Member of the Social and Economic Council
- Incumbent
- Assumed office 15 August 2014
- Chair: Wiebe Draijer (2014); Mariëtte Hamer (from 2014)

Queen's Commissioner of Friesland
- In office 1 January 1999 – 1 May 2008
- Monarch: Beatrix
- Preceded by: Gerard van Klaveren (Ad Interim)
- Succeeded by: John Jorritsma

Mayor of Breda
- In office 1 April 1990 – 1 July 1995
- Preceded by: Frans Feij
- Succeeded by: Chris Rutten

Minister of Housing, Spatial Planning and the Environment
- In office 14 July 1986 – 7 November 1989
- Prime Minister: Ruud Lubbers
- Preceded by: Pieter Winsemius
- Succeeded by: Hans Alders

Leader of the People's Party for Freedom and Democracy
- In office 20 April 1982 – 9 July 1986
- Deputy: See list: Rudolf de Korte Loek Hermans Gijs van Aardenne
- Preceded by: Hans Wiegel
- Succeeded by: Rudolf de Korte

Parliamentary leader in the House of Representatives
- In office 20 April 1982 – 9 July 1986
- Preceded by: Hans Wiegel
- Succeeded by: Joris Voorhoeve
- Parliamentary group: People's Party for Freedom and Democracy

Member of the House of Representatives
- In office 14 September 1989 – 4 April 1990
- In office 8 June 1977 – 14 July 1986
- Parliamentary group: People's Party for Freedom and Democracy

Personal details
- Born: Eduardus Hermannus Theresia Maria Nijpels; 1 April 1950 (age 76) Den Helder, Netherlands
- Party: People's Party for Freedom and Democracy (from 1968)
- Spouses: Ingrid Pieters (m. 1983; div. 1995) Elsbeth Janmaat (m. 1997)
- Children: 2 sons
- Education: Utrecht University (BSL, MSL)
- Occupation: Politician; civil servant; Jurist; businessperson; Corporate director; nonprofit director; trade association executive; teacher; lobbyist; activist

Eduardus Hermannus Theresia Maria Nijpels (born 1 April 1950) is a Dutch politician of the People's Party for Freedom and Democracy (VVD) and nonprofit director.

== Biography ==
Nijpels studied Civil law at the Utrecht University obtaining a Master of Studies in Law degree. Nijpels served as chairman of the political youth organisation JOVD from February 1974 until November 1975. Nijpels worked as a civics teacher in Roosendaal from August 1974 until June 1977. After the election of 1977 Nijpels was elected as a Member of the House of Representatives on 8 June 1977 serving as a frontbencher chairing the House Committee on Law enforcement and spokesperson for Justice and the Ombudsman. After the Party Leader and Parliamentary leader Hans Wiegel announced he was stepping down he endorsed Nijpels as his successor and he was anonymously selected as his successor on 20 April 1982.

For the elections of 1982 Nijpels served as lead candidate and following a cabinet formation with Christian-democratic Leader Ruud Lubbers formed the first Lubbers cabinet with Nijpels opting to remain as Parliamentary leader. For the election of 1986 Nijpels again served as lead candidate but shortly thereafter announced that he was stepping down following disappointed election results on 9 July 1986. After a cabinet formation the coalition continued and Nijpels was appointed Minister of Housing, Spatial Planning and the Environment in the Cabinet Lubbers II taking office on 14 July 1986. After the election of 1989 Nijpels returned to the House of Representatives on 14 September 1989 and served as a frontbencher and spokesperson for Spatial Planning and the Environment. In March 1990 Nijpels was nominated as the Mayor of Breda serving from 1 April 1990 until 1 July 1995 when he was appointed director-general for the Arbodienst of the Ministry of Social Affairs and Employment. In December 1998 Nijpels was nominated as the next Queen's Commissioner of Friesland serving from 1 January 1999 until 1 May 2008.

Nijpels semi-retired from active politics and became active in the private and public sectors as a corporate and non-profit director and served on several state commissions and councils on behalf of the government, and works as a trade association executive serving as Chairman of the Koninklijke NLingenieurs from May 2008 until May 2015, the GeoBusiness association since September 2009 and for the Industry and Employers confederation (VNO-NCW) from July 2008 until March 2015 and became a Member of the Social and Economic Council in August 2014. Nijpels continues to be active an advocate, lobbyist and activist for Environmentalism, Sustainable development, Conservation and Climate change.

== Decorations ==
Honours
Ribbon bar	Honour	Country	Date	Comment
	Knight of the Order of the Netherlands Lion	Netherlands	20 November 1989	
	Commander of the Order of Orange-Nassau	Netherlands	20 May 2008	

Party political offices
Preceded by Hans Wiegel; 1981	Lijsttrekker of the People's Party for Freedom and Democracy; 1982 • 1986	Succeeded by Joris Voorhoeve; 1989
Preceded by Hans Wiegel	Leader of the People's Party for Freedom and Democracy; 1982–1986	Succeeded by Rudolf de Korte
Preceded by Hans Wiegel	Parliamentary leader of the People's Party for Freedom and Democracy in the House of Representatives; 1982–1986	Succeeded by Joris Voorhoeve
Political offices
Preceded by Pieter Winsemius	Minister of Housing, Spatial; Planning and the Environment; 1986–1989	Succeeded by Hans Alders
Preceded by Frans Feij	Mayor of Breda; 1990–1995	Succeeded by Chris Rutten
Preceded by Loek Hermans	Queen's Commissioner of Friesland; 1999–2008	Succeeded by John Jorritsma
Civic offices
Unknown	Director-General of the Arbodienst of the Ministry of Social Affairs and Employment; 1995–1999	Unknown
Preceded by Albert-Jan Evenhuis	Chairman of the Supervisory board of the Cadastre Agency; 2001–2009	Succeeded by Sybilla Dekker
Preceded by Aad Kosto	Chairman of the Supervisory board of the Probation Agency; 2007–2017	Succeeded by Liesbeth Spies
Preceded by Elco Brinkman	Chairman of the Supervisory board of Public Pension Funds APB; 2009–2010	Succeeded by Harry Borghouts
Preceded by Hans Alders	Chairman of the Supervisory board of the Environment Central Foundation; 2015–present	Incumbent
Preceded by Office established	Chairman of the Supervisory board of the Climate Council; 2018–present	Incumbent
Business positions
Unknown	Vice Chairman of the Supervisory board of the DSB Bank; 2004–2009	Succeeded by Office discontinued
Preceded by Annemarie Jorritsma	Chairman of the Supervisory board of the Bosschap association 2008–2014	Succeeded by Alfred Veltman
Preceded by Office established	Chairman of the Engineering association 2008–2015	Succeeded by Johan van den Elzen
Preceded by Office established	Chairman of the GeoBusiness association 2009–present	Incumbent
Non-profit organization positions
Preceded by Roy Lantain	Chairman of the Executive Board of the Youth Organisation Freedom and Democracy; 1974–1975	Succeeded by Johan Remkes
Preceded by Pieter Beelaerts van Blokland	Chairman of the Supervisory board of the World Wide Fund for Nature Netherlands; 1990–1999	Succeeded by Hans Wijers
Preceded by Berend-Jan van Voorst tot Voorst	Chairman of the Supervisory board of Ronald McDonald House; Charities Netherlands; 1997–2013	Succeeded by Marja van Bijsterveldt
Preceded by Elco Brinkman	Chairman of the Supervisory board of International Architecture; Biennal Rotterdam; 2011–present	Incumbent
Preceded by Wim Deetman	Chairman of the Supervisory board of ProDemos; 2018–present	Incumbent
Media offices
Preceded by Karel van Doodewaerd	Chairman of the Supervisory board of TROS; 2008–2014	Organisation merged
Preceded by Office established	Chairman of the Supervisory board of AVROTROS; 2014–present	Incumbent
