= Rudolf de Korte =

Dutch politician (1936–2020)

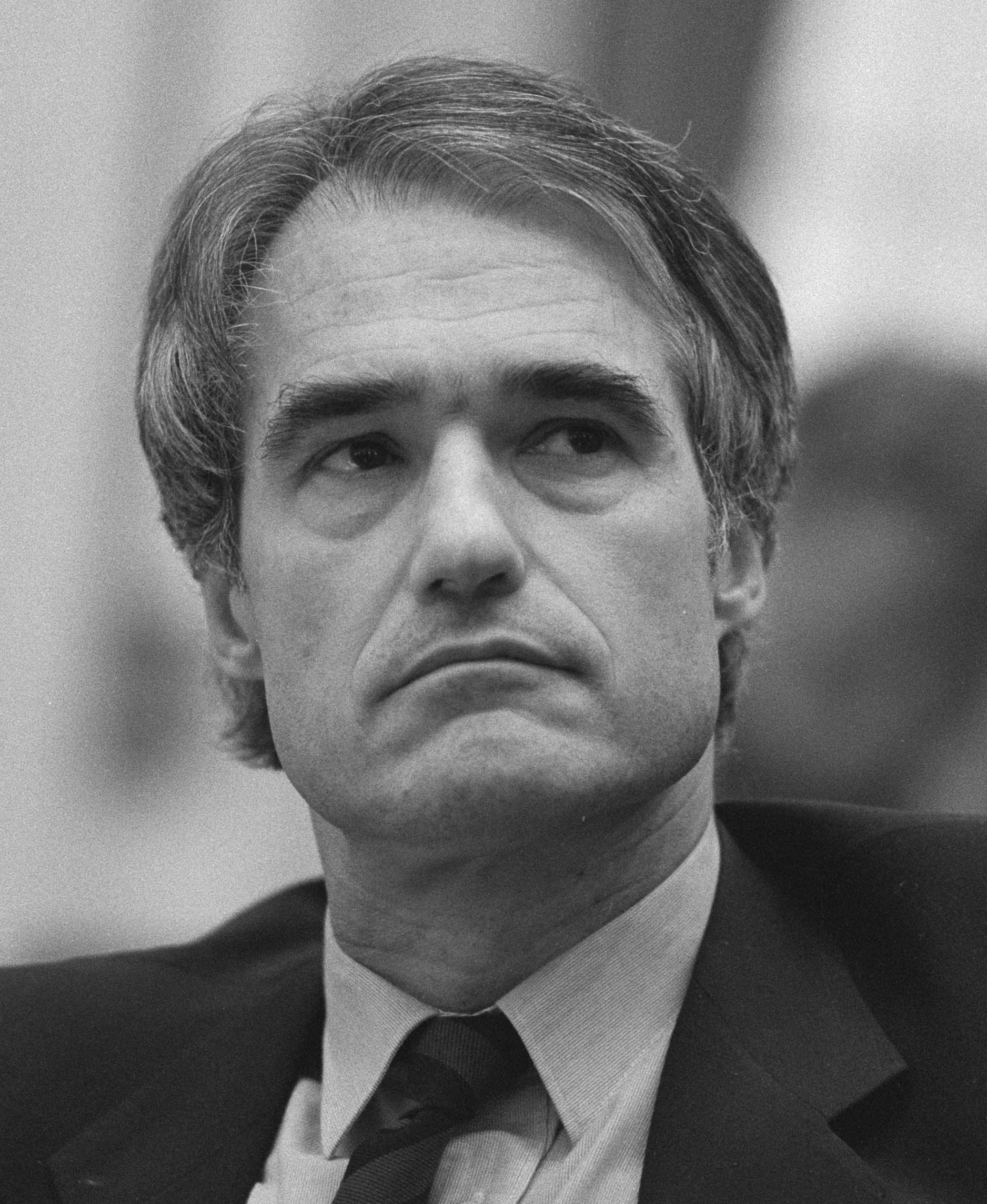
- Rudolf de Korte in 1985

Deputy Prime Minister
- In office 14 July 1986 – 7 November 1989
- Prime Minister: Ruud Lubbers
- Preceded by: Gijs van Aardenne
- Succeeded by: Wim Kok

Minister of Economic Affairs
- In office 14 July 1986 – 7 November 1989
- Prime Minister: Ruud Lubbers
- Preceded by: Gijs van Aardenne
- Succeeded by: Koos Andriessen

Leader of the People's Party for Freedom and Democracy
- In office 9 July 1986 – 15 December 1986
- Preceded by: Ed Nijpels
- Succeeded by: Joris Voorhoeve

Minister of the Interior
- In office 12 March 1986 – 14 July 1986
- Prime Minister: Ruud Lubbers
- Preceded by: Frits Korthals Altes (Ad interim)
- Succeeded by: Kees van Dijk

Member of the House of Representatives
- In office 14 September 1989 – 1 September 1995
- In office 3 June 1986 – 14 July 1986
- In office 22 December 1977 – 12 March 1986
- Parliamentary group: People's Party for Freedom and Democracy

Personal details
- Born: Rudolf Willem de Korte; 8 July 1936 The Hague, Netherlands
- Died: 9 January 2020 (aged 83) Wassenaar, Netherlands
- Party: People's Party for Freedom and Democracy (from 1959)
- Spouse: Karin de Korte (m. 1966)
- Children: 1 son and 1 daughter
- Education: Leiden University (Bachelor of Science, Master of Science, Doctor of Science); Harvard University (Master of Business Administration); Cranfield University (Master of Business and Management)
- Occupation: Politician · Chemist · Researcher · Businessman · Salesman · Banker · Corporate director · Nonprofit director

Rudolf Willem de Korte (Dutch: [ˈrydɔl(ə)f ˈʋɪləm də ˈkɔrtə]; 8 July 1936 – 9 January 2020) was a Dutch politician of the People's Party for Freedom and Democracy (VVD) and businessman.

== Life and career ==
De Korte was born in The Hague, Netherlands. He attended the Maerlant-Lyceum from May 1948 until June 1954, and studied at the Leiden University in September 1954 majoring in Chemistry and obtaining a Bachelor of Science degree in July 1957, before graduating with a Master of Science degree with honors on 18 October 1961, and worked as a researcher before he got a doctorate as a Doctor of Science in Chemistry on 21 May 1964. De Korte studied at the Harvard Business School of the Harvard University in Cambridge, Massachusetts in January 1962 for a postgraduate education in Business administration obtaining a Master of Business Administration degree in November 1964. De Korte subsequently studied at the Cranfield University in Cranfield, England in May 1962 for another postgraduate education in Business administration graduating with a Master of Business and Management degree in December 1964. De Korte worked as a salesman for Unilever from December 1964 until December 1977 in Hong Kong from December 1964 until March 1966 and in Addis Ababa, Ethiopia from March 1966 until October 1968 and as a corporate director from October 1968 until December 1977.

De Korte served as the People's Party for Freedom and Democracy campaign manager for the elections of 1972 and 1977. De Korte became a Member of the House of Representatives after Hans Wiegel was appointed as Deputy Prime Minister and Minister of the Interior in the Cabinet Van Agt–Wiegel following the cabinet formation of 1977, taking office on 22 December 1977 serving as a frontbencher and spokesperson for Economic Affairs and Social Affairs. De Korte was appointed as Minister of the Interior in the Cabinet Lubbers I following the death of Koos Rietkerk, taking office on 12 March 1986. After the election of 1986 De Korte returned as a Member of the House of Representatives, taking office on 3 June 1986. After the Leader of the People's Party for Freedom and Democracy and Parliamentary leader of the People's Party for Freedom and Democracy in the House of Representatives Ed Nijpels announced he was stepping down as Leader and Parliamentary leader in the House of Representatives following the defeat in the election, the People's Party for Freedom and Democracy leadership approached De Korte as his successor, De Korte accepted and became the Leader of the People's Party for Freedom and Democracy, taking office on 9 July 1986. Following the cabinet formation of 1986 De Korte was appointed as Deputy Prime Minister and Minister of Economic Affairs in the Cabinet Lubbers II, taking office on 14 July 1986. On 15 December 1986 De Korte announced that he was stepping down as Leader in favor of Parliamentary leader in the House of Representatives Joris Voorhoeve. The Cabinet Lubbers II fell on 3 May 1989 following a disagreement in the coalition about the increase of tariffs and excises and continued to serve in a demissionary capacity. After the election of 1989 De Korte again returned as a Member of the House of Representatives, taking office on 14 September 1989. The Cabinet Lubbers II was replaced by the Cabinet Lubbers III following the cabinet formation of 1989 on 7 November 1989 and he continued to serve in the House of Representatives as a frontbencher and spokesperson for Economic Affairs and deputy spokesperson for Finances.

In August 1995 De Korte was nominated as a vice president of the European Investment Bank (EIB), and he resigned as Member of the House of Representatives the same day he was installed as vice president, serving from 1 September 1995 until 30 June 2000. De Korte served as Vice Chairman of the Supervisory board of the European Investment Bank from 1 September 2001 until 16 January 2012.

== Decorations ==
Honours
Ribbon bar	Honour	Country	Date	Comment
	Grand Officer of the Order of Leopold II	Belgium	30 December 1986	
	Grand Officer of the Order of the Oak Crown	Luxembourg	15 April 1988	
	Commander of the Order of Orange-Nassau	Netherlands	20 November 1989	
	Grand Cross of the Order of Merit	Portugal	5 May 1998	
	Grand Officer of the Legion of Honour	France	20 Augustus 2000	
	Knight Commander of the Order of Merit	Germany	1 February 2001	
	Commander of the Order of the Netherlands Lion	Netherlands	1 February 2012	

Party political offices
Preceded by Ed Nijpels	Leader of the People's Party for Freedom and Democracy; 1986	Succeeded by Joris Voorhoeve
Political offices
Preceded by Frits Korthals Altes; Ad interim	Minister of the Interior; 1986	Succeeded by Kees van Dijk
Preceded by Gijs van Aardenne	Deputy Prime Minister; 1986–1989	Succeeded by Wim Kok
Preceded by Gijs van Aardenne	Minister of Economic Affairs; 1986–1989	Succeeded by Koos Andriessen
Business positions
Preceded by Philippe Maystadt	Vice President of the European Investment Bank; 1995–2001	Succeeded by Werner Hoyer
