= Master of Business and Management =

Postgraduate business degree

A Masters in Business and Management (MBM) is a professional degree in "master in business" or "master in management" degrees, usually pursued by students immediately after completing a bachelor's degree (which distinguishes the MBM from the post-experience MBA degree, which usually requires at least three years of work experience). Common MBM variations include MSc Management and MSc International Management.

The MBM is open to graduates in all fields of the humanities, arts, engineering, science and business. It is designed to equip students with generalist managerial and leadership skills that will improve their practice and help them start a successful career in business management. The curriculum is also known as MSCom (Master of Science in commerce), though the teaching and learning styles may be different in order to account for the variations in prior work experience.

The Association of MBAs has been accrediting MBM degrees since 2005 and has accredited over 40 programs at international business schools.
