= Joris Voorhoeve =

Dutch politician and diplomat

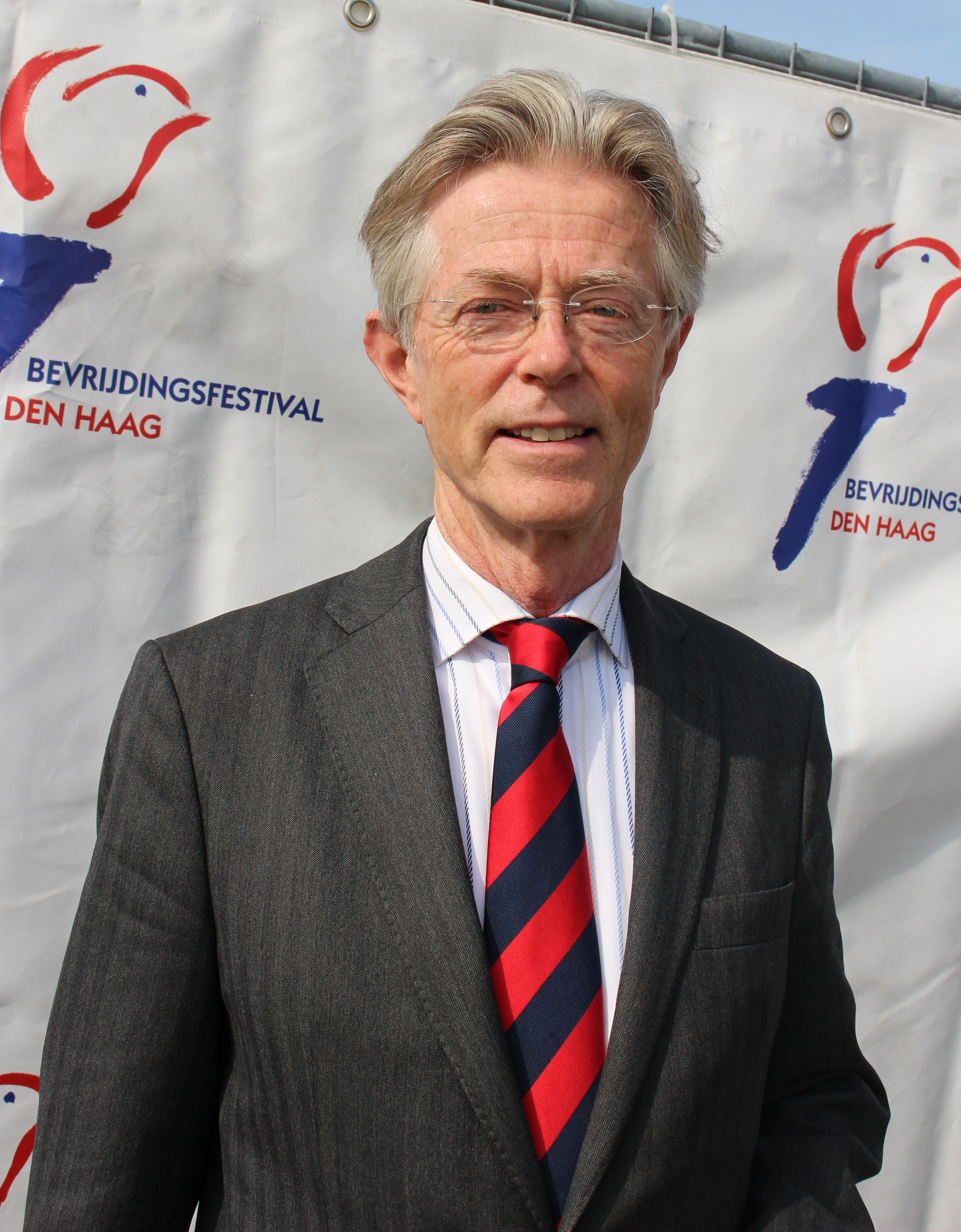
- Voorhoeve in 2014

Member of the Council of State^{[Status]}
- In office 1 December 1999 – 1 January 2011
- Vice President: Herman Tjeenk Willink

Minister of Defence
- In office 22 August 1994 – 3 August 1998
- Prime Minister: Wim Kok
- Preceded by: Relus ter Beek
- Succeeded by: Frank de Grave

Minister for Netherlands Antilles and Aruba Affairs
- In office 22 August 1994 – 3 August 1998
- Prime Minister: Wim Kok
- Preceded by: Ruud Lubbers
- Succeeded by: Bram Peper; Interior and Kingdom Relations

Leader of the People's Party for Freedom and Democracy
- In office 15 December 1986 – 30 April 1990
- Preceded by: Rudolf de Korte
- Succeeded by: Frits Bolkestein

Parliamentary leader in the House of Representatives
- In office 9 July 1986 – 30 April 1990
- Preceded by: Ed Nijpels
- Succeeded by: Frits Bolkestein
- Parliamentary group: People's Party for Freedom and Democracy

Member of the House of Representatives
- In office 19 May 1998 – 1 December 1999
- In office 16 September 1982 – 10 January 1991

Personal details
- Born: Joris Jacob Clemens Voorhoeve; 22 December 1945 (age 80) The Hague, Netherlands
- Party: Democrats 66 (from 2009)
- Other political affiliations: People's Party for Freedom and Democracy (1975–2010); Democrats 66 (1969–1971)
- Spouse: Judith Jaffe (m. 1976)
- Children: Alex Voorhoeve
- Education: Leiden University; Wageningen University; Paul H. Nitze School
- Occupation: Politician · Diplomat · Civil servant · Political scientist · Researcher · Nonprofit director · Lobbyist · Activist · Author · Professor

Joris Jacob Clemens Voorhoeve (born 22 December 1945) is a retired Dutch politician, diplomat of the People's Party for Freedom and Democracy (VVD) and political scientist.

== Biography ==
Voorhoeve studied Political science at the Leiden University obtaining a Master of Social Science degree and simultaneously studied Development economics and Civil engineering at the Wageningen University getting a Bachelor of Economics degree and obtaining a Master of Engineering degree, followed by a postgraduate education in International relations at the Paul H. Nitze School of Advanced International Studies obtaining a Master of Arts degree. Voorhoeve worked as a researcher at the Johns Hopkins University before finishing his thesis at his alma mater and graduated as a Doctor of Philosophy in Political science. Voorhoeve worked as a researcher at the World Bank in Washington, D.C. from April 1973 until January 1977 and for the Scientific Council for Government Policy from January 1977 until January 1979. Voorhoeve worked as a professor of International relations and Governmental studies at his alma mater in Wageningen from January 1979 until September 1982. Voorhoeve also served as the director of the Telders Foundation from May 1979 until September 1982.

After the election of 1982 Voorhoeve was elected as a Member of the House of Representatives on 16 September 1982 and served as a frontbencher and spokesperson for Foreign Affairs. Shortly after the election of 1986 Party Leader and Parliamentary leader Ed Nijpels stepped down and Voorhoeve announced his candidacy to succeed him and was selected Parliamentary leader on 9 July 1986 and not long after that was anonymously selected as Party Leader on 15 December 1986. For the election of 1989 Voorhoeve served as lead candidate but not long thereafter announced that he was stepping down on 30 April 1990 but continued to serve in the House of Representatives as a frontbencher chairing the House Committee on Defence and spokesperson for Development Cooperation and the Environment. In January 1991 Voorhoeve was nominated as the next executive director of the Clingendael Institute of International Relations and also worked as a professor of International relations and Governmental studies at the Clingendael Institute from January 1991 until August 1994. After the election of 1994 Voorhoeve was appointed as Minister of Defence and was given the portfolio of Netherlands Antilles and Aruba Affairs in the Cabinet Kok I taking office on 22 August 1994. As minister of defence, he was responsible for the deployment of Dutch UN peacekeepers (Dutchbat) during the period the Srebrenica massacre happened.

After the election of 1998 Voorhoeve wasn't offered a position in the new cabinet (which would later fall after a report of the Srebrenica massacre) and returned to the House of Representatives on 19 May 1998 serving again as frontbencher and spokesperson for Kingdom Relations. In November 1999 Voorhoeve was nominated as a Member of the Council of State serving from 1 December 1999 until 1 January 2011, and worked as a distinguished professor of International relations and War studies at the Royal Military Academy and the Royal Naval College from January 2001 until January 2011.

Voorhoeve retired from active politics at 65 and became active in the public sector as a non-profit director and served on several state commissions and councils on behalf of the government, and worked as a distinguished professor of Peace and conflict studies, International relations and Public administration at The Hague University and at his alma mater in Leiden from January 2011 until March 2018. Following his retirement Voorhoeve continued to be active as an advocate and activist for the Anti-war movement, Human rights, Poverty reduction and more European integration and as of 2026 continues to comment on political affairs.

== Early life ==
Voorhoeve attended the Gymnasium Haganum in The Hague from April 1958 until May 1964. Afterwards, he enrolled at The Hague University of Applied Sciences as an undergraduate from May 1964 until June 1968. Voorhoeve studied at Leiden University beginning in June 1968, majoring in Political science and obtaining a Bachelor of Social Science degree in September 1969 before graduating with a Master of Social Science degree in July 1971. At the same time, he attended Wageningen University from June 1968, majoring in Development economics and Civil engineering and eventually obtaining a Bachelor of Economics degree and a Bachelor of Engineering degree in June 1970 before graduating with a Master of Engineering degree in July 1971.

Voorhoeve later studied at the Paul H. Nitze School of Advanced International Studies of the Johns Hopkins University in Baltimore, Maryland from July 1971 for a postgraduate education in International relations while working as a student researcher before graduating with a Master of Arts degree in August 1972. After graduating from Johns Hopkins, he received his doctorate as a Doctor of Philosophy in Political Science in November 1973.

Voorhoeve worked as a political consultant for the World Bank in Washington, D.C. from April 1973 to January 1977 and soon after as a researcher for the Scientific Council for Government Policy from January 1977 to January 1979. Voorhoeve taught as a professor of Governmental Studies and International Relations at the Wageningen University from 1 January 1979 to 16 September 1982. Voorhoeve also worked as the executive director of the Telders Foundation from 10 May 1979 to 16 September 1982.

== Political career ==
=== House of Representatives (1982–1990) ===
Voorhoeve was elected as a Member of the House of Representatives after the election of 1982 and took office on 16 September 1982 serving as a frontbencher and spokesperson for the Ministry of Foreign Affairs. After the Leader of the People's Party for Freedom and Democracy Ed Nijpels announced he was stepping down after losing in the election of 1986, the People's Party for Freedom and Democracy leadership approached Voorhoeve as a candidate to succeed him.

Voorhoeve won against fellow frontbencher Loek Hermans and took office on 9 July 1986. In December 1986, the new Leader of the People's Party for Freedom and Democracy and incumbent Deputy Prime Minister Rudolf de Korte announced that he was stepping down as Leader in favor of Voorhoeve, who succeeded him on 15 December 1986. In the election of 1989, Voorhoeve was the lead candidate. The People's Party for Freedom and Democracy suffered a loss, losing 5 seats and had 22 seats in the House of Representatives. On 30 April 1990, Voorhoeve announced he was stepping down as Leader and Parliamentary leader. Voorhoeve assumed responsibility for the party's defeat in the election, but continued to serve in the House of Representatives as a frontbencher chairing the Parliamentary Committee for Defence.

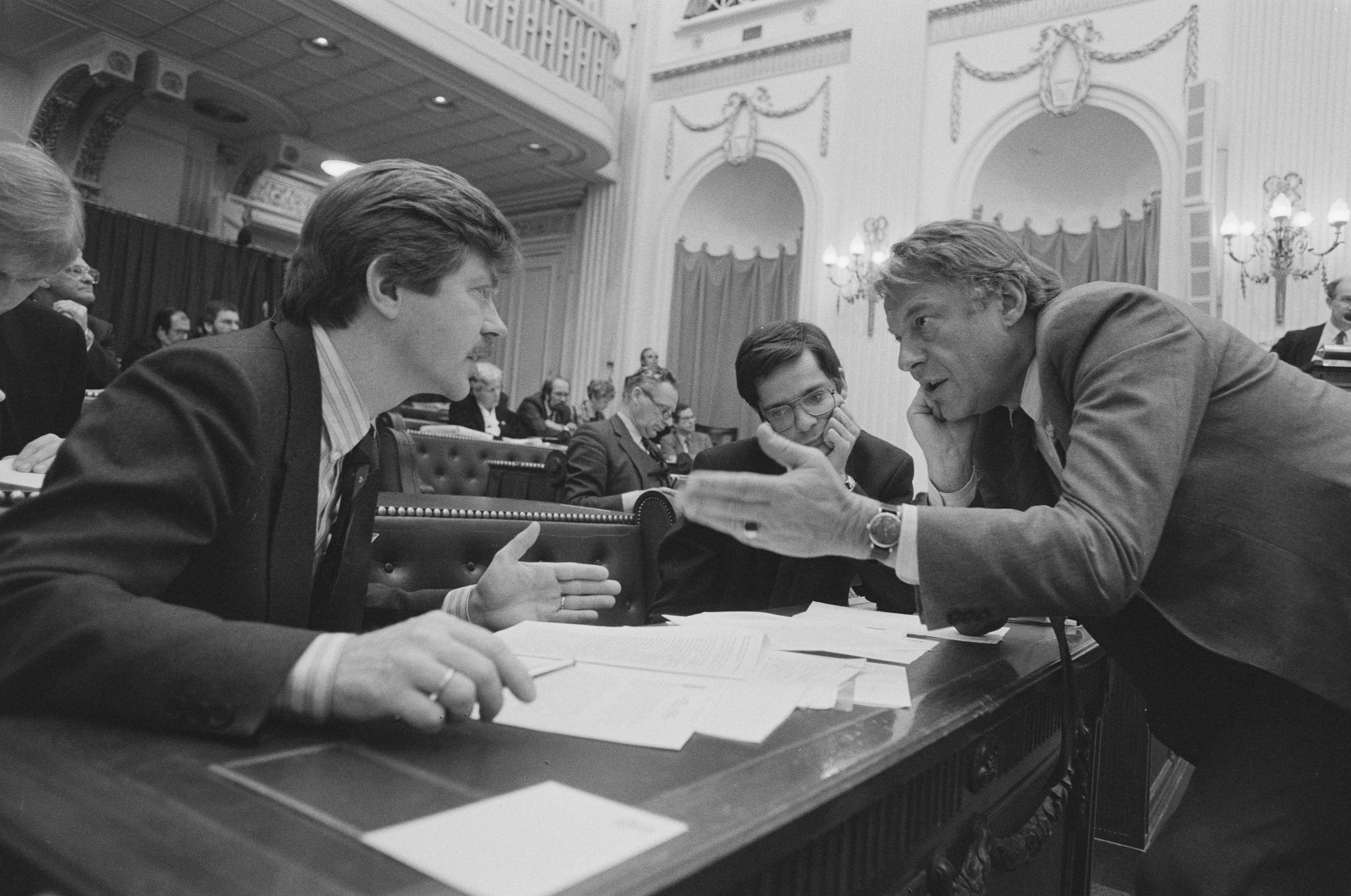
Party Leader Joris Voorhoeve, Frank de Grave and fellow Liberal Leader Hans van Mierlo in the House of Representatives on 11 June 1987.

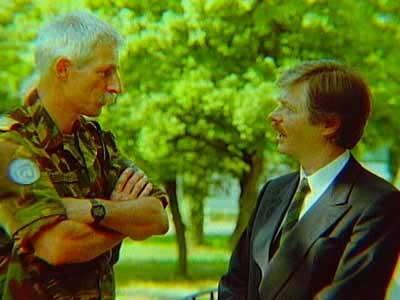
Commandant of Dutchbat Lieutenant colonel Thom Karremans and Minister Joris Voorhoeve in Zagreb days before the Srebrenica massacre in July 1995.

=== Bureaucrat (1990–1998) ===
In December 1990, Voorhoeve was nominated as executive director of the Institute of International Relations Clingendael and he resigned as a Member of the House of Representatives upon his appointment on 10 January 1991. Voorhoeve also served as a Distinguished Professor of Governmental studies and International relations at Leiden University from December 1990 until August 1994. After the election of 1994, Voorhoeve was appointed as the Minister of Defence and the Minister for Netherlands, Antilles, and Aruba Affairs in the Cabinet Kok I, taking office on 22 August 1994.

=== House of Representatives (1998–1999) ===
After the election of 1998, Voorhoeve returned as a Member of the House of Representatives and took office on 19 May 1998. Voorhoeve was not given a cabinet position in the cabinet formation of 1998, though he continued to serve in the House of Representatives as a frontbencher and spokesperson for Defence, Development Cooperation and Kingdom Relations.

=== Council of State (1999–2011) ===
In December 1999, Voorhoeve resigned as a Member of the House of Representatives after being nominated as a Member of the Council of State, which he assumed from 1 December 1999 to 1 January 2011.

== Post-political career ==
After retiring from politics, Voorhoeve became active in the public sector and occupied numerous seats as a corporate director and nonprofit director on supervisory boards of companies such as Oxfam, Trilateral Commission, Organisation for Scientific Research, Carnegie Foundation, Rutgers Nisso Group, Global Partnership for the Prevention of Armed Conflict, Institute for Multiparty Democracy, European Centre for Nature Conservation, International Institute of Social History, Institute of International Relations Clingendael and the Royal Academy of Arts and Sciences. Voorhoeve also served on several state commissions and councils on behalf of the government such as the Scientific Council for Government Policy, Advisory Commission for Asylum Affairs and the Advisory Council for Foreign Affairs as an advocate, lobbyist and activist for causes such as human rights, humanitarianism, social justice, poverty reduction, democracy, the anti-war movement, the anti-nuclear movement, and European integration. Voorhoeve also served as a distinguished professor of Governmental Studies and International Relations at the Leiden University from 30 January 2000 to 30 December 2015, as a distinguished professor of International Relations and War Studies at the Royal Military Academy and the Royal Naval College from 1 January 2001 to 1 January 2011, and as a distinguished professor of Peace and Conflict Studies, International Relations and Public administration at The Hague University of Applied Sciences from 14 January 2011 to 15 March 2018. Voorhoeve has also written more than a dozen books since 1979 about Politics, International relations, and Development Cooperation.

Voorhoeve continues to comment on political affairs as of 2019 and holds the distinction as the last serving Minister for Netherlands Antilles and Aruba Affairs.

== Decorations ==
Honours
Ribbon bar	Honour	Country	Date	Comment
	Grand Cross of the Order of Merit	Germany	4 April 1995	
	Grand Cross of the Order of Leopold II	Belgium	1 December 1995	
	Commander of the Order of the Oak Crown	Luxembourg	25 January 1996	
	Grand Officer of the Honorary Order of the Palm	Suriname	4 April 1996	
	Commander of the Legion of Honour	France	5 May 1997	
	Commander of the Order of Polonia Restituta	Poland	5 February 1998	
	Grand Officer of the Order of Orange-Nassau	Netherlands	1 January 2011	Elevated from Officer (30 October 1998)

== Personal life ==
Voorhoeve is married to the American Judith Jaffe whom he married in 1974 in Bethesda, Maryland. His son Alex Voorhoeve is a political philosopher at the London School of Economics and reviewed the dissertation of Saif Gaddafi, the son of Libya's former dictator Muammar Gaddafi.

Party political offices
Preceded by Ed Nijpels	Parliamentary leader of the People's Party for Freedom and Democracy in the House of Representatives; 1986–1990	Succeeded by Frits Bolkestein
Preceded by Rudolf de Korte	Leader of the People's Party for Freedom and Democracy; 1986–1990	Succeeded by Frits Bolkestein
Preceded by Ed Nijpels; 1989	Lead candidate of the People's Party for Freedom and Democracy; 1989	Succeeded by Frits Bolkestein; 1994
Political offices
Preceded by Ruud Lubbers	Minister for Netherlands; Antilles and Aruba Affairs; 1994–1998	Succeeded by Bram Peper as Minister of the Interior and Kingdom Relations
Preceded by Relus ter Beek	Minister of Defence; 1994–1998	Succeeded by Frank de Grave
Non-profit organization positions
Unknown	Executive Director of the Telders Foundation; 1979–1982	Unknown
Unknown	Executive Director of the Institute of International; Relations Clingendael; 1991–1994	Unknown
Preceded by Ella Vogelaar	Chairman of the Supervisory board of Oxfam Novib; 2007–2013	Succeeded by Hanzo van Beusekom
Preceded by Nitin Desai	Chairman of the Supervisory board of Oxfam; 2013–present	Incumbent
