= Leader of the People's Party for Freedom and Democracy =

Political position

- Logo of the VVD

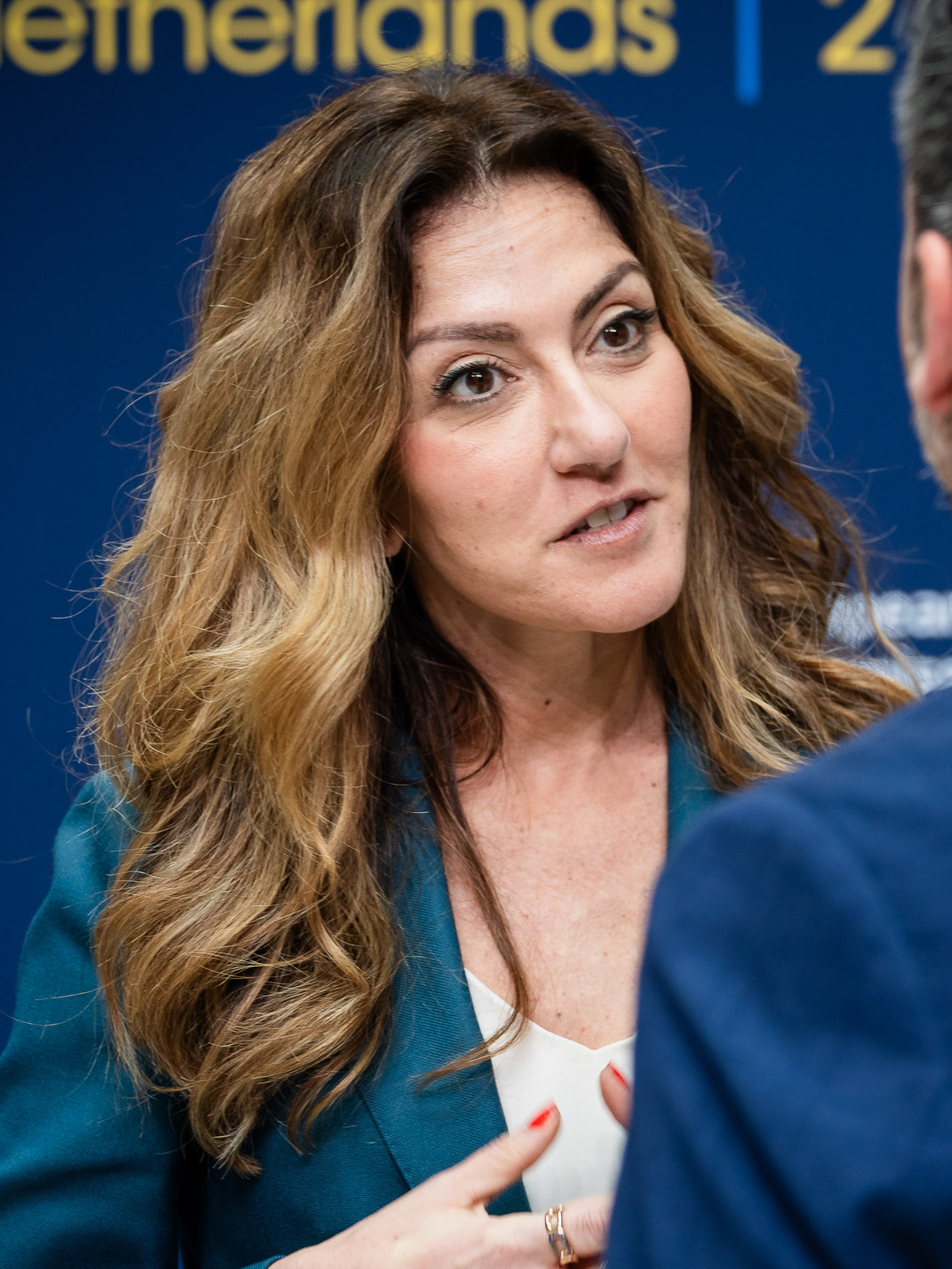
- Incumbent; Dilan Yeşilgöz-Zegerius since 14 August 2023
- People's Party for Freedom and Democracy
- Inaugural holder: Pieter Oud
- Formation: 15 May 1948

The leader of the People's Party for Freedom and Democracy is the most senior politician within the People's Party for Freedom and Democracy (VVD) in the Netherlands. The post is currently held by Dilan Yeşilgöz-Zegerius, who succeeded Mark Rutte in 2023.

== History ==
The Leaders outwardly act as the 'figurehead' and the main representative of the party. Within the party, they must ensure political consensus. At election time the leader is always the lead candidate of the VVD party list. Outside election time the leader can serve as the opposition leader. In the People's Party for Freedom and Democracy the Leader is often the parliamentary leader in the House of Representatives. If the VVD is part of the government, the leader usually becomes a senior minister in the cabinet.

== Leaders ==
Leader		Term of office	Positions	Lead candidate
Pieter Oud	Pieter Oud (1886–1968)	15 May 1948 – 12 January 1963 (14 years, 242 days)	Member of the House of Representatives (1917–1933, 1937–1938, 1948–1963); Minister of Finance (1933–1937); Leader of the Free-thinking Democratic League (1935–1938); Parliamentary leader in the House of Representatives (1937–1938, 1948–1963); Mayor of Rotterdam (1938–1941, 1945–1952)	1948; 1952; 1956; 1959
Edzo Toxopeus	Edzo Toxopeus (1918–2009)	12 January 1963 – 1 October 1969 (6 years, 262 days)	Member of the House of Representatives (1956–1959, 1963, 1965–1969); Minister of the Interior (1959–1965); Parliamentary leader in the House of Representatives (1963, 1966–1969); Queen's Commissioner of Groningen (1970–1980); Member of the Council of State (1980–1988)	1963; 1967
Molly Geertsema	Molly Geertsema (1918–1991)	1 October 1969 – 20 July 1971 (1 year, 292 days)	Member of the House of Representatives (1959–1971, 1973, 1973); Parliamentary leader in the House of Representatives (1963–1966, 1969–1971); Minister of the Interior (1971–1973); Deputy Prime Minister (1971–1973); Minister for Suriname and Netherlands Antilles Affairs (1973); Queen's Commissioner of Gelderland (1973–1983); Member of the Senate (1983–1987)	1971
Hans Wiegel	Hans Wiegel (1941–2025)	20 July 1971 – 20 April 1982 (10 years, 274 days)	Member of the House of Representatives (1967–1977, 1981–1982); Parliamentary leader in the House of Representatives (1971–1977, 1981–1982); Minister of the Interior (1977–1981); Deputy Prime Minister (1977–1981); Queen's Commissioner of Friesland (1982–1994); Member of the Senate (1995–2000)	1972; 1977; 1981
Ed Nijpels	Ed Nijpels (born 1950)	20 April 1982 – 27 June 1986 (4 years, 68 days)	Member of the House of Representatives (1977–1986, 1989–1990); Parliamentary leader in the House of Representatives (1982–1986); Minister of Housing, Spatial Planning and the Environment (1986–1989); Queen's Commissioner of Friesland (1999–2008)	1982; 1986
Rudolf de Korte	Rudolf de Korte (1936–2020)	27 June 1986 – 15 December 1986 (171 days)	Member of the House of Representatives (1977–1986, 1986, 1989–1995); Member of the House of Representatives (1986); Minister of Economic Affairs (1986–1989); Deputy Prime Minister (1986–1989)	None
Joris Voorhoeve	Joris Voorhoeve (born 1945)	15 December 1986 – 30 April 1990 (3 years, 136 days)	Member of the House of Representatives (1982–1991, 1998–1999); Parliamentary leader in the House of Representatives (1986–1990); Minister for Suriname and Netherlands Antilles Affairs (1994–1998); Minister of Defence (1994–1998); Member of the Council of State (1999–2011)	1989
Frits Bolkestein	Frits Bolkestein (1933–2025)	30 April 1990 – 30 July 1998 (8 years, 91 days)	Member of the House of Representatives (1978–1982, 1986–1988, 1989–1999); Parliamentary leader in the House of Representatives (1990–1998); State Secretary of Economic Affairs (1982–1986); Minister of Defence (1988–1989); European Commissioner (1999–2004)	1994; 1998
Hans Dijkstal	Hans Dijkstal (1943–2010)	30 July 1998 – 16 May 2002 (3 years, 290 days)	Member of the House of Representatives (1982–1986, 1986–1994, 1998–2002); Minister of the Interior (1994–1998); Deputy Prime Minister (1994–1998); Parliamentary leader in the House of Representatives (1998–2002)	2002
Gerrit Zalm	Gerrit Zalm (born 1952)	16 May 2002 – 27 November 2004 (2 years, 195 days)	Member of the House of Representatives (1998, 2002–2003); Minister of Finance (1994–1996, 1996–2002); Parliamentary leader in the House of Representatives (2002–2003); Minister of Finance (2003–2007); Deputy Prime Minister (2003–2007); Minister of Economic Affairs (2006)	2003
Jozias van Aartsen	Jozias van Aartsen (born 1947)	27 November 2004 – 8 March 2006 (1 year, 101 days)	Minister of Agriculture, Nature and Fisheries (1994–1998); Member of the House of Representatives (1998, 2002–2006); Minister of Foreign Affairs (1998–2002); Parliamentary leader in the House of Representatives (2003–2006); King's Commissioner of Drenthe (2017)	None
Vacant (8 March 2006 – 31 May 2006)
Mark Rutte	Mark Rutte (born 1967)	31 May 2006 – 14 August 2023 (17 years, 159 days)	State Secretary of Social Affairs and Employment (2002–2004); Member of the House of Representatives (2003, 2006–2010, 2012, 2017, 2021–2022); State Secretary for Education, Culture and Science (2004–2006); Parliamentary leader in the House of Representatives (2006–2010, 2012, 2017, 2021–2022); Prime Minister (2010–2024); Secretary General of NATO (since 2024)	2006; 2010; 2012; 2017; 2021
Dilan Yeşilgöz	Dilan Yeşilgöz (born 1977)	14 August 2023 – Incumbent (3 years, 24 days)	Member of the House of Representatives (2017–2021, since 2023); State Secretary of Economic Affairs and Climate Policy (2021–2022); Minister of Justice and Security (2022–2024); Parliamentary leader in the House of Representatives (2023-2026); First Deputy Prime Minister and Minister of Defence (since 2026)	2023; 2025
