= Leader of the Christian Democratic Appeal =

Christian Democratic Appeal

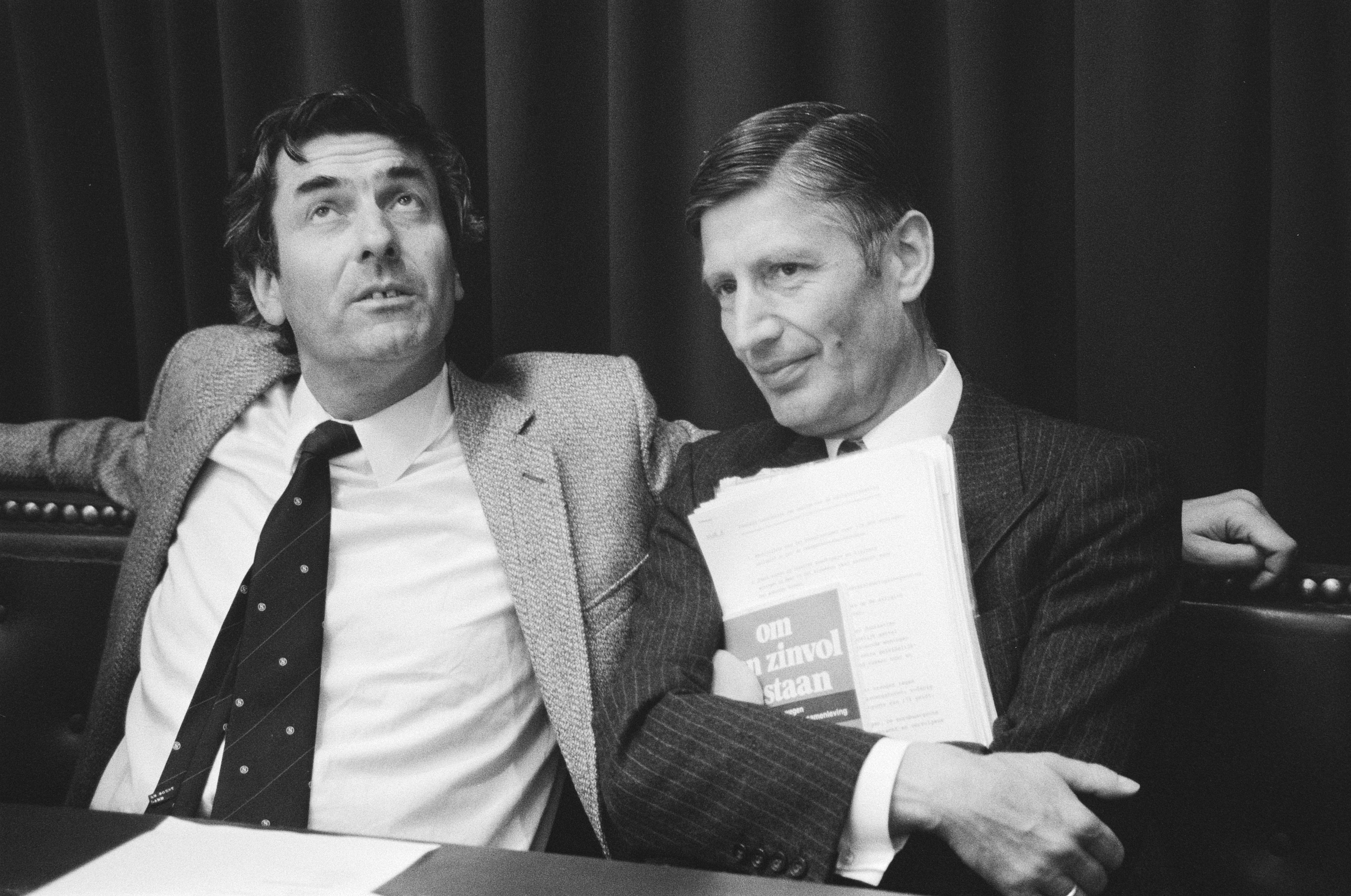
Future Leader Ruud Lubbers and incumbent leader Dries van Agt in the House of Representatives on 23 June 1981.

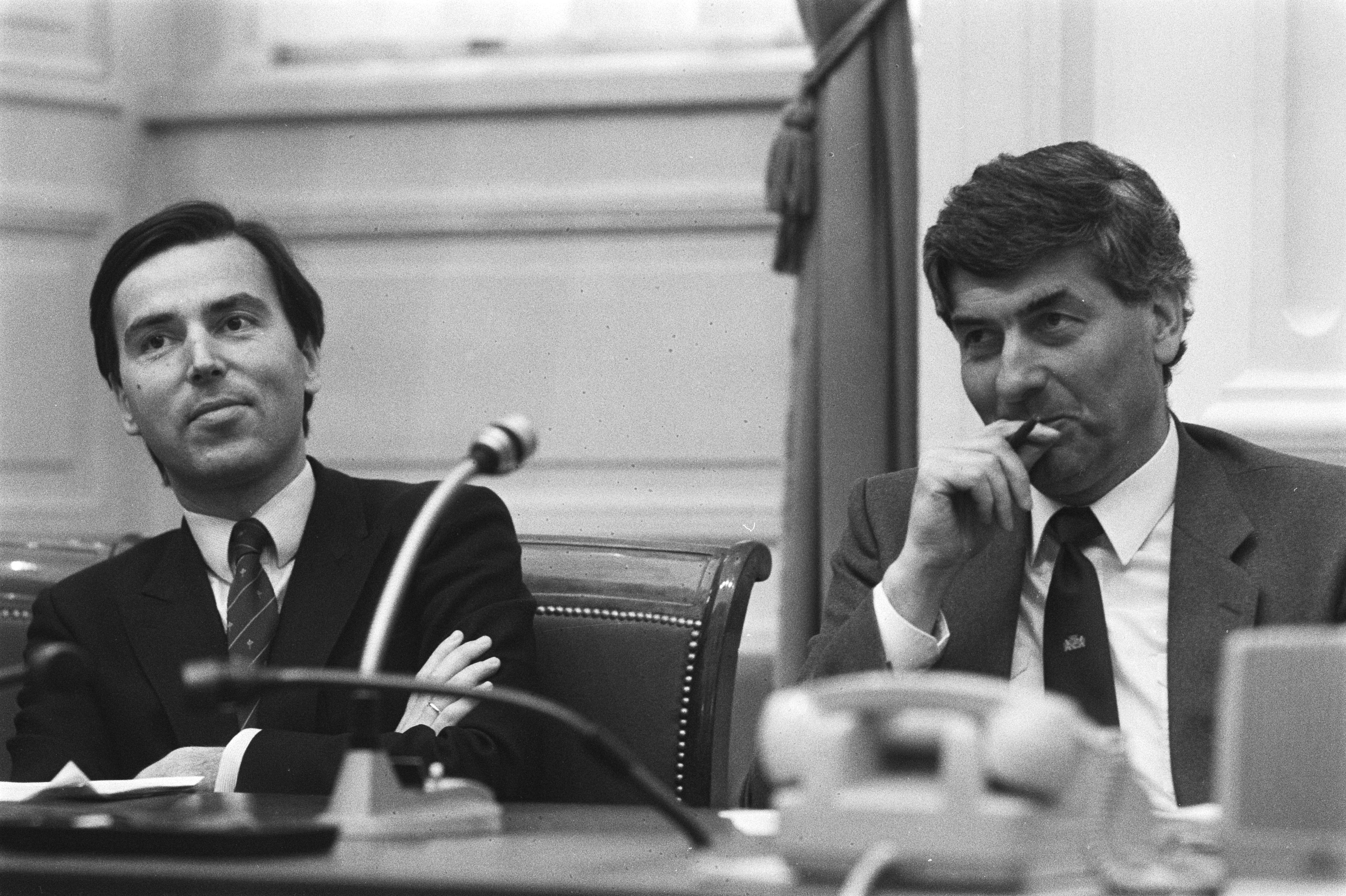
Future Leader Elco Brinkman and incumbent leader Ruud Lubbers in the House of Representatives on 3 May 1984.

The leader of the Christian Democratic Appeal is the most senior politician within the Christian Democratic Appeal (Dutch: Christen-Democratisch Appèl, CDA) in the Netherlands.The current leader has been Henri Bontenbal since 14 August 2023.

== History ==
The leaders outwardly act as the figurehead and the main representative of the party. Within the party, they must ensure political consensus. At election time the leader is always the lead candidate of the party list. Outside election time the officeholder can serve as the leader of the opposition. In the Christian Democratic Appeal the leader is often the parliamentary leader in the House of Representatives. Some Christian Democratic Appeal leaders became a Minister in a cabinet.

Leader		Term of office	Age as leader	Position(s)	Religion	Lead candidate
Dries van Agt	Dries van Agt (1931–2024)	11 December 1976 – 25 October 1982 (5 years, 318 days)	45–51	Minister of Justice (1971–1977); Member of the House of Representatives (1973, 1977, 1981, 1982–1983); Deputy Prime Minister (1973–1977); Parliamentary leader in the House of Representatives (1977, 1981); Prime Minister (1977–1982); Minister of Foreign Affairs (1982); Queen's Commissioner of North Brabant (1983–1987); Ambassador of the EU to Japan (1987–1990); Ambassador of the EU to the United States (1990–1995)	Catholic	1977; 1981; 1982
Ruud Lubbers	Ruud Lubbers (1939–2018)	25 October 1982 – 29 January 1994 (11 years, 96 days)	43–54	Minister of Economic Affairs (1973–1977); Member of the House of Representatives (1977, 1977–1982, 1986, 1989); Parliamentary leader in the House of Representatives (1978–1981, 1981–1982, 1986, 1989); Prime Minister (1982–1994); Minister for Netherlands Antilles and Aruba Affairs (1989, 1994); United Nations High Commissioner for Refugees (2001–2005); Minister of State (1995–2018) (Title of honor)	Catholic	1986; 1989
Elco Brinkman	Elco Brinkman (1948–2026)	29 January 1994 – 16 August 1994 (199 days)	45–46	Minister of Welfare, Health and Culture (1982–1986); Member of the House of Representatives (1986, 1989–1995); Parliamentary leader in the House of Representatives (1989–1994); Member of the Social and Economic Council (1995–2011); Member of the Senate (2011–2019); Parliamentary leader in the Senate (2011–2019)	Protestant (Gereformeerd)	1994
Enneüs Heerma	Enneüs Heerma (1944–1999)	16 August 1994 – 27 March 1997 (2 years, 254 days)	49–52	Member of the Municipal council of Amsterdam (1971–1986); Alderman of Amsterdam (1978–1986); State Secretary of Economic Affairs (1986); State Secretary of Housing, Spatial Planning and the Environment (1986–1994); Member of the House of Representatives (1989, 1994–1997); Parliamentary leader in the House of Representatives (1994–1997)	Protestant (Gereformeerd)	
Jaap de Hoop Scheffer	Jaap de Hoop Scheffer (born 1948)	27 March 1997 – 1 October 2001 (4 years, 157 days)	48–53	Member of the House of Representatives (1986–2002); Parliamentary leader in the House of Representatives (1997–2001); Minister of Foreign Affairs (2002–2003); Secretary General of NATO (2003–2009); Minister of State (since 2018) (Title of honor)	Catholic	1998
Jan Peter Balkenende	Jan Peter; Balkenende (born 1956)	1 October 2001 – 9 June 2010 (8 years, 251 days)	46–54	Member of the Municipal council of Amstelveen (1982–1998); Member of the House of Representatives (1998–2002, 2003, 2006–2007; Parliamentary leader in the House of Representatives (2001–2002, 2003, 2006–2007); Prime Minister (2002–2010); Minister of State (since 2022) (Title of honor)	Protestant (Gereformeerd)	2002; 2003; 2006; 2010
Maxime Verhagen	Maxime Verhagen (born 1956)	10 June 2010 – 30 June 2012 (2 years, 20 days)	53–55	Member of the Municipal council of Oegstgeest (1986–1990); Member of the European Parliament (1989–1994); Member of the House of Representatives (1994–2007, 2010); Parliamentary leader in the House of Representatives (2002–2003, 2003–2006, 2007, 2010); Minister of Foreign Affairs (2007–2010); Minister for Development Cooperation (2010); Minister of Economic Affairs, Agriculture and Innovation (2010–2012); Deputy Prime Minister (2010–2012); Member of the Social and Economic Council (2015–2023)	Catholic	
Sybrand van Haersma Buma	Sybrand van Haersma Buma (born 1965)	30 June 2012 – 22 May 2019 (6 years, 326 days)	46–53	Member of the Municipal council of Leidschendam-Voorburg (2002); Member of the House of Representatives (2002–2019); Parliamentary leader in the House of Representatives (2010–2019); Mayor of Leeuwarden (since 2019)	Protestant (Hervormd)	2012; 2017
Hugo de Jonge	Hugo de Jonge (born 1977)	15 July 2020 – 10 December 2020 (148 days)	42–43	Alderman of Rotterdam (2010–2017); Member of the Municipal council of Rotterdam (2014); Minister of Health, Welfare and Sport (2017–2022); Deputy Prime Minister (2017–2022); Minister for Housing and Spatial Planning (2022–2024); Minister of the Interior and Kingdom Relations (2023–2024); King's commissioner of Zeeland (since 2024)	Protestant (Hervormd)	
Wopke Hoekstra	Wopke Hoekstra (born 1975)	11 December 2020 – 14 August 2023 (2 years, 246 days)	45–47	Member of the Senate (2011–2017); Minister of Finance (2017–2022); Member of the House of Representatives (2021–2022); Parliamentary leader in the House of Representatives (2021–2022); Minister of Foreign Affairs (2022–2023); Deputy Prime Minister (2022–2023); European commissioner (since 2023)	Protestant (Remonstrant)	2021
Henri Bontenbal	Henri Bontenbal (born 1982)	14 August 2023 – Incumbent (3 years, 17 days)	40–43	Member of the House of Representatives (2021, 2021, since 2022); Parliamentary leader in the House of Representatives (since 2023)	Protestant (Gereformeerd)	2023; 2025
