= Gerrit Brokx =

Dutch politician (1933–2002)

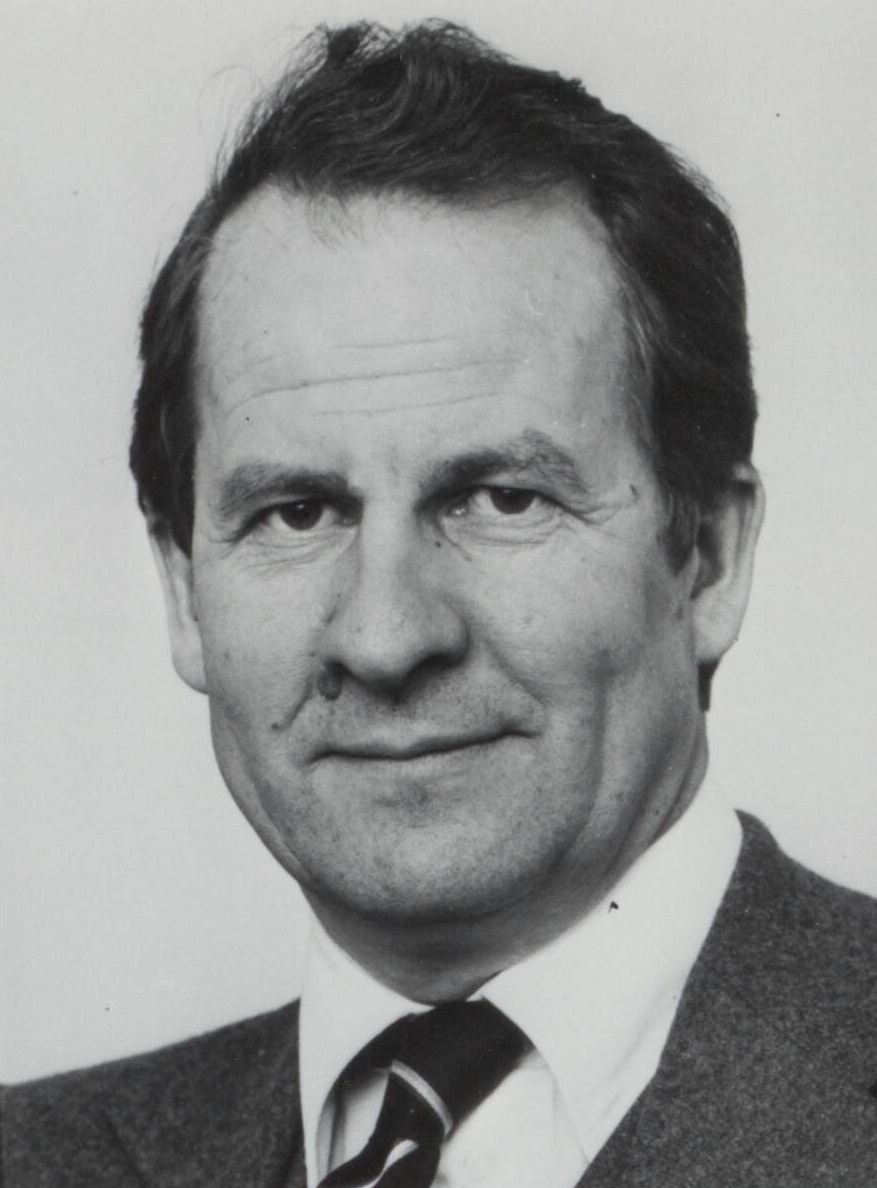
- Brokx in 1977

Mayor of Tilburg
- In office 16 May 1988 – 1 June 1997
- Preceded by: Wim Dijkstra (Ad interim)
- Succeeded by: Johan Stekelenburg

State Secretary for Housing, Spatial Planning and the Environment
- In office 5 November 1982 – 23 October 1986
- Prime Minister: Ruud Lubbers
- Preceded by: Siepie de Jong as State Secretary for Housing and Spatial Planning
- Succeeded by: Enneüs Heerma

Member of the House of Representatives
- In office 3 June 1986 – 14 July 1986
- In office 21 September 1982 – 5 November 1982
- In office 15 September 1981 – 16 September 1982
- In office 10 June 1981 – 9 September 1981

State Secretary for Housing and Spatial Planning
- In office 28 December 1977 – 11 September 1981
- Prime Minister: Dries van Agt
- Preceded by: Jan Schaefer; Marcel van Dam
- Succeeded by: Siepie de Jong

Personal details
- Born: Gerardus Philippus Brokx; 22 June 1933 Oosterhout, Netherlands
- Died: 11 January 2002 (aged 68) Tilburg, Netherlands
- Party: Christian Democratic Appeal (from 1980)
- Other political affiliations: Catholic People's Party (1963–1980)
- Spouse: Marjolein Uitzinger (m. 1988)
- Education: Utrecht University (Bachelor of Laws, Master of Laws)
- Occupation: Politician · Jurist · Corporate director · Nonprofit director · Sport administrator

Gerardus Philippus "Gerrit" Brokx (22 June 1933 – 11 January 2002) was a Dutch politician of the Christian Democratic Appeal (CDA).

== Decorations ==
Honours
Ribbon bar	Honour	Country	Date	Comment
	Knight of the Order of the Netherlands Lion	Netherlands	26 October 1981	
	Commander of the Order of Orange-Nassau	Netherlands	30 April 1988	

Political offices
Preceded by Jan Schaefer; Marcel van Dam	State Secretary for Housing and Spatial Planning; 1977–1981	Succeeded by Siepie de Jong
Preceded by Siepie de Jong as State Secretary for Housing and Spatial Planning	State Secretary for Housing, Spatial; Planning and the Environment; 1982–1986	Succeeded by Enneüs Heerma
Preceded by Wim Dijkstra; Ad interim	Mayor of Tilburg; 1988–1997	Succeeded by Johan Stekelenburg
