= Elco Brinkman =

Dutch politician (1948–2026)

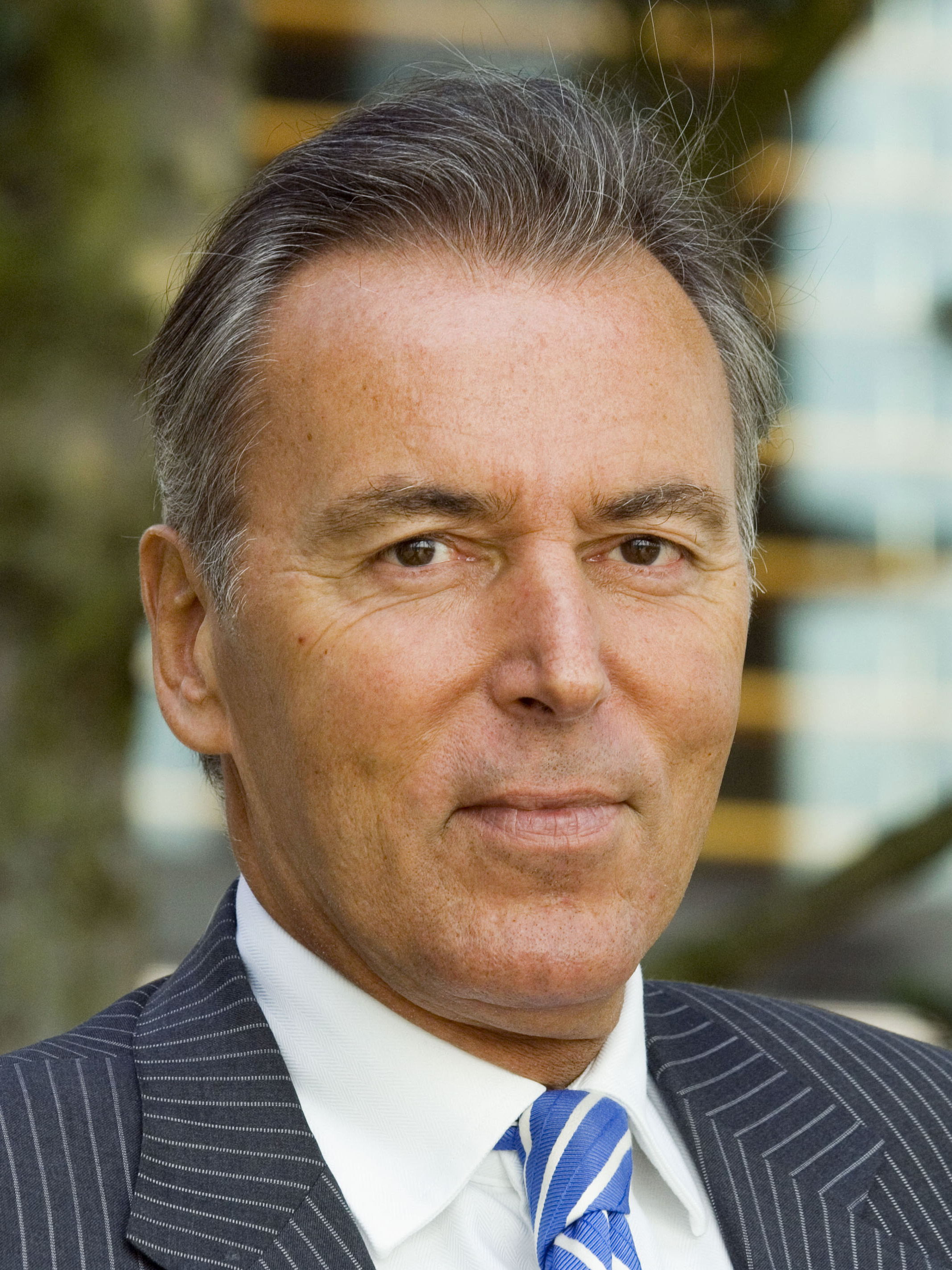
- Brinkman in 2008

Leader of the Christian Democratic Appeal in the Senate
- In office 7 June 2011 – 11 June 2019
- Preceded by: Jos Werner
- Succeeded by: Ben Knapen

Member of the Senate
- In office 7 June 2011 – 11 June 2019

Member of the Social and Economic Council
- In office 1 June 1995 – 1 July 2013
- Chairman: See list: Theo Quené (1995–1996) Klaas de Vries (1996–1998) Herman Wijffels (1999–2006) Alexander Rinnooy Kan (2006–2012) Wiebe Draijer (2012–2013)

Leader of the Christian Democratic Appeal
- In office 29 January 1994 – 16 August 1994
- Preceded by: Ruud Lubbers
- Succeeded by: Enneüs Heerma

Leader of the Christian Democratic Appeal in the House of Representatives
- In office 7 November 1989 – 16 August 1994
- Preceded by: Ruud Lubbers
- Succeeded by: Enneüs Heerma

Member of the House of Representatives
- In office 14 September 1989 – 26 April 1995
- In office 3 June 1986 – 14 July 1986

Minister of Welfare, Health and Culture
- In office 4 November 1982 – 7 November 1989
- Prime Minister: Ruud Lubbers
- Preceded by: Til Gardeniers-Berendsen; Health and Environment
- Succeeded by: Hedy d'Ancona

Personal details
- Born: Leendert Cornelis Brinkman; 5 February 1948 Dirksland, Netherlands
- Died: 31 August 2026 (aged 78) Leiden, Netherlands
- Party: Christian Democratic Appeal
- Spouse: Janneke Salentijn (m. 1977)
- Children: 3
- Education: Free University Amsterdam (BSocSc, LLB, MSocSc, LLM)
- Occupation: Politician; trade association executive; researcher; businessperson; corporate director; non-profit director; civil servant; jurist; lobbyist

Leendert Cornelis "Elco" Brinkman (5 February 1948 – 31 August 2026) was a Dutch politician and businessman who served as Minister of Welfare, Health and Culture from 1982 to 1989 and Leader of the Christian Democratic Appeal (CDA) in 1994.

== Life and career ==
Brinkman studied political science and law and at the Free University Amsterdam simultaneously obtaining a Master of Social Science and Laws degree. Brinkman worked as a researcher at his alma mater from September 1970 until July 1974 and as a civil servant for the Ministry of the Interior from July 1974 until November 1982. After the 1982 general election, Brinkman was appointed Minister of Welfare, Health and Culture in the First Lubbers cabinet taking office on 4 November 1982. After the election of 1986 Brinkman continued his office in the Second Lubbers cabinet. At the election of 1989 Brinkman was reelected as a member of the House of Representatives and took office on 14 September. He declined to serve in the new cabinet and instead was selected as parliamentary leader on 7 November 1989. Shortly before the 1994 Dutch general election, party leader and Prime Minister Ruud Lubbers announced his retirement and Brinkman was anonymously selected as his successor on 29 January 1994. For the election of 1994 Brinkman served as lijsttrekker (top candidate) but shortly thereafter announced that he was stepping down following disappointing election results on 16 August 1994 but continued to serve in the House of Representatives as a frontbencher chairing the House Committee on Kingdom Relations and spokesperson for Health. In April 1995 Brinkman unexpectedly announced his retirement and resigned from the House of Representatives on 26 April 1995.

He retired from active politics at just 47 and became active in the private and public sectors as a corporate and non-profit director and served on several state commissions and councils on behalf of the government; he worked as a trade association executive serving as Chairman of the Construction Association from May 1995 until July 2013, Vice Chairman of the Industry and Employers Confederation (VNO-NCW) from April 2002 until May 2008 and a Member of the Social and Economic Council for the VNO-NCW from June 1995 until July 2013. Brinkman returned to active in politics and after the Senate election of 2011 was elected as a member of the Senate and became parliamentary leader serving from 7 June 2011 until 11 June 2019. Brinkman retired from active politics a second time at 71. However, he continued to be active as an advocate and lobbyist for trade associations.

Brinkman died in Leiden on 31 August 2026, at the age of 78.

== Decorations ==
Honours
Ribbon bar	Honour	Country	Date
	Grand Officer of the Legion of Honour	France	6 February 1984
	Grand Cross of the Order of Leopold II	Belgium	10 September 1988
	Commander of the Order of Orange-Nassau	Netherlands	20 November 1989

Party political offices
Preceded by Ruud Lubbers	Parliamentary leader of the Christian Democratic Appeal in the House of Representatives; 1989–1994	Succeeded by Enneüs Heerma
Preceded by Ruud Lubbers	Leader of the Christian; Democratic Appeal; 1994	Succeeded by Enneüs Heerma
Preceded by Ruud Lubbers; 1989	Lijsttrekker of the Christian Democratic Appeal; 1994	Succeeded by Jaap de Hoop Scheffer; 1998
Preceded by Jos Werner	Parliamentary leader of the Christian Democratic Appeal in the Senate; 2011–2019	Succeeded by Ben Knapen
Political offices
Preceded by Til Gardeniers-Berendsen as Minister of Health and Environment	Minister of Welfare, Health and Culture; 1982–1989	Succeeded by Hedy d'Ancona
Preceded by Til Gardeniers-Berendsen as Minister of Culture, Recreation and Social Work; Ad interim	Minister of Welfare, Health and Culture; 1982–1989	Succeeded by Hedy d'Ancona
Civic offices
Unknown	Deputy Secretary-General of the Ministry of the Interior; 1979–1980	Unknown
Unknown	Director-General of the Department for Public Administration of the Ministry of the Interior; 1980–1982	Unknown
Preceded by Bert de Vries	Chairman of the Supervisory board of Public Pension Funds APB; 2001–2009	Succeeded by Harry Borghouts
Business positions
Preceded by Office established	Chairman of the Executive Board of the Construction association 1995–2013	Succeeded by Maxime Verhagen
Preceded by Hans de Boer	Vice Chairman of the Executive Board of the Industry and Employers confederation 2002–2008	Succeeded by Hans Wiegel
Non-profit organization positions
Preceded by Bram Peper	Chairman of the Supervisory board of the International Architecture; Biennal Rotterdam; 2001–2011	Succeeded by Ed Nijpels
Preceded by Wim Deetman	Chairman of the Supervisory board of the Royal Library; 2004–2015	Succeeded by Tjibbe Joustra
Preceded by Hans Wiegel	Chairman of the Supervisory board of Staatsbosbeheer; 2008–2010	Succeeded by Inge Brakman
