= Enneüs Heerma =

Dutch politician (1944–1999)

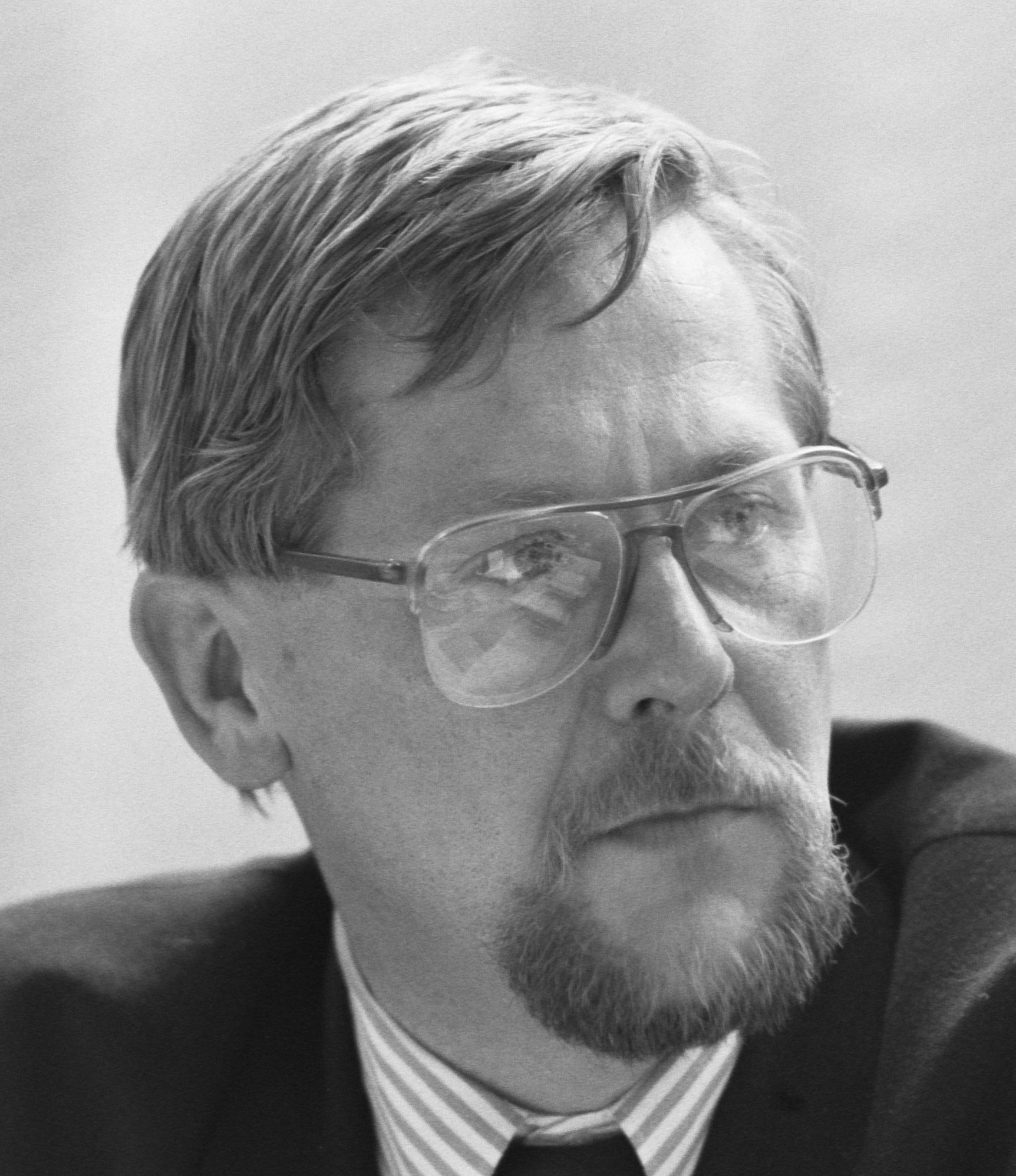
- Enneüs Heerma in 1988

Leader of the Christian Democratic Appeal
- In office 18 August 1994 – 27 March 1997
- Preceded by: Elco Brinkman
- Succeeded by: Jaap de Hoop Scheffer

Parliamentary leader in the House of Representatives
- In office 18 August 1994 – 27 March 1997
- Preceded by: Elco Brinkman
- Succeeded by: Jaap de Hoop Scheffer
- Parliamentary group: Christian Democratic Appeal

Member of the House of Representatives
- In office 17 May 1994 – 9 April 1997
- In office 14 September 1989 – 7 November 1989

State Secretary for Housing, Spatial Planning and the Environment
- In office 27 October 1986 – 22 August 1994
- Prime Minister: Ruud Lubbers
- Preceded by: Gerrit Brokx
- Succeeded by: Dick Tommel

State Secretary of Economic Affairs
- In office 17 July 1986 – 27 October 1986
- Prime Minister: Ruud Lubbers
- Preceded by: Frits Bolkestein
- Succeeded by: Yvonne van Rooy

Mayor of Amsterdam
- In office 1 June 1983 – 16 June 1983; Ad interim
- Preceded by: Wim Polak
- Succeeded by: Ed van Thijn

Personal details
- Born: Enneüs Heerma; 23 December 1944 Rijperkerk, Netherlands
- Died: 1 March 1999 (aged 54) Amsterdam, Netherlands
- Cause of death: Lung cancer
- Party: Christian Democratic Appeal (from 1980)
- Other political affiliations: Anti-Revolutionary Party (1967–1980)
- Spouse: Anke Govertine Vonkeman (m. 1968)
- Children: Pieter Heerma (born 1977); 1 other son and 1 daughter
- Education: Vrije Universiteit Amsterdam (Bachelor of Social Science, Master of Social Science)
- Occupation: Politician; Nonprofit director; Management consultant

Enneüs "Inne" Heerma (23 December 1944 – 1 March 1999) was a Dutch politician of the Christian Democratic Appeal (CDA) party and management consultant.

Heerma applied at the Vrije Universiteit Amsterdam in July 1963 majoring in Political science and obtaining a Bachelor of Social Science degree in June 1965 before graduating with a Master of Social Science degree in July 1970. Heerma worked as a management consultant in Amsterdam from January 1971 until September 1978. Heerma served on the municipal council of Amsterdam from March 1971 until July 1986 and served as an Alderman in Amsterdam from September 1978 until July 1986. Heerma served as acting Mayor of Amsterdam from 1 June 1983 until 16 June 1983 following the retirement of Wim Polak.

After the 1986 general election Heerma was appointed as State Secretary of Economic Affairs in the Lubbers II cabinet, taking office on 17 July 1986. Heerma was appointed as State Secretary of Housing, Spatial Planning and the Environment following the resignation of Gerrit Brokx, taking office on 27 October 1986. The Lubbers II cabinet fell on 3 May 1989 and continued to serve in a demissionary capacity. Heerma was elected to the House of Representatives in the 1989 general election, taking office on 14 September 1989. Following the 1989 cabinet formation, Heerma continued as State Secretary of Housing, Spatial Planning and the Environment in the Lubbers III cabinet, taking office on 7 November 1989. After the 1994 general election, Heerma returned to the House of Representatives, taking office on 17 May 1994. After the Leader of the Christian Democratic Appeal and parliamentary leader Elco Brinkman announced he was stepping down following the defeat in the election, the party leadership approached Heerma as his successor. Heerma accepted and became the party leader and parliamentary leader on 18 August 1994. The Lubbers III cabinet was replaced by the Kok I cabinet following the 1994 cabinet formation on 22 August 1994. On 27 March 1997, following increasing criticism of his performance as opposition leader, Heerma announced he was stepping down party leader and parliamentary leader, but retained his seat in the House of Representatives and continued to serve as a backbencher until his resignation on 9 April 1997.

Heerma remained in active politics, in October 1997 he was nominated as mayor of Hilversum but was diagnosed with terminal lung cancer the day before his official conformation, he died two years later at the age of 54.

Heerma was known for his abilities as a manager and a "policy wonk". He holds the distinction as the longest-serving State Secretary of Housing with 7 years, 299 days. His youngest son Pieter Heerma is also a politician and served as the parliamentary leader of the Christian Democratic Appeal in the House of Representatives, the same office Heerma himself held 22 years earlier.

== Decorations ==
Honours
Ribbon bar	Honour	Country	Date	Comment
	Commander of the Order of Merit	Germany	12 December 1988	
	Grand Officer of the Order of Leopold II	Belgium	30 January 1993	
	Commander of the Order of Orange-Nassau	Netherlands	8 October 1994	

== Bridge ==
In 2001, a 230 metres (750 ft) long road bridge, connecting the new residential neighbourhood of IJburg, built on seven man-made islands, to the Amsterdam mainland, was finished and name after Heerma: the Enneüs Heerma Bridge.

Party political offices
Preceded by Elco Brinkman	Leader of the Christian; Democratic Appeal; 1994–1997	Succeeded by Jaap de Hoop Scheffer
Preceded by Elco Brinkman	Parliamentary leader of the Christian Democratic Appeal in the House of Representatives; 1994–1997	Succeeded by Jaap de Hoop Scheffer
Political offices
Preceded by Wim Polak	Mayor of Amsterdam; Ad interim 1983	Succeeded by Ed van Thijn
Preceded by Frits Bolkestein	State Secretary of Economic Affairs; 1986	Succeeded by Yvonne van Rooy
Preceded by Gerrit Brokx	State Secretary of Housing, Spatial; Planning and the Environment; 1986–1994	Succeeded by Dick Tommel
