= Dick Tommel =

Dutch politician (1942–2023)

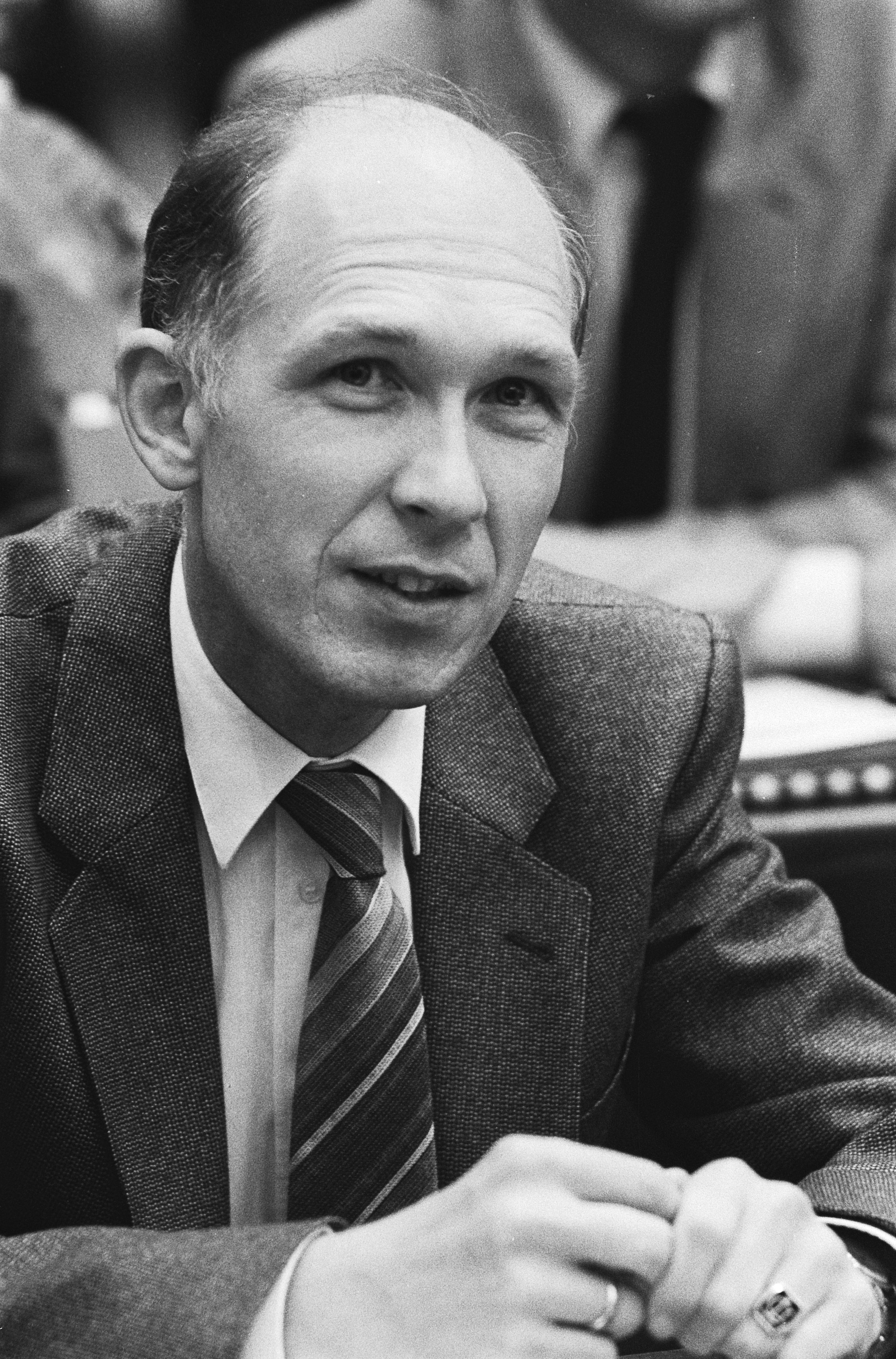
- Dick Tommel in 1983

State Secretary for Housing, Spatial Planning and the Environment
- In office 22 August 1994 – 3 August 1998
- Prime Minister: Wim Kok
- Preceded by: Enneüs Heerma
- Succeeded by: Johan Remkes

Member of the House of Representatives
- In office 30 August 1983 – 22 August 1994
- In office 10 June 181 – 16 September 1983
- Parliamentary group: Democrats 66

Personal details
- Born: Michael Henricus Maria van Hulten; 18 April 1942 Amersfoort, Netherlands
- Died: 13 December 2023 (aged 81) Utrecht, Netherlands
- Party: Democrats 66
- Education: Utrecht University (Bachelor of Science, Master of Mathematics, Doctor of Philosophy)
- Occupation: Politician; Civil servant; Nonprofit director; Lobbyist; Researcher; Mathematician; Chemist; Teacher

Dirk Krijn Johannes "Dick" Tommel (18 April 1942 – 13 December 2023) was a Dutch politician of Democrats 66 (D66).

Tommel was a member of the House of Representatives from 1981 to 1983 and from 1983 until 1994 and State Secretary for Housing, Spatial Planning and the Environment from 1994 to 1998. He died on 13 December 2023, at the age of 81.

== Sources ==
- (in Dutch) Parlement.com biography
