= Elanor Boekholt-O'Sullivan =

Irish-Dutch politician and former military officer (born 1976)

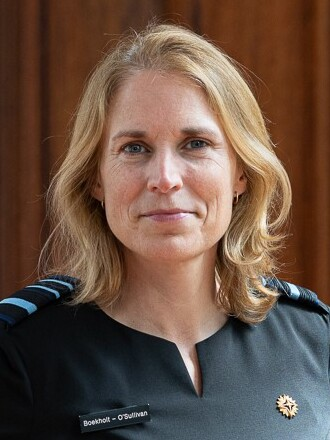
- Boekholt-O'Sullivan in 2024

Minister of Housing and Spatial Planning
- Incumbent
- Assumed office 23 February 2026
- Cabinet: Jetten
- Preceded by: Mona Keijzer

Deputy Commander of the Royal Netherlands Air Force
- In office 1 October 2020 – 1 June 2022
- Commander: Dennis Luyt
- Preceded by: Eric Schevenhoven
- Succeeded by: Dick van Ingen

Personal details
- Born: Elanor O'Sullivan; 23 February 1976 (age 50) Cork, Ireland
- Citizenship: Ireland; Netherlands
- Party: Democrats 66 (since 2026)
- Spouse: Harold Boekholt
- Children: 2
- Education: Koninklijke Militaire Academie

Military service
- Allegiance: Kingdom of the Netherlands
- Branch/service: Royal Netherlands Air and Space Force
- Years of service: 1996–present
- Rank: Lieutenant general

Elanor Boekholt-O'Sullivan (born 23 February 1976) is an Irish-Dutch politician of the Democrats 66 (D66) and former military officer of the Royal Netherlands Air Force. Since 23 February 2026, she has served as minister of Housing and Spatial Planning in the Jetten cabinet. Boekholt-O'Sullivan previously served as commander of the Defence Cyber Command from 2018 to 2020, as deputy commander of the Royal Netherlands Air Force from 2020 to 2022, and as deputy director-general at the Ministry of Defence from 2022 to 2026.

== Early life ==
Elanor O'Sullivan was born in Cork, Ireland to an Irish father and a Dutch mother. When she was two years old, following her parents' divorce, she moved with her mother and two older brothers to Culemborg, Netherlands.

== Career ==
=== Military career ===
From 1996 to 1998, Boekholt-O'Sullivan trained as an Air Force officer at the Koninklijke Militaire Academie. After graduating, she served in several roles, including positions at the Defence Intelligence and Security Service, as a platoon commander at the Netherlands Defence Academy, and as a staff officer to the deputy commander of the Royal Netherlands Air Force. At the end of 2007, Boekholt-O'Sullivan was deployed to Afghanistan for five months. There, she worked as a project leader for the reconstruction of the country's civil aviation infrastructure.

Between 2008 and 2010, she commanded the training squadron at Woensdrecht Air Base. In 2010, she left the squadron to attend the Higher Defence Education programme at the Netherlands Defence Academy. After completing this program, she joined the Defence IT organisation (JIVC) as a staff member. In 2012, Boekholt-O'Sullivan became strategic adviser to the commander of the Royal Netherlands Air Force, holding the rank of lieutenant colonel. Two years later, she was appointed head of AIR – the Air Force's innovation centre in Breda.

In June 2016, Boekholt-O'Sullivan became commander of Eindhoven Air Base with the rank of colonel. Her appointment was notable: she was the first woman to command a Dutch air base and only the second non-pilot ever to hold such a position. Her responsibilities included strategic and tactical air transport, aerial refueling operations, and the execution of coast guard duties.

In 2018, she handed over command of Eindhoven Air Base to her husband, Harold Boekholt. His appointment drew attention because she left behind several controversial dossiers, including issues involving the transport of hazardous materials, a whistleblower case concerning flight safety, and a matter related to financial integrity. There was concern that her husband might later have to judge her actions in these cases, potentially placing him in a difficult position.

On 1 July 2018, at age 42, Boekholt-O'Sullivan was promoted to commodore. Four days later, she succeeded Hans Folmer as commander of the Defence Cyber Command. In this role, she became responsible for the Netherlands' digital defence, including cyber operations involving intelligence gathering and offensive capabilities. At the time of her promotion, the Netherlands Armed Forces had only one other female air officer, Madelein Spit.

Boekholt-O'Sullivan was promoted again in 2020, becoming a major general and serving as deputy commander of the Royal Netherlands Air Force. In May 2022, she was promoted to lieutenant general, becoming the first woman in Dutch military history to hold this rank. She assumed the role of deputy director-general of the Directorate-General for Policy within the Ministry of Defence.

=== Political career ===
On 9 February 2026, it was announced that the Democrats 66 (D66) had nominated Boekholt-O'Sullivan for the position of minister for Housing and Spatial Planning in the incoming Jetten cabinet. She was installed on 23 February 2026, succeeding Mona Keijzer.

== Personal life ==
Elanor O'Sullivan is married to Harold Boekholt, who has also served in the Royal Netherlands Air Force as a major general. They have two children.

== Honours and awards ==
| Ribbon | Description |
|---|---|
| | Commemorative Medal Peacekeeping Operations |
| | Cross for Long Service as an Officer |
| | NATO Non-Article 5 Medal |

Political offices
| Preceded by Mona Keijzer | Minister of Housing and Spatial Planning; 2026–present | Incumbent |
