= Alessandro Minuto-Rizzo =

Italian diplomat

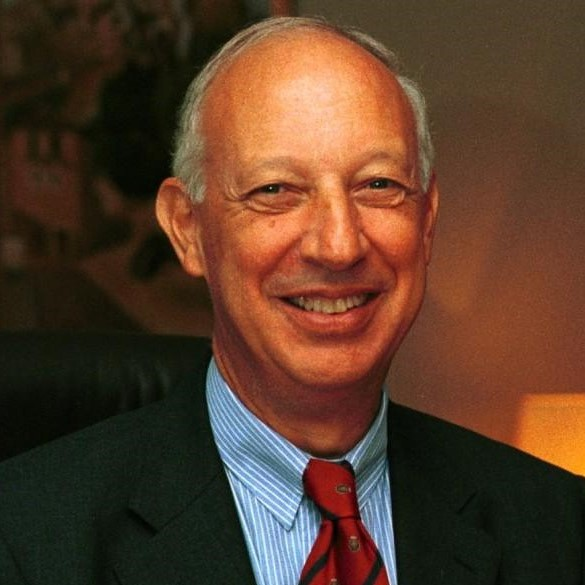

Secretary General of NATO Acting
- In office 17 December 2003 – 1 January 2004
- Preceded by: The Lord Robertson of Port Ellen
- Succeeded by: Jaap de Hoop Scheffer

Personal details
- Born: 10 September 1940 (age 84); Rome, Italy

Alessandro Minuto-Rizzo (born 10 September 1940) is an Italian diplomat who served as Deputy Secretary General of NATO from 2001 to 2007, and as acting Secretary General of NATO from 17 December 2003 to 1 January 2004, in between the tenures of The Lord Robertson of Port Ellen and Jaap de Hoop Scheffer. Prior to being appointed Deputy Secretary General, he served as ambassador of Italy to the Western European Union and to the Committee for Policy and Security of the European Union. He is a member of the Italy-USA Foundation.
