= Siepie de Jong =

Dutch politician

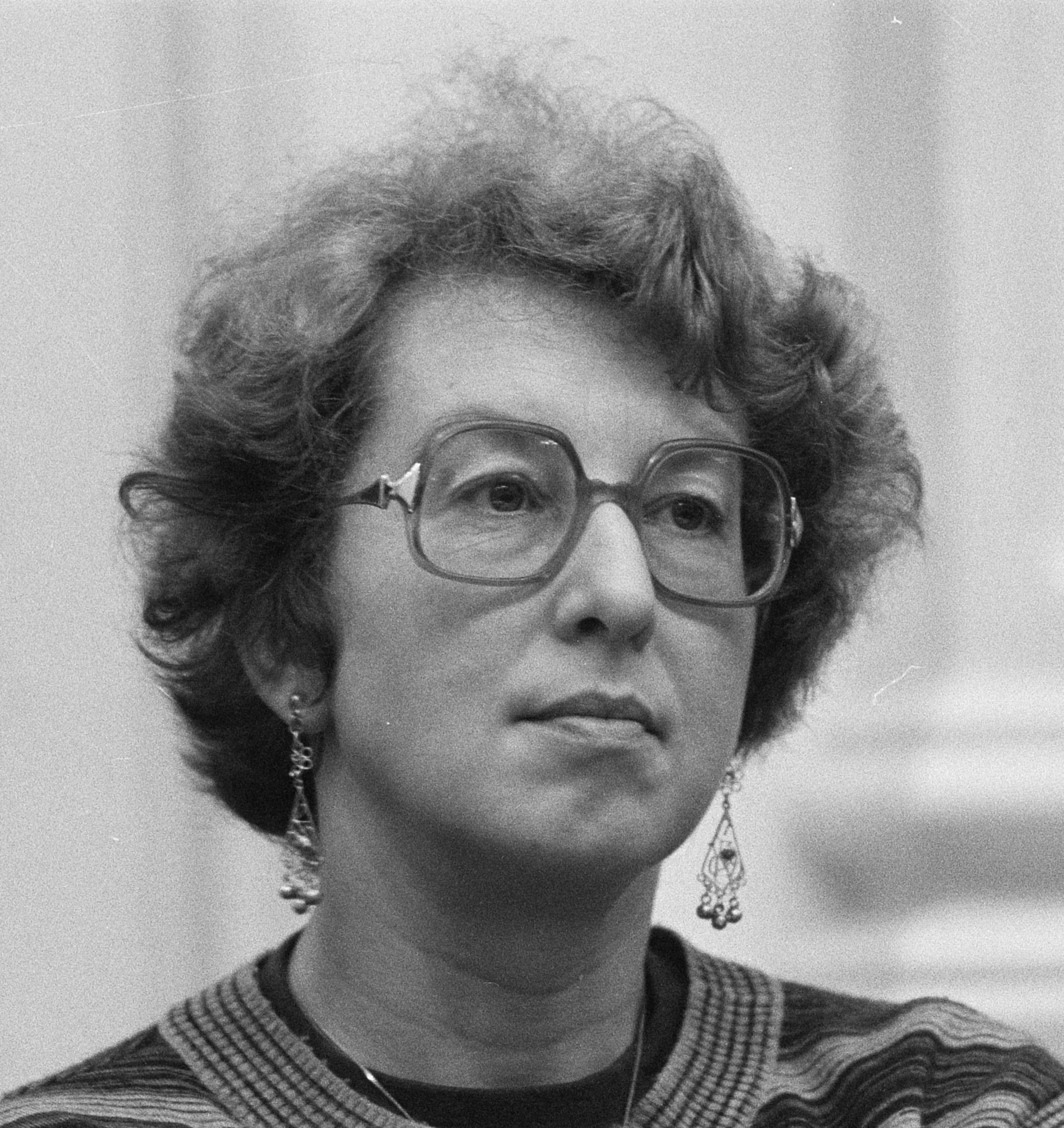
- De Jong in 1982

Mayor of Beek
- In office 1 June 1984 – 1 September 2005
- Preceded by: Theun Zwart
- Succeeded by: Siepie de Jong (ad interim)

State Secretary for Housing and Spatial Planning
- In office 11 September 1981 – 29 May 1982
- Prime Minister: Dries van Agt
- Minister: Marcel van Dam
- Preceded by: Gerrit Brokx
- Succeeded by: –

Member of the House of Representatives
- In office 28 May 1973 – 9 June 1981

Personal details
- Born: Sijbrigje de Jong; 28 August 1940 Breda, Netherlands
- Party: Labour Party (PvdA)
- Occupation: Politician, mayor

Sijbrigje (Siepie) de Jong (born 28 August 1940), also known by her married name Siepie Langedijk-de Jong, is a former Dutch politician for the Labour Party (PvdA).

Political offices
Preceded by Gerrit Brokx	State Secretary for Housing and Spatial Planning; 1981–1982	Succeeded by –
Preceded by Theun Zwart	Mayor of Beek; 1984–2005	Succeeded by Siepie de Jong; Ad interim
