= List of ministers of housing of the Netherlands =

Minister of Housing and Spatial Planning of the Netherlands
- Minister van Volkshuisvesting en Ruimtelijke Ordening
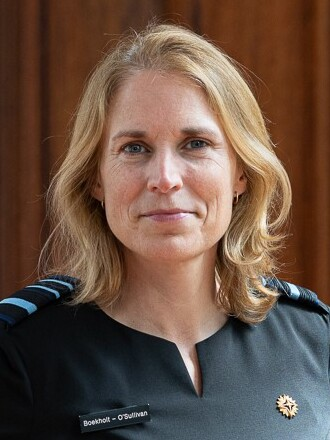
- Incumbent; Elanor Boekholt-O'Sullivan since 23 February 2026; 6 months ago
- Ministry of the Interior and Kingdom Relations
- Style: His/Her Excellency
- Member of: Council of Ministers
- Appointer: The monarch on advice of the prime minister
- First holder: Johan Ringers as Minister of Public Works and Reconstruction; 25 June 1945; 81 years ago
- Salary: €205,991 (As of 2025)

The Netherlands has had a dedicated minister responsible for housing policy since 1945. From 2024, the officeholder has held the official title minister of Housing and Spatial Planning (Dutch: minister van Volkshuisvesting en Ruimtelijke Ordening). The current minister, Elanor Boekholt-O'Sullivan, has served since 23 February 2026.

== List of ministers of housing ==
Cabinet	Minister			Term of office		Title
Cabinet	Image	Name	Party	Start	End	Title
Schermerhorn	Johan Ringers	Johan Ringers	Indep.	25 June 1945	15 November 1946	Minister of Public Works and Reconstruction
Beel I	Johan Ringers	Johan Ringers	Indep.	25 June 1945	15 November 1946	Minister of Public Works and Reconstruction
Beel I	Hein Vos	Hein Vos (ad interim)	PvdA	15 November 1946	3 March 1947	Minister of Public Works and Reconstruction
Beel I	Lambertus Neher	Lambertus Neher	PvdA	3 March 1947	1 March 1948	Minister of Reconstruction and Housing
Beel I	Joris in 't Veld	Joris in 't Veld	PvdA	1 March 1948	2 September 1952	Minister of Reconstruction and Housing
Drees I	Joris in 't Veld	Joris in 't Veld	PvdA	1 March 1948	2 September 1952	Minister of Reconstruction and Housing
Drees II	Joris in 't Veld	Joris in 't Veld	PvdA	1 March 1948	2 September 1952	Minister of Reconstruction and Housing
Drees III	Herman Witte	Herman Witte	KVP	2 September 1952	13 October 1956	Minister of Reconstruction and Housing
Drees IV	Herman Witte	Herman Witte	KVP	13 October 1956	19 May 1959	Minister of Housing and the Construction Industry
Beel II	Herman Witte	Herman Witte	KVP	13 October 1956	19 May 1959	Minister of Housing and the Construction Industry
De Quay	Jan van Aartsen	Jan van Aartsen	ARP	19 May 1959	24 July 1963	Minister of Housing and the Construction Industry
Marijnen	Pieter Bogaers	Pieter Bogaers	KVP	24 July 1963	14 April 1965	Minister of Housing and the Construction Industry
Cals	Pieter Bogaers	Pieter Bogaers	KVP	14 April 1965	22 November 1966	Minister of Housing and Spatial Planning
Zijlstra	Herman Witte	Herman Witte	KVP	22 November 1966	5 April 1967	Minister of Housing and Spatial Planning
De Jong	Wim Schut	Wim Schut	ARP	5 April 1967	6 July 1971	Minister of Housing and Spatial Planning
Biesheuvel I	Bé Udink	Bé Udink	CHU	6 July 1971	11 May 1973	Minister of Housing and Spatial Planning
Biesheuvel II	Bé Udink	Bé Udink	CHU	6 July 1971	11 May 1973	Minister of Housing and Spatial Planning
Den Uyl	Hans Gruijters	Hans Gruijters	D66	11 May 1973	19 December 1977	Minister of Housing and Spatial Planning
Van Agt I	Pieter Beelaerts van Blokland	Pieter Beelaerts van Blokland	CHU	19 December 1977	1 September 1981	Minister of Housing and Spatial Planning
Van Agt I	Pieter Beelaerts van Blokland	Pieter Beelaerts van Blokland	CDA	19 December 1977	1 September 1981	Minister of Housing and Spatial Planning
Van Agt I	Dany Tuijnman	Dany Tuijnman (ad interim)	VVD	1 September 1981	11 September 1981	Minister of Housing and Spatial Planning
Van Agt II	Marcel van Dam	Marcel van Dam	PvdA	11 September 1981	29 May 1982	Minister of Housing and Spatial Planning
Van Agt III	Erwin Nypels	Erwin Nypels	D66	29 May 1982	4 November 1982	Minister of Housing and Spatial Planning
Lubbers I	Pieter Winsemius	Pieter Winsemius	VVD	4 November 1982	14 July 1986	Minister of Housing, Spatial Planning and the Environment
Lubbers II	Ed Nijpels	Ed Nijpels	VVD	14 July 1986	7 November 1989	Minister of Housing, Spatial Planning and the Environment
Lubbers III	Hans Alders	Hans Alders	PvdA	7 November 1989	22 August 1994	Minister of Housing, Spatial Planning and the Environment
Kok I	Margreeth de Boer	Margreeth de Boer	PvdA	22 August 1994	3 August 1998	Minister of Housing, Spatial Planning and the Environment
Kok II	Jan Pronk	Jan Pronk	PvdA	3 August 1998	22 July 2002	Minister of Housing, Spatial Planning and the Environment
Balkenende I	Henk Kamp	Henk Kamp	VVD	22 July 2002	27 May 2003	Minister of Housing, Spatial Planning and the Environment
Balkenende II	Sybilla Dekker	Sybilla Dekker	VVD	27 May 2003	21 September 2006	Minister of Housing, Spatial Planning and the Environment
Balkenende III	Sybilla Dekker	Sybilla Dekker	VVD	27 May 2003	21 September 2006	Minister of Housing, Spatial Planning and the Environment
Balkenende III	Karla Peijs	Karla Peijs (ad interim)	CDA	21 September 2006	26 September 2006	Minister of Housing, Spatial Planning and the Environment
Balkenende III	Pieter Winsemius	Pieter Winsemius	VVD	26 September 2006	22 February 2007	Minister of Housing, Spatial Planning and the Environment
Balkenende IV	Jacqueline Cramer	Jacqueline Cramer	PvdA	22 February 2007	23 February 2010	Minister of Housing, Spatial Planning and the Environment
Balkenende IV	Tineke Huizinga	Tineke Huizinga	CU	23 February 2010	14 October 2010	Minister of Housing, Spatial Planning and the Environment
Balkenende IV	Ella Vogelaar	Ella Vogelaar	PvdA	22 February 2007	14 November 2008	Minister for Housing, Communities and Integration (Note: Minister without portfolio within the Ministry of Housing, Spatial Planning and the Environment.)
Balkenende IV	Eberhard van der Laan	Eberhard van der Laan	PvdA	14 November 2008	23 February 2010	Minister for Housing, Communities and Integration
Balkenende IV	Eimert van Middelkoop	Eimert van Middelkoop	CU	23 February 2010	14 October 2010	Minister for Housing, Communities and Integration
Rutte II	Stef Blok	Stef Blok	VVD	5 November 2012	27 January 2017	Minister for Housing and the Central Government Sector (Note: Minister without portfolio within the Ministry of the Interior and Kingdom Relations.)
Rutte III	Stientje van Veldhoven	Stientje van Veldhoven (acting)	D66	1 November 2019	14 April 2020	Minister for the Environment and Housing
Rutte IV	Hugo de Jonge	Hugo de Jonge	CDA	10 January 2022	5 September 2023	Minister for Housing and Spatial Planning
Schoof	Mona Keijzer	Mona Keijzer	BBB	2 July 2024	23 February 2026	Minister of Housing and Spatial Planning
Jetten	Elanor Boekholt-O'Sullivan	Elanor Boekholt-O'Sullivan	D66	23 February 2026	Incumbent	Minister of Housing and Spatial Planning

== List of state secretaries for housing ==
The position of state secretary for housing was created by the first Biesheuvel cabinet. The portfolios of state secretaries for housing have included public housing, spatial planning, urban planning and environmental policy.

Cabinet	Minister			Term of office		Title	Ministry
Cabinet	Image	Name	Party	Start	End	Title	Ministry
Biesheuvel I		Werner Buck	KVP	17 August 1971	11 May 1973	State Secretary for Housing and Spatial Planning	Housing and Spatial Planning
Biesheuvel II		Werner Buck	KVP	17 August 1971	11 May 1973	State Secretary for Housing and Spatial Planning	Housing and Spatial Planning
Den Uyl	Jan Schaefer	Jan Schaefer	PvdA	11 May 1973	8 September 1977	State Secretary for Housing and Spatial Planning	Housing and Spatial Planning
Den Uyl	Marcel van Dam	Marcel van Dam	PvdA	11 May 1973	8 September 1977	State Secretary for Housing and Spatial Planning	Housing and Spatial Planning
Van Agt I	Gerrit Brokx	Gerrit Brokx	KVP	28 December 1977	11 September 1981	State Secretary for Housing and Spatial Planning	Housing and Spatial Planning
Van Agt I	Gerrit Brokx	Gerrit Brokx	CDA	28 December 1977	11 September 1981	State Secretary for Housing and Spatial Planning	Housing and Spatial Planning
Van Agt II	Siepie de Jong	Siepie de Jong	PvdA	11 September 1981	29 May 1982	State Secretary for Housing and Spatial Planning	Housing and Spatial Planning
Lubbers I	Gerrit Brokx	Gerrit Brokx	CDA	5 November 1982	23 October 1986	State Secretary for Housing, Spatial Planning and the Environment	Housing, Spatial Planning and the Environment
Lubbers II	Gerrit Brokx	Gerrit Brokx	CDA	5 November 1982	23 October 1986	State Secretary for Housing, Spatial Planning and the Environment	Housing, Spatial Planning and the Environment
Lubbers II	Enneüs Heerma	Enneüs Heerma	CDA	27 October 1986	22 August 1994	State Secretary for Housing, Spatial Planning and the Environment	Housing, Spatial Planning and the Environment
Lubbers III	Enneüs Heerma	Enneüs Heerma	CDA	27 October 1986	22 August 1994	State Secretary for Housing, Spatial Planning and the Environment	Housing, Spatial Planning and the Environment
Kok I	Dick Tommel	Dick Tommel	D66	22 August 1994	3 August 1998	State Secretary for Housing, Spatial Planning and the Environment	Housing, Spatial Planning and the Environment
Kok II	Johan Remkes	Johan Remkes	VVD	3 August 1998	22 July 2002	State Secretary for Housing, Spatial Planning and the Environment	Housing, Spatial Planning and the Environment
Balkenende I	Pieter van Geel	Pieter van Geel	CDA	22 July 2002	22 February 2007	State Secretary for Housing, Spatial Planning and the Environment	Housing, Spatial Planning and the Environment
Balkenende II	Pieter van Geel	Pieter van Geel	CDA	22 July 2002	22 February 2007	State Secretary for Housing, Spatial Planning and the Environment	Housing, Spatial Planning and the Environment
Balkenende III	Pieter van Geel	Pieter van Geel	CDA	22 July 2002	22 February 2007	State Secretary for Housing, Spatial Planning and the Environment	Housing, Spatial Planning and the Environment

== See also ==
- List of ministers of infrastructure of the Netherlands
- Ministry of Housing and Spatial Planning
