= Jaap de Hoop Scheffer =

11th Secretary General of NATO

His Excellency Jaap de Hoop Scheffer
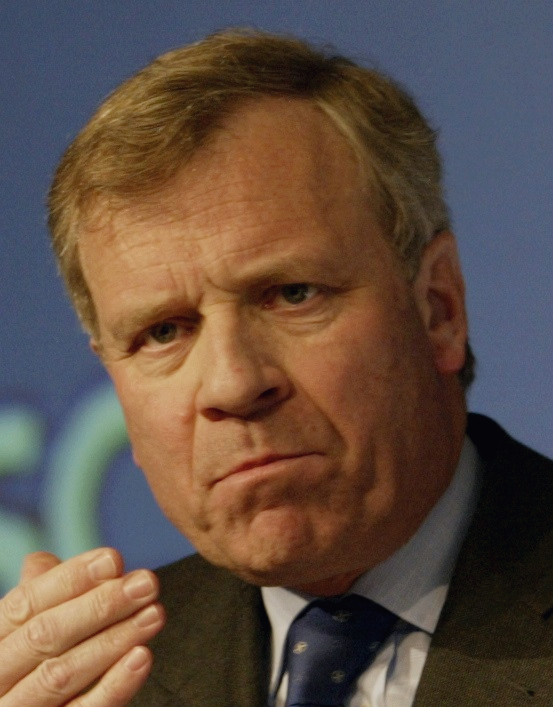
- De Hoop Scheffer in 2005

11th Secretary General of NATO
- In office 1 January 2004 – 1 August 2009
- Preceded by: Alessandro Minuto-Rizzo (acting)
- Succeeded by: Anders Fogh Rasmussen

Minister of Foreign Affairs
- In office 22 July 2002 – 3 December 2003
- Prime Minister: Jan Peter Balkenende
- Preceded by: Jozias van Aartsen
- Succeeded by: Ben Bot

Leader of the Christian Democratic Appeal
- In office 27 March 1997 – 1 October 2001
- Preceded by: Enneüs Heerma
- Succeeded by: Jan Peter Balkenende

Leader of the Christian Democratic Appeal in the House of Representatives
- In office 27 March 1997 – 1 October 2001
- Preceded by: Enneüs Heerma
- Succeeded by: Jan Peter Balkenende

Member of the House of Representatives
- In office 3 June 1986 – 23 May 2002

Personal details
- Born: Jakob Gijsbert de Hoop Scheffer; 3 April 1948 (age 78) Amsterdam, Netherlands
- Party: Christian Democratic Appeal (since 1982)
- Other political affiliations: Democrats 66 (1979–1982)
- Spouse: Jeannine van Oorschot (m. 1979)
- Children: 2 daughters
- Education: Leiden University (LL.B., LL.M.)
- Occupation: Politician; diplomat; civil servant; jurist; corporate director; nonprofit director; lobbyist; professor

Military service
- Allegiance: Netherlands
- Branch/service: Royal Netherlands Air and Space Force
- Years of service: 1974–1976 (Conscription); 1976–1978 (Reserve)
- Rank: Second lieutenant
- Battles/wars: Cold War

Jakob Gijsbert "Jaap" de Hoop Scheffer (Dutch: [ˈjaːb də ɦoːp ˈsxɛfər]; (Note: Jaap word in isolation: [ˈjaːp].) born 3 April 1948) is a Dutch retired politician, jurist and diplomat who served as the eleventh secretary general of NATO from January 2004 to August 2009. A member of the Christian Democratic Appeal (CDA), which he led from March 1997 to October 2001, he served as Minister of Foreign Affairs from July 2002 until December 2003 under Prime Minister Jan Peter Balkenende.

De Hoop Scheffer studied law at Leiden University obtaining a Master of Laws degree before he worked as a civil servant and diplomat for the Ministry of Foreign Affairs and the diplomatic service from October 1976 until June 1986. In the 1986 general election he was elected as a member of the House of Representatives, where he served a frontbencher and spokesperson for foreign and European affairs. After party leader and parliamentary leader Enneüs Heerma stepped down De Hoop Scheffer was selected as his successor on 27 March 1997; he was the party's lead candidate for the 1998 general election. Following an internal power struggle with party chairman Marnix van Rij before an upcoming general election De Hoop Scheffer announced that he was stepping down as leader and would not stand at the election.

De Hoop Scheffer continued to be active in politics and was appointed as Minister of Foreign Affairs in the Balkenende I cabinet taking office on 22 July 2002. The cabinet fell just 87 days into its term. After the 2003 general election De Hoop Scheffer continued his office in the Balkenende II cabinet. In September 2003 De Hoop Scheffer was nominated as the next Secretary General of NATO serving from 1 January 2004 until 1 August 2009.

De Hoop Scheffer retired from active politics at 61 and became active in the private and public sectors as a corporate and non-profit director served on several state commissions and councils and as a occasional diplomat and lobbyist for several economic delegations on behalf of the government, he also worked as a distinguished professor of International relations, Diplomatic Practice and Governmental Studies at his alma mater Leiden University from September 2009 until September 2014. He is still involved with his alma mater as a Distinguished Fellow at Leiden University College The Hague.

Following his retirement, De Hoop Scheffer continues to be active as an advocate and lobbyist for more European integration and improved Transatlantic relations. De Hoop Scheffer is known for his abilities as an effective negotiator and skilful manager. De Hoop Scheffer was granted the honorary title of Minister of State on 22 June 2018 and as of 2026 continues to comment on political affairs as a statesman.

== Early life ==
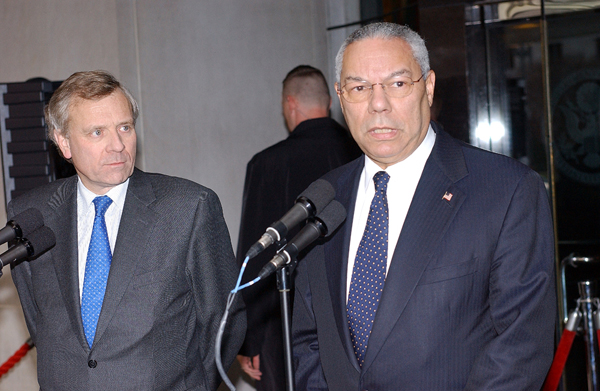
Secretary General of NATO Jaap de Hoop Scheffer and United States Secretary of State Colin Powell during a press conference at the Harry S Truman Building on 10 November 2004

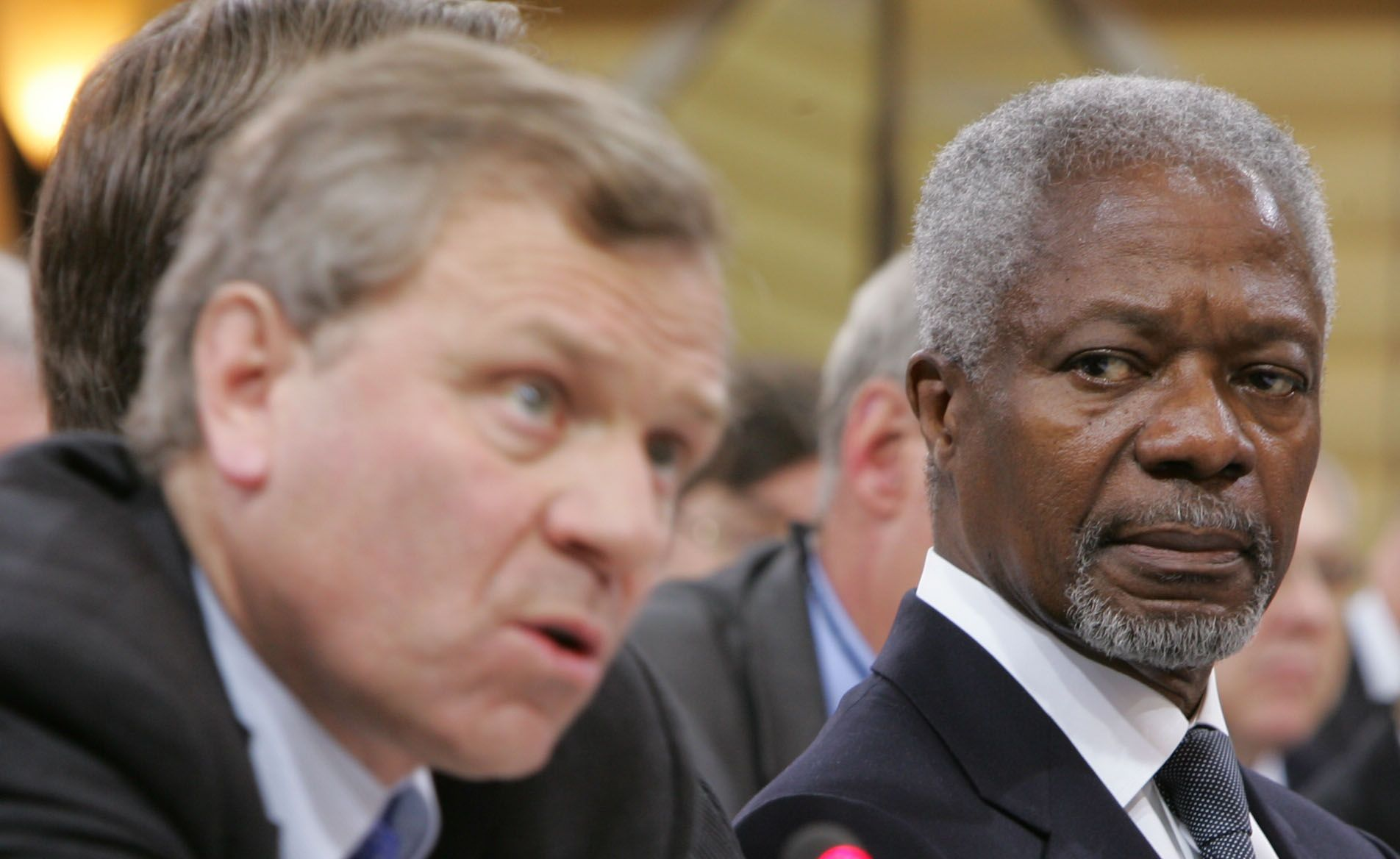
Secretary General of NATO Jaap de Hoop Scheffer and Secretary-General of the United Nations Kofi Annan during the Munich Security Conference of 2005 on 12 February 2005

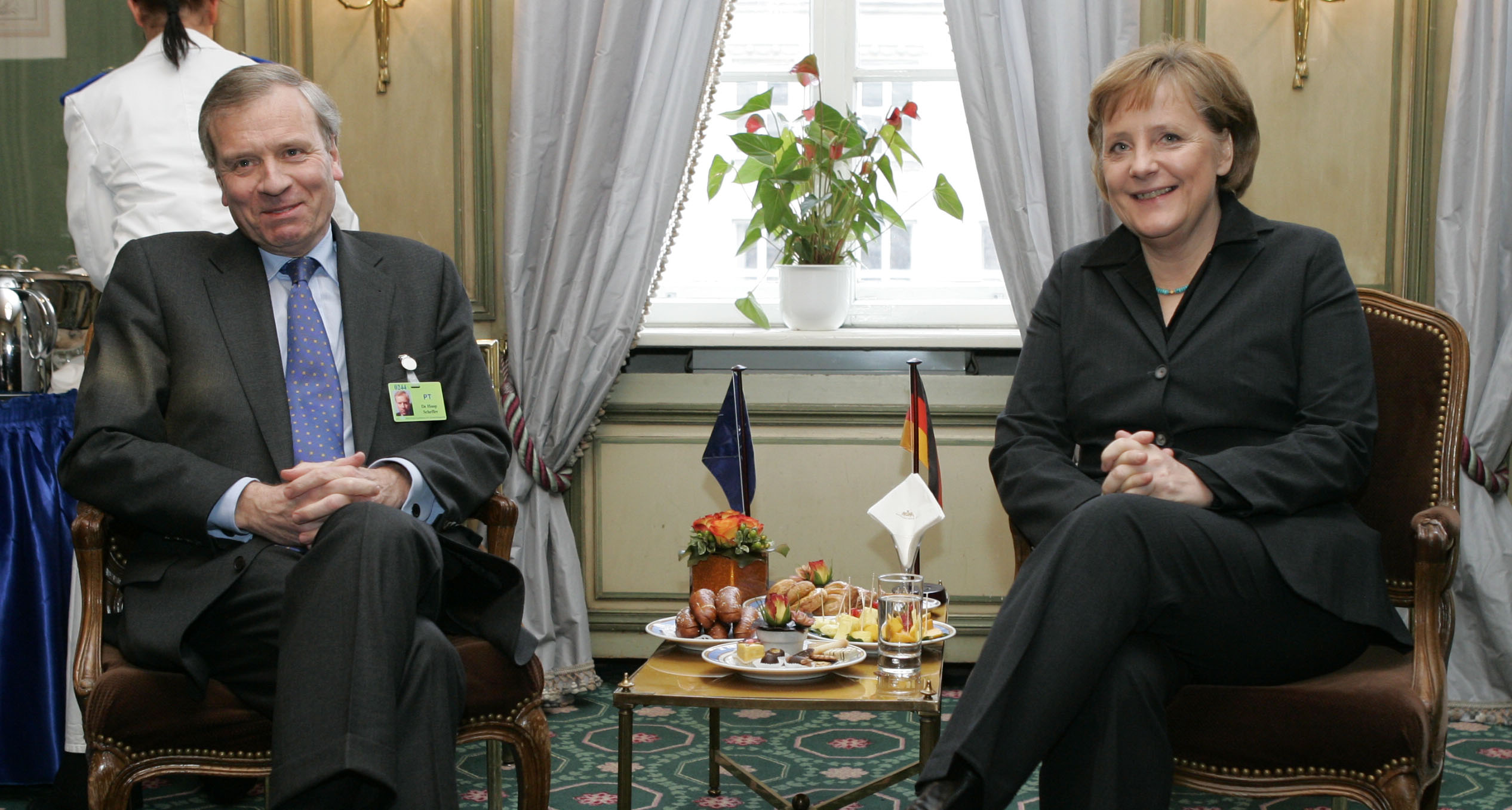
Secretary General of NATO Jaap de Hoop Scheffer and Chancellor of Germany Angela Merkel during a meeting at the Munich Security Conference of 2006 on 4 February 2006

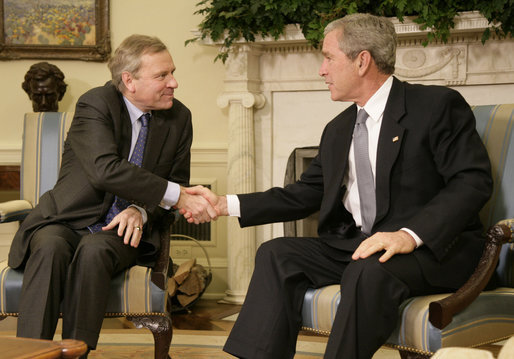
Secretary General of NATO Jaap de Hoop Scheffer and President of the United States George W. Bush during a meeting in the Oval Office in the White House on 27 October 2006

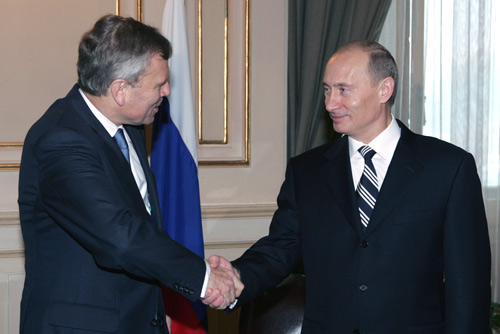
Secretary General of NATO Jaap de Hoop Scheffer and President of Russia Vladimir Putin during a meeting at the 2008 Bucharest summit in Bucharest on 4 April 2008

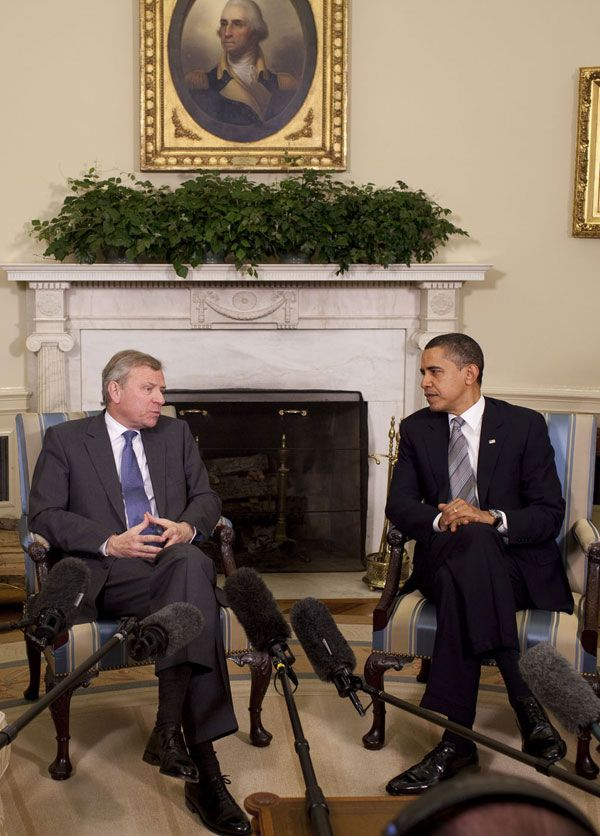
Secretary General of NATO Jaap de Hoop Scheffer and President of the United States Barack Obama during a meeting in the Oval Office in the White House on 25 March 2009

De Hoop Scheffer attended the Ignatius Gymnasium in Amsterdam from March 1961 until April 1966 and applied at the Leiden University in June 1968 majoring in Law and obtaining a Bachelor of Laws degree in June 1970 before graduating with a Master of Laws degree in July 1974. De Hoop Scheffer was conscripted in the Royal Netherlands Air Force serving as a Second lieutenant from August 1974 until September 1976. De Hoop Scheffer worked as a civil servant for the Diplomatic service of the Ministry of Foreign Affairs from October 1976 until June 1986 as an Attaché in Accra, Ghana from October 1976 until April 1978 and in Brussels, Belgium for the NATO delegation from April 1978 until December 1980 and as secretary to the Minister of Foreign Affairs from December 1980 until June 1986.

== Political career ==
=== Member of the House of Representatives ===
De Hoop Scheffer was a member of the social liberal Democrats 66 (D66) party from 1979 until 1982 until he became a member of the Christian Democratic Appeal (CDA). In the 1986 general election De Hoop Scheffer was elected to the House of Representatives on 3 June 1986 and served as a frontbencher chairing the parliamentary committees for Development Cooperation and for Foreign Affairs and was spokesperson for foreign affairs, European affairs, NATO, development cooperation and development aid.

=== Leader of Christian Democratic Appeal (1997–2001) ===
After the Leader of the Christian Democratic Appeal and Parliamentary leader of the CDA in the House of Representatives Enneüs Heerma announced that he was stepping down as leader and parliamentary leader following increasing criticism on his leadership, the CDA leadership approached De Hoop Scheffer as a candidate to succeed him. De Hoop Scheffer accepted and became leader and parliamentary leader on 27 March 1997.

For the 1998 general election De Hoop Scheffer served as lead candidate and the CDA suffered a loss, losing 5 seats and now had 29 seats in the House of Representatives. On 1 October 2001 De Hoop Scheffer announced that he was stepping down as leader and parliamentary leader following an internal power struggle with the party chairman Marnix van Rij and that he would not stand for the election of 2002.

=== Dutch Foreign Minister ===
The CDA won in the 2002 general elections and played the leading role in the formation of a new coalition government. The new Prime Minister Jan Peter Balkenende appointed De Hoop Scheffer as foreign minister in his short-lived first cabinet, a position he retained in the second Balkenende cabinet after the elections of 22 January 2003.

In 2003, the foreign policy of the Netherlands was largely determined by De Hoop Scheffer and Balkenende. Its main foreign policy decision was to contribute to Operation Iraqi Freedom, although its formulation ("political" but not "military" support) gave it an ambivalent character. However, 1,100 Dutch servicemen were deployed as part of the Stabilisation Force Iraq in the southern province of Al Muthanna from 2003 till 2005, and two of them were killed in action.

In 2003 Jaap de Hoop Scheffer was also the Chairman-in-Office of the Organization for Security and Co-operation in Europe.

=== NATO Secretary General (2004–2009) ===
He became the 11th Secretary General of NATO on 5 January 2004, succeeding Lord Robertson, who held the post from 1999 until 2003. The announcement was made on 22 September 2003. As Secretary General, De Hoop Scheffer urged NATO members to contribute more to NATO operations such as the International Security Assistance Force in Afghanistan. He "informed a NATO conference that 'NATO troops have to guard pipelines that transport oil and gas that is directed for the West,' and more generally to protect sea routes used by tankers and other 'crucial infrastructure' of the energy system".

On 21 June 2007, De Hoop Scheffer attended an economic conference in Montreal where he encouraged Canada to continue its military mission in Afghanistan past its 2009 withdrawal date. He said, "I think more time is necessary to create those conditions for reconstruction and development to go on." His visit coincided with the death of three more Canadian soldiers in Afghanistan. "I know how dramatic it is if Canadian soldiers pay the highest price, but I still say, you are there for a good cause." De Hoop Scheffer's comments were made as the Harper government was under pressure by opposition politicians to define the length of Canada's commitment to the mission in Afghanistan.

It has been alleged by Iran that Jaap de Hoop Scheffer met Jundallah leader Abdolmalek Rigi while he was visiting Afghanistan in 2008 amid Iranian accusations that the CIA was backing the terrorist group. This accusation was later denied by NATO.

On 21 July 2009 De Hoop Scheffer suffered a heart attack. He underwent angioplasty after which he was reported to be in stable condition.

His successor, Anders Fogh Rasmussen, took office on 1 August 2009.

== Post-political career ==
On 1 September 2009 De Hoop Scheffer was appointed to the Pieter Kooijmans Chair for Peace, Law and Security at Leiden University. The appointment is part-time, and the holder of this chair is appointed for a maximum of three years.

In addition, De Hoop Scheffer has held a variety of paid and unpaid positions, including:

- Air France–KLM, Independent Member of the Board of Directors
- Bahrain Center for Strategic, International and Energy Studies (DERASAT), Member of the International Advisory Board
- Friends of Europe, Member of the Board of Trustees
- Trilateral Commission, Member of the European Group
- Ethics counselor to the cabinet of the Netherlands (starting March 2024)

== Honours and awards ==
- Knight of the Order of Orange-Nassau (Netherlands, 22 May 2002)
- Officer of the Order of Orange-Nassau (Netherlands, 12 December 2003)
- Knight Grand Cross of the Order of Orange-Nassau (Netherlands, 6 July 2009, for his services as Secretary General of NATO)
- Member 1st Class of the Order of the Balkan Mountains (Bulgaria, 2009)
- Grand Cross of the Grand Order of King Petar Krešimir IV (Croatia, 5 February 2009)
- Member 1st Class of the Order of the Cross of Terra Mariana (Estonia, 6 July 2009)
- Knight Grand Cross of the Order of Merit of the Italian Republic (Italy, 16 February 2009)
- Grand Officer of the Order of the Three Stars (Latvia, November 2004, for his commitment to a United Europe)
- Grand Cross of the Order of Vytautas the Great (Lithuania, 26 June 2009)
- Grand Cross of the Order of Merit of the Republic of Poland (Poland, 12 March 2009)
- Grand Cross of the Order of the Star of Romania (Romania, 10 May 2004)
- Member 1st Class of the Order of the White Double Cross (Slovakia, 2009)
- Recipient of the Order for Exceptional Merits (Slovenia, 2009)
- Honorary Knight Commander of the Order of St Michael and St George (United Kingdom, 10 February 2010, for his services to NATO)

== Notes ==
Party political offices
Preceded by Enneüs Heerma	Leader of the Christian Democratic Appeal; 1997–2002	Succeeded by Jan Peter Balkenende
Preceded by Enneüs Heerma	Leader of the Christian Democratic Appeal in the House of Representatives; 1997–2002	Succeeded by Jan Peter Balkenende
Political offices
Preceded by Jozias van Aartsen	Minister of Foreign Affairs; 2002–2003	Succeeded by Ben Bot
Diplomatic posts
Preceded by Alessandro Minuto-Rizzo; Acting	Secretary General of NATO; 2004–2009	Succeeded by Anders Fogh Rasmussen
