= Ruud Lubbers =

Prime Minister of the Netherlands from 1982 to 1994

His Excellency Ruud Lubbers
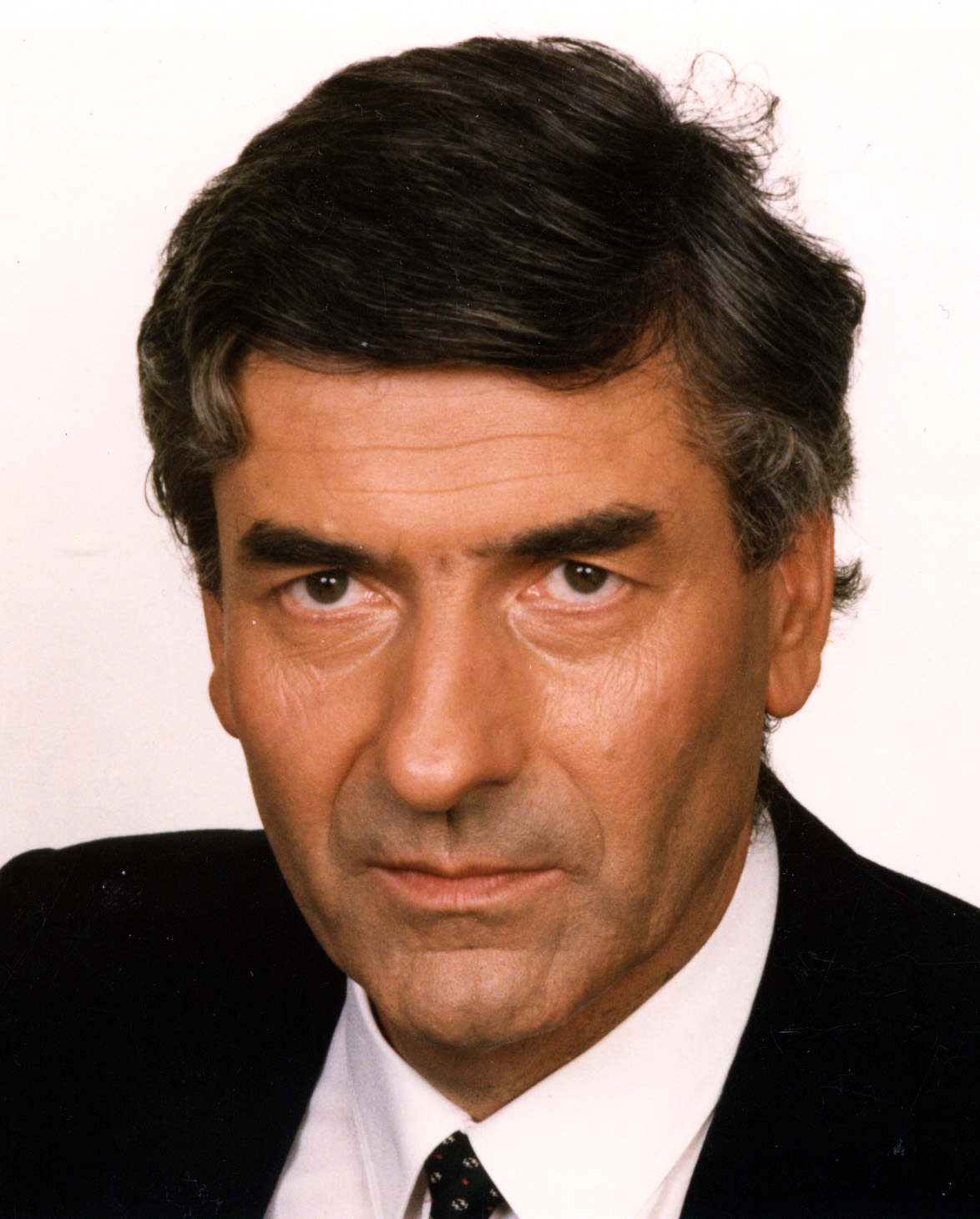
- Official portrait, 1985

Prime Minister of the Netherlands
- In office 4 November 1982 – 22 August 1994
- Monarch: Beatrix
- Deputy: Gijs van Aardenne (1982–1986); Rudolf de Korte (1986–1989); Wim Kok (1989–1994)
- Preceded by: Dries van Agt
- Succeeded by: Wim Kok

United Nations High Commissioner for Refugees
- In office 1 January 2001 – 20 February 2005
- Secretary-General: Kofi Annan
- Preceded by: Sadako Ogata
- Succeeded by: António Guterres

Leader of the Christian Democratic Appeal
- In office 25 October 1982 – 29 January 1994
- Preceded by: Dries van Agt
- Succeeded by: Elco Brinkman

Parliamentary leader in the House of Representatives
- In office 14 September 1989 – 7 November 1989
- Preceded by: Bert de Vries
- Succeeded by: Elco Brinkman
- In office 3 June 1986 – 14 July 1986
- Preceded by: Bert de Vries
- Succeeded by: Bert de Vries
- In office 24 August 1981 – 4 November 1982
- Preceded by: Dries van Agt
- Succeeded by: Bert de Vries
- In office 7 November 1978 – 10 June 1981
- Preceded by: Willem Aantjes
- Succeeded by: Dries van Agt

Member of the House of Representatives
- In office 14 September 1989 – 7 November 1989
- In office 3 June 1986 – 14 July 1986
- In office 22 December 1977 – 4 November 1982
- In office 8 June 1977 – 8 September 1977

Minister of Economic Affairs
- In office 11 May 1973 – 19 December 1977
- Prime Minister: Joop den Uyl
- Preceded by: Harrie Langman
- Succeeded by: Gijs van Aardenne

Personal details
- Born: Rudolphus Franciscus Marie Lubbers; 7 May 1939 Rotterdam, Netherlands
- Died: 14 February 2018 (aged 78) Rotterdam, Netherlands
- Party: Christian Democratic Appeal (from 1980)
- Other political affiliations: Catholic People's Party (1964–1980)
- Spouse: Ria Hoogeweegen (m. 1962)
- Children: 3
- Education: Rotterdam School of Economics (BEc, M.Econ)
- Occupation: Activist; businessperson; conservationist; corporate executive; diplomat; economist; nonprofit executive; lobbyist; politician; professor
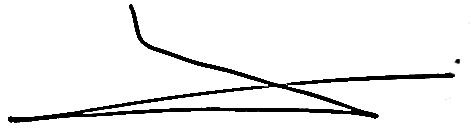
- Signature

Military service
- Allegiance: Netherlands
- Branch/service: Royal Netherlands Air and Space Force
- Years of service: 1962–1963 (Conscription); 1963–1969 (Reserve)
- Rank: Second lieutenant
- Battles/wars: Cold War

Rudolphus Franciscus Marie "Ruud" Lubbers (Dutch pronunciation: [ryt ˈlʏbərs]; 7 May 1939 – 14 February 2018) was a Dutch politician, diplomat and businessman who served as prime minister of the Netherlands from 1982 to 1994, and as United Nations High Commissioner for Refugees from 2001 to 2005. He was a member of the Catholic People's Party (KVP), which later merged to become the Christian Democratic Appeal (CDA) party.

Lubbers studied Economics at the Erasmus School of Economics obtaining a Master of Science degree and worked as a corporate director for the manufacturing company Hollandia in Rotterdam from April 1963 until May 1973 and as trade association executive for the Christian Employers' Association (NCW) from January 1965 until May 1973. After the election of 1972 Lubbers was appointed as Minister of Economic Affairs in the Den Uyl cabinet taking office on 11 May 1973. Lubbers was elected as a Member of the House of Representatives after the election of 1977 serving from 8 June 1977 until 8 September 1977. Following the cabinet formation of 1977 Lubbers was asked to become Minister of Housing and Spatial Planning in the new cabinet but declined and returned as a Member of the House of Representatives on 22 December 1977, serving as a frontbencher and spokesperson for Economic Affairs. Following the resignation of parliamentary leader Willem Aantjes Lubbers was selected as his successor taking office on 7 November 1978.

Shortly after the election of 1982 incumbent prime minister and CDA leader Dries van Agt unexpectedly announced he was stepping down and Lubbers was unanimously selected as his successor as Leader and the de facto next prime minister. Following cabinet formation of 1982 Lubbers formed the first Lubbers cabinet and became prime minister taking office on 4 November 1982. For the election of 1986 Lubbers served as lead candidate and after a cabinet formation formed the second Lubbers cabinet and continued as prime minister for a second term. For the election of 1989 Lubbers again served as lead candidate and following another successful cabinet formation formed the third Lubbers cabinet and continued as prime minister for a third term. In October 1993 Lubbers announced he was stepping down as Leader, and that he would not stand at the election of 1994 or serve another term as prime minister. He left office at the installation of the first Kok cabinet on 22 August 1994.

Lubbers semi-retired from active politics and became active in the public sector as a non-profit director and served on several state commissions and councils on behalf of the government, he also served as a distinguished visiting professor of international relations and globalization at the Tilburg University and the John F. Kennedy School of Government of the Harvard University in Cambridge, Massachusetts from February 1995 until December 2000. In November 2000 Lubbers was nominated as the next United Nations High Commissioner for Refugees serving from 1 January 2001 until 20 February 2005. Following his retirement Lubbers continued to be active in the public sector and worked as an advocate, lobbyist and activist for humanitarian, conservation, environmentalism, sustainable development and climate change issues. He was subject to some scrutiny, such as a sexual harassment scandal in 2004 which led to his resignation from the United Nations.

Lubbers was known for his abilities as a team leader and consensus builder. During his premiership, his cabinets were responsible for major reforms to social security, stimulating privatization and sustainable development, revitalizing the economy following the recession in the 1980s and reducing the deficit. Lubbers was granted the honorary title of Minister of State on 31 January 1995 and continued to comment on political affairs as a statesman until his death at the age of 78. At 43 years, he was the youngest prime minister of the Netherlands until Rob Jetten in 2026. He was the longest-serving prime minister with 11 years, 291 days until Mark Rutte overtook this record on 2 August 2022. He is consistently ranked both by scholars and the public as one of the best prime ministers after World War II.

== Biography ==
=== Early life ===
Rudolphus Franciscus Marie Lubbers was born on 7 May 1939 in Rotterdam in the Province of South Holland. He studied economics at the Erasmus University Rotterdam and was a student of the first Nobel Prize in Economics laureate Jan Tinbergen. As suggested by the title of his 1962 thesis – "The influence of differing productivity trends in various countries on the current account of the balance of payments" – his main interest was in monetary affairs. He originally planned an academic career but was compelled by family circumstances to join the management of Lubbers' Construction Workshops and Machinery Fabricators Hollandia B.V.

=== Politics ===
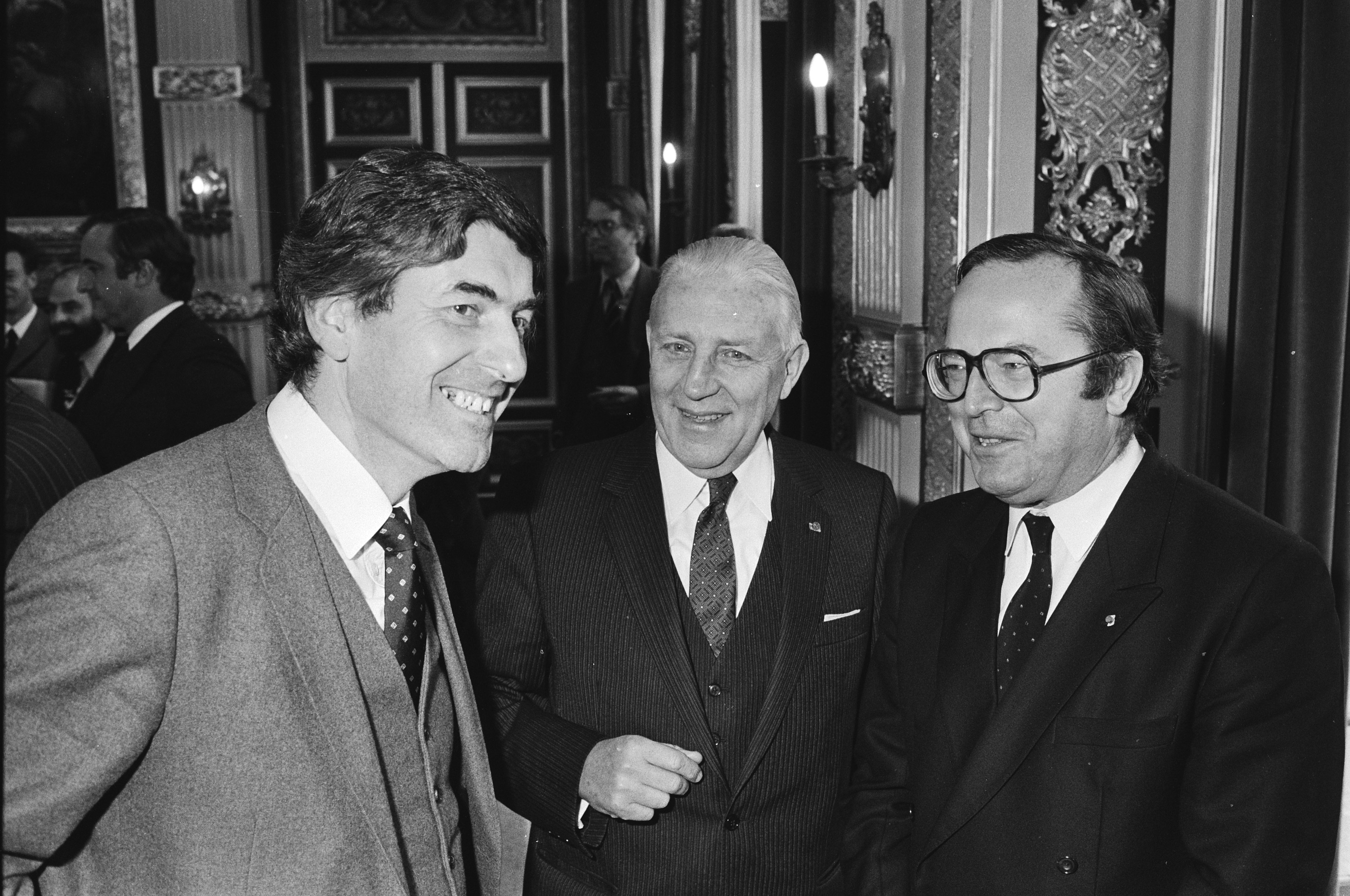
Prime Minister Ruud Lubbers, Prime Minister of Luxembourg Pierre Werner and Prime Minister of Belgium Wilfried Martens at the Binnenhof on 10 November 1982.

From 11 May 1973 to 19 December 1977, Ruud Lubbers was Minister of Economic Affairs in the Den Uyl cabinet and a member of the Catholic People's Party (KVP). He was an effective if sometimes somewhat bad-tempered minister. He chose to return to Parliament on the formation of the Van Agt government in 1977, becoming senior deputy parliamentary leader of the Christian Democratic Appeal (CDA), the alliance between the KVP and the other two main Christian parties. His career got an unexpected boost when the leader of the parliamentary faction of the CDA, Willem Aantjes, had to resign in 1978 because of accusations that he had served in the Germanic-SS during the Second World War. Lubbers succeeded him and suddenly found himself in a powerful political position.

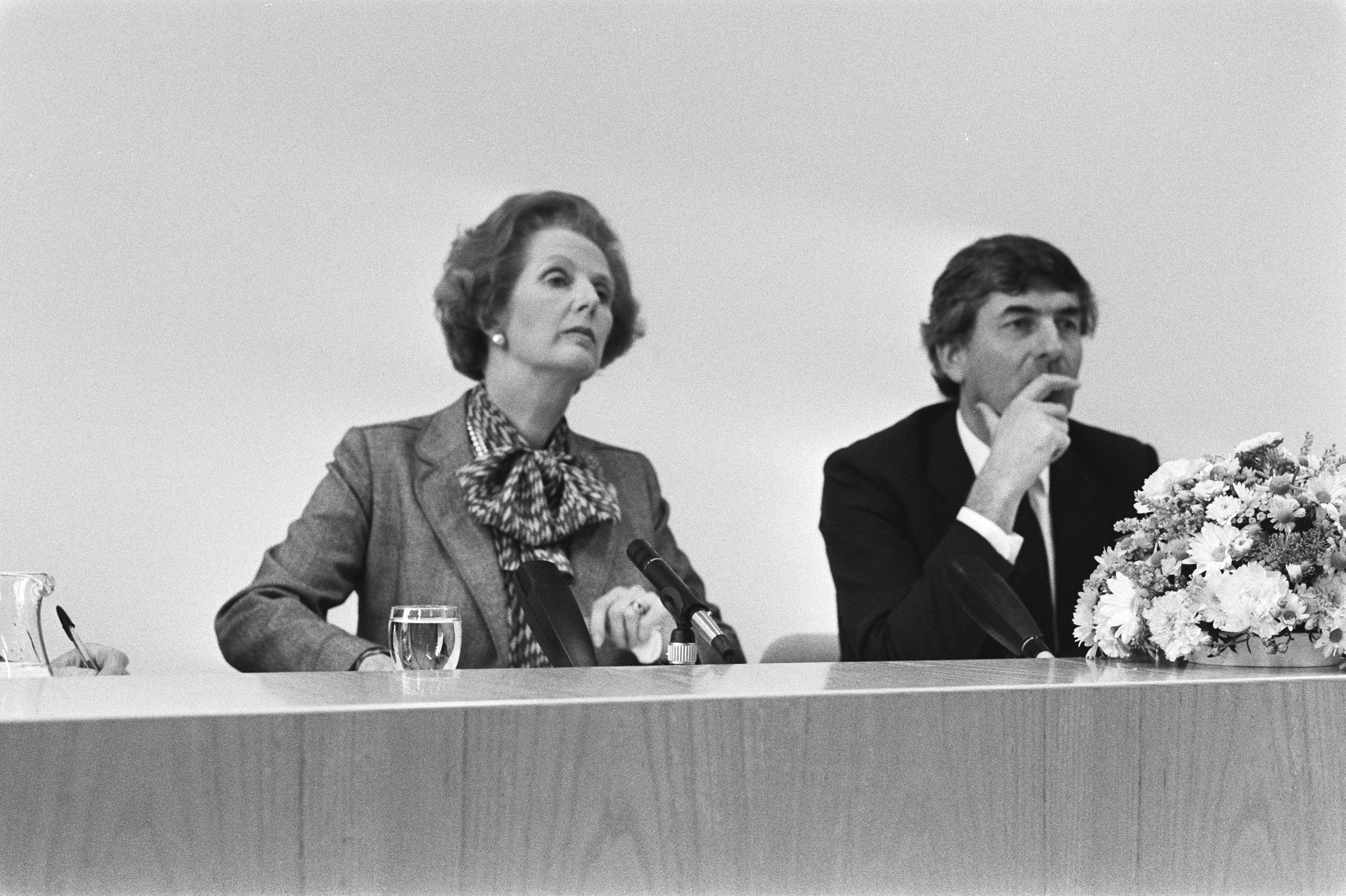
Prime Minister of the United Kingdom Margaret Thatcher and Prime Minister Ruud Lubbers at a press conference in The Hague on 19 September 1983.

In 1982, after the general election won by Prime Minister Dries van Agt, a similar thing happened when Van Agt suddenly announced he would not serve for a third term. Lubbers took over the post. He was the youngest prime minister in Dutch history; he had turned 43 only six months earlier. Major aspects of his time in office included extensive cutbacks in public spending, the launch of far-reaching deregulation and privatisation programs, and a massive demonstration in The Hague (1983) against the planned installation in the Netherlands of nuclear-armed U.S. cruise missiles (which was cancelled after all due to arms reduction talks between the US and the Soviet Union).

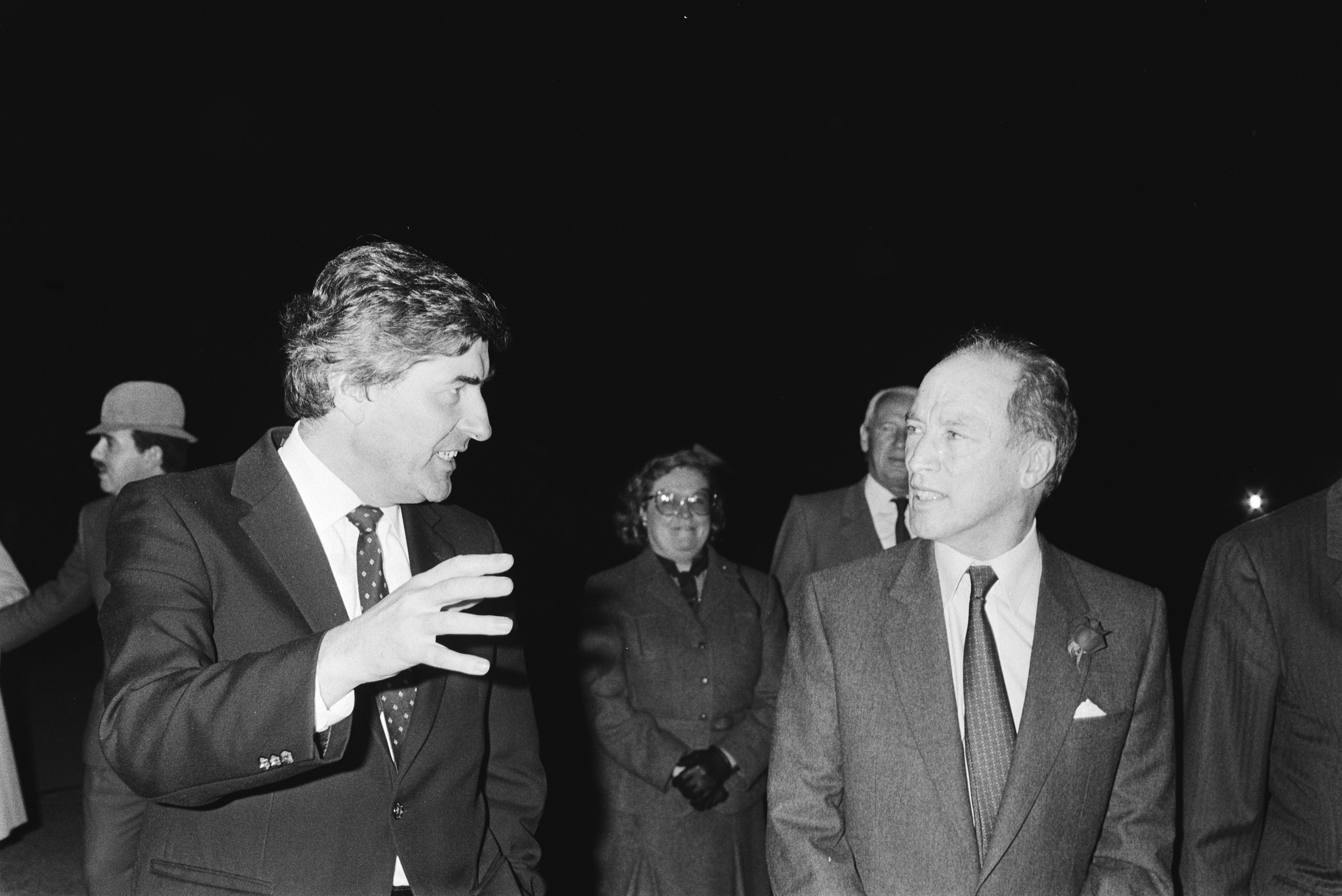
Prime Minister Ruud Lubbers and Prime Minister of Canada Pierre Trudeau at Valkenburg Naval Air Base on 8 November 1983.

After leaving office in 1994, Lubbers was put forward as a candidate for the head of NATO, but the U.S. vetoed his appointment owing to concerns over his leadership abilities and lack of military experience (particularly in light of the ongoing conflicts in the Balkans). He was on the advisory board of the Official Monetary and Financial Institutions Forum (OMFIF), where he was regularly involved in meetings regarding the financial and monetary system.

Lubbers was regarded by many during his time in office as an ideological heir to Margaret Thatcher. One of his campaign slogans was: "Meer markt, minder overheid" (more market, less government).

=== Ecological activities ===
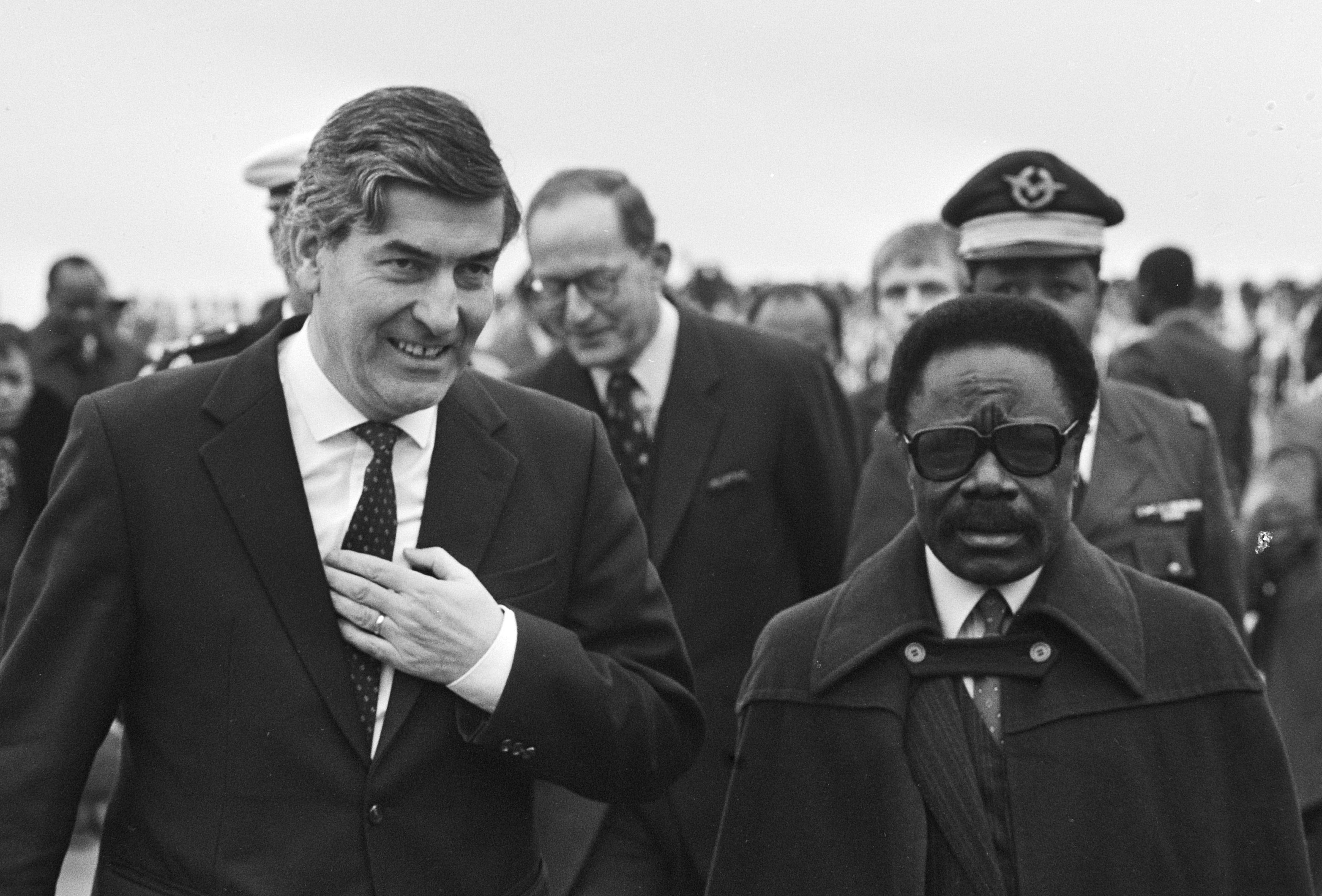
Prime Minister Ruud Lubbers and President of Gabon Omar Bongo at Zestienhoven Airport on 7 November 1984.

In the follow-up of the Earth Summit in 1992, Lubbers engaged with the Earth Charter Initiative in cooperation with Mikhail Gorbachev and Maurice Strong. The Earth Charter document was launched in the Peace Palace in The Hague in June 2000. Lubbers was an active member of the International Earth Charter Commission and reached out, especially to youth in the Netherlands, with the message of the Earth Charter for a sustainable and peaceful world.

=== Academic ===
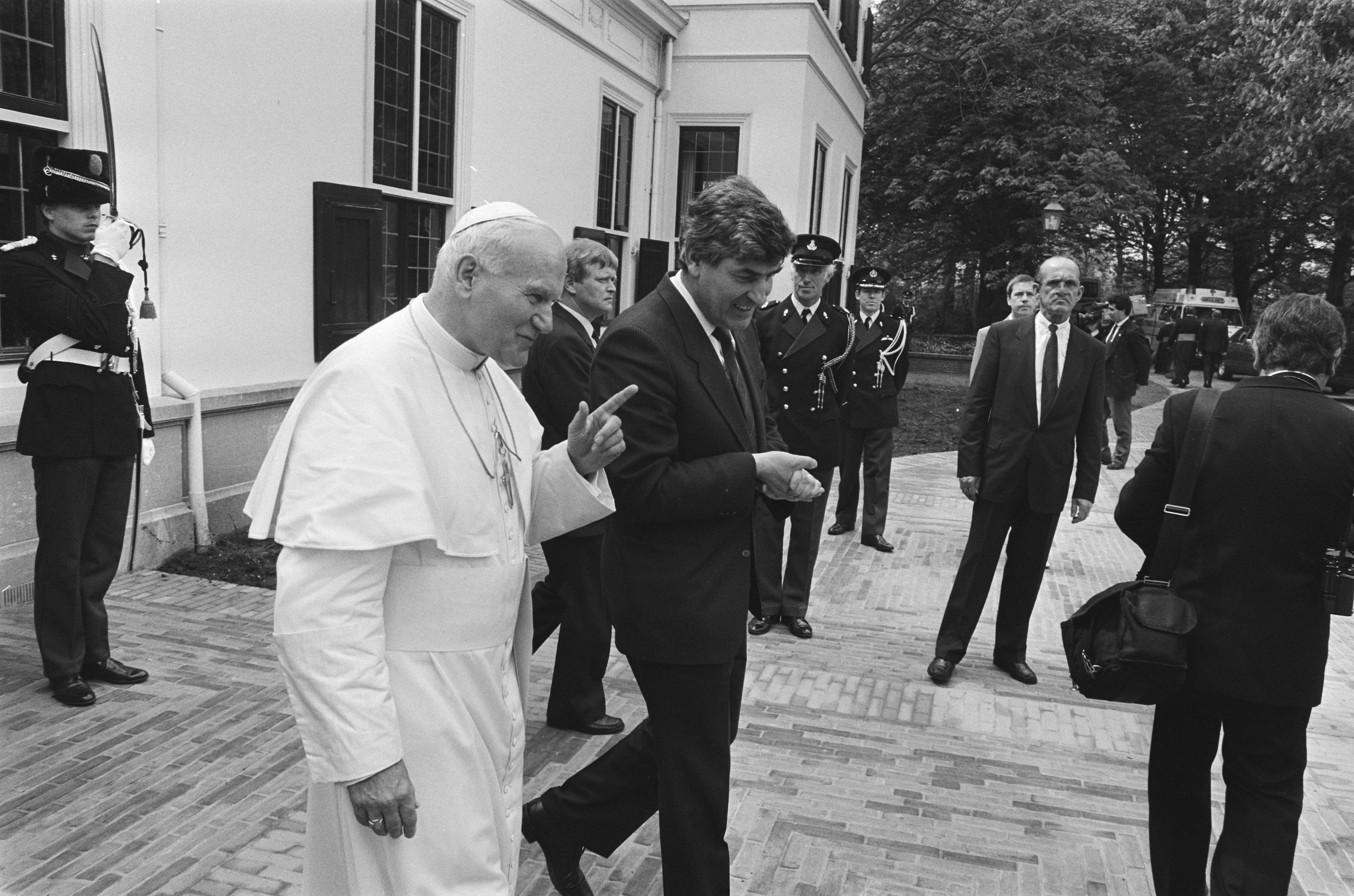
Pope John Paul II and Prime Minister Ruud Lubbers at the Catshuis on 13 May 1985.

From 1995 to 2000, he taught Globalization Studies at Tilburg University in the Netherlands and at the John F. Kennedy School of Government at Harvard University in the United States. He was also vice-chairman of the Independent World Commission on the Oceans and chair of Globus, the Institute for Globalization and Development based in Tilburg.

=== UN High Commissioner for Refugees ===
At the end of the year 2000, Lubbers was appointed by the Secretary-General of the United Nations Kofi Annan to succeed Sadako Ogata as UN High Commissioner for Refugees (UNHCR).

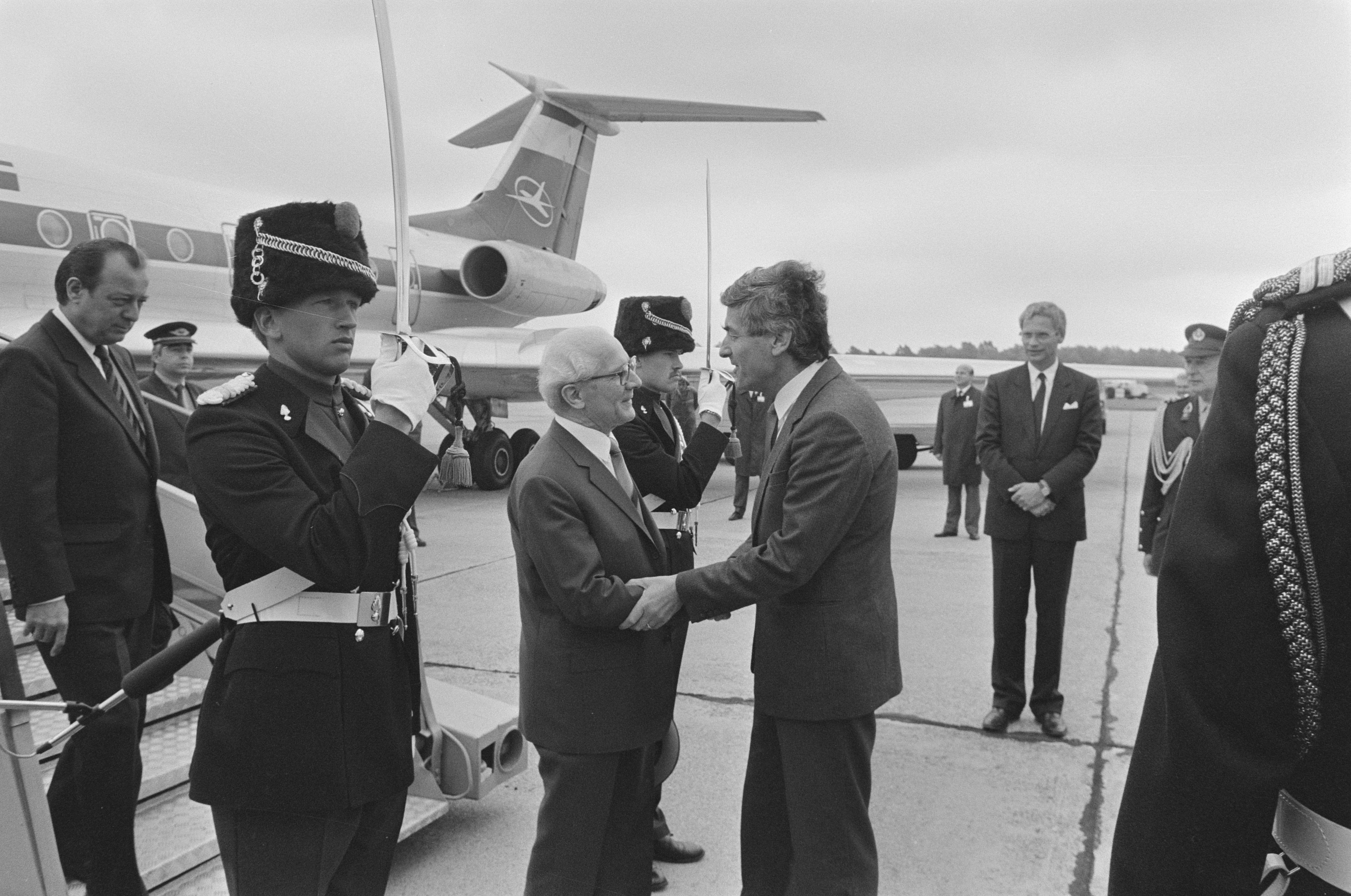
Leader of East-Germany Erich Honecker, Prime Minister Ruud Lubbers and Minister of Foreign Affairs Hans van den Broek at Zestienhoven Airport on 3 June 1987.

From 1 January 2001, Lubbers headed the UNHCR, which comprised over 5,000 employees who work across the globe, and which was concerned with an estimated 21 million refugees and internally displaced in over 120 countries worldwide. During his tenure, the number of refugees worldwide decreased by almost 22%, from 21.8 million in 2001 to close to 17.1 million at the beginning of 2004.

Lubbers also favoured a generous refugee policy for the Netherlands, and he was critical of the Foreign Citizens Law (Vreemdelingenwet). He also stabilised the UNHCR's financial situation and greatly increased the financial means for the sheltering of refugees.

He annually donated some $300,000 to the refugee agency since he assumed his post in 2001, thereby covering his own $167,000 annual salary and travel expenses.

==== Handling of the UNHCR/SC-UK 2002 report on sexual exploitation in the aid sector in West Africa ====
In 2002, Lubbers was criticised for his handling of a joint UNHCR/Save the Children UK report, which uncovered widespread sexual exploitation of refugee children by aid workers and peacekeepers in three West African countries (Liberia, Guinea and Sierra Leone). These findings, discovered unexpectedly during a broader assessment documented 67 allegations implicating 40 aid agencies and several peacekeeping battalions, often involving humanitarian workers and peacekeepers exchanging small quantities of aid for sex with children.

Lubbers publicly dismissed the findings, discredited the authors and downplayed the abuses. In an interview on 8 May 2002, he denied the problem even after the network's own research corroborated the allegations, describing some exploitative relationships as "romances". In response, the UN General Assembly adopted resolution 57/306, 'Investigation into sexual exploitation of refugees by aid workers in West Africa' in May 2003, requiring the UN to take action at the highest level to tackle such abuses. This was followed by the UN Secretary-General's Bulletin, 'Special measures for protection from sexual exploitation and sexual abuse' in October 2003, and the formal endorsement of the Inter-agency Standing Committee's working group on sexual abuse and exploitation, established in June 2002 in response to the report.

==== Sexual harassment complaint ====
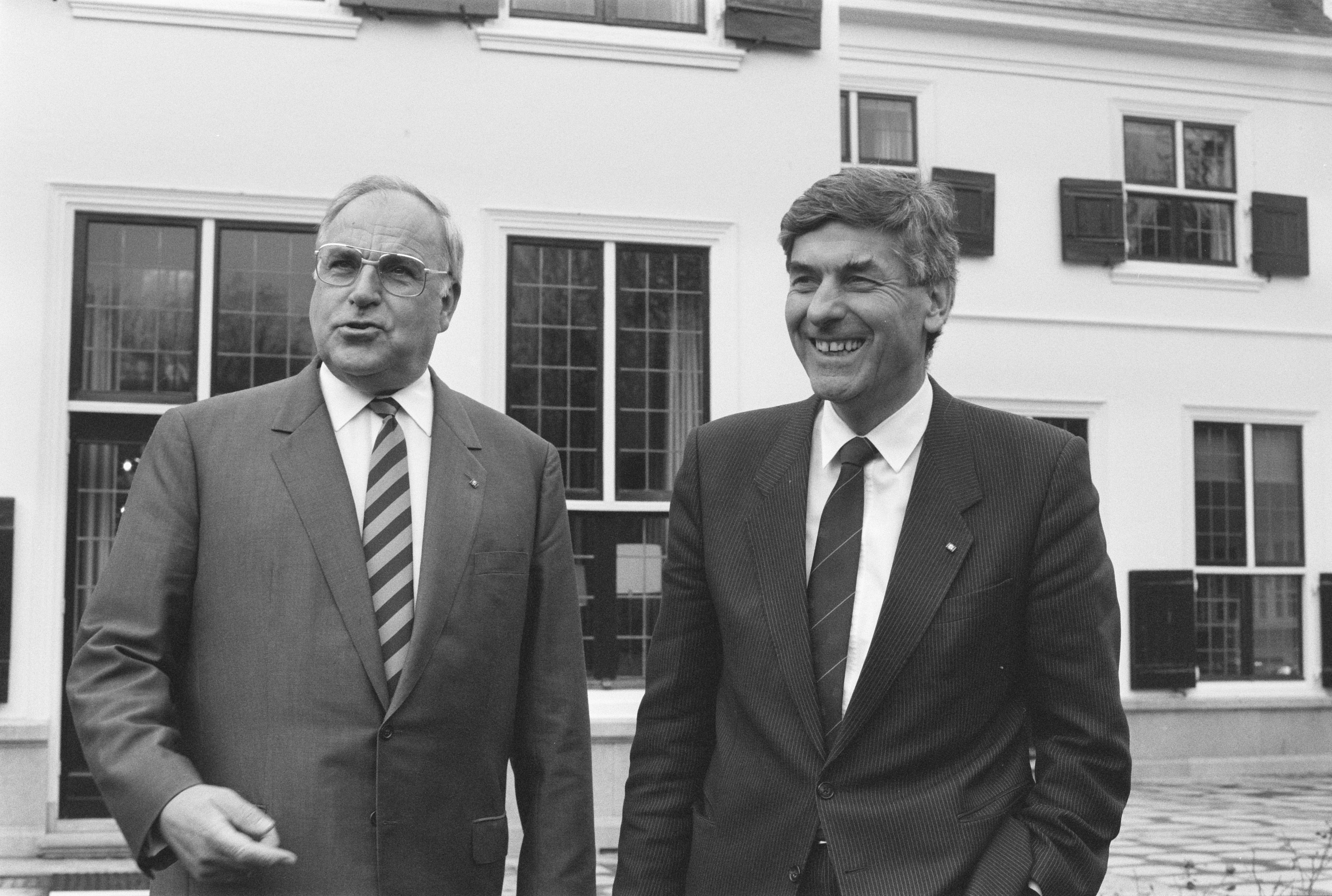
Chancellor of West Germany Helmut Kohl and Prime Minister Ruud Lubbers at the Catshuis on 30 November 1987.

In May 2004, Lubbers was accused by Cynthia Brzak, an American UNHCR employee, of sexual harassment following a meeting in his office that was attended by two other UNHCR staff members. The complaint was reported in the media, prompting Lubbers to inform UNHCR staff about the accusation. On this occasion, he denied any wrongdoing and rejected the allegation against him. On 2 June 2004, the United Nations Office of Internal Oversight Services (OIOS), which was tasked with investigating the accusation, sent its report to UN Secretary-General Kofi Annan. In its public annual report to the UN Secretary-General (presented to the UN General Assembly), the OIOS reported concerning the case that it had "submitted a report to the Secretary-General supporting the allegations and recommended that appropriate actions be taken accordingly."

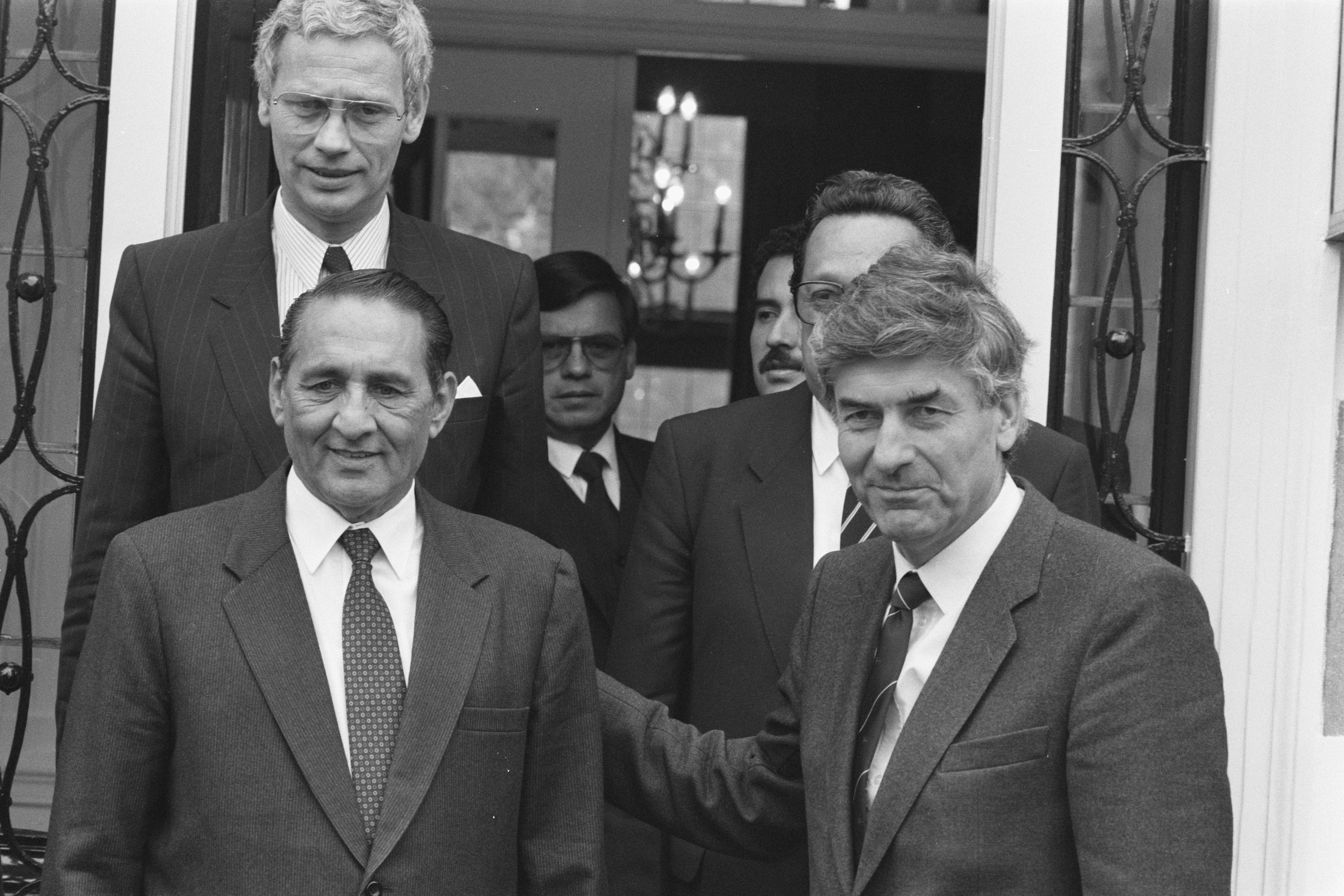
Prime Minister of the Netherlands Lubbers receives President Jose Napoleon Duarte of El Salvador.

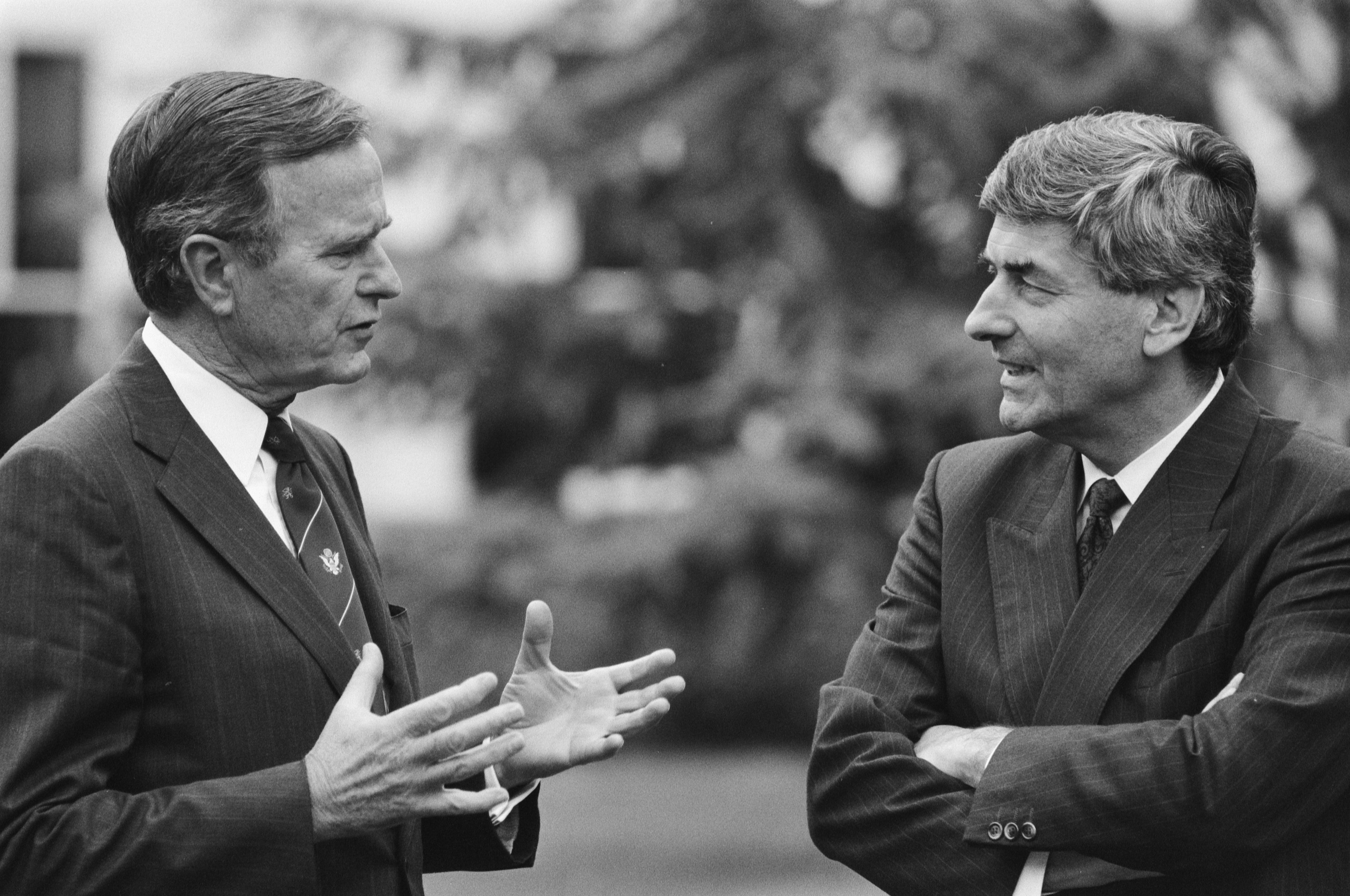
President of the United States George H. W. Bush and Prime Minister Ruud Lubbers at the Catshuis on 17 July 1989.

Lubbers responded to the OIOS report in a letter setting out to (a) deny acts of sexual harassment or abuse took place; (b) establish that such evidence of the alleged misconduct as is said to exist is insufficient and flawed; and (c) conclude that the report itself would appear to be based on an irregular statutory basis and also flawed by errors of law and reasoning."

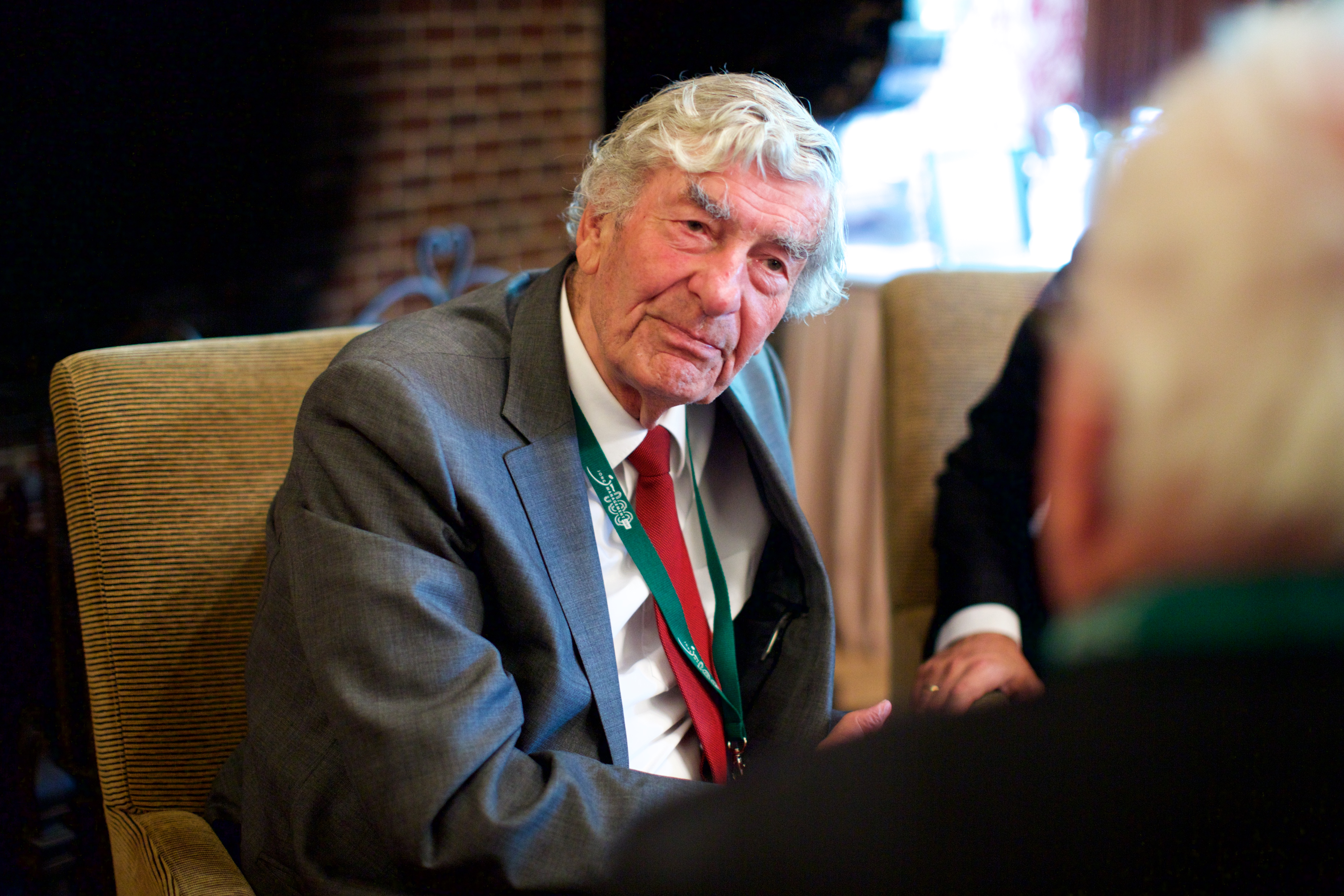
Ruud Lubbers at a symposium on 10 June 2016.

Lubbers asked Max van der Stoel, former High Commissioner on National Minorities, to comment on the confidential report. He concluded that "the OIOS report is deficient in objectivity and impartiality." He added, "that the only two other persons in the room did not provide evidence confirming the version given by the complainant." Furthermore, he accused UN officials of leaking information to the press and recommended that an investigation of the leaks be undertaken.

The Secretary-General reviewed the report and the responses of the High Commissioner and the senior manager to the report, and decided that the complaint could not be substantiated by the evidence and therefore closed the matter." He is also reported to have consulted with Stephen Schwebel, an American judge and former President of the International Court of Justice. The Secretary-General failed to order an investigation of the deliberate leaking by OIOS itself to the media as recommended by Max van der Stoel.

==== Resignation ====
In February 2005, the case was in the news again when the British daily newspaper The Independent obtained a copy of the OIOS report and, accompanied by an article by Kate Holt, published its contents.

Lubbers met with the Secretary-General on 18 February 2005, and resigned as High Commissioner on Sunday, 20 February 2005, stating to the press: "For more than four years I gave all my energy to UNHCR. To be frank, despite all my loyalty, insult has now been added to injury and therefore I resign as High Commissioner." The Secretary-General's office issued a statement the same day which stated that the High Commissioner's resignation was in the best interests of the UNHCR. In his letter of resignation, Lubbers stated that his resignation constituted no expression of guilt, but that he had become the victim of smearing, adding that he had resigned "in the interest of the organisation". In October 2005, Annan reiterated that he had come to the conclusion that "the evidence did not support the accusation" but that, because of ongoing media-pressure, Lubbers' resignation was in the best interests of the UNHCR.

During a farewell meeting for Lubbers as High Commissioner for Refugees, he received from Acting High Commissioner Wendy Chamberlin the first annual UNHCR Achievement Award for exceptional services to UNHCR and for the world's refugees.

In a formal statement, Netherlands Prime Minister Jan Peter Balkenende called the departure of Lubbers "bitter", since the complaint against him had been dismissed as unsustainable.

=== Informateur ===
After the fall of the Second Balkenende cabinet, Lubbers became the informateur for the formation of the demissionary interim Third Balkenende cabinet.

For the 2010 Dutch cabinet formation, after coalition meetings between People's Party for Freedom and Democracy, Labour Party, Democrats 66, and GreenLeft failed to form a new Purple government, Lubbers was asked again to become Informateur to seek possibilities for a new coalition.

== Personal life and death ==
On 10 October 1962, Lubbers married Ria Hoogeweegen (1940–2024) and had two sons and one daughter, Paul, Bart and Heleen. Lubbers lived in the Rotterdam neighbourhood of Kralingen for most of his life and owned a vacation home in Dalfsen from 1995 until his death.

Lubbers died in Rotterdam on 14 February 2018, at the age of 78. Among the world leaders who offered condolences were former President of the Soviet Union Mikhail Gorbachev, Prime Minister of Russia and former President of Russia Dmitry Medvedev, Chancellor of Germany Angela Merkel, Secretary-General of the United Nations and former Prime Minister of Portugal and United Nations High Commissioner for Refugees António Guterres, United Nations High Commissioner for Refugees Filippo Grandi and President of the European Commission and former Prime Minister of Luxembourg Jean-Claude Juncker. His ceremonial funeral was held in Rotterdam on 20 February 2018 and was attended by Prime Minister Mark Rutte and all living former Prime Ministers Dries van Agt, Wim Kok and Jan Peter Balkenende and other high-profile (former) politicians. This was also the last public appearance of his successor as Prime Minister Wim Kok, who himself died eight months later at the age of 80.

In 2024 it was revealed Lubbers died via euthanasia after having been diagnosed with vascular dementia some years prior.

== Decorations ==
=== Honours ===
Honours
Ribbon bar	Honour	Country	Date	Comment
	Knight Grand Cross of the Order of the Netherlands Lion	Netherlands	8 October 1994	Elevated from Knight (11 April 1978)

=== Awards ===
Awards
Ribbon bar	Award	Country	Date
	Honorary citizen of Maastricht	Netherlands	1994
	Four Freedoms Award (Special Presentation)	United States / Netherlands	3 April 1995
	Van Oldenbarneveltpenning of Rotterdam	Netherlands	2003

=== Honorary degrees ===
Honorary degrees
University	Field	City / Country	Date
University of Trás-os-Montes and Alto Douro	Political science and Economics	Vila Real, Portugal	1989
Georgetown University	Law	Washington, D.C., United States	1993
Hankuk University of Foreign Studies	Political science	Seoul, South-Korea	1993
Grand Valley State University	Political science	Allendale, Michigan, United States	1994
Radboud University Nijmegen	Economics	Nijmegen, Netherlands	6 September 2004

Party political offices
Preceded by Willem Aantjes	Leader of the Christian Democratic Appeal in the House of Representatives; 1978–1981	Succeeded by Dries van Agt
Preceded by Dries van Agt	Leader of the Christian Democratic Appeal in the House of Representatives; 1981–1982	Succeeded by Bert de Vries
Preceded by Dries van Agt	Leader of the Christian Democratic Appeal; 1982–1994	Succeeded by Elco Brinkman
Preceded by Bert de Vries	Leader of the Christian Democratic Appeal in the House of Representatives; 1986	Succeeded by Bert de Vries
Preceded by Bert de Vries	Leader of the Christian Democratic Appeal in the House of Representatives; 1989	Succeeded by Elco Brinkman
Political offices
Preceded by Harrie Langman	Minister of Economic Affairs; 1973–1977	Succeeded by Gijs van Aardenne
Preceded by Dries van Agt	Prime Minister of the Netherlands; Minister of General Affairs; 1982–1994	Succeeded by Wim Kok
Preceded by Jan de Koning	Minister for Netherlands Antilles and Aruba Affairs; Acting; 1989	Succeeded by Ernst Hirsch Ballin
Preceded by Ernst Hirsch Ballin	Minister for Netherlands Antilles and Aruba Affairs; 1994	Succeeded by Joris Voorhoeve
Diplomatic posts
Preceded by Sadako Ogata	United Nations High Commissioner for Refugees; 2001–2005	Succeeded by António Guterres
Non-profit organization positions
Preceded by Syed Babar Ali	President of the World Wide Fund for Nature; 1999–2001	Succeeded by Sara Morrison
Preceded by Jan Terlouw	Chairman of the Energy Research Centre of the Netherlands; 2005–2012	Succeeded by Aad Veenman
