= List of King's and Queen's commissioners of Friesland =

This article is a list of King's and Queen's commissioners of the province of Friesland, Netherlands.

== List of King's and Queen's commissioners of Friesland ==
King's and Queen's commissioners of Friesland		Term of office	Party
Idsert Aebinga van Humalda	Jonkheer; Idsert Aebinga van Humalda (1754–1834)	29 April 1814 – 3 November 1826 (12 years, 188 days)	Independent
Jan Adriaan van Zuylen van Nijevelt	Baron; Jan Adriaan van Zuylen van Nijevelt (1776–1840)	16 November 1826 – 29 March 1840 (13 years, 134 days)	Independent
Maurits van Sytzama	Baron; Maurits van Sytzama (1789–1848)	19 October 1840 – 15 July 1848 (7 years, 270 days)	Independent
Jan Ernst van Panhuys	Baron; Jan Ernst van Panhuys (1808–1878)	3 November 1848 – 6 June 1878 (29 years, 215 days)	Independent
Binnert Philip van Harinxma thoe Slooten	Baron; Binnert Philip van Harinxma thoe Slooten (1839–1923)	1 September 1878 – 1 September 1909 (31 years, 0 days)	Independent
Pieter van Harinxma thoe Slooten	Baron; Pieter van Harinxma thoe Slooten (1870–1954)	1 September 1909 – 7 May 1945 (35 years, 248 days)	Independent
	Antoni Haan (1896–1969)	7 May 1945 – 1 December 1945 (208 days)	Anti-Revolutionary; Party
Harry Linthorst Homan	Harry Linthorst; Homan (1905–1989)	1 December 1945 – 1 June 1970 (24 years, 182 days)	Liberal State Party (1945–46)
Harry Linthorst Homan	Harry Linthorst; Homan (1905–1989)	1 December 1945 – 1 June 1970 (24 years, 182 days)	Freedom Party (1946–48)
Harry Linthorst Homan	Harry Linthorst; Homan (1905–1989)	1 December 1945 – 1 June 1970 (24 years, 182 days)	People's Party for Freedom and Democracy (1948–70)
Hedzer Rijpstra	Hedzer Rijpstra (1919–2011)	16 June 1970 – 16 June 1982 (12 years, 0 days)	Christian; Historical Union (1970–80)
Hedzer Rijpstra	Hedzer Rijpstra (1919–2011)	16 June 1970 – 16 June 1982 (12 years, 0 days)	Christian; Democratic; Appeal (1980–82)
Hans Wiegel	Hans Wiegel (1941–2025)	16 June 1982 – 1 February 1994 (11 years, 230 days)	People's Party for Freedom and Democracy
	Kobus Walsma (born 1942)	1 February 1994 – 25 April 1994 (83 days)	Christian; Democratic; Appeal
Loek Hermans	Loek Hermans (born 1951)	25 April 1994 – 3 August 1998 (4 years, 100 days)	People's Party for Freedom and Democracy
Gerard van Klaveren	Gerard van Klaveren (born 1951)	3 August 1998 – 1 January 1999 (151 days)	People's Party for Freedom and Democracy
Ed Nijpels	Ed Nijpels (born 1950)	1 January 1999 – 1 May 2009 (9 years, 121 days)	People's Party for Freedom and Democracy
John Jorritsma	John Jorritsma (born 1956)	1 May 2009 – 12 September 2016 (8 years, 134 days)	People's Party for Freedom and Democracy
Joan Leemhuis-Stout	Joan; Leemhuis-Stout (born 1946)	12 September 2016 – 1 March 2017 (170 days)	People's Party for Freedom and Democracy
Arno Brok	Arno Brok (born 1968)	1 March 2017 – Incumbent (9 years, 240 days)	People's Party for Freedom and Democracy
