= 2010 Dutch cabinet formation =

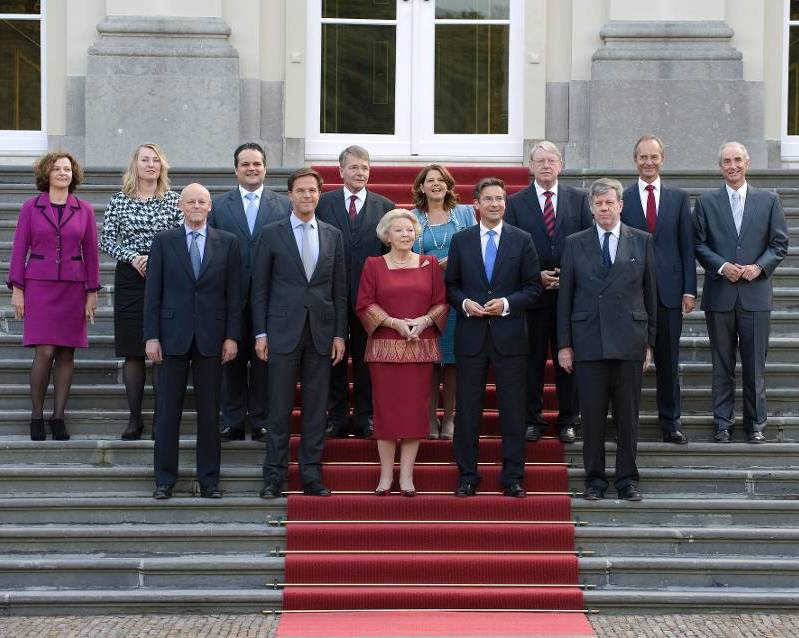
The bordes scene of the ministers of the First Rutte Cabinet with in the middle queen Beatrix at Huis ten Bosch on 14 October 2010.

After the general election of 9 June 2010, a cabinet formation took place in Netherlands. This led to the swearing in of the First Rutte cabinet after 127 days. The cabinet consisted of the conservative liberal People's Party for Freedom and Democracy (VVD) and the Christian Democratic Appeal (CDA), with confidence and supply from the radical right Party for Freedom (PVV).

The formation started with an exploration by informateur Uri Rosenthal and later Herman Tjeenk Willink. Negotiations took place for a purple plus coalition consisting of VVD, Labour Party (PvdA), Democraten 66 (D66) and GroenLinks. Despite advanced talks led by Rosenthal and Jacques Wallage, the talks ended on 20 July.

Informateur Ruud Lubbers then explored a cabinet of VVD and CDA with confidence and supply from PVV. This was negotiated under informateur Ivo Opstelten. Within the CDA parliamentary group there were dissidents against cooperation with the PVV, which caused the PVV to stop the negotiations. Under Tjeenk Willink it was concluded that after the resignation of dissident Ab Klink, the PVV wanted to negotiate again. This was completed on 28 September under the mediation by Opstelten. The parliamentary groups agreed to the agreement, as did the CDA formation conference. Under formateur Mark Rutte, VVD and CDA selected ministers and state secretaries, who were sworn in on 14 October.

== Background ==
=== Election results ===
Composition of the newly elected House of Representatives throughout the cabinet formation: SP (15) PvdD (2) PvdA (30) GL (10) D66 (10) VVD (31) SGP (2) CU (5) CDA (21) PVV (24)

In the elections, the VVD, led by Mark Rutte, became the largest party with 31 seats. The party was closely followed by the PvdA with 30 seats. The CDA – the largest party for the previous eight years – halved from 41 to 20 seats. Due to the major loss, Prime Minister Jan Peter Balkenende resigned as CDA party leader and was succeeded as party leader by Maxime Verhagen. The big winner was the PVV of Geert Wilders, which rose from 9 to 24 seats.

== Informateur Rosenthal ==
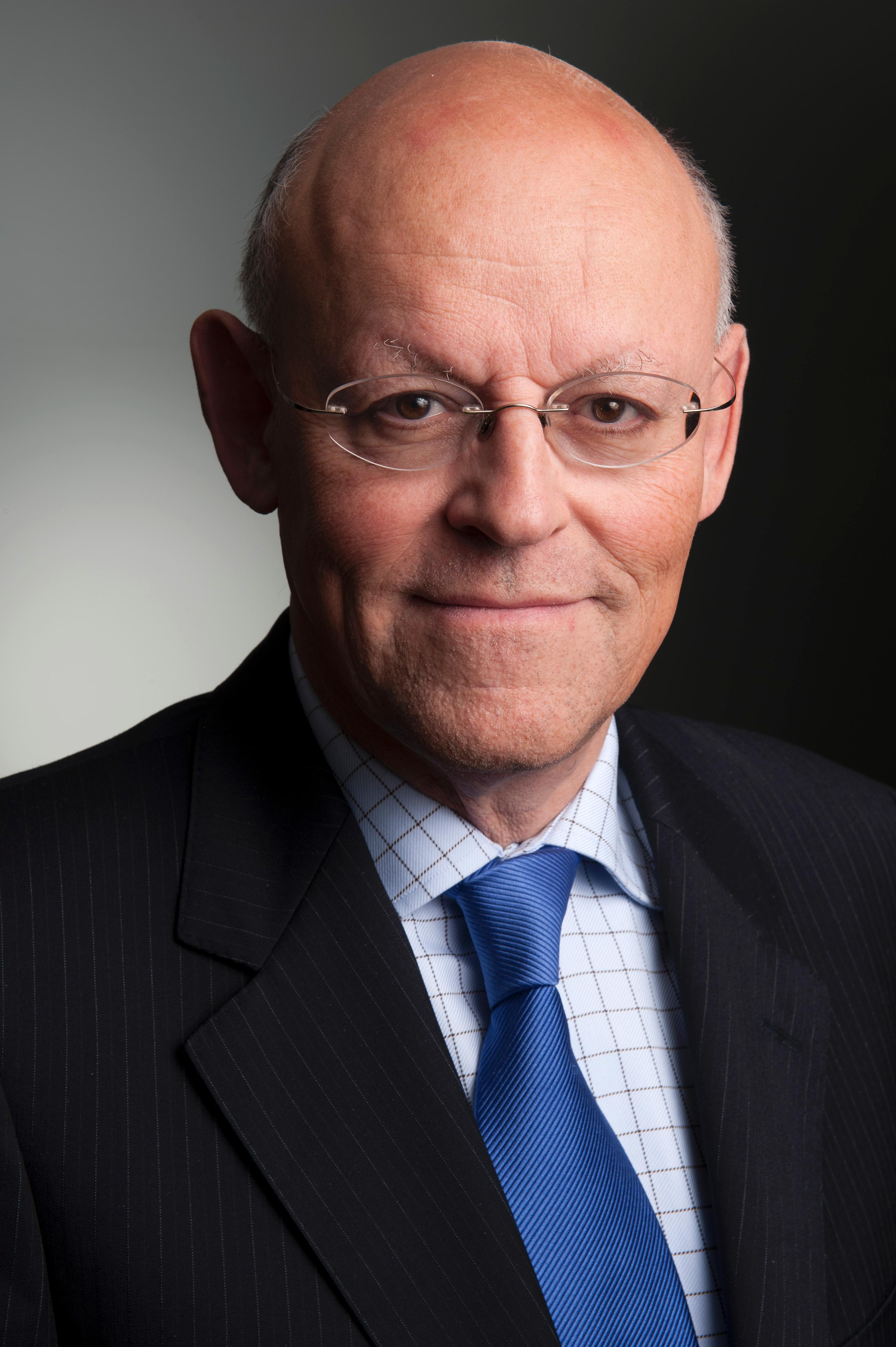
Informateur Uri Rosenthal (VVD). Photo from 2011.

The day after the elections, queen Beatrix met with her permanent advisors; the chairmen of the Senate and the House of Representatives, respectively René van der Linden and Gerdi Verbeet, and the vice president of the Council of State, Herman Tjeenk Willink. Most parliamentary leaders advised her a day later to appoint an informateur of the VVD to investigate a cabinet of VVD, PVV and CDA. On the recommendation of Rutte, VVD parliamentary group leader in the Senate Uri Rosenthal was appointed informateur. His assignment was, "partly in view of the difficult situation our country is in", to investigate in the short term the possibilities for a cabinet "of which the largest party and the biggest winner" are a part. Rosenthal and later informateurs were assisted by advisors – including Kajsa Ollongren – and the director of the Government Information Service Henk Brons.

On 14 June, Rosenthal received the parliamentary leaders. Rutte preferred a coalition of VVD, PVV and CDA, which was the only option for Wilders. Verhagen indicated that the CDA "beholds modesty" when it came to cabinet participation. Verhagen also wanted VVD and PVV to first negotiate the main points before CDA could possibly join. Something that was rejected by Wilders in particular. Except for the Political Reformed Party (SGP), all other parties considered participation in a cabinet with PVV unlikely or ruled it out. Because Verhagen persisted after two more conversations, Rosenthal concluded this information attempt with a report to the queen.

Rosenthal then entered into separate discussions with Rutte, Verhagen, PvdA-leader Job Cohen, D66-leader Alexander Pechtold and GroenLinks-leader Femke Halsema to explore a coalition with their parties. PvdA, D66 and GroenLinks preferred purple plus, consisting of those parties plus VVD. Rutte was not in favor of this coalition due to "major programmatic differences" and concluded after two days of discussions "that there is no perspective for negotiations at the moment".

Rutte's second preference, a middle coalition of VVD, PvdA and CDA, was then explored. Verhagen showed himself willing to participate in discussions "in the national interest", but the option was "undesirable" for PvdA leader Job Cohen. Cohen only wanted to participate in the discussion if D66 and GroenLinks joined (also known as the Rainbow Coalition). This option was not supported by Halsema and Pechtold. Cohen also withdrew the option within an hour. SP leader Emile Roemer suggested a coalition of PvdA, CDA, SP and GroenLinks, but this was rejected by the other leaders. After these failed attempts, Rosenthal sent his final report on 25 June in which he recommended appointing a VVD and a PvdA informateur to find options for a cabinet within the 'broad political centre'.

== Informateur Tjeenk Willink ==
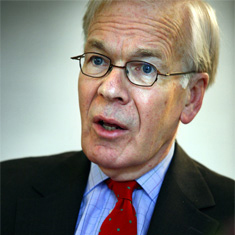
Informateur Herman Tjeenk Willink (PvdA). Photo from 2017.

Following Rosenthal's final report, the queen was advised on 25 June by the parliamentary leaders of 'the broad centre' (VVD, PvdA, CDA, D66, GroenLinks). This did not lead to a clear direction. That same evening, the queen appointed Herman Tjeenk Willink as informateur with the task of informing her "at short notice about the steps that need to be taken to achieve the formation of a cabinet that can count on fruitful cooperation with the States General". On 28 June, Tjeenk Willink met with his predecessor Rosenthal and with the party leaders of the broad centre. Tjeenk Willink's preference for a coalition of those five parties, with an not too detailed agreement and with party leaders in the House, was rejected.

The debate with former informateur Rosenthal took place on 29 June. The subject of the debate was mainly why a cabinet with VVD, PVV and CDA had not proven possible. CDA had not ruled out governing with PVV in the campaign. Verhagen gave the reason for the refusal as "major differences in principle [...] with regard to the democratic constitutional state". Verhagen reiterated that VVD and PVV first had to jointly agree on Wilders' positions such as "head rag tax, the banning of the Koran and the fight against Islam" before CDA joined. Rutte embraced this proposal and invited Wilders seven times during the debate, but Wilders refused.

After a new round of discussions with the five party leaders from the broad centre, Tjeenk Willink once again examined purple plus. Rutte stated that he was willing to discuss this if Cohen lifted his blockade against the middle coalition. Cohen then lifted that blockade. The party leaders of purple-plus met secretly at Tjeenk Willink's home on 1 and 2 July and concluded that the coalition was feasible. VVD and PvdA put forward Rosenthal and Jacques Wallage respectively for the negotiations as informateurs. D66 and GroenLinks advocated alternatives, but ultimately resigned themselves to these informateurs. However, the condition was that both informateurs would not be allowed to take a seat in a possible purple-plus cabinet. On 5 July Tjeenk Willink published his final report with the advice to negotiate about purple-plus.

Tjeenk Willink had written an appendix to his final report in a personal capacity. In it he wrote, among other things, about the integration of foreigners and about European cooperation in the field of police and justice. Wilders thought this was inappropriate for an informateur. He indicated that he no longer wanted Tjeenk Willink as an informateur in the future and inquired whether Tjeenk Willink could be removed as vice-president of the Council of State.

== Informateurs Rosenthal and Wallage ==
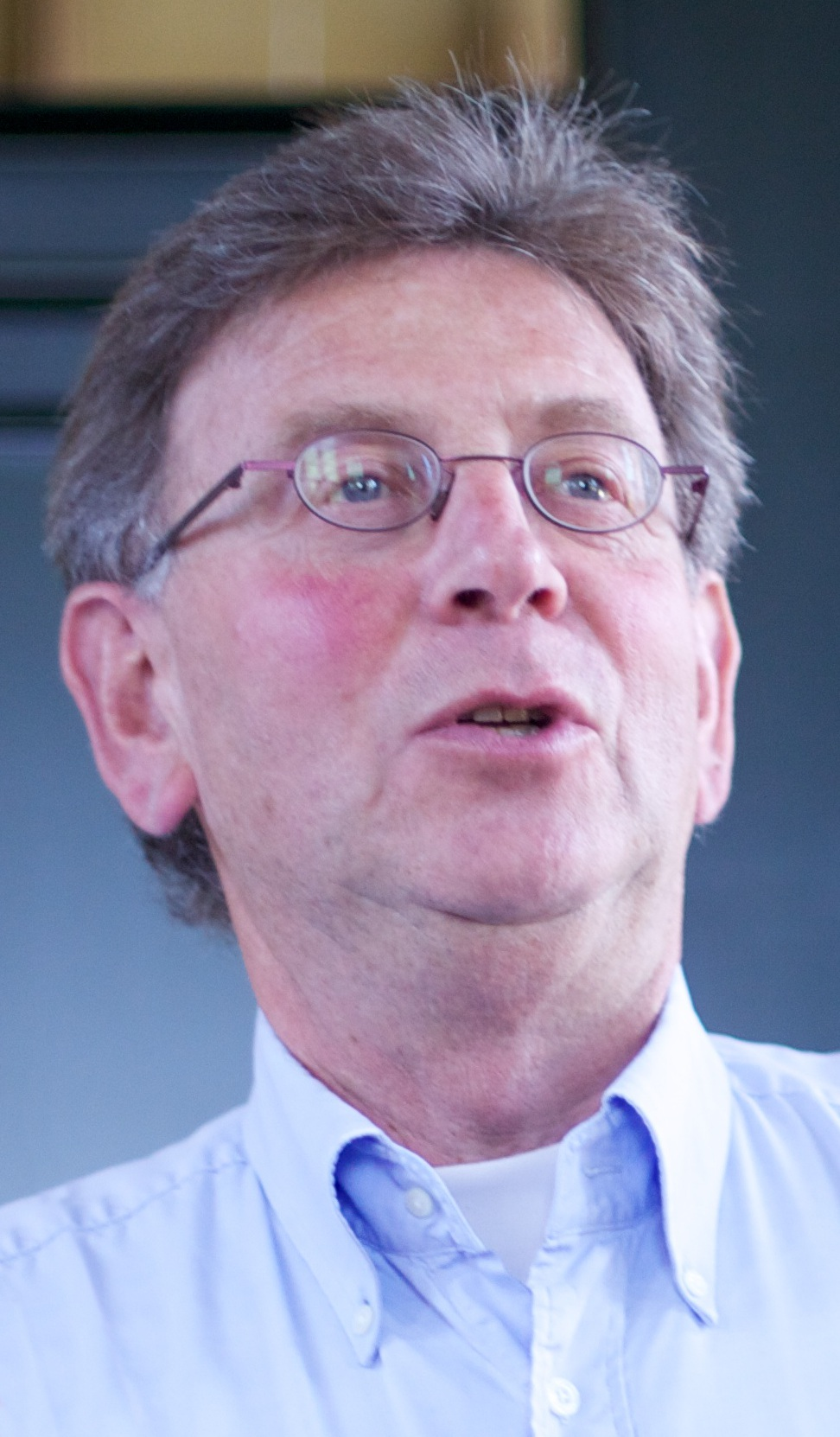
Informateur Jacques Wallage (PvdA). Photo from 2011.

The queen took Tjeenk Willink's advice and appointed Rosenthal and Wallage as informateurs on 5 July. The negotiators agreed to maintain 'radio silence' towards the press and public.

On 12 July, the informateurs spoke to the press and spoke of a "pleasant atmosphere" and a "remarkably good mutual understanding". Especially the atmosphere between contemporaries Rutte, Pechtold and Halsema was excellent and sometimes jolly, according to Halsema in her memoirs. The relationship between the two informateurs, on the other hand, was worse and they were accused of poor direction.

In terms of content, a lot of progress was made at the beginning. The coalition agreement had to be limited in scope and leave room for "free issues", where parliamentary groups could choose for themselves. The cabinet would consist of eight ministers and be housed at the Catshuis. The twelve state secretaries then had to run the departments. Agreement was also reached on reforms to the tax system, labour dismissal law, the Dutch Unemployment Act and cuts in housing construction and defense. The differences also appeared to be bridgeable in the areas of immigration and integration.

However, further relaxation of the labour dismissal law and reform of the home mortgage interest deduction were blocked by PvdA and VVD respectively, as a result of which negotiations stalled. There was also no agreement on the total cuts. Rutte had promised major cuts in his election manifesto and set a minimum of 18 billion in the negotiations, which was not achieved. On Friday 16 July, negotiators and informateurs noted that no progress had been made. It was decided to have a weekend break.

That weekend, Rutte updated his party leadership about negotiations. He received support from the party leadership, despite the fact that 'purple-plus' was not their first preference. However, party prominents such as Hans Wiegel and Henk Vonhoff turned against purple-plus. In the polls, the VVD dropped to 23 seats, while the PVV rose to 35 seats.

On Monday it was concluded that the break had not brought any new insights. The next day, Pechtold commented to Halsema: "Rutte is wearing a tie and a clean shirt and has no paper with him. He is ready to speak to the press." The informateurs attempted to bridge the differences, but at the end of the day both Rutte and Cohen reported that they no longer saw any prospects in the negotiations. A day later, Rosenthal and Wallage submitted their final report to the queen.

== Informateur Lubbers ==
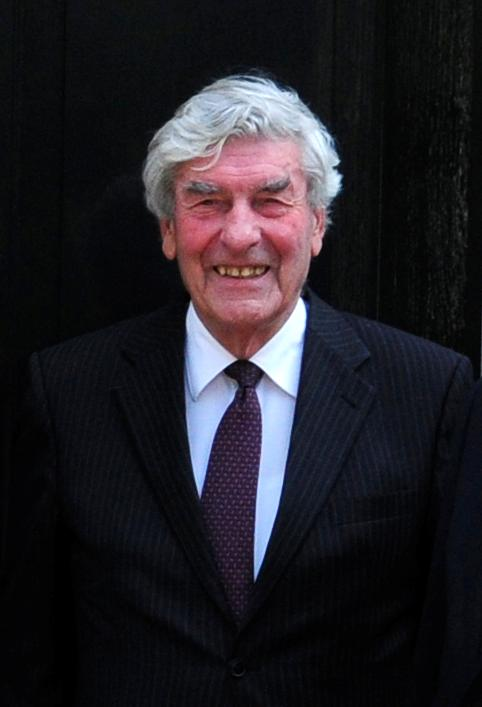
Informateur Ruud Lubbers (CDA). Photo from 2011.

Rosenthal and Wallage had not formulated any advice for next steps. Rutte therefore proposed through the media to write a draft coalition agreement himself, to which other parties could subscribe. Verhagen supported such an assignment, but this plan was advised against by Speaker of the House Gerdi Verbeet. The queen was advised to make another round of visits from all parlementary leaders to explore the options. Tjeenk Willink did not consider himself suitable for this, due to Wilders' commotion regarding his appendix in the previous round. Former CDA Prime Minister and Minister of State Ruud Lubbers was then asked to inform the queen "about the possibilities [...] for the formation of a cabinet that can count on a fruitful collaboration with the States General".

In his conversation with Lubbers, Rutte indicated that he preferred cooperation with CDA and PVV, if necessary with PVV only providing confidence and supply. Cohen believed that this right-wing cabinet should be investigated because the possibility made negotiations about purple-plus more difficult. He again was not enthusiastic about a middle cabinet because it was 'not in the interest of the country'. Halsema also advised exploring a right-wing cabinet, but still hoped for a majority coalition without the PVV. Lubbers warned both Cohen and Halsema that a right-wing cabinet could also succeed.

Wilders also advocated a right-wing cabinet and now preferred the confidence and supply construction. Lubbers – known as a critic of Wilders – asked whether Wilders had any objections if Justice Minister Ernst Hirsch Ballin remained in office, to which Wilders agreed. Lubbers hoped that Hirsch Ballin would be able to tame Wilders. Verhagen advocated a centrecabinet, but was confronted by Lubbers that an option other than the right was not possible. Verhagen indicated that he would first have to discuss this with his party, and only if the PvdA did not cooperate with the centre cabinet. Nevertheless, in consultation with Rutte, Lubbers published a statement immediately after the conversation with Verhagen that VVD, PVV and CDA had to negotiate with each other about a tolerating cabinet without his presence. In the statement, Lubbers himself noted that the confidence and supply construction did not fall within his assignment, which led to criticism from a number of parliamentary leaders. The statement was published before all discussions with parliamentary leaders had been completed, to the dissatisfaction of the leaders who had been passed over.

On 24 July, despite their objections, the CDA parliamentary group unanimously gave the green light for informal talks with Rutte and Wilders. From 26 July, the three parliamentary leaders consulted at the Ministry of Foreign Affairs, where Verhagen was still demissionary minister. In the Declaration of 30 July, the parties acknowledged the "differences of opinion regarding the nature and character of Islam", but "accept each other's differences of opinion on this matter". That is why a cabinet with confidence and supply from the PVV was chosen. The confidence and supply agreement would be limited to topics on which the three could agree, while it was agreed that Wilders could not support motions of censure or no confidence on parts of the coalition agreement.

To the dissatisfaction of Lubbers, who would have liked to remain an informateur himself, the three leaders nominated VVD party chairman Ivo Opstelten as informateur. Lubbers wanted to continue discussions with other parties, but stopped opposing after the weekend. On 3 August, Lubbers presented his final report to the queen with the recommendation that Opstelten be appointed informateur between the three parties.

== Informateur Opstelten ==
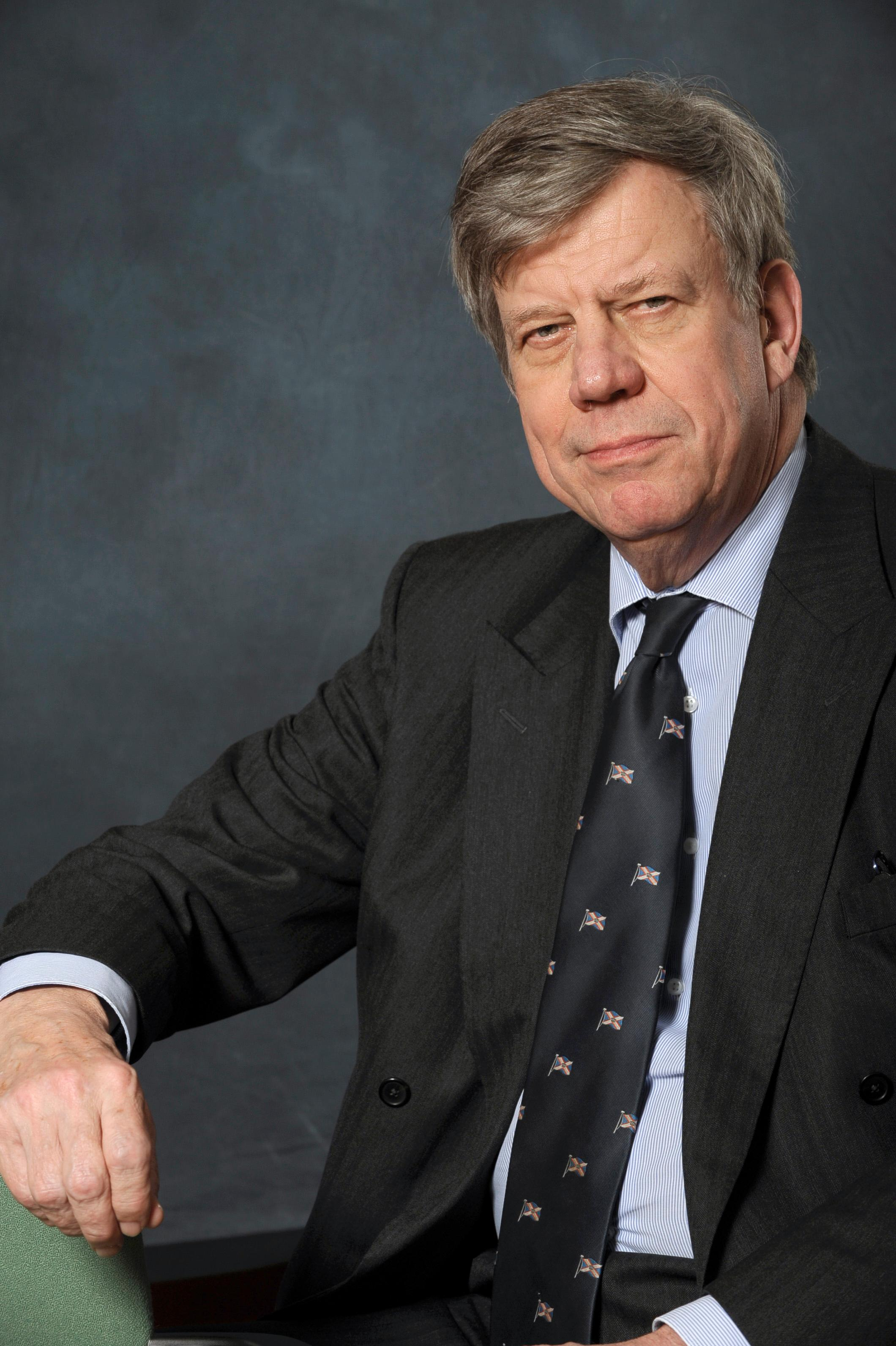
Informateur Ivo Opstelten (VVD). Photo from 2011.

After discussions with her regular advisors on 4 August, the queen adopted the advice to appoint Opstelten as informateur. His assignment was to "initiate research into the rapid establishment of a stable cabinet of VVD and CDA that, with the support of PVV, can count on fruitful cooperation with the States General." In the negotiations, the party leaders were accompanied by members of the House of Representatives Edith Schippers (VVD) and Ab Klink (CDA), and MEP Barry Madlener (PVV).

During the negotiations, several CDA members had doubts about cooperation with the PVV. Within the parliamentary group these were MPs Kathleen Ferrier and Ad Koppejan and candidate MP Jan Schinkelshoek who was already allowed to attend party meetings. The trio, together with candidate MPs Pieter Omtzigt and Hein Pieper, formed the basis of the "Java Council". This group has been meeting weekly since the appointment of informateur Lubbers. Sometimes candidate MP Jack Biskop, Senator Rob van de Beeten and former minister Cees Veerman also took part in the discussions.

Outside the Java Council, there was criticism within the CDA towards cooperation with the PVV, including by former Prime Ministers Dries van Agt and Piet de Jong. Hirsch Ballin even asked Halsema on 17 August for a coalition of VVD, CDA, GroenLinks and ChristenUnie, but despite Halsema's interest, his own party leadership did not agree. There was resistance within the VVD, including from former ministers Joris Voorhoeve, Gijs de Vries, Pieter Winsemius and former Speaker of the House Frans Weisglas, but this remained limited compared to CDA.

=== Dissidents ===
Klink was more critical of cooperation than Verhagen and during the negotiations they clashed more often. This became known to the parliamentary when Klink said at the group meeting on 24 August that he was unhappy with the state of affairs. Verhagen had previously expressed satisfaction with the progress. Klink suggested a time-out, something he had discussed with Hirsch Ballin two days earlier, but received no support for this outside the Java Council. The next day, Klink was replaced once as second by Minister of Finance Jan Kees de Jager, but Klink then continued as negotiator. On August 30, Klink informed Verhagen and Bleker that they would still stop as negotiators. During the night he sent them a letter explaining his struggle. During the day, Schinkelhoek announced that he would renounce his parliamentary seat and Ferrier and Koppejan wrote in a letter that a coalition with the support of the PVV was no longer an option for them.

Members of the party board and parliamentary group board threatened Klink that morning that he would be expelled from the group if he did not conform to the party line. At parliamentary group meeting that afternoon, this was repeated to the three dissident members and Bleker even read out the dismissal procedure. This was experienced as intimidating by the three dissidents. The three stated at the party board the next day that they were prepared to wait for the outcome of the negotiations. The three also had to visit Minister of Social Affairs Piet Hein Donner, who demanded that they sign a statement to commit themselves to the announced CDA congress, which they refused. Ultimately, they agreed to a statement that stipulated that they would consider the outcome of the negotiations and the congress. Klink's letter had now been leaked and after a meeting the parliamentary group announced that there were "major objections", but that they could be removed "based on the content of the outcome of the negotiations". Klink stopped as a negotiator, but remained as a parliamentary group member.

=== End of negotiations ===
The negotiating party leaders met again on 2 September, after negotiations had come to a standstill due to the problems at CDA. Despite promises from Verhagen, Wilders doubted whether the CDA would provide all the necessary seats to the coalition. He demanded from Verhagen that the dissidents would draw up a written statement stating that they would comply with a yes from the CDA congress. Even though Donner had previously demanded something similar, Verhagen indicated that he could not demand this for constitutional reasons. The next day, Wilders ended the discussions because he had no confidence in the CDA parliamentary group. On 4 September, Opstelten delivered his final report, in which he concluded that a stable cabinet of VVD and CDA with support from PVV had not proven possible.

Immediately after the negotiations ended, Rutte nominated himself again as an informateur to write a draft for a coalition agreement. On 6 September, Rutte also asked whether the centre coalition of VVD, PvdA and CDA was an option, which Verhagen and Cohen were prepared to do. That same day, Klink announced that he would resign as a Member of Parliament, because he said he could no longer function credibly in the parliamentary group. Verhagen confirmed after the parliamentary group meeting that "something has certainly changed due to the departure of Mr Klink", but it was still too early for Wilders to reopen negotiations. The next day, Wilders reversed his position after his party meeting and was prepared to negotiate with VVD and CDA.

== Informateur Tjeenk Willink (2) ==
Although it became clear during a debate on 7 September that there was a majority in favor of continuing the negotiations between VVD, CDA and PVV, the queen had already sought advice from the party leaders before Wilders' turn. She believed she could only base herself on final reports from informateurs and advice from the parliamentary leaders. That same evening, she therefore offered the position of informateur to Rutte for a test in accordance with previous advice. However, when Rutte refused, Tjeenk Willink was again appointed informateur to "inform at the shortest possible time about the current situation and the steps that need to be taken". This decision was seen as too formal and a "penalty round".

Tjeenk Willink held discussions with the party leaders on 8 and 9 September, in which VVD, PVV, CDA and SGP again argued for a coalition of VVD, PVV and CDA. Tjeenk Willink tried to get more guarantees about stability from the three parties, but did not receive these. The three party leaders had confidence in a successful outcome of the negotiations, just like Opstelten, with whom Tjeenk Willink also spoke. On 13 September, Tjeenk Willink presented his final report. This took longer because on 11 September Wilders gave a speech at a demonstration against an Islamic center near Ground Zero. This speech was eagerly awaited in view of its possible role as a cabinet partner. Ultimately, this speech was milder than feared according to commentators.

== Informateur Opstelten (2) ==
In his final report, Tjeenk Willink recommended resuming negotiations with VVD, PVV and CDA under the leadership of informateur Opstelten, which was taken over by the queen the same day. The negotiations resumed under radio silence, this time with Ank Bijleveld as Verhagen's second.

When negotiating, individual MPs were taken into account in order to increase the chance of their support. For example, Koppejan was allowed to influence the formulation of the depoldering of the Hertogin Hedwigepolder, which Koppejan was strongly against. The independent Zeeland member of Provincial council Johan Robesin talked about this. For PVV MP Dion Graus the coalition agreement announced the 'animal cops' with fifty officers. A number of SGP's wishes were met, because with a narrow majority in the House of Representatives and no majority in the Senate, they may be needed in the future.

On 28 September, negotiators reached a final agreement, despite a disappointing calculation of the draft coalition agreement by the Central Planning Bureau. The agreements were presented to the groups the next morning. VVD and PVV agreed at the end of the afternoon.

During the CDA meeting, the agreements were discussed in more detail. Ferrier and Koppejan ultimately voted against in the final vote. Verhagen, Bijleveld and Bleker then withdrew for consultation. Ferrier and Koppejan were left in a room for hours after another confrontation with Verhagen. They called their supporters Schinkelshoek, Van de Beeten and Hirsch Ballin, while Camiel Eurlings arrived to reportedly calm Verhagen. Bijleveld, Bleker and party board member Tony de Bos occasionally visited the two dissidents to present new joint draft statements. Ferrier and Koppejan refused, but ultimately agreed to a statement in which they indicated that they would wait with their final decision until after the party congress. At three o'clock in the morning the parliamentary group met again, which again degenerated into fits of crying and reproaches towards the dissidents. To prevent further escalation, Bleker ended the meeting. At a quarter to four in the morning, Verhagen spoke to the press to report that 'the vast majority' agreed, and that the entire parliamentary group would give the congress a heavy weight in the final decision.

The next morning, the three party leaders discussed the comments of their groups. Verhagen managed to remove Wilders' target of halving the influx of non-Western immigrants in the migration paragraph – which he called 'a shit paragraph'. After this consultation, the agreements were published and explained by the group leaders.

=== CDA formation congress ===
Shortly after taking office in June, CDA party chairman Bleker had announced a conference where members could vote on government participation. On 2 October, the CDA formation congress agreed to government participation with 68% of the votes. Despite the large majority in favor of governing with the PVV, Koppejan and Ferrier felt supported by a large minority that was against governing. On 5 October, the CDA parliamentary group agreed to cabinet participation. Despite objections from parliamentary group members, it was explicitly stated that Ferrier and Koppejan would look critically at the elaboration of the agreements.

That same evening, Koppejan and Ferrier were guests on the radio program Met het Oog op Morgen. Koppejan said there that they wanted to expose Wilders and Wilders was made happy with a 'dead sparrow' because some agreements were contrary to international treaties. The next day Ferrier and Koppejan had to visit Verhagen, where they were asked whether they still supported the statement, which they confirmed. Rutte also contacted Koppejan by telephone. Verhagen reconfirmed the support of all CDA group members towards Rutte and Wilders, which Rutte and Wilders accepted. In the evening, Opstelten published his final report, in which he recommended appointing Rutte as formateur.

== Formateur Rutte ==
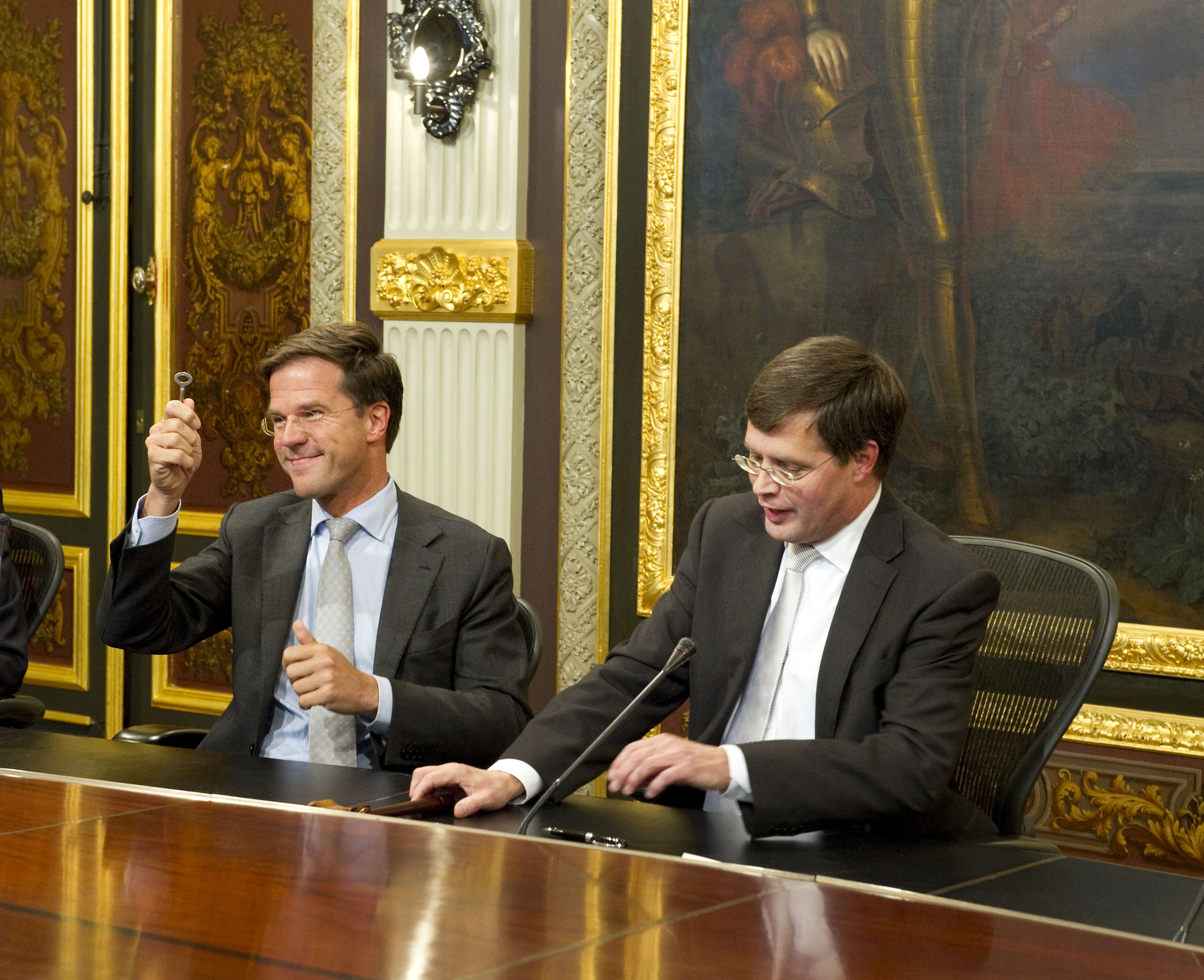
Prime Minister Mark Rutte (left) receiving the key to the Torentje from outgoing Prime Minister Jan Peter Balkenende (right)

On 7 October, Mark Rutte was appointed formateur by the queen. The twelve ministerial positions - four fewer than the previous cabinet - and eight state secretariats were divided equally between the VVD and the CDA. Rutte spoke with the proposed ministers between 8 and 13 October. Intended Minister for Immigration, Integration and Asylum Gerd Leers also had to come for an interview with Wilders at the insistence of Verhagen, because he was in had been very critical of Wilders in the past. On 14 October, the First Rutte cabinet was sworn in by the queen.

== Aftermath ==
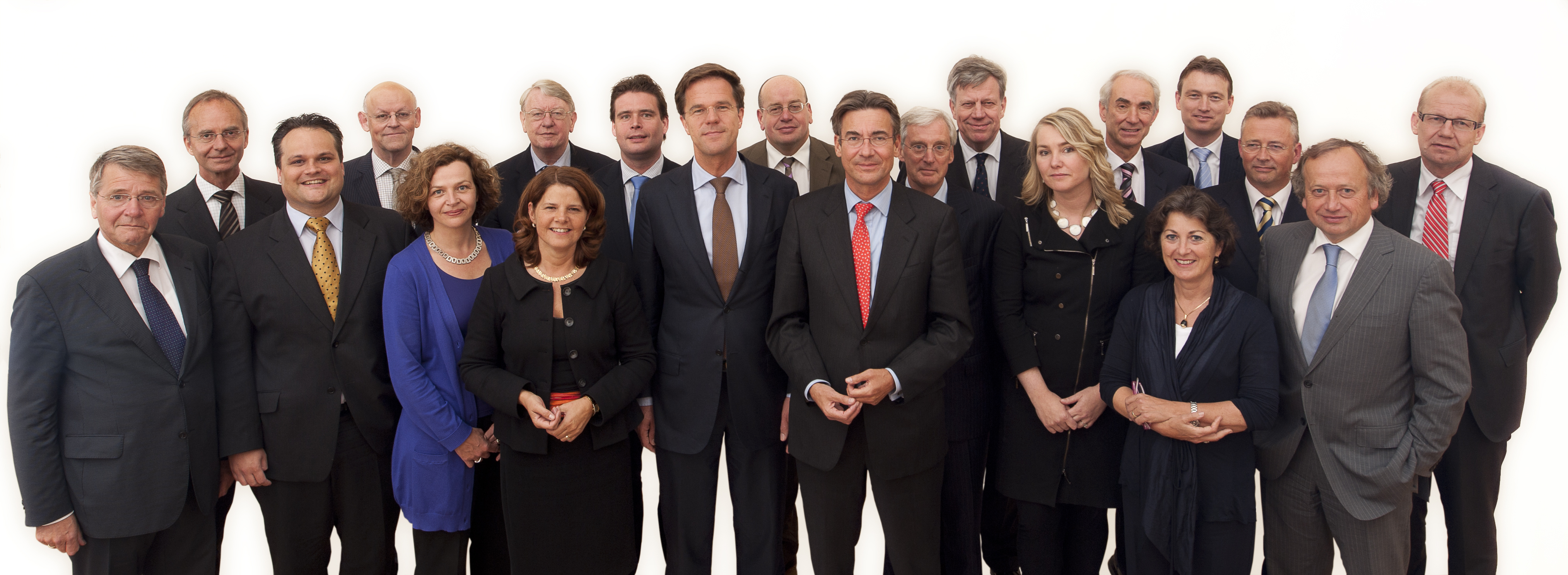
Ministers and state secretaries of the first Rutte cabinet

Lubbers later turned against this coalition. Behind the scenes, he encouraged Minister Leers to create a crisis to bring down the cabinet.

The cabinet had 76 seats in the House, but lost that majority on 20 March 2012 after Hero Brinkman split off. He did indicate that he would continue to support the cabinet. However, just over a month later, the cabinet fell. On 21 April 2012, Wilders withdrew from the discussions on the 2013 budget. That same day, Wilders also indicated that his party would no longer provide confidence and supply. Two days later, the cabinet offered its resignation.

=== Role of the monarch in cabinet formations ===
There was dissatisfaction about the role of Queen Beatrix during the formation. In particular the appointment of Lubbers on 21 July and the appointment of Tjeenk Willink in September. The PVV had the impression that these appointments were politically motivated and aimed against them. In 2012, the PVV therefore supported the proposal to limit the role of the head of state in the formation process. This proposal was submitted by D66 and further supported by SP, PvdA, PvdD and GroenLinks. Since then, (in)formateurs are no longer appointed by the head of state and the head of state is only informed about the progress.
