= Vestia =

Vestia may refer to:

- Vestia (gastropod), a genus of snails in the family Clausiliidae
- Vestia (plant), a monotypic genus in the family Solanaceae
- Vestia (public housing organization), a Dutch housing organization
