= Loek Hermans =

Dutch politician

- Hermans in 1995

Parliamentary leader in the Senate
- In office 22 February 2011 – 3 November 2015
- Preceded by: Fred de Graaf
- Succeeded by: Helmi Huijbregts-Schiedon
- Parliamentary group: People's Party for Freedom and Democracy

Member of the Senate
- In office 12 June 2007 – 3 November 2015
- Parliamentary group: People's Party for Freedom and Democracy

Member of the Social and Economic Council
- In office 1 July 2003 – 1 February 2011
- Chairman: See list: Herman Wijffels (2003–2006) Alexander Rinnooy Kan (2006–2011)

Minister of Education, Culture and Science
- In office 3 August 1998 – 22 July 2002
- Prime Minister: Wim Kok
- Preceded by: Jo Ritzen
- Succeeded by: Maria van der Hoeven

Queen's Commissioner of Friesland
- In office 25 April 1994 – 3 August 1998
- Monarch: Beatrix
- Preceded by: Hans Wiegel
- Succeeded by: Ed Nijpels

Mayor of Zwolle
- In office 16 September 1990 – 25 April 1994
- Preceded by: Gauke Loopstra
- Succeeded by: Jan Franssen

Member of the House of Representatives
- In office 23 May 2002 – 25 July 2002
- In office 8 June 1977 – 24 September 1990
- Parliamentary group: People's Party for Freedom and Democracy

Personal details
- Born: Louis Marie Lucien Henri Alphonse Hermans; 23 April 1951 (age 75) Heerlen, Netherlands
- Party: People's Party for Freedom and Democracy (from 1969)
- Spouse: Edith van Dijk (m. 1979; died 2014)
- Children: Sophie Hermans (born 1981); Caroliene Hermans (born 1983); 2 other daughters
- Education: Radboud University Nijmegen (Bachelor of Public Administration, Master of Public Administration)
- Occupation: Politician · Civil servant · Businessman · Corporate director · Nonprofit director · Trade association executive · Media administrator · Academic administrator · Sport administrator · Lobbyist · Teacher

Louis Marie Lucien Henri Alphonse "Loek" Hermans (born 23 April 1951) is a retired Dutch politician of the People's Party for Freedom and Democracy (VVD) and businessman.

== Biography ==
Hermans attended a Gymnasium in Kerkrade from April 1964 until May 1970 and applied at the Radboud University Nijmegen in June 1970 majoring in Public administration obtaining a Bachelor of Public Administration degree in July 1972 before graduating with a Master of Public Administration degree in July 1976. Hermans worked as a civics teacher in Arnhem from August 1972 until July 1976. Hermans served on the Municipal Council of Nijmegen from 3 September 1974 until 5 September 1978.

Hermans was elected as a Member of the House of Representatives after the election of 1977, taking office on 8 June 1977 serving as a frontbencher and spokesperson for Civil service and Public administration. In September 1990 Hermans was nominated as Mayor of Zwolle, he was installed as Mayor on 16 September 1990 and resigned as a Member of the House of Representatives on 24 September 1990. In April 1994 Hermans was nominated as the next Queen's Commissioner of Friesland, he resigned as Mayor the same day he was installed as Queen's Commissioner, taking office on 25 April 1994. After the election of 1998 Hermans was appointed Minister of Education, Culture and Science in the Cabinet Kok II, taking office on 3 August 1998. The Cabinet Kok II resigned on 16 April 2002 following the conclusions of the NIOD report into the Srebrenica massacre during the Bosnian War and continued to serve in a demissionary capacity. After the election of 2002 Hermans returned as a Member of the House of Representatives, taking office on 23 May 2002. Following the cabinet formation of 2002 Hermans was not giving a cabinet post in the new cabinet, the Cabinet Kok II was replaced by the Cabinet Balkenende I on 22 July 2002 and he continued to serve in the House of Representatives until his resignation on 22 July 2002.

Hermans semi-retired from national politics and became active in the private sector and public sector and occupied numerous seats as a corporate director and nonprofit director on several boards of directors and supervisory boards (Vestia, Public Pension Funds PFZW, Heeren Zeventien Friesland association and CARE) and served on several state commissions and councils on behalf of the government (Centraal Orgaan opvang asielzoekers, Reclassering in Nederland, National Archives and the Social and Economic Council). Hermans also worked as a trade association executive for the MKB-Nederland serving as chairman of the executive board from 1 July 2003 until 9 February 2011 and for the Nederlands Uitgeversverbond serving as chairman of the executive board from 10 December 2002 until 1 November 2012. Hermans also worked as media administrator for the public broadcaster WNL serving as chairman of the supervisory board from 16 February 2009 until 15 April 2013 and as a sport administrator for SC Heerenveen and as an academic administrator for the Radboud University Nijmegen serving as Chairman of the Education board since 1 May 2008. Hermans was elected as a Member of the Senate after the Senate election of 2007, taking office on 12 June 2007 serving as a frontbencher chairing the parliamentary committee for the Interior and the parliamentary committee for Constitutional Affairs and spokesperson for Royal House affairs. Hermans was selected as Parliamentary leader of the People's Party for Freedom and Democracy in the Senate following the appointment of Uri Rosenthal as Minister of Foreign Affairs in the Cabinet Rutte I, taking office on 22 February 2011. On 3 November 2015 Hermans resigned after a judicial verdict of mismanagement at Meavita, a health care organisation where Hermans served as Chairman of the Supervisory board when the organisation went bankrupt in 2009.

== Decorations ==
Honours
Ribbon bar	Honour	Country	Date	Comment
	Knight of the Order of the Netherlands Lion	Netherlands	28 April 1989	
	Grand Officer of the Order of Leopold II	Belgium	12 May 1999	
	Knight of the Order of the Holy Sepulchre	Holy See	1 November 1999	
	Knight Commander of the Order of Merit	Germany	1 February 2001	
	Officer of the Order of Orange-Nassau	Netherlands	10 December 2002	

Party political offices
Preceded by Gijs van Aardenne	Deputy Leader of the People's Party for Freedom and Democracy; 1986–1990; With: Rudolf de Korte (1986–1989)	Succeeded by Hans Dijkstal
Preceded by Fred de Graaf	Parliamentary leader of the People's Party for Freedom and Democracy in the Senate; 2011–2015	Succeeded by Helmi Huijbregts-Schiedon
Political offices
Preceded by Gauke Loopstra	Mayor of Zwolle; 1994–1998	Succeeded by Jan Franssen
Preceded by Hans Wiegel	Queen's Commissioner of Friesland; 1994–1998	Succeeded by Ed Nijpels
Preceded by Jo Ritzen	Minister of Education, Culture and Science; 1998–2002	Succeeded by Maria van der Hoeven
Civic offices
Preceded by Aad Kosto	Chairman of the Supervisory board of the Probation Agency; 2003–2007	Succeeded by Ed Nijpels
Unknown	Chairman of the Supervisory board of the Centraal Orgaan opvang asielzoekers 2006–2011	Unknown
Unknown	Chairman of the Supervisory board of the National Archives; 2008–2016	Unknown
Business positions
Unknown	Chairman of the Executive Board of the Nederlands Uitgeversverbond; 2002–2012	Succeeded by Wiet de Bruijn
Preceded by Hans de Boer	Chairman of the Executive Board of the MKB-Nederland; 2003–2011	Succeeded by Hans Biesheuvel
Media offices
Preceded by Office established	Chairman of the Supervisory board of WNL; 2009–2013	Succeeded by Bas Eenhoorn
Academic offices
Unknown	Chairman of the Education board of the Radboud University Nijmegen; 2008–present	Incumbent
