= Fred de Graaf =

Dutch politician (born 1950)

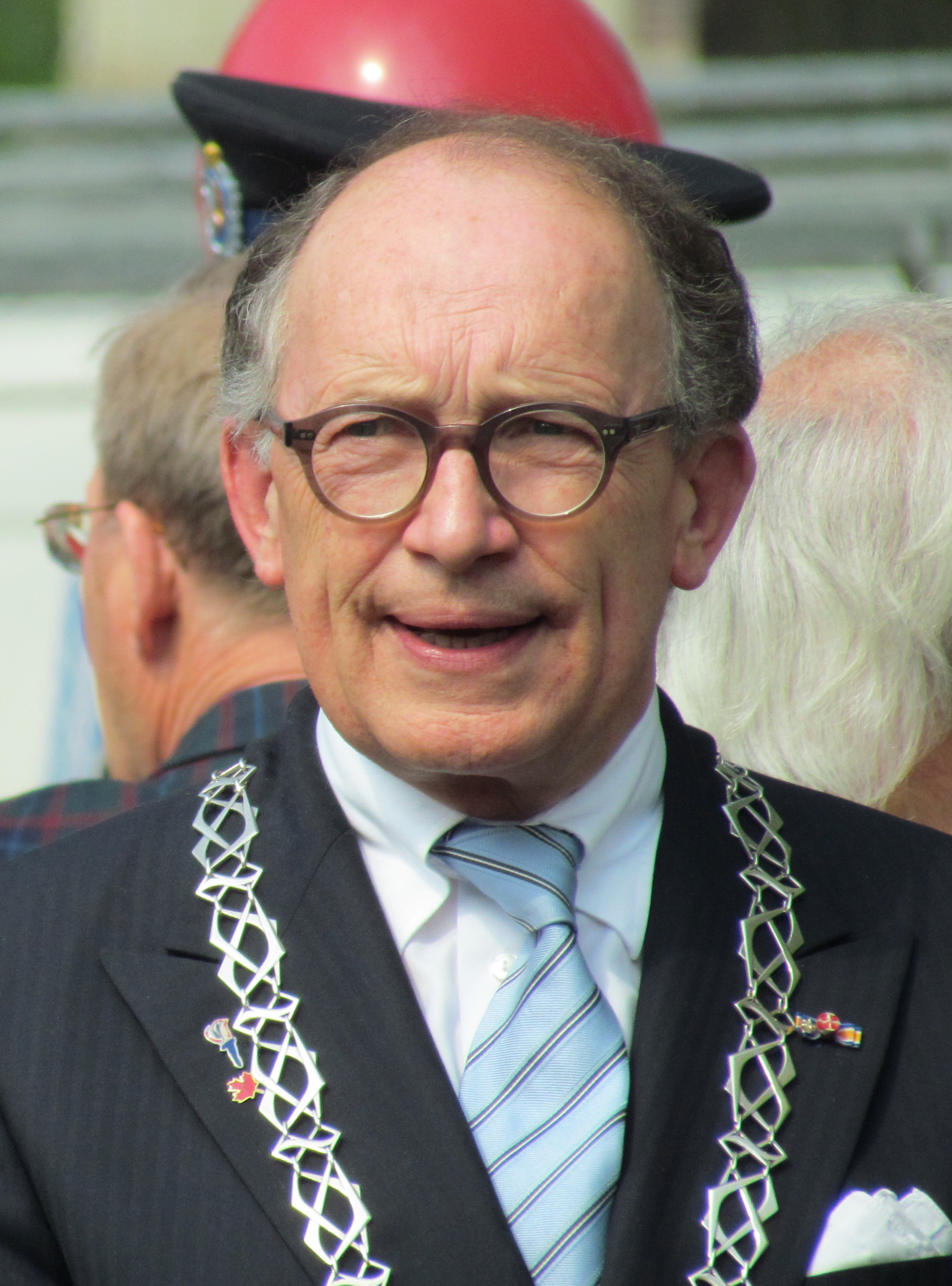
- De Graaf in 2011

Mayor of Heerde
- In office 16 October 2017 – 1 January 2019; Acting
- Preceded by: Inez Pijnenburg
- Succeeded by: Jacqueline Koops-Scheele

Mayor of Enschede
- In office 1 January 2015 – 1 October 2015; Acting
- Preceded by: Peter den Oudsten
- Succeeded by: Onno van Veldhuizen

Mayor of Amstelveen
- In office 1 January 2014 – 3 July 2014; Acting
- Preceded by: Jan van Zanen
- Succeeded by: Mirjam van 't Veld

Mayor of Bronckhorst
- In office 1 October 2013 – 1 January 2014; Ad interim
- Preceded by: Henk Aalderink
- Succeeded by: Henk Aalderink

President of the Senate
- In office 28 June 2011 – 2 July 2013
- Preceded by: René van der Linden
- Succeeded by: Ankie Broekers-Knol

Parliamentary leader in the Senate
- In office 14 October 2010 – 15 February 2011
- Preceded by: Uri Rosenthal
- Succeeded by: Loek Hermans
- Parliamentary group: People's Party for Freedom and Democracy

Member of the Senate
- In office 10 June 2003 – 9 June 2015
- Parliamentary group: People's Party for Freedom and Democracy

Mayor of Apeldoorn
- In office 16 February 1999 – 1 October 2011
- Preceded by: Harm Bruins Slot
- Succeeded by: Hans Esmeijer

Mayor of Udenhout
- In office 16 September 1996 – 1 January 1997; Ad interim
- Preceded by: Wim Dijkstra
- Succeeded by: Gerrit Brokx (as Mayor of Tilburg)

Mayor of Helvoirt
- In office 1 October 1995 – 1 January 1996; Ad interim
- Preceded by: Piet Berkhout
- Succeeded by: Hans Haas (as Mayor of Haaren)

Mayor of Vught
- In office 16 January 1989 – 16 February 1999
- Preceded by: Dirk Reitsma
- Succeeded by: Iz Keijzer

Mayor of Leersum
- In office 16 June 1981 – 16 January 1989
- Preceded by: Hans Goudsmit
- Succeeded by: Cokkie Feith-Hooijer

Personal details
- Born: Godefridus Jan de Graaf; 28 February 1950 (age 76) Roosendaal, Netherlands
- Party: People's Party for Freedom and Democracy (since 1976)
- Spouse: Harma van Buizen (m. 1973)
- Children: 2 daughters
- Education: University of Groningen (Bachelor of Laws, Master of Laws)
- Occupation: Politician · Civil servant · Jurist · Nonprofit director

Godefridus Jan "Fred" de Graaf (born 28 February 1950) is a retired Dutch politician of the People's Party for Freedom and Democracy (VVD) and jurist.

De Graaf a jurist by occupation, worked as a civil servant for the Ministry of the Interior from 1975 until 1981. He was as a member of the municipal council of Voorschoten from 1978 to 1981. Afterwards he served as Mayor of Leersum from 16 June 1981 until 16 January 1989 when he became Mayor of Vught, serving until 16 February 1999 when he became Mayor of Apeldoorn, serving until his resignation on 1 October 2011. He served as the Parliamentary leader of the People's Party for Freedom and Democracy in the Senate from 14 October 2010 until 15 February 2011. In the Dutch Senate election of 2011, the People's Party for Freedom and Democracy won the most seats and De Graaf was selected as next President of the Senate. De Graaf announced his resignation as President of the Senate of the Netherlands following criticism on his neutrality; he remained in office until Ankie Broekers-Knol was elected as successor. He presided the coronation of King Willem-Alexander on 30 April 2013.

== Decorations ==
=== National ===
- Officer of the Order of Orange-Nassau (30 April 2011)
- Knight of the Order of Orange-Nassau (16 April 1997)

=== Foreign ===
- Japan: Gold Rays with Neck Ribbon (Third Class) of the Order of the Sacred Treasure (12 May 2000)

Party political offices
Preceded by Uri Rosenthal	Parliamentary leader of the People's Party for Freedom and Democracy in the Senate; 2010–2011	Succeeded by Loek Hermans
Political offices
Preceded by Hans Goudsmit	Mayor of Leersum; 1981–1989	Succeeded by Cokkie Feith-Hooijer
Preceded by Dirk Reitsma	Mayor of Vught; 1989–1999	Succeeded by Iz Keijzer
Preceded by Piet Berkhout	Mayor of Helvoirt; Ad interim 1995–1996	Succeeded by Hans Haas as Mayor of Haaren
Preceded by Wim Dijkstra	Mayor of Udenhout; Ad interim 1996–1997	Succeeded by Gerrit Brokx as Mayor of Tilburg
Preceded by Harm Bruins Slot	Mayor of Apeldoorn; 1999–2011	Succeeded by Hans Esmeijer
Preceded by René van der Linden	President of the Senate; 2011–2013	Succeeded by Ankie Broekers-Knol
Preceded by Henk Aalderink	Mayor of Bronckhorst; Ad interim 2013–2014	Succeeded by Henk Aalderink
Preceded by Jan van Zanen	Mayor of Amstelveen; Acting; 2014	Succeeded by Mirjam van 't Veld
Preceded by Peter den Oudsten	Mayor of Enschede; Acting; 2015	Succeeded by Onno van Veldhuizen
Preceded by Inez Pijnenburg	Mayor of Heerde; Acting; 2017–2019	Succeeded by Jacqueline Koops-Scheele
Non-profit organization positions
Preceded by Frank Schreve	Chairman of the Supervisory board of the Hoge Veluwe National; Park Foundation; 2016–present	Incumbent
Preceded by Cees van den Vlekkert	Chairman of the Supervisory board of the Airborne Museum Hartenstein; 2019–present	Incumbent
