= Saeftinghe =

Lost town in Zeeland, Netherlands

Coordinates: 51°21′13″N 4°9′54″E

Designations

Ramsar Wetland
- Official name: Westerschelde & Saeftinghe
- Designated: 9 April 1995
- Reference no.: 748

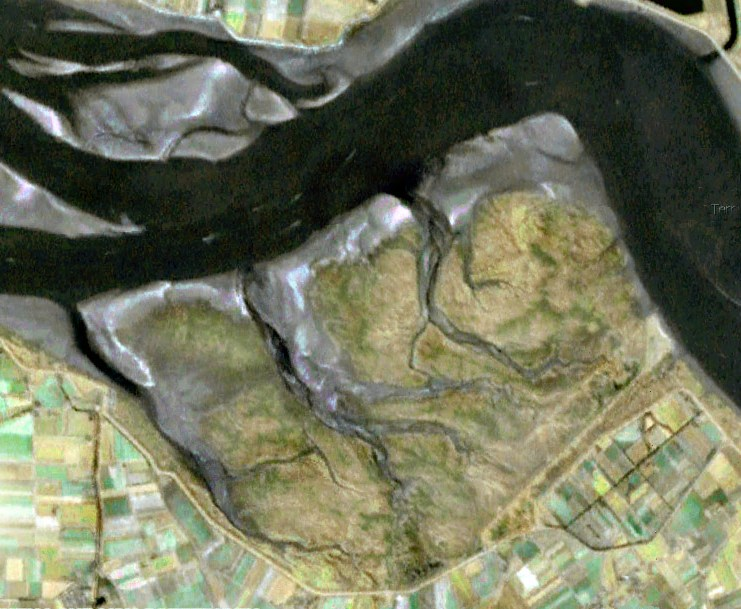
Saeftinge satellite picture

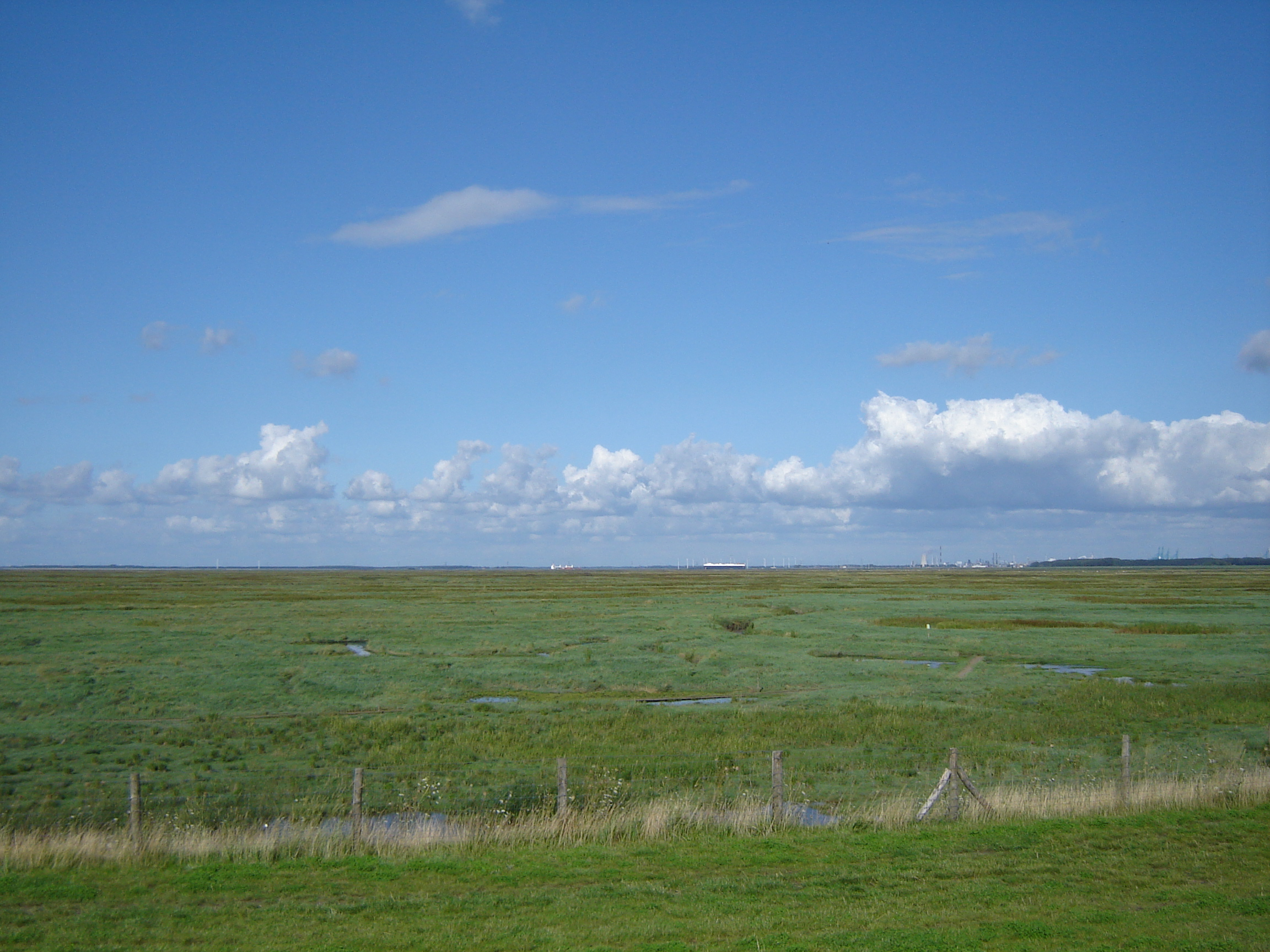
View on Emmadorp

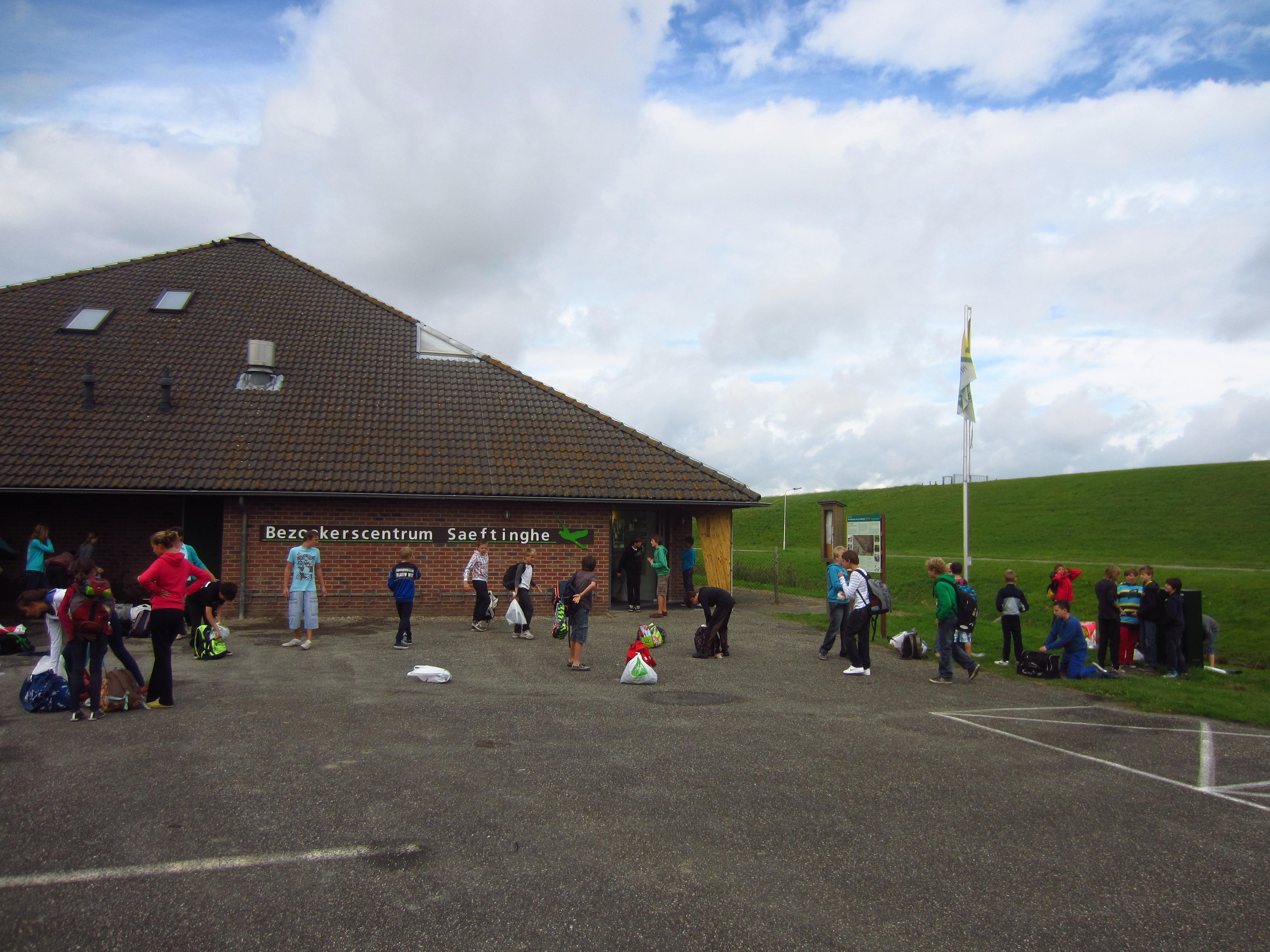
Visitor center Drowned Land of Saeftinghe

Saeftinghe or Saaftinge was a town in the southwest Netherlands, located in eastern Zeelandic Flanders, near Nieuw-Namen. It existed until 1584. It is now a swamp known as the Drowned Land of Saeftinghe (Dutch: Verdronken Land van Saeftinghe) and an official nature reserve area. The land is a crosspoint where the river Scheldt meets the salty waters of the North Sea in the estuary Western Scheldt. It is a treacherous place where the tides easily consume large stretches of land in a matter of seconds and must not be explored without an experienced guide.

== History ==
Saeftinghe was drained in the 13th century under the management of the abbey of Ter Doest. Willem van Saeftinghe was one of the best known occupants of the abbey and gave his name to the stretch of land claimed from the sea. Up to 1570, the land was very fertile polder. Agriculture, peat burning and trade turned Saeftinghe into one of the most prosperous places in the region. There were several additional settlements nearby: Namen, Sint-Laureins, Stampaert, Weele (Sint-Marie), Sint-Laureijns and Casuwele.

The settlements were mostly small villages with just a few houses and huts, but there was also Saeftinghe Castle, built in 1279. Today all is buried beneath several layers of clay and sand due to several floods over the years. Large bricks were found at several places inland. Those bricks were probably remainders of the abbey used by the villagers to build their houses when the abbey was destroyed due to several floods. Today some of those bricks can be seen in the nearby Visitors Center.

Most of the land around the town was lost in the All Saint's flood of 1570 (the Allerheiligenvloed). Four years later the drowned land reached into what is now Belgium. Only Saeftinghe and some surrounding land managed to remain dry.

In 1584, during the Eighty Years' War, Dutch soldiers found themselves forced to destroy the last intact dike and Saeftinghe sank into the waters of the Scheldt. Attempts to reclaim the area were made throughout history; the most serious project taking place in 1907, but even then only the Hertogin Hedwigepolder was conquered from the sea. Nowadays a hamlet is located within the reclaimed portions of land, called Emmadorp. Saaftinge itself has never been retrieved. In 1970, all of the area was incorporated into the municipality of Hulst, when Graauw en Langendam and Clinge ceased to exist.

Within the historical municipal limits, Saaftinge today has a population of 55. The flag consists of a blue lion rampant on a white field. The lion originates from the personal shield of Willem van Saeftinghe.

== The legend ==
A legend of Saeftinghe attributes the All Saint's flood to capturing a mermaid and not setting her free. This caused the region to be cursed by the merman, and led to the flood that destroyed the towns of Sint-Laureins, Namen and Casuwele, killing all inhabitants. The legend holds that a tower bell calls for help from the sunken town. Another Saeftinghe legend holds the belief that visitors of the area and inhabitants of the nearby village of Emmadorp sometimes see 'ghosts' in the fog. According to the legend the ghosts are the spirits of the inhabitants of the three towns killed in the flood.

== Visitor centre ==
A visitor centre opened in Emmadorp in 1997, from where excursions to the nature reserve depart. From 1997 to 2007, an average of around 12,000 visitors per year went on excursions.

== See also ==
- Lost city
