= Saeftinghe Castle =

Castle in Saeftinghe, the Netherlands

- Kasteel van Saeftinghe
- Saeftinghe, the Netherlands
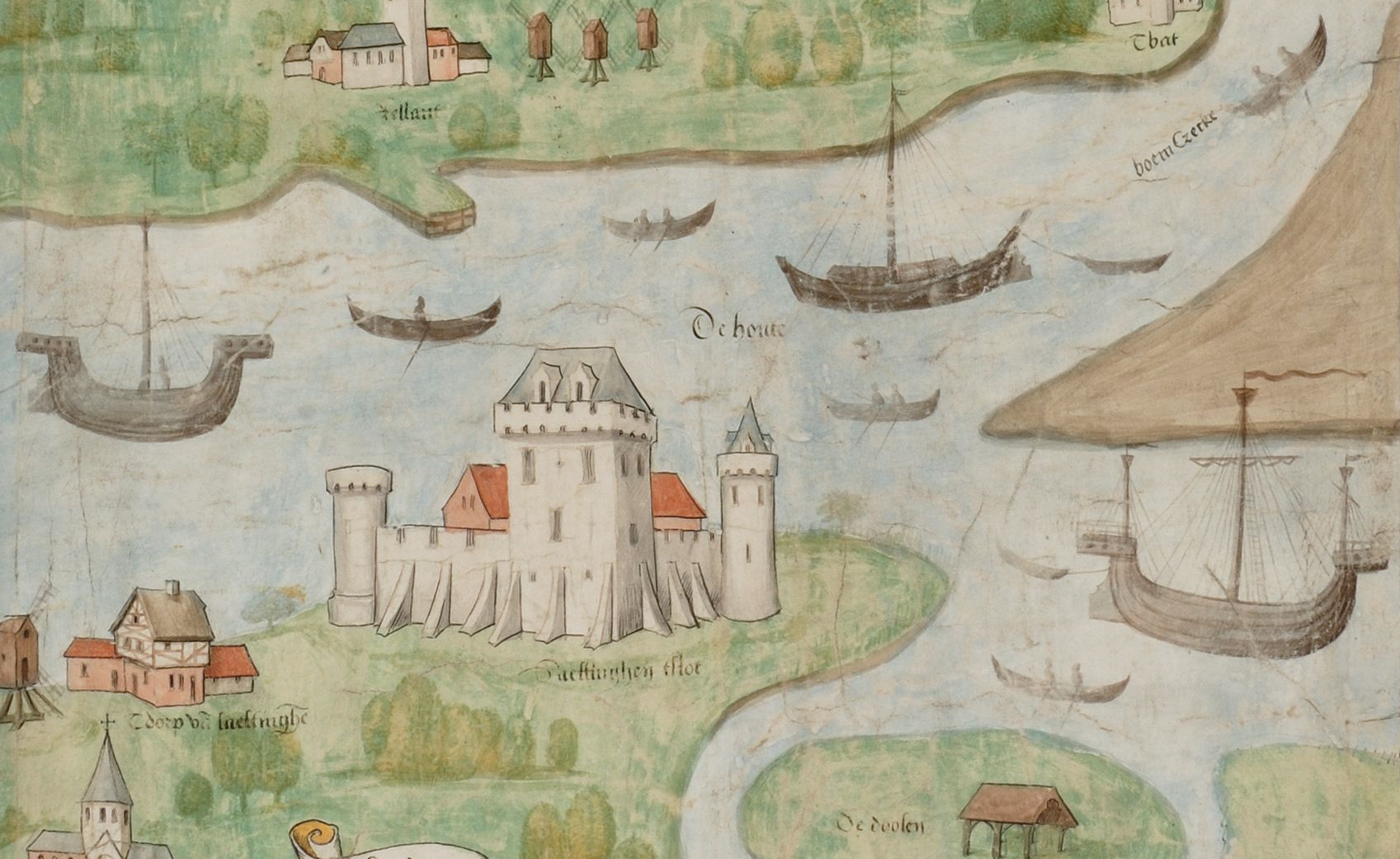
- Saeftinghe Castle in 1505. The Western Scheldt is to the left, Eastern Scheldt top right, and Scheldt bottom right.

Site information
- Type: Water castle
- Open to the public: No, location unsure

Location
- The Netherlands
- Coordinates: 51.375229°N 4.201803°E

Site history
- Built: Second half 13th century
- Materials: brick
- Demolished: flooded in the 16th century

Saeftinghe Castle was a castle on the northeast tip of the drowned land of Saeftinghe. It was destroyed by flooding in the 16th century, and now its exact location is unknown.

== Location ==
The location of Saeftinghe Castle, and indeed the history of the drowned land of Saeftinghe, is closely connected to changes in the local waterways. In early medieval times, the Western Scheldt, or Honte was not yet connected to the Scheldt, which flowed to the North Sea by what is now known as the Eastern Scheldt. Even in 1250-1300 fishermen could only use the Honte at high tide.

In the late 14th and early 15th century, a number of floods opened a connection from the Honte / Western Scheldt to the Scheldt. This led to the rise of Antwerp as the commercial center of the Netherlands. Even so, the connection to Antwerp over the Western Scheldt remained problematic for the larger Hanze ships till way into the 16th century. Saeftinghe Castle was built in 1279, at the place where the Honte / Westerschelde split of from the Scheldt. This was a strategic location, but also an excellent location to levy toll on the Honte.

== Castle Characteristics ==
=== Depictions ===
Not much is known about the characteristics of Saeftinghe Castle. The ruins are now probably deep in the Western Scheldt. The castle was depicted on the so-called Scheldekaart van Rupelmonde tot aan het Zwin en het eiland Walcheren from 1468, and the Scheldekaart van Rupelmonde tot aan de zee from 1504/05. On the 1468 map it was named Casteel van Scaftyngen, on the 1504/05 map it was named Saeftinghen tslot.

=== First phase: Motte and bailey castle ===
Saeftinghe Castle probably started as a Motte-and-bailey castle. In account from 1293, there is a reference to a steen, and some houses beneath it. The word steen is an old medieval word for a stone (not brick) building, see e.g. the Gravensteen in Ghent. The houses beneath it, indicate that it stood on an elevation. Therefore, it can be concluded that in its first phase, Saeftinghe Castle was a Motte-and-Bailey castle. In 1296 a 230 m long moat was dug around the castle.

=== Second phase: Square water castle ===
The depiction on both maps is similar. They show a square castle with a square main tower and two round towers. The fourth corner was a wing with living quarters. On the 1468 map the depiction is on a piece of paper that has been glued onto the map. As other castles on the maps (Beveren, Halsteren and Rupelmonde) were depicted rather accurately, it can be assumed that this also applies to Saeftinghe Castle. Furthermore, for the time of construction, location and purpose, such a square castle is a not unlikely construction.

An account from 1375-1376 refers to covering four towers of the castle. There was a house for the toll collector, a small galley with sail and four oarsmen, a small boat. In 1394 a new construction phase started.

An interesting detail are the buttresses on the outside of the walls. These would diminish the defensive value of the castle, and were therefore normally on the inside of the castle walls. However, these outside buttresses were also seen at Borselen Castle. A likely explanation is that these served to keep up the walls in case the grounds shifted due to flooding.

== History ==
=== The lordship Saeftinghe ===
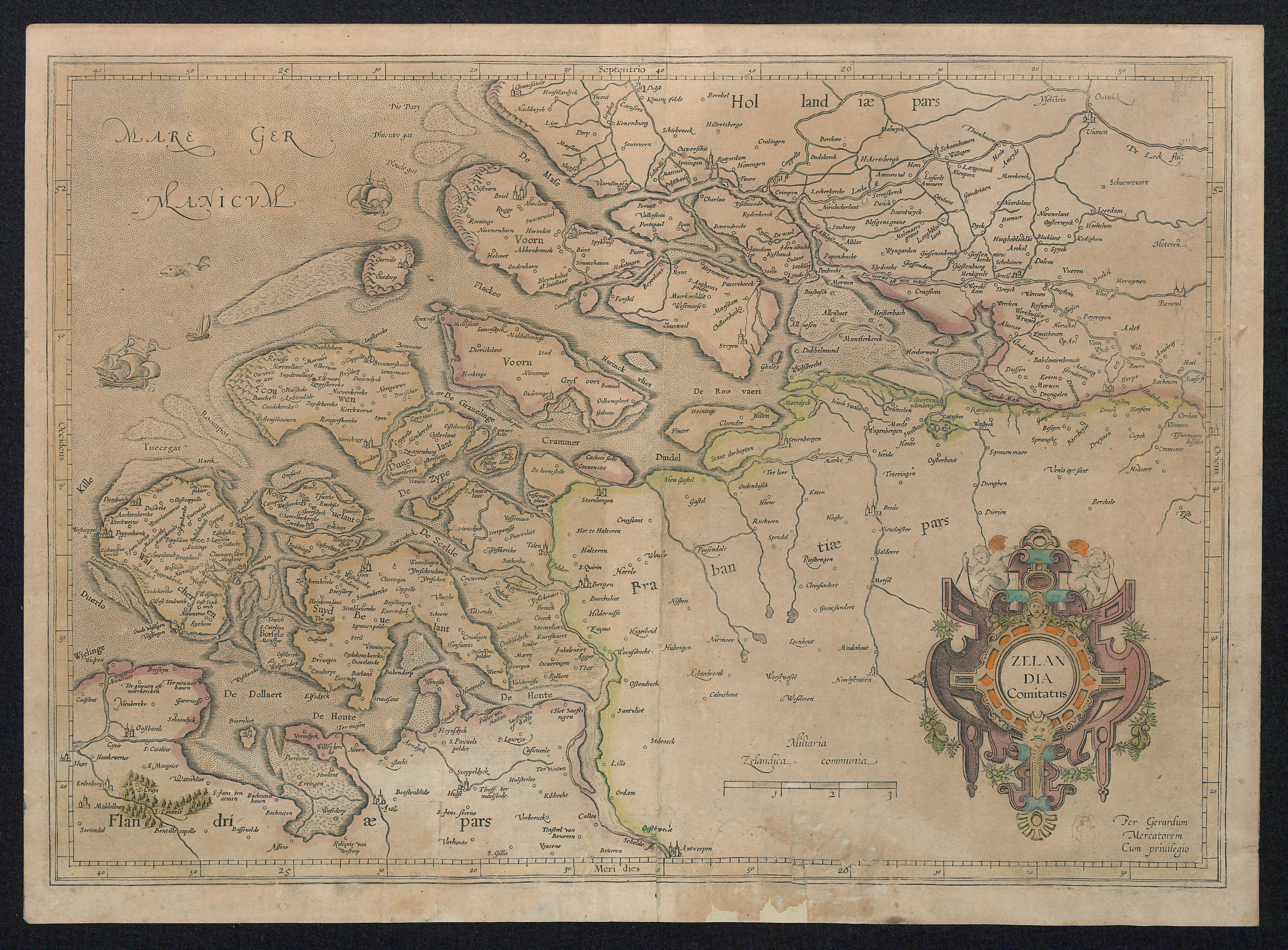
Saeftinghe Castle on a c. 1630 map

The lordship Saeftinghe was first mentioned in 821, when it was gifted to the Bishop of Utrecht. From the place names, it can be deduced that it was populated by Frisians. Laterm the convents in the area created polders.

In 1261 Margaret II, Countess of Flanders bought the area. In 1263 she made it a free lordship by giving it its own charter, the Keure van Saefthinghe. It is often said that in 1279 Saeftinghe Castle was built by her as a fortress, but a reference for this year cannot be found. Furthermore, on 29 December 1278 she left the government to her son Gwijde. A better construction date is between 1263, when it would have been mentioned if it existed, and 1293, when it was mentioned.

At Saeftinghe Castle toll was levied on the Western Scheldt, and according to some also on the Eastern Scheldt. In 1288 a new dike was made to create the Nieuwlandpolder. Saefthinghe Castle was in the Oudelandpolder. It might be that the first location of Saeftinghe town was also in the Oudelandpolder, and that it was later moved to become Saeftinghe village at a new location.

=== Outside the dikes ===
During the 14th century, most of the dikes around Saeftinghe Castle were destroyed. At least after 1365-1369, Saeftinghe Castle came to lie on a Gors, that is an area outside the dikes that is normally not flooded with the tide. To protect it, a ring dike was constructed around the castle.

During the Revolt of Ghent (1379–1385), knight Hector van Voorhoute commanded at Saeftinghe Castle. At one time, there were 4 squires, 10 bowmen and 20 pike men guarding the castle. In 1382 those of Ghent besieged the castle.

In 1411 Saeftinghe Castle was still in the same situation. In 1420 there was still a castellan on the castle. Somewhat later, the Count of Flanders sold the area to Ten Duinen Abbey. The area around the castle was not included. It was a square area of about 450 by 450 meters. About 80 meters east of the castle was a harbor. The abbey made new polders in the area, but these did not included the castle, which continued behind its ring dike. From 1375 to 1539 there were many reports of damage to this dike.

In 1452 the castle garrison marched out against those of Ghent, but was severely beaten. At about the same time it got extra fortifications. In 1484 and somewhat later Maximilian of Austria constructed a new fortress or fortifications near the castle. The mention of 250 footmen and 40 cavalry gives the idea that these were more modern fortifications.

=== Becomes Ruinous ===
On a map from the first half of the 16th century, the castle is depicted as a ruin. In 1539 the ring dike was almost completely washed away by a storm. It was restored, but in 1552 it was again severely damaged. This time, only provisional repairs were made.

=== Flooding ===
The All Saints' Flood of 1570 marked the beginning of the end for the whole land of Saeftinghe. At first the dikes were repaired, but a financial crisis, and the early phases of the Eighty Years' War doomed it. In 1583 and 1584 the rebels destroyed the first dikes in order to keep control of the Scheldt. After they lost Antwerp in 1585, the whole of Zeelandic Flanders was inundated. Near the castle, the Saeftinghse Gat was formed. The Saeftinghse Gat and the others that were formed, were hard to close, because they were left open for such a long time. By 1584 the Saeftinghse Gat had washed away much of the castle ruins.

== Lost ==
The exact location of Saeftinghe castle is not known. A fisherman said that he walked over the 3 m thick foundation in 1906. It was said to have been 300 m north of the old Schaapskooi. The remains were visible right up to World War II, but these were no longer seen after 1963. In January 2001 an attempt was made to determine the exact location of the castle, but it was not found.
