= Hans Wiegel =

Dutch politician (1941–2025)

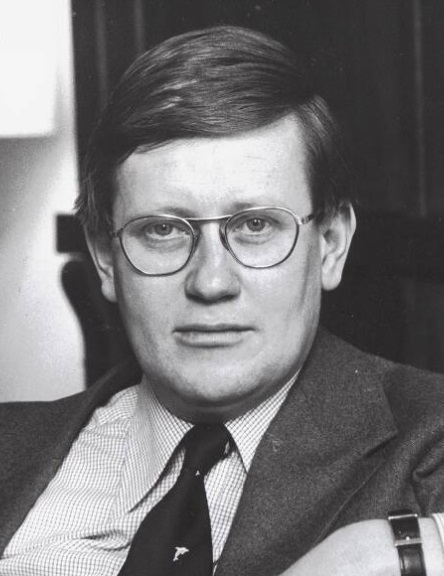
- Wiegel in 1977

Member of the Senate
- In office 13 June 1995 – 1 April 2000

Queen's Commissioner of Friesland
- In office 16 June 1982 – 1 February 1994
- Monarch: Beatrix
- Preceded by: Hedzer Rijpstra
- Succeeded by: Loek Hermans

Deputy Prime Minister of the Netherlands
- In office 19 December 1977 – 11 September 1981
- Prime Minister: Dries van Agt
- Preceded by: Gaius de Gaay Fortman
- Succeeded by: Joop den Uyl; Jan Terlouw

Minister of the Interior
- In office 19 December 1977 – 11 September 1981
- Prime Minister: Dries van Agt
- Preceded by: Gaius de Gaay Fortman
- Succeeded by: Ed van Thijn

Parliamentary leader in the House of Representatives
- In office 25 August 1981 – 20 April 1982
- Preceded by: Koos Rietkerk
- Succeeded by: Ed Nijpels
- In office 6 July 1971 – 19 December 1977
- Preceded by: Molly Geertsema
- Succeeded by: Koos Rietkerk
- Parliamentary group: People's Party for Freedom and Democracy

Leader of the People's Party for Freedom and Democracy
- In office 1 July 1971 – 20 April 1982
- Preceded by: Molly Geertsema
- Succeeded by: Ed Nijpels

Member of the House of Representatives
- In office 25 August 1981 – 1 May 1982
- In office 18 April 1967 – 19 December 1977

Personal details
- Born: 16 July 1941 Amsterdam, German-occupied Netherlands
- Died: 19 May 2025 (aged 83) Sint Nicolaasga, Netherlands
- Party: People's Party for Freedom and Democracy (from 1963)
- Spouses: Pien Frederiks (m. 1973; died 1980) Marianne Frederiks (m. 1982; died 2005)
- Domestic partner: Madelon Spoor (2006–2010)
- Children: Erik Wiegel (born 1975); Marieke Wiegel (born 1977)
- Education: University of Amsterdam (Candidate)
- Occupation: Politician; businessperson; corporate director; nonprofit director; trade association executive; lobbyist; political pundit; columnist; author
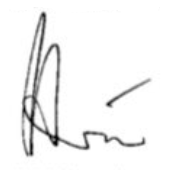
- Signature

Hans Wiegel (Dutch: [ɦɑns ˈʋiɣəl]; 16 July 1941 – 19 May 2025) was a Dutch politician of the People's Party for Freedom and Democracy (VVD) and businessman.

Wiegel studied Law at the University of Amsterdam before switching to Political science obtaining a Bachelor of Social Science degree and worked as a freelance political pundit from July 1965 until April 1967. Wiegel also served as chairman of the Youth Organisation Freedom and Democracy from November 1965 until October 1966. Wiegel became a member of the House of Representatives shortly after the 1967 general election, taking office on 18 April 1967. After the 1971 general election, party leader and parliamentary leader Molly Geertsema was appointed Deputy Prime Minister and Minister of the Interior in the Biesheuvel I cabinet, and announced he was stepping down. Wiegel was unanimously selected as his successor, taking office on 1 July 1971. For the 1972 and 1977 general elections, Wiegel served as lead candidate, and following a successful cabinet formation with Christian Democratic leader Dries van Agt formed the Van Agt–Wiegel cabinet, with Wiegel appointed Deputy Prime Minister and Minister of the Interior taking office on 19 December 1977.

For the 1981 general election, Wiegel again served as lead candidate, but the following cabinet formation resulted in a coalition between the Christian Democrats and the Labour Party, and Wiegel returned to the House of Representatives as parliamentary leader on 25 August 1981. In April 1982, Wiegel unexpectedly announced he was stepping down as leader following his nomination as the next Queen's Commissioner of Friesland and endorsed "rising star" Ed Nijpels as his successor. He served as Queen's Commissioner from 16 June 1982 until 1 February 1994. Wiegel also became active in the private and public sectors as a corporate and non-profit director, served on several state commissions and councils on behalf of the government, and worked as a trade association executive serving as chairman of the Dutch Brewers Association from August 1984 until November 2012, the Dutch Healthcare Insurance Association from February 1994 until February 2012 and the Dutch Travel Companies Association from May 1994 until June 1995 and as vice chairman of the employers' organisation VNO-NCW from May 2008 until February 2012. Wiegel continued to be active in politics and was elected to the Senate after the 1995 Senate election, taking office on 13 June 1995. In March 2000, Wiegel unexpectedly announced his retirement and resigned from the Senate on 1 April 2000.

Wiegel semi-retired from active politics at 58 but continued to be active in the private and public sectors as a corporate and non-profit director and lobbyist. He worked as a occasional mediator for coalition agreements and political crises, and as a political pundit and columnist for De Telegraaf, Algemeen Dagblad and WNL. Wiegel was known for his abilities as a skilful debater and effective negotiator and continued to comment on political affairs as a statesman until he suffered a minor stroke in August 2019 which forced him to undergo rehabilitation. He holds the distinction as the second youngest-serving party leader and parliamentary leader at the age of 29 and the youngest-serving Deputy Prime Minister at the age of 36.

== Early life ==
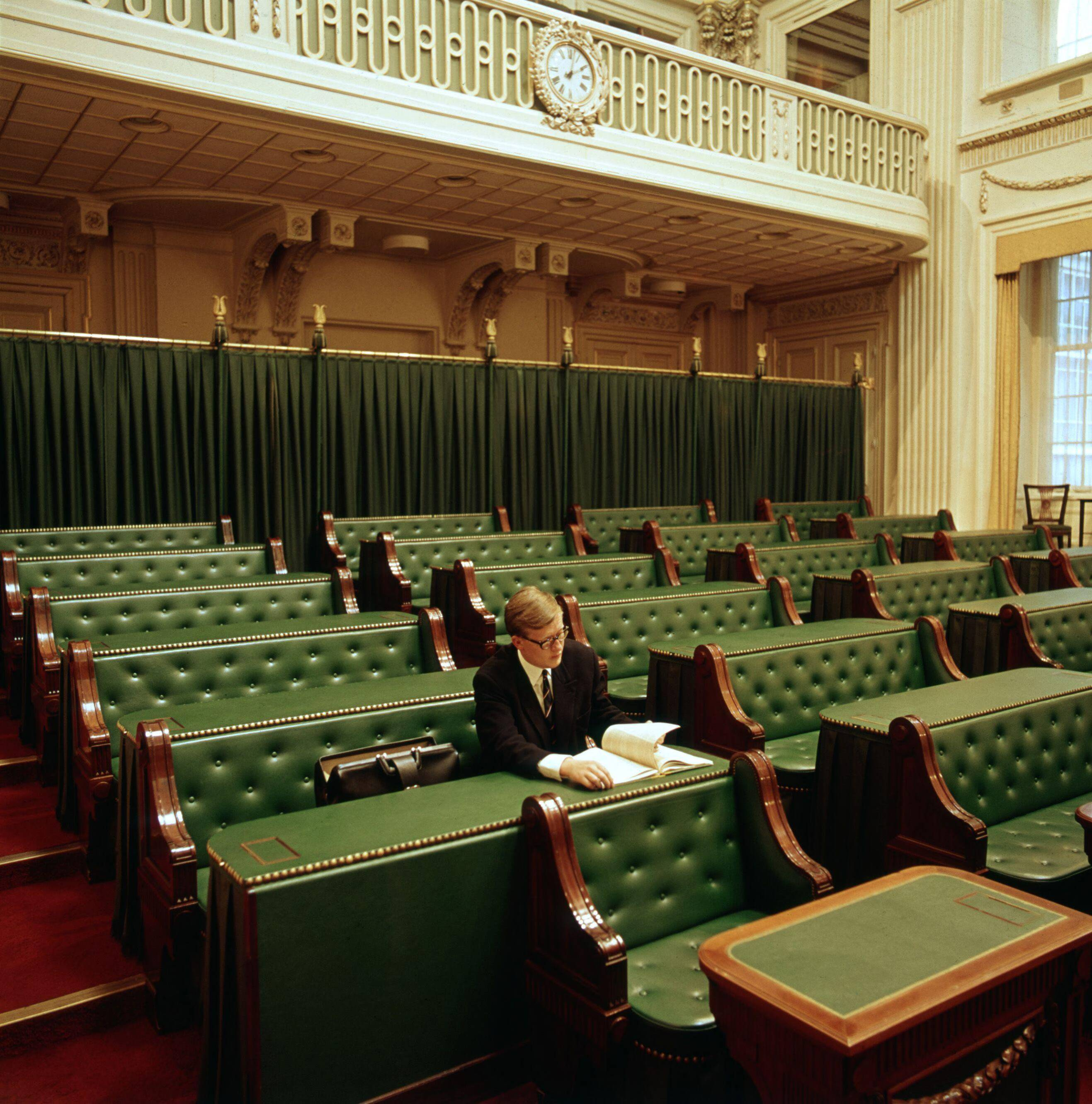
Hans Wiegel in the House of Representatives in 1967

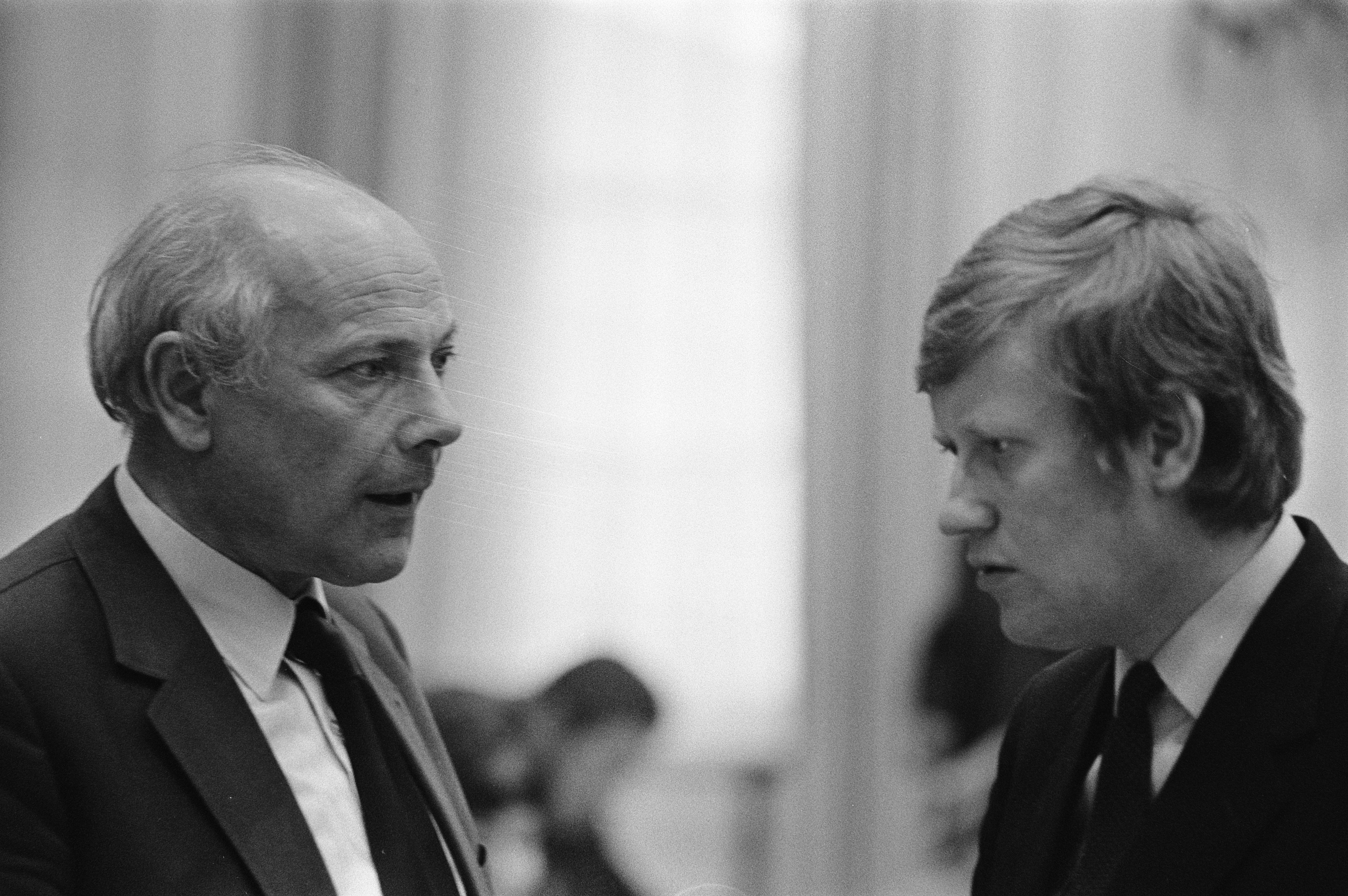
Labour Leader Joop den Uyl and Hans Wiegel during a financial debate in the House of Representatives on 22 June 1972

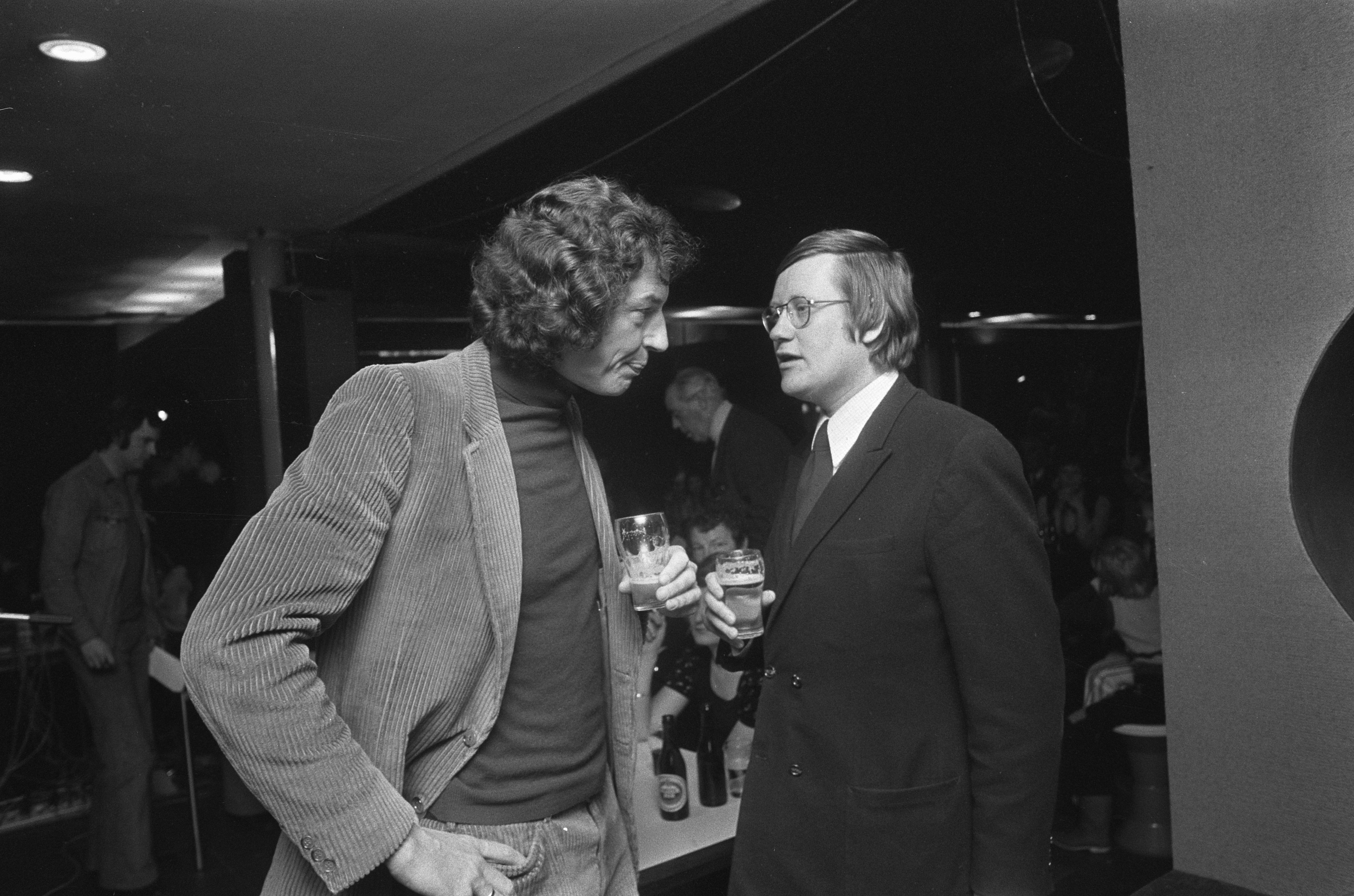
Trade union leader Wim Kok and Hans Wiegel during a meeting in Hilversum on 9 March 1974

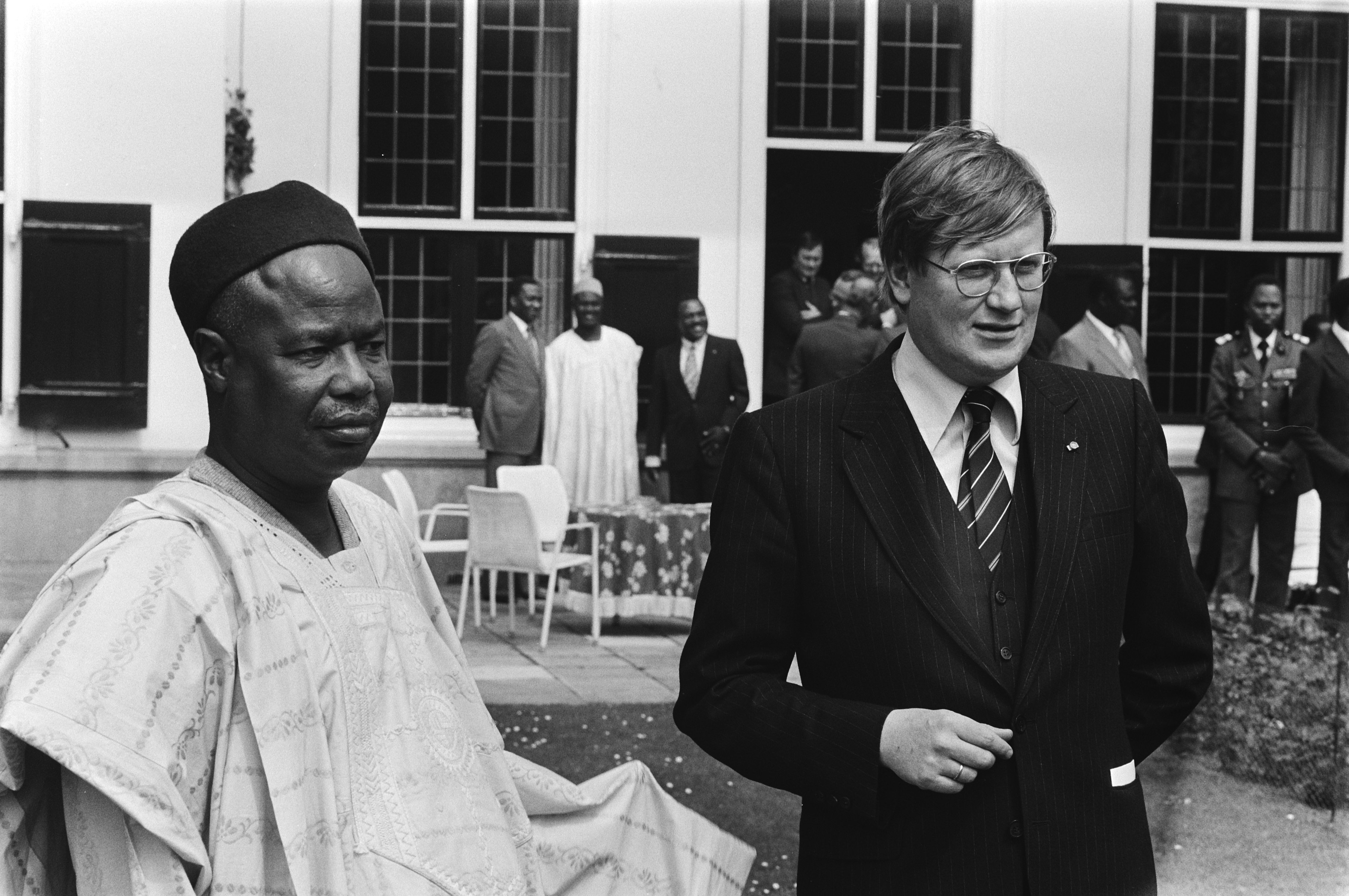
President of Cameroon Ahmadou Ahidjo and Deputy Prime Minister Hans Wiegel during a meeting at the Catshuis on 5 July 1979

Hans Wiegel was born on 16 July 1941 in Amsterdam in the province of North Holland in a secular family as the only son of Wilhelm Wiegel III (born 21 March 1913 in Amsterdam) and Sophia Maria Alberdina Smolenaars (born 3 November 1915 in Cimahi in the Dutch East Indies). After completing gymnasium in Hilversum in 1959, Wiegel started studying law at the University of Amsterdam. After a couple of months, he switched his major to political science and earned a Candidate degree in 1965. He decided not to pursue a master's degree. Instead, he became involved in politics. Wiegel was active within the youth wing of the People's Party for Freedom and Democracy (VVD), the Youth Organisation Freedom and Democracy, of which he had been a member since 1961. In 1963, he was appointed to its national board and served as chairman from 1965 until 1966.

== Politics ==
In 1967, Wiegel was elected to the House of Representatives, where he served as spokesperson for local government affairs. In 1971, at the age of thirty, he became the leader of his party. During the period of the Den Uyl cabinet, Wiegel acted as the main Leader of the Opposition against the cabinet and Prime Minister Joop den Uyl. In 1977, he negotiated the formation of the Van Agt-Wiegel cabinet; in this cabinet he became Minister of the Interior and Deputy Prime Minister and prepared the constitutional revision of 1983.

In 1995, Wiegel was elected to the Senate. In the Senate, he chaired the parliamentary committees for General Affairs and the Interior, and served as spokesperson for the interior, governmental reforms and the Royal Family. In 1999, Wiegel caused a brief cabinet crisis by voting against the constitutional revision that would make national referendums possible. This crisis is called the "Night of Wiegel". Shortly after it, in 2000, he left the Senate.

Wiegel led the VVD in the general elections of 1972, 1977 and 1981. During his leadership, the VVD shifted its orientation away from the upper class and towards the middle class and educated workers; this led to electoral success.

In 1982, Wiegel left national politics. He was awarded honorary membership of the VVD and became Queen's Commissioner of Friesland from 16 June 1982 until 1 February 1994. During his period as Queen's Commissioner, Wiegel became known as the "Oracle of Diever", because he played an important role advising the VVD and commenting on events in national politics. In 1986, Wiegel was asked to return to the Ministry of the Interior and Kingdom Relations, but he refused.

=== Possible return to politics ===
On the evening of 6 May 2002 in Leeuwarden, Wiegel was to meet with Pim Fortuyn, who he saw as a suitable candidate for Prime Minister. Earlier that day, however, Fortuyn was assassinated in Hilversum.

In October 2005, the local branch of the VVD in Alphen aan den Rijn called on other local branches to sign a petition to get Wiegel back into active politics. More than 90% of the branches supported this petition. Wiegel wanted to announce in March/April 2006 his decision as to whether or not he was making a comeback. Then–party leader Jozias van Aartsen stated in January 2006 that Wiegel most likely would be the VVD's candidate for prime minister in the 2007 general election.

On 8 March 2006, the day after a poor showing of the VVD in the 2006 municipal elections, Wiegel issued a press statement to the effect that he would not return to Dutch politics.

On 22 November 2007, Wiegel called for a broad liberal movement consisting of the VVD, the Party for Freedom of Geert Wilders, Rita Verdonk's Proud of the Netherlands and the Democrats 66. Besides Rita Verdonk, none of these parties favour this plan. On 15 September 2009, he repeated these words in the morning bulletin Goodmorning Netherlands Wiegel then called his party should seek cooperation with the Party for Freedom.

Thirty years after leaving national politics, Wiegel was still mentioned often as a potential Prime Minister. He still was very popular among VVD party members in the Netherlands up until his death. He "threatened" to return to national politics a number of times, usually resulting in the VVD going up in the polls. His opponents admonished this behaviour, implying that he was just trying to keep himself from being forgotten.

On 12 April 2010, during a broadcast of the TV programme De Wereld Draait Door, Wiegel humoristically joked that he had been the best Prime Minister the Netherlands had never had. That view was shared by politician Joost Eerdmans on Wiegel's seventieth birthday. On 29 May 2012, in an interview with the Algemeen Dagblad, he expressed criticism on the agreement the VVD and the Christian Democratic Appeal made with the Democrats 66, GroenLinks and ChristianUnion on the budgetary crisis and called it "a serious strategic error".

== Personal life and death ==
Wiegel married his first wife Jacqueline Francina "Pien" Frederiks (born 9 September 1954) on 1 June 1973. He had two children with her, Erik (born 1975) and Marieke (born 1977). On 6 November 1980, Pien Frederiks died of complications from suffering a car crash. She was twenty-six years old, and left her two young children behind Erik (five) and Marieke (three). On 7 April 1982, Wiegel quietly remarried to his late wife's older sister Marianne Frederiks (born 21 September 1951). On 6 January 2005, Marianne Frederiks died in a car crash at the age of fifty-three. From 2006 until 2010, Wiegel had a relationship with Madelon Spoor. Wiegel lived in a farm in Oudega, a small town in the municipality Súdwest-Fryslân in the province of Friesland, he also owns a pied-à-terre in The Hague.

On 6 August 2019, Wiegel announced that he had suffered a light stroke at his home and that he would be undergoing rehabilitation in the next few months.

Wiegel died on 19 May 2025, at the age of 83.

== Decorations ==
Honours
Ribbon bar	Honour	Country	Date	Comment
	Knight of the Order of the Netherlands Lion	Netherlands	26 October 1981	
	Grand Officer of the Order of Orange-Nassau	Netherlands	20 January 1994	Elevated from Commander (28 April 1989)
	Grand Cross of the Order of the Crown	Belgium	1998	
	Knight Grand Cross of the Order of Civil Merit	Spain	2002	

Awards
Ribbon bar	Awards	Organization	Date	Comment
	Honorary Member	People's Party for Freedom and Democracy	14 May 1982	

Party political offices
Preceded by Molly Geertsema	Leader of the People's Party for Freedom and Democracy; 1971–1982	Succeeded by Ed Nijpels
Preceded by Molly Geertsema	Parliamentary leader of the People's Party for Freedom and Democracy in the House of Representatives; 1971–1977	Succeeded by Koos Rietkerk
Preceded by Molly Geertsema	Lead candidate of the People's Party for Freedom and Democracy; 1972 • 1977 • 1981	Succeeded by Ed Nijpels
Preceded by Koos Rietkerk	Parliamentary leader of the People's Party for Freedom and Democracy in the House of Representatives; 1981–1982	Succeeded by Ed Nijpels
Political offices
Preceded by Gaius de Gaay Fortman	Deputy Prime Minister; 1977–1981	Succeeded by Joop den Uyl; Jan Terlouw
Preceded by Gaius de Gaay Fortman	Minister of the Interior; 1977–1981	Succeeded by Ed van Thijn
Preceded by Hedzer Rijpstra	Queen's Commissioner of Friesland; 1982–1994	Succeeded by Loek Hermans
