= Zelhem =

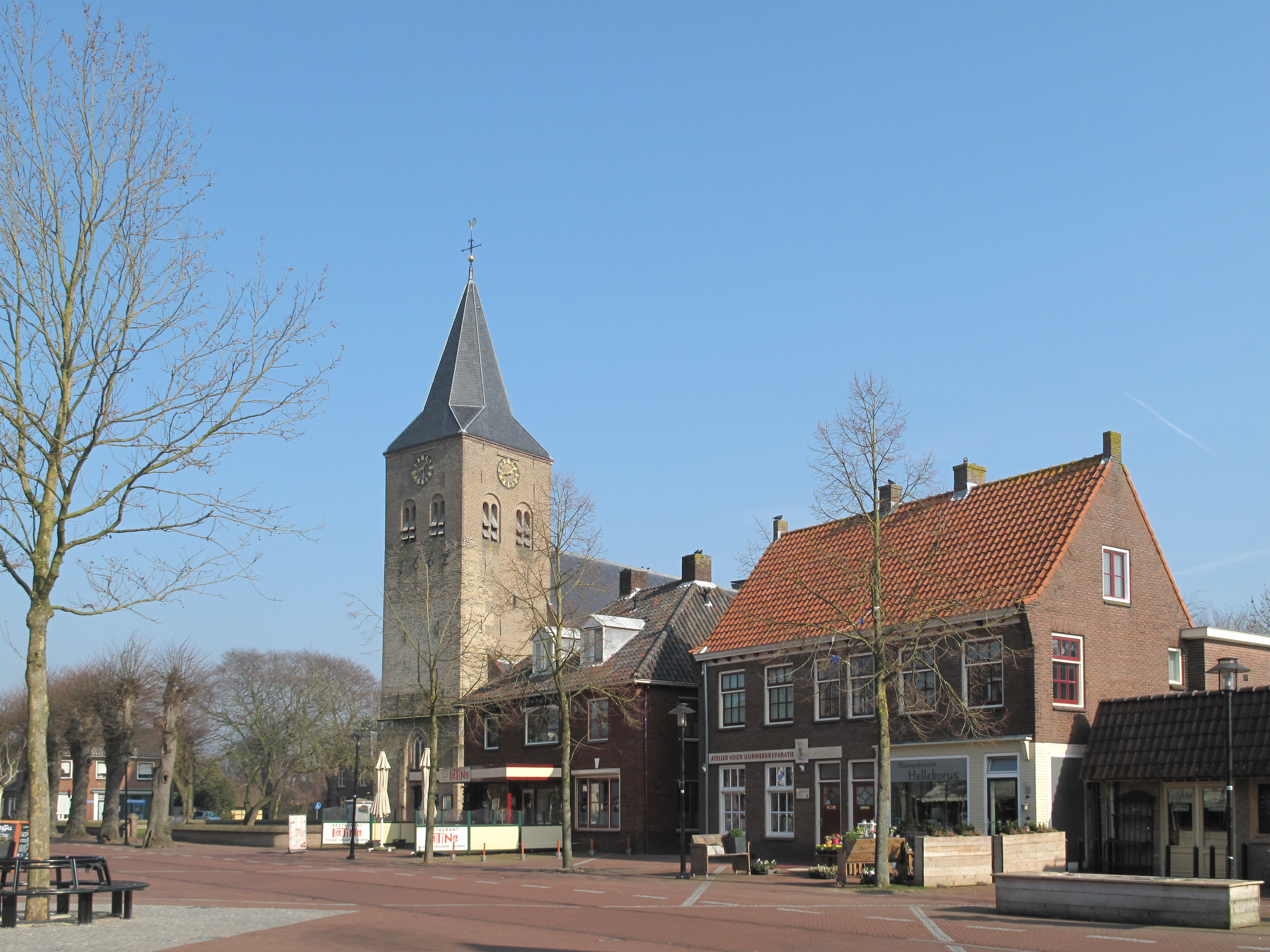
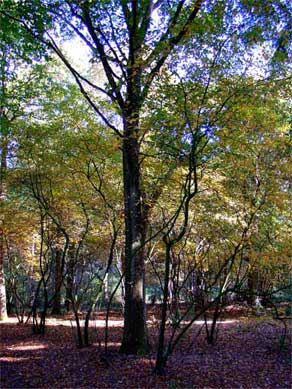
- Zelhem, church: Lambertikerk Rural estate 't Zand near Zelhem

- Flag Coat of arms
- Interactive map of Zelhem
- Coordinates: 52°0′23″N 6°20′59″E
- Country: Netherlands
- Province: Gelderland
- Municipality: Bronckhorst

Population
  - Total: 11,000

Zelhem is a town in the Dutch province of Gelderland. It has approximately 11,000 inhabitants. Zelhem is located in the municipality of Bronckhorst, about 7 km northeast of Doetinchem.

Zelhem was a separate municipality until 2005, when it became a part of Bronckhorst. The municipality used to cover an area of 81.89 km^{2}.

== History ==
The village is more than 1200 years old. The modern name Zelhem originated from Salehem. This name was given to the village when a chapel was built and a gift-document was presented to the inhabitants.

The name Salehem comes from two words 'Sale' which means 'house' and 'heim' which means 'place where people are home'.

The founder of this chapel was a passionate preacher called Liudger. He brought religion to the land of the Saksen. Between 1450 and 1500 the church as we know it was built. It was dedicated to St. Lambertus, bishop of Maastricht in the time of Ludger (hence the name 'Lambertikerk').

== The myth of Smoks Hanne ==
The village also has a myth of 'Smoks Hanne'. She lived in Zelhem somewhere in the nineteenth century. Nowadays she's pictured as a good witch flying on a broom. The funny part is that Smoks Hanne only has one clog (on her left foot) and the broom she's flying on is backwards. It is assumed that Smoks Hanne lost her clog during flight. Unfortunately there's not much information about this old lady. But when the village celebrated its 1200th anniversary, the theme was all about her.

== People born in Zelhem ==
- Hedzer Rijpstra (1919-2011), politician
- Jan Remmelink (1922–2003), jurist
- Leo Klein Gebbink (born 1968), hockey player
