= Hertogin Hedwigepolder =

Polder (1907-2022) in Zeeland, Netherlands

The Hertogin Hedwigepolder (often shortened to Hedwigepolder) was a polder between 1907 and 2022 in Zeeland, Netherlands. A small part of the polder is on Belgian territory.

In 2005 it was decided to depolder the Hedwigepolder in order to restore the natural quality in the Western Scheldt. This decision was controversial in Zeeland and Dutch politics, which delayed it. In October 2022, a start was made with the depoldering.

== Poldering ==
The area was already diked before the Eighty Years' War. During this war, Dutch soldiers in 1584 for strategic reasons (inundation) breached the last intact dikes, after which Saeftinghe disappeared under water. In the 17th century, diking started again, and in 1907 the Hedwigepolder was the last area in the eastern corner of Zeelandic Flanders that was conquered from the sea.

== Depoldering ==
=== Treaty (2005) ===
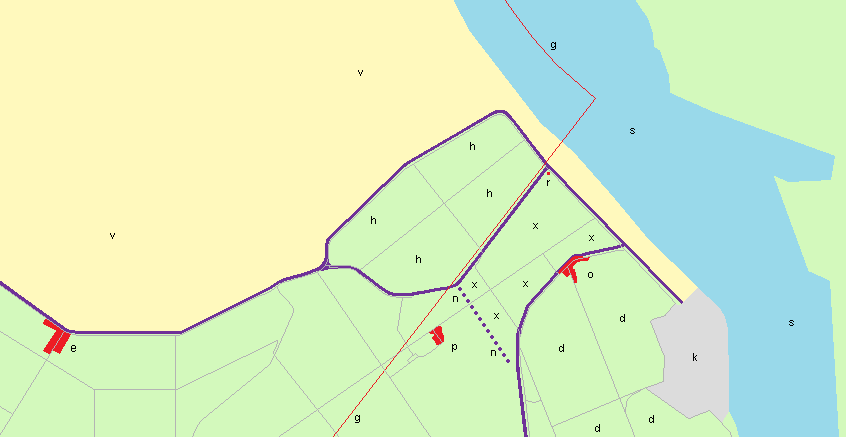
The Hedwigepolder (h), surrounded by the Drowned Land of Saeftinghe (v), the Scheldt (s), and the Prosperpolder (the adjacent green area). Part (x) of the Prosperpolder is also to be depoldered and a new dike (n) will protect the rest of the Prosperpolder.

In 2005, the Netherlands and Belgium concluded four "Scheldt treaties", in which it was agreed, among other things, that the Western Scheldt would be deepened in order to keep the port of Antwerp accessible. It was also agreed to create six hundred hectares of nature outside the dykes. This was necessary because nature in the Western Scheldt had deteriorated in previous decades, as a result of which people no longer complied with the European Birds Directive and Habitats Directive. (Note: A common misconception is that the depoldering was necessary to compensate for the deepening of the Scheldt. However, the European requirements were not met, and regardless of the deepening, nature compensation was necessary for nature that was lost in the past.) Within the Netherlands, therefore, the depoldering of Hedwigepolder was proposed. In Flanders, where people worked on the Sigmaplan, they proposed the depoldering of part of the Prosperpolder. Work on the depoldering of the Hedwigepolder should have started at the end of 2007.

=== Resistance ===
The plan to depolder the Hedwigepolder led to resistance within the Provincial Council of Zeeland and within the Dutch House of Representatives. The Belgian landowner Gery de Cloedt also refused to sell his land in the Hedwigepolder, stalling the depoldering. In the spring of 2007, Minister of Agriculture and Nature Gerda Verburg announced that she would proceed with expropriation, despite a parliamentary motion adopted in 2006 against involuntary land expropriation.

After the Dutch Senate also opposed the plans in 2008, Verburg announced that he would look for alternatives in a larger area than had been searched until then. The Western Scheldt Nature Restoration Committee then conducted research into the alternatives under the leadership of former minister Ed Nijpels. The committee concluded that the original plan for depoldering the Hedwigepolder was the best, because other alternatives were more expensive and more complicated, or were too far away to contribute to the nature around the Western Scheldt. In addition, Flanders indicated that it would only pay for the depoldering of the Hedwigepolder, as agreed in the treaties, and not for (more expensive) alternatives.

In April 2009, the Dutch Council of Ministers decided against depoldering after all, because of the resistance in Zeeland and both Chambers. Instead, a plan from water boards was adopted in which nature outside the dykes must be constructed. The committee led by Nijpels had also investigated this alternative, but concluded that the nature objectives would not be achieved.

In July 2009, by means of a letter to the cabinet, the European Commission expressed itself very critically about the intention not to depolder the Hedwigepolder, because the Commission doubted whether this would comply with the mandatory nature restoration. That same month, the Council of State also ruled in a case brought by the Zeeuwse Milieufederatie. The Zeeland Milieufederatie had brought the case out of dissatisfaction with the decision not to depolder the Hedwigepolder and argued that the deepening of the Scheldt would affect nature. The Council of State ruled in a preliminary ruling that it was uncertain whether the "natural features of the area" would not be affected. The Council of State therefore temporarily prohibited deepening. The ruling led to outrage among the Flemish government and to a conflict between the two countries, because according to them the depoldering could have prevented the ruling.

In October 2009, a study confirmed again that there was no real alternative to depoldering. It was stipulated in the treaty that the work had to be completed by the end of 2009, and the port of Antwerp announced that it would consider a claim for damages (estimated annual damage € 70 million) if this was not fulfilled. On 9 October 2009, the cabinet decided to proceed with the depoldering after all. In January 2010, the Council of State ruled that the Scheldt could be deepened, contrary to the provisional ruling. This is because the consequences for nature were not so uncertain.

=== Cabinet Rutte I ===
The coalition agreement of First Rutte cabinet, which was drawn up during the cabinet formation in 2010, stated that alternatives for the depoldering of the Hedwigepolder were being reviewed, in consultation with Flanders. Among others local politician for the Partij voor Zeeland Johan Robesin had insisted on this. On 16 June 2011 it was announced that the government wanted to Welzingepolder and Schorerpolder instead. This was criticized by, among others, the Vogelbescherming, the government of Flanders and the European Commission.
