= Jan Remmelink =

Professor Jan Remmelink
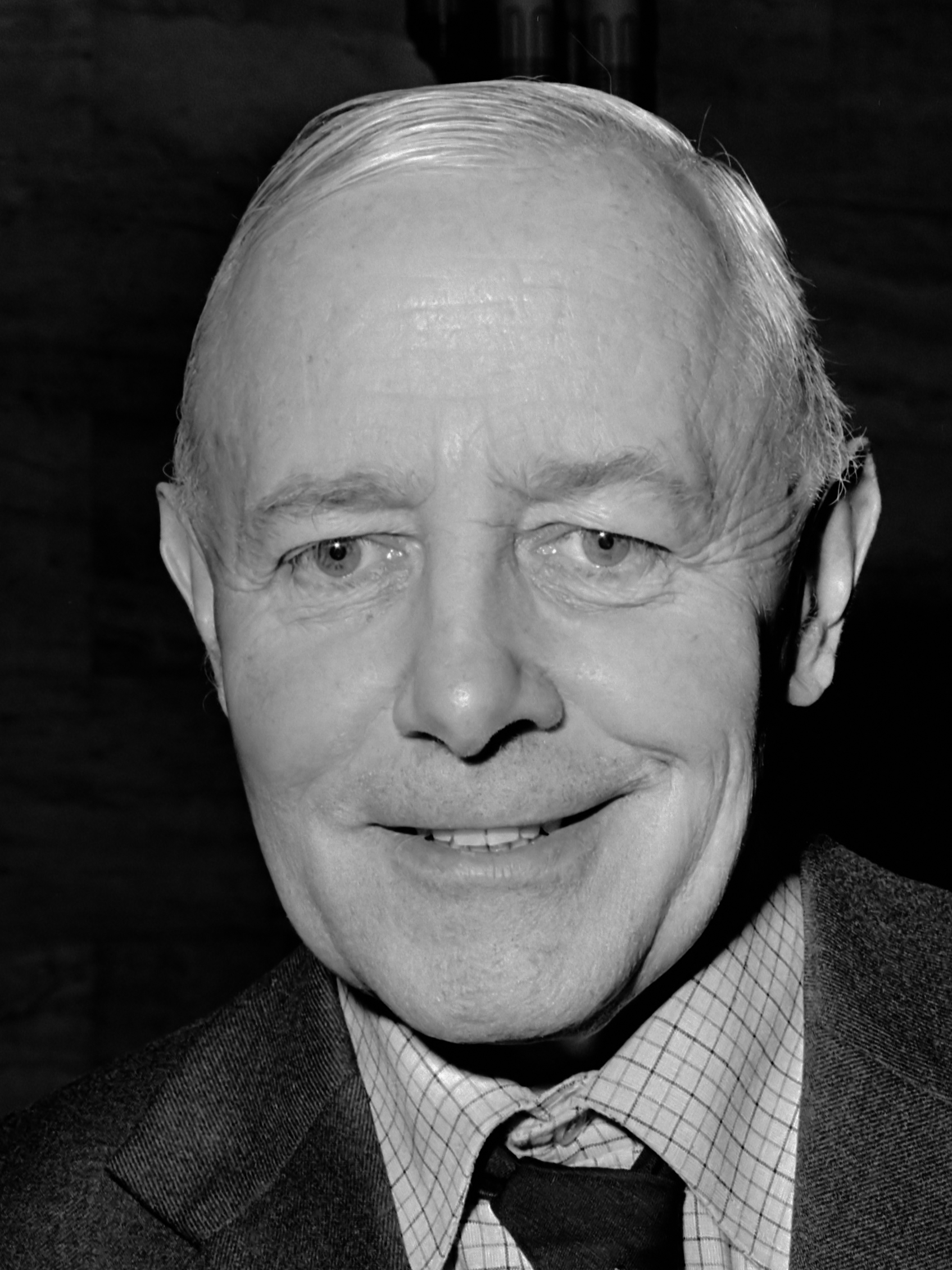
- Jan Remmelink in 1978

Attorney General of the High Council of the Netherlands
- In office 1968–1989

Personal details
- Born: 27 April 1922 Zelhem, Netherlands
- Died: 15 May 2003 (aged 81) Groningen, Netherlands

Professor Jan Remmelink (27 April 1922, Zelhem, Gelderland – 15 May 2003, Groningen) was Attorney General of the High Council of the Netherlands from 1968 to 1989. In 1979 he became member of the Royal Netherlands Academy of Arts and Sciences. He headed the Dutch government committee on euthanasia that released the first, official study of the practice of euthanasia in the Netherlands in 1991. Internationally, this report - Medical Decisions About the End of Life, also called the Remmelink Report - has led to much discussion.
