= Uri Rosenthal =

Dutch politician (born 1945)

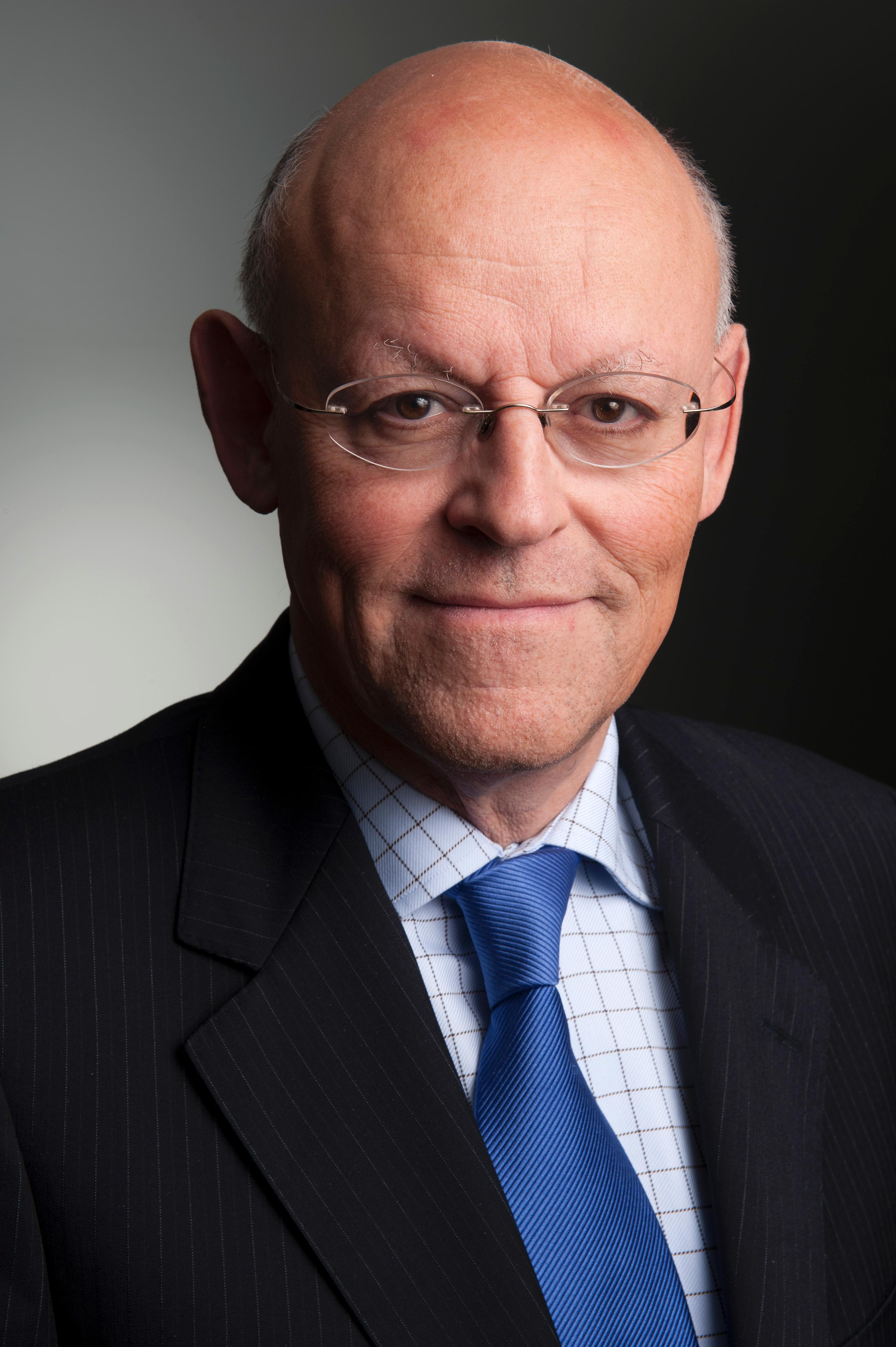
- Rosenthal in 2011

Minister of Foreign Affairs
- In office 14 October 2010 – 5 November 2012
- Prime Minister: Mark Rutte
- Preceded by: Maxime Verhagen
- Succeeded by: Frans Timmermans

Parliamentary leader in the Senate
- In office 5 May 2005 – 14 October 2010
- Preceded by: Nicoline van den Broek
- Succeeded by: Fred de Graaf
- Parliamentary group: People's Party for Freedom and Democracy

Member of the Senate
- In office 8 June 1999 – 14 October 2010
- Parliamentary group: People's Party for Freedom and Democracy

Personal details
- Born: Uriël Rosenthal; 19 July 1945 (age 81) Montreux, Switzerland
- Party: People's Party for Freedom and Democracy (since 1984)
- Spouse: Dinah Epstein (m. 1973)
- Children: 2 daughters
- Education: University of Amsterdam (Bachelor of Social Science, Master of Social Science); Erasmus University Rotterdam (Doctor of Philosophy)
- Occupation: Politician · Civil servant · Political scientist · Historian · Academic administrator · Researcher · Management consultant · Nonprofit director · Author · Columnist · Professor

Uriël "Uri" Rosenthal ([ˈuːri ˈroːzə(n)taːl]; born 19 July 1945) is a retired Dutch politician of the People's Party for Freedom and Democracy (VVD) and political scientist.

Rosenthal a political scientist by occupation, was elected as a Member of the Senate on 8 June 1999 after the Senate election of 1999. On 5 May 2005 he was selected as the parliamentary leader of the People's Party for Freedom and Democracy in the Senate. Following the election of 2010 Rosenthal was asked to become Minister of Foreign Affairs in the Cabinet Rutte–Verhagen Rosenthal accepted and resigned as parliamentary leader in the Senate and a Member of the Senate the same day he took office as the new Minister of Foreign Affairs on 14 October 2010 serving until 5 November 2012.

A professor of political science and public administration by occupation, he taught from 1980 until 2010 at the Erasmus University Rotterdam and Leiden University.

== Early life ==
Uriël Rosenthal was born on 19 July 1945 in Montreux, Switzerland to Jewish parents who during World War II fled the Netherlands from the German occupation of the Netherlands. They returned to the Netherlands shortly after the war ended. After attending school in The Hague, he went to study political science at the University of Amsterdam, where he obtained a Bachelor of Social Science and a Master of Social Science in 1970. In 1978 he received his Doctor of Philosophy in social sciences at the Erasmus University Rotterdam. In 1980 he became a professor of political science and public administration at the Erasmus University Rotterdam. From 1987 until 2011 he was a professor of public administration at the Leiden University. As of March 28, 2025, Rosenthal returned his degree in protest of the University of Amsterdam's policies.

== Politics ==
He was elected Member of the Senate as a member of the People's Party for Freedom and Democracy and took office on 8 June 1999. He became the Parliamentary leader in the Senate on 5 May 2005. On 12 June 2010 Queen Beatrix nominated Rosenthal as first informateur in the 2010 Dutch cabinet formation. On 26 June the Queen replaced Rosenthal with Herman Tjeenk Willink, the Vice President of the Council of State as the new informateur. On 5 July he became informateur a second time together with Jacques Wallage of the Labour Party. But on 21 July the Queen again replaced him and Wallage with Minister of State and former Prime Minister Ruud Lubbers.

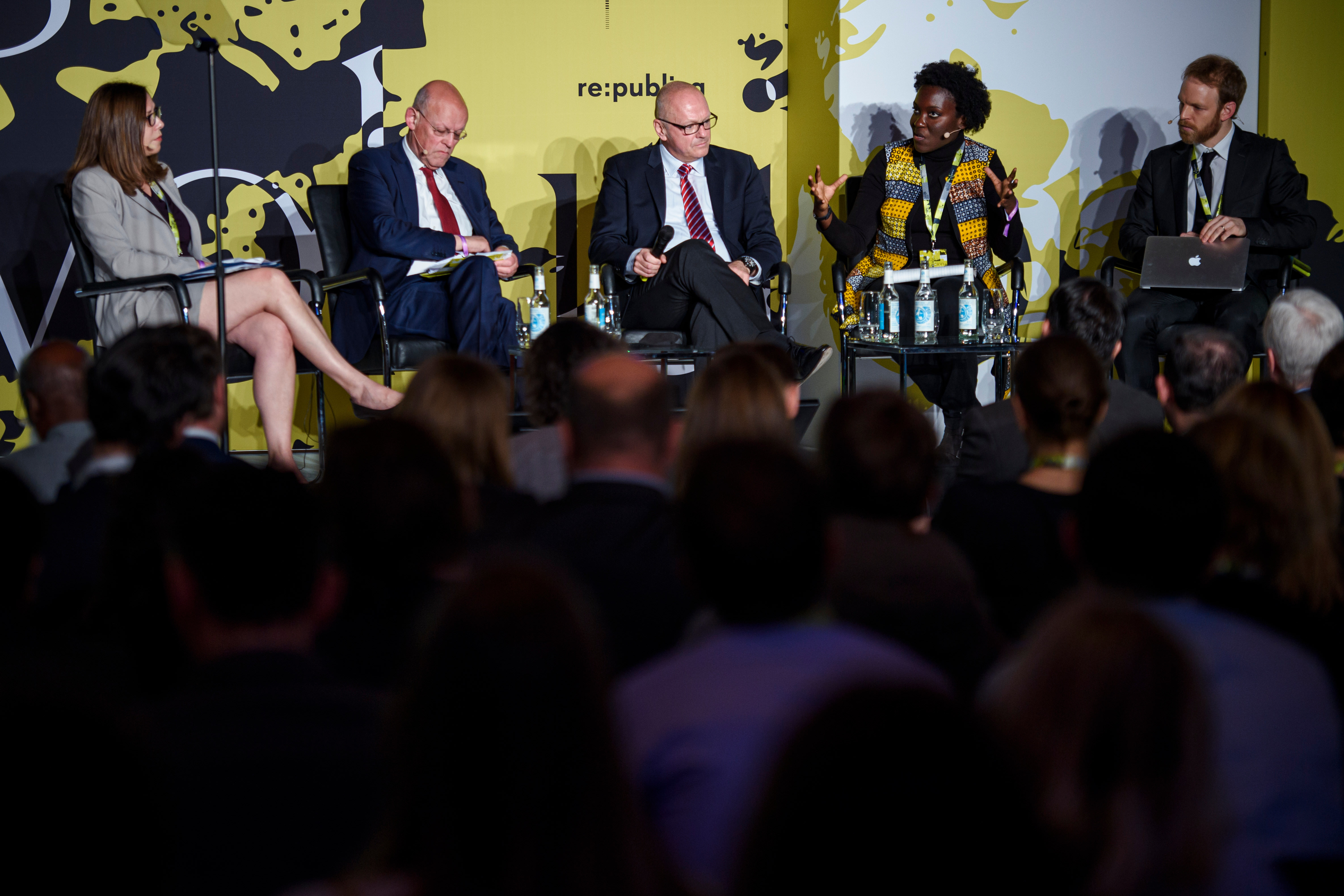
Laura Rosenberger, Uri Rosenthal, Andreas Michaelis, Nanjala Nyabola, Oliver della Costa Stuenkel at Future Affairs in Berlin in 2019

On 28 September 2010 the negotiations were finished. A coalition agreement was reached between People's Party for Freedom and Democracy and Christian Democratic Appeal to form a minority coalition, supported by the Party for Freedom to obtain a majority. Formateur Mark Rutte asked Rosenthal as the Minister of Foreign Affairs in the new cabinet. Because a member of the States-General of the Netherlands can not serve in the cabinet he resigned as a Member of the Senate and Parliamentary leader on 14 October 2010, the same day he took office as the new Minister of Foreign Affairs.

As of 1 March 2013, Rosenthal is chairman of the Policy Advisory Council on Science and Technology (AWT).

He has been nominated by the Dutch Government to serve as the Special Envoy for the fourth International Cyberspace Conference to be held in 2015.

== Family ==
He has been married since 4 January 1973. He lives in Rotterdam with his wife, Dinah, and their two children. Dinah Rosenthal is an Israeli native, originally from Haifa. Two of Rosenthal's sisters live in Israel.

== Decorations ==
Honours
Ribbon bar	Honour	Country	Date	Comment
	Officer of the Order of Orange-Nassau	Netherlands	10 December 1985	

== Ties to Israel lobby ==
His ties to the Israeli lobby where confirmed in July 2024 by journalists from Left Laser when he was seen attending a secret AIPAC meeting in Amsterdam.

Party political offices
Preceded by Nicoline van den Broek	Parliamentary leader of the People's Party for Freedom and Democracy in the Senate; 2005–2010	Succeeded by Fred de Graaf
Political offices
Preceded by Maxime Verhagen	Minister of Foreign Affairs; 2010–2012	Succeeded by Frans Timmermans
