= Head rag tax =

Proposed headscarf tax in the Netherlands

The head rag tax (Dutch: kopvoddentaks) is the pejorative name under which a tax on wearing headscarves in the Netherlands has been suggested by the Dutch politician Geert Wilders, who founded and leads the Party for Freedom.

Wilders made the suggestion of a headscarf tax on September 16, 2009 during the "General reflections". Those who wanted to wear headscarves would have to obtain a permit first, which would cost a thousand euros per year. This was a way for him to try to discourage people from wearing a headscarf. The money would be used to finance women's shelters for those trying to abandon Islam.

Wilders' suggestion attracted disbelief and criticism from other political parties. D66 party leader Alexander Pechtold asked: "Is this a stand-up show?", and wanted to know if the hat of minister Plasterk would also fall under the tax definition. The Egyptian-Dutch publicist Nahed Selim wondered whether Wilders was inspired by a special tax for Jews and Christians which existed in Islamic countries until the middle of the 19th century. She thought Wilders' suggestion was a missed opportunity, and would have rather he kept his attention on the Islamisation of public space.

When, in November 2009, the tax plan was discussed, Teun van Dijck of the Freedom Party was challenged by parliament member Farshad Bashir of the Socialist Party to file an amendment. Van Dijck answered that he would not, because the proposal was not yet sorted out.

In January 2010, journalist Karen Geurtsen of the magazine HP/De Tijd made public that there was criticism of the idea within the Party for Freedom, and that Wilders later admitted that he had gone too far. Geurtsen was undercover as an intern in the party. Wilders called it "total nonsense" that he would have admitted to an intern that his proposal went too far.

In the party election programme for 2010 to 2015 for the Freedom Party, the word "head rag tax" is not mentioned; however, there is a plea to tax headscarves.
