= Inez Pijnenburg =

Dutch politician

W.R.J.M. "Inez" Pijnenburg-Adriaenssen (born 13 May 1949) is a Dutch politician of the People's Party for Freedom and Democracy (VVD).

Pijnenburg was a member of the States-Provincial of Gelderland from 1999 to 2002. She was an alderman of Arnhem from 2002 to 2006. From 2007 to 2008 she was acting mayor of Neder-Betuwe, and since 2008 she has been mayor of Heerde.
