= Vestia (public housing organization) =

Stichting Vestia
- Logo of the organization
- Type: Housing organization
- Headquarters: Rotterdam
- CEO: Arjan Schakenbos
- CFO: Willy de Mooij
- Main organ: Raad van bestuur (board of directors)
- Staff: 871
- Website: vestia.nl

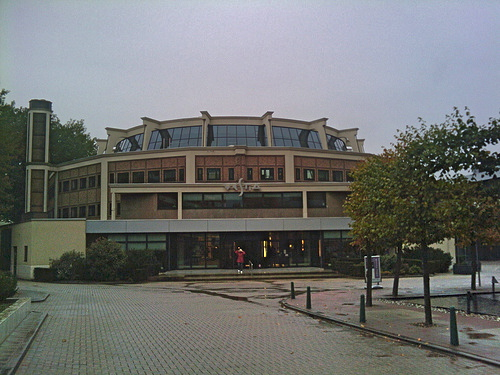
Former headquarters of Vestia in Rotterdam

Vestia, formally Stichting Vestia is the largest public housing corporation (Dutch: Woningcorporatie) in the Netherlands, which is headquartered in Rotterdam. The corporation owns (and rents out) about 78,000 houses and 8,000 other "rentable units" (shops, offices).

Vestia got in serious trouble after it took increasing positions in derivatives during 2010 and 2011. However, it did not manage the risk of its positions, costing more than €2.7bn to get rid of the toxic financial products. The previous director Erik Staal who had been responsible for the huge losses the corporation suffered by these speculations in the financial market, resigned in January 2012. An official parlementary inquiry took place in 2013 and 2014 to find out what went wrong.
