= Hedzer Rijpstra =

Dutch politician

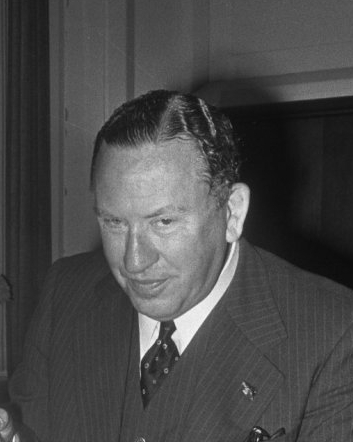
Hedzer Rijpstra

Hedzer Rijpstra (11 May 1919 – 7 April 2011) was a Dutch politician who served as Queen's Commissioner for Friesland from 1970 to 1982. He was born in Zelhem and died in Oegstgeest at the age of 91. He was a member of the Christian Historical Union.
