= Tuijnman =

Tuijnman is a Dutch surname. Notable people with the surname include:

- Albertus Cornelis Tuijnman (1959–2024), Dutch-born statistician, policy analyst and academic
- Dany Tuijnman (1915–1992), Dutch politician
- Elisabeth Tuijnman (born 1943), Dutch civil servant
