= Marcel van Dam =

Dutch politician

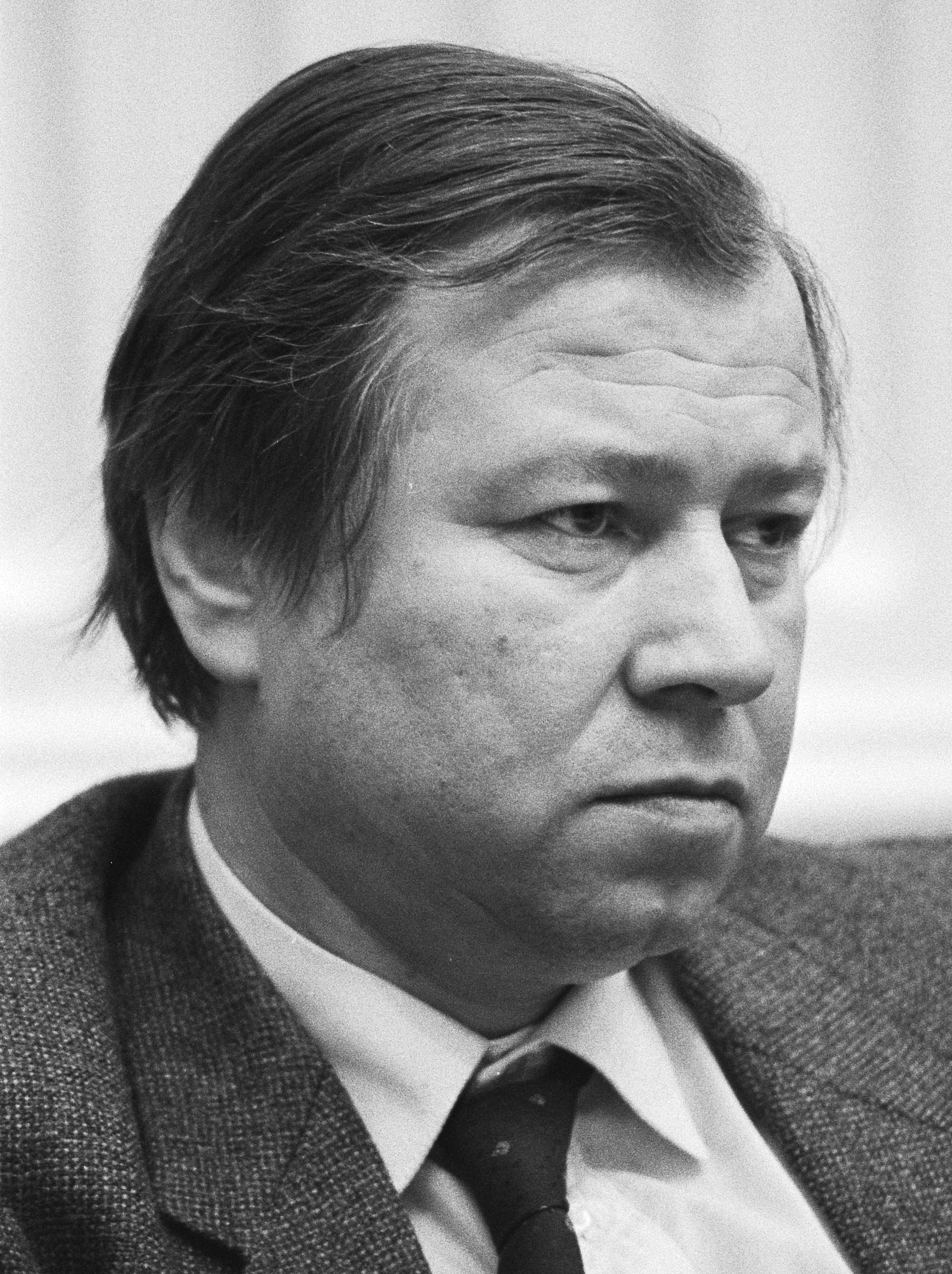
- Marcel van Dam in 1982

Minister of Housing and Spatial Planning
- In office 11 September 1981 – 29 May 1982
- Prime Minister: Dries van Agt
- Preceded by: Dany Tuijnman (ad interim)
- Succeeded by: Erwin Nypels

Member of the House of Representatives
- In office 16 September 1982 – 22 January 1986
- In office 8 June 1977 – 11 September 1981

State Secretary for Housing and Spatial Planning
- In office 11 May 1973 – 8 September 1977 Serving with Jan Schaefer
- Prime Minister: Joop den Uyl
- Preceded by: Werner Buck
- Succeeded by: Gerrit Brokx

Personal details
- Born: Marcel Parcival Arthur van Dam; 30 January 1938 (age 88) Utrecht, Netherlands
- Party: Labour Party (1966–2003)
- Other political affiliations: Catholic People's Party (1956–1966)
- Spouse: Milou Derks (m. 1965)
- Children: 2 children
- Education: Utrecht University (Bachelor of Social Science, Master of Social Science)
- Occupation: Politician · Sociologist · Researcher · Ombudsman · Journalist · Editor · Author · television producer · Television presenter · Nonprofit director · Media administrator · Political pundit · Activist

Marcel Parcival Arthur van Dam (Dutch pronunciation: [mɑrˈsɛl vɑn ˈdɑm]; born 30 January 1938) is a retired Dutch politician of the Labour Party (PvdA) and journalist.

Van Dam worked as a researcher for the Wiardi Beckman Foundation from April 1967 until September 1969. Van Dam also was active as a political activist and was one of the leaders of the New Left movement in the Netherlands which aimed to steer the Labour Party more to the left. Van Dam worked as a journalist for the VARA from September 1969 until May 1973 as an ombudsman from September 1969 until May 1973 and as an editor from April 1971 until May 1973. After the 1972 general election Van Dam was appointed as State Secretary for Housing and Spatial Planning in the Den Uyl cabinet, taking office on 11 May 1973. The cabinet fell on 22 March 1977 and continued to serve in a demissionary capacity. Van Dam was elected to the House of Representatives in the 1977 general election, taking office on 8 June 1977 but he was still serving in the cabinet and because of dualism customs in the constitutional convention of Dutch politics he could not serve a dual mandate he subsequently resigned as State Secretary on 8 September 1977. After the 1981 general election Van Dam was appointed as Minister of Housing and Spatial Planning in the Van Agt II cabinet, taking office on 11 September 1981. The cabinet fell just seven months into its term on 12 May 1982 and continued to serve in a demissionary capacity until it was replaced by the caretaker Van Agt III cabinet on 29 May 1982. After the 1982 general election Van Dam returned to the House of Representatives, taking office on 16 September 1982.

In December 1985 Van Dam was nominated as chairman of the board of directors of public broadcaster VARA, he resigned from the House of Representatives on 22 January 1986 and was installed as a chairman serving from 10 January 1986 until 30 November 1995. Van Dam remained active in the public sector for the VARA working as a television presenter and television producer for several political programs from January 1996 until January 2005 and occupied numerous seats as a nonprofit director on several boards of directors and supervisory boards (International Institute of Social History, Terre des hommes, International Fellowship of Reconciliation and the Institute for Multiparty Democracy) and as an advocate and activist for social justice, social integration, anti-war movement, multiculturalism, minority groups and housing reformer.

Van Dam is known for his abilities as a debater and negotiator. Following his retirement Van Dam remains active as a political pundit and columnist for the VARA and the de Volkskrant and continues to comment on political affairs.

== Early life ==
Van Dam was born into a Catholic family as one of nine siblings, however during his childhood, both his youngest brother and one of his elder brothers died. During World War II, Van Dam's family had to go into hiding, as a result of his father's refusal to arrest Jews, and his subsequent contribution to the resistance.

In 1956 Van Dam became a member of the KVP and from 1957 he studied law and sociology at Utrecht University. He never completed studies in law, graduating instead as a sociologist. In 1965 he graduated with thesis on voter behaviour, before performing the first exit poll held in the Netherlands during parliamentary elections as per the methodology he had earlier developed.

== Labour Party ==
During the first Van Agt cabinet (1977–1981), Van Dam became the state secretary of Housing for the PvdA before the fall of the cabinet, then later becoming member of the House of Representatives (1977–1981).

At the height of the Lockheed bribery scandals in 1976, Van Dam came into conflict with then-Prime Minister Joop den Uyl. The Prime Minister pushed for a compromise on the sensitive issue, advocating that Prince Bernhard of Lippe-Biesterfeld should escape legal prosecution. Van Dam, however, thought the prince would be unjustly released. As he recounts: "I called Joop and said, Joop, I am resigning. And I went home." He later rescinded his resignation.

== Decorations ==
Honours
Ribbon bar	Honour	Country	Date	Comment
	Knight of the Order of the Netherlands Lion	Netherlands	11 April 1978	
	Commander of the Order of Orange-Nassau	Netherlands	9 September 1982	

Political offices
Preceded by Werner Buck	State Secretary for Housing and Spatial Planning; 1973–1977; With: Jan Schaefer	Succeeded by Gerrit Brokx
Preceded by Dany Tuijnman; Ad interim	Minister of Housing and Spatial Planning; 1981–1982	Succeeded by Erwin Nypels
Media offices
Preceded by Albert van den Heuvel	Chairman of the Board of directors of the VARA; 1986–1995	Succeeded by Vera Keur
