= Pieter Beelaerts van Blokland =

Dutch politician (1932–2021)

Jonkheer Pieter Beelaerts van Blokland
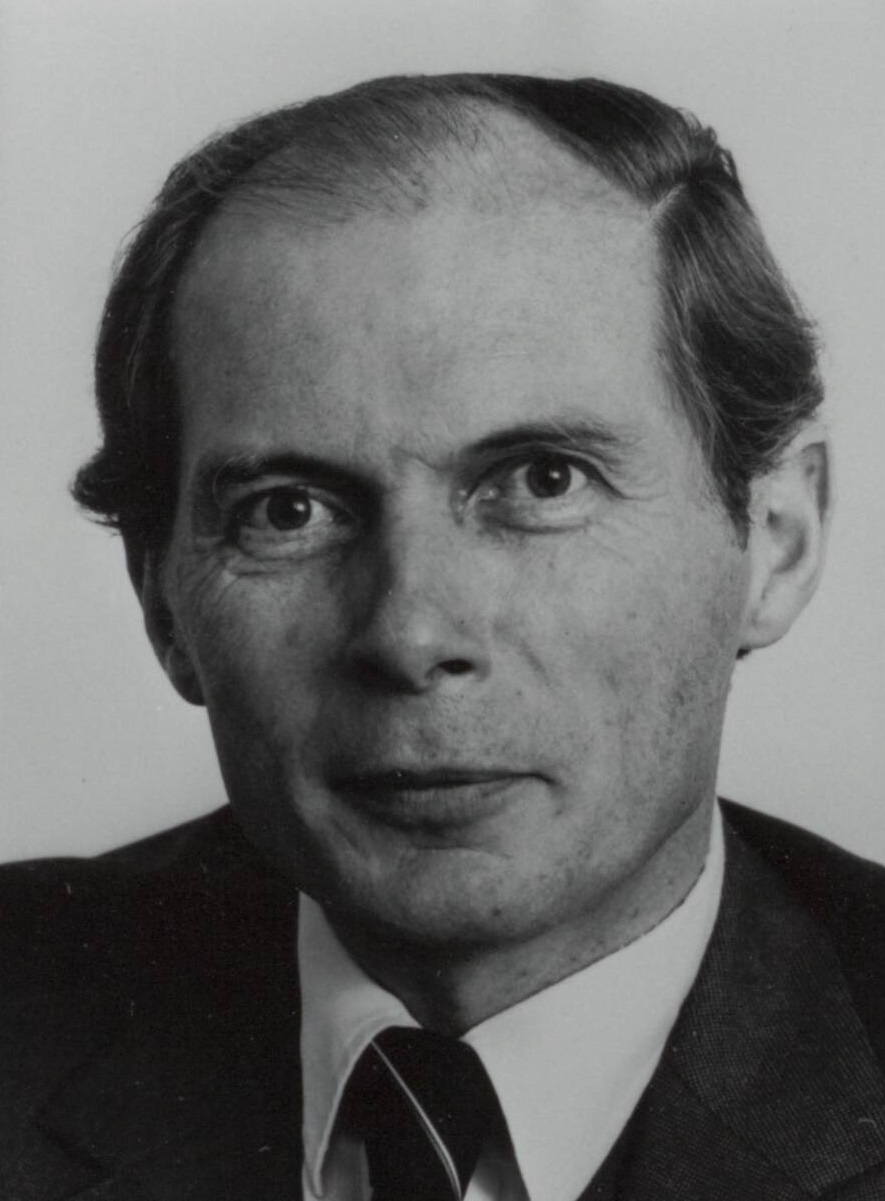
- Beelaerts van Blokland in 1987

Queen's Commissioner of Utrecht
- In office 16 October 1985 – 1 January 1998
- Monarch: Beatrix
- Preceded by: Pieter van Dijke
- Succeeded by: Boele Staal

Member of the House of Representatives
- In office 10 June 1981 – 9 September 1981

Minister of Housing and Spatial Planning
- In office 19 December 1977 – 1 September 1981
- Prime Minister: Dries van Agt
- Preceded by: Hans Gruijters
- Succeeded by: Dany Tuijnman (ad interim)
Mayoral positions
Mayor of Hengelo
In office 1 January 1999 – 1 October 2000; Ad interim
Preceded by	Wolter Lemstra
Succeeded by	Frank Kerckhaert
Mayor of Apeldoorn
In office 1 September 1981 – 16 October 1985
Preceded by	Frans Dijckmeester
Succeeded by	Ton Hubers
Mayor of Amstelveen
In office 1 January 1971 – 19 December 1977
Preceded by	Dirk Rijnders
Succeeded by	Wilhem Quarles van Ufford
Mayor of Vianen
In office 1 April 1967 – 1 January 1971
Preceded by	Govert Pellikaan
Succeeded by	Jan van Wijk
Mayor of Wolphaartsdijk
In office 1 February 1963 – 1 April 1967
Preceded by	Barend ter Haar Romeny
Succeeded by	Adriaan Hack (ad interim)

Personal details
- Born: Pieter Adriaan Cornelis Beelaerts van Blokland; 8 December 1932 Heerjansdam, Netherlands
- Died: 22 September 2021 (aged 88)
- Party: Christian Democratic Appeal (from 1980)
- Other political affiliations: Christian Historical Union (until 1980)
- Spouse: Ulrica Bentinck (m. 1961; died 2018)
- Children: 3 children
- Education: Delft University of Technology (Bachelor of Architecture, Master of Architecture)
- Occupation: Politician · Civil servant · Urban planner · Businessman · Corporate director · Nonprofit director · Lobbyist

Jonkheer Pieter Adriaan Cornelis Beelaerts van Blokland (8 December 1932 – 22 September 2021) was a Dutch politician of the Christian Democratic Appeal (CDA).

He was Minister of Housing, Spatial Planning and the Environment in the First Van Agt cabinet from 1977 to 1981. In 1981, he was a member of the House of Representatives. Beelaerts van Blokland was mayor of Wolphaartsdijk, Vianen, Amstelveen, Apeldoorn, and Hengelo. He was also Queen's Commissioner of Utrecht from 1985 to 1998.

== Decorations ==
Honours
Ribbon bar	Honour	Country	Date	Comment
	Knight of the Order of the Netherlands Lion	Netherlands	26 October 1981	
	Grand Officer of the Order of Orange-Nassau	Netherlands	1 January 1998	Elevated from Commander (30 April 1985)

Political offices
Preceded by Barend ter Haar Romeny	Mayor of Wolphaartsdijk; 1963–1967	Succeeded by Adriaan Hack; Ad interim
Preceded by Govert Pellikaan	Mayor of Vianen; 1967–1971	Succeeded by Jan van Wijk
Preceded by Dirk Rijnders	Mayor of Amstelveen; 1971–1977	Succeeded by Wilhem Quarles van Ufford
Preceded by Hans Gruijters	Minister of Housing and Spatial Planning; 1977–1981	Succeeded by Dany Tuijnman; Ad interim
Preceded by Frans Dijckmeester	Mayor of Apeldoorn; 1981–1985	Succeeded by Ton Hubers
Preceded by Pieter van Dijke	Queen's Commissioner of Utrecht; 1985–1998	Succeeded by Boele Staa
Preceded by Wolter Lemstra	Mayor of Hengelo; Ad interim 1999–2000	Succeeded by Frank Kerckhaert
