= Roel Robbertsen =

Dutch politician

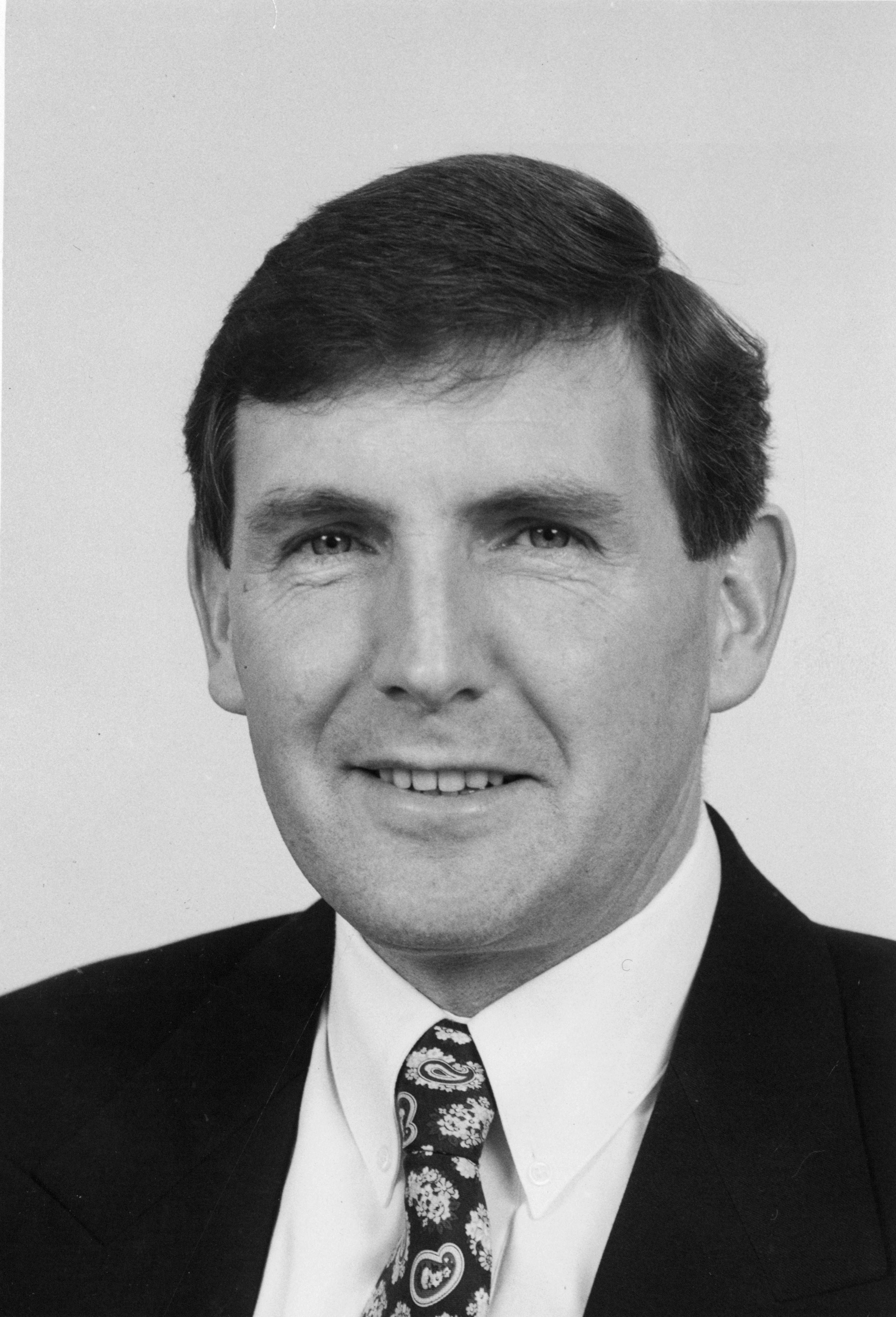
R.C. Robbertsen

Roelof Cornelis (Roel) Robbertsen (born 6 October 1948 in Renswoude) is a Dutch politician and pig farmer. He is a member of the Christian Democratic Appeal. From 1 June 2007 until 7 June 2013 he was Queen's Commissioner of Utrecht.

Robbersen was a member of the municipal council of Renswoude from 1978 to 1990 and also an alderman of this Utrecht municipality from 1979 to 1990. From 1991 to 2002 he was a member of the Provincial Council of Utrecht and from 1995 to 2002 a member of the provincial executive of Utrecht. From 2002 to 2007 he was mayor of Ede.

Roel Robbertsen is married and a member of the Protestant Church in the Netherlands (PKN).

Political offices
Preceded by Willem Blanken	Mayor of Ede; 2002–2007	Succeeded by Tineke Netelenbos
Preceded by Boele Staal	Queen's Commissioner of Utrecht; 2007–2013	Succeeded by Willibrord van Beek
