= Rijnders =

Rijnders is a surname. Notable people with the surname include:

- Anke Rijnders (born 1956), Dutch swimmer
- Nico Rijnders, (1947–1976) Dutch footballer
- Roderick Rijnders, Dutch rower
- Dirk Rijnders, (1909–2006) Dutch politician
- Paul Rijnders, American musician, formerly of Anything Box
