= List of King's and Queen's commissioners of Utrecht =

This article is a list of King's and Queen's commissioners of the province of Utrecht, Netherlands.

== List of King's and Queen's commissioners of Utrecht since 1945 ==
King's and Queen's commissioners of Utrecht		Term of office	Party
Lodewijk Bosch van Rosenthal	Dr. Ridder; Lodewijk Bosch van Rosenthal (1884–1953)	6 May 1945 – 1 November 1946 (1 year, 179 days)^{[Res]}	Christian Historical; Union
Popke Pieter Agter	Popke; Pieter Agter (1903–1969)	1 November 1946 – 20 March 1947 (139 days)^{[Acting]}	Labour Party
Marius Reinalda	Marius Reinalda (1888–1965)	20 March 1947 – 1 July 1954 (7 years, 103 days)	Labour Party
Constant van Lynden van Sandenburg	Count; Constant van Lynden van Sandenburg (1905–1990)	1 July 1954 – 1 March 1970 (15 years, 243 days)	Independent; Liberal (Classical Liberal)
	Dr. Bart Hofman (1921–2019)	1 March 1970 – 16 March 1970 (15 days)^{[Ad Interim]}	People's Party for Freedom and Democracy
Koos Verdam	Dr. Koos Verdam (1915–1998)	16 March 1970 – 1 February 1980 (9 years, 322 days)	Anti-Revolutionary Party
Pieter van Dijke	Pieter van Dijke (1920–2003)	1 February 1980 – 16 October 1985 (5 years, 257 days)	Anti-Revolutionary Party (1980)
Pieter van Dijke	Pieter van Dijke (1920–2003)	1 February 1980 – 16 October 1985 (5 years, 257 days)	Christian; Democratic Appeal (1980–1985)
Pieter Beelaerts van Blokland	Jonkheer; Pieter Beelaerts van Blokland (1932-2021)	16 October 1985 – 1 January 1998 (12 years, 77 days)	Christian; Democratic Appeal
	Boele Staal (born 1947)	1 January 1998 – 1 January 2007 (9 years, 0 days)	Democrats 66
	Jan Pieter; Lokker (born 1949)	1 January 2007 – 7 June 2007 (157 days)^{[Ad Interim]}	Christian; Democratic Appeal
	Roel Robbertsen (born 1948)	7 June 2007 – 6 June 2013 (5 years, 364 days)^{[Res]}	Christian; Democratic Appeal
Ralph de Vries	Ralph de Vries (born 1967)	6 June 2013 – 15 September 2013 (101 days)^{[Ad Interim]}	Democrats 66
Willibrord van Beek	Willibrord van Beek (born 1949)	15 September 2013 – 1 February 2019 (5 years, 139 days)^{[Acting]}	People's Party for Freedom and Democracy
	Hans Oosters (born 1962)	1 February 2019 – Incumbent (6 years, 287 days)	Labour Party
