= Ahmed Marcouch =

Moroccan-Dutch politician

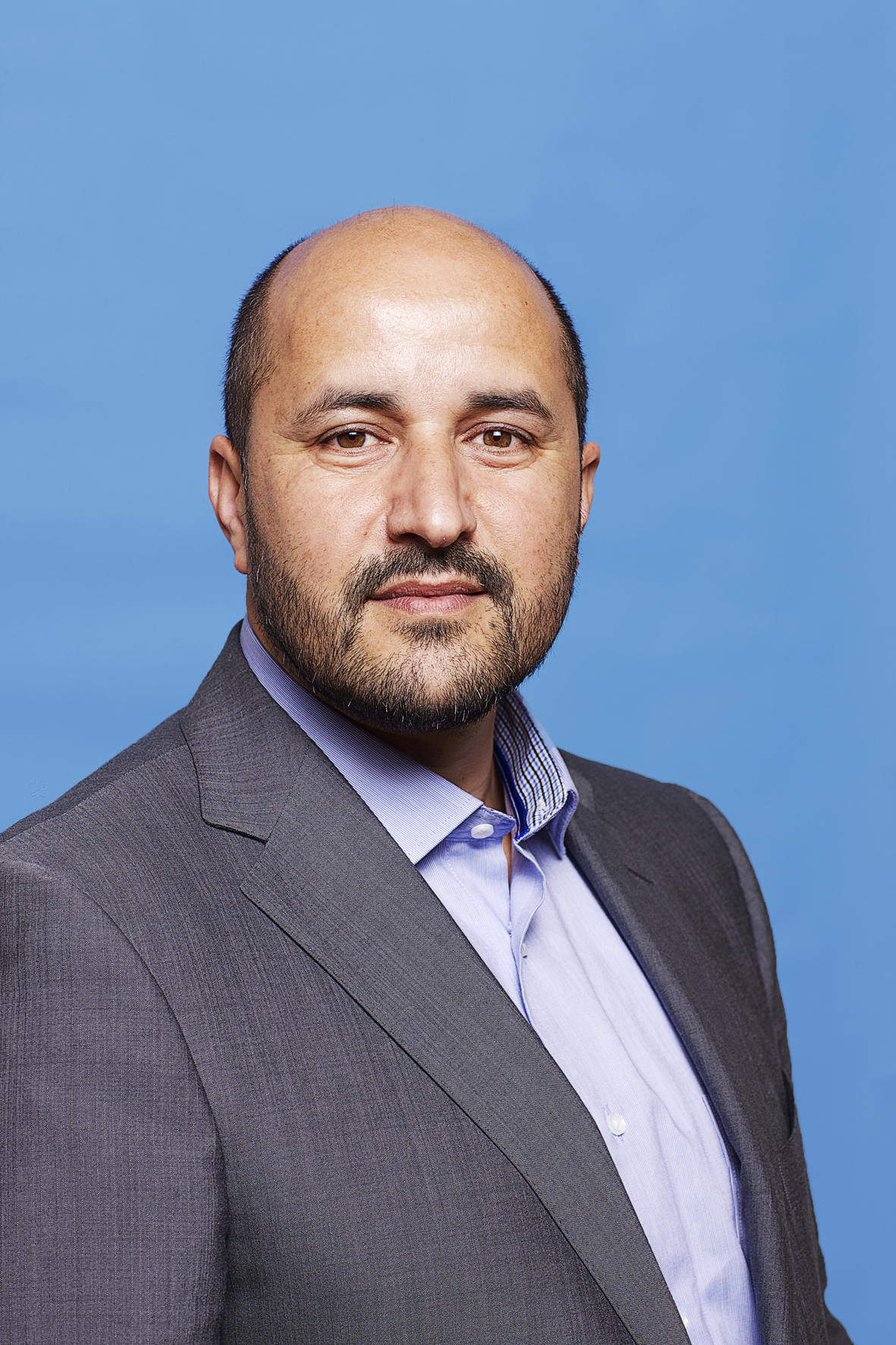

Mayor of Arnhem
- Incumbent
- Assumed office 1 September 2017
- Preceded by: Boele Staal (Acting)

Member of the House of Representatives
- In office 17 June 2010 – 23 March 2017

Personal details
- Born: Ahmed Marcouch; May 2, 1969 (age 57) Bni Bouifrour, Morocco
- Party: Labour Party
- Education: Amsterdam University of Applied Sciences (BA)
- Occupation: Politician, police officer, civil servant, educator
- Website: (in Dutch) Labour Party website

Ahmed Marcouch (Arabic: أحمد مركوش; born 2 May 1969) is a Moroccan-Dutch politician, former police officer, civil servant and educator serving as Mayor of Arnhem since 2017. A member of the Labour Party (PvdA), he was a member of the House of Representatives from 17 June 2010 to 23 March 2017. He focused on matters of community development.

He was a member of the municipal council of Amsterdam from 11 March 2010 to 8 September 2010 and previously chaired the Slotervaart borough government from 1 May 2006 to 11 March 2010. Since 1 September 2017, he has been Mayor of Arnhem, replacing Herman Kaiser (CDA).

On March 29, 2023, Marcouch was recommended by the Arnhem City Council for a second term as mayor.

== Personal life ==
Marcouch is married and has one son. From his first marriage, he has three children.
