= Renswoude =

- Municipality
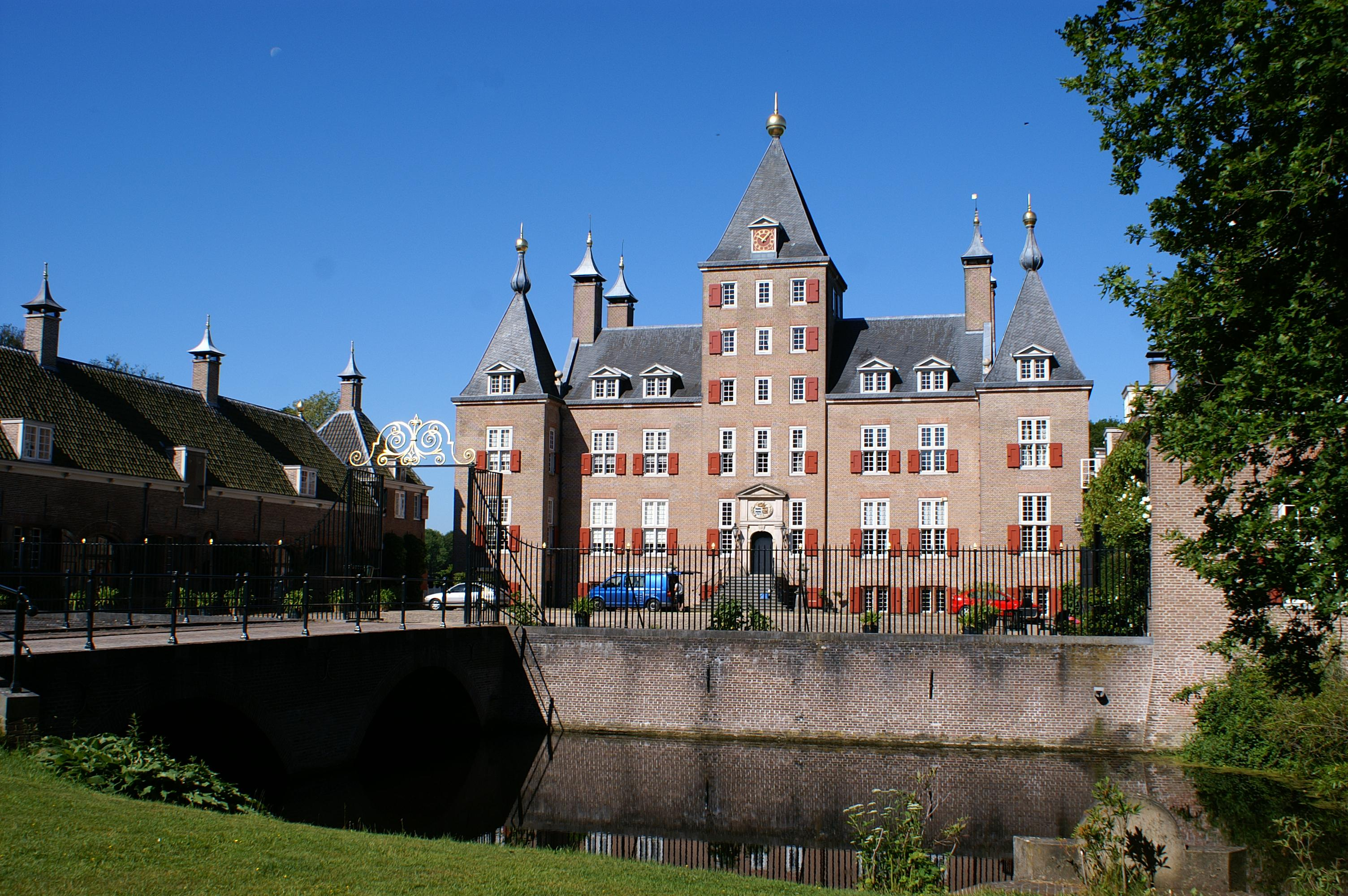
- Renswoude Castle

- Flag Coat of arms

- Location in Utrecht
- Coordinates: 52°4′N 5°33′E
- Country: Netherlands
- Province: Utrecht

Government
  - Body: Municipal council
  - Mayor: Petra Doornenbal-van der Vlist (CDA)

Area
  - Total: 18.51 km^{2} (7.15 sq mi)
  - Land: 18.40 km^{2} (7.10 sq mi)
  - Water: 0.11 km^{2} (0.042 sq mi)
- Elevation: 8 m (26 ft)

Population (January 2021)
  - Total: 5,556
  - Density: 302/km^{2} (780/sq mi)
- Time zone: UTC+1 (CET)
  - Summer (DST): UTC+2 (CEST)
- Postcode: 3927
- Area code: 0318
- Website: www.renswoude.nl

Renswoude (Dutch pronunciation: [rɛnsˈʋʌudə]) is a municipality and a town in the central Netherlands, in the province of Utrecht.

== Topography ==
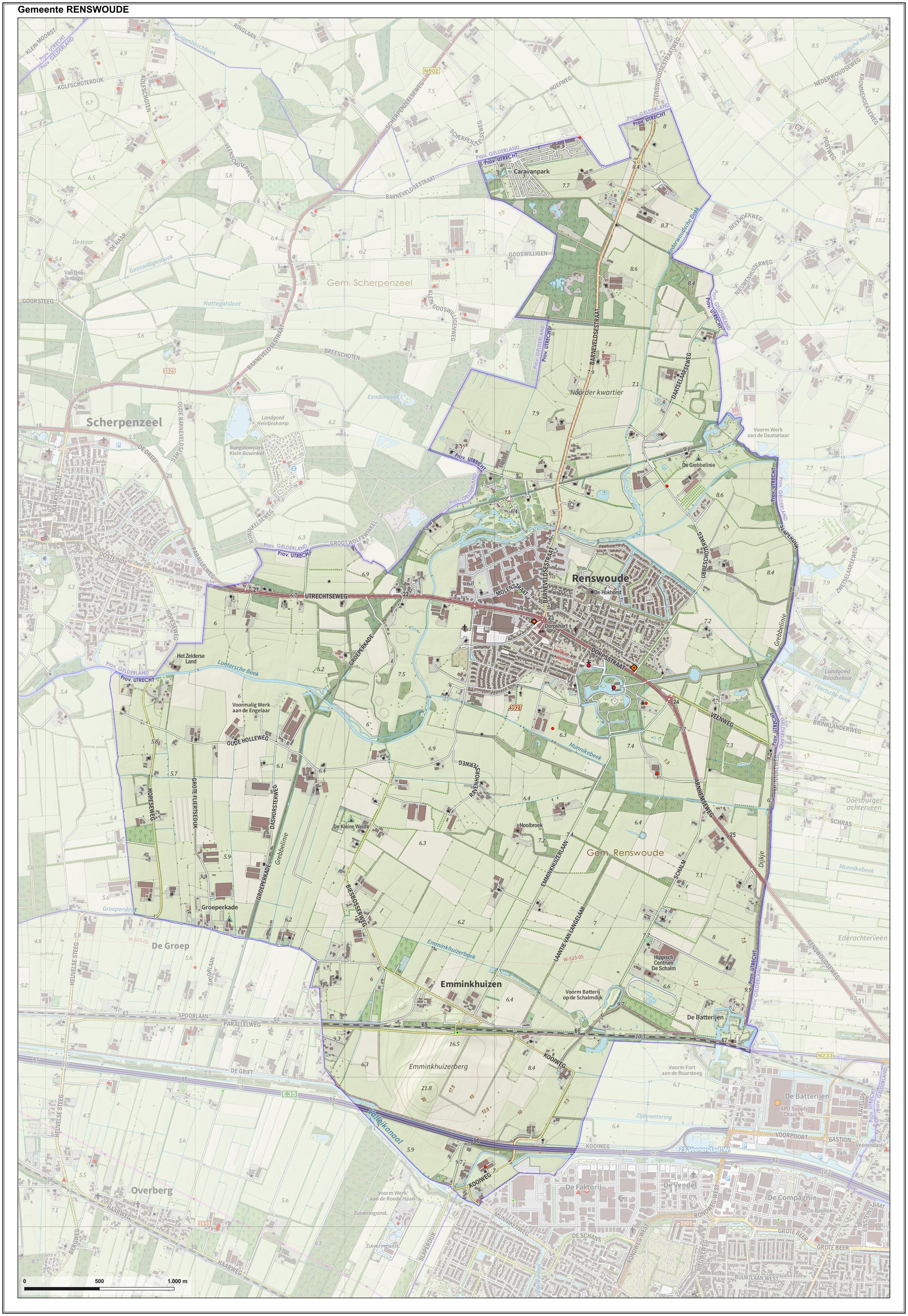

Dutch Topographic map of the municipality of Renswoude, June 2015

== Notable people ==
- Jan Hendrik Waszink (1908–1990) a Dutch Latin scholar and academic
- Roel Robbertsen (born 1948) a Dutch politician and pig farmer
- Henk-Jan Held (born 1967) a volleyball player, team silver medallist at the 1992 Summer Olympics and team gold medallist at the 1996 Summer Olympics
- Maarten Van Garderen (born 1990) a Dutch male volleyball player, member of the Netherlands men's national volleyball team

== Gallery ==
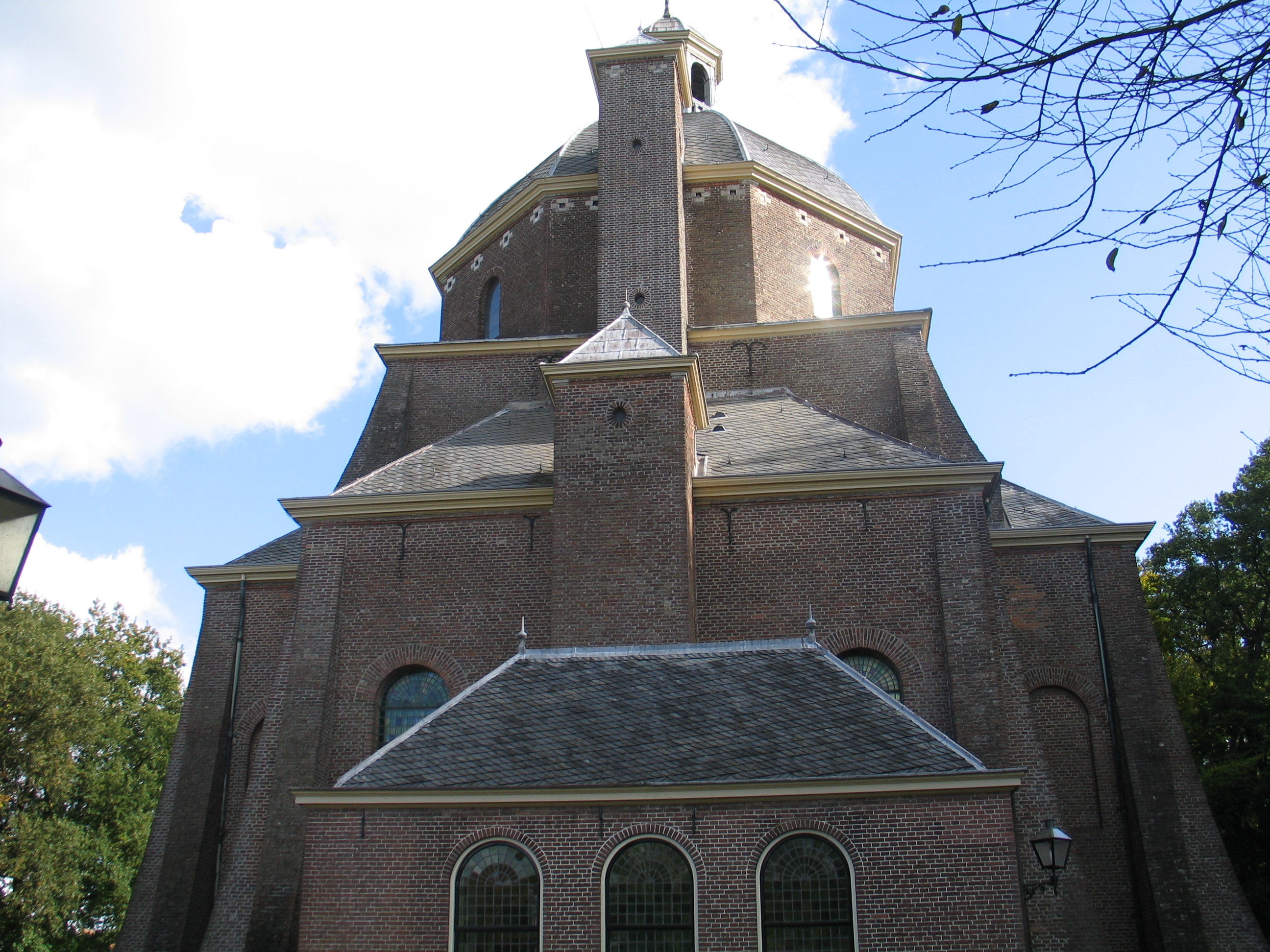
Church designed by Jacob van Campen for the grandfather of Maria Duyst van Voorhout's husband

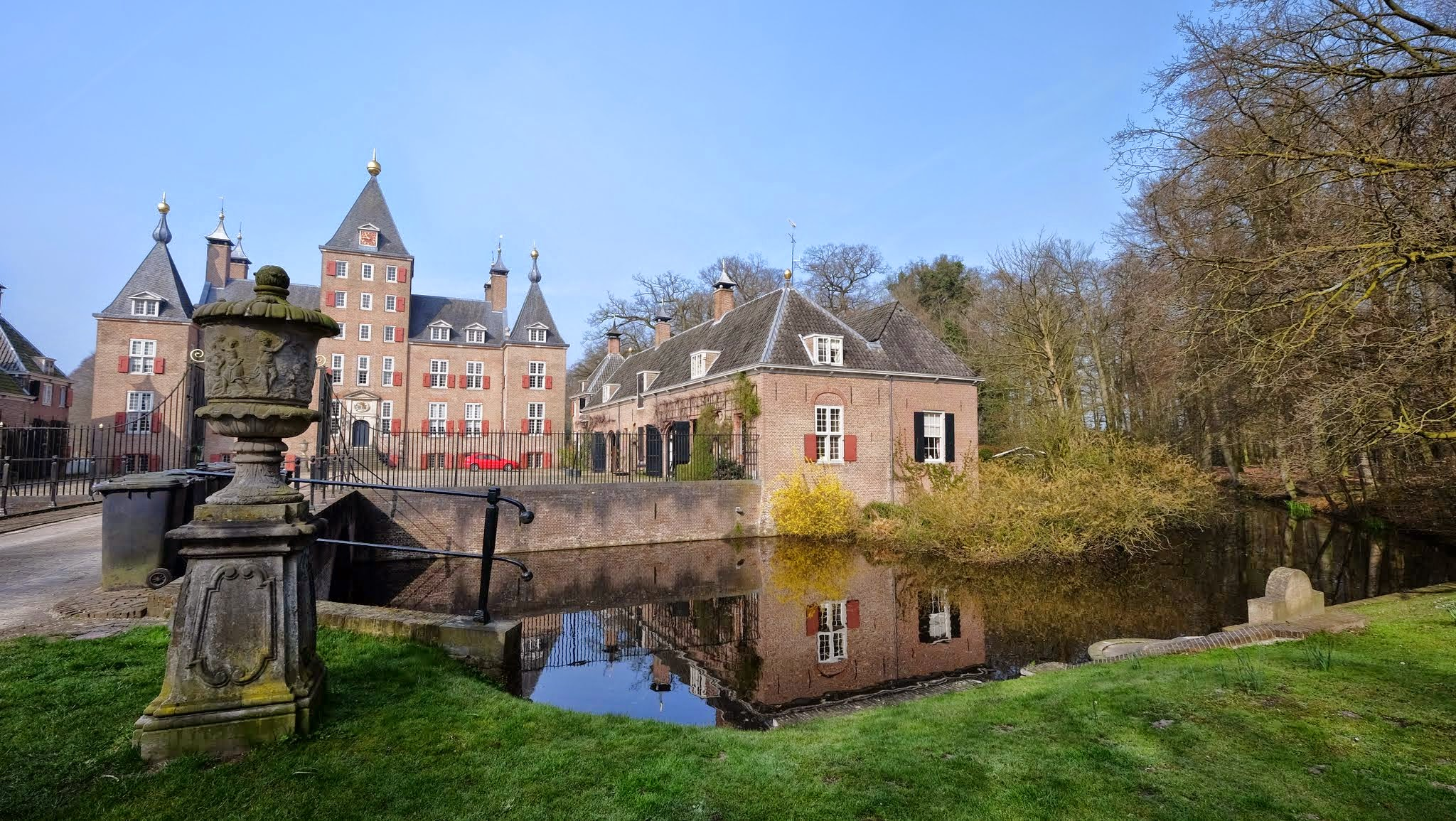
Renswoude Castle

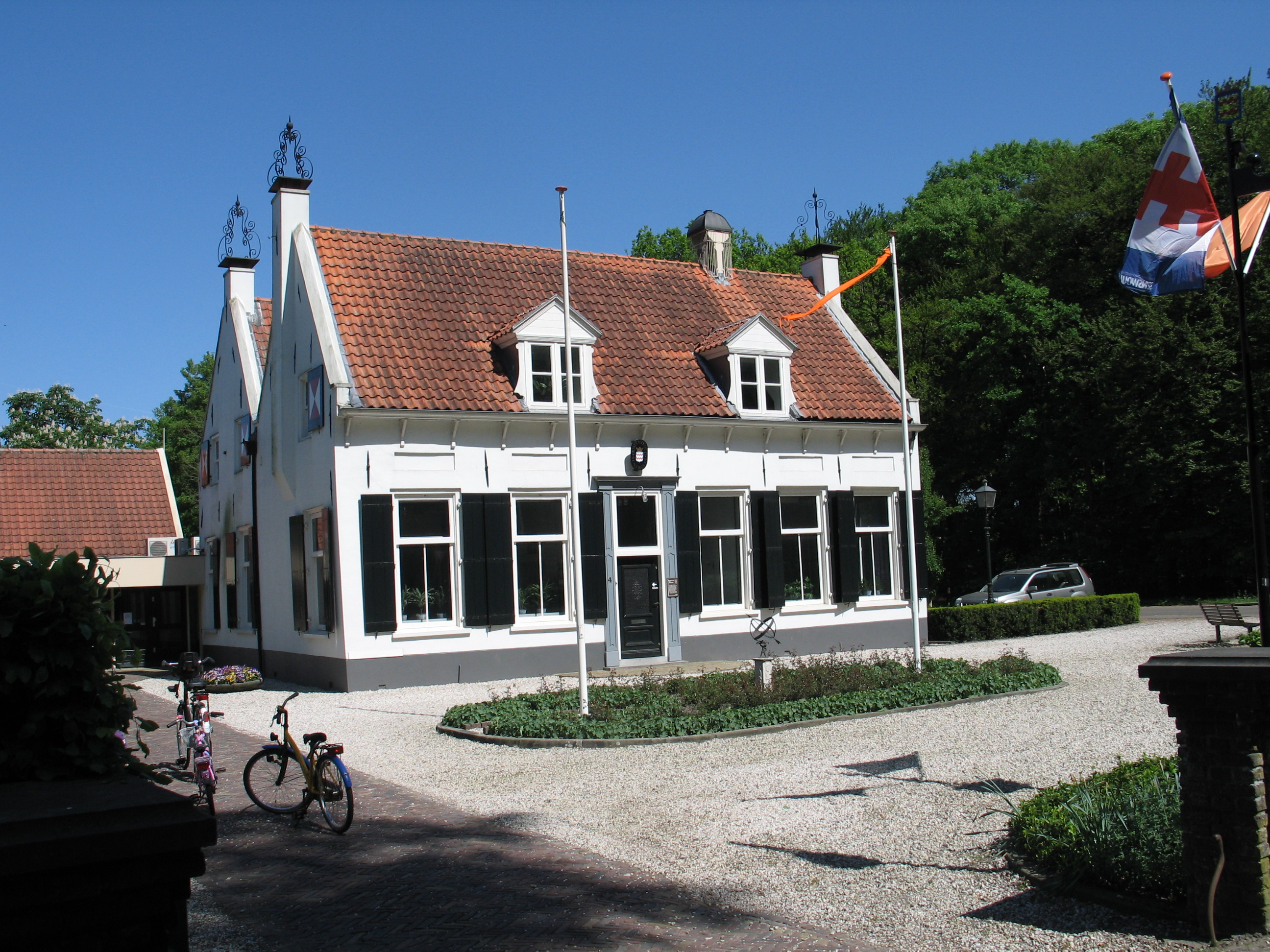
Gemeentehuis, Renswoude
