= Tjerk Westerterp =

Dutch politician and diplomat (1930–2023)

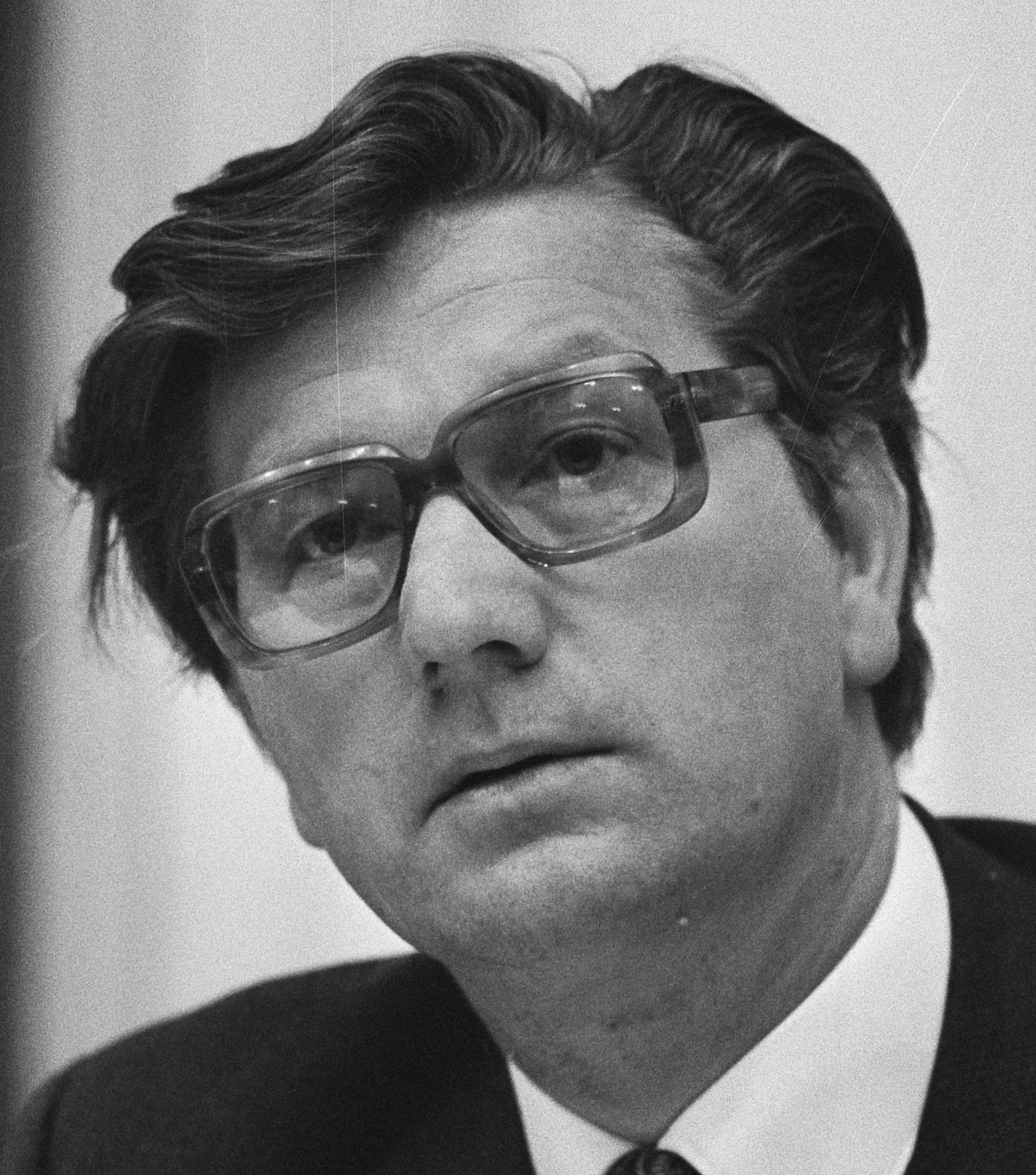
- Tjerk Westerterp in 1974

Minister of Transport and Water Management
- In office 11 May 1973 – 19 December 1977
- Prime Minister: Joop den Uyl
- Preceded by: Bé Udink
- Succeeded by: Dany Tuijnman

State Secretary of Foreign Affairs
- In office 17 August 1971 – 7 March 1973
- Prime Minister: Barend Biesheuvel
- Preceded by: Hans de Koster
- Succeeded by: Laurens Jan Brinkhorst; Pieter Kooijmans

Member of the European Parliament
- In office 8 May 1967 – 17 August 1971
- Parliamentary group: Christian Democratic Group
- Constituency: Netherlands

Member of the House of Representatives
- In office 22 December 1977 – 15 February 1978
- In office 8 June 1977 – 8 September 1977
- In office 7 December 1972 – 11 May 1973
- In office 31 July 1963 – 17 August 1971

Personal details
- Born: Theodorus Engelbertus Westerterp; 2 December 1930 Rotterdam, Netherlands
- Died: 7 October 2023 (aged 92) Ulvenhout, Netherlands
- Party: Christian Democratic Appeal (from 2002)
- Other political affiliations: Livable Netherlands (2001–2002); Christian Democratic Appeal (1980–2001); Catholic People's Party (until 1980)
- Spouse: Ine van Lier (m. 1960)
- Children: Four
- Education: Radboud University Nijmegen (Bachelor of Social Science, Master of Arts)
- Occupation: Politician · Diplomat · Civil servant · Journalist · Editor · Author · Businessman · Corporate director · Nonprofit director · Political consultant · Lobbyist

Theodorus Engelbertus "Tjerk" Westerterp (2 December 1930 – 7 October 2023) was a Dutch politician and diplomat of the defunct Catholic People's Party (KVP) now merged into the Christian Democratic Appeal (CDA) party and businessman.

== Early life ==
Westerterp attended a gymnasium in Rotterdam from April 1943 until May 1949 and applied at the Radboud University Nijmegen in June 1949 majoring in Political science, obtaining a Bachelor of Social Science degree in 1951 before switching to Journalism and graduating with a Master of Arts degree in Journalism in July 1953. Westerterp worked as a journalist and editor for the De Maasbode from June 1949 until July 1953, and as a civil servant for the European Coal and Steel Community (ECSC) in Luxembourg City from July 1953 until July 1963.

== Political career ==
Westerterp became a member of the House of Representatives after Gerard Veldkamp was appointed Minister of Social Affairs and Health in the Marijnen cabinet after the 1963 general election, taking office on 31 July 1963, serving as a frontbencher and chairing the special parliamentary committee for Academic degrees and spokesperson for European affairs, Benelux, transport, aviation and deputy spokesperson for foreign affairs and NATO. Westerterp was selected as a Member of the European Parliament and dual served in those positions, taking office on 8 May 1967. He also served as Vice-President of the European Parliament from 9 March 1971 until 17 August 1971. After the 1971 general election, Westerterp was appointed State Secretary of Foreign Affairs in the Biesheuvel I cabinet, taking office on 17 August 1971. The cabinet fell just one year later on 19 July 1972 and continued to serve in a demissionary capacity until the first cabinet formation of 1972 when it was replaced by the caretaker Biesheuvel II cabinet, with Westerterp continuing as State Secretary of Foreign Affairs, taking office on 9 August 1972. After the 1972 general election, Westerterp returned to the House of Representatives, taking office on 7 December 1972 but he was still serving in the cabinet and because of dualism customs in the constitutional convention of Dutch politics he could not serve a dual mandate he subsequently resigned as State Secretary of Foreign Affairs on 7 March 1973.

Following the second cabinet formation of 1972 Westerterp was appointed Minister of Transport and Water Management in the Den Uyl cabinet, taking office on 11 May 1973. He took many measures that had a lasting positive impact on traffic safety in the Netherlands, like making seat belts and the moped helmet mandatory. He was also responsible for the decision to build the Eastern Scheldt storm surge barrier. The cabinet fell on 22 March 1977 after four years of tensions in the coalition and continued to serve in a demissionary capacity.

After the election of 1977 Westerterp again returned as a Member of the House of Representatives, taking office on 8 June 1977 but because of the dualism customs he resigned his seat in the House of Representatives on 8 September 1977. Following the cabinet formation of 1977, the Den Uyl cabinet was replaced by the Van Agt–Wiegel cabinet on 19 December 1977, and Westerterp was not given a cabinet post in the new cabinet and he subsequently returned to the House of Representatives following the appointment of Til Gardeniers-Berendsen as Minister of Culture, Recreation and Social Work in the new cabinet, taking office on 22 December 1977 serving as a backbencher.

In January 1978, Westerterp was nominated as Chief executive officer (CEO) and Chairman of the Board of directors of the Amsterdam Stock Exchange, he resigned as a Member of the House of Representatives the same day he was installed as CEO and Chairman on 15 February 1978. As CEO of the Amsterdam Stock Exchange he came up with the idea of the AEX index.

Westerterp also became active in the private sector and public sector and occupied numerous seats as a corporate director and nonprofit director on several boards of directors and supervisory boards (DSB Bank, Radio Netherlands Worldwide, DSM Company, Van Lanschot, Atlantic Association, Randstad NV and the Institute of International Relations Clingendael) and served on several state commissions and councils on behalf of the government (Public Pension Funds APB, Cadastre Agency and the Advisory Council for Foreign Affairs) and as an advocate and lobbyist for Highway engineering improvements and European integration and as a political consultant for the Livable Netherlands (LN) party.

Westerterp was known for his abilities as a manager and a "policy wonk". Westerterp continued to comment on political affairs.

Westerterp died on 8 October 2023, at the age of 92.

== Decorations ==
Honours
| Ribbon bar | Honour | Country | Date | Comment |
|---|---|---|---|---|
| | Officer of the Order of Leopold II | Belgium | 7 April 1972 | |
| | Knight of the Order of the Holy Sepulchre | Holy See | 22 July 1974 | |
| | Officer of the Order of the Oak Crown | Luxembourg | 30 September 1975 | |
| | Commander of the Order of Orange-Nassau | Netherlands | 11 April 1978 | |

Political offices
| Preceded by Hans de Koster | State Secretary of Foreign Affairs; 1971–1973 | Succeeded by Laurens Jan Brinkhorst; Pieter Kooijmans |
| Preceded by Bé Udink | Minister of Transport and Water Management; 1973–1977 | Succeeded by Dany Tuijnman |
Business positions
| Unknown | CEO and Chairman of the Board of directors of the Amsterdam Stock Exchange; 1978–1993 | Unknown |
