= Jan Schaefer =

Dutch politician

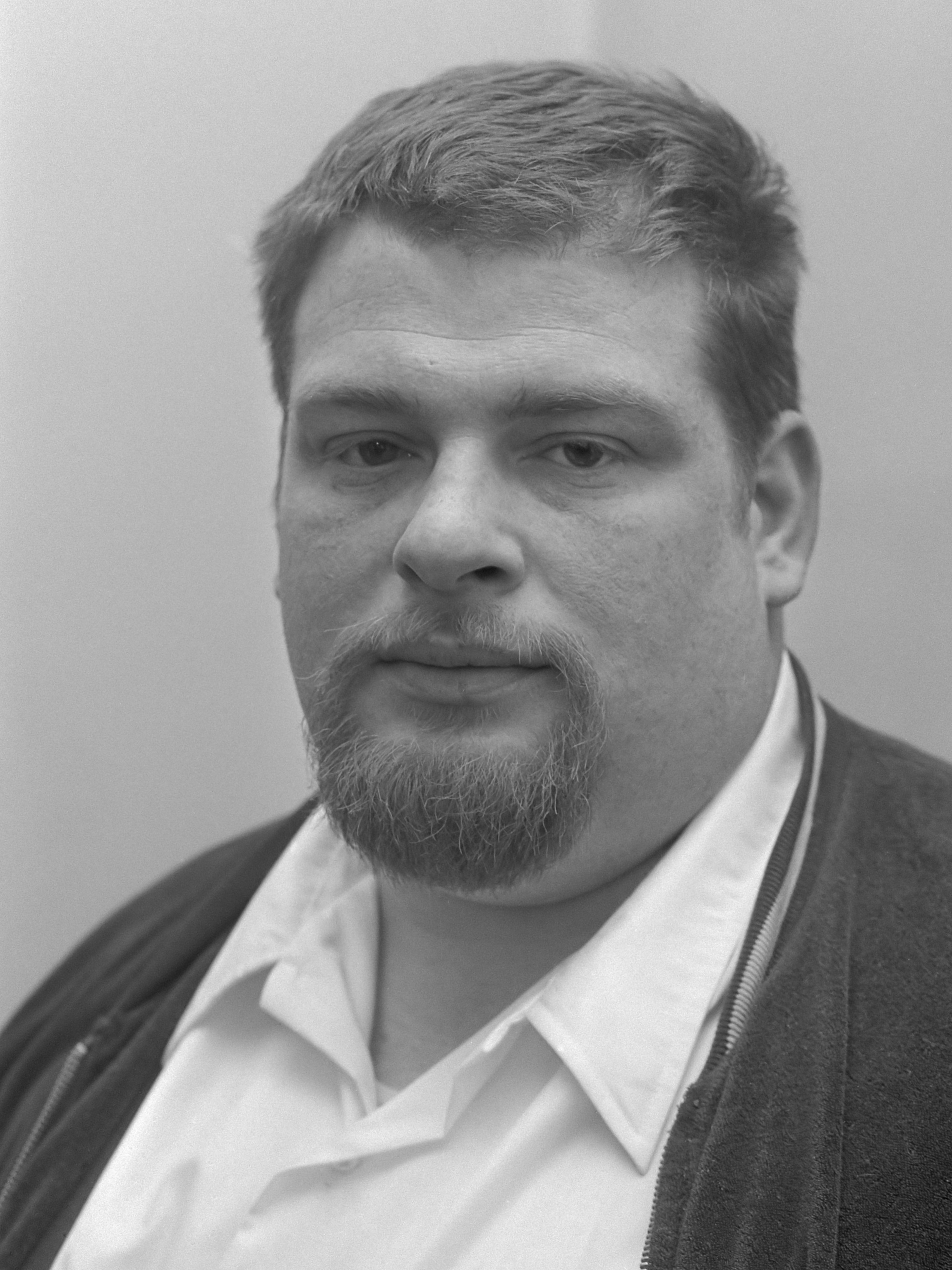
- Schaefer in 1971

State Secretary for Housing and Spatial Planning
- In office 11 May 1973 – 8 September 1977 Serving with Marcel van Dam
- Prime Minister: Joop den Uyl
- Preceded by: Werner Buck
- Succeeded by: Gerrit Brokx

Member of the House of Representatives
- In office 3 June 1986 – 23 February 1990
- In office 8 June 1977 – 6 September 1978
- In office 11 May 1971 – 11 May 1973

Personal details
- Born: Johannes Lodewijk Nicolaas Schaefer; 16 March 1940 Amsterdam, Netherlands
- Died: 30 January 1994 (aged 53) Amsterdam, Netherlands
- Cause of death: Diabetes mellitus
- Party: Labour Party (from 1969)
- Other political affiliations: Communist Party of the Netherlands (1960–1965)
- Spouse: Alberdina Grootes (m. 1964)
- Children: 1 son and 1 daughter
- Occupation: Politician · Pastry chef · Community organiser · Activist

Johannes Lodewijk Nicolaas "Jan" Schaefer (16 March 1940 – 30 January 1994) was a Dutch politician and community organiser who served as State Secretary for Housing and Spatial Planning from 1973 to 1977 under Joop den Uyl's cabinet. He was a member of the Communist Party of the Netherlands (CPN) until 1965, before he joined the Labour Party (PvdA) in 1969. Schaefer was first elected to the House of Representatives in the 1971 general election, where held a seat with interruptions until 1990, dealing with matters around urban renewal, urban planning, spatial planning, public housing and community development. He also served as an alderman in the municipal executive of Amsterdam from 1978 to 1986, in charge of housing. His utterances on these issues "In gelul kan je niet wonen" ("You can't live in bullshit") and "Is dit beleid of is hierover nagedacht?" ("Is this policy or has this been thought through?") became catchphrases.

== Legacy ==
Bridge 2000 or Jan Schaeferbrug in Amsterdam's Eastern Docklands, built from 1999 to 2001, was named after him in 2000. Jan Schaeferpad, a street in Amsterdam-Zuidoost, also bears his name since 2000.

Political offices
Preceded by Werner Buck	State Secretary for Housing and Spatial Planning; 1973–1977; With: Marcel van Dam	Succeeded by Gerrit Brokx
