= Dany Tuijnman =

Dutch politician

His Excellency Dany Tuijnman
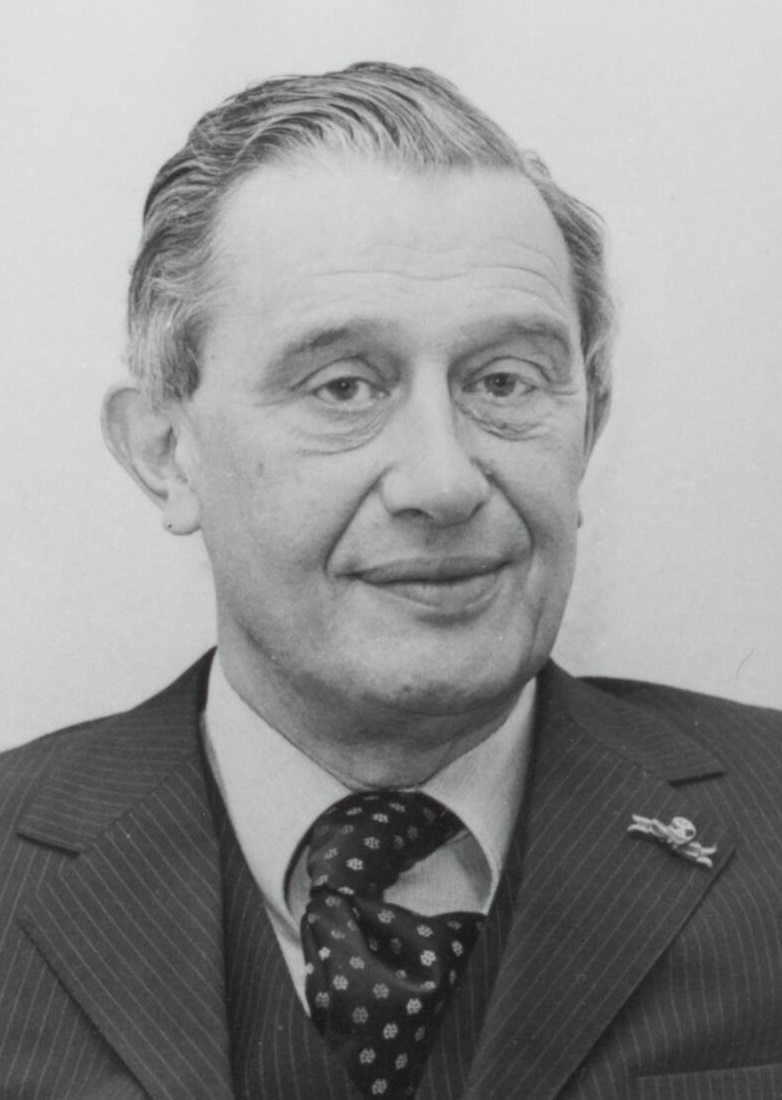
- Tuijnman in 1977

Minister of Housing and Spatial Planning
- In office 1 September 1981 – 11 September 1981; Ad interim
- Prime Minister: Dries van Agt
- Preceded by: Pieter Beelaerts van Blokland
- Succeeded by: Marcel van Dam

Minister of Transport and Water Management
- In office 19 December 1977 – 11 September 1981
- Prime Minister: Dries van Agt
- Preceded by: Tjerk Westerterp
- Succeeded by: Henk Zeevalking

Member of the House of Representatives
- In office 5 June 1963 – 19 December 1977

Personal details
- Born: Daniël Sebastiaan Tuijnman; 16 April 1915 Middelburg, Netherlands
- Died: 25 April 1992 (aged 77) Driebergen, Netherlands
- Party: People's Party for Freedom and Democracy (from 1950)
- Spouse: Hendrika Tichelman (m. 1942; died 1989)
- Children: Liesbeth Tuijnman (born 1943)
- Education: Wageningen University (Bachelor of Science in Agriculture, Master of Science in Engineering)
- Occupation: Politician · Agronomist · Trade unionist

Daniël Sebastiaan "Dany" Tuijnman (16 April 1915 – 25 April 1992) was a Dutch politician of the People's Party for Freedom and Democracy (VVD).

== Decorations ==
Honours
Ribbon bar	Honour	Country	Date	Comment
	Knight of the Order of the Netherlands Lion	Netherlands	5 June 1975	
	Commander of the Order of Orange-Nassau	Netherlands	26 October 1981	

Political offices
Preceded by Tjerk Westerterp	Minister of Transport and Water Management; 1977–1981	Succeeded by Henk Zeevalking
Preceded by Pieter Beelaerts van Blokland	Minister of Housing and Spatial Planning; Ad interim 1981	Succeeded by Marcel van Dam
