= Johannes van Haensbergen =

Dutch painter

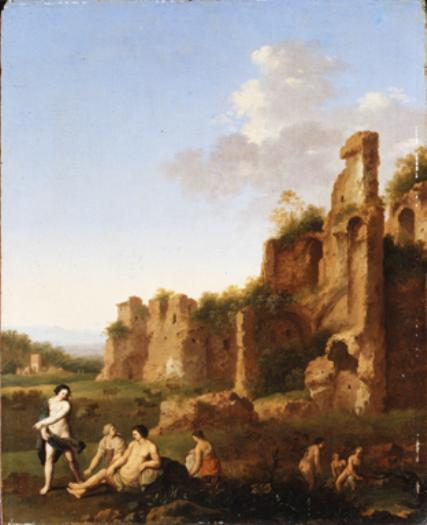
- Italianate landscape by Johannes van Haensbergen.
- Born: 2 January 1642; Gorinchem or Utrecht
- Died: 10 January 1705 (aged 63); The Hague
- Known for: painting
- Movement: Baroque

Johannes (Jan) van Haensbergen (1642–1705) was a Dutch Golden Age painter.

== Biography ==
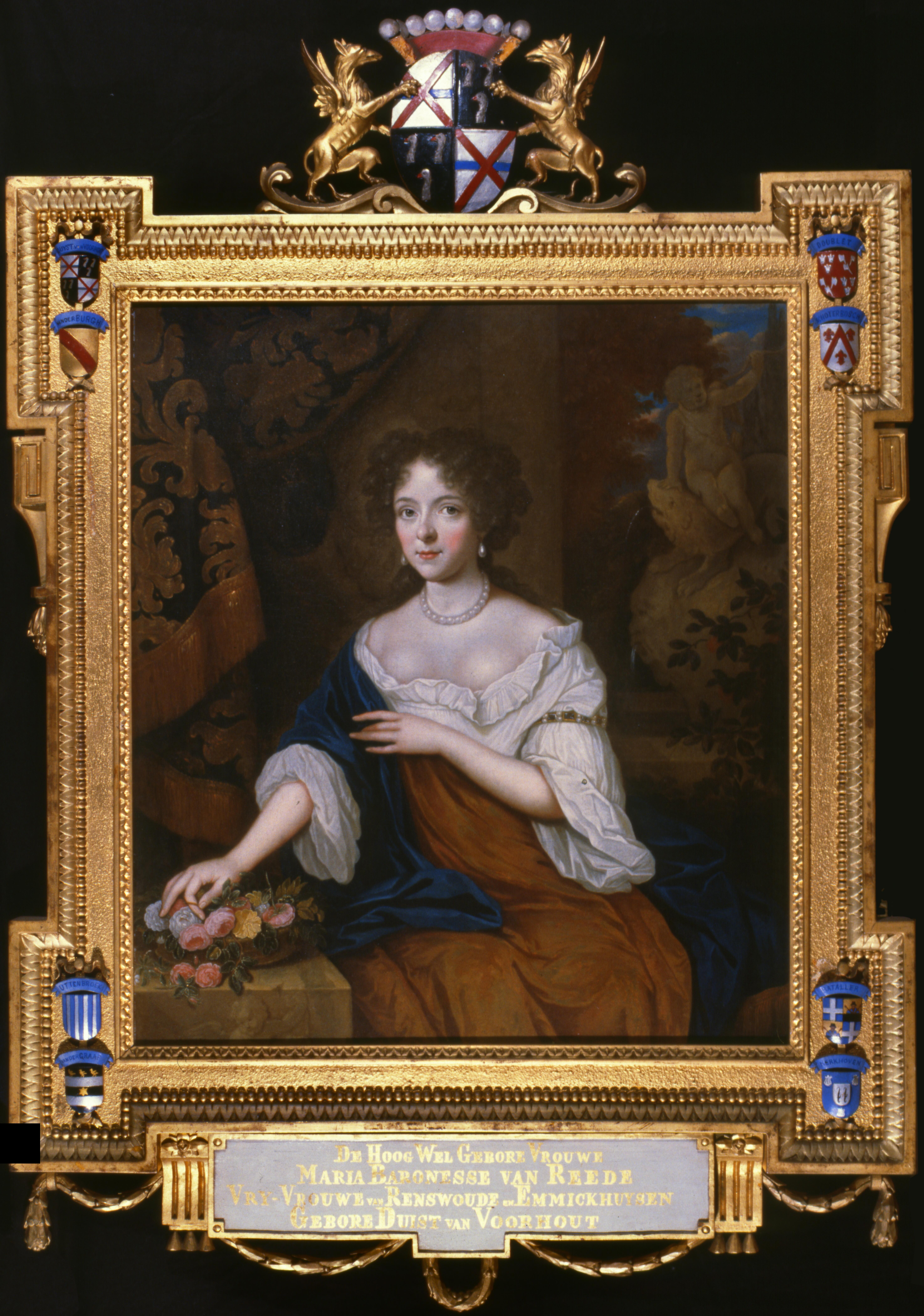
Portrait of Maria Duyst van Voorhout, founder of the Fundatie van Renswoude, ca. 1685-1690

He was registered in the Utrecht Guild of St. Luke in 1668 and in 1669 he was registered in the Confrerie Pictura in The Hague, where he married Johanna van Heusden and worked on portraits for the elite there. According to Houbraken he was born in Utrecht. Because he signed a few paintings with 'Joh. Haensbergh Gorco fecit', which led some art historians to conclude he was from Gorinchem and others that he worked there for a while. He was a student of Cornelius van Poelenburgh, and though he was quite successful in imitating his master's style of landscape painting, he switched to portraits since he could make a comfortable living making flattering ladies portraits that made their skin look whiter.

He became active as an art dealer, probably aided by his appointment as headman of the confrerie, where he also gave lessons, though only his son Willem Johan van Haensbergen (1680–1755), born after his second marriage to Sophia van der Snouck in 1679, is listed as his pupil.

According to Houbraken, Haensbergen became an art dealer in The Hague with a man named "De Jode", who was "Drost van 't Haagse Hof". He may have meant the Baljuw Adriaan Rosa, a wealthy magistrate from The Hague whose brother Johan was consulted in valuing paintings for estate inventories. Houbraken mentioned this same "De Jode" in his biographical sketch of the landscape painter Jan Both, a collaborator with Poelenburgh who Haensbergen probably knew personally. Houbraken remarked on the beauty of a large painting 6 feet high of Argus Panoptes and Mercury that he had once seen himself in De Jode's collection.

His landscapes show the influence of Poelenburgh and his portraits show the influence of Caspar Netscher.
