= Willibrord van Beek =

Dutch politician and financial adviser

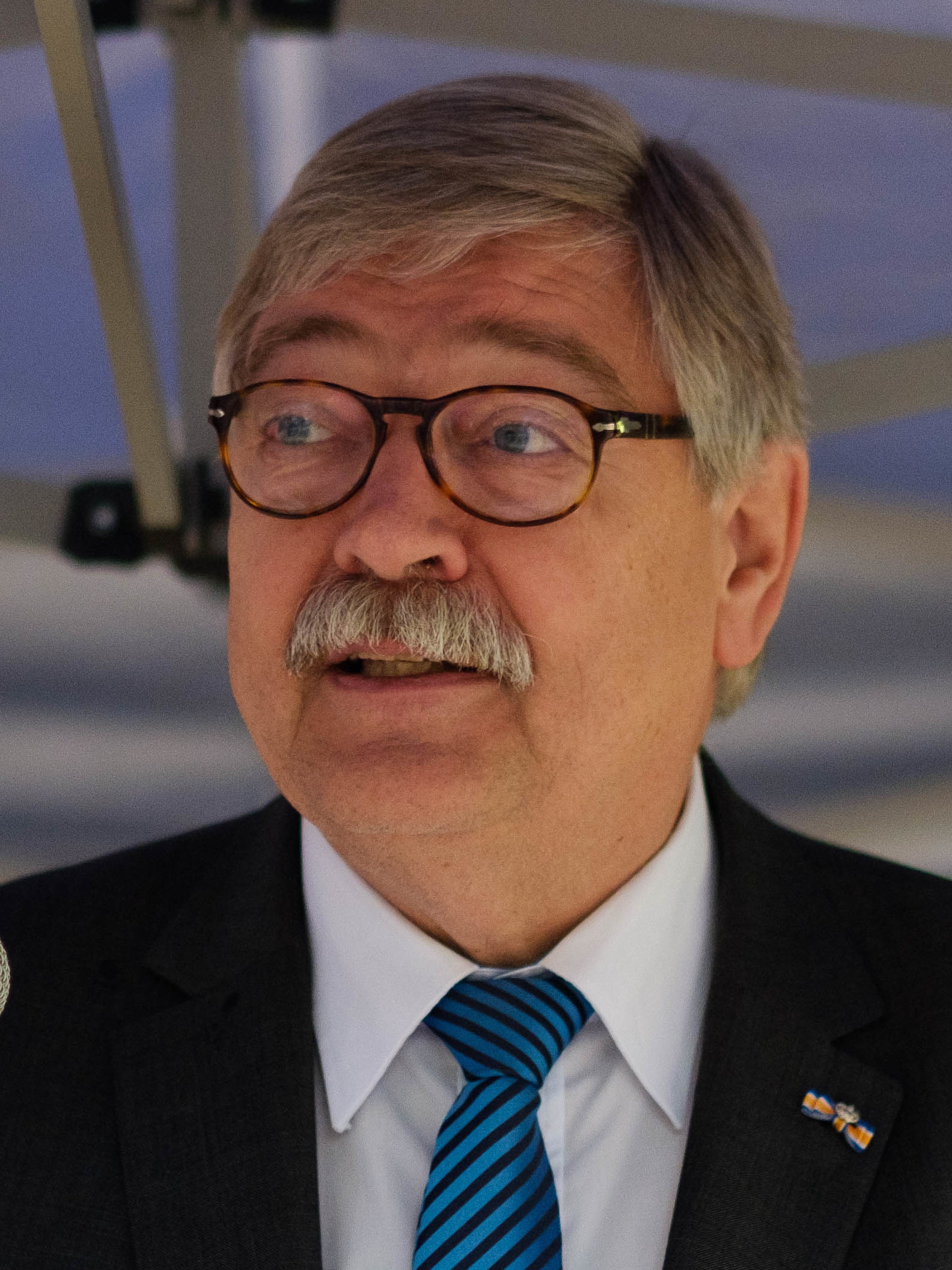
- Van Beek in 2017

King's Commissioner of Utrecht
- In office 15 September 2013 – 1 February 2019
- Monarch: Willem-Alexander
- Preceded by: Roel Robbertsen
- Succeeded by: Hans Oosters

Mayor of Bernheze
- In office 29 October 2012 – 15 September 2013; Ad interim
- Preceded by: Jan Boelhouwer
- Succeeded by: Marieke Moorman

Parliamentary leader in the House of Representatives
- In office 8 March 2006 – 29 June 2006
- Preceded by: Jozias van Aartsen
- Succeeded by: Mark Rutte
- Parliamentary group: People's Party for Freedom and Democracy

Member of the House of Representatives
- In office 19 May 1998 – 20 September 2012

Personal details
- Born: Willibrordus Ildefonsus Ignatius van Beek; 15 January 1949 (age 77) Amsterdam, Netherlands
- Party: People's Party for Freedom and Democracy (from 1973)
- Children: 2 daughters
- Education: Amsterdam University of Applied Sciences (Bachelor of Economics)
- Occupation: Politician · Financial adviser · Corporate director · Nonprofit director

Willibrordus Ildefonsus Ignatius "Willibrord" van Beek (born 15 January 1949) is a retired Dutch politician and financial adviser. He is a member of the People's Party for Freedom and Democracy (VVD).

As a member of the People's Party for Freedom and Democracy (Volkspartij voor Vrijheid en Democratie, VVD) he was a member of the House of Representatives from 19 May 1998 to 19 September 2012. From 8 March until 29 June 2006 he was parliamentary leader. He focused on matters of public administration, administrative law and defence.

Between October 2012 and 15 September 2013 he was Acting Mayor of Bernheze; he served until his appointment as the King's Commissioner of Utrecht. He served in an acting capacity until 1 January 2015; on 1 February 2019, he was succeeded by Hans Oosters.

== Electoral history ==
A (possibly incomplete) overview of Dutch elections Willibrord van Beek participated in
Election	Party	Candidate number	Votes
1998 Dutch general election	People's Party for Freedom and Democracy	17	1.012
2002 Dutch general election	People's Party for Freedom and Democracy	17	1.012
2003 Dutch general election	People's Party for Freedom and Democracy	17	1.623
2006 Dutch general election	People's Party for Freedom and Democracy	10	1.619
2010 Dutch municipal elections in Cranendonck	People's Party for Freedom and Democracy	13	9
2010 Dutch general election	People's Party for Freedom and Democracy	15	2.002
2022 Dutch municipal elections in Cranendonck	People's Party for Freedom and Democracy	17	
2026 Dutch municipal elections in Cranendonck	People's Party for Freedom and Democracy	19	10

== Decorations ==
Honours
Ribbon bar	Honour	Country	Date	Comment
	Knight of the Order of Orange-Nassau	Netherlands	19 September 2012	

Party political offices
Preceded by Jozias van Aartsen	Parliamentary leader of the People's Party for Freedom and Democracy in the House of Representatives; 2006	Succeeded by Mark Rutte
Political offices
Preceded by Jan Boelhouwer	Mayor of Bernheze; Ad interim 2012–2013	Succeeded by Marieke Moorman
Preceded by Roel Robbertsen	King's Commissioner of Utrecht; 2013–2019	Succeeded by Hans Oosters
