= Koos Verdam =

Dutch politician (1915–1998)

His Excellency Koos Verdam
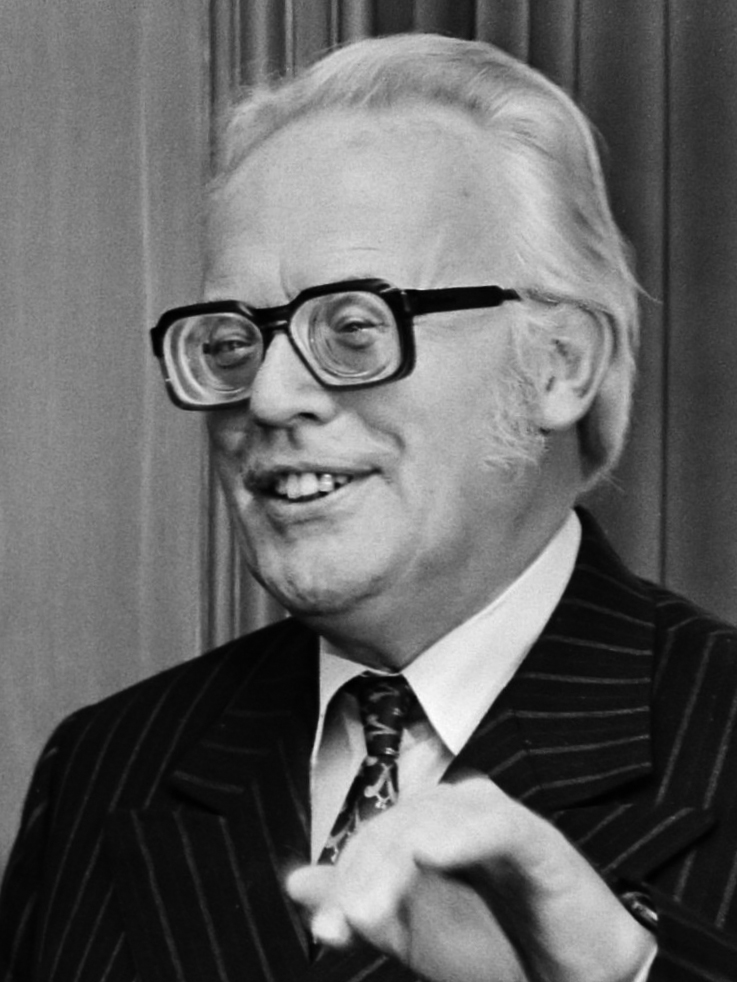
- Koos Verdam in (1977)

Extraordinary Member of the Council of State
- In office 1 March 1980 – 1 February 1985
- Vice President: Marinus Ruppert (1980); Willem Scholten (1980–1985)

Queen's Commissioner of Utrecht
- In office 16 March 1970 – 1 February 1980
- Monarch: Juliana
- Preceded by: Constant van Lynden van Sandenburg
- Succeeded by: Pieter van Dijke

Member of the Senate
- In office 23 May 1967 – 16 March 1970

Minister of the Interior
- In office 5 September 1966 – 5 April 1967
- Prime Minister: Jo Cals (1966); Jelle Zijlstra (1966–1967)
- Preceded by: Ivo Samkalden (ad interim)
- Succeeded by: Henk Beernink

Personal details
- Born: Pieter Jacobus Verdam; 15 January 1915 Amsterdam, Netherlands
- Died: 11 March 1998 (aged 83) Bilthoven, Netherlands
- Party: Christian Democratic Appeal (from 1980)
- Other political affiliations: Anti-Revolutionary Party (until 1980)
- Spouse: Jantina Boomsma (m. 1943)
- Children: Louwrens Verdam (1947–2006); Tjeerd Jan Verdam (1948–2013); 5 other children
- Education: Vrije Universiteit Amsterdam (Bachelor of Laws, Master of Laws, Doctor of Philosophy)
- Occupation: Politician · Jurist · Researcher · Academic administrator · Professor

Pieter Jacobus "Koos" Verdam (15 January 1915 – 11 March 1998) was a Dutch politician of the defunct Anti-Revolutionary Party (ARP) now merged into the Christian Democratic Appeal (CDA).

The reformed Verdam was a professor for Roman law and international civil law at the Vrije Universiteit Amsterdam and from 1959 to 1960 its Rector Magnificus. From 1966 to 1967 he was the Minister of the Interior and Kingdom Relations in the Zijlstra cabinet. In 1970 he became the Queen's Commissioner of Utrecht.

== Decorations ==
Honours
Ribbon bar	Honour	Country	Date	Comment
	Knight of the Order of the Netherlands Lion	Netherlands	3 June 1963	
	Grand Officer of the Order of Orange-Nassau	Netherlands	1 February 1980	Elevated from Commander (27 April 1967)

Political offices
Preceded by Ivo Samkalden; Ad interim	Minister of the Interior; 1966–1967	Succeeded by Henk Beernink
Preceded by Constant van Lynden van Sandenburg	Queen's Commissioner of Utrecht; 1970–1980	Succeeded by Pieter van Dijke
Academic offices
Preceded by Gerrit Cornelis Berkouwer	Rector Magnificus of the Vrije Universiteit Amsterdam; 1959–1960	Succeeded by Isaäc Arend Diepenhorst
