= Maria Duyst van Renswoude =

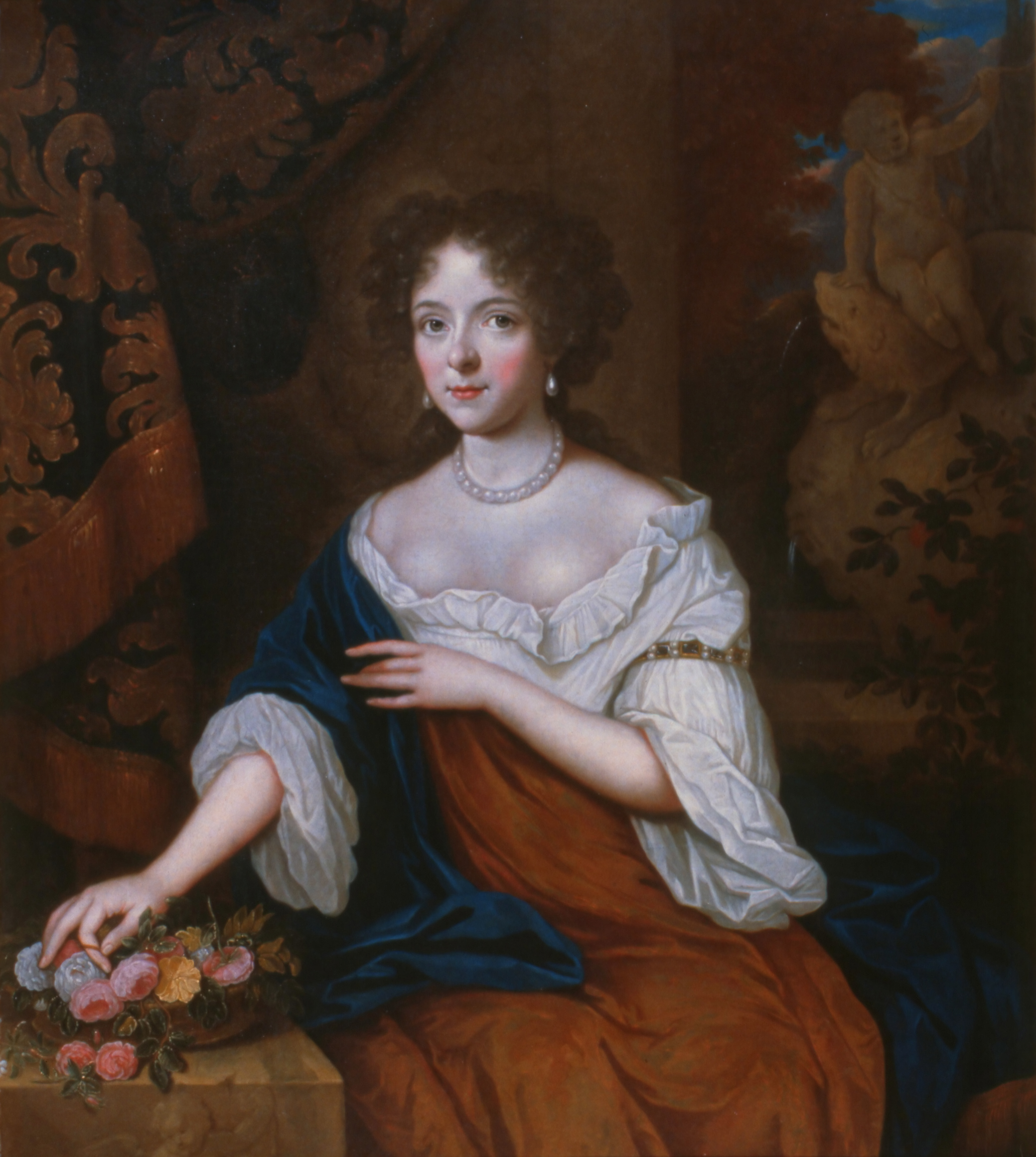
Portrait of Maria Duyst van Voorhout (1662-1754), by Jan van Haensbergen

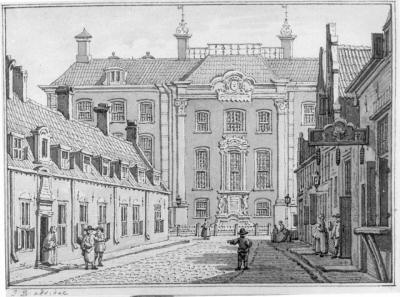
Fundatiehuis Utrecht

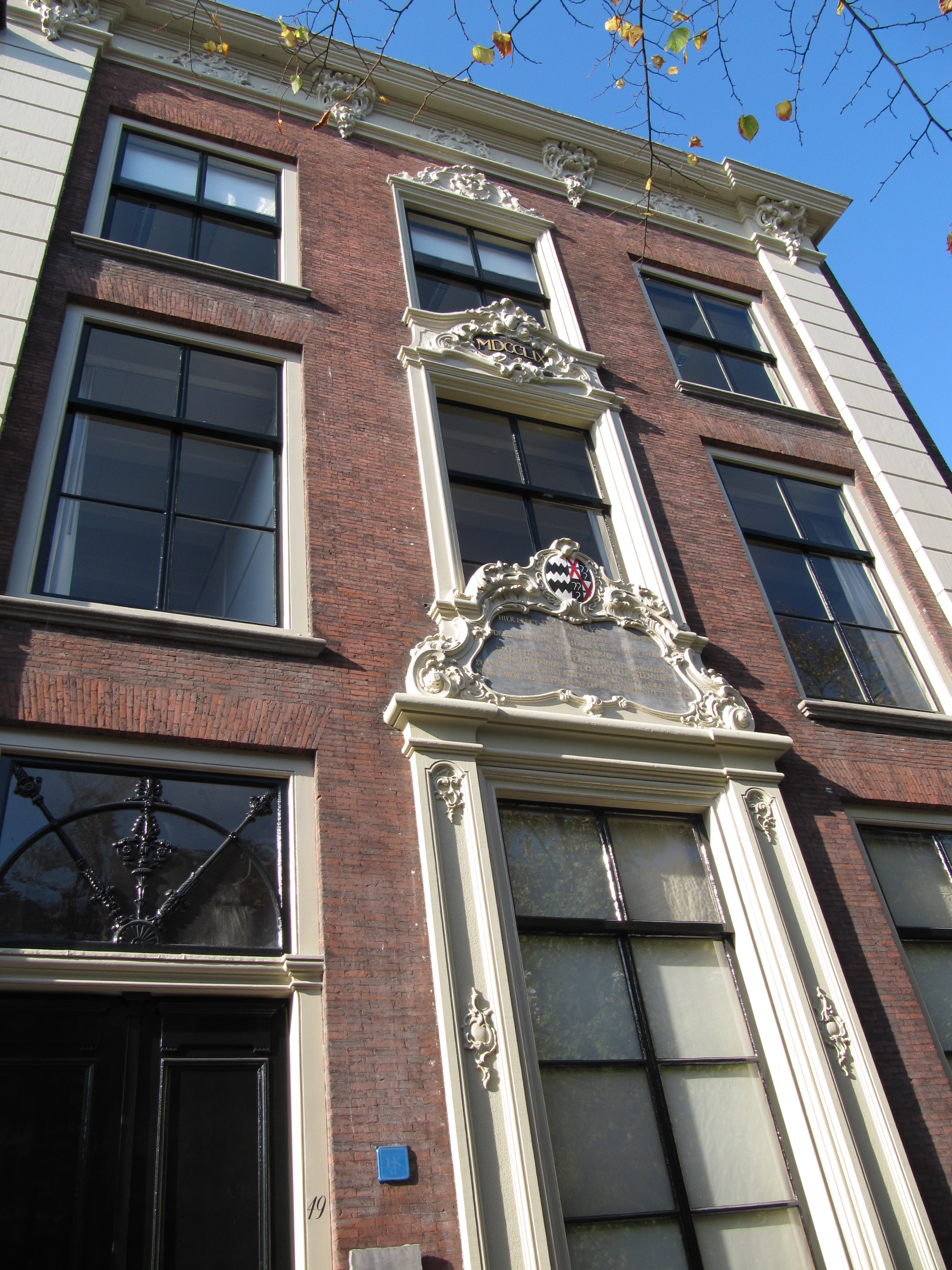
Fundatiehuis Delft

Maria Duyst van Voorhout (1662 in Delft – 1754 in Utrecht), was a 17th-century heiress who lived to into her 90s and used her inheritance to start the Fundatie van Renswoude in three cities, Delft, Utrecht, and The Hague.

== Biography ==
Maria was the daughter of a mayor of Delft and came from a long line of Delft beer brewers. Her parents died when she was young and she married at nineteen to a magistrate of Leiden, Dirk van Hogeveen, who died two years later. Against the wishes of her wealthy grandmother, she remarried Frederik Adriaan Reede van Renswoude, a nobleman who carried the title "Heer van Renswoude", but who led an expensive lifestyle and who had many debts. The couple had a daughter who died in infancy. In 1686 Maria's grandmother died and she inherited her fortune, but could only gain access to the funds after her husband died. Maria had already enough money of her own however without her grandmother's money, even though she lent large sums to her husband, and she lived on the Lange Voorhout in the Hague and was a member of the "De Haegsche Sociteyt" and was friends with Anthonie van Leeuwenhoek.

In 1730 she and her husband moved to Utrecht after he was involved in a scandal about homosexuality. Because he was a nobleman in Renswoude and above the law there, he escaped imprisonment or hanging. After the public outcry subsided he could visit his wife in Utrecht, but he never returned to The Hague. In 1738 Frederik died and Maria was given control of her grandmother's money. In 1749 she made up her testament as lady of Renswoude en Emmickhuysen and declared that her fortune should be divided into thirds and spent on the technical education of poor young boys in the cities of Utrecht, The Hague, and Delft. The boys would be the smartest of the orphanages Stads Ambachtskinderhuis (in Utrecht), the Weeshuis der Gereformeerden (in Delft) and the Burgerweeshuis of The Hague.

After she died in 1754, her testament was contested by distant family members, but those rights were settled and in 1756 three foundations were created according to her wishes and were each called the Fundatie van Renswoude in all three cities. These schools operated according to her vision until the 19th century, when they suffered from the Tiercering and due to lack of funds became boarding addresses associated with public day schools. In this capacity they continued to operate into the 20th century, but now all three are closed.
