= Beelaerts van Blokland =

Patrician family (Dutch)

- noble & patrician family
- Country: Netherlands
- Founder: Zegher Lycop

Beelaerts van Blokland is an old Dutch patrician family.

== History ==
The family came originally from the Dutch town Oirschot. The oldest recorded member is a one Zeger Lycop who lived in the 14th century. His grandson Henric was the first to carry the name Beelaerts. The family belongs to the Dutch nobility since 1815 with the honorific of jonkheer.

== Famous members ==
- Gerard Jacob Theodoor Beelaerts van Blokland (1843–1897), Speaker of the Dutch House of Representatives and envoy for the South African Republic
- Frans Beelaerts van Blokland (1872–1956), Dutch envoy to China, Minister of Foreign Affairs, Vice-President of the Council of State
- Pieter Beelaerts van Blokland (1932–2021), Minister of Housing, Spatial Planning and the Environment, Mayor, Queen's Commissioner of the Province of Utrecht

== Bibliography ==
- Nederland's Patriciaat 58 (1972), pp. 15–39.
- Nederland's Adelsboek 79 (1988), pp. 289–329.

== References and sources ==
- Hoge Raad van Adel
- Handboek der Wapenkunde, Rietstap, J.B. (1857)
