= Hans Gruijters =

Dutch politician (1931–2005)

His Excellency Hans Gruijters
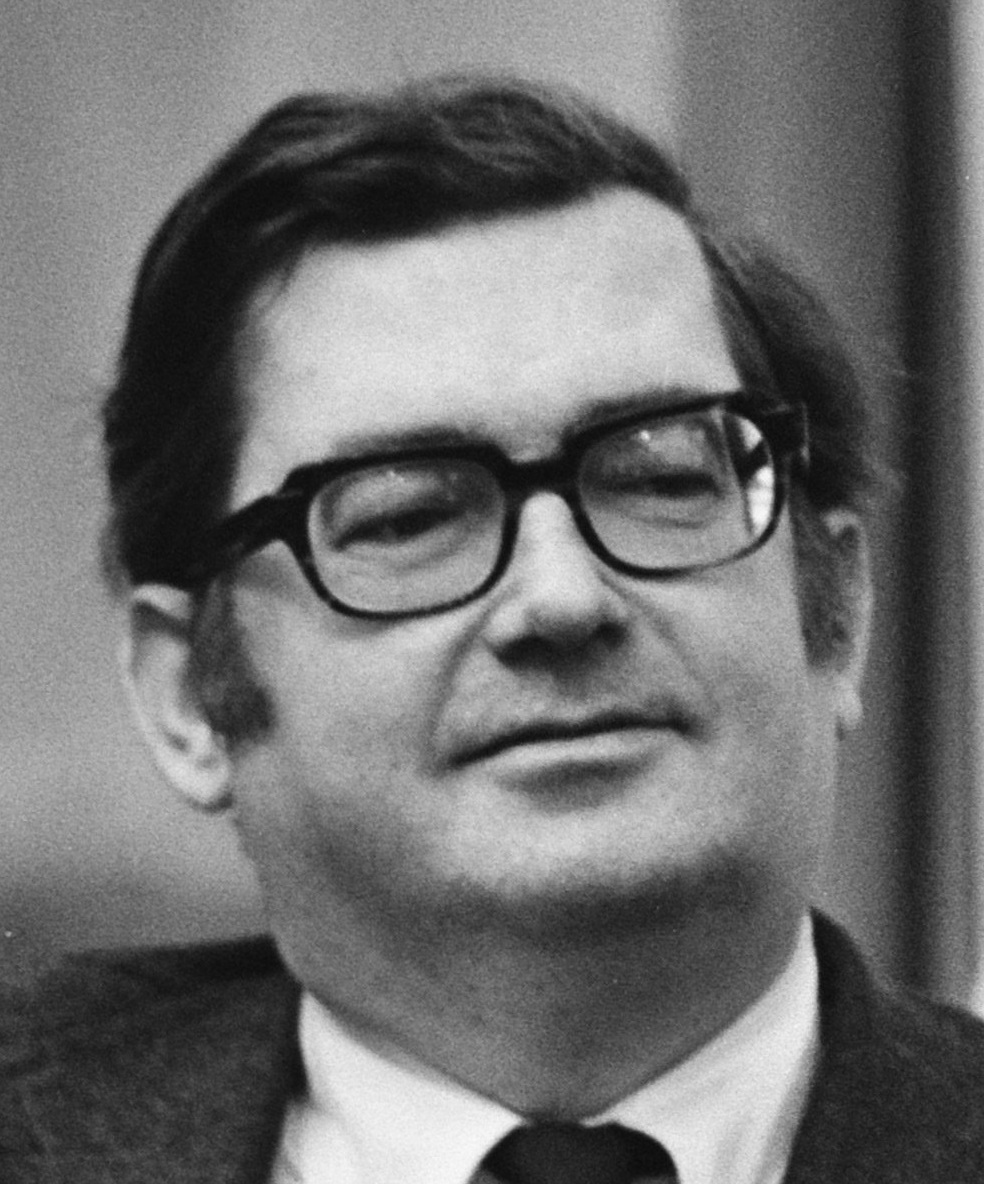
- Gruijters in 1975

Mayor of Lelystad
- In office 1 January 1980 – 1 July 1996
- Preceded by: Office established
- Succeeded by: Chris Leeuwe

Minister of Housing and Spatial Planning
- In office 11 May 1973 – 19 December 1977
- Prime Minister: Joop den Uyl
- Preceded by: Bé Udink
- Succeeded by: Pieter Beelaerts van Blokland

Member of the House of Representatives
- In office 7 December 1972 – 11 May 1973

Personal details
- Born: Johannes Petrus Adrianus Gruijters; 30 June 1931 Helmond, Netherlands
- Died: 17 April 2005 (aged 73) Lelystad, Netherlands
- Party: Democrats 66 (1966–2004)
- Other political affiliations: People's Party for Freedom and Democracy (1952–1966)
- Spouse: Jannetje Mol (m. 1960)
- Children: 1 son
- Education: University of Amsterdam (Bachelor of Social Science, Master of Social Science)
- Occupation: Politician; journalist; businessman; editor; author

Johannes Petrus Adrianus "Hans" Gruijters (Dutch pronunciation: [ɦɑns ˈxrœytərs]; (Note: Gruijters in isolation: [ˈɣrœytərs].) 30 June 1931 – 17 April 2005) was a Dutch politician and co-founder of the Democrats 66 (D66) party and journalist.

== Biography ==
Hans Gruijters studied psychology and political and social sciences at the University of Amsterdam. In 1954 he received a master's degree in psychology. After that he became the executive secretary with a textile company in Helmond. Later he was a joint proprietor of various companies in hotel and catering industry in Amsterdam. From 1960 to 1967 he ran the foreign affairs section of the Dutch daily newspaper Algemeen Handelsblad. From 1971 to 1973 he was the main editor of the VNU, a Dutch media conglomerate.

As a politician Gruijters was an active member of the People's Party for Freedom and Democracy (VVD). As of 1959 he acted as the chairman of the Amsterdam's Youth Organisation Freedom and Democracy. From November 1962 until 21 March 1966 he was VVD's representative in the Amsterdam's municipal council. After a conflict which had been provoked by his decision not to attend the wedding ceremony of Princess Beatrix and Claus von Amsberg he left the VVD. He thought that the marriage would not contribute to the social role that the royal house should play in society.

Together with Hans van Mierlo he founded the Democrats 66 (D66) in 1966. From 7 July 1970 to 1971 he was a member of the Provincial Council of North Holland. As of 7 December 1972 until 11 May 1973 he was a member of the House of Representatives. From 11 May 1973 until 19 December 1977 he was a minister of public housing and environmental planning in the Den Uyl cabinet. From 1980 until his retirement in 1996 he was mayor of Lelystad. In 2004 he left the D66 as he felt no longer to be welcome there.

== Notes ==
Political offices
Preceded by Bé Udink	Minister of Housing and Spatial Planning; 1973–1977	Succeeded by Pieter Beelaerts van Blokland
New title	Mayor of Lelystad; 1980–1996	Succeeded by Chris Leeuwe
