= Werner Buck =

Dutch politician (1925-2010)

State Secretary for Housing and Spatial Planning
- In office 17 August 1971 – 11 May 1973
- Prime Minister: Barend Biesheuvel
- Minister: Bé Udink
- Preceded by: Position established
- Succeeded by: Jan Schaefer

Personal details
- Born: Karel Werner Buck; 19 July 1925 Kerkrade, Netherlands
- Died: 9 October 2010 (aged 85) Maastricht, Netherlands
- Party: Christian Democratic Appeal (from 1980)
- Other political affiliations: Catholic People's Party (1958–1980)
- Occupation: Administrator, politician

Karel Werner Buck (19 July 1925 – 9 October 2010) was a Dutch politician of the defunct Catholic People's Party (KVP) party and later the Christian Democratic Appeal (CDA) party.

Political offices
Preceded by Position established	State Secretary for Housing and Spatial Planning; 1971–1973	Succeeded by Jan Schaefer
