= Erwin Nypels =

Dutch politician (1933–2024)

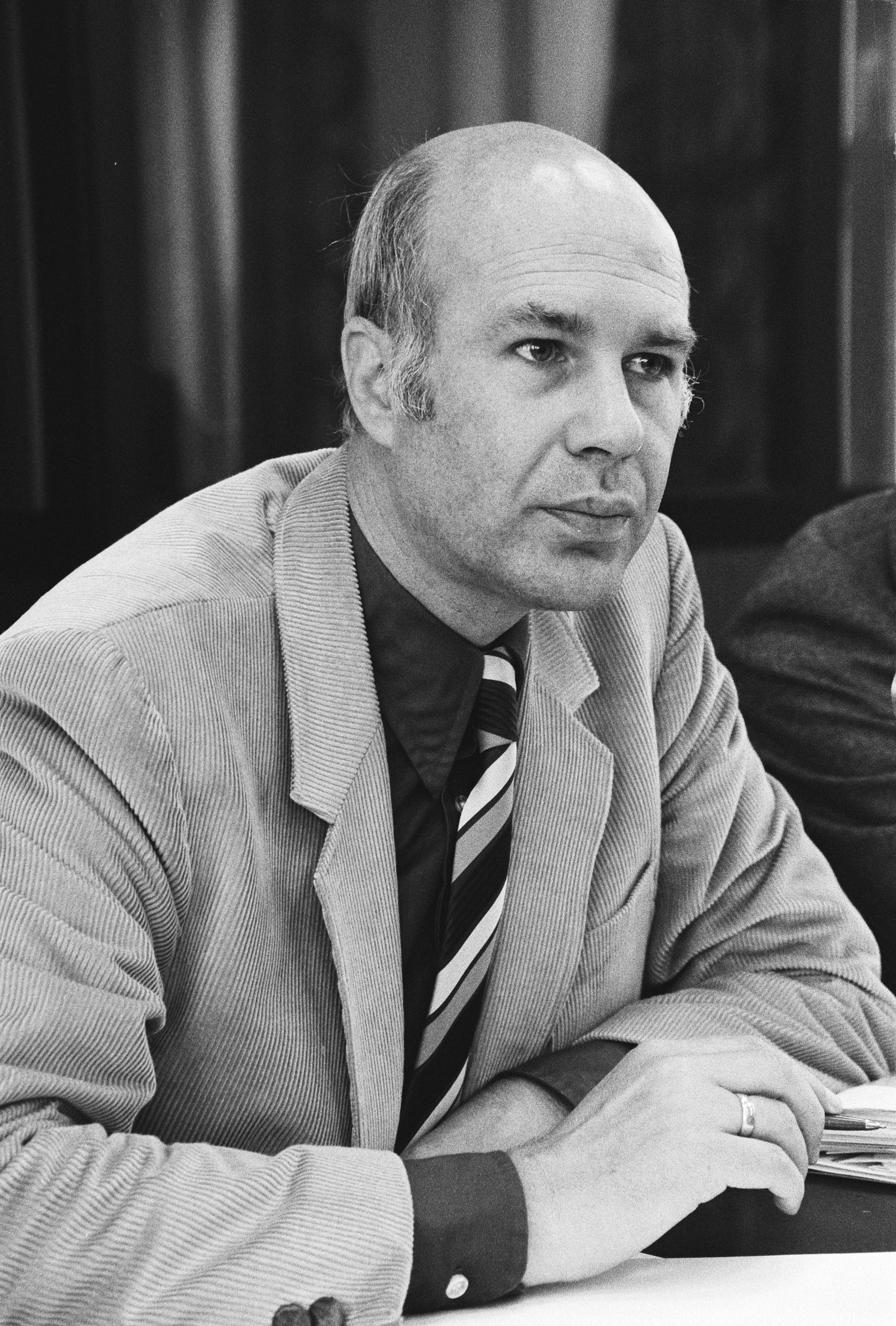
- Nypels in 1980
- Born: Erwin Nypels; 1 August 1933; Bloemendaal, Netherlands
- Died: 8 December 2024 (aged 91); Rijswijk, Netherlands

Erwin Nypels (1 August 1933 – 8 December 2024) was a Dutch politician.

== Life and career ==
Nypels was born in Bloemendaal, North Holland. With a background in the field of public housing and pensions, he worked for years for a settlement of the pensions, and so came with an initiative. Nypels also brought a private member's bill through an arrangement of woningsplitsing established. He was Member of Parliament for D66. He was in 1967 business economist at the PTT and for two years chairman of the JOVD. After his political career, he was president of the union for senior staff.

Nypels died in Rijswijk on 8 December 2024, at the age of 91.
