= Albertus Cornelis Tuijnman =

Dutch statistician and analyst (1959–2024)

Albertus Cornelis Tuijnman (1959–2024), also known as Albert Tuijnman, was an academic, statistician and policy analyst whose work focused on comparative education, education finance, adult education, lifelong learning and the long-term effects of education across the life course. His research made influential contributions to understanding how adult education shapes occupational trajectories, earnings and well-being. He was widely regarded for advancing longitudinal and statistical methods in the study of education.

== Early life and education ==
Tuijnman was born in the Netherlands on 27 April 1959. He earned a Bachelor of Arts in Teacher Education from Hogeschool Tilburg in 1982, a Certificate in Development Studies from the University of Oslo in 1984, and both a Master of Arts (1987) and a Ph.D. (1989) from Stockholm University. In 1994, he received a Habilitation from the Faculty of Social Sciences at Stockholm University.

== Scientific contribution ==
His doctoral dissertation, Recurrent Education, Earnings and Well-being: A Fifty-Year Longitudinal Study of a Cohort of Swedish Men, examined how initial schooling and subsequent adult education influenced occupational status, earnings, job satisfaction and well-being over five decades. The study followed men born in 1928 from childhood to late adulthood and demonstrated that adult education had measurable effects on occupational outcomes and self-reported well-being. Its methodological significance has been noted in subsequent research.

Tuijnman continued to publish extensively on adult education, education economics, and lifelong learning, and he served as editor of the International Encyclopedia of Adult Education and Training.

== Career ==
In 1992 Tuijnman was recruited by the OECD, where he worked as Principal Administrator in the Education and Training Division until 1998. He was the main OECD contact for the International Adult Literacy Survey (IALS), launched in 1994, and was lead author of the first three editions of Education at a Glance.

After leaving the OECD in 1998 he became Professor and Director of the Institute of International Education at Stockholm University. Later he served as Managerial Advisor in the Education and Public Research Division at the European Investment Bank, where he worked on educational investment programmes.

Tuijnman contributed expert commentary to international policy discussions, including work for the Government of Sweden on education, skills, and economic development.

== Recognition ==
Tuijnman held honorary professorships at the University of Nottingham, the Danish University of Education, and the University of Hong Kong. He was an elected Fellow of the International Academy of Education and served on the editorial boards of several academic journals, including the International Review of Education, the International Journal of Lifelong Education, and the European Journal of Education.

In 2024, he was posthumously inducted into the International Adult and Continuing Education Hall of Fame.

== Death ==
Albert Tuijnman died on 30 July 2024.

== Selected works ==
- Tuijnman, A.C. (1989). Recurrent Education, Earnings, and Well-being: A Fifty-Year Longitudinal Study of a Cohort of Swedish Men. Stockholm: Almqvist & Wiksell International.
- Tuijnman, A.C. (1990). "Adult Education and the Quality of Life." International Review of Education, 36(3), 283–298.
- Tuijnman, A.C. (1991). "Lifelong Education: A Test of the Accumulation Hypothesis." International Journal of Lifelong Education, 10(4), 275–285.
- Tomlinson, T.M., & Tuijnman, A.C. (eds.) (1994). Educational Research and Reform: An International Perspective. Washington, DC: U.S. Government Printing Office.
- Tuijnman, A.C. (1996). The International Encyclopedia of Adult Education and Training. Oxford: Pergamon Press.
- Tuijnman, A.C. (1996). Lifelong Learning for All. Paris: OECD.
- Bélanger, P., & Tuijnman, A.C. (eds.) (1997). New Patterns of Adult Learning: A Six-Country Comparative Study. Oxford: Pergamon Press.
- Tuijnman, A.C. (ed.) (1997). Literacy Skills for the Knowledge Society. Paris: OECD.
- Tuijnman, A.C., & Boudard, E. (2001). Adult Education Participation in North America. Washington, DC: U.S. Department of Education; Ottawa: HRDC.
- Tuijnman, A.C., & Hellström, Z. (2001). Curious Minds: Nordic Adult Education Compared. Copenhagen: Nordic Council of Ministers.
- Jenkins, A., & Wiggins, R.D. (1995). "Pathways from Adult Education to Well-being: The Tuijnman Model Revisited." International Review of Education, 61, 79–97.
