= Dirk Rijnders =

Dutch politician

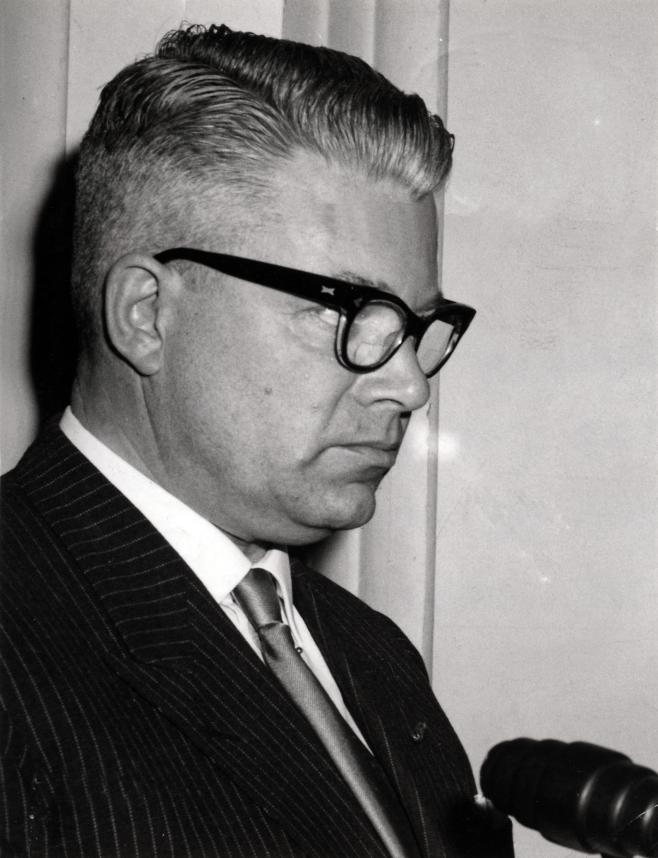
Dirk Rijnders

Dirk Rijnders (born 8 March 1909 in Harderwijk, Gelderland – died 7 November 2006 in Eindhoven) was a Dutch politician of the Christian Historical Union (CHU) and its successor the Christian Democratic Appeal (CDA).

Rijnders was mayor of several municipalities, among others Amstelveen. He was also a member of the States of North Holland and the Senate.
