= Elisabeth Tuijnman =

Dutch politician

1st Mayor of Overbetuwe
- Incumbent
- Assumed office 2001

Mayor of Papendrecht
- In office 1996–2001

Mayor of Norg
- In office 1985–1996

Personal details
- Party: People's Party for Freedom and Democracy
- Website: www.overbetuwe.nl

Elisabeth 'Liesbeth' Tuijnman is the current mayor of the municipality of Overbetuwe in the Netherlands. She obtained the equivalent of a bachelor's degree in education. Before becoming mayor of Overbetuwe, she had served as mayor to the rural community of Norg, Papendrecht and Sandebuur. Mayor Tuijnman is a member of the liberal conservative People's Party for Freedom and Democracy.
