= Boele Staal =

Dutch politician

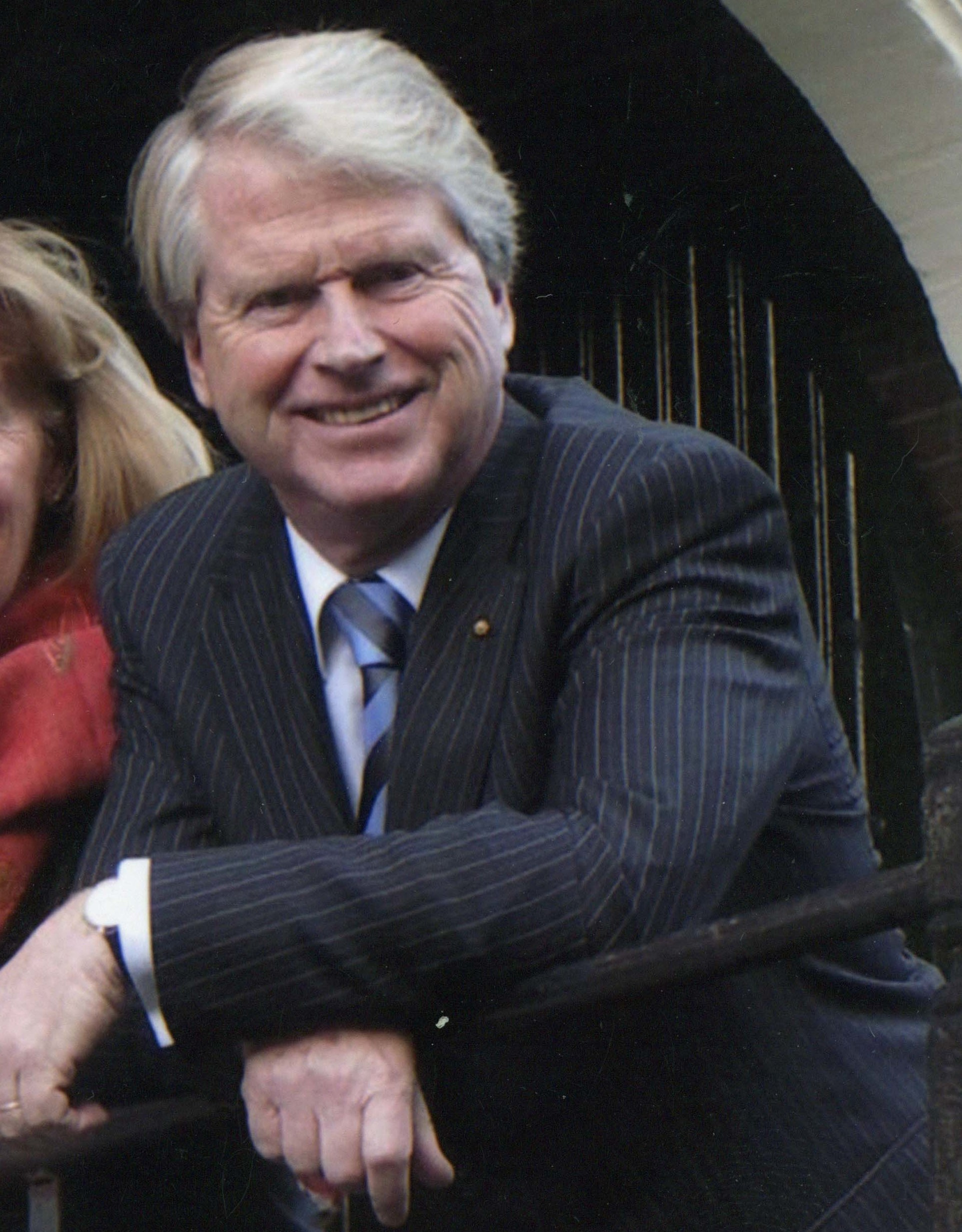
Boele Staal (ca. 2000)

Boele Staal (born 18 December 1947) is a Dutch politician of the Democrats 66 party.

Staal, a native of Apeldoorn, served as the Queen's Commissioner of Utrecht from 1998 to 2007, and as a Senator from 1991 to 1998 and again between 2010 and 2011. He also was the ad interim Mayor of Arnhem from October 2016 to August 2017, until the instalment of Ahmed Marcouch on 1 September 2017. Starting from December 2017 for half a year he was the Acting King's Commissioner of Overijssel.

He graduated from the University of Groningen and later from the University of Utrecht, before becoming a police officer in Almere.
