= Second Van Agt cabinet =

Dutch government cabinet, 1981 to 1982

- Cabinet of the Netherlands

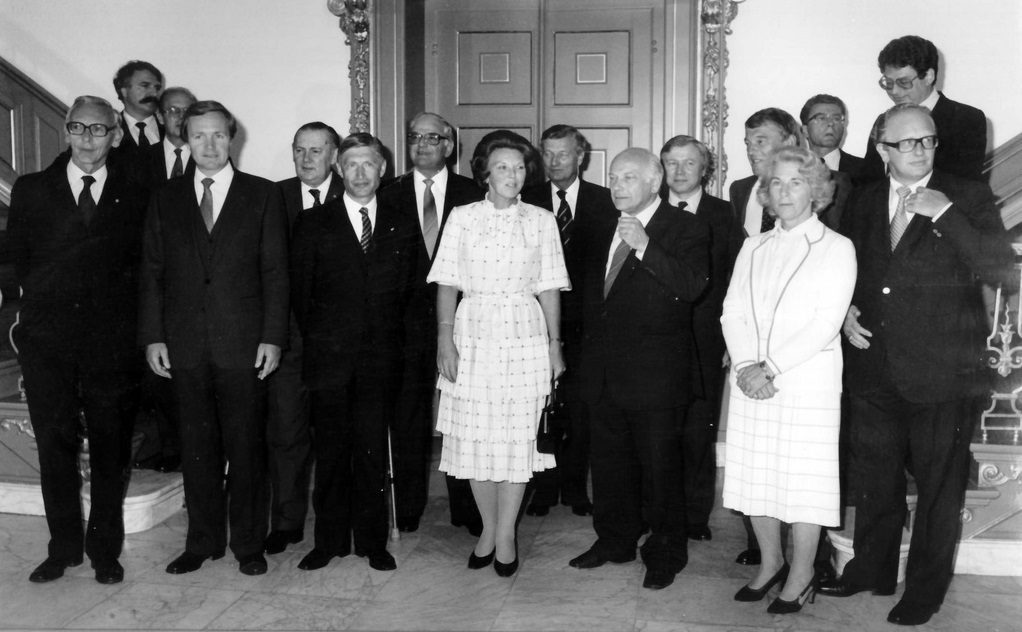
- The installation of the Second Van Agt cabinet on 11 September 1981
- Date formed: 11 September 1981
- Date dissolved: 29 May 1982; 260 days in office (demissionary from 12 May 1982)

People and organisations
- Monarch: Queen Beatrix
- Prime Minister: Dries van Agt
- Deputy Prime Minister: Joop den Uyl; Jan Terlouw
- No. of ministers: 16
- Member party: Christian Democratic Appeal (CDA); Labour Party (PvdA); Democrats 66 (D'66)
- Status in legislature: Centre-left; Majority government (Grand coalition)

History
- Incoming formation: 1981 formation
- Outgoing formation: 1982 formation
- Election: 1981 election
- Outgoing election: 1982 election
- Legislature terms: 1981–1982
- Predecessor: First Van Agt cabinet
- Successor: Third Van Agt cabinet

The second Van Agt cabinet was the executive branch of the Dutch government from 11 September 1981 until 29 May 1982. The cabinet comprised members of the Christian-democratic party Christian Democratic Appeal (CDA), the social-democratic Labour Party (PvdA) and the social-liberal party Democrats 66 (D'66) after the election of 1981. The cabinet was a centre-left grand coalition and had a substantial majority in the House of Representatives. The Leader of the Christian Democratic Appeal, Dries van Agt, served as Prime Minister. Former Prime Minister Joop den Uyl, the Labour leader, served as Deputy Prime Minister and Minister of Social Affairs and Employment, and was also given the portfolio of Netherlands Antilles Affairs. Democrats 66's leader Jan Terlouw served as Deputy Prime Minister and Minister of Economic Affairs.

The cabinet served in the early years of the turbulent 1980s. Domestically it had to deal with a recession and growing inflation, but it was able to implement a major reform of social security during its brief tenure.

The cabinet suffered several major internal conflicts between its Christian Democratic Appeal members and Labour Party members, especially a poor working relationship between Prime Minister Van Agt and Deputy Prime Minister Den Uyl. These led to the fall of the cabinet just 243 days into its term, on 12 May 1982; the Labour Party cabinet members resigned, and the cabinet was replaced on 29 May by the Third Van Agt cabinet in a caretaker role.

== Formation ==
Composition of the cabinet in relation to the rest of the legislature

At the 1981 general election the Christian Democratic Appeal (CDA), led by incumbent Prime Minister Dries van Agt, lost one seat but ended up with 48 seats, the greatest number of any party. The Labour Party (PvdA), led by former Prime Minister Joop den Uyl, lost nine seats, ending up with 44. Democrats 66 (D'66), led by Jan Terlouw, gained the most, adding nine new seats, for a total of 17. A long negotiation between CDA, PvdA and D'66 followed. The negotiation was troubled by personal animosity between leader of CDA Dries van Agt and leader of PvdA Joop den Uyl. The two men had previously, as (respectively) Deputy Prime Minister and Prime Minister, had a bad working relationship during the Den Uyl cabinet (1973–1977). In the end a coalition was formed.

== Term ==
Many conflicts made a healthy coalition impossible. Den Uyl, as Minister of Social Affairs, tried to create employment; but a plan to reform health insurance was met with huge resistance from the left wing. The cabinet fell because the Christian Democrats wanted a cut in government spending, while the Labour Party opposed this.

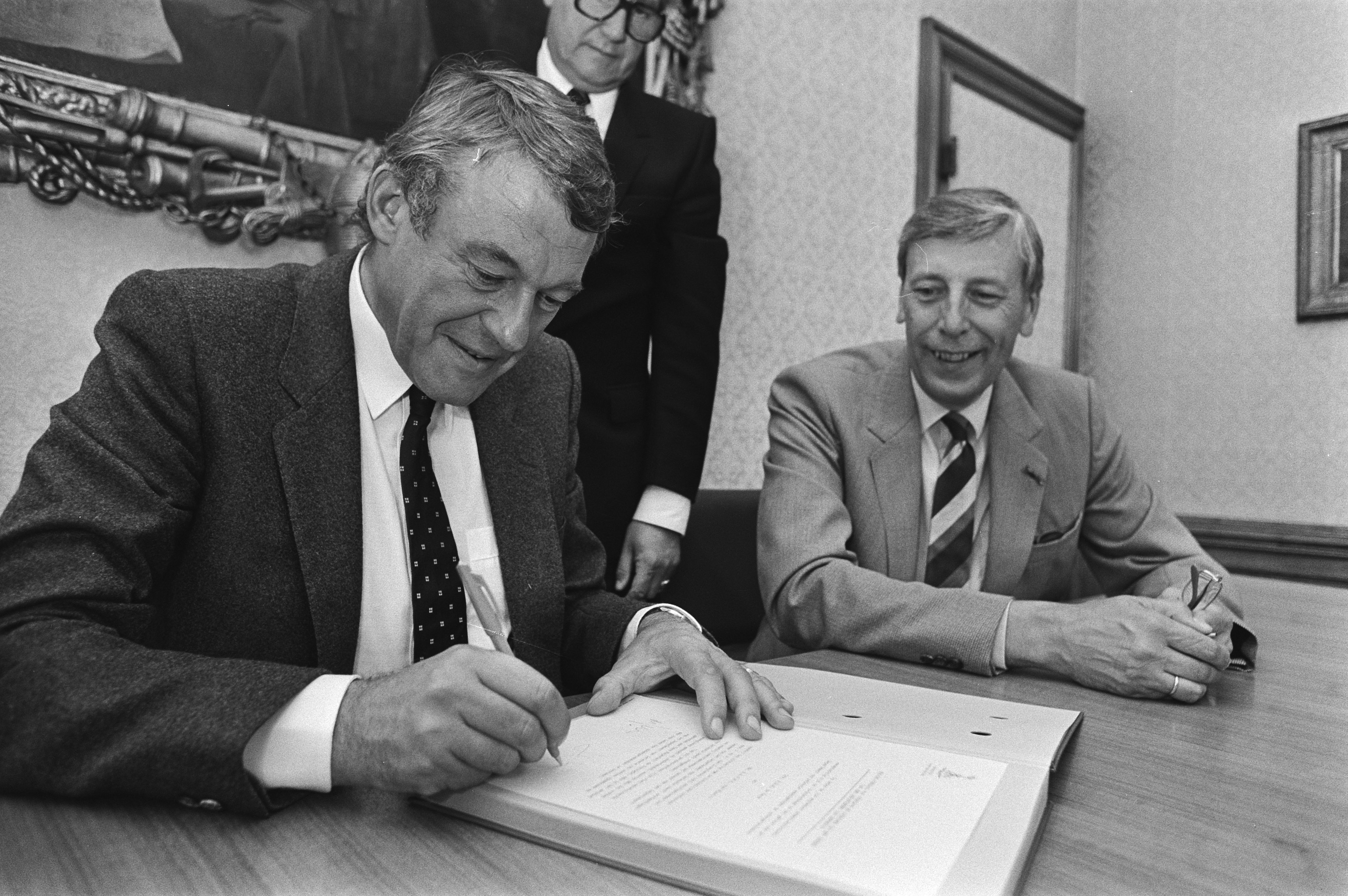
Incoming Minister of Defence Hans van Mierlo and departing Minister of Defence Pieter de Geus at the Ministry of Defence on 11 September 1981

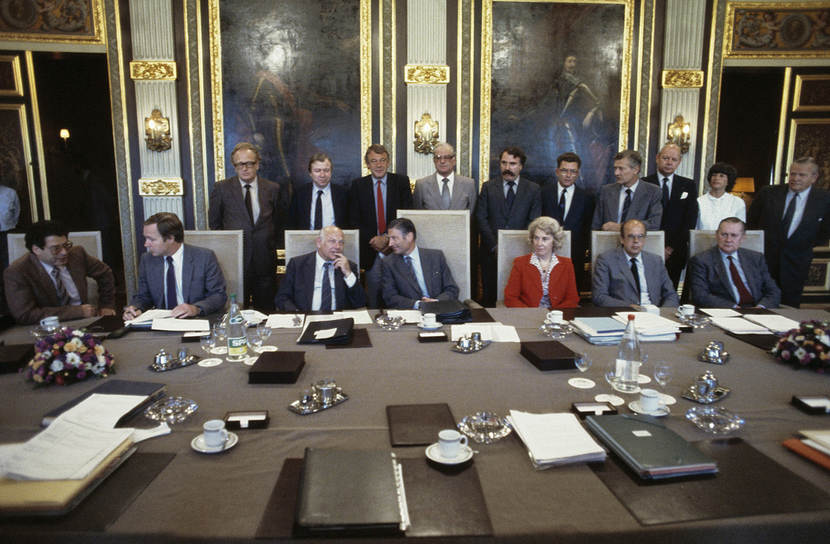
The first meeting the Second Van Agt cabinet at the Ministry of General Affairs on 11 September 1981

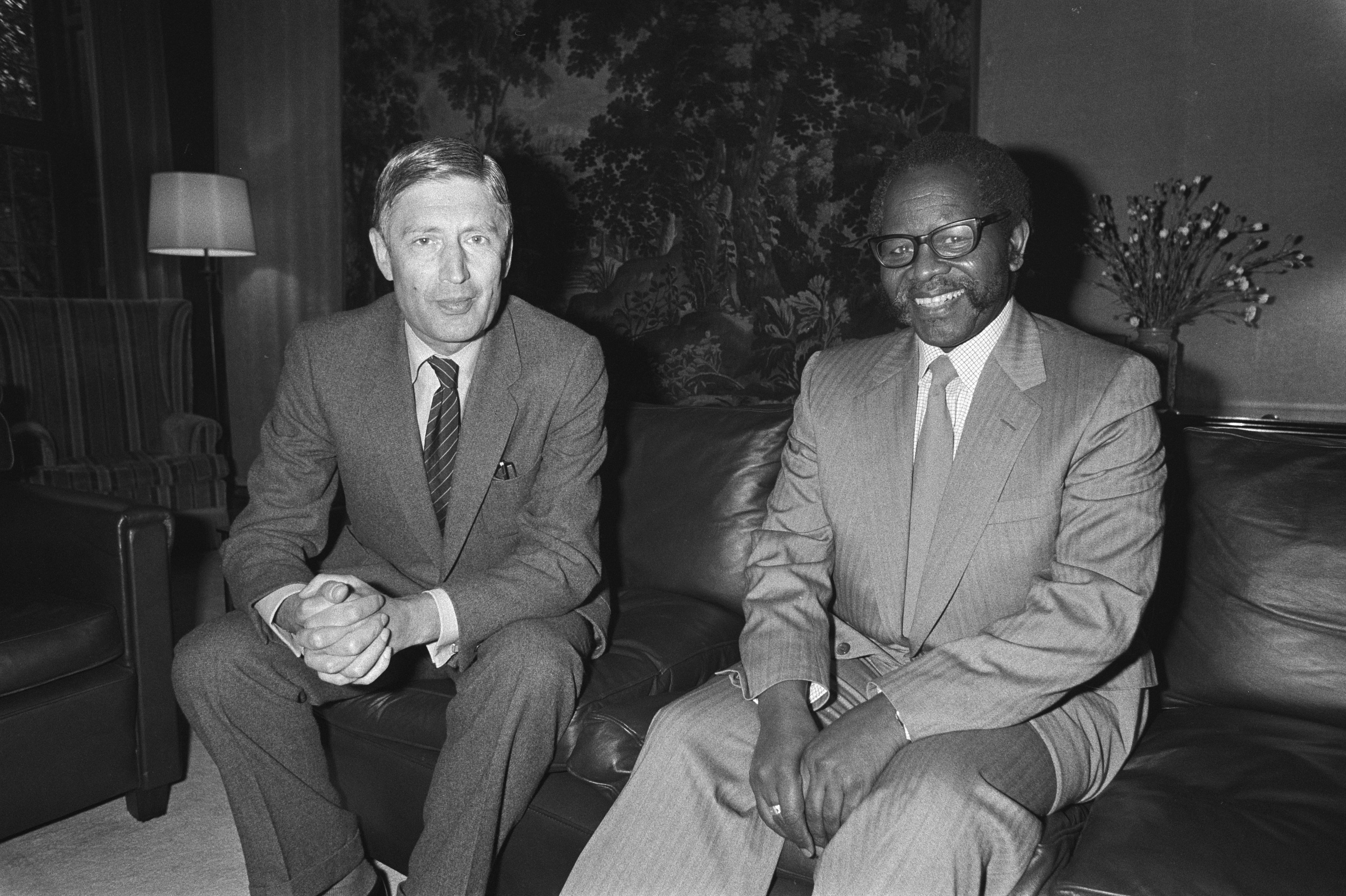
Prime Minister Dries van Agt and South African anti-apartheid activist Oliver Tambo at the Catshuis on 19 October 1981

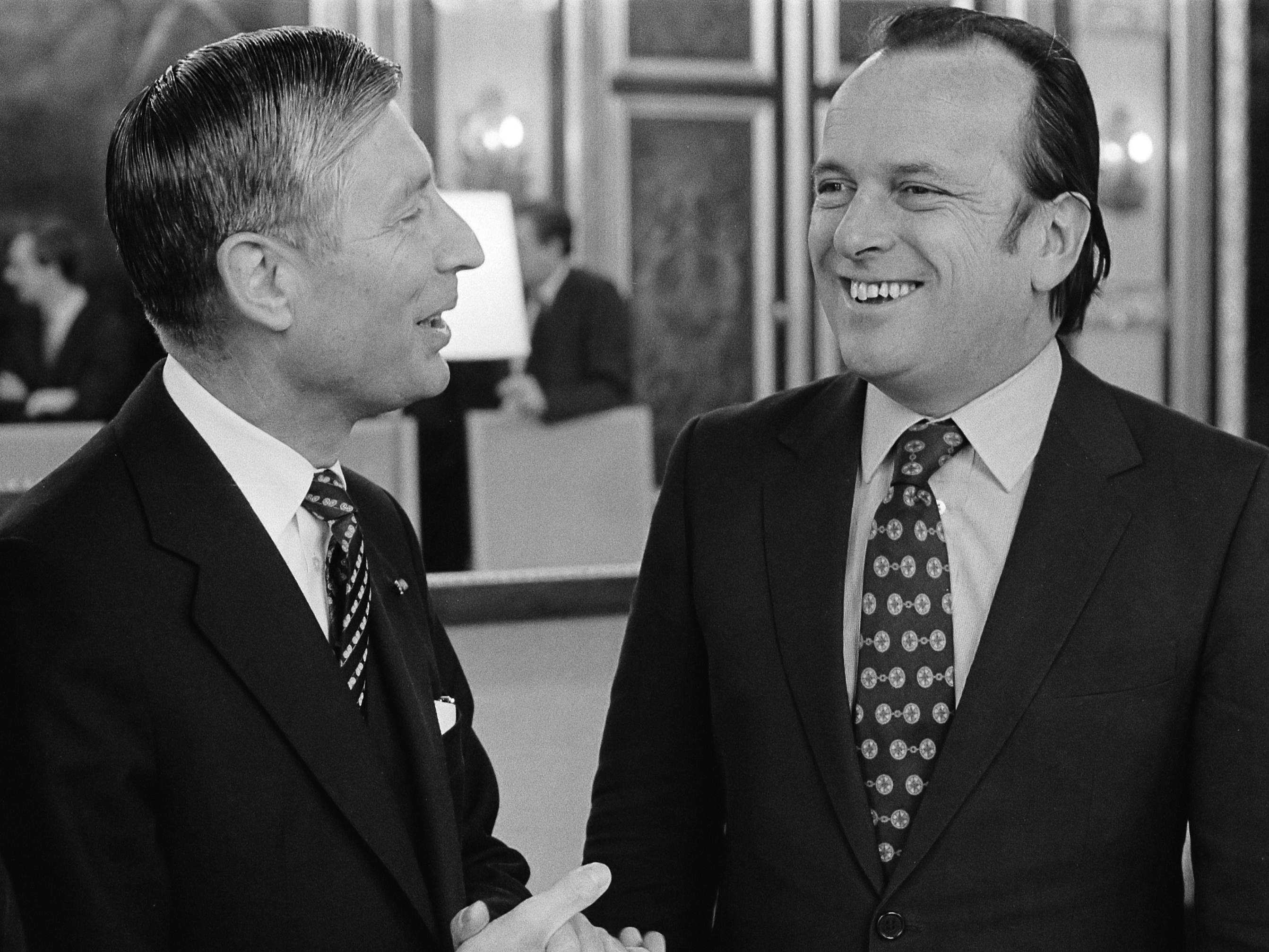
Prime Minister Dries van Agt and Prime Minister of Portugal Francisco Pinto Balsemão at the Ministry of General Affairs on 25 February 1982

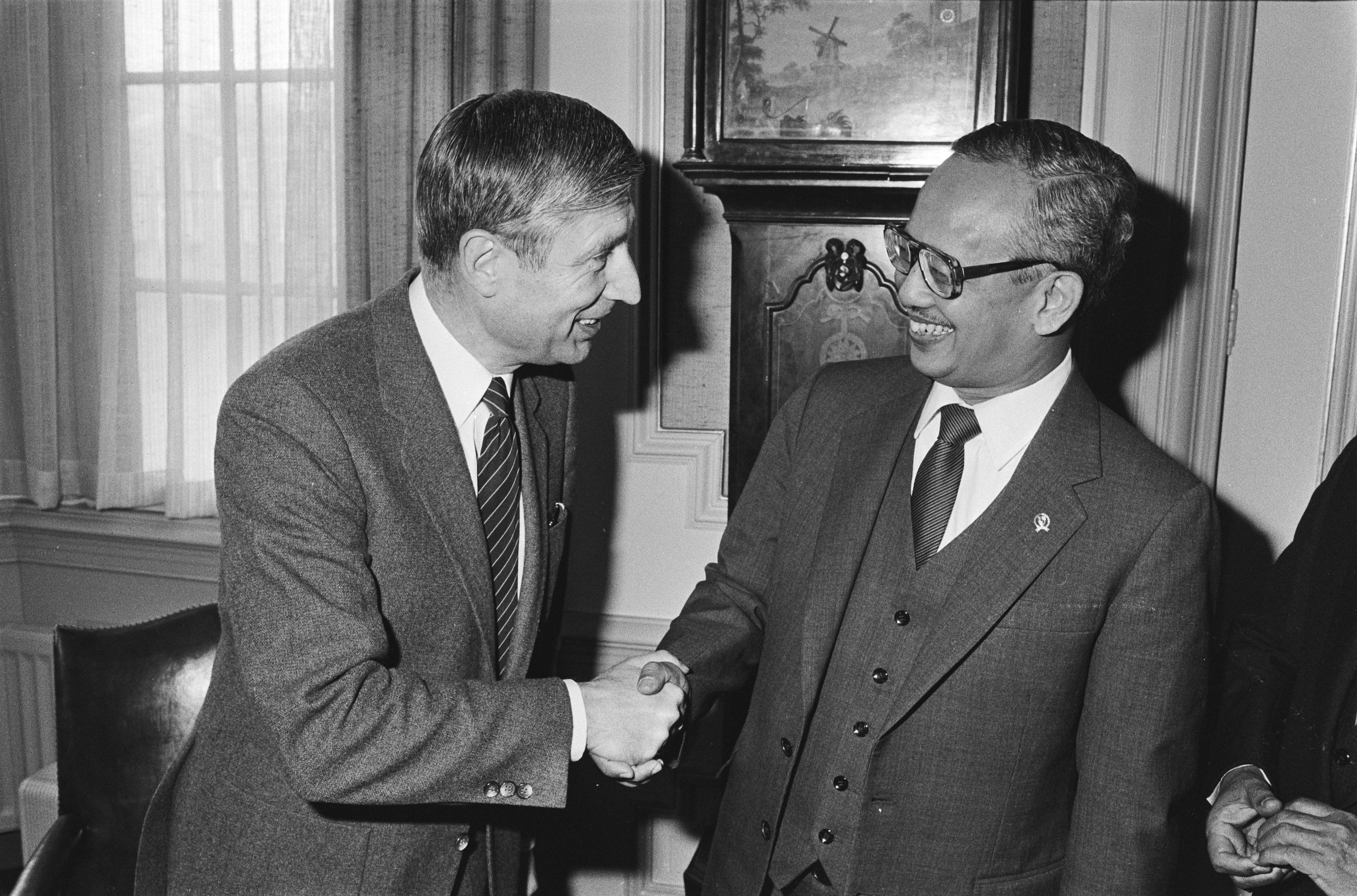
Prime Minister Dries van Agt and Indonesian Minister of Foreign Affairs Mochtar Kusumaatmadja at the Ministry of General Affairs on 4 March 1982

== Cabinet members ==
Ministers		Title/Ministry/Portfolio(s)			Term of office	Party
Dries van Agt	Dries van Agt (1931–2024)	Prime Minister	General Affairs		19 December 1977 – 4 November 1982^{[Retained]} ^{[Continued]}	Christian; Democratic Appeal
Joop den Uyl	Joop den Uyl (1919–1987)	Deputy; Prime Minister	Social Affairs and Employment		11 September 1981 – 29 May 1982^{[Res]}	Labour Party
Joop den Uyl	Joop den Uyl (1919–1987)	Minister	Social Affairs and Employment		11 September 1981 – 29 May 1982^{[Res]}	Labour Party
Joop den Uyl	Joop den Uyl (1919–1987)	Minister	Interior	• Netherlands; Antilles	11 September 1981 – 29 May 1982^{[Res]}	Labour Party
Jan Terlouw	Jan Terlouw (1931–2025)	Deputy; Prime Minister	Economic Affairs		11 September 1981 – 4 November 1982^{[Continued]}	Democrats 66
Jan Terlouw	Jan Terlouw (1931–2025)	Minister	Economic Affairs		11 September 1981 – 4 November 1982^{[Continued]}	Democrats 66
Ed van Thijn	Ed van Thijn (1934–2021)	Minister	Interior		11 September 1981 – 29 May 1982^{[Res]}	Labour Party
Max van der Stoel	Max van der Stoel (1924–2011)	Minister	Foreign Affairs		11 September 1981 – 29 May 1982^{[Res]}	Labour Party
Fons van der Stee	Fons van der Stee (1928–1999)	Minister	Finance		5 March 1980 – 4 November 1982^{[Retained]} ^{[Continued]}	Christian; Democratic Appeal
Job de Ruiter	Job de Ruiter (1930–2015)	Minister	Justice		19 December 1977 – 4 November 1982^{[Retained]} ^{[Continued]}	Christian; Democratic Appeal
Hans van Mierlo	Hans van Mierlo (1931–2010)	Minister	Defence		11 September 1981 – 4 November 1982^{[Continued]}	Democrats 66
Til Gardeniers-Berendsen	Til Gardeniers- Berendsen (1925–2019)	Minister	Health and Environment		11 September 1981 – 4 November 1982^{[Continued]}	Christian; Democratic Appeal
Jos van Kemenade	Jos van Kemenade (1937–2020)	Minister	Education and Sciences		11 September 1981 – 29 May 1982^{[Res]}	Labour Party
Henk Zeevalking	Henk Zeevalking (1922–2005)	Minister	Transport and Water Management		11 September 1981 – 4 November 1982^{[Continued]}	Democrats 66
Jan de Koning	Jan de Koning (1926–1994)	Minister	Agriculture and Fisheries		11 September 1981 – 4 November 1982^{[Continued]}	Christian; Democratic Appeal
Marcel van Dam	Marcel van Dam (born 1938)	Minister	Housing and Spatial Planning		11 September 1981 – 29 May 1982^{[Res]}	Labour Party
André van der Louw	André van der Louw (1933–2005)	Minister	Culture, Recreation and Social Work		11 September 1981 – 29 May 1982^{[Res]}	Labour Party
Minister without portfolio		Title/Ministry/Portfolio(s)			Term of office	Party
Kees van Dijk	Kees van Dijk (1931–2008)	Minister	Foreign Affairs	• Development; Cooperation	11 September 1981 – 4 November 1982^{[Continued]}	Christian; Democratic Appeal
State Secretaries		Title/Ministry/Portfolio(s)			Term of office	Party
Saskia Stuiveling	Saskia Stuiveling (1945–2017)	State Secretary	Interior	• Municipalities	11 September 1981 – 29 May 1982^{[Res]}	Labour Party
Gerard van Leijenhorst	Gerard van Leijenhorst (1928–2001)	State Secretary	Interior	• Emergency; Management • Minorities	11 September 1981 – 4 November 1982^{[Continued]}	Christian; Democratic Appeal
Hans van den Broek	Hans van den Broek (1936–2025)	State Secretary	Foreign Affairs	• European Union • Benelux	11 September 1981 – 4 November 1982^{[Continued]}	Christian; Democratic Appeal
Hans Kombrink	Hans Kombrink (born 1946)	State Secretary	Finance	• Fiscal Policy • Governmental; Budget	11 September 1981 – 29 May 1982^{[Res]}	Labour Party
Michiel Scheltema	Michiel; Scheltema (born 1939)	State Secretary	Justice)	• Immigration and Asylum • Civil Law • Youth Justice	11 September 1981 – 4 November 1982^{[Continued]}	Democrats 66
Piet van Zeil	Piet van Zeil (1927–2012)	State Secretary	Economic Affairs	• Small and Medium-sized; Businesses • Regional; Development • Consumer; Protection • Tourism	11 September 1981 – 22 June 1986^{[Continued]}	Christian; Democratic Appeal
Wim Dik	Wim Dik (1939–2022)	State Secretary	Economic Affairs	• Trade and Export	11 September 1981 – 4 November 1982^{[Continued]}	Democrats 66
Bram Stemerdink	Bram Stemerdink (born 1936)	State Secretary	Defence	• Equipment • Justice	11 September 1981 – 29 May 1982^{[Res]}	Labour Party
Jan van Houwelingen	Jan van Houwelingen (1939–2013)	State Secretary	Defence	• Human; Resources	14 September 1981 – 7 November 1989^{[Continued]}	Christian; Democratic Appeal
Ineke Lambers-Hacquebard	Ineke Lambers- Hacquebard (1946–2014)	State Secretary	Health and Environment	• Environmental; Policy • Food Policy	11 September 1981 – 4 November 1982^{[Continued]}	Democrats 66
Ien Dales	Ien Dales (1931–1994)	State Secretary	Social Affairs and Employment	• Social Security • Unemployment • Elderly Care • Disability Policy	11 September 1981 – 29 May 1982^{[Res]}	Labour Party
Hedy d'Ancona	Hedy d'Ancona (born 1937)	State Secretary	Social Affairs and Employment	• Occupational; Safety • Adult; Education • Equality • Emancipation	11 September 1981 – 29 May 1982^{[Res]}	Labour Party
Ad Hermes	Ad Hermes (1929–2002)	State Secretary	Education and Sciences	• Primary; Education	9 January 1978 – 4 November 1982^{[Retained]} ^{[Continued]}	Christian; Democratic Appeal
Wim Deetman	Wim Deetman (born 1945)	State Secretary	Education and Sciences	• Secondary; Education	11 September 1981 – 29 May 1982	Christian; Democratic Appeal
Jaap van der Doef	Jaap van der Doef (1934–2025)	State Secretary	Transport and Water Management	• Public; Transport • Aviation • Water; Management • Postal Service • Weather; Forecasting	11 September 1981 – 29 May 1982^{[Res]}	Labour Party
Siepie de Jong	Siepie de Jong (born 1940)	State Secretary	Housing and Spatial Planning	• Public Housing • Spatial Planning	11 September 1981 – 29 May 1982^{[Res]}	Labour Party
Hans de Boer	Hans de Boer (born 1937)	State Secretary	Culture, Recreation and Social Work	• Social Services • Nature • Culture • Art • Recreation	11 September 1981 – 29 May 1982	Christian; Democratic Appeal

^{Resigned}
^{Retained from the previous cabinet}
^{Continued in the next cabinet}

== Trivia ==
- Five cabinet members had previous experience as scholars and professors: Dries van Agt (Criminal Law and Procedure), Jan Terlouw (Nuclear Physics), Job de Ruiter (Civil Law), Jos van Kemenade (Education Sociology) and Michiel Scheltema (Constitutional and Administrative Law).
- Four cabinet members (later) served as Party Leaders and Lijsttrekkers: Dries van Agt (1976–1982) of the Christian Democratic Appeal, Joop den Uyl (1966–1986) of the Labour Party, Jan Terlouw (1973–1982) and Hans van Mierlo (1966–1973, 1986–1998) of the Democrats 66.
- Four cabinet members would later be granted the honorary title of Minister of State: Max van der Stoel (1991), Hans van Mierlo (1998), Jos van Kemenade (2002) and Hans van den Broek (2005).
- Twelve cabinet members (later) served as Mayor: Ed van Thijn (Amsterdam), Jos van Kemenade (Eindhoven), Henk Zeevalking (Utrecht and Rijswijk), André van der Louw (Rotterdam), Hans Kombrink (Zaanstad), Piet van Zeil (Heerlen), Jan van Houwelingen (Haarlemmermeer), Ien Dales (Nijmegen), Wim Deetman (The Hague), Jaap van der Doef (Vlissingen and Almere), Siepie de Jong (Leek) and Hans de Boer (Haarlemmermeer).
