= Hans de Boer =

Dutch politician (born 1937)

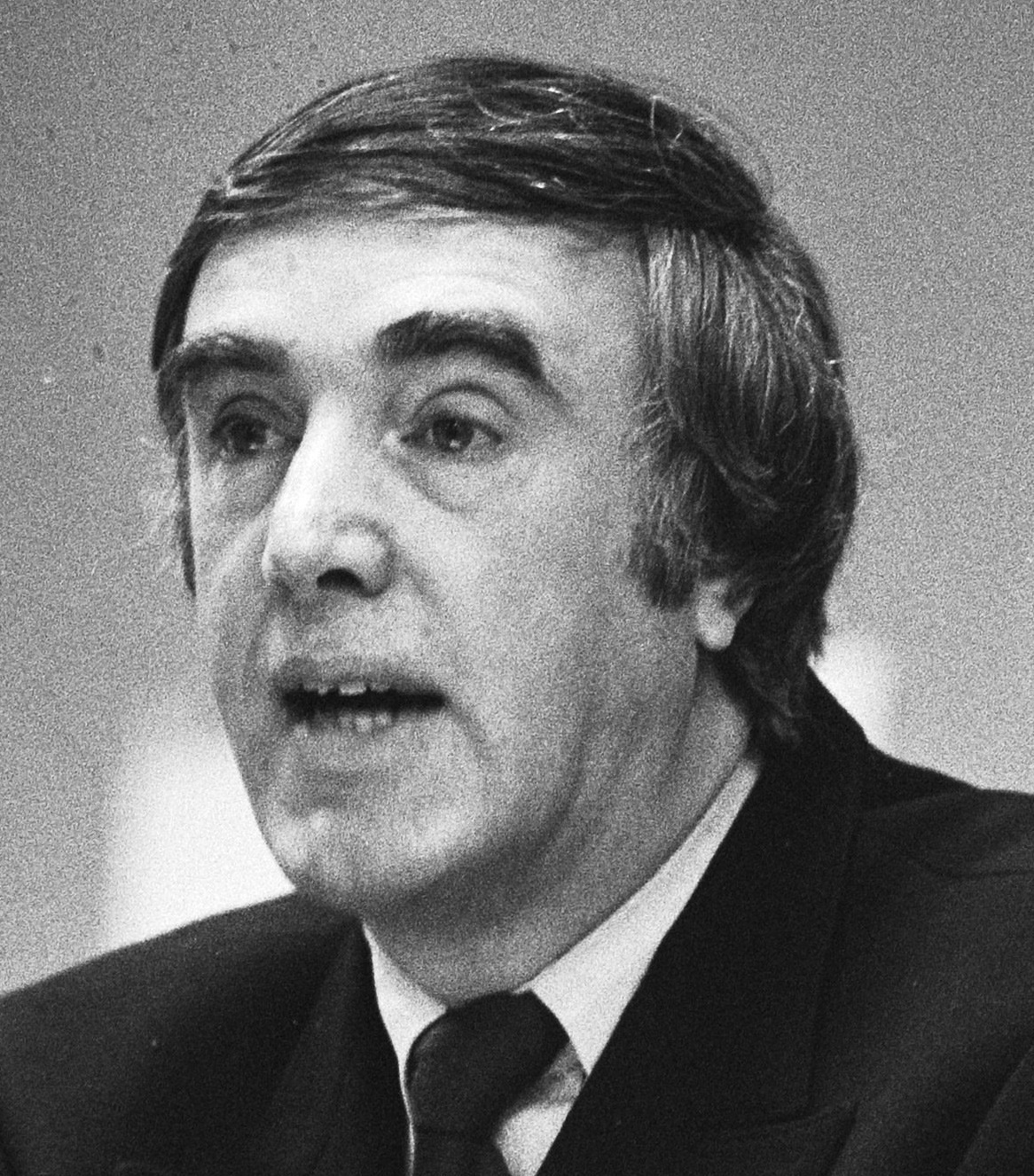
- Hans de Boer in 1979

Member of the Social and Economic Council
- In office 1 November 1995 – 1 January 2007
- Chair: See list: Theo Quené (1995–1996) Klaas de Vries (1996–1998) Herman Wijffels (1999–2006) Alexander Rinnooy Kan (2006–2007)

Mayor of Haarlemmermeer
- In office 13 March 1983 – 1 October 1985
- Preceded by: Cor van Stam
- Succeeded by: Aad van Dulst

Minister of Culture, Recreation and Social Work
- In office 29 May 1982 – 11 October 1982
- Prime Minister: Dries van Agt
- Preceded by: André van der Louw
- Succeeded by: Til Gardeniers-Berendsen (Ad interim)

State Secretary for Culture, Recreation and Social Work
- In office 11 September 1981 – 29 May 1982
- Prime Minister: Dries van Agt
- Preceded by: Jeltien Kraaijeveld-Wouters; Gerard Wallis de Vries
- Succeeded by: Office discontinued

Chairman of the Anti-Revolutionary Party
- In office 13 December 1975 – 27 September 1980
- Leader: Willem Aantjes
- Preceded by: Jan de Koning
- Succeeded by: Office discontinued

Member of the House of Representatives
- In office 16 September 1982 – 13 March 1983
- In office 16 February 1972 – 11 September 1981

Personal details
- Born: Hans Andries de Boer; 30 May 1937 (age 89) Velsen, Netherlands
- Party: Christian Democratic Appeal (from 1980)
- Other political affiliations: Anti-Revolutionary Party (until 1980)
- Children: 2 children
- Occupation: Politician · Civil servant · Businessman · Corporate director · Nonprofit director · Trade association executive · Lobbyist

Hans Andries de Boer (born 30 May 1937) is a former Dutch politician of the defunct Anti-Revolutionary Party (ARP) and later the Christian Democratic Appeal (CDA) party and trade association executive.

== Life ==
De Boer attended a Lyceum in Velsen from May 1949 until June 1955. De Boer worked as a farmworker in Velsen from May 1953 until July 1960. De Boer worked as a trade association executive for the Christian Farmers and Gardeners association (CBTB) from July 1960 until February 1972 and served as General-Secretary from August 1970 until February 1972. De Boer served on the Provincial Council of North Holland from June 1966 until February 1972 and served on the municipal council of Velsen from April 1971 until April 1974 and served as an Alderman in Velsen from September 1971 until September 1973.

De Boer became a member of the House of Representatives after the resignation of Joop Bakker, taking office on 16 February 1972 serving as a frontbencher chairing the special parliamentary committee for Gambling Reforms and the special parliamentary committee for Fishing Zones Establishments and spokesperson for small business, the civil service, fisheries, culture, media and military personnel. De Boer also served as Chairman of the Anti-Revolutionary Party from 13 December 1975 until 27 September 1980. After the 1977 general election, the Christian Democratic Appeal and the People's Party for Freedom and Democracy (VVD) formed the Van Agt–Wiegel cabinet. De Boer and several other CDA members of the House of Representatives were critical of the coalition agreement and formed an informal caucus in their own parliamentary group called the Loyalists that supported the cabinet only with confidence and supply.

After the 1981 general election, De Boer was appointed State Secretary for Culture, Recreation and Social Work in the Van Agt II cabinet, taking office on 11 September 1981. The cabinet fell just seven months into its term on 12 May 1982 after months of tensions in the coalition and continued to serve in a demissionary capacity until the first cabinet formation of 1982, when it was replaced by the caretaker Van Agt III cabinet, with De Boer appointed Minister of Culture, Recreation and Social Work, taking office on 29 May 1982. After the 1982 general election, De Boer returned to the House of Representatives, taking office on 16 September 1982. De Boer took a medical leave of absence on 11 October 1982 after which Minister of Health and Environment Til Gardeniers-Berendsen served as acting Minister of Culture, Recreation and Social Work. Following the second cabinet formation of 1982, De Boer was not giving a cabinet post in the new cabinet, the Van Agt III cabinet was replaced by the Lubbers I cabinet on 4 November 1982 and he continued to serve in the House of Representatives as a frontbencher and spokesperson for welfare, sport, social work and culture.

In February 1983 De Boer was nominated as mayor of Haarlemmermeer, and he resigned as a member of the House of Representatives the same day he was installed as mayor, taking office on 13 March 1983. In September 1985 De Boer was appointed as Secretary-General of the Ministry of Welfare, Health and Culture; he resigned as mayor on 1 October 1985 and was installed as secretary-general, serving from 1 January 1986 until 16 October 1995. In October 1995 De Boer was nominated as chairman of the executive board of the Nederlandse Vereniging van Ziekenhuizen (NVZ), he resigned as secretary-general the same day he was installed as chairman on 16 October 1995.

De Boer retired from active politics and became active in the private sector and public sector and occupied numerous seats as a corporate director and nonprofit director on several boards of directors and supervisory boards (Stork B.V., Stichting Pensioenfonds Zorg en Welzijn, European Cultural Foundation, Intertrust Group Transnational Institute, Max Havelaar Foundation and the World Press Photo) and served on several state commissions and councils on behalf of the government (Stichting Pensioenfonds ABP, Advisory Council for Spatial Planning, Environmental Assessment Agency and the Social and Economic Council).

== Decorations ==
Honours
Ribbon bar	Honour	Country	Date	Comment
	Grand Officer of the Order of Orange-Nassau	Netherlands	9 December 1982	
	Knight of the Order of the Netherlands Lion	Netherlands	1 August 1995	

Party political offices
Preceded by Jan de Koning	Chairman of the Anti-Revolutionary Party; 1975–1980	Party merged into the Christian Democratic Appeal
Political offices
Preceded by Jeltien Kraaijeveld-Wouters; Gerard Wallis de Vries	State Secretary for Culture, Recreation and Social Work; 1981–1982	Office discontinued
Preceded by André van der Louw	Minister of Culture, Recreation and Social Work; 1982	Succeeded by Til Gardeniers-Berendsen; Ad interim
Preceded by Cor van Stam	Mayor of Haarlemmermeer; 1983–1985	Succeeded by Aad van Dulst
Civic offices
Preceded by Wolter Lemstra	Secretary-General of the Ministry of Welfare, Health and Culture; 1986–1995	Succeeded by Helen de Maat-Koolen
Business positions
Unknown	General-Secretary of the Christian Farmers and Gardeners association 1970–1972	Succeeded by Fred Borgman
Preceded by Gijs van Aardenne	Chairman of the Nederlandse Vereniging van Ziekenhuizen; 1995–2007	Succeeded by Roelf de Boer
Non-profit organization positions
Preceded by Meindert Leerling	Chairman of the Anti-Revolutionaire Jongerenstudieclubs; 1968–1973	Succeeded by Fred Borgman
