= Van der Louw =

van der Louw is a surname. Notable people with the surname include:

- André van der Louw (1933–2005), Dutch politician
- Hans van der Louw (born 1958), Dutch general
