= André van der Louw =

Dutch politician (1933–2005)

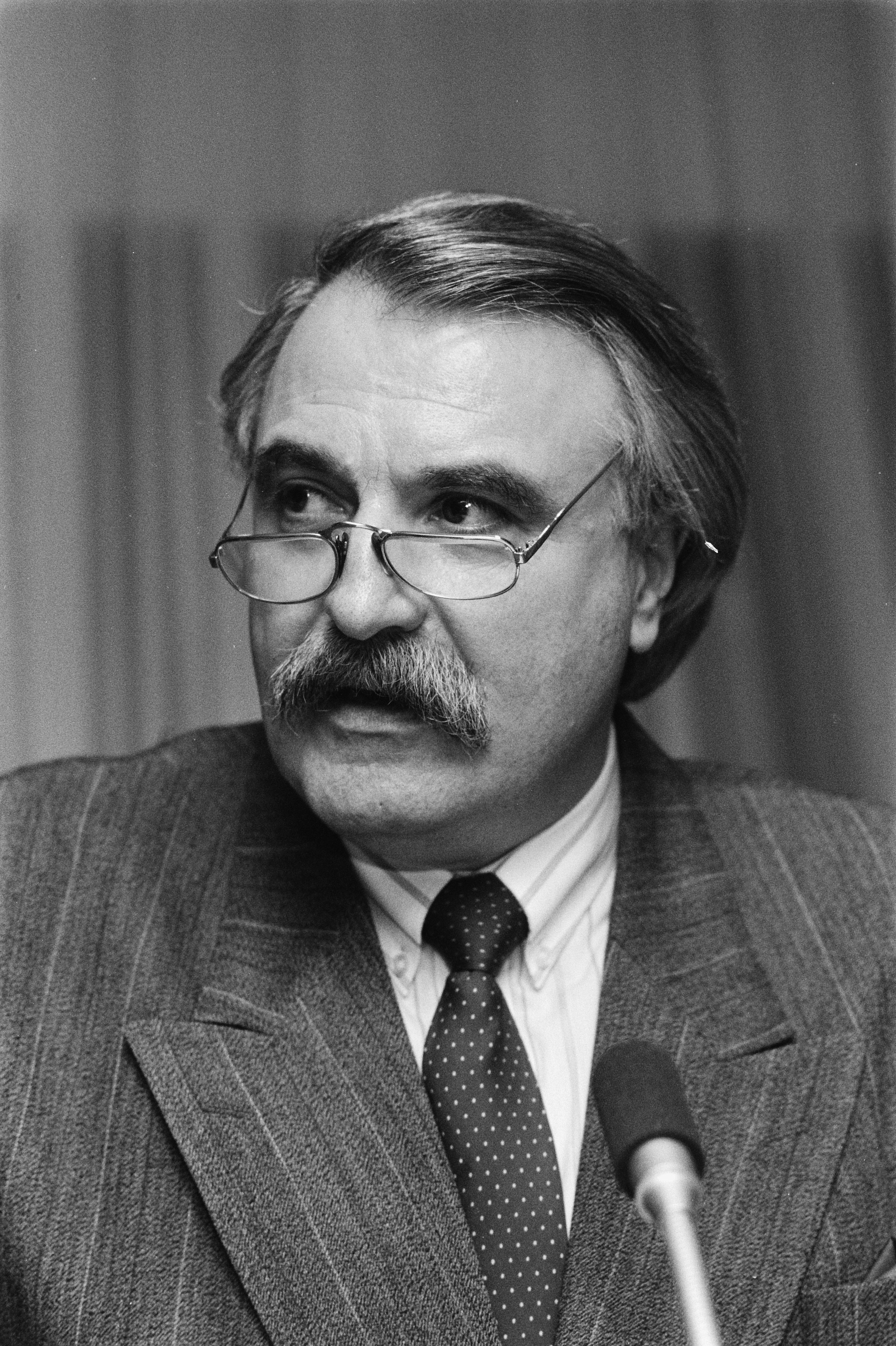
- André van der Louw in 1989

Chairman of the Rijnmond Council
- In office 16 April 1983 – 1 February 1986
- Preceded by: Ad Oele
- Succeeded by: Office discontinued

Minister of Culture, Recreation and Social Work
- In office 11 September 1981 – 29 May 1982
- Prime Minister: Dries van Agt
- Preceded by: Til Gardeniers-Berendsen
- Succeeded by: Hans de Boer

Mayor of Rotterdam
- In office 16 November 1974 – 11 September 1981
- Preceded by: Minus Polak (Ad interim)
- Succeeded by: Wim van der Have (Ad interim)

Chairman of the Labour Party
- In office 1 May 1971 – 16 November 1974
- Leader: Joop den Uyl
- Preceded by: Anne Vondeling
- Succeeded by: Ien van den Heuvel-de Blank

Member of the House of Representatives
- In office 16 September 1982 – 16 April 1983
- In office 12 January 1971 – 1 May 1971
- Parliamentary group: Labour Party

Personal details
- Born: Arie Andries van der Louw; 9 August 1933 The Hague, Netherlands
- Died: 20 October 2005 (aged 72) Scheveningen, Netherlands
- Cause of death: Lung cancer
- Party: Labour Party (from 1949)
- Spouses: Corinna De Weerdt (m. 1965; div. 1977) Annelies Roelofszen (m. 1985)
- Children: Milan van der Louw; Petar van der Louw
- Occupation: Politician · Civil servant · Journalist · Editor · Author · Nonprofit director · Media administrator · Sport administrator · Political pundit · Activist

Arie Andries "Andre" van der Louw (9 August 1933 – 20 October 2005) was a Dutch politician of the Labour Party (PvdA) and journalist.

Van der Louw worked as a civil servant for municipality of The Hague from November 1953 until October 1957. Van der Louw worked as a journalist for the VARA from October 1957 until January 1971 as a political editor from October 1957 until September 1965 and as a managing editor from September 1965 until January 1971 and also as editor-in-chief of teen magazine Hitweek from September 1965 until April 1969. Van der Louw also was active as a political activist and was one of the leaders of the New Left movement in the Netherlands which aimed to steer the Labour Party more to the Left. Van der Louw became a Member of the House of Representatives after the resignation of Ed Berg, serving from 12 January 1971 until his resignation on 1 May 1971. Van der Louw served as Chairman of the Labour Party from 1 May 1971 until 16 November 1974. In October 1974 Van der Louw was nominated as Mayor of Rotterdam, taking office on 16 November 1974. Van der Louw was appointed as Minister of Culture, Recreation and Social Work in the Cabinet Van Agt II, taking office on 11 September 1981. The Cabinet Van Agt II fell just seven months into its term on 12 May 1982 and continued to serve in a demissionary capacity until it was replaced by the caretaker Cabinet Van Agt III on 29 May 1982.

Van der Louw remained in active politics, in March 1983 he was nominated as Chairman of the Rijnmond Council, a direct electable sub national administrative layer between the municipalities and the provinces in the Rijnmond Area, serving from 16 April 1983 until 1 February 1986. Van der Louw also became active in the public sector and occupied numerous seats as a nonprofit director on several boards of directors and supervisory boards (Royal Dutch Football Association, Dutch Broadcast Foundation, International Architecture Biennal Rotterdam, Stichting Pensioenfonds Zorg en Welzijn, Royal Library of the Netherlands and the International Institute of Social History) and served on several state commissions and councils on behalf of the government (Advisory Council for Spatial Planning, Probation Agency, Stichting Pensioenfonds ABP, Cadastre Agency and the Council for Public Administration).

Party political offices
| Preceded by Anne Vondeling | Chairman of the Labour Party; 1971–1974 | Succeeded by Ien van den Heuvel-de Blank |
Political offices
| Preceded by Wim Thomassen; Ad interim Minus Polak | Mayor of Rotterdam; 1974–1981 | Succeeded by Bram Peper; Ad interim Wim van der Have |
| Preceded by Til Gardeniers-Berendsen | Minister of Culture, Recreation and Social Work; 1982–1982 | Succeeded by Hans de Boer |
Civic offices
| Preceded by Ad Oele | Chairman of the Rijnmond Council; 1983–1986 | Succeeded by Office discontinued |
| Preceded by Theo Bot | Chairman of the Supervisory board of Stichting Pensioenfonds ABP; 1983–1993 | Succeeded by Gijs van Aardenne |
Non-profit organization positions
| Preceded by Harm Buiter | Chairman of the Association of Municipalities; 1978–1981 | Unknown |
| Unknown | Chairman of the Supervisory board of the International Institute of Social History; 1986–1996 | Unknown |
Media offices
| Preceded by Max de Jong | Chairman of the Supervisory board of Dutch Broadcast Foundation; 1994–1997 | Succeeded by Gerrit Jan Wolffensperger |
Sporting positions
| Unknown | Operations Director of the Royal Dutch Football Association; 1986–1989 | Unknown |
