= Third Van Agt cabinet =

Dutch government cabinet in 1982

- Cabinet of the Netherlands

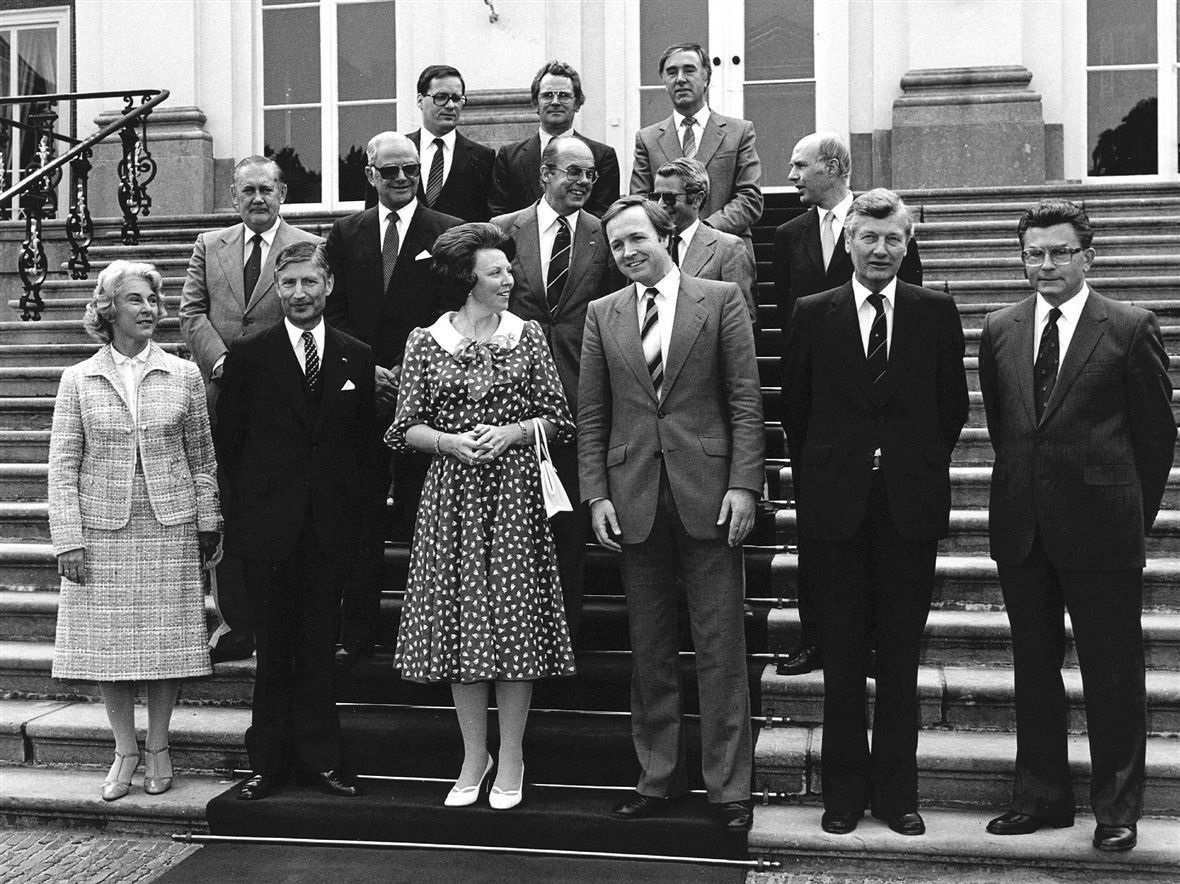
- Installation of the cabinet by Queen Beatrix at Huis ten Bosch on 29 May 1982
- Date formed: 29 May 1982
- Date dissolved: 4 November 1982; 159 days in office (Demissionary from 8 September 1982)

People and organisations
- Monarch: Queen Beatrix
- Prime Minister: Dries van Agt
- Deputy Prime Minister: Jan Terlouw
- No. of ministers: 14
- Member party: Christian Democratic Appeal (CDA); Democrats 66 (D'66)
- Status in legislature: Centrist; Minority government (Caretaker/Rump)

History
- Outgoing election: 1982 election
- Legislature terms: 1981–1982
- Outgoing formation: 1982 formation
- Predecessor: Second Van Agt cabinet
- Successor: First Lubbers cabinet

The third Van Agt cabinet was the executive branch of the Dutch Government from 29 May 1982 until 4 November 1982. The cabinet was formed by the Christian-democratic Christian Democratic Appeal (CDA) and the social-liberal Democrats 66 (D'66) after the fall of the previous Cabinet Van Agt II. The caretaker rump cabinet was a centrist coalition and had a minority in the House of Representatives with Christian Democratic Leader Dries van Agt continuing as Prime Minister and dual served as Minister of Foreign Affairs. Progressive-Liberal Leader Jan Terlouw continued as Deputy Prime Minister and Minister of Economic Affairs from previous cabinet.

The cabinet served in the early years of the economic expansion of the 1980s. Domestically its primary objective was to make preparations for a snap election in 1982, and it had to deal with a growing inflation following the recession in the 1980s and the Cent was removed as an active currency. Following the election the cabinet continued in a demissionary capacity until it was replaced by the First Lubbers cabinet.

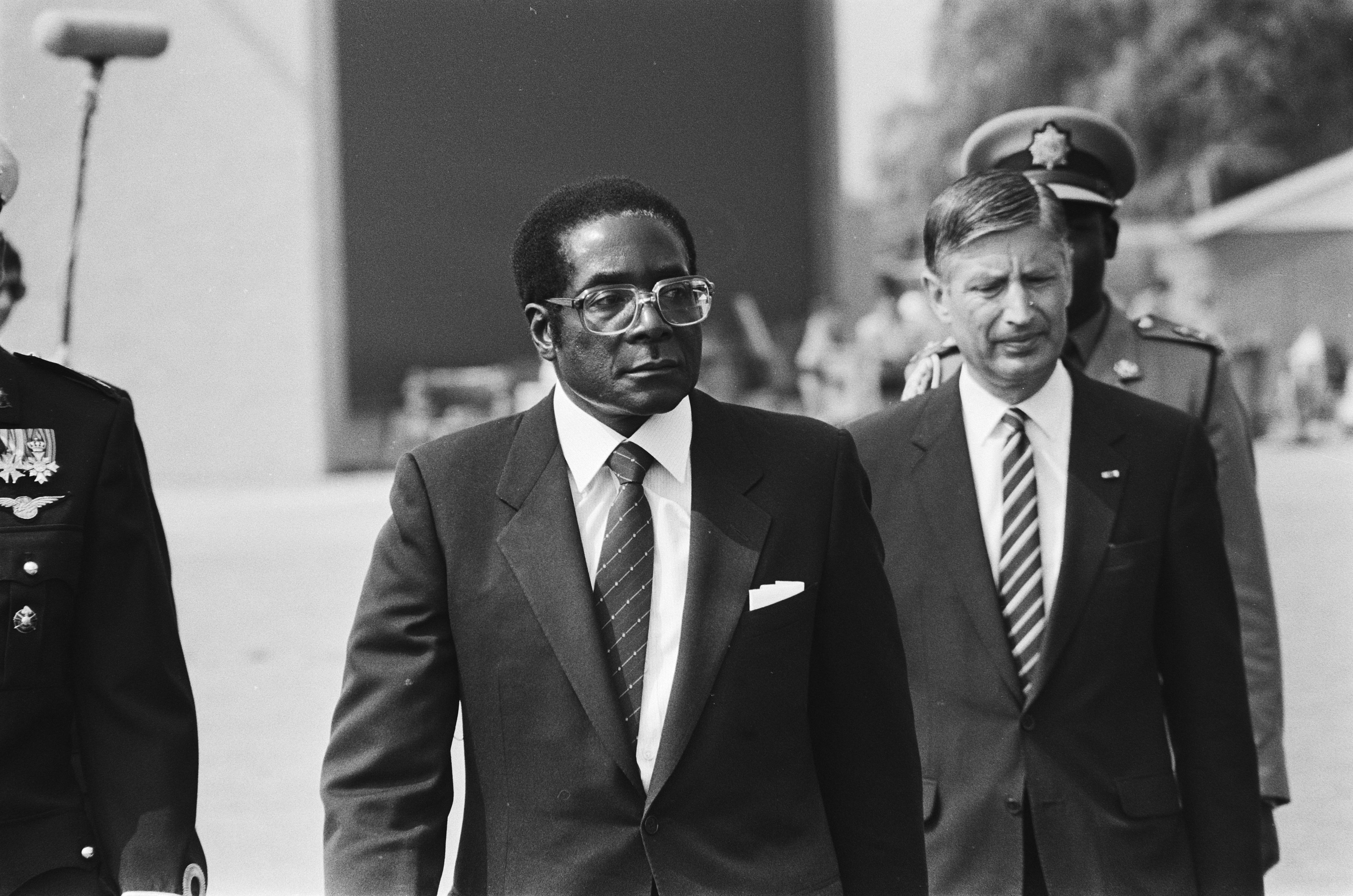
Prime Minister of Zimbabwe Robert Mugabe and Prime Minister Dries van Agt at Ypenburg Airport on 2 June 1982.

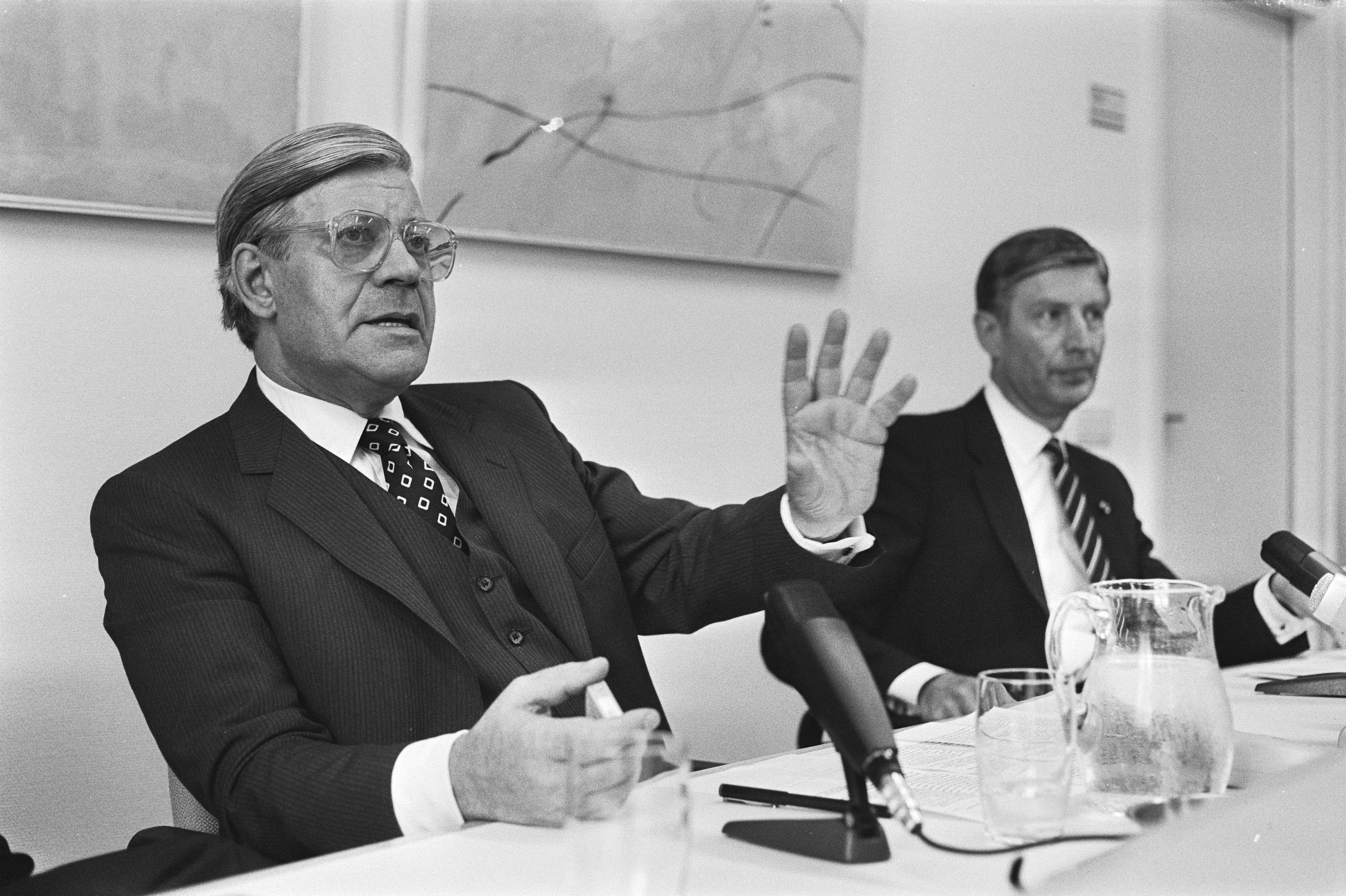
Chancellor of West-Germany Helmut Schmidt and Prime Minister Dries van Agt during a press conference at Airport Schiphol on 9 July 1982.

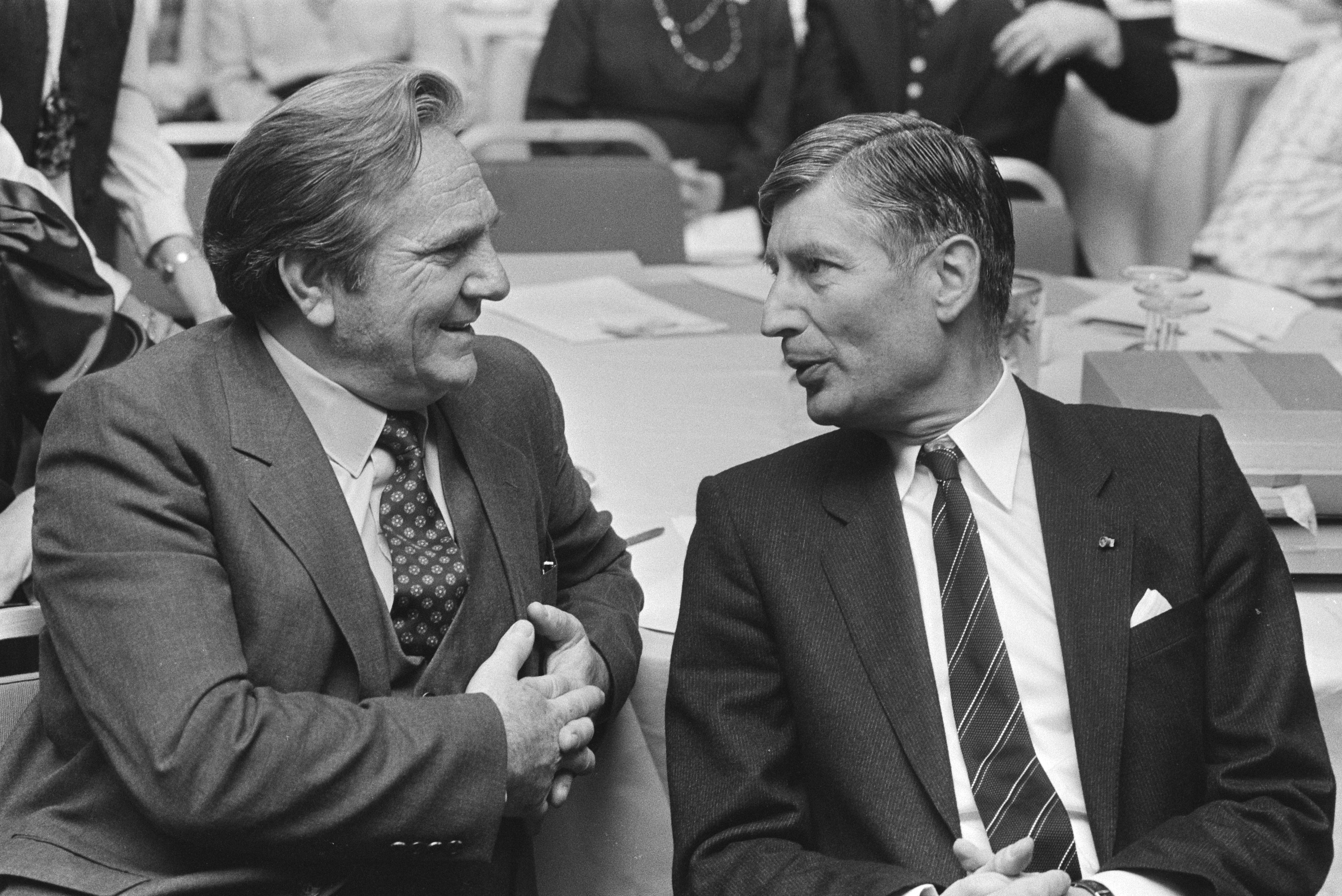
Israeli Ambassador Jacov Nechisthan and Prime Minister Dries van Agt at the Amsterdam Hilton Hotel on 18 October 1982.

== Formation ==
Composition of the cabinet in relation to the rest of the legislature

== Cabinet members ==
Ministers		Title/Ministry/Portfolio(s)			Term of office	Party
Dries van Agt	Dries van Agt (1931–2024)	Prime Minister	General Affairs		19 December 1977 – 4 November 1982^{[Retained]}	Christian; Democratic Appeal
Dries van Agt	Dries van Agt (1931–2024)	Minister	Foreign Affairs		29 May 1982 – 4 November 1982	Christian; Democratic Appeal
Jan Terlouw	Jan Terlouw (1931–2025)	Deputy; Prime Minister	Economic Affairs		11 September 1981 – 4 November 1982^{[Retained]}	Democrats 66
Jan Terlouw	Jan Terlouw (1931–2025)	Minister	Economic Affairs		11 September 1981 – 4 November 1982^{[Retained]}	Democrats 66
Max Rood	Max Rood (1927–2001)	Minister	Interior		29 May 1982 – 4 November 1982	Democrats 66
Fons van der Stee	Fons van der Stee (1928–1999)	Minister	Finance		5 March 1980 – 4 November 1982^{[Retained]}	Christian; Democratic Appeal
Job de Ruiter	Job de Ruiter (1930–2015)	Minister	Justice		19 December 1977 – 4 November 1982^{[Retained]}	Christian; Democratic Appeal
Hans van Mierlo	Hans van Mierlo (1931–2010)	Minister	Defence		11 September 1981 – 4 November 1982^{[Retained]}	Democrats 66
Til Gardeniers-Berendsen	Til Gardeniers- Berendsen (1925–2019)	Minister	Health and Environment		11 September 1981 – 4 November 1982^{[Retained]}	Christian; Democratic Appeal
Louw de Graaf	Louw de Graaf (1930–2020)	Minister	Social Affairs and Employment		29 May 1982 – 4 November 1982	Christian; Democratic Appeal
Wim Deetman	Wim Deetman (born 1945)	Minister	Education and Sciences		29 May 1982 – 14 September 1989^{[Continued]}	Christian; Democratic Appeal
Henk Zeevalking	Henk Zeevalking (1922–2005)	Minister	Transport and Water Management		11 September 1981 – 4 November 1982^{[Retained]}	Christian; Democratic Appeal
Jan de Koning	Jan de Koning (1926–1994)	Minister	Agriculture and Fisheries		11 September 1981 – 4 November 1982^{[Retained]}	Christian; Democratic Appeal
Jan de Koning	Jan de Koning (1926–1994)	Minister	Interior	• Netherlands; Antilles and Aruba Affairs	29 May 1982 – 7 November 1989^{[Continued]}	Christian; Democratic Appeal
Erwin Nypels	Erwin Nypels (1933–2024)	Minister	Housing and Spatial Planning		29 May 1982 – 4 November 1982	Democrats 66
Hans de Boer	Hans de Boer (born 1937)	Minister	Culture, Recreation and Social Work		29 May 1982 – 11 October 1982^{[Note]}	Christian; Democratic Appeal
Til Gardeniers-Berendsen	Til Gardeniers- Berendsen (1925–2019)	Minister	Culture, Recreation and Social Work		11 October 1982 – 4 November 1982^{[Acting]}	Christian; Democratic Appeal
Minister without portfolio		Title/Ministry/Portfolio(s)			Term of office	Party
Kees van Dijk	Kees van Dijk (1931–2008)	Minister	Foreign Affairs	• Development; Cooperation	11 September 1981 – 4 November 1982^{[Retained]}	Christian; Democratic Appeal
State Secretaries		Title/Ministry/Portfolio(s)			Term of office	Party
Gerard van Leijenhorst	Gerard van Leijenhorst (1928–2001)	State Secretary	Interior	• Municipalities • Emergency; Management • Minorities	11 September 1981 – 4 November 1982^{[Retained]}	Christian; Democratic Appeal
Hans van den Broek	Hans van den Broek (1936–2025)	State Secretary	Foreign Affairs	• European Union • Benelux	11 September 1981 – 4 November 1982^{[Retained]}	Christian; Democratic Appeal
Michiel Scheltema	Michiel; Scheltema (born 1939)	State Secretary	Justice)	• Immigration and Asylum • Civil Law • Youth Justice	11 September 1981 – 4 November 1982^{[Retained]}	Democrats 66
Piet van Zeil	Piet van Zeil (1927–2012)	State Secretary	Economic Affairs	• Small and Medium-sized; Businesses • Regional; Development • Consumer; Protection • Tourism	11 September 1981 – 22 June 1986^{[Retained]} ^{[Continued]}	Christian; Democratic Appeal
Piet van Zeil	Piet van Zeil (1927–2012)	State Secretary	Social Affairs and Employment	• Occupational; Safety • Elderly Care • Disability Policy	12 June 1982 – 4 November 1982	Christian; Democratic Appeal
Wim Dik	Wim Dik (1939–2022)	State Secretary	Economic Affairs	• Trade and Export	11 September 1981 – 4 November 1982^{[Retained]}	Democrats 66
Jan van Houwelingen	Jan van Houwelingen (1939–2013)	State Secretary	Defence)	• Human; Resources • Equipment	14 September 1981 – 7 November 1989^{[Retained]} ^{[Continued]}	Christian; Democratic Appeal
Ineke Lambers-Hacquebard	Ineke Lambers- Hacquebard (1946–2014)	State Secretary	Health and Environment	• Environmental; Policy • Food Policy	11 September 1981 – 4 November 1982^{[Retained]}	Democrats 66
Ad Hermes	Ad Hermes (1929–2002)	State Secretary	Education and Sciences	• Primary; Education • Special; Education • Adult; Education	9 January 1978 – 4 November 1982^{[Retained]}	Christian; Democratic Appeal

^{Acting}
^{Retained from the previous cabinet}
^{Continued in the next cabinet}
^{Medical leave of absence from 11 October 1982}
