= List of ministers of education of the Netherlands =

Minister of Education, Culture and Science of the Netherlands
- Minister van Onderwijs, Cultuur en Wetenschap
- Ministry of Education, Culture and Science

- Flag of the Kingdom of the Netherlands
- Incumbent; Gouke Moes since 5 September 2025
- Ministry of Education, Culture and Science
- Style: His/Her Excellency
- Member of: Council of Ministers
- Appointer: The monarch on advice of the prime minister
- Formation: 17 February 1798; 228 years ago
- First holder: Theodorus van Kooten as Secretary of National Education
- Deputy: Koen Becking as State Secretary for Primary and Secondary Education and Equal Opportunities
- Salary: €205,991 (As of 2025)

The minister of education, culture and science (Dutch: Minister van Onderwijs, Cultuur en Wetenschap) is the head of the Ministry of Education, Culture and Science and a member of the Cabinet and the Council of Ministers. The current minister of education, culture and science is Gouke Moes of Farmer–Citizen Movement (BBB). The minister of education, culture and science is often assigned a state secretary who is tasked with specific portfolios, currently Koen Becking of the People's Party for Freedom and Democracy (VVD). In the past, there have been ministers without portfolio assigned to the Ministry of Education, Culture and Science.

== List of ministers of education ==
=== Education, arts and sciences (1918–1965) ===
Portrait	Name (Birth–Death)	Term of office	Party	Cabinet
Johannes Theodoor de Visser	Johannes Theodoor de Visser (1857–1932)	25 September 1918 – 4 August 1925	Christian; Historical Union	Ruijs de Beerenbrouck I, II
Victor Rutgers	Victor Rutgers (1877–1945)	4 August 1925 – 8 March 1926	Anti-Revolutionary; Party	Colijn I
Marius Waszink	Marius Waszink (1881–1943)	8 March 1926 – 10 August 1929	Roman Catholic; State Party	De Geer I
Jan Terpstra	Jan Terpstra (1888–1952)	10 August 1929 – 26 May 1933	Anti-Revolutionary; Party	Ruijs de Beerenbrouck III
Henri Marchant	Henri Marchant (1869–1956)	26 May 1933 – 18 May 1935; Resigned	Free-thinking; Democratic League	Colijn II
Jan Rudolph Slotemaker de Bruïne	Jan Rudolph; Slotemaker de Bruïne (1869–1941)	18 May 1935 – 25 July 1939^{[Minister]}	Christian; Historical Union	Colijn II
Jan Rudolph Slotemaker de Bruïne	Jan Rudolph; Slotemaker de Bruïne (1869–1941)	18 May 1935 – 25 July 1939^{[Minister]}	Christian; Historical Union	Colijn III, IV
Bep Schrieke	Bep Schrieke (1890–1945)	25 July 1939 – 10 August 1939	Independent; Liberal	Colijn V
Gerrit Bolkestein	Gerrit Bolkestein (1871–1956)	10 August 1939 – 25 June 1945	Free-thinking; Democratic League	De Geer II
Gerrit Bolkestein	Gerrit Bolkestein (1871–1956)	10 August 1939 – 25 June 1945	Free-thinking; Democratic League	Gerbrandy I, II, III
Gerard van der Leeuw	Gerard van der Leeuw (1898–1981)	25 June 1945 – 3 July 1946	Social Democratic; Workers' Party	Schermerhorn–Drees
Gerard van der Leeuw	Gerard van der Leeuw (1898–1981)	25 June 1945 – 3 July 1946	Labour Party	Schermerhorn–Drees
Jos Gielen	Jos Gielen (1898–1981)	3 July 1946 – 7 August 1948	Catholic; People's Party	Beel I
Theo Rutten	Theo Rutten (1899–1980)	7 August 1948 – 2 September 1952	Catholic; People's Party	Drees–Van Schaik
Theo Rutten	Theo Rutten (1899–1980)	7 August 1948 – 2 September 1952	Catholic; People's Party	Drees I
Jo Cals	Jo Cals (1914–1971)	2 September 1952 – 24 July 1963^{[Note]}	Catholic; People's Party	Drees II, III
Jo Cals	Jo Cals (1914–1971)	2 September 1952 – 24 July 1963^{[Note]}	Catholic; People's Party	Beel II
Jo Cals	Jo Cals (1914–1971)	2 September 1952 – 24 July 1963^{[Note]}	Catholic; People's Party	De Quay
Theo Bot	Theo Bot (1911–1984)	24 July 1963 – 14 April 1965	Catholic; People's Party	Marijnen

^{Replaced by Marga Klompé during medical leaves of absence from 7 November 1961 until 4 February 1962, and from 23 April 1963 until 24 July 1963}

=== Education and sciences (1965–1994) ===
Portrait	Name (Birth–Death)	Term of office	Party	Cabinet
Isaäc Arend Diepenhorst	Dr. Isaäc Arend Diepenhorst (1916–2004)	14 April 1965 – 5 April 1967	Anti-Revolutionary; Party	Cals
Isaäc Arend Diepenhorst	Dr. Isaäc Arend Diepenhorst (1916–2004)	14 April 1965 – 5 April 1967	Anti-Revolutionary; Party	Zijlstra
Gerard Veringa	Dr. Gerard Veringa (1924–1999)	5 April 1967 – 6 July 1971	Catholic; People's Party	De Jong
Chris van Veen	Chris van Veen (1922–2009)	6 July 1971 – 11 May 1973	Christian; Historical Union	Biesheuvel I, II
Jos van Kemenade	Jos van Kemenade (1937–2020)	11 May 1973 – 19 December 1977	Labour Party	Den Uyl
Arie Pais	Arie Pais (1930–2022)	19 December 1977 – 11 September 1981	People's Party for Freedom and Democracy	Van Agt I
Jos van Kemenade	Jos van Kemenade (1937–2020)	11 September 1981 – 29 May 1982; Resigned	Labour Party	Van Agt II
Wim Deetman	Wim Deetman (born 1945)	29 May 1982 – 14 September 1989^{[App]}	Christian; Democratic Appeal	Van Agt III
Wim Deetman	Wim Deetman (born 1945)	29 May 1982 – 14 September 1989^{[App]}	Christian; Democratic Appeal	Lubbers I
Wim Deetman	Wim Deetman (born 1945)	29 May 1982 – 14 September 1989^{[App]}	Christian; Democratic Appeal	Lubbers II
Gerrit Braks	Gerrit Braks (1933–2017)	14 September 1989 – 7 November 1989; Ad interim^{[Minister]}	Christian; Democratic Appeal	Lubbers II
Jo Ritzen	Jo Ritzen (born 1945)	7 November 1989 – 22 August 1994	Labour Party	Lubbers III

^{Appointed as Speaker of the House of Representatives}
^{Minister of Agriculture and Fisheries}

=== Education, culture and science (since 1994) ===
Portrait	Name (Birth–Death)	Term of office	Party	Cabinet
Jo Ritzen	Dr. Jo Ritzen (born 1945)	22 August 1994 – 3 August 1998	Labour Party	Kok I
Loek Hermans	Loek Hermans (born 1951)	3 August 1998 – 22 July 2002	People's Party for Freedom and Democracy	Kok II
Maria van der Hoeven	Maria van der Hoeven (born 1949)	22 July 2002 – 22 February 2007	Christian; Democratic Appeal	Balkenende I, II, III
Ronald Plasterk	Dr. Ronald Plasterk (born 1957)	22 February 2007 – 23 February 2010; Resigned	Labour Party	Balkenende IV
André Rouvoet	André Rouvoet (born 1962)^{[Deputy]}	23 February 2010 – 14 October 2010^{[Minister]}	Christian Union	Balkenende IV
Marja van Bijsterveldt	Marja van Bijsterveldt (born 1961)	14 October 2010 – 5 November 2012	Christian; Democratic Appeal	Rutte I
Jet Bussemaker	Dr. Jet Bussemaker (born 1961)	5 November 2012 – 26 October 2017	Labour Party	Rutte II
Ingrid van Engelshoven	Ingrid van Engelshoven (born 1966)	26 October 2017 – 10 January 2022	Democrats 66	Rutte III
Robbert Dijkgraaf	Dr. Robbert Dijkgraaf (born 1960)	10 January 2022 – 2 July 2024	Democrats 66	Rutte IV
Eppo Bruins	Eppo Bruins (born 1969)	2 July 2024 – 22 August 2025	New Social Contract	Schoof
Sophie Hermans	Sophie Hermans (born 1981)	22 August 2025 – 5 September 2025^{[Acting]}	People's Party for Freedom and Democracy	Schoof
	Gouke Moes (born 1991)	5 September 2025 – Incumbent	Farmer–Citizen Movement	Schoof

^{Deputy Prime Minister}
^{Minister without Portfolio for Health, Welfare and Sport}

== List of ministers without portfolio ==
Portrait	Name (Birth–Death)	Portfolio(s)	Term of office	Party	Cabinet
Mauk de Brauw	Jonkheer; Mauk de Brauw (1925–1984)	• Higher; Education • Science Policy	6 July 1971 – 21 July 1972; Resigned	Democratic; Socialists '70	Biesheuvel I
Chris van Veen	Chris van Veen (1922–2009)	• Higher; Education • Science Policy	21 July 1972 – 11 May 1973^{[Minister]}	Christian; Historical Union	Biesheuvel I
Chris van Veen	Chris van Veen (1922–2009)	• Higher; Education • Science Policy	21 July 1972 – 11 May 1973^{[Minister]}	Christian; Historical Union	Biesheuvel II
Boy Trip	Boy Trip (1921–1990)	• Science Policy	11 May 1973 – 19 December 1977	Political Party of Radicals	Den Uyl
Rinus Peijnenburg	Rinus Peijnenburg (1928–1979)	• Science Policy	19 December 1977 – 1 April 1979; Died in office	Catholic; People's Party	Van Agt I
Leendert Ginjaar	Leendert Ginjaar (1928–2003)	• Science Policy	1 April 1979 – 3 May 1979; Acting^{[Minister]}	People's Party for Freedom and Democracy	Van Agt I
Ton van Trier	Ton van Trier (1926–1983)	• Science Policy	3 May 1979 – 11 September 1981	Independent; Catholic	Van Agt I
Ton van Trier	Ton van Trier (1926–1983)	• Science Policy	3 May 1979 – 11 September 1981	Catholic; People's Party	Van Agt I
Ton van Trier	Ton van Trier (1926–1983)	• Science Policy	3 May 1979 – 11 September 1981	Christian; Democratic Appeal	Van Agt I
Not in use (1981–2017)
Arie Slob	Arie Slob (born 1961)	• Primary; Education • Secondary; Education • Special; Education • Preschool • Media	26 October 2017 – 10 January 2022	Christian Union	Rutte III
Dennis Wiersma	Dennis Wiersma (born 1986)	• Primary; Education • Secondary; Education • Special; Education • Preschool • Media	10 January 2022 – 22 June 2023	People's Party for Freedom and Democracy	Rutte IV
Mariëlle Paul	Mariëlle Paul (born 1966)	• Primary; Education • Secondary; Education • Special; Education • Preschool • Media	21 July 2023 – 2 July 2024	People's Party for Freedom and Democracy	Rutte IV
Not in use (since 2024)

^{Minister of Education and Sciences}
^{Minister of Health and Environment}

== List of state secretaries for education ==
=== Education, arts and sciences (1950–1965) ===
Portrait	Name (Birth–Death)	Portfolio(s)	Term of office	Party	Cabinet
Jo Cals	Jo Cals (1914–1971)	• Youth Care • Nature • Media • Culture • Art • Recreation • Sport	15 March 1950 – 2 September 1952	Catholic; People's Party	Drees–Van Schaik
Jo Cals	Jo Cals (1914–1971)	• Youth Care • Nature • Media • Culture • Art • Recreation • Sport	15 March 1950 – 2 September 1952	Catholic; People's Party	Drees I
Anna de Waal	Dr. Anna de Waal (1906–1981)	• Primary; Education • Secondary; Education • Special; Education • Youth Care	2 February 1953 – 16 March 1957; Resigned	Catholic; People's Party	Drees II
Anna de Waal	Dr. Anna de Waal (1906–1981)	• Primary; Education • Secondary; Education • Special; Education • Youth Care	2 February 1953 – 16 March 1957; Resigned	Catholic; People's Party	Drees III
René Höppener	René Höppener (1903–1983)	• Youth Care • Nature • Media • Culture • Art • Recreation • Sport	12 November 1956 – 19 May 1959	Catholic; People's Party	Drees III
René Höppener	René Höppener (1903–1983)	• Youth Care • Nature • Media • Culture • Art • Recreation • Sport	12 November 1956 – 19 May 1959	Catholic; People's Party	Beel II
Gerard Stubenrouch	Gerard Stubenrouch (1918–1962)	• Primary; Education • Secondary; Education	16 June 1959 – 22 April 1962; Died in office	Catholic; People's Party	De Quay
Harry Janssen	Dr. Harry Janssen (1910–1982)	• Primary; Education • Secondary; Education	4 June 1962 – 24 July 1963	Catholic; People's Party	De Quay
Ynso Scholten	Ynso Scholten (1918–1984)	• Youth Care • Nature • Media • Culture • Art • Recreation • Sport	16 June 1959 – 24 July 1963	Christian; Historical Union	De Quay
Hans Grosheide	Hans Grosheide (1930–2022)	• Primary; Education • Secondary; Education • Special; Education	3 September 1963 – 14 April 1965	Anti-Revolutionary; Party	Marijnen
Louis van de Laar	Louis van de Laar (1921–2004)	• Social Services • Youth Care • Media • Culture • Art • Recreation • Sport	24 October 1963 – 14 April 1965	Catholic; People's Party	Marijnen

=== Education and sciences (1965–1994) ===
Portrait	Name (Birth–Death)	Portfolio(s)	Term of office	Party	Cabinet
Hans Grosheide	Hans Grosheide (1930–2022)	• Primary; Education • Secondary; Education • Special; Education	14 April 1965 – 6 July 1971	Anti-Revolutionary; Party	Cals
Hans Grosheide	Hans Grosheide (1930–2022)	• Primary; Education • Secondary; Education • Special; Education	14 April 1965 – 6 July 1971	Anti-Revolutionary; Party	Zijlstra
Hans Grosheide	Hans Grosheide (1930–2022)	• Primary; Education • Secondary; Education • Special; Education	14 April 1965 – 6 July 1971	Anti-Revolutionary; Party	De Jong
Kees Schelfhout	Kees Schelfhout (1918–1983)	• Primary; Education • Special; Education • Preschool	28 July 1971 – 11 May 1973	Catholic; People's Party	Biesheuvel I, II
Ger Klein	Dr. Ger Klein (1925–1998)	• Higher education	11 May 1973 – 8 September 1977; Resigned	Labour Party	Den Uyl
Antoon Veerman	Dr. Antoon Veerman (1916–1993)	• Secondary; Education • Special; Education	11 May 1973 – 1 September 1975; Resigned	Anti-Revolutionary; Party	Den Uyl
Klaas de Jong Ozn.	Klaas de Jong Ozn. (1926–2011)	• Secondary; Education • Special; Education	1 September 1975 – 19 December 1977	Anti-Revolutionary; Party	Den Uyl
Klaas de Jong Ozn.	Klaas de Jong Ozn. (1926–2011)	• Secondary; Education	19 December 1977 – 11 September 1981	Anti-Revolutionary; Party	Van Agt I
Ad Hermes	Ad Hermes (1929–2002)	• Primary; Education	9 January 1978 – 29 May 1982	Catholic; People's Party	Van Agt I
Ad Hermes	Ad Hermes (1929–2002)	• Primary; Education	9 January 1978 – 29 May 1982	Christian; Democratic Appeal	Van Agt II
Ad Hermes	Ad Hermes (1929–2002)	• Primary; Education • Special; Education	29 May 1982 – 4 November 1982	Christian; Democratic Appeal	Van Agt III
Wim Deetman	Wim Deetman (born 1945)	• Secondary; Education • Adult; Education	11 September 1981 – 29 May 1982	Christian; Democratic Appeal	Van Agt II
Nell Ginjaar-Maas	Nell Ginjaar-Maas (1931–2012)	• Secondary; Education • Adult; Education	5 November 1982 – 14 July 1986	People's Party for Freedom and Democracy	Lubbers I
Nell Ginjaar-Maas	Nell Ginjaar-Maas (1931–2012)	• Primary; Education • Secondary; Education • Adult; Education	14 July 1986 – 7 November 1989	People's Party for Freedom and Democracy	Lubbers II
Gerard van Leijenhorst	Gerard van Leijenhorst (1928–2001)	• Primary; Education	8 November 1982 – 14 July 1986	Christian; Democratic Appeal	Lubbers I
Jacques Wallage	Jacques Wallage (1946–2026)	• Primary; Education • Secondary; Education • Special; Education	7 November 1989 – 9 June 1993^{[App]}	Labour Party	Lubbers III
Roel in 't Veld	Dr. Roel in 't Veld (born 1942)	• Secondary; Education • Higher education • Science Policy	9 June 1993 – 19 June 1993; Resigned	Labour Party	Lubbers III
Job Cohen	Dr. Job Cohen (born 1947)	• Higher education • Science Policy	2 July 1993 – 22 August 1994	Labour Party	Lubbers III

^{Appointed as State Secretary for Social Affairs and Employment}

=== Education, culture and science (since 1994) ===
Portrait	Name (Birth–Death)	Portfolio(s)	Term of office	Party	Cabinet
Tineke Netelenbos	Tineke Netelenbos (born 1944)	• Primary; Education • Secondary; Education • Special; Education	22 August 1994 – 3 August 1998	Labour Party	Kok I
Aad Nuis	Aad Nuis (1933–2007)	• Science Policy • Media • Culture • Art	22 August 1994 – 3 August 1998	Democrats 66	Kok I
Karin Adelmund	Karin Adelmund (1949–2005)	• Primary; Education • Secondary; Education • Special; Education	3 August 1998 – 22 July 2002	Labour Party	Kok II
Rick van der Ploeg	Dr. Rick van der Ploeg (born 1956)	• Media • Culture • Art	3 August 1998 – 22 July 2002	Labour Party	Kok II
Annette Nijs	Annette Nijs (born 1961)	• Higher; Education • Adult; Education • Science Policy	22 July 2002 – 9 June 2004; Resigned	People's Party for Freedom and Democracy	Balkenende I
Annette Nijs	Annette Nijs (born 1961)	• Higher; Education • Adult; Education • Science Policy	22 July 2002 – 9 June 2004; Resigned	People's Party for Freedom and Democracy	Balkenende II
Mark Rutte	Mark Rutte (born 1967)	• Higher; Education • Adult; Education • Science Policy	17 June 2004 – 27 June 2006; Resigned	People's Party for Freedom and Democracy	Balkenende II
Bruno Bruins	Bruno Bruins (born 1963)	• Higher; Education • Adult; Education • Science Policy	29 June 2006 – 3 July 2006	People's Party for Freedom and Democracy	Balkenende II
Bruno Bruins	Bruno Bruins (born 1963)	• Higher; Education • Adult; Education • Science Policy	3 July 2006 – 22 February 2007	People's Party for Freedom and Democracy	Balkenende III
	Cees van Leeuwen (born 1951)	• Media • Culture • Art	22 July 2002 – 27 May 2003	Pim Fortuyn List	Balkenende I
Medy van der Laan	Medy van der Laan (born 1968)	• Media • Culture • Art	27 May 2003 – 3 July 2006; Resigned	Democrats 66	Balkenende II
Marja van Bijsterveldt	Marja van Bijsterveldt (born 1961)	• Secondary; Education	22 February 2007 – 23 February 2010	Christian; Democratic Appeal	Balkenende IV
Marja van Bijsterveldt	Marja van Bijsterveldt (born 1961)	• Higher; Education • Secondary; Education • Science • Media • Culture • Art • Emancipation	23 February 2010 – 14 October 2010	Christian; Democratic Appeal	Balkenende IV
Sharon Dijksma	Sharon Dijksma (born 1971)	• Primary; Education • Special; Education • Preschool	22 February 2007 – 23 February 2010; Resigned	Labour Party	Balkenende IV
Halbe Zijlstra	Halbe Zijlstra (born 1969)	• Higher; Education • Adult; Education • Science Policy • Culture • Art	14 October 2010 – 5 November 2012	People's Party for Freedom and Democracy	Rutte I
Sander Dekker	Sander Dekker (born 1975)	• Higher; Education • Science Policy • Media • Culture • Art	5 November 2012 – 26 October 2017	People's Party for Freedom and Democracy	Rutte II
Vacant
Gunay Uslu	Dr. Gunay Uslu (born 1972)	• Culture • Media • Art	10 January 2022 – 1 December 2023	Democrats 66	Rutte IV
Robbert Dijkgraaf	Robbert Dijkgraaf (born 1960)	• Culture • Media • Art	1 December 2023 – 6 December 2023; Acting	Democrats 66	Rutte IV
Steven van Weyenberg	Steven van Weyenberg (born 1973)	• Culture • Media • Art	6 December 2023 – 12 January 2024	Democrats 66	Rutte IV
Fleur Gräper	Fleur Gräper (born 1974)	• Culture • Media • Art	12 January 2024 – 2 July 2024	Democrats 66	Rutte IV
Mariëlle Paul	Mariëlle Paul (born 1966)	• Primary; Education • Secondary; Education • Equal; Opportunities	2 July 2024 – 5 September 2025	People's Party for Freedom and Democracy	Schoof
Koen Becking	Koen Becking (born 1969)	• Primary; Education • Secondary; Education • Equal; Opportunities	5 September 2025 – Incumbent	People's Party for Freedom and Democracy	Schoof

== List of ministers of social work ==
=== Social work (1952–1965) ===
Portrait	Name (Birth–Death)	Term of office	Party	Cabinet
Louis Beel	Dr. Louis Beel (1902–1977)^{[Deputy]}	2 September 1952 – 9 September 1952; Ad Interim^{[Minister]}	Catholic; People's Party	Drees II
Frans-Jozef van Thiel	Frans-Jozef van Thiel (1906–1993)	9 September 1952 – 13 October 1956	Catholic; People's Party	Drees II
Marga Klompé	Dr. Marga Klompé (1912–1986)	13 October 1956 – 24 July 1963	Catholic; People's Party	Drees III
Marga Klompé	Dr. Marga Klompé (1912–1986)	13 October 1956 – 24 July 1963	Catholic; People's Party	Beel II
Marga Klompé	Dr. Marga Klompé (1912–1986)	13 October 1956 – 24 July 1963	Catholic; People's Party	De Quay
Jo Schouwenaar-Franssen	Jo Schouwenaar- Franssen (1909–1995)	24 July 1963 – 14 April 1965	People's Party for Freedom and Democracy	Marijnen

^{Deputy Prime Minister}
^{Minister of the Interior}

=== Culture, recreation and social work (1965–1982) ===
Portrait	Name (Birth–Death)	Term of office	Party	Cabinet
Maarten Vrolijk	Maarten Vrolijk (1919–1994)	14 April 1965 – 22 November 1966	Labour Party	Cals
Marga Klompé	Marga Klompé (1912–1986)	22 November 1966 – 7 January 1971^{[Note]}	Catholic; People's Party	Zijlstra
Marga Klompé	Marga Klompé (1912–1986)	22 November 1966 – 7 January 1971^{[Note]}	Catholic; People's Party	De Jong
Gerard Veringa	Gerard Veringa (1924–1999)	7 January 1971 – 22 February 1971; Acting^{[Minister]}	Catholic; People's Party	De Jong
Marga Klompé	Marga Klompé (1912–1986)	22 February 1971 – 6 July 1971	Catholic; People's Party	De Jong
Piet Engels	Piet Engels (1923–1994)	6 July 1971 – 11 May 1973	Catholic; People's Party	Biesheuvel I, II
Harry van Doorn	Harry van Doorn (1915–1992)	11 May 1973 – 19 December 1977	Political Party of Radicals	Den Uyl
Til Gardeniers-Berendsen	Til Gardeniers- Berendsen (1925–2019)	19 December 1977 – 11 September 1981	Catholic; People's Party	Van Agt I
Til Gardeniers-Berendsen	Til Gardeniers- Berendsen (1925–2019)	19 December 1977 – 11 September 1981	Christian; Democratic Appeal	Van Agt I
André van der Louw	André van der Louw (1933–2005)	11 September 1981 – 29 May 1982; Resigned	Labour Party	Van Agt II
Hans de Boer	Hans de Boer (born 1937)	29 May 1982 – 11 October 1982^{[Note]}	Christian; Democratic Appeal	Van Agt III
Til Gardeniers-Berendsen	Til Gardeniers- Berendsen (1925–2019)	11 October 1982 – 4 November 1982; Ad Interim^{[Minister]}	Christian; Democratic Appeal	Van Agt III

^{Medical leave of absence from 7 January 1971 until 22 February 1971}
^{Medical leave of absence from 11 October 1982}
^{Minister of Education and Sciences}
^{Minister of Health and Environment}

== List of state secretaries for social work ==
Portrait	Name (Birth–Death)	Portfolio(s)	Term of office	Party	Cabinet
Cees Egas	Cees Egas (1913–2001)	• Social Services • Youth Care • Nature • Culture • Art • Recreation • Sport	10 May 1965 – 22 November 1966	Labour Party	Cals
Vacant
Hein van de Poel	Hein van de Poel (1915–1993)	• Unemployment • Social Services • Youth Care • Nature • Culture • Art • Recreation • Sport	29 May 1967 – 6 July 1971	Catholic; People's Party	De Jong
Fia van Veenendaal-van Meggelen	Fia van Veenendaal- van Meggelen (1918–2005)	• Social Services • Disability Policy	28 July 1971 – 21 July 1972; Resigned	Democratic; Socialists '70	Biesheuvel I
Henk Vonhoff	Henk Vonhoff (1931–2010)	• Youth Care • Nature • Culture • Art • Recreation • Sport	28 July 1971 – 23 April 1973; Resigned	People's Party for Freedom and Democracy	Biesheuvel I
Henk Vonhoff	Henk Vonhoff (1931–2010)	• Social Services • Disability Policy • Youth Care • Nature • Culture • Art • Recreation • Sport	28 July 1971 – 23 April 1973; Resigned	People's Party for Freedom and Democracy	Biesheuvel II
Wim Meijer	Wim Meijer (born 1939)	• Social Services • Environmental; Policy • Nature • Recreation	11 May 1973 – 8 September 1977; Resigned	Labour Party	Den Uyl
Jeltien Kraaijeveld-Wouters	Jeltien; Kraaijeveld-Wouters (1932–2025)	• Unemployment • Equality • Emancipation	28 December 1977 – 9 September 1981; Resigned	Anti-Revolutionary; Party	Van Agt I
Jeltien Kraaijeveld-Wouters	Jeltien; Kraaijeveld-Wouters (1932–2025)	• Unemployment • Equality • Emancipation	28 December 1977 – 9 September 1981; Resigned	Christian; Democratic Appeal	Van Agt I
Gerard Wallis de Vries	Gerard Wallis de Vries (1936–2018)	• Social Services • Environmental; Policy • Nature • Media • Culture • Art • Recreation • Sport	4 January 1978 – 11 September 1981	People's Party for Freedom and Democracy	Van Agt I
Hans de Boer	Hans de Boer (born 1937)	• Social Services • Nature • Culture • Art • Recreation	11 September 1981 – 29 May 1982	Christian; Democratic Appeal	Van Agt II

== See also ==
- Ministry of Education, Culture and Science
