= Til Gardeniers-Berendsen =

Dutch politician (1925–2019)

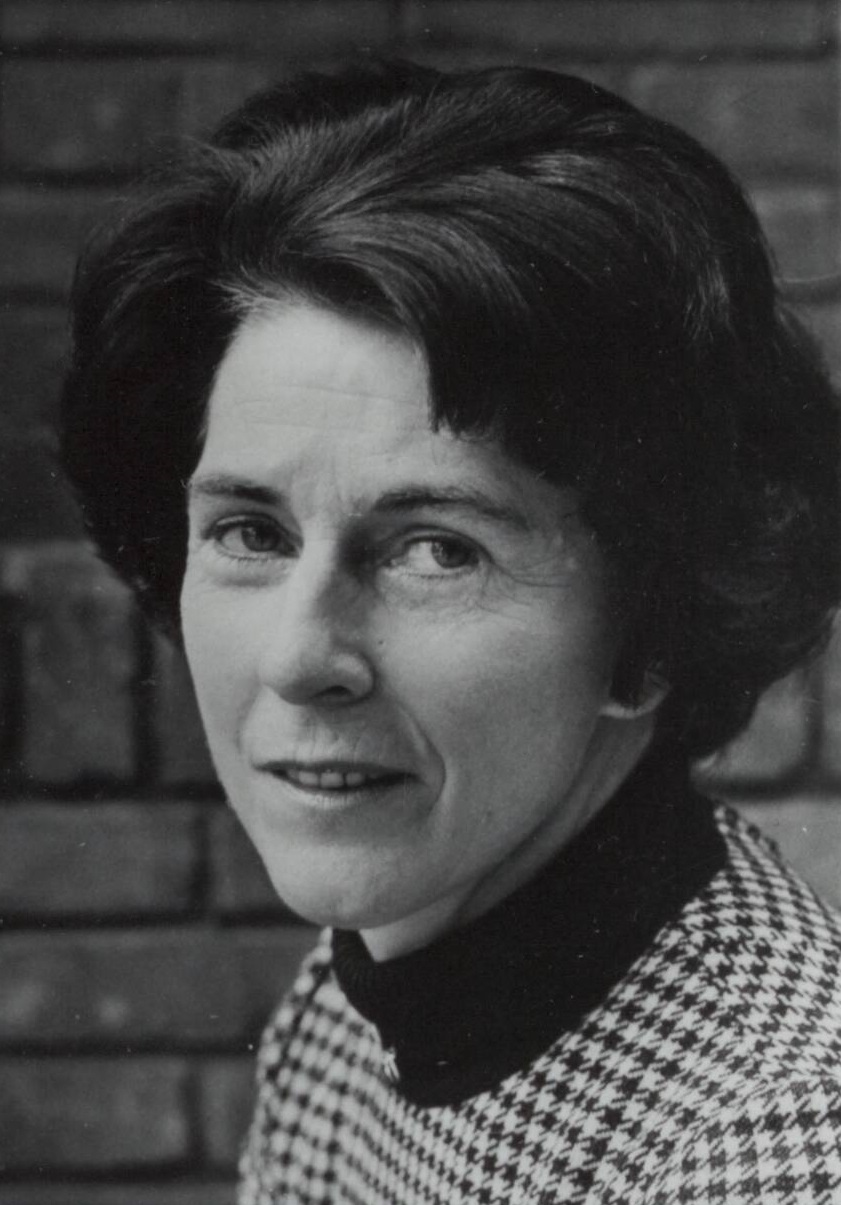
- Gardeniers-Berendsen in 1977

Member of the Council of State
- In office 1 March 1983 – 1 March 1995
- Vice President: Willem Scholten

Minister of Health and Environment
- In office 11 September 1981 – 4 November 1982
- Prime Minister: Dries van Agt
- Preceded by: Leendert Ginjaar
- Succeeded by: Elco Brinkman as Minister of Welfare, Health and Culture

Minister of Culture, Recreation and Social Work
- In office 11 October 1982 – 4 November 1982; Ad interim
- Prime Minister: Dries van Agt
- Preceded by: Hans de Boer
- Succeeded by: Elco Brinkman as Minister of Welfare, Health and Culture
- In office 19 December 1977 – 11 September 1981
- Prime Minister: Dries van Agt
- Preceded by: Harry van Doorn
- Succeeded by: André van der Louw

Member of the House of Representatives
- In office 21 September 1982 – 23 February 1983
- In office 10 June 1981 – 9 September 1981
- In office 11 May 1971 – 19 December 1977
- Parliamentary group: Christian Democratic Appeal (1980–1983); Catholic People's Party (1971–1980)

Personal details
- Born: Mathilde Hubertine Maria Francisca Berendsen; 18 February 1925 Rotterdam, Netherlands
- Died: 22 October 2019 (aged 94) The Hague, Netherlands
- Party: Christian Democratic Appeal (from 1980)
- Other party: Catholic People's Party (until 1980)
- Spouse: Mathieu Gardeniers (m. 1950; died 2004)
- Children: 3 sons
- Occupation: Politician · Civil servant · Secretary · Nonprofit director

Mathilde Hubertine Maria Francisca "Til" Gardeniers-Berendsen (18 February 1925 – 22 October 2019) was a Dutch politician of the defunct Catholic People's Party (KVP) and later the Christian Democratic Appeal (CDA) party and nonprofit director.

== Biography ==
On 14 May 1940 Gardeniers-Berendsen witnessed the Luftwaffe bombing of Rotterdam during the German invasion and joined the Dutch resistance against the German occupiers in 1940. Following the end of World War II Gardeniers-Berendsen worked as a secretary in Rotterdam from August 1945 until May 1971.

Gardeniers-Berendsen was elected as a Member of the House of Representatives after the election of 1971, taking office on 11 May 1971. After the election of 1977 Gardeniers-Berendsen was appointed as Minister of Culture, Recreation and Social Work in the Cabinet Van Agt–Wiegel, taking office on 19 December 1977. After the election of 1981 Gardeniers-Berendsen returned as a Member of the House of Representatives, taking office on 10 June 1981. Following the cabinet formation of 1981 Gardeniers-Berendsen was appointment as Minister of Health and Environment in the Cabinet Van Agt II, taking office on 11 September 1981. The Cabinet Van Agt II fell just seven months into its term on 12 May 1982 and continued to serve in a demissionary capacity until it was replaced by the caretaker Cabinet Van Agt III with Gardeniers-Berendsen continuing as Minister of Health and Environment, taking office on 29 May 1982. After the election of 1982 Gardeniers-Berendsen again returned as a Member of the House of Representatives, taking office on 21 September 1982. Gardeniers-Berendsen served again as acting Minister of Culture, Recreation and Social Work during a medical leave of absence of Hans de Boer dual serving in both positions from 11 October 1982. Following the cabinet formation of 1982 Gardeniers-Berendsen was not given a cabinet post in the new cabinet, the Cabinet Van Agt III was replaced by the Cabinet Lubbers I on 4 November 1982 and she continued to serve as a frontbencher.

In February 1983 Gardeniers-Berendsen was nominated as a Member of the Council of State, she resigned as a Member of the House of Representatives on 23 February 1983 and was installed as a Member of the Council of State, serving from 1 March 1983 until 1 March 1995.

== Decorations ==
Honours
Ribbon bar	Honour	Country	Date	Comment
	Commander of the Order of Leopold II	Belgium	28 September 1980	
	Grand Officer of the Order of Orange-Nassau	Netherlands	9 December 1982	
	Knight of the Order of the Holy Sepulchre	Holy See	15 July 1990	
	Commander of the Order of the Netherlands Lion	Netherlands	1 March 1995	
	Medal of Honour for Ingenuity and Entrepreneurship in gold	Netherlands	1995	

Political offices
Preceded by Harry van Doorn	Minister of Culture, Recreation and Social Work; 1977–1981; 1982; Ad interim	Succeeded by André van der Louw
Preceded by Hans de Boer	Minister of Culture, Recreation and Social Work; 1977–1981; 1982; Ad interim	Succeeded by Elco Brinkman as Minister of Welfare, Health and Culture
Preceded by Leendert Ginjaar	Minister of Health and Environment; 1981–1982	Succeeded by Elco Brinkman as Minister of Welfare, Health and Culture
