= Ineke Lambers-Hacquebard =

Dutch politician

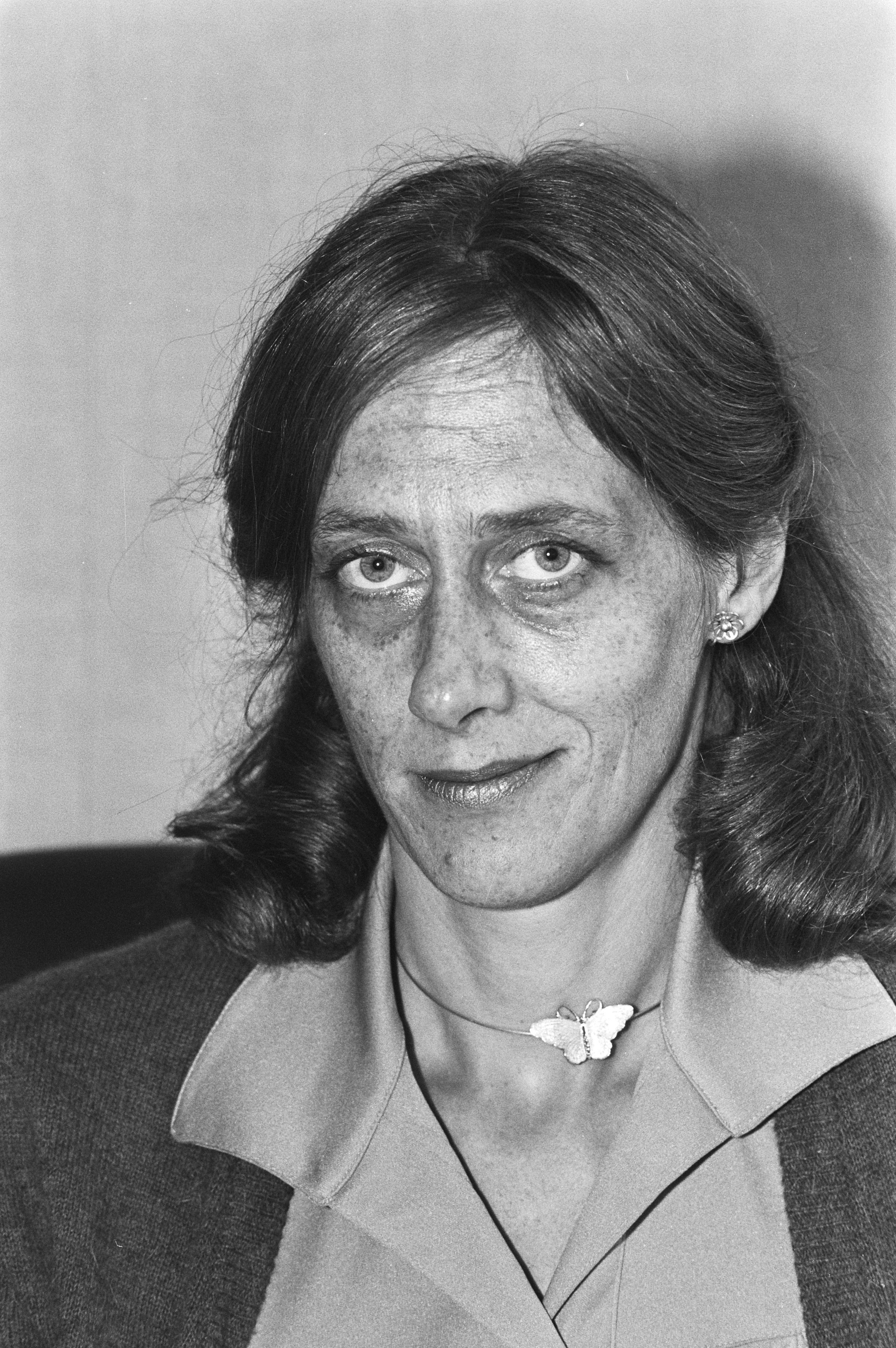
Lambers-Hacquebard in 1981

Ineke Lambers-Hacquebard (12 March 1946 in Deventer – 12 May 2014 in Roden) was a Dutch politician. She was a member of D66 and State Secretary (Netherlands) of Public Health and Environmental Hygiene in the Second Van Agt cabinet and the Third Van Agt cabinet.

She was a member of the House of Representatives from 1977 to 1981 and again from 1982 to 1983, focusing on environmental affairs, transport and water management, agriculture and energy. After leaving politics, she chaired the executive board of the Rijkshogeschool Groningen from 1986 to 1989 and was an inspector of higher education from 1989 to 1992.

She became a Commander of Order of Orange-Nassau in 1982. She died in 2014.
