= GLOBIO Model =

Global biodiversity model

The GLOBIO Model is a global biodiversity model developed by the Netherlands Environmental Assessment Agency to support policy makers by quantifying global human impacts on biodiversity and ecosystems.

It is designed to quantify human impacts on biodiversity at large (regional to global) scales.
