= Harry van Doorn =

Dutch politician (1915–1992)

His Excellency Harry van Doorn
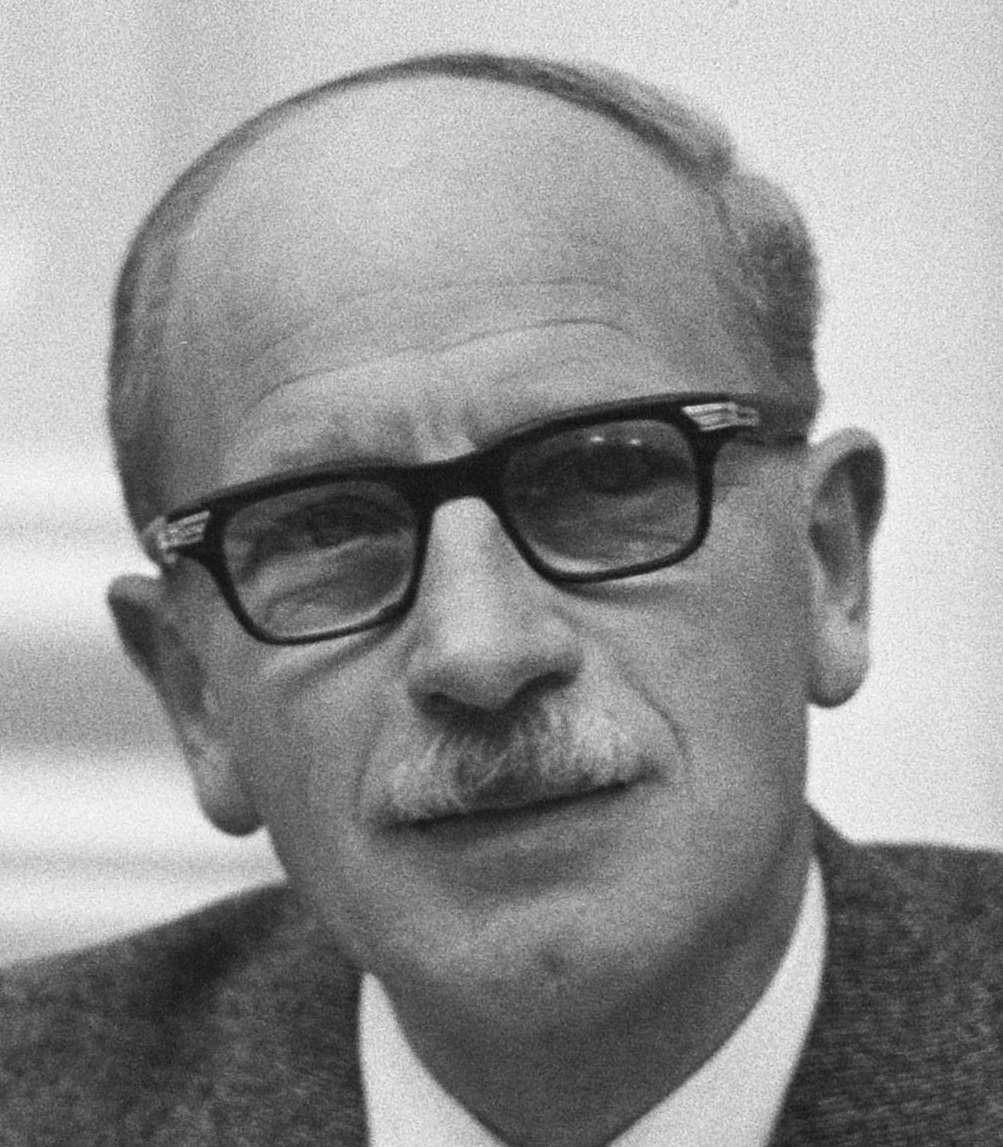
- Harry van Doorn in 1974

Minister of Culture, Recreation and Social Work
- In office 11 May 1973 – 19 December 1977
- Prime Minister: Joop den Uyl
- Preceded by: Piet Engels
- Succeeded by: Til Gardeniers-Berendsen

Member of the House of Representatives
- In office 3 July 1956 – 28 February 1968
- Parliamentary group: Catholic People's Party

Chairman of the Catholic People's Party
- In office 30 May 1953 – 23 June 1962
- Leader: Carl Romme (1953–1961); Wim de Kort (1961–1962)
- Preceded by: Jan Andriessen
- Succeeded by: Piet Aalberse Jr.

Personal details
- Born: Henri Willem van Doorn; 6 October 1915 The Hague, Netherlands
- Died: 12 January 1992 (aged 76) Amersfoort, Netherlands
- Party: Labour Party (from 1986)
- Other political affiliations: Political Party of Radicals (1968–1986); Catholic People's Party (1945–1968); Roman Catholic; State Party (1938–1945)
- Spouse: Cornelia de Jager (m. 1942)
- Children: 4 daughters and 2 sons
- Education: Leiden University (Bachelor of Laws, Master of Laws)
- Occupation: Politician · Civil servant · Jurist · Lawyer · Prosecutor · Judge · Researcher · Nonprofit director · Media administrator

Henri Willem "Harry" van Doorn (6 October 1915 – 12 January 1992) was a Dutch politician of the Catholic People's Party (KVP) and later co-founder of the Political Party of Radicals (PPR).

== Decorations ==
Honours
Ribbon bar	Honour	Country	Date
	Knight of the Order of the Holy Sepulchre	Holy See	10 December 1962
	Knight of the Order of the Netherlands Lion	Netherlands	30 April 1966
	Commander of the Order of Orange-Nassau	Netherlands	11 April 1978

Party political offices
Preceded by Jan Andriessen	Chairman of the Catholic; People's Party; 1953–1962	Succeeded by Piet Aalberse Jr.
Political offices
Preceded by Piet Engels	Minister of Culture, Recreation and Social Work; 1973–1977	Succeeded by Til Gardeniers-Berendsen
Non-profit organization positions
Unknown	Chairman of the Catholic Radio Broadcasting; 1961–1973	Unknown
