= Minus Polak =

Dutch politician (1928–2014)

Member of the Council of State
- In office 1 December 1985 – 1 August 1995

Member of the municipal council of Rotterdam
- In office 2 February 1978 – 28 November 1985

Member of the Senate
- In office 15 June 1976 – 20 September 1977

President of the Board of the Erasmus University Rotterdam
- In office 1 July 1974 – 1 February 1977

Member of the municipal council of Rotterdam
- In office 6 September 1966 – 24 June 1976

Alderman of Rotterdam
- In office 6 September 1966 – 18 April 1974

Personal details
- Born: Herminius Carl George Ludolf Polak; 12 May 1928 Rotterdam, Netherlands
- Died: 4 February 2014 (aged 85) Rotterdam, Netherlands
- Party: People's Party for Freedom and Democracy

Herminius Carl George Ludolf "Minus" Polak (12 May 1928 – 4 February 2014) was a Dutch lawyer, politician and judge. As a politician Polak served at different times as a member of the municipal council of Rotterdam, alderman of the same city and Senate of the Netherlands between 1966 and 1985 for the People's Party for Freedom and Democracy. As a judge he served first in the kanton court of Rotterdam and later in the Council of State of the Netherlands.

== Career ==
Born in Rotterdam on 12 May 1928, Polak's father was a university professor of business administration and rector at the Netherlands School of Economics (later Erasmus University Rotterdam), his mother was a doctor. Minus Polak studied Dutch law at the University of Amsterdam until 1953. He then returned to Rotterdam to work as a lawyer.

In 1966 he went into politics and stopped working as a lawyer. He was elected to the municipal council of Rotterdam, took office on 6 September and at the same time he was made alderman concerning infrastructure and public works. On 18 April 1974 he resigned his position as alderman after a conflict concerning funding for the airport of Zestienhoven. The municipal council held him responsible for the airport, but refused to provide him with the money to buy a firetruck. Polak felt that without the firetruck he could not provide the safety that was needed and therefore chose to resign. He did however continue on as a member of the municipal council for another two years, serving until 24 June 1976. Shortly after resigning as alderman, on 1 July 1974, he took up the position of President of the Board of the Erasmus University Rotterdam, the same university his father was once rector of. Two years into his presidency he was elected to the Senate, taking office on 15 June 1976. Polak would serve for just over one year as senator, until 20 September 1977.

On 1 February 1977 his presidency of the board of the university had ended and he took up his job as a lawyer once more. One year later, on 2 February 1978, he would also be elected to the municipal council of Rotterdam again. In 1983 Polak quit as a lawyer and became a judge in the kanton court of Rotterdam. In 1985 he ended both his function as a judge in the kanton court and as a member in the municipal council per 28 November. He then became a member of the Council of State of the Netherlands, the highest court of the Netherlands regarding decisions taken by the executive government. Polak would serve between 1 December 1985 and 1 August 1995.

Polak was made Officer of the Order of Orange-Nassau on 27 November 1985.

Polak was married and had four daughters. Near the end of his life he was nearly deaf. Polak died of myocardial infarction on 4 February 2014, aged 85.
