= Hans van der Louw =

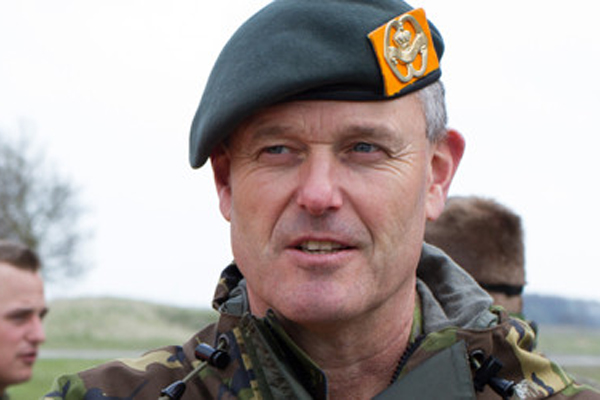
- Born: Amsterdam, North Holland, The Netherlands.
- Allegiance: The Netherlands
- Branch: Royal Netherlands Army
- Rank: Brigadier general
- Commands: 43 Gemechaniseerde (Mechanized) Brigade
- Awards: Legion of Merit - US

General Hans van der Louw is a two-star general in the Royal Netherlands Army and the former commander of 43 Gemechaniseerde (Mechanized) Brigade. From 1 January 2014 to 1 January 2018 he served as the Chief of the Military House of the King. As chief of the Military House of der Louw was also the adjutant-general of the King.
