= Fred Borgman =

Dutch politician (1946–1996)

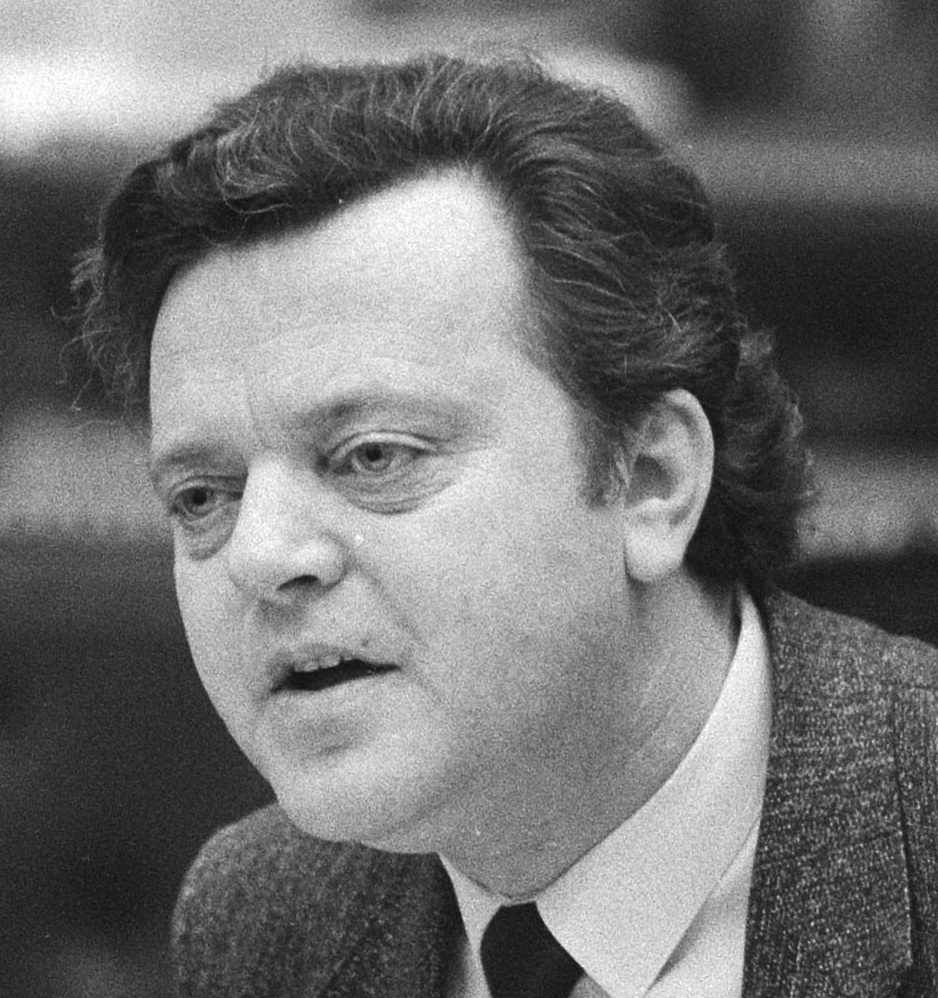

Mayor of Nijkerk
- In office 16 March 1990 – 1 December 1994
- Preceded by: Pieter van der Zaag
- Succeeded by: Bartele Vries

Member of the House of Representatives
- In office 11 November 1982 – 16 March 1990
- In office 9 September 1981 – 16 September 1982
- In office 5 April 1978 – 10 June 1981

Personal details
- Born: Freddie Borgman; 16 December 1946 Aalsmeer, Netherlands
- Died: 11 May 1996 (aged 49) Amersfoort, Netherlands
- Party: Christian Democratic Appeal (from 1980)
- Other political affiliations: Anti-Revolutionary Party (1964–1980)
- Spouse: Cobi Koningen (m. 1968–1996; his death)
- Children: 2 daughters and 1 son
- Occupation: Politician; Civil servant

Freddie "Fred" Borgman (16 December 1946 – 11 May 1996) was a Dutch politician of the Christian Democratic Appeal. He served as a Member of the House of Representatives between 1978 until 1990 when he became Mayor of Nijkerk, serving from 16 March 1990 until his resignation on 1 December 1994 because of an undescribed illness. Borgman died on 11 May 1996 following a battle with his undescribed illness at the age of 49.

== Biography ==
=== Early life ===
Freddie Borgman was born on 16 December 1946 in Aalsmeer in the Netherlands Province of North Holland in a Reformed family, the son of Jan Borgman and Sybranda Jacoba de Vries. After leaving secondary school, he worked at the Aalsmeer Flower Auction from 1966 until 1972 in the company of his father.

=== Politics ===
He was a member of the Aalsmeer municipal council, from 1 September 1970 until 1 September 1982. He was an alderman from 3 September 1974 until 1 April 1978 when he became a Member of the House of Representatives on 5 April 1978. He served in the House of Representatives until 16 March 1990, with two short interruptions in 1981 and 1982. He focused on matters of health and life issues and was secretary of the fraction from 1986 until 1990. On 16 March 1990 he became the Mayor of Nijkerk, serving until his resignation.

=== Family ===
He married Jacoba "Cobi" Koningen on 26 September 1968 in Aalsmeer, they had one son and two daughters, of which one died young from a traffic accident.

Political offices
Preceded by Pieter van der Zaag	Mayor of Nijkerk; 1990-1994	Succeeded by Bartele Vries
