= Ministry of Education, Culture and Science (Netherlands) =

Government ministry of the Netherlands

- Ministerie van Onderwijs, Cultuur en Wetenschappen

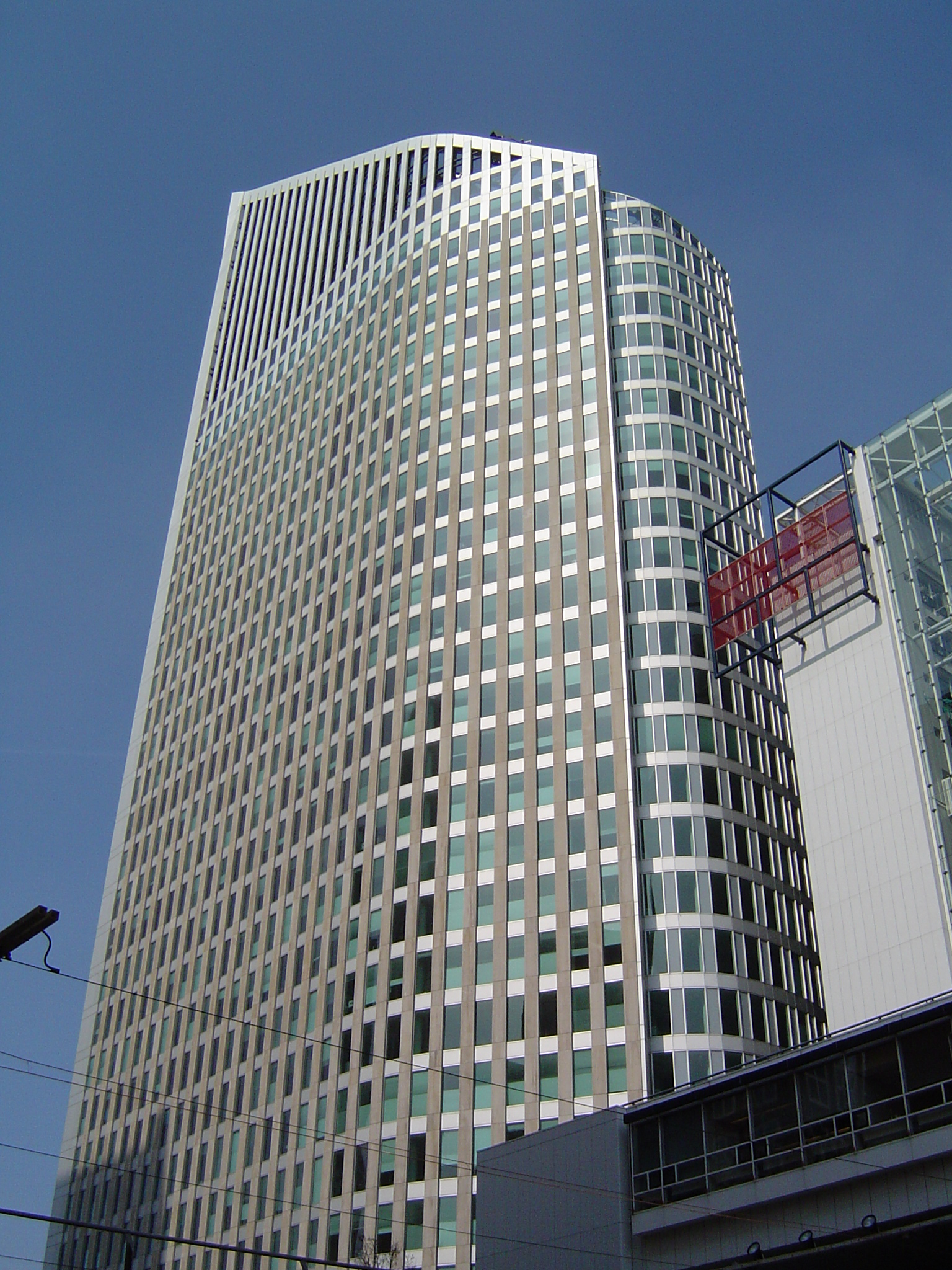
- Ministry of Education, Culture and Science

Department overview
- Formed: 9 September 1918; 108 years ago
- Jurisdiction: Kingdom of the Netherlands
- Headquarters: Rijnstraat 50, The Hague, Netherlands
- Annual budget: €38.5 billion (2018)
- Minister responsible: Rianne Letschert, Minister of Education, Culture and Science
- Deputy Ministers responsible: Judith Tielen, State Secretary for Primary and Secondary Education and Equal Opportunities
- Website: Ministry of Education, Culture and Science

The Ministry of Education, Culture and Science (Dutch: Ministerie van Onderwijs, Cultuur en Wetenschap; OCW) is the Dutch Ministry responsible for education, culture, science, research, gender equality and communications. The ministry was created in 1918 as the Ministry of Education, Arts and Sciences and had several name changes before it became the Education, Culture and Science in 1994. The Ministry is headed by the Minister of Education, Culture and Science, currently Rianne Letschert.

== Responsibilities ==
The mission of the ministry is to "work for a smart, able and creative Netherlands". The ministry is responsible for three fields of policy:

- The whole of education, from kindergarten, via primary education and secondary education to vocational training and higher education;
- Culture, arts and the public broadcasting;
- Science and innovation.

== Organisation ==
The ministry is currently headed by two ministers and one state secretary. The ministry's main office is located in the Hoftoren, the tallest building of The Hague. The ministry has around 2500 civil servants. The civil service is headed by a secretary general and a deputy secretary general, who head a system of three directorates general:

- Primary and Secondary Education;
- Higher and Vocational Education, Science and Emancipation;
- and Culture and Media.

It has several autonomous agencies:

- Central Financial Institution, which is responsible for the execution of financial policies:
- Institute Collection Netherlands;
- the Nationaal Archief;
- Government Service for Archeology, Cultural Landscape and Monuments;
- Education Inspection;
- Cultural Conservation Inspection;
- Council for Science and Technology; Policy;
- Council for Education;
- and the Council for Culture.

== History ==
The predecessor of the ministry, the Ministry of Education, Arts and Sciences was founded in 1918, as it became autonomous from the Ministry of the Interior. It was founded as a result of the resolution of the school struggle, the conflict about the equalisation of the finance for religious and public schools. During the German occupation the ministry was renamed Department for Education, Sciences and Cultural Conservation and a separate Department for Propaganda and Arts. In 1965 the department for arts was integrated into the new Ministry of Culture, Recreation and Social Work. In 1982 this cultural department was integrated into the Ministry of Health. In 1996 cultural department returned to the Ministry of Education.

== See also ==
- List of ministers of education of the Netherlands
