= Ministry of Housing and Spatial Planning =

Dutch government ministry

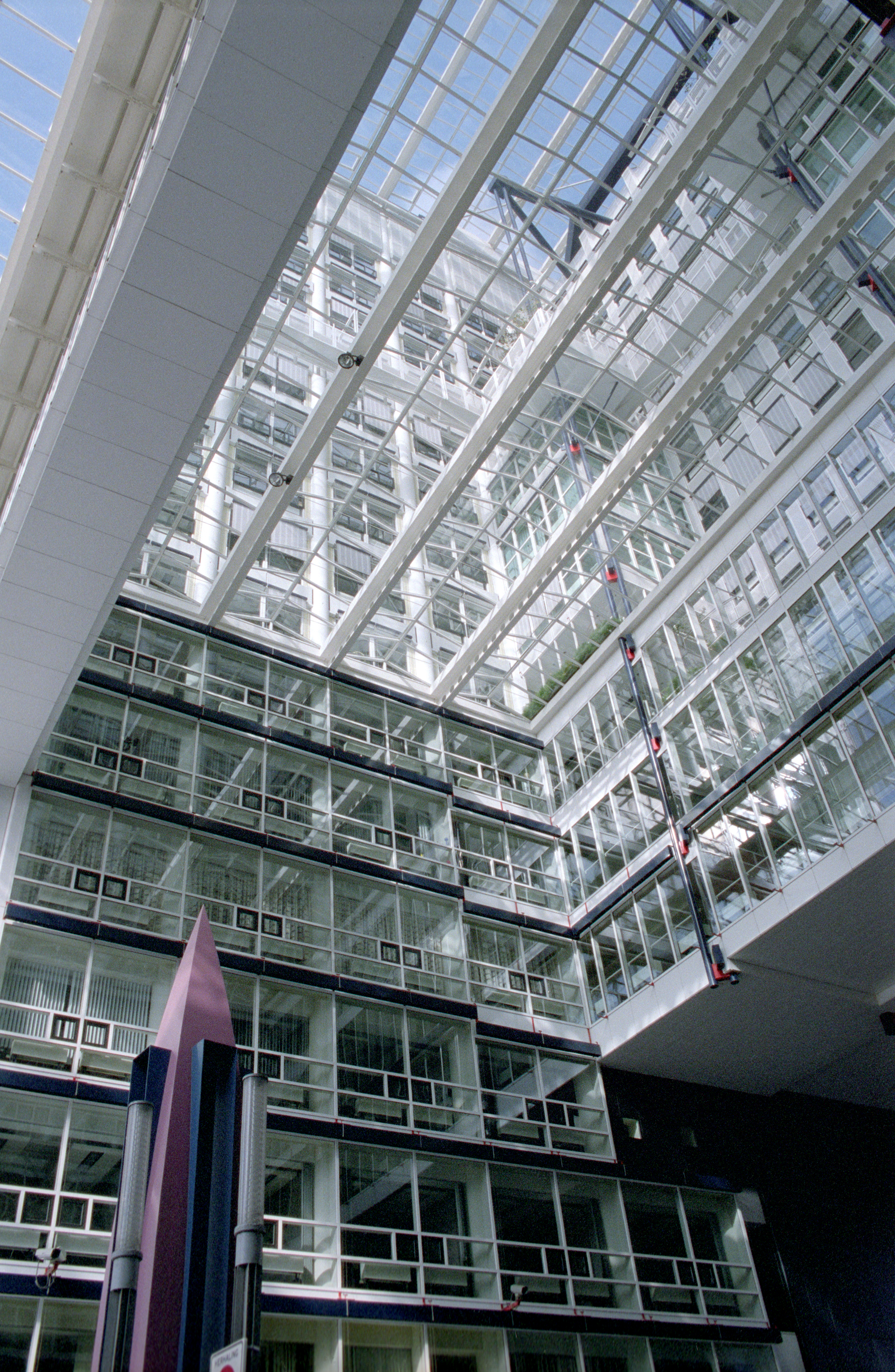
Former ministry building

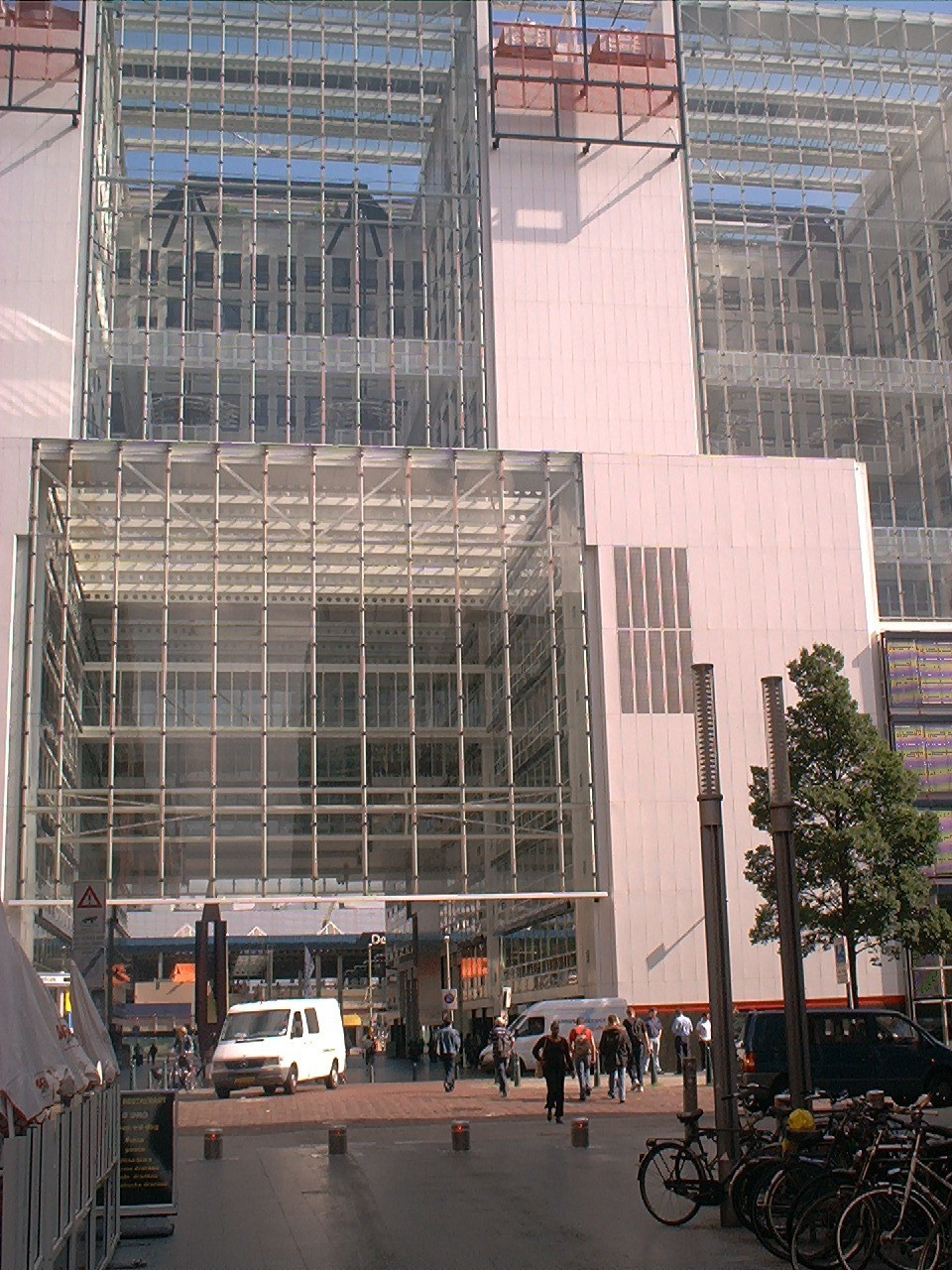
Former ministry building

The Ministry of Housing and Spatial Planning (Dutch: Ministerie van Volkshuisvesting and Ruimtelijke Ordening or VRO) is a Dutch government ministry. It was re-established in 2024 after having been disbanded in 2010. The current minister is Mona Keijzer.

== History ==
The Ministry of Housing and Spatial Planning was established as the ministry of Reconstruction and Public Housing (Dutch: Wederopbouw en Volkshuisvesting) in 1947, to coordinate the reconstruction of the Netherlands after the Second World War. Its main goal in this period was to build enough housing. In 1958 the ministry was renamed Public Housing and Construction Industry (Dutch: Volkshuisvesting en Bouwnijverheid).

In the 1965 the ministry was renamed Public Housing and Spatial Planning (Dutch: Volkshuisvesting en Ruimtelijke Ordening). Spatial planning and land management became more important. The high level of population growth in the densely populated Netherlands made centralized coordination of land use necessary. The ministry began to publish coordinate the land use policies of provinces and municipalities. Urban renewal also became an important issue for the ministry.

In 1982 the ministry was renamed Housing, Spatial Planning and the Environment. The environment was previously part of the portfolio of the Ministry of Health, Welfare and Sport. With rising environmental consciousness the environment became the most important issue for the ministry. The ministry also bore responsibility for international environmental policy. The Netherlands Environmental Assessment Agency was part of the ministry starting in 2006. The ministry was merged with the Ministry of Transport, Public Works and Water Management into the new Ministry of Infrastructure and the Environment on 14 October 2010.

The Ministry of Housing and Spatial Planning was re-established on 2 July 2024, when the Schoof cabinet was sworn in. It was spun off from the Ministry of the Interior and Kingdom Relations. The coalition agreement included budget cuts to the civil service, and it was decided that the new ministry would remain located in an office building shared with the Ministry of the Interior and Kingdom Relations. The ministry's responsibilities mostly coincide with those previously overseen by the Minister for Housing and Spatial Planning, a minister without portfolio.

== See also ==
- List of ministers of housing of the Netherlands
