= Netherlands Environmental Assessment Agency =

Dutch government research institute

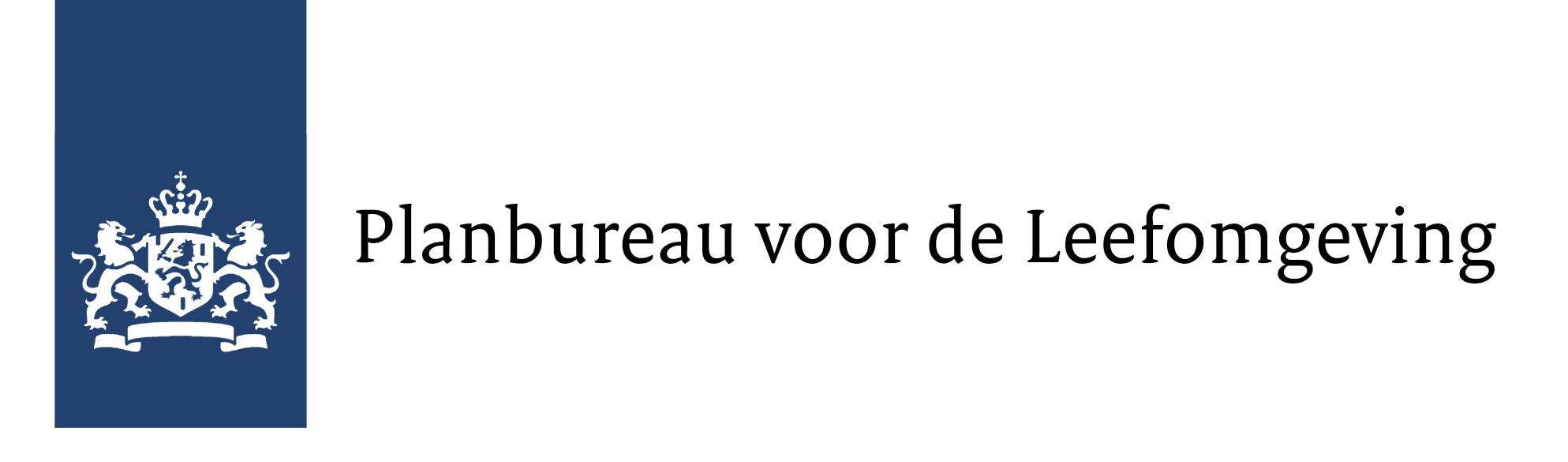

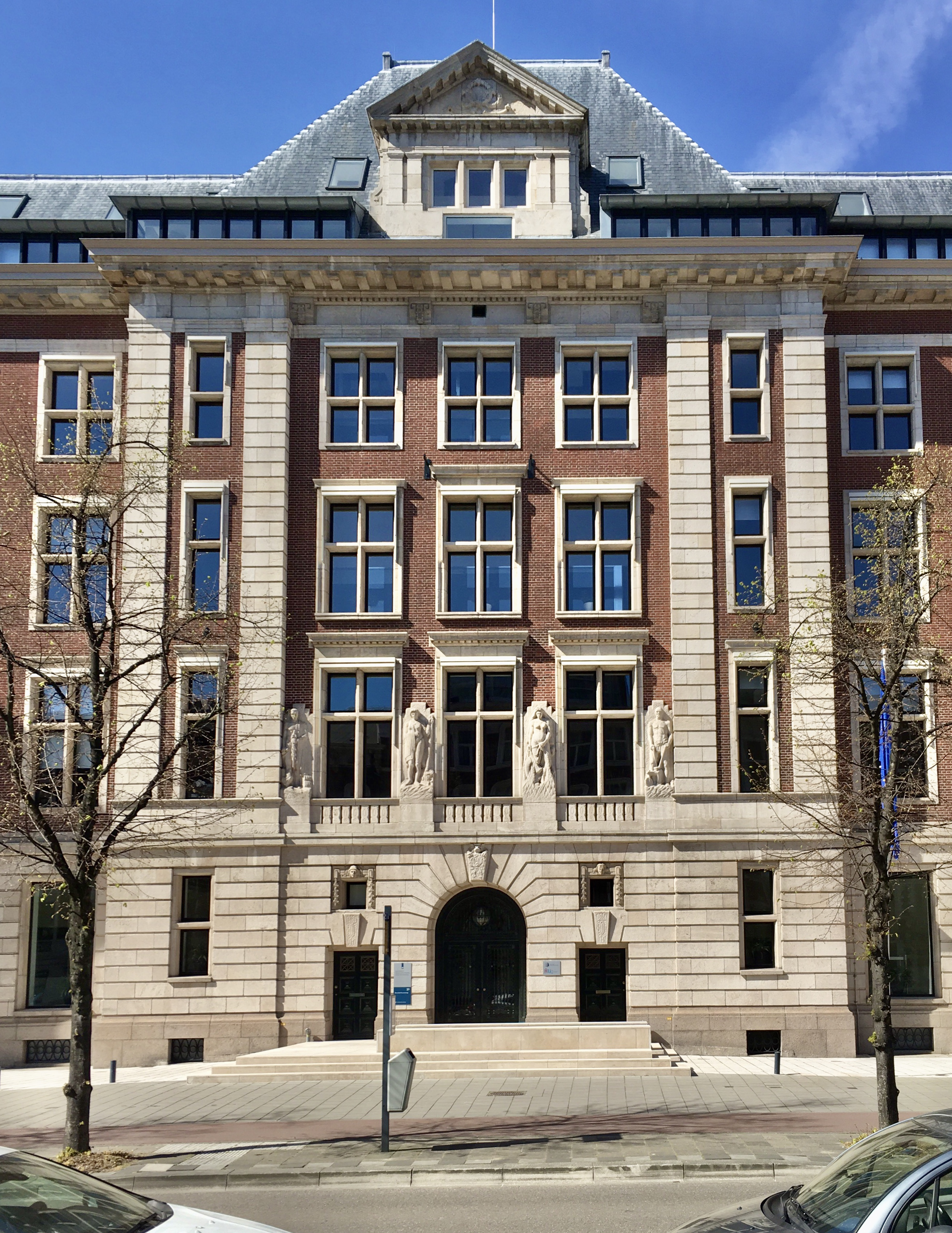

Agency overview
- Formed: May 15, 2008
- Preceding agency: Netherlands Institute for Spatial Research (RPB) and Netherlands Environmental Agency (MNP)
- Jurisdiction: Ministry of Infrastructure and Water Management
- Headquarters: Bezuidenhoutseweg 30, The Hague, Netherlands
- Employees: 250
- Agency executive: Marko Hekkert (as of January 1, 2023)
- Website: https://www.pbl.nl

The Netherlands Environmental Assessment Agency (Dutch: Planbureau voor de Leefomgeving - abbr. PBL) is a Dutch research institute that advises the Dutch government on environmental policy and regional planning issues. It operates as an autonomous entity within the Dutch national government, specifically under the Ministry of Infrastructure and Water Management (IenW). While primarily associated with IenW, PBL's expertise is also sought by other government departments, including the Ministry of Economic Affairs, the Ministry of the Interior and Kingdom Relations, the Ministry of Agriculture, Fisheries, Food Security and Nature, and the Ministry of Foreign Affairs. The research fields include sustainable development, energy and climate change, biodiversity, transport, land use, and air quality. It is one of three applied policy research institutes of the Dutch government, the other two being Bureau for Economic Policy Analysis (CPB), and The Netherlands Institute for Social Research (SCP). Since January 2023 Marko Hekkert is director of the Netherlands Environmental Assessment Agency.

== History ==
The PBL was created on May 15, 2008, by merging the Netherlands Environmental Agency (Dutch: Milieu- en Natuurplanbureau) (MNP) with the Netherlands Institute for Spatial Research (Dutch: Ruimtelijk Planbureau) (RPB). The English name for the new organization was borrowed from the MNP, which was part of the Netherlands National Institute for Public Health and the Environment (RIVM) until May 1, 2005. It is currently an agency of the Dutch Ministry of Infrastructure and the Environment (IenW, Ministerie van Infrastructuur en Waterstaat).

The Netherlands Environmental Assessment Agency is located in The Hague and employs approximately 250 people.

The agency publishes the GLOBIO Model, designed to quantify human impacts on biodiversity at large (regional to global) scales.

== Core tasks ==
The primary functions of the PBL Netherlands Environmental Assessment Agency encompass:

- Conducting assessments and reporting on the current state of environmental, ecological, and spatial attributes, as well as appraising the effectiveness of related policy measures.
- Investigating potential social developments that may impact environmental, ecological, and spatial conditions, and appraising future policy directions.
- Bringing to the forefront societal challenges that could affect environmental, ecological, and spatial quality for public discourse.
- Proposing strategic approaches to fulfill governmental goals in environmental protection, nature conservation, and spatial planning sectors.

== See also ==
- Environment of the Netherlands
- National Institute for Public Health and the Environment
- Climate change in the Netherlands
