= Act of Guarantee =

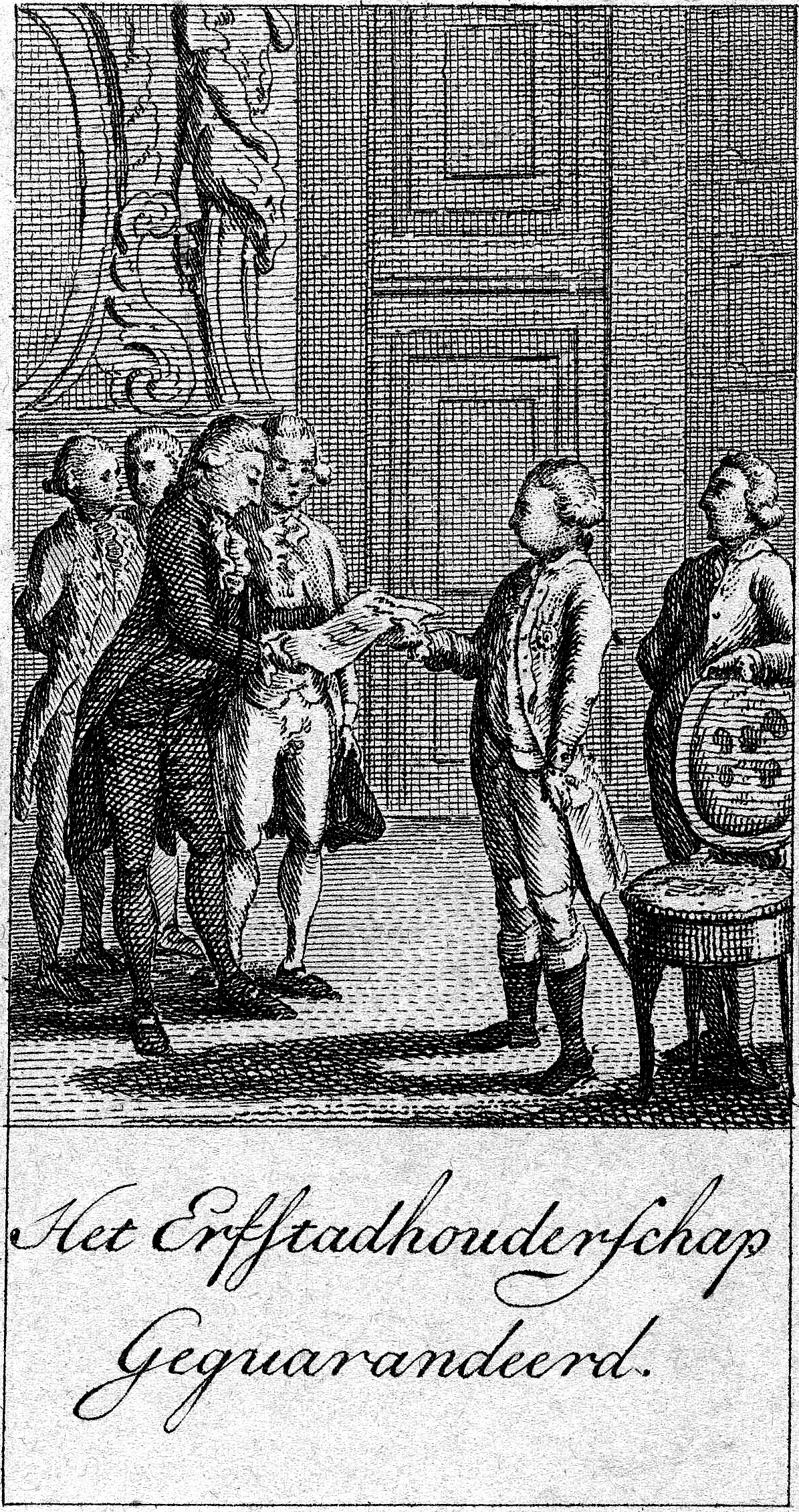
A States General delegation presents the Act of Guarantee to stadtholder William V at the Huis ten Bosch palace on 10 July 1788. Anonymous engraving, Rijksmuseum collection.

The Act of Guarantee (Dutch: Akte van Garantie) of the hereditary stadtholderate was a document from 1788, in which the seven provinces of the States General and the representative of Drenthe declared, amongst other things, that the admiralty and captain-generalship were hereditary, and together with the hereditary stadtholderate would henceforth be an integrated part of the constitution of the Dutch Republic. Moreover, members of the House of Orange-Nassau would have the exclusive privilege to hold the office. The Act was in force until the Batavian Republic was established in 1795.

== Background ==
In the second half of the 18th century, there were tensions all over Europe because of growing dissatisfaction against the ruling upper class. William V, Prince of Orange, succeeded his father as hereditary stadtholder of the United Netherlands in 1751, but the –otherwise intelligent– prince showed weak leadership, and was heavily influenced from abroad. Especially the Patriots, influenced by Enlightenment thought and the American Revolution, opposed his policies, and sought to reform the state and legal system. After the Netherlands got into war with Britain in 1780, criticism of the stadtholderian regime's functioning steadily increased, and the influence and prestige of the prince gradually crumbled. Tensions between Orangists and Patriots peaked, both parties started arming themselves and forming exercitiegenootschappen, and the Republic teetered on the brink of civil war.

In subsequent years, violent incidents occurred between supporters of both camps, leading to lethal clashes as well. Patriot politicians managed to obtain positions of executive power in a great many cities, sometimes by the new system of democratic elections. This angered the Orangists, who together with the stadtholder saw their influence, and the wealth resulting from it, waning. Early September 1785, William V was deprived of his command of the garrison in The Hague, making him feel insecure. Two weeks later, he left for Friesland, where his wife and children had already gone to commemorate the University of Franeker. Thereafter, the stadtholder travelled via Groningen to Het Loo Palace near Apeldoorn. He even intended to return to his ancestral court in Dillenburg, but his wife dissuaded him, and they set up their residence at the Valkhof in Nijmegen. A return to the Binnenhof in The Hague seemed impossible, however.

In September 1786, Patriots under Herman Willem Daendels briefly occupied the towns of Hattem and Elburg, but were soon driven out by stadtholderian forces. Although these clashes were militarily insignificant, their political impact was great: they sharpened the existing divisions and led to a further militarisation of the conflict. A much more serious confrontation took place at the Battle of Jutphaas (9 May 1787); although it was but a small defeat for the prince of Orange, it nevertheless confirmed that he was no longer able to control the country's internal affairs through force. Moreover, a few days later Amsterdam came firmly into Patriot hands when the Orangist Bijltjesoproer was put down on 30 May.

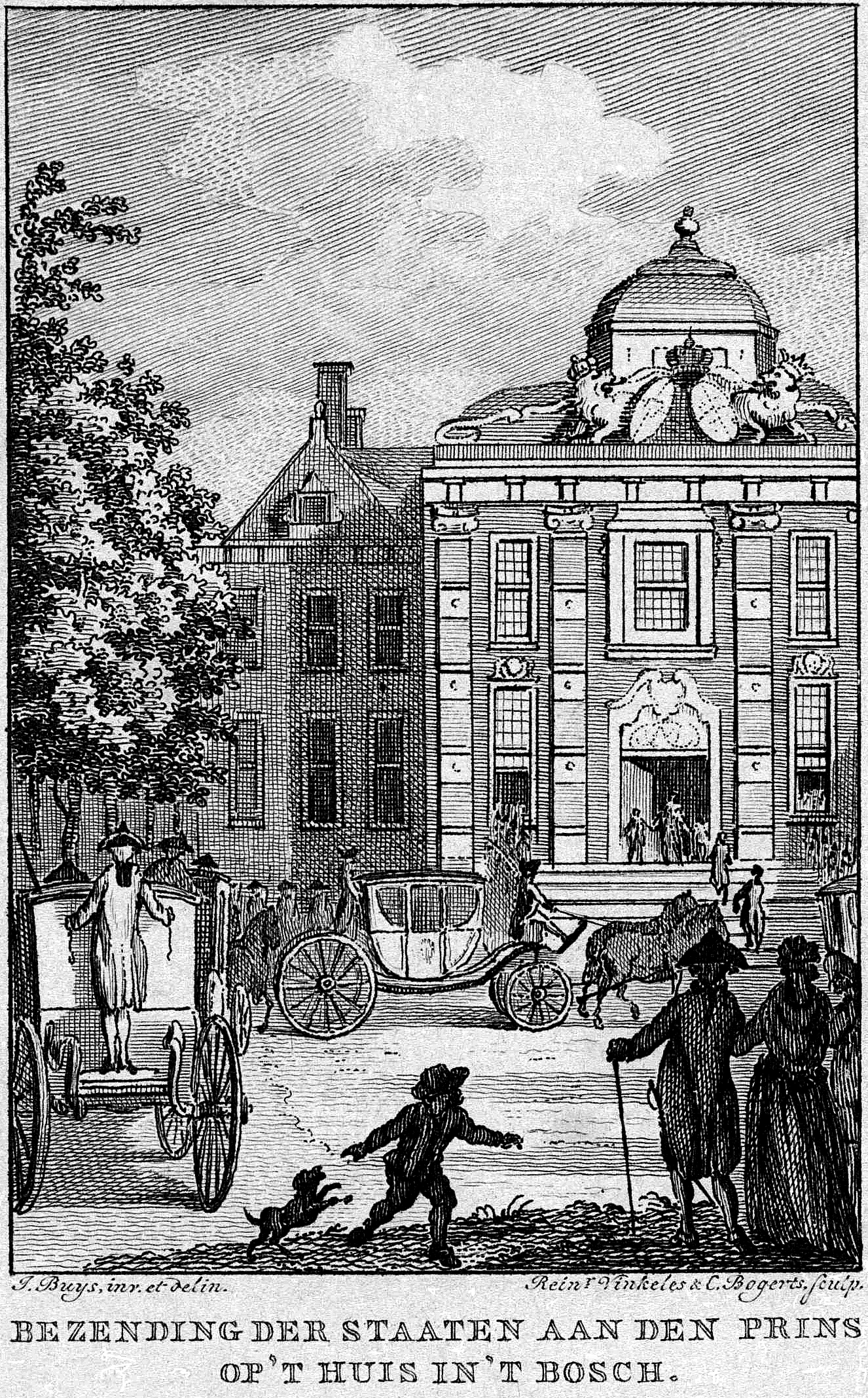
The States General delegation arrives at Huis ten Bosch palace, 10 July 1788. Engraving by Reinier Vinkeles, Rijksmuseum collection.

== Creation ==
When the stadtholder's wife, Wilhelmina of Prussia, was arrested by a Patriot militia at Goejanverwellesluis on 28 June 1787, she requested her brother King Frederick William II of Prussia to avenge her humiliation. In response, a large Prussian army invaded the Netherlands in September 1787, and restored William V in his functions and privileges. The Patriots were then cleansed from all political positions and persecuted (many fled to France to escape persecution), clearing the way for Orangists to further increase William's position. They drafted the Act of Guarantee, stipulating that the hereditary stadtholderate, as well as the functions of captain-general (commander of the Dutch States Army) and admiral-general (commander of the Dutch fleet), would be forever granted to the House of Orange-Nassau.

After negotiations between Wilhelmina and the British and Prussian envoys, Laurens Pieter van de Spiegel was appointed Grand Pensionary of Holland. He tried to restore and reinforce the stadtholderian regime, and opposed any democratic innovation. Furthermore, Van de Spiegel tried to restore the Republic's prestige, and conduct several careful reforms, but almost all of them failed, partly due to the fact that the Orange restoration was aimed at keeping the ancien régime in place, and did not leave any room for reform. Van de Spiegel's most important achievement was therefore the draft and ratification of the Act of Guarantee, which had a very conservative and reactionary stamp.

== The Act and treaties ==
Prussia and Britain actively intervened in the restoration to ensure the continued survival of the stadholderate. Both nations sought to secure the Dutch Republic as an ally and prevent it from entering into an alliance with France or the United States. Finally, Prussia wished to secure Dutch military support in case of an outbreak of war with Russia or Austria, who had allied together in 1781 and started conquering Ottoman territories from 1787 onwards. On 15 April 1788, Britain and the Republic first signed a defensive pact in The Hague, in which the former swore to guarantee the hereditary stadtholderate. The same day around the same hour, the United Provinces and Prussia concluded a similar treaty in Berlin. In the night of 12–13 June, the Prussian king and envoy and the British envoy jointly drafted a provisional alliance between Prussia and Britain at Het Loo Palace, also including an act of guarantee concerning the constitution of the Dutch Republic. Van de Spiegel did not participate in the negotiations, but did attend its signing.

On 3 July 1788, William V, accompanied by his sons prince William and prince Frederick, received a delegation of the States General at Huis ten Bosch Palace. In a formal ceremony, it solemnly granted him the Act of Guarantee. The Act was henceforth considered to be an unalienable part of the constitution of the Dutch Republic, which thereby began to look more and more like a unitary state led by an absolutist monarch. On 13 August 1788, a definitive alliance, the Triple Alliance, was signed between Britain, Prussia and the Dutch Republic, in which the British and Prussians promied to preserve the stadtholderate. Van de Spiegel helped with drafting the treaty, which brought the Republic into the British and Prussian sphere of influence.

== Burning the Act ==
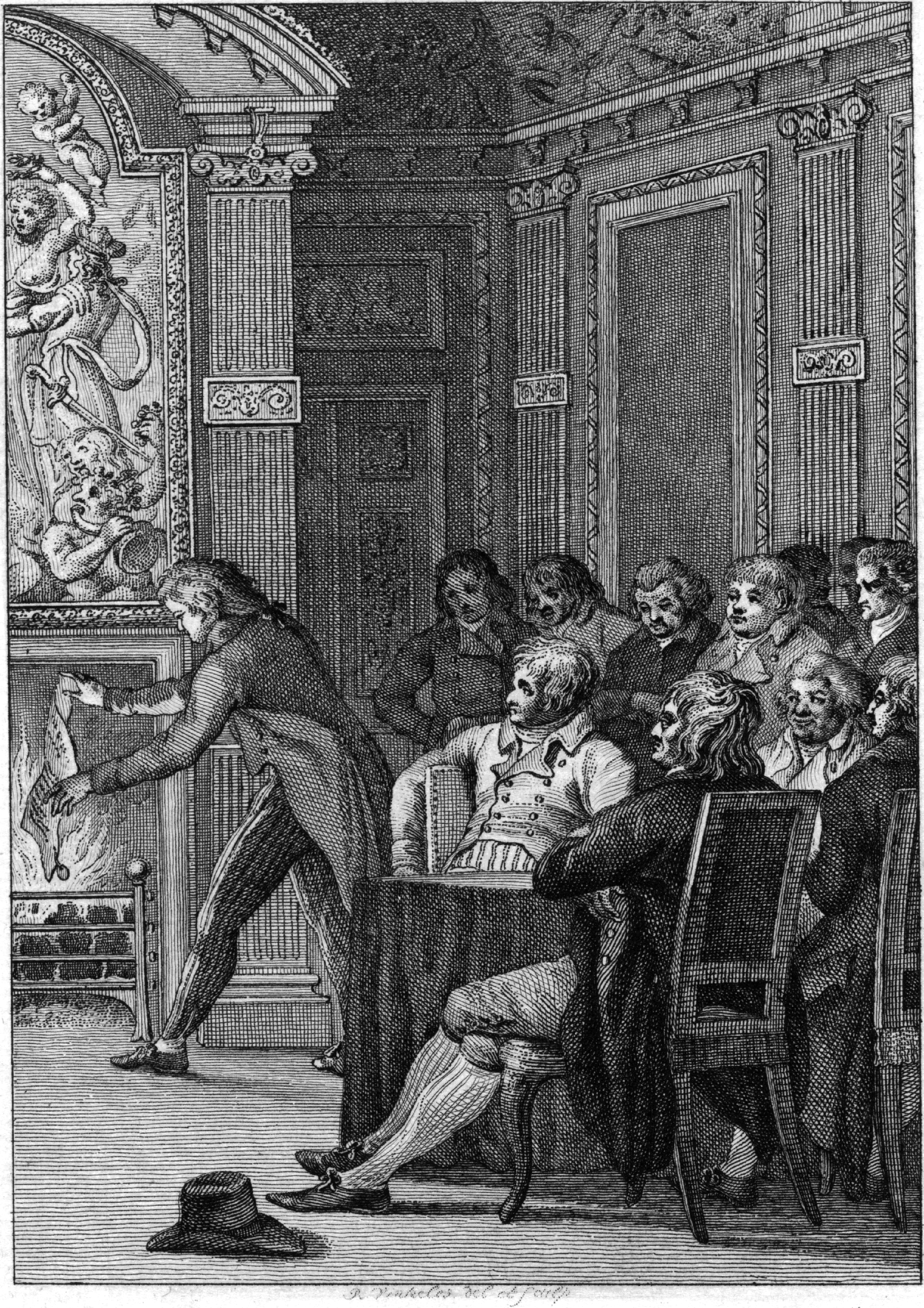
Daniël van Laer burning the Act of Guarantee (16 February 1795). Engraving by Reinier Vinkeles (1803), Rijksmuseum collection.

The Act of Guarantee has been in force for seven years, but in the end, William's position in the Netherlands became untenable. After the French Republican invasion in late 1794, the outbreak of the pro-French Batavian Revolution in Amsterdam forced him and his family to flee to England in January 1795. One of the first acts of the Provisional Representatives of the People of Holland was abolishing the offices of (hereditary) stadtholder, captain-general and admiral-general. Next, the original Act of Guarantee was burnt on 16 February 1795 in a fireplace at the Binnenhof by provisional representative Daniël van Laer.

== See also ==
- Act of Seclusion
- First Stadtholderless Period
- Second Stadtholderless Period
- Joan Derk van der Capellen tot den Pol
- Kew Letters
- Oranienstein Letters

== Literature ==
- Inventaris van de archieven van stadhouder Willem V (1745-1808) en de Hofcommissie van Willem IV (1732-1794), Volumes 1732-1794; B. Woelderink, H. J. de Muij-Fleurke; Uitgeverij Verloren, 2005; ISBN 9065508902 ISBN 9789065508904
- Handboek der algemeene geschiedenis; J.B. Wolters; Groningen, 1888 (6th, revised edition)
