= Bijltjesoproer =

- Part of the Patriot era
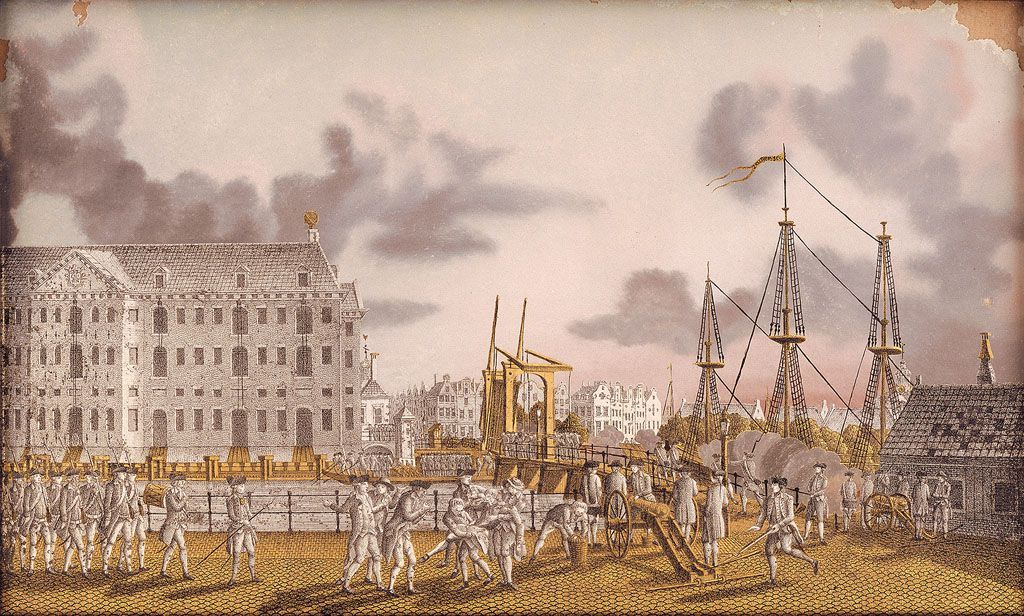
- Painting showing Patriots ready with cannons in the foreground. The Kattenburgers have hoisted the Kattenburg Bridge, however, and thus are able to hold off the Patriots for some time.
Date	30 May 1787
Location	Kattenburg, Amsterdam, Dutch Republic
Result	Patriot victory

Belligerents
(Dutch Republic) Patriots	(Dutch Republic) Orangists

Het Bijltjesoproer ("Hatchet Riot") or Kattenburgoproer ("Kattenburg Riot") of 30 May 1787 was an uprising of Dutch Orangist ship carpenters in the Kattenburg quarter of Amsterdam against the city's Patriot regenten. These labourers were nicknamed "Bijltjes" ("Hatchets", their most important tool); hence the name Bijltjesoproer.

Towards the end of the 18th century, tensions rose between Orangists, who sought to preserve the historic position of the House of Orange, and Patriots, who desired a democratic republic and the abolition of medieval privileges and aristocracy. The Amsterdam ship carpenters held strong Orangist convictions, as did many other ordinary citizens. On the other hand, the Patriot movement was gaining strength since 1780, started arming themselves in 1783 and eventually seized control in several cities throughout the Netherlands, such as Utrecht. The country was on the brink of civil war, and in September 1786 two brief skirmishes took place in the towns of Hattem and Elburg when they were occupied by Patriots and quickly retaken by troops loyal to stadtholder William V, Prince of Orange. On 9 May 1787, the first pitched battle occurred near Jutphaas in the province of Utrecht, resulting in a Patriot victory. This rapidly escalated tensions between the two factions across the Republic.

A few weeks later, the Kattenburg Orangists rose against the regenten of Amsterdam, who held predominantly Patriot sympathies at the time. The day on which this revolt was violently repressed, has become known as Bijltjesdag ("Hatchet Day"). Nowadays, this term is common in the Netherlands to refer to the moment of retribution after a time of oppression.

The alternative name Kattenburgoproer refers to Kattenburg, the Amsterdam neighbourhood where the shipyards were located. According to Etymologisch Woordenboek van het Nederlands, the ship carpenters were not the only ones rising in rebellion, but "the exceptionally pro-Orange inhabitants of Kattenburg" in general.

== See also ==
- Accountability Day
- Battle of Jutphaas
- Goejanverwellesluis
- Prussian invasion of Holland
