= Hans Grosheide =

Dutch politician (1930–2022)

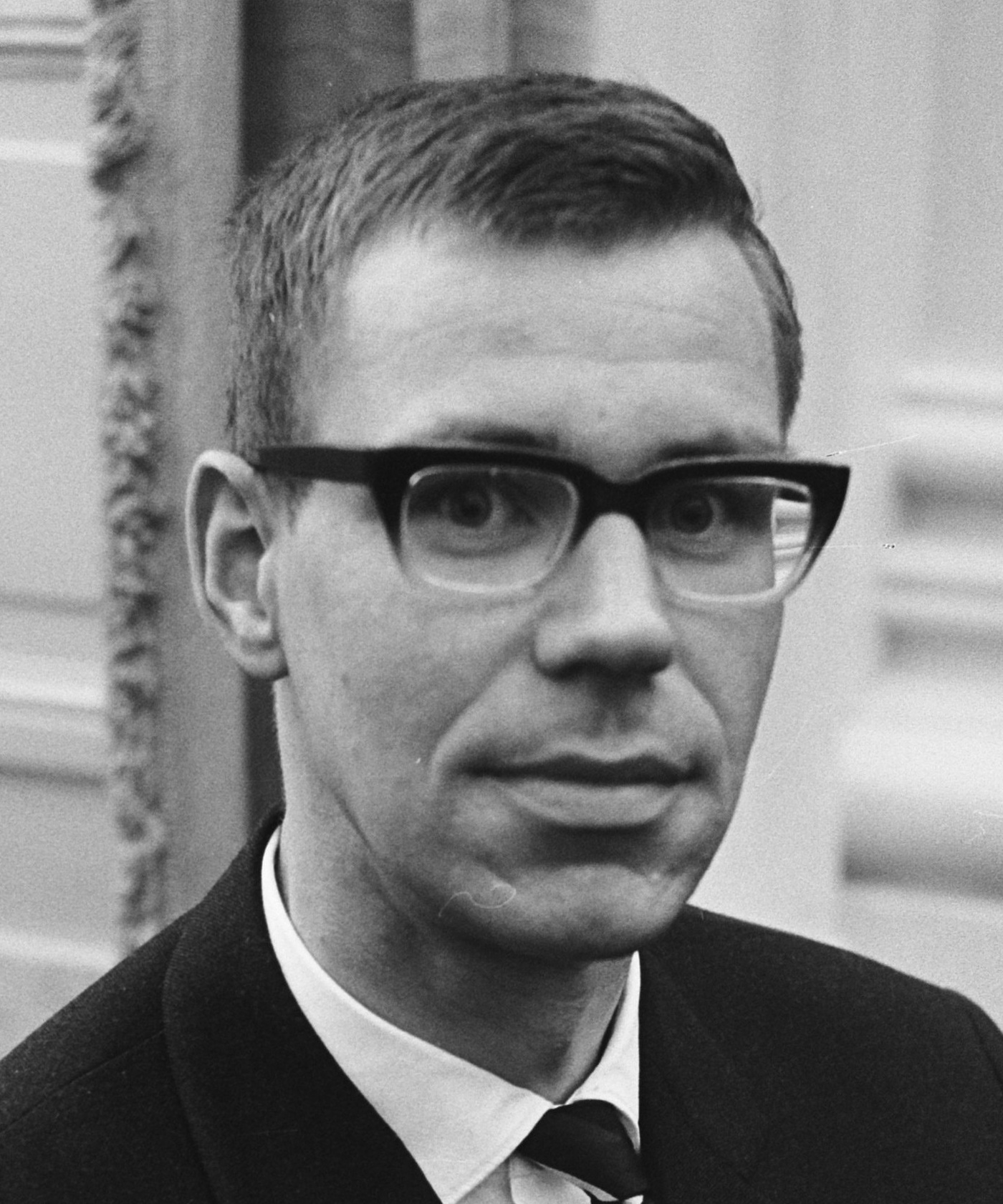
- Grosheide in 1963

Extraordinary Member of the Council of State
- In office 1 February 1993 – 1 September 2000
- Vice President: Willem Scholten (1993–1997); Herman Tjeenk Willink (1997–2000)

Mayor of Rijswijk
- In office 1 February 1974 – 1 July 1978
- Preceded by: Archibald Bogaardt
- Succeeded by: Henk Zeevalking

State Secretary for Justice
- In office 28 July 1971 – 11 May 1973
- Prime Minister: Barend Biesheuvel
- Preceded by: Klaas Wiersma
- Succeeded by: Jan Glastra van Loon

Member of the House of Representatives
- In office 11 May 1971 – 28 July 1971
- Parliamentary group: Anti-Revolutionary Party

State Secretary for Education and Sciences
- In office 14 April 1965 – 6 July 1971
- Prime Minister: See list: Jo Cals (1965–1966) Jelle Zijlstra (1966–1967) Piet de Jong (1967–1971)
- Preceded by: Himself as State Secretary for Education, Culture and Sciences
- Succeeded by: Kees Schelfhout

State Secretary for Education, Arts and Sciences
- In office 3 September 1963 – 14 April 1965 Serving with Louis van de Laar
- Prime Minister: Victor Marijnen
- Preceded by: Harry Janssen; Ynso Scholten
- Succeeded by: Himself as State Secretary for Education and Sciences

Personal details
- Born: Johan Hendrik Grosheide; 6 August 1930 Amsterdam, Netherlands
- Died: 18 December 2022 (aged 92) The Hague, Netherlands
- Party: Christian Democratic Appeal (from 1980)
- Other political affiliations: Anti-Revolutionary Party (until 1980)
- Relations: Daniël Grosheide (brother); Wim Schut (uncle)
- Education: Free University Amsterdam (Bachelor of Laws, Master of Laws)
- Occupation: Politician · civil servant · Jurist · Corporate director · Nonprofit director · Education administrator · Teacher · Editor · Author

Johan Hendrik "Hans" Grosheide (6 August 1930 – 18 December 2022) was a Dutch politician of the defunct Anti-Revolutionary Party (ARP) and later the Christian Democratic Appeal (CDA) party and jurist.

== Biography ==
Grosheide attended a Gymnasium in Amsterdam from April 1943 until May 1949 and applied at the Free University Amsterdam in June 1949 majoring in Law and obtaining a Bachelor of Laws degree in July 1951 before graduating with a Master of Laws degree in April 1954. Grosheide worked as a teacher and education administrator for Protestant Reformed special schools from November 1954 until September 1963. Grosheide served on the Anti-Revolutionary Party Executive Board from February 1958 until September 1963.

After the election of 1963 Grosheide was appointed State Secretary for Education, Arts and Sciences in the Cabinet Marijnen, taking office on 3 September 1963. The Cabinet Marijnen fell on 27 February 1965 after a disagreement in the coalition about reforms to the public broadcasting system and continued to serve in a demissionary capacity until the cabinet formation of 1965 when it was replaced by the Cabinet Cals on 14 April 1965 with Grosheide continuing as State Secretary for Education and Sciences, taking office on 14 April 1965. The Cabinet Cals fell on 14 October 1966 after the Leader of the Catholic People's Party Norbert Schmelzer had proposed a motion that called for a stronger austerity policy to further reduce the deficit was seen as an indirect motion of no confidence and continued to serve in a demissionary capacity until the cabinet formation of 1966 when it was replaced by the caretaker Cabinet Zijlstra with Grosheide continuing as State Secretary for Education and Sciences, taking office on 22 November 1966. After the election of 1967 Grosheide remained State Secretary for Education and Sciences in the Cabinet De Jong, taking office on 5 April 1967. Grosheide was elected as a Member of the House of Representatives after the election of 1971, taking office on 11 May 1971. Following the cabinet formation of 1971 Grosheide was appointed State Secretary for Justice in the Cabinet Biesheuvel I, taking office on 28 July 1971. The Cabinet Biesheuvel I fell just one year later on 19 July 1972 after the Democratic Socialists '70 (DS'70) retracted their support following their dissatisfaction with the proposed budget memorandum to further reduce the deficit and continued to serve in a demissionary capacity until the first cabinet formation of 1972 when it was replaced by the caretaker Cabinet Biesheuvel II with Grosheide continuing as State Secretary for Justice, taking office on 9 August 1972. In August 1972 Grosheide announced that he wouldn't stand for the election of 1972. The Cabinet Biesheuvel II was replaced by the Cabinet Den Uyl following the cabinet formation of 1973 on 11 May 1973.

Grosheide remained active in national politics, in January 1974 he was nominated as Mayor of Rijswijk, taking office on 1 February 1974. Grosheide also worked as the director of the Abraham Kuyper Foundation from 1 July 1974 until 1 August 1979 and served again on the Anti-Revolutionary Party Executive Board from August 1974 until October 1980. In June 1978 Grosheide was appointed Director-General of the Custodial Institutions Agency of the Ministry of Justice, he resigned as Mayor the same day he was installed as Director-General on 1 July 1978. Grosheide was appointed Special Coordinator for European Immigration an Asylum and Deputy Secretary-General of the Ministry of Justice on 1 January 1991. In January 1993 Grosheide was nominated as Extraordinary Member of the Council of State, he resigned as a Special Coordinator the day he was installed as a Member of the Council of State, serving from 1 February 1993 until 1 September 2000.

Grosheide was known for his abilities as a manager and policy wonk. Grosheide continued to comment on political affairs until his retirement in 2012 and holds the distinction as the longest-serving State Secretary for Education with 7 years, 306 days and the fifth youngest-serving cabinet member after World War II with 33 years, 28 days.

Grosheide died on 18 December 2022, at the age of 92.

== Decorations ==
Honours
Ribbon bar	Honour	Country	Date	Comment
	Knight of the Order of the Holy Sepulchre	Holy See	18 Augustus 1966	
	Commander of the Order of the Netherlands Lion	Netherlands	8 June 1973	
	Grand Officer of the Order of Orange-Nassau	Netherlands	1 September 2000	Elevated from Officer (30 April 1979)

Political offices
Preceded by Harry Janssen; Ynso Scholten	State Secretary for Education, Arts and Sciences; 1963–1965; With: Louis van de Laar	Succeeded by Himself as State Secretary for Education and Sciences
Preceded by Himself as State Secretary for Education, Culture and Sciences	State Secretary for Education and Sciences; 1965–1971	Succeeded by Kees Schelfhout
Preceded by Klaas Wiersma	State Secretary for Justice; 1971–1973	Succeeded by Jan Glastra van Loon
Preceded by Archibald Bogaardt	Mayor of Rijswijk; 1974–1978	Succeeded by Henk Zeevalking
Civic offices
Preceded by Unknown	Director-General of the Custodial Institutions Agency of the Ministry of Justice; 1978–1991	Succeeded by Unknown
Preceded by Unknown	Deputy Secretary-General of the Ministry of Justice; 1991–1993	Succeeded by Unknown
