= Ad Hermes =

Dutch politician (1929–2002)

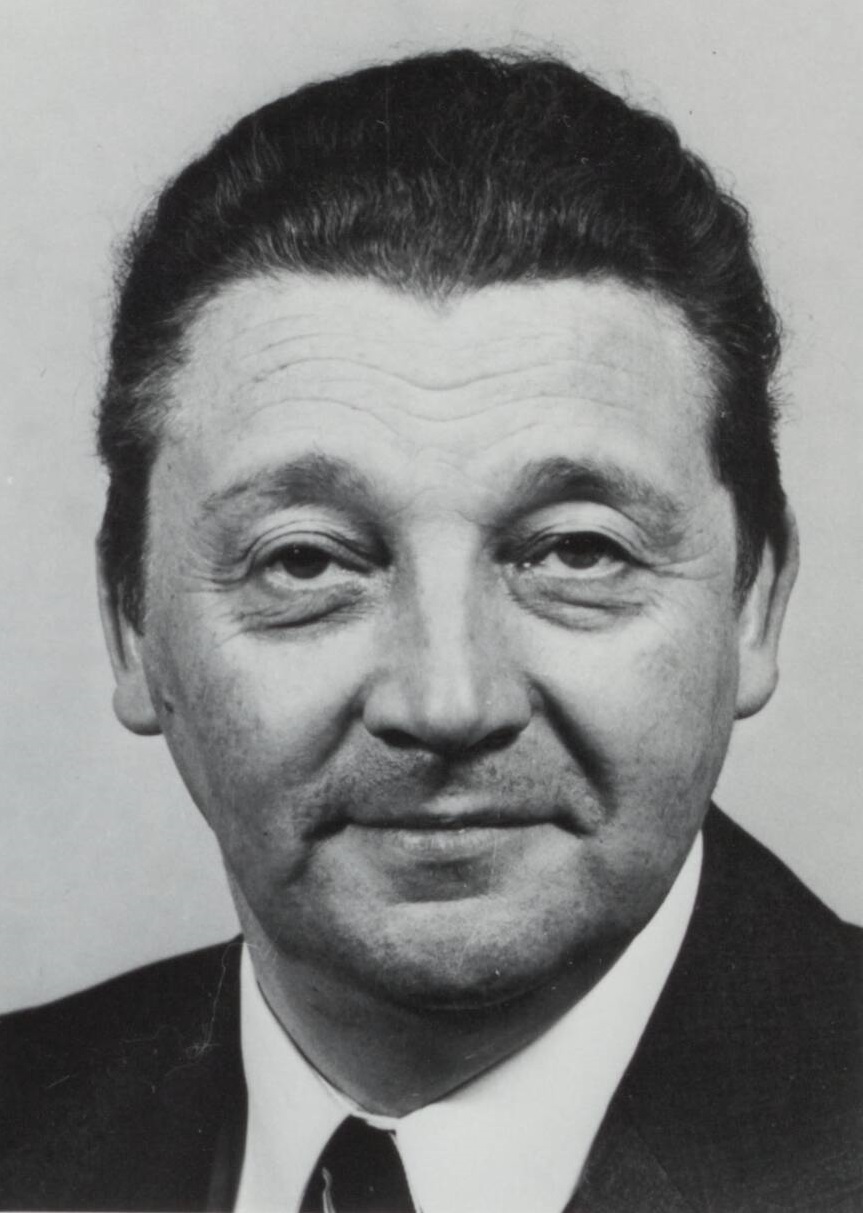
- Hermes in 1978

State Secretary for Education and Sciences
- In office 11 September 1981 – 4 November 1982 Serving with Wim Deetman
- Prime Minister: Dries van Agt
- Preceded by: Klaas de Jong Ozn.
- Succeeded by: Nell Ginjaar-Maas; Gerard van Leijenhorst
- In office 9 January 1978 – 9 September 1981 Serving with Klaas de Jong Ozn.
- Prime Minister: Dries van Agt
- Preceded by: Ger Klein; Klaas de Jong Ozn.
- Succeeded by: Wim Deetman

Member of the House of Representatives
- In office 16 September 1982 – 17 May 1994
- In office 10 June 1981 – 11 September 1981
- Parliamentary group: Christian Democratic Appeal
- In office 11 May 1971 – 9 January 1978
- Parliamentary group: Catholic People's Party

Personal details
- Born: Adrianus Johannes Hermes; 27 August 1929 Breda, Netherlands
- Died: 31 January 2002 (aged 72) Veghel, Netherlands
- Party: Christian Democratic Appeal (from 1980)
- Other party: Catholic People's Party (until 1980)
- Occupation: Politician; Nonprofit director; Teacher

Adrianus Johannes "Ad" Hermes (27 August 1929 – 31 January 2002) was a Dutch politician of the defunct Catholic People's Party (KVP) party and later the Christian Democratic Appeal (CDA) party.
