= Albert Beerman =

Dutch politician

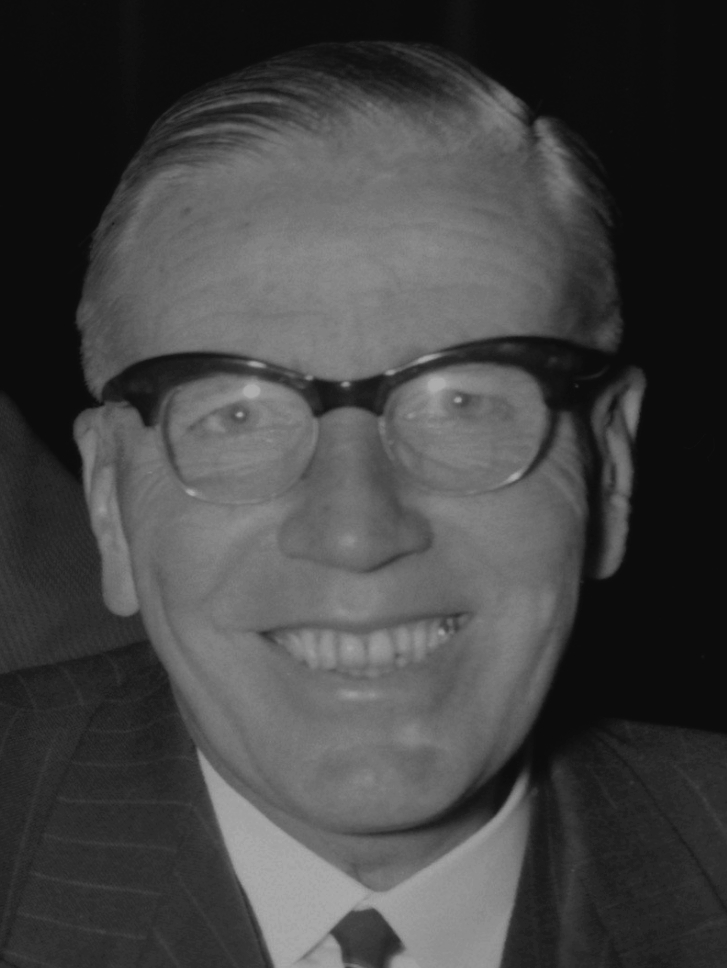
- Beerman in 1960

Minister of Justice
- In office 19 May 1959 – 24 July 1963
- Prime Minister: Jan de Quay
- Preceded by: Teun Struycken
- Succeeded by: Ynso Scholten

Personal details
- Born: Frans Jozef Theo Rutten; 29 January 1901 Amsterdam, Netherlands
- Died: 26 November 1967 (aged 66) Rotterdam, Netherlands
- Party: Christian Historical Union
- Spouse: Cornelia Liza de Roos (m. 1942)
- Children: 2 sons and 2 daughters
- Education: Leiden University (Bachelor of Laws, Master of Laws)
- Occupation: Politician; Jurist; Lawyer; Prosecutor; Judge

Albert Christiaan Wilhelm Beerman (29 January 1901 – 26 November 1967) was a Dutch politician of the Christian Historical Union (CHU). He served as Minister of Justice from 19 May 1959 until 24 July 1963 in the Cabinet De Quay.

Beerman was born in Amsterdam He became a lawyer and a member of the municipal council of Rotterdam. He was Minister of Justice for the CHU in the De Quay cabinet from 1959 to 1963. He died in Rotterdam, aged 66.
