= Jean Antoine d'Averhoult =

French politician (1756 – 1792)

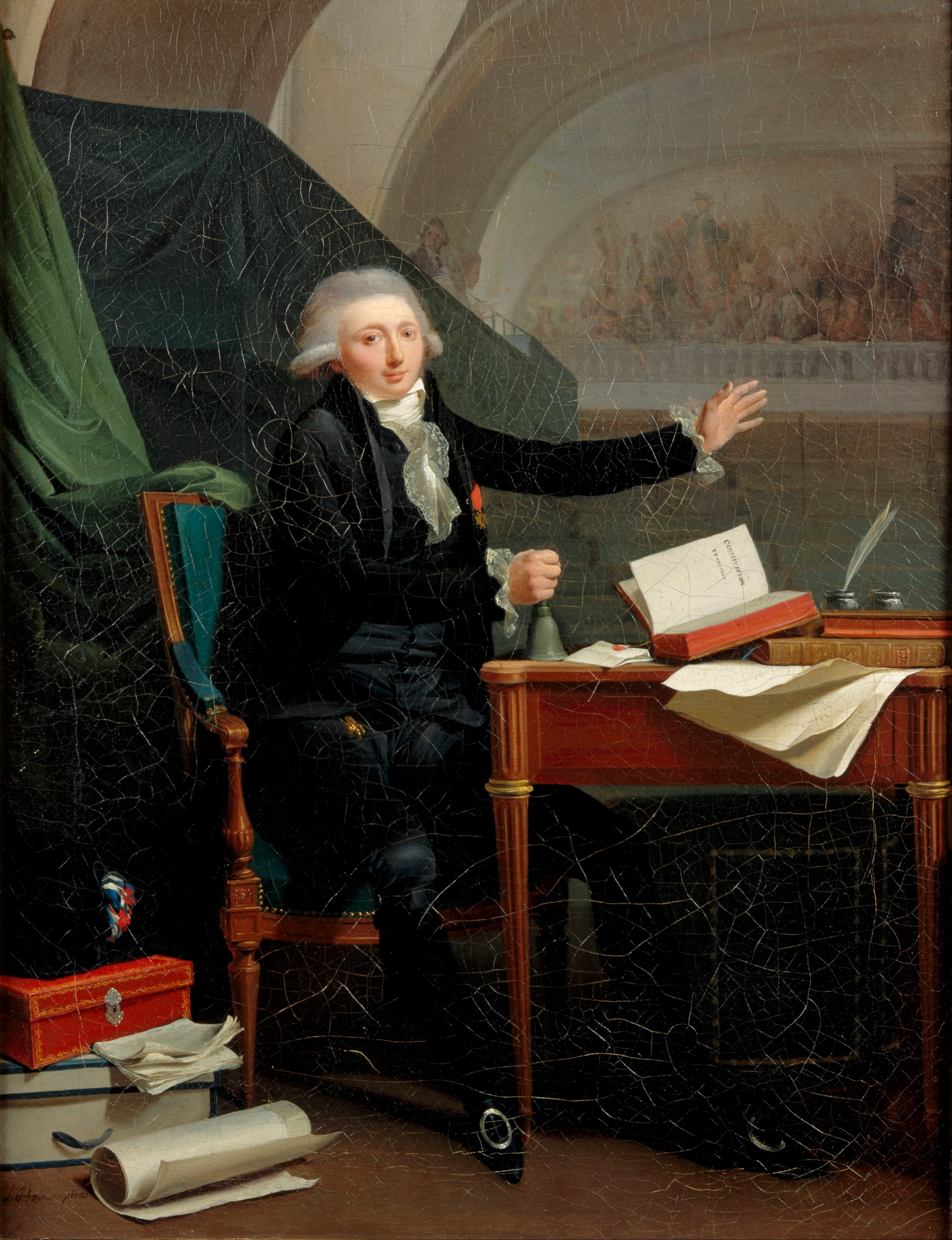
Jean Antoine d'Averhoult, as president of the French National Legislative Assembly in 1792 by Louis-Léopold Boilly

Jean Antoine d'Averhoult, baptized as Jan Anthony d'Averhoult (21 October 1756 in Utrecht – 26 August 1792 in Sedan) was a Dutch military officer and politician of French Huguenot extraction, who played a leading role in both the Patriottentijd and the French Revolution.

== Personal life ==
D'Arnoult was born the son of Jean (Jan) d'Averhoult, a captain in the Dutch States Army and Gerhardina de Valcke, the daughter of a Groningen burgemeester. The father was a scion of a French Huguenot noble family (he was a Sieur de Guincourt), that was, however, not part of the Dutch nobility. A great-grandmother migrated to the Dutch Republic in 1691 after the Revocation of the Edict of Nantes in 1685 with her children, after her spouse died. The family had become fully acculturated as witnessed by the fact that Jan Anthony was baptized in the Jacobi church of Utrecht, which was in use by the congregation of the Dutch Reformed Church, and not in the Église Wallonne. But he was an excellent French speaker. The marriage of his parents went badly, as the father had the mother committed to a borstal-like institution, from which she was only released after his death. During this episode, Jan Anthony was cared for by his paternal aunts, especially the spinster Josina Benjamina d'Averhoult (Note: Who would later commission the portrait by Louis-Léopold Boilly, after they had both migrated to France.) with whom he would develop a strong attachment. He would never marry.

== Career ==
A year after his father's death in 1773 d'Averhoult started his military career as a Cornet with the cavalry regiment Van Eck of the States Army. (Note: His brother Pompejus at the same time became an adelborst (cadet) in the Dutch navy.) He received his commission as a lieutenant with the same regiment, and was later promoted to ritmeester in another cavalry regiment, Van Tuyl van Serooskerken. But in 1785 he resigned his commission. This may have been prompted by his political sympathies. Like many in the early 1780s in the Netherlands, he became very critical of the policies of the stadtholder, William V, Prince of Orange and his regime, which was accused of mismanaging the Fourth Anglo-Dutch War. As a Freemason he was a member of the same lodge as Joan Derk van der Capellen tot den Pol, the author of the revolutionary pamphlet Aan het Volk van Nederland, published in 1781, that criticized both the current policies of the regime and the oligarchic constitution of the Republic, with a regenten-class that monopolized access to political offices. A political movement of opposition to the Orangist, called the Patriots arose, of which d'Averhoult became a member.

In the Spring of 1785 d'Averhoult took a commission in the Turkije company of the Utrecht schutterij that was being rejuvenated by an influx of Patriot Free Corps members. As such he became a leader of the Patriot revolt in Utrecht, together with people like the student leader Quint Ondaatje, who overturned the old vroedschap and replaced it with a popularly elected city council in August 1786. D'Averhoult was elected one of the new members. The Orangist majority in the States of Utrecht did not accept this and moved the States to the Utrecht city of Amersfoort, while the Patriot minority remained in Utrecht. For the time being the Amersfoort States kept hold of the seat of Utrecht province in the States General, however. Meanwhile, the Amersfoort States convinced the stadtholder to garrison Amersfoort with States Army troops under his command. These troops threatened the safety of Utrecht city, as witnessed by the fact that the Amersfoort garrison in early May 1787 attempted to occupy the sluice in Vreeswijk, a strategic object. The Utrecht city authorities decided to thwart this attack. D'Averhoult was placed in command of the relief force that marched down to Vreeswijk om 9 May 1787. This resulted in the Battle of Jutphaas, that the Patriots under d'Averhoult's cool-headed leadership won.

Shortly afterward a constitutional crisis erupted in the States General. These were equally divided between three Orangist provinces (Zeeland, Gelderland and Friesland) and three Patriot provinces (Holland, Groningen and Overijssel), while Utrecht was leaning Orangist, and held the balance. In June 1787 the rival Patriot States of Utrecht demanded to be seated in the States General, supported by the three Patriot provincial delegations. Patriot Overijssel temporarily presided at the time and provisionally seated the Patriot States. This led to riotous behaviour by the delegation of the Amersfoort States of Utrecht, one of whose members, drew his sword in the meeting hall, and challenged d'Averhoult, who was a member of the rival Patriot delegation, to a duel. This may or may not have been held the next day in the Hague Wood, fortunately with only slight damage to the participants. The Amersfoort delegation was eventually restored to its position of sole representative of Utrecht in the States General, giving the majority to the Orangists. This was one of the proximate causes of the Prussian invasion of Holland (Note: As a consequence of the loss of a Patriot majority in the States General, the Patriot States of Holland asked for French mediation in the conflict, and this offered an opportunity for Prussia and Great Britain to muscle in on the process, and put their thumbs in the scale in favour of the Orangists.) That invasion met little resistance from the Patriots, though d'Averhoult again distinguished himself by repelling several Prussian attacks near Fort Nieuwersluis, before his troops were overwhelmed, and he was made a prisoner of war. The Prussians treated him respectfully and he was released and allowed to join the Patriot exodus to Brussels, together with his aunt Josina d'Averhoult.

However, d'Averhoult soon moved on to France, where he claimed his old noble title, and French nationality based on it. On the recommendation of his distant cousin the Marquis de la Fayette, d'Averhoult (now calling himself Jean Antoine) was able to get a commission as a lieutenant-colonel in the French army in February 1788, thanks to the fact that the Edict of Versailles of 1787 made him eligible to serve, even though he remained a Protestant. A few months later he was promoted to colonel. In 1789 he was made a chevalier in the Ordre de Mérite Militaire .

After the Storming of the Bastille he attached himself to his cousin, the Marquis de la Fayette, and together with the latter became a member of the faction of the Feuillants. In September 1791 d'Averhoult was elected a deputy for the Arrondissement of Sedan, in the Ardennes department in the new National Legislative Assembly.

As a deputy, and member of the Feuillants d'Avernoult opposed the Girondins, who were more radical. But in other respects he was relatively radical. He became a member of the Diplomatic Committee of the Assembly, in which he was a voice for taking an aggressive stance against the surrounding states, in which the French Émigrés were making difficulties for the new constitutional kingdom of France. He did not think that they were a serious threat yet, but he pointed to the example of the suppression of the Patriots in the Netherlands to show that it was better to nip such a threat in the bud.

Permettez, Messieurs, que je cite un exemple récent. Proscrit en Hollande et sur le point d’y périr sur l’échafaud pour la cause de la liberté, j’ai vu cette cause sublime perdue en temporisations. C’est pour avoir employé des demi-moyens; c’est pour n’avoir pas écrasé ses adversaires, lorsqu’il en était temps, c’est pour s’être attachée aux effets sans s’attaquer aux causes; c’est pour avoir attendu jusqu’à ce que ses ennemis furent soutenus par une des puissances de premier ordre, que la Hollande est dans les chaînes. (Note: Gentlemen, allow me to cite a recent example. Proscribed in Holland and on the point of dying there on the scaffold for the cause of liberty I have seen that sublime cause lost because of temporisations. It is because of half-measures taken; because of not crushing one's enemies, while there was still time; because of being attached to effects without attacking the causes; because of having waited until one's enemies were supported by one of the Powers of the first order, that Holland is in chains;Jaurès, p. 864)

His proposal to have king Louis XVI issue an ultimatum to the German princes sheltering the émigrés was accepted on 29 November 1791. But d'Averhoult did not wish or expect that France would go to war right away. His intervention did contribute to his popularity in the Assembly and on 8 January 1792 he was elected its president for the usual two weeks. (Note: This was when his aunt commissioned his portrait by Louis-Léopold Boilly. Note that he wears the red ribbon of the Ordre de Mérite Militaire; as a Protestant, he had received the blue ribbon, when he first was given the decoration, but it had recently been changed; Cf. Bruin, p. 142) On 17 January 1792 there was a new debate on declaring war on France's external enemies, in particular Austrian emperor Joseph II. D'Averhoult spoke out against it with the following argument:

Messieurs, soyons vrais; les amis de la liberté voudraient venir au secours de la philosophie outragée par la ligue des princes, ils voudraient appeler tous les peuples à cette liberté, et propager une sainte insurrection; voilà le véritable motif des démarches inconsidérées qu’on vous propose. Mais devez-vous laisser à la philosophie elle-même le soin d’éclairer l’univers, pour fonder, par des progrès plus lents mais plus sûrs, le bonheur du genre humain et l’alliance fraternelle de tous les peuples ? ou bien devez-vous, pour hâter ces effets, risquer la perte de votre liberté et celle du genre humain, en proclamant les droits de l’homme au milieu du carnage et de la destruction ? (Note: Gentlemen, let us be true; the friends of liberty would want to come to the aid of the philosophy that is outraged by the league of (German) princes, they would want to call all peoples to this liberty, and spread a holy insurrection; that is the real motive for the ill-considered steps that they propose to you. But should you leave to philosophy itself the task of illuminating the universe, to find, by slower, but surer progresses, the happiness of the human race and the fraternal alliance of all peoples? Or should you, for hastening its effects, risk the loss of your liberty and that of the human race, while proclaiming the rights of man in the middle of carnage and destruction?;Jaurès, p. 908)

This argument carried the day: the emperor Joseph was censured, but war was not yet declared. But this was only a temporary delay. The Girondins soon carried the Assembly in forcing a new government on the king, and in April 1792 forcing a declaration of war on emperor Joseph (Note: D'Averhoult had meanwhile not forgotten his Dutch compatriots in exile in France. On 19 January 1792 he allowed a deputation of Dutch Patriots to address the Assembly; Bruin, p. 143-144)

France radicalized more and more, and the Feuillants lost their influence to the Girondins and the rising Jacobins. D'Averhoult nevertheless spoke out against the illiberal measures that were taken, like the reintroduction of internal passports, and the lawlessness of the Paris Mob. For instance, he spoke out against the lawlessness of the Journée de 20 juin, even in vain demanding the sanctioning of the local authorities who had failed to suppress that riot. But external developments made his position untenable: the Prussians entered the war after issuing an maladroit ultimatum, in which they demanded the reinstatement of the king in his old powers (reminiscent of the demand to reinstate the stadtholder in September 1787). In the following furor d'Averhoult on 26 July announced that he resigned as deputy in the Assembly. He took a commission as Colonel of the 7th regiment of dragoons, and departed for the front in northern France.

The overthrow of the monarchy on 10 August 1792 precipitated the defection of the Marquis de la Fayette. And this brought d'Averhoult under suspicion also. On 18 August a warrant for his arrest was issued by the Assembly. He tried to flee across the border near Sedan, together with a servant, but they were intercepted by armed peasants who demanded to see his passport. In the ensuing fight, d'Averhoult managed to shoot his way out (though his servant was arrested). D'Averhoult then tried to escape on his own but was again intercepted by armed peasants. What happened next remains disputed. At some point, someone, either d'Averhoult himself or someone else, put a pistol to the top of his head and pulled the trigger. He died a few hours later, on 26 August 1792 of this wound in Sedan, where he had been transported, in the presence of his Dutch friend Daniël Michiel Gijsbert Heldewier. He was buried in the Protestant cemetery of the Faubourg du Fond de Givonne. He was mourned by his aunt, who soon returned to the Netherlands. But Princess Wilhelmina, the wife of the stadtholder, true to form, wrote to her husband:

La fin de Daverhoult est digne de sa vie; tous nos Patriotes pourront bien actuellemen recevoir de façon ou d'autre la juste récompense de leurs actions. (Note: The end of Daverhoult is worthy of his life; all our Patriots could in one way or the other now well receive the just deserts of their actions; Cf. Bruin, p. 146)

== Sources ==
- Aa, A.J. van der (1852). "Averhoult, Jan Anthony d, in:Biographisch woordenboek der Nederlanden., vol. 1". Huyghens ING. Haarlem: J.J. van Brederode. p. 438.
- Bruin, Renger E. de (2006). "De cirkel gesloten : de Utrechtse hugenoot Jean Antoine d'Averhoult (1756-1792) en zijn gewelddadig einde als Franse revolutionair". Jaarboek Oud-Utrecht (in Dutch): 122–148. hdl:1874/215002. ISSN 0923-7046.
- Jaurès, J. (1901–1908). Histoire socialiste de la Révolution française : La Législative. Éditions Rouff.
