= Wim Deetman =

Dutch politician (born 1945)

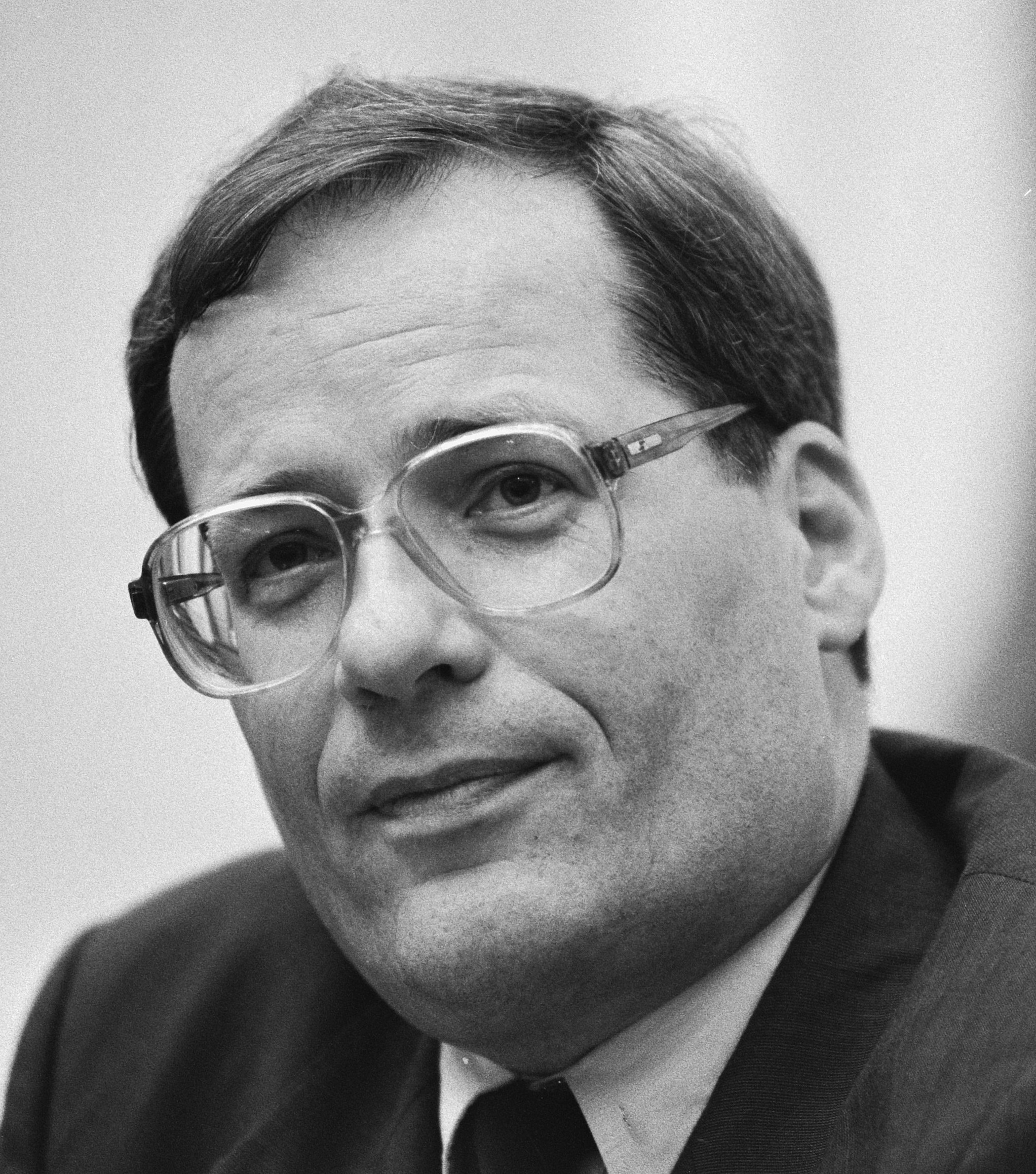
- Deetman in 1989

Member of the Council of State
- In office 1 January 2008 – 1 May 2015
- Vice President: Herman Tjeenk Willink (2008–2012); Piet Hein Donner (2012–2015)

Mayor of The Hague
- In office 1 December 1996 – 1 January 2008
- Preceded by: Peter Noordanus (ad interim)
- Succeeded by: Jetta Klijnsma (ad interim)

Speaker of the House of Representatives
- In office 14 September 1989 – 1 December 1996
- Preceded by: Dick Dolman
- Succeeded by: Piet Bukman

Minister of Education and Sciences
- In office 29 May 1982 – 14 September 1989
- Prime Minister: Dries van Agt (1982); Ruud Lubbers (1982–1989)
- Preceded by: Jos van Kemenade
- Succeeded by: Gerrit Braks (ad interim)

State Secretary for Education and Sciences
- In office 11 September 1981 – 29 May 1982 Serving with Ad Hermes
- Prime Minister: Dries van Agt
- Preceded by: Klaas de Jong Ozn. Ad Hermes
- Succeeded by: Ad Hermes

Member of the House of Representatives
- In office 14 September 1989 – 1 December 1996
- In office 3 June 1986 – 14 July 1986
- In office 16 September 1982 – 4 November 1982
- In office 16 January 1978 – 11 September 1981
- Parliamentary group: Christian Democratic Appeal

Personal details
- Born: Willem Joost Deetman; 3 April 1945 (age 81) The Hague, Netherlands
- Party: Christian Democratic Appeal (from 1980)
- Other political affiliations: Christian Historical Union (1963–1980)
- Children: 3 children
- Education: Free University Amsterdam (Bachelor of Social Science, Master of Social Science)
- Occupation: Politician · Civil servant · Researcher · Corporate director · Nonprofit director · Sport administrator · Teacher

Willem Joost "Wim" Deetman (born 3 April 1945) is a retired Dutch politician and teacher who served as Minister of Education and Sciences from 1982 to 1989, Speaker of the House of Representatives from 1989 to 1996 and Mayor of The Hague from 1996 until 2008. He was a member of the Christian Historical Union (CHU) until it was merged into the Christian Democratic Appeal (CDA) in 1980, which he joined.

== Education and early career ==
Deetman attended a Gymnasium in Gouda from June 1957 until June 1963, and applied at the Free University Amsterdam in July 1966 majoring in Political science and obtained a Bachelor of Social Science degree in June 1968 before graduating with a Master of Social Science degree in July 1972. Deetman worked as a researcher for the Protestant Christian Education association (VBPCO) from August 1972 until May 1974. Deetman served on the Municipal Council of Gouda from April 1974 until September 1981. Deetman worked as a civics teacher and principal at a middle school in Gouda from May 1974 until January 1978.

== Election to the House of Representatives ==
Deetman became a Member of the House of Representatives after Durk van der Mei was appointed as State Secretary for Foreign Affairs in the Cabinet Van Agt–Wiegel after the election of 1977, taking office on 16 January 1978. After the election of 1981 Deetman was appointed as State Secretary for Education and Sciences in the Cabinet Van Agt II, taking office on 11 September 1981. The Cabinet Van Agt II fell just seven months into its term on 12 May 1982 and continued to serve in a demissionary capacity until the first cabinet formation of 1982 when it was replaced by the caretaker Cabinet Van Agt III with Deetman appointed as Minister of Education and Sciences, taking office on 29 May 1982. After the election of 1982 Deetman returned as a Member of the House of Representatives, taking office on 16 September 1982. Following the second cabinet formation of 1982 Deetman continued as Minister of Education and Sciences in the Cabinet Lubbers I, taking office on 4 November 1982. After the election of 1986 Deetman again returned as a Member of the House of Representatives, taking office on 3 June 1986. Following the second cabinet formation of 1986 Deetman remained as Minister of Education and Sciences in the Cabinet Lubbers II, taking office on 14 July 1986. The Cabinet Lubbers II fell on 3 May 1989 and continued to serve in a demissionary capacity. After the election of 1989 Deetman once again returned as a Member of the House of Representatives and was elected as Speaker of the House of Representatives, he resigned as Minister of Education and Sciences the same day he was installed as a Member of the House of Representatives and Speaker of the House of Representatives, taking office on 14 September 1989. After the election of 1994 Deetman was re-elected as Speaker of the House of Representatives, taking office on 17 May 1994. In November 1996 Deetman was nominated as Mayor of The Hague, he resigned as a Member of the House of Representatives and Speaker of the House of Representatives the same day he was installed as Mayor, taking office on 1 December 1996. In July 2007 Deetman announced he was stepping down as Mayor. In December 2009 Deetman was nominated as a Member of the Council of State, he resigned as Mayor the same day he was installed as a Member of the Council of State, serving from 1 January 2008 until 1 May 2015.

Deetman retired after spending 37 years in national politics and became active in the private sector and public sector and occupied numerous seats as a corporate director and nonprofit director on several boards of directors and supervisory boards (ADO Den Haag, ProDemos, Mauritshuis, Parliamentary Documentation Center, HMC Bronovo, Kloosterkerk, Madurodam, Cornelia Foundation and the Institute for Multiparty Democracy) and served on several state commissions and councils on behalf of the government (Catholic Church sexual abuse Commission and Public Pension Funds APB).

== Decorations ==
Honours
Ribbon bar	Honour	Country	Date	Comment
	Grand Cross of the Order of Leopold II	Belgium	10 March 1986	
	Commander of the Order of the Netherlands Lion	Netherlands	20 November 1989	
	Grand Officer of the Legion of Honour	France	20 January 1993	
	Commander of the Order of the Oak Crown	Luxembourg	25 January 1996	
	Commander of the Order of Orange-Nassau	Netherlands	27 April 2015	Elevated from Officer (1 December 1996)

Political offices
Preceded by Klaas de Jong Ozn.	State Secretary for Education and Sciences; 1981–1982; With: Ad Hermes	Succeeded by Ad Hermes
Preceded by Ad Hermes	State Secretary for Education and Sciences; 1981–1982; With: Ad Hermes	Succeeded by Ad Hermes
Preceded by Jos van Kemenade	Minister of Education and Sciences; 1982–1989	Succeeded by Gerrit Braks; Ad interim
Preceded by Dick Dolman	Speaker of the House of Representatives; 1989–1996	Succeeded by Piet Bukman
Preceded by Ad Havermans	Mayor of The Hague; 1996–2008	Succeeded by Jetta Klijnsma; Ad interim
Non-profit organization positions
Preceded by Jo Ritzen	Chairman of the Supervisory board of ProDemos; 2010–2018	Succeeded by Ed Nijpels
Sporting positions
Preceded by Ton Rutgrink	Vice Chairman of the Supervisory board of ADO Den Haag; 2016–2017	Succeeded by John van Ringelenstein
