= Jetta Klijnsma =

Dutch politician

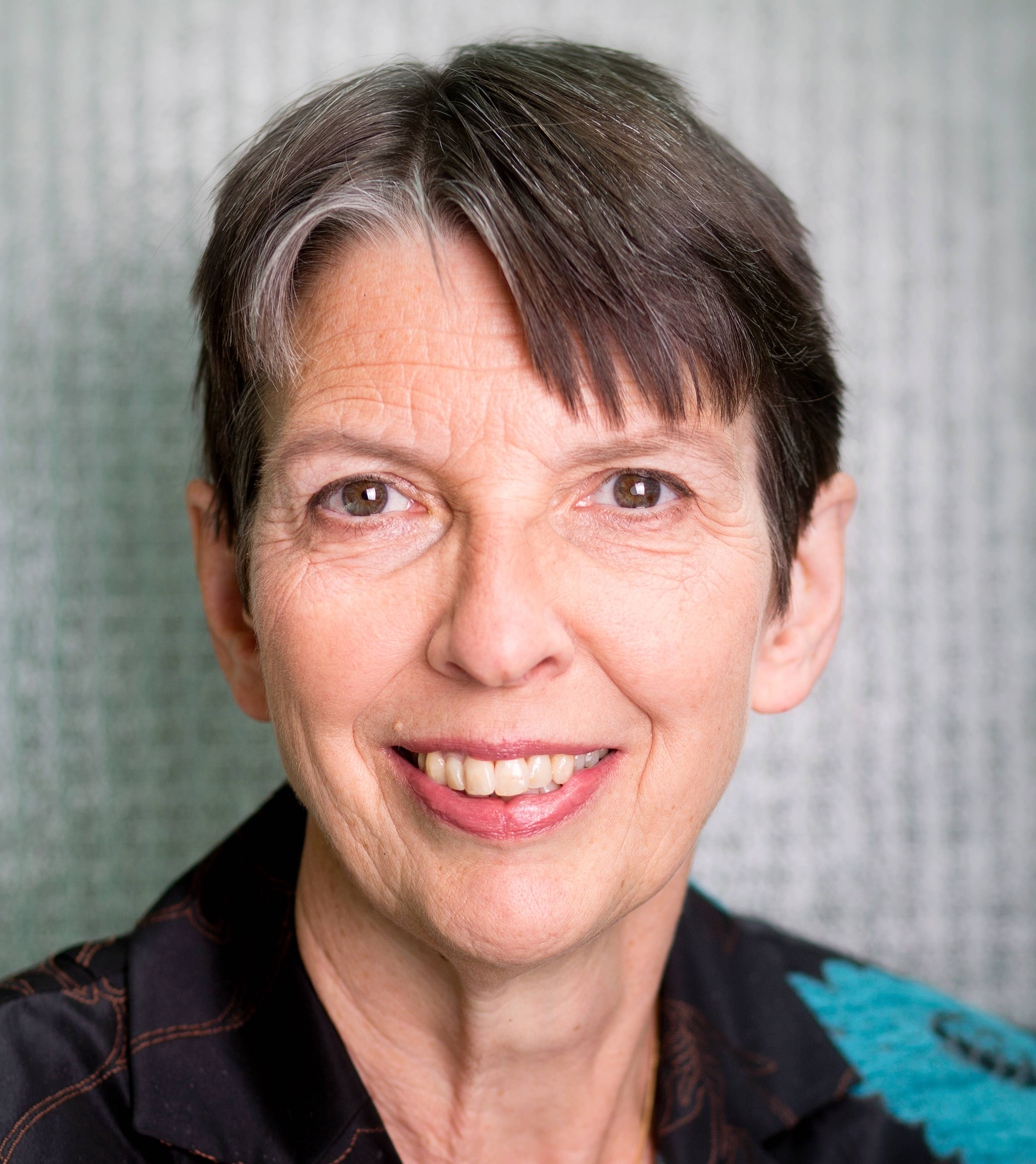
- Klijnsma in 2015

King's Commissioner of Drenthe
- In office 1 December 2017 – 30 November 2025
- Monarch: Willem-Alexander
- Preceded by: Jozias van Aartsen (Acting)
- Succeeded by: Agnes Mulder

State Secretary for Social Affairs and Employment
- In office 5 November 2012 – 26 October 2017
- Prime Minister: Mark Rutte
- Preceded by: Paul de Krom
- Succeeded by: Tamara van Ark
- In office 18 December 2008 – 23 February 2010
- Prime Minister: Jan Peter Balkenende
- Preceded by: Ahmed Aboutaleb
- Succeeded by: Paul de Krom

Member of the House of Representatives
- In office 17 June 2010 – 5 November 2012

Mayor of The Hague
- Ad interim
- In office 1 January 2008 – 26 March 2008
- Preceded by: Wim Deetman
- Succeeded by: Jozias van Aartsen

Personal details
- Born: Jellejetta Klijnsma; 18 March 1957 (age 69) Hoogeveen, Netherlands
- Party: Labour Party
- Education: University of Groningen (Bachelor of Arts, Master of Arts)
- Occupation: Politician; historian; political consultant; nonprofit director

Jellejetta "Jetta" Klijnsma (Dutch pronunciation: [ˈjɛtaː ˈklɛinsmaː]; born 18 March 1957) is a Dutch politician who was serving as the King's Commissioner of Drenthe from 2017 till 2025. She is a member of the Labour Party (PvdA).

Elected to the House of Representatives from 2010 to 2012, she focused on matters of culture, senior citizens, disabled people and medical ethics. Previously she was State Secretary for Social Affairs and Employment under the Fourth Balkenende cabinet (2008–2010) and an alderwoman of the municipality of The Hague (1998–2008). From 2012 to 2017 she was appointed again as State Secretary for Social Affairs and Employment, dealing with the matters of unemployment insurances, pay equality, long-term unemployment, poverty, health and safety at work under the Second Rutte cabinet.

== Early life ==
Klijnsma was born 18 March 1957 in Hoogeveen. She studied history at the University of Groningen, with a specialization in social history and economic history. After graduating she began to work for the Labour Party's parliamentary group. She was assistant to MPs André van der Louw, Marcel van Dam and Thijs Wöltgens.

Klijnsma has a physical handicap. She was born with spastic legs and only learned how to walk at age thirteen. She has a Reformed background but turned non-religious and became a member of the Dutch Humanist League.

== Political career ==
In 1990 she was elected to the municipal council of The Hague. In 1998 she became alderwoman for welfare, health and emancipation. After the 2006 municipal elections she became responsible for culture and finance and also became vice-mayor. After Wim Deetman stepped down, she was mayor ad interim of The Hague and so became the first woman in that function.

In December 2008 she succeeded fellow Labour Party politician Ahmed Aboutaleb as State Secretary for Social Affairs and Employment in the Fourth Balkenende cabinet. She was State Secretary until February 2010, when the Labour Party withdrew its support for Balkenende's government. An MP from 2010 to 2012, she was appointed again as Social Affairs State Secretary in the Second Rutte cabinet in November 2012, serving until the inauguration on 26 October 2017 of the Third Rutte cabinet which the PvdA does not support. On 1 November 2017 she was appointed King's Commissioner of the province of Drenthe after former The Hague Mayor Jozias van Aartsen was appointed in March 2017 as Acting Commissioner; she took office on 1 December.

== Decorations ==
Honours
Ribbon bar	Honour	Country	Date	Comment
	Knight of the Order of Orange-Nassau	Netherlands	14 February 2018	

Political offices
Preceded by Wim Deetman	Mayor of The Hague; Ad interim 2008	Succeeded by Jozias van Aartsen
Preceded by Ahmed Aboutaleb	State Secretary for Social Affairs and Employment; 2008–2010; 2012–2017	Succeeded by Paul de Krom
Preceded by Paul de Krom	State Secretary for Social Affairs and Employment; 2008–2010; 2012–2017	Succeeded by Tamara van Ark
Preceded by Jozias van Aartsen; Acting	King's Commissioner of Drenthe; 2017–2025	Succeeded by Agnes Mulder
