= Battle of Jutphaas =

- Part of the Patriot era
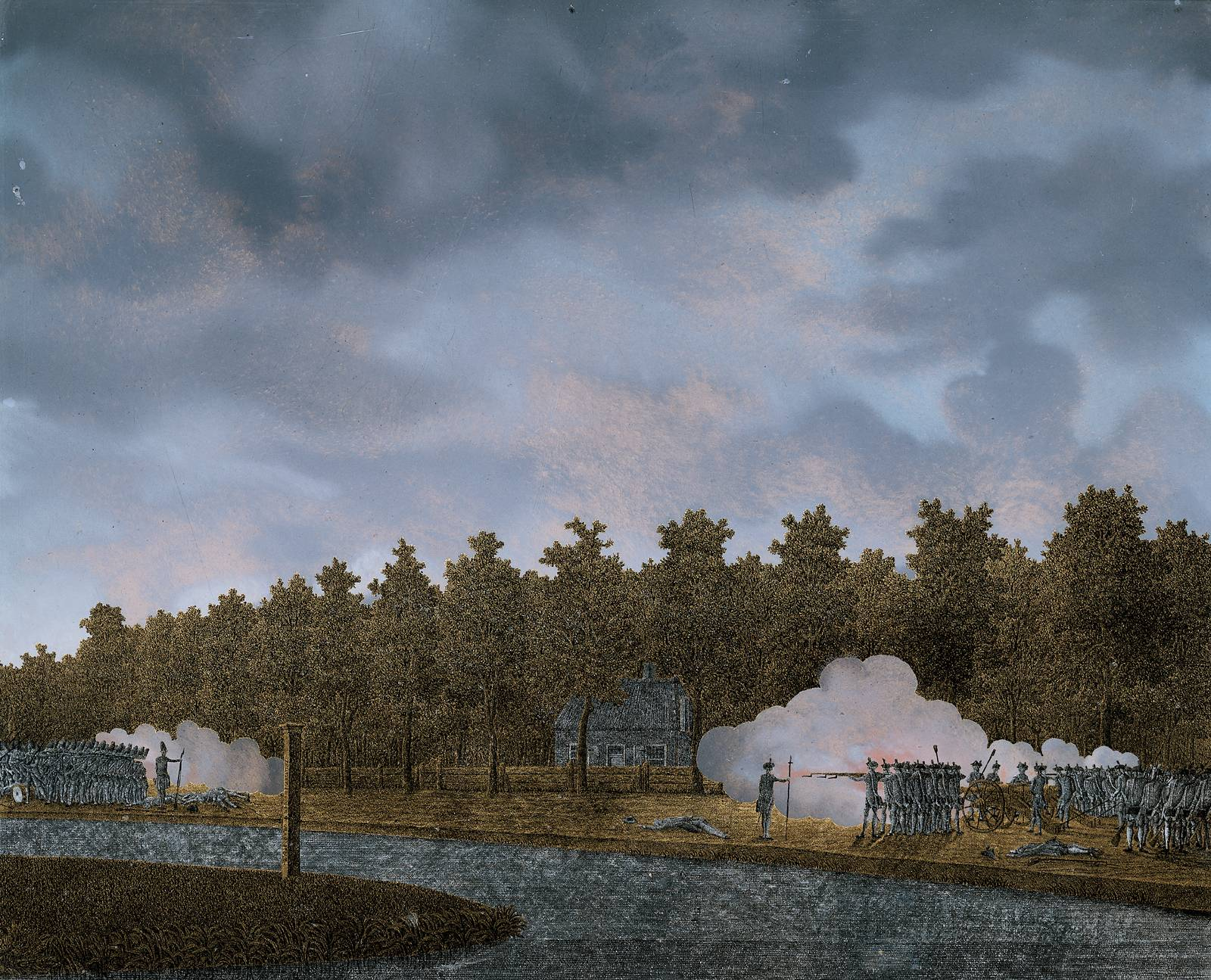
- Battle of Jutphaas: the Utrecht Patriots on the right, the stadtholderian forces on the left.
Date	9 May 1787
Location	Vaartsche Rijn near Jutphaas, Utrecht, Dutch Republic
Result	Patriot victory

Belligerents
(Dutch Republic) Patriots	(Dutch Republic) Orangists

Commanders and leaders
Jean Antoine d'Averhoult; Cornelis Visscher †; Johan van der Vlerk †	Count of Efferen

Strength
Unknown	300

The Battle of Jutphaas, also known as the Battle of the Vaart or the Battle of Vreeswijk, occurred on 9 May 1787 on the banks of the Vaartsche Rijn canal near Jutphaas and Vreeswijk between Orangists and Patriots.

== Background ==
The battle was part of an ever-escalating conflict, dubbed a "civil war" by some, in the Dutch Republic. Orangists, who supported stadtholder William V, Prince of Orange and his aristocratic stadtholderian regime, stood against democratic Patriots, who favoured a new democratic republic and the abolition of nobility and the Orange stadtholderate. Aristocratic Patriots or "Old Patriots", who previously cooperated with the democratic Patriots, increasingly changed their alliances in favour of Orange as the group of democrats grew in size and radicalised. The Patriots, who started arming themselves and formed exercitiegenootschappen across the Republic from 1783 onwards, demanded reforms to how the country was governed. Beginning in 1782, they seized power in more and more cities, where they elected vroedschappen by popular vote instead of traditional cooptation or appointment by the stadtholder.

The city of Utrecht was taken over by the Patriot Free corps led by Quint Ondaatje and Jacobus Bellamy on 2 August 1785. The stadtholder and the Orangist regenten declared Utrecht to be a city in rebellion, and relocated the seat of the States of Utrecht to Amersfoort, while stadtholderian troops set up camp near Zeist. William V had to flee from The Hague to Nijmegen in September 1785, when Patriots seized power and deprived him of the command of the Hague garrison. In September 1786, however, stadtholderian forces acted swiftly to retake the small Guelderian cities Hattem and Elburg, occupied by Patriots under Herman Willem Daendels, requiring minimal armed violence. Although these clashes were militarily insignificant, their political impact was great: they sharpened the existing divisions and led to a further militarisation of the conflict.

== Battle ==
Meanwhile, international diplomacy with France (pro-Patriot), Prussia and Britain (pro-Orange) yielded no results. Orangist troops then moved to occupy several places including Soestdijk, and later Vreeswijk under the count of Efferen. That last move went too far for the Utrecht Patriots, because the sluice at Vreeswijk enabled them to protect the city's south flank by inundations. They decided to send an army commanded by Jean Antoine d'Averhoult, member of the Utrecht vroedschap. The pro-Patriot States of Holland then ordered troops to camp in the border region with Utrecht, under general Albert van Rijssel's command at Woerden.

For contemporaries it wasn't clear where exactly the battle had taken place. Contemporaneous sources both mention Iutphaas onder d' Vaart and het dorp de Vaart, the latter referring to Vreeswijk. Nowadays it has been established the fighting happened on the location of the modern residential area of Fokkesteeg between Jutphaas and Vreeswijk (in 1971 merged to Nieuwegein) and commenced around 10:30 pm. The armies coincidentally ran into each other. Initially, the Patriots intended to negotiate, but the Orangists were startled by the sudden appearance of the enemy, and immediately opened fire. Relatively few casualties were sustained, including the Patriot leaders Cornelis Govert Visscher and Johan van der Vlerk. The Patriots managed to gain the upper hand and emerged victorious. The Orangist soldiers fled, leaving some spoils of war on the battlefield. Both sides retreated.

== Impact ==
Although of minor military importance, the Patriot press exploited the victory in all sorts of propagandist pamphlets and songs. The Patriots portrayed themselves as heroic, and compared the clash with the Battle of Thermopylae (480 BCE). A folk hero cult evolved around especially Cornelis Visscher, who was given a solemn state funeral.

No matter how small his defeat, it confirmed that the prince was no longer able to control the country's internal affairs through force. Moreover, a few days later Amsterdam came firmly into Patriot hands when the Orangist Bijltjesoproer was put down on 30 May. His wife Wilhelmina of Prussia's arrest at Goejanverwellesluis (28 June) underlined this powerlessness, and prompted Orange to once more petition Prussia to intervene. King Frederick William II of Prussia mounted diplomatic pressure, but the Patriots were not prepared to make any concessions. In the meantime, the States of Holland formed Defence Commission with the Utrecht Patriots on 19 July on the recommendation of the Amsterdam Patriots. The Prussian invasion of Holland eventually occurred in September 1787, with 25,000 troops easily crushing the Patriot rebels, who did not receive any help from their allies France or the United States, and were forced to surrender within a month. Many Patriots fled to France or the Southern Netherlands, or went underground by forming "reading clubs", that ostensibly convened to discuss books, but actually were about politics. The Orange regime was restored and would survive until the Batavian Revolution of January 1795, supported by Revolutionary France's invading armies with many exiled Patriots amongst their ranks.

== Gallery ==
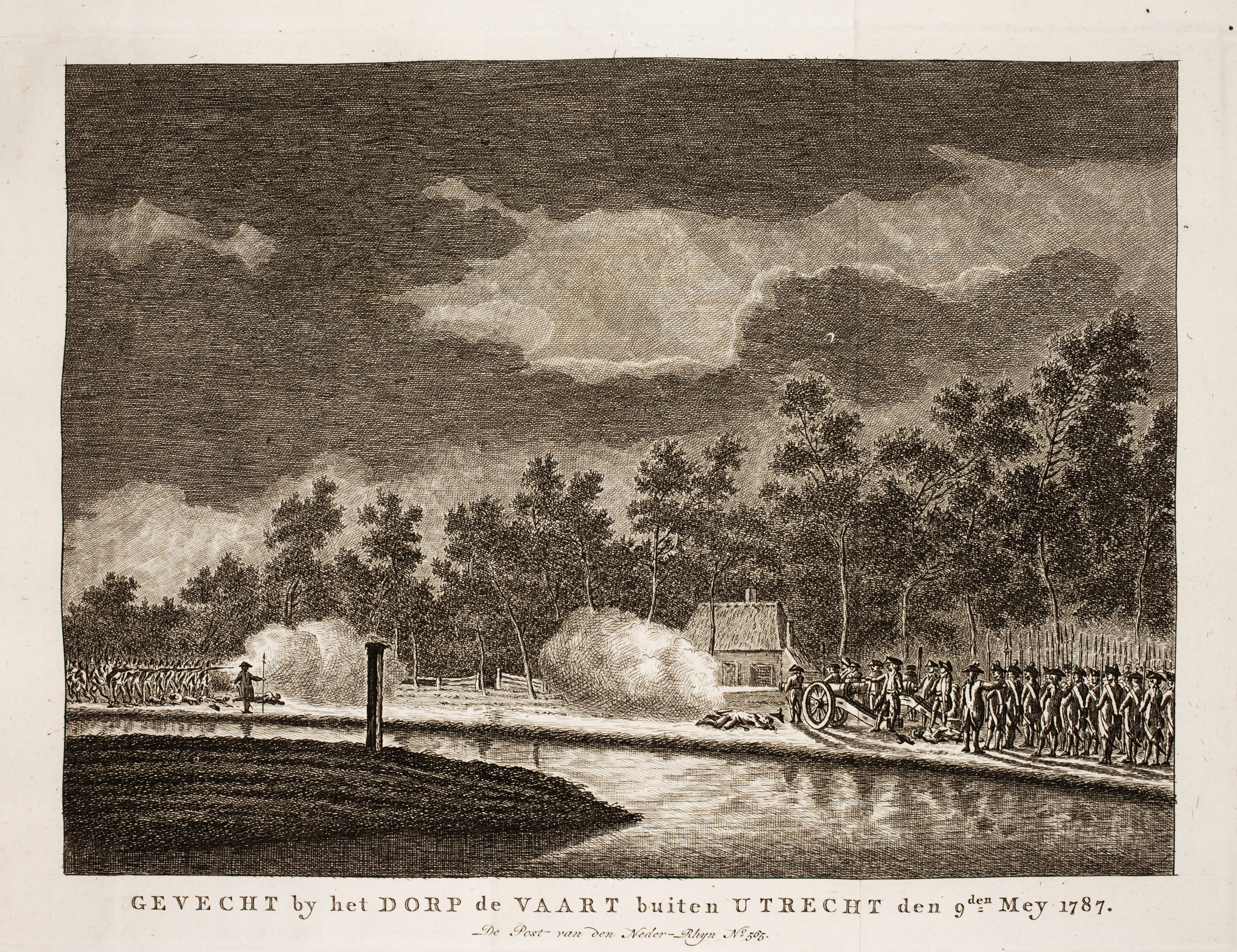
Firefight next to the Vaartsche Rijn, De Post van den Neder-Rhijn.

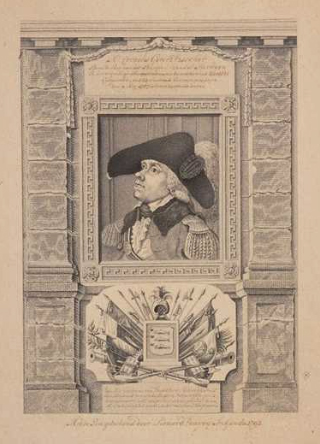
Cornelis Govert Visscher, Patriot leader fallen near Jutphaas.

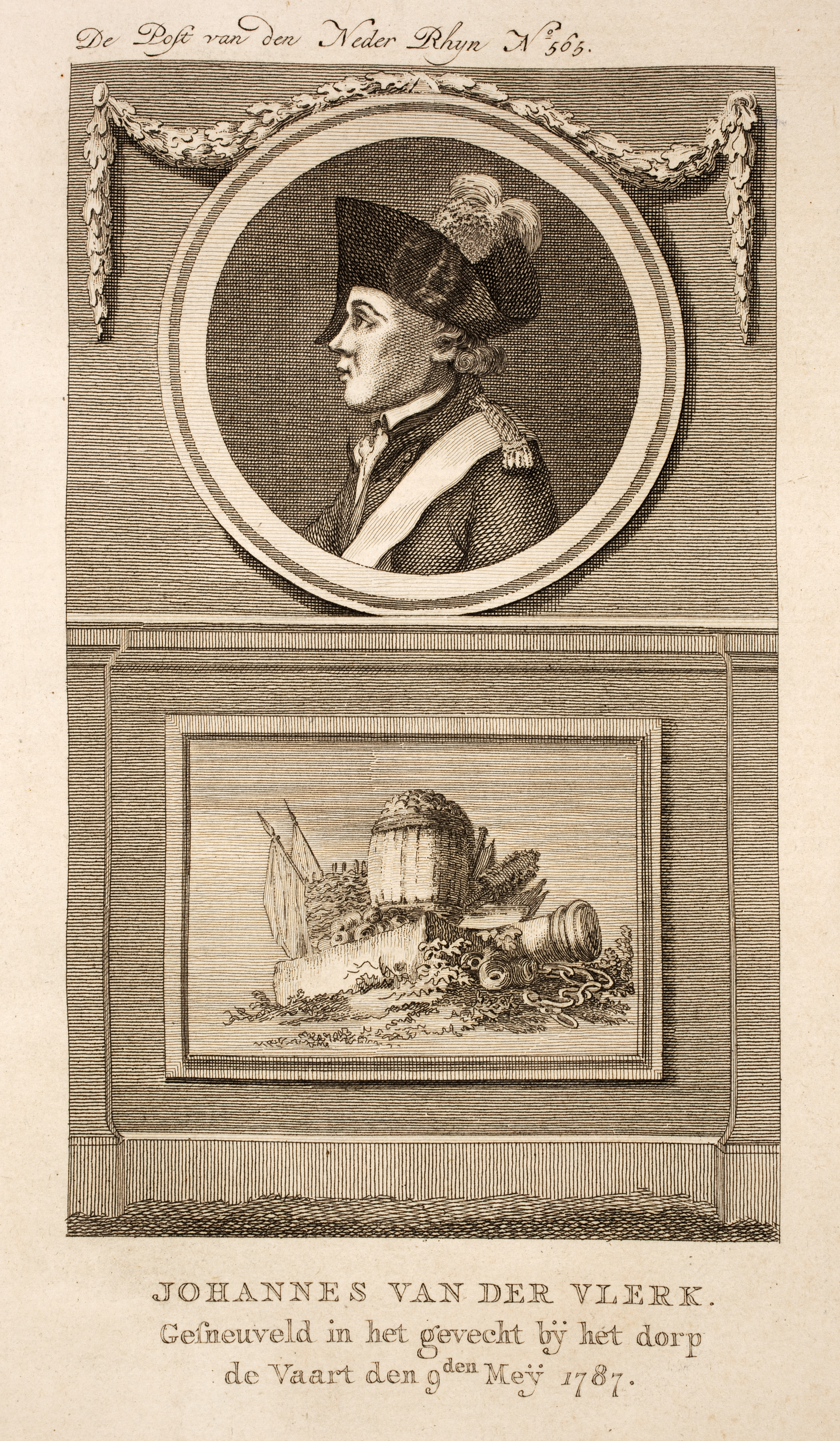
Johan van der Vlerk, Patriot leader fallen near Jutphaas.
