= Ger Klein =

Dutch politician (1925–1998)

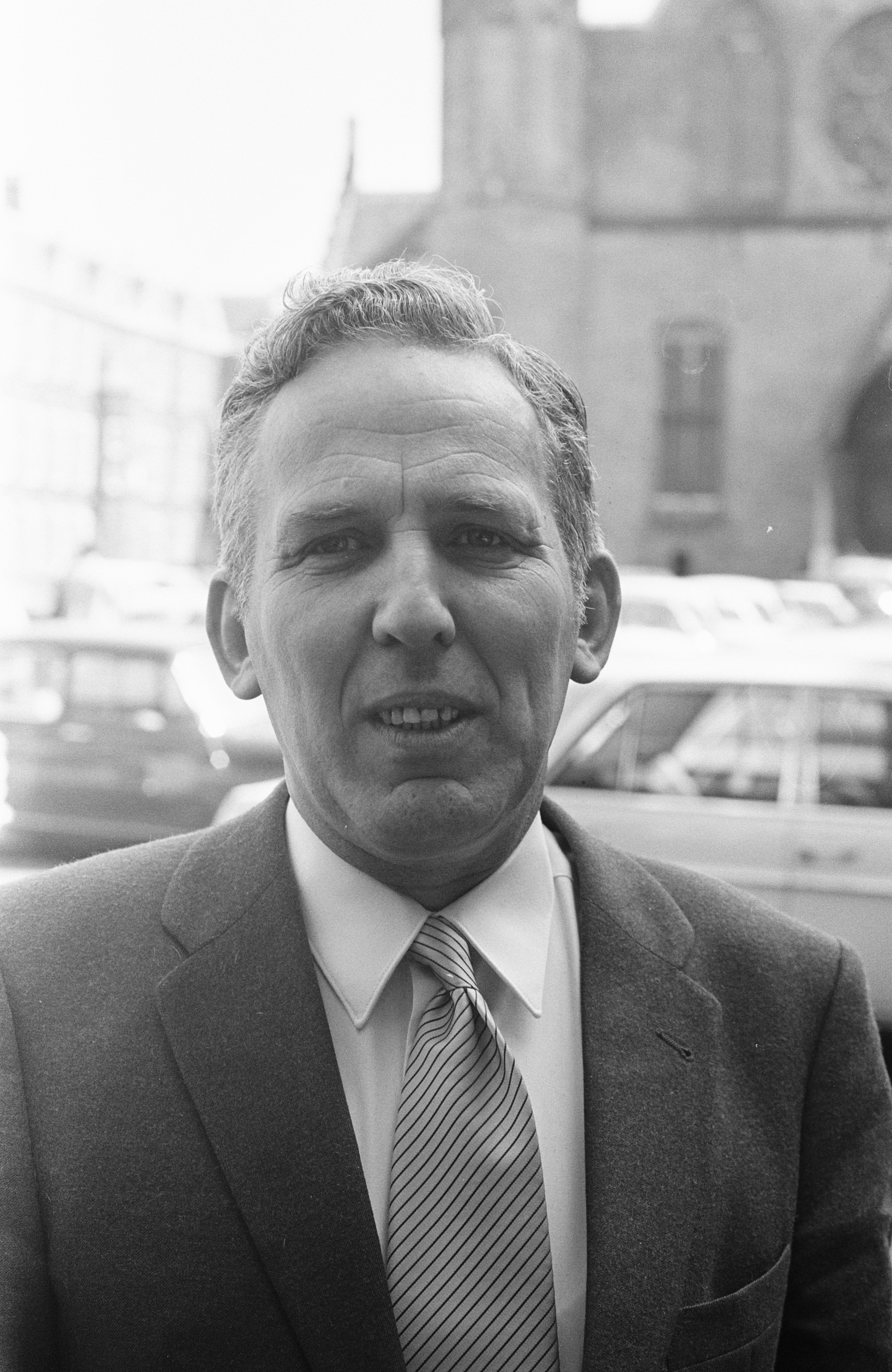
- Klein in 1973

State Secretary for Education and Sciences
- In office 11 May 1973 – 8 September 1977 Serving with Antoon Veerman
- Prime Minister: Joop den Uyl
- Minister: Jos van Kemenade
- Preceded by: Kees Schelfhout
- Succeeded by: Klaas de Jong Ozn.

Member of the House of Representatives
- In office 7 December 1972 – 10 May 1973
- In office 8 June 1977 – 4 February 1980

Personal details
- Born: Gerrit Klein; 4 September 1925 Den Helder, Netherlands
- Died: 9 December 1998 (aged 73) Rotterdam, Netherlands
- Party: Labour Party (PvdA)
- Occupation: Politician; Physicist

Gerrit "Ger" Klein (4 September 1925 – 9 December 1998) was a Dutch politician of the Labour Party (PvdA) and professor of physics.

== Bibliography ==
- Ger Klein; Jaap van der Wijk (1 January 1994). Over de rooie (Paperback) (in Dutch). Balans. ISBN 9050182607.

Political offices
Preceded by Kees Schelfhout	State Secretary for Education and Sciences; 1973–1977	Succeeded by Klaas de Jong Ozn.
