= Paul de Krom =

Dutch business executive and former politician

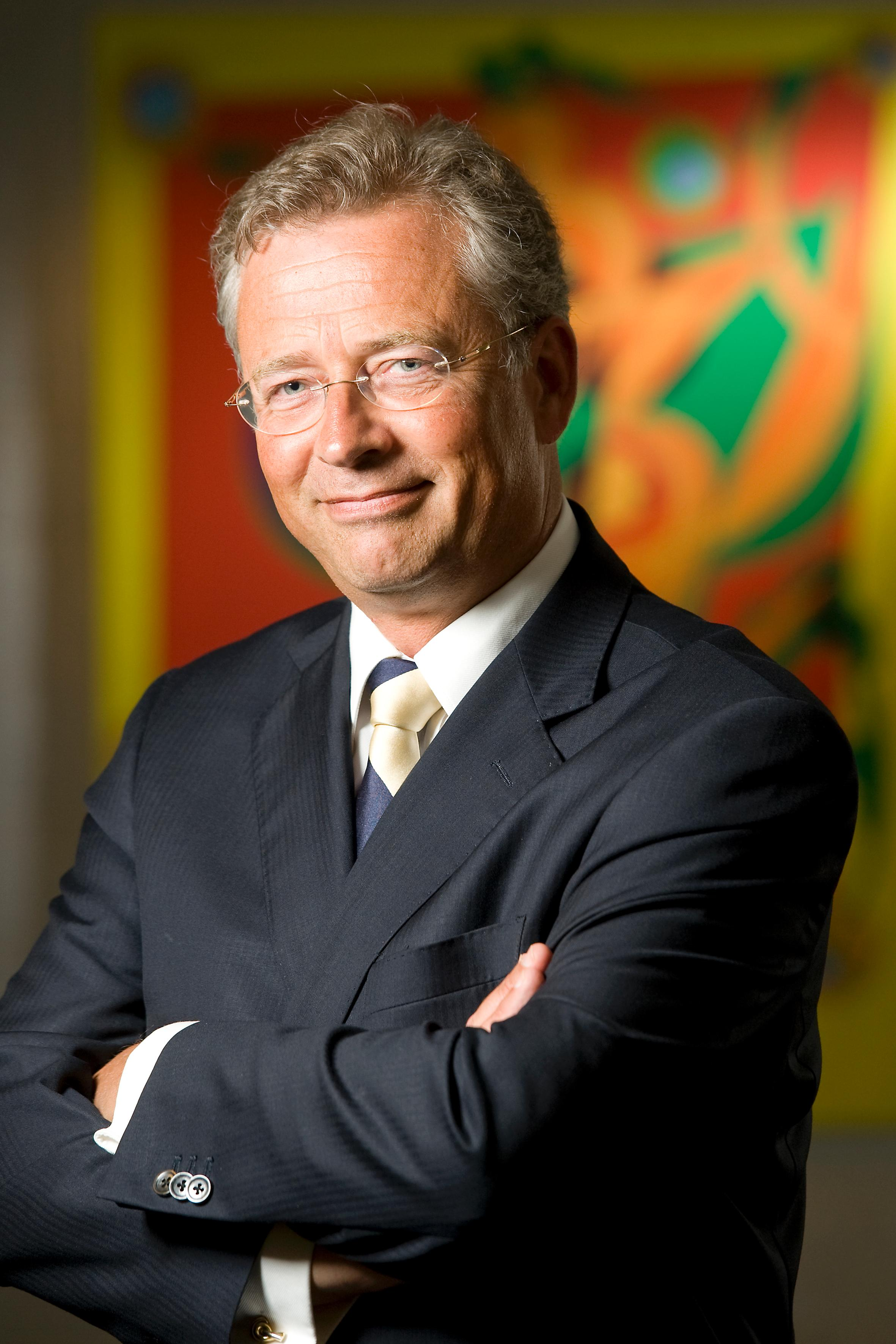
- Paul de Krom in 2011

State Secretary for Social Affairs and Employment
- In office 14 October 2010 – 5 November 2012
- Prime Minister: Mark Rutte
- Preceded by: Jetta Klijnsma
- Succeeded by: Jetta Klijnsma

Member of the House of Representatives
- In office 30 January 2003 – 14 October 2010
- Parliamentary group: People's Party for Freedom and Democracy

Personal details
- Born: Paul de Krom; 10 February 1963 (age 63) Zutphen, Netherlands
- Party: People's Party for Freedom and Democracy (from 2001)
- Children: 3 sons
- Education: University of Groningen (Bachelor of Business Administration, Master of Business Administration)
- Occupation: Politician · Civil servant · Businessman · Corporate director · Nonprofit director · Trade association executive · Academic administrator · Management consultant

Paul de Krom (born 10 February 1963) is a Dutch business executive and former politician of the People's Party for Freedom and Democracy (VVD). He has been CEO and Chairman of the Organisation for Applied Scientific Research from March 2015 till February 2022, and CEO and Chairman of the Energy Research Centre since 1 April 2018. He has also served as Chairman of the Distribution association since 3 April 2018.

De Krom was elected as a Member of the House of Representatives after the election of 2003, he served in the House of Representatives from 30 January 2003 until 14 October 2010. After the election of 2010 De Krom was appointed as State Secretary for Social Affairs and Employment in the Cabinet Rutte I, serving from 14 October 2010 until 5 November 2012.

After the fall of the Cabinet Rutte I De Krom announced his semi-retirement from national politics and didn't stand for the election of 2012.

== Decorations ==
Honours
Ribbon bar	Honour	Country	Date	Comment
	Knight of the Order of Orange-Nassau	Netherlands	7 December 2012	

Political offices
Preceded by Jetta Klijnsma	State Secretary for Social Affairs and Employment; 2010–2012	Succeeded by Jetta Klijnsma
Civic offices
Unknown	Executive Director of the Land Management Agency of the Ministry of Economic Affairs; 2014–2015	Office discontinued
Business positions
Preceded by Carel Paauwe	Chairman of the Distribution association 2018–present	Incumbent
Non-profit organization positions
Preceded by Hans Wiegel	Chairman of the Supervisory board of the Energy Research Centre; 2013–2015	Succeeded by Kees Linse
Preceded by Jan Willem Kelder	CEO and Chairman of the Organisation for Applied; Scientific Research; 2015–2022	Incumbent
Preceded by Pierre Timmermans	CEO and Chairman of the Energy Research Centre; 2018–present	Incumbent
Academic offices
Preceded by Maarten Rook	President of the University of Applied; Sciences Utrecht; 2014–2018	Succeeded by Jan Bogerd
