= Antoon Veerman =

Dutch politician (1916–1993)

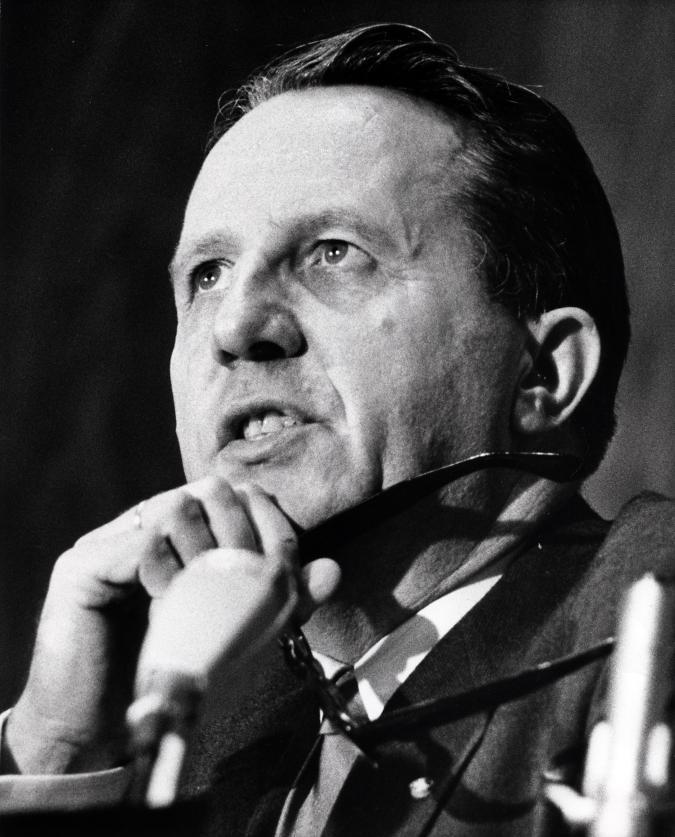
- Veerman in 1969

State Secretary for Education and Sciences
- In office 11 May 1973 – 11 September 1975 Serving with Ger Klein
- Prime Minister: Joop den Uyl
- Minister: Jos van Kemenade
- Preceded by: Kees Schelfhout
- Succeeded by: Klaas de Jong Ozn.

Member of the House of Representatives
- In office 3 April 1962 – 5 June 1963
- In office 18 April 1967 – 10 May 1971
- In office 4 November 1977 – 9 June 1981

Chairman of the Anti-Revolutionary Party
- In office 15 June 1968 – 11 May 1973
- Leader: Barend Biesheuvel (1973); Willem Aantjes (1973–1975)
- Preceded by: Anton Roosjen
- Succeeded by: Jan de Koning

Personal details
- Born: 11 October 1916 Bodegraven, Netherlands
- Died: 19 December 1993 (aged 77) Lage Mierde, Netherlands
- Party: Christian Democratic Appeal (from 1980)
- Other political affiliations: Anti-Revolutionary Party (until 1980)
- Spouse: Edith van Leeuwen
- Children: 7
- Occupation: Politician; Journalist

Antoon Veerman (11 October 1916 – 19 December 1993) was a Dutch politician of the defunct Anti-Revolutionary Party (ARP) party and later the Christian Democratic Appeal (CDA) party.

== Decorations ==
Honours
Ribbon bar	Honour	Country	Date	Comment
	Knight of the Order of the Netherlands Lion	Netherlands		
	Officer of the Order of Orange-Nassau	Netherlands		

Party political offices
Preceded by Anton Roosjen	Chairman of the Anti-Revolutionary Party; 1968–1973	Succeeded by Jan de Koning
Political offices
Preceded by Kees Schelfhout	State Secretary for Education and Sciences; 1973–1975	Succeeded by Klaas de Jong Ozn.
