= Agnes Mulder =

Dutch politician (born 1973)

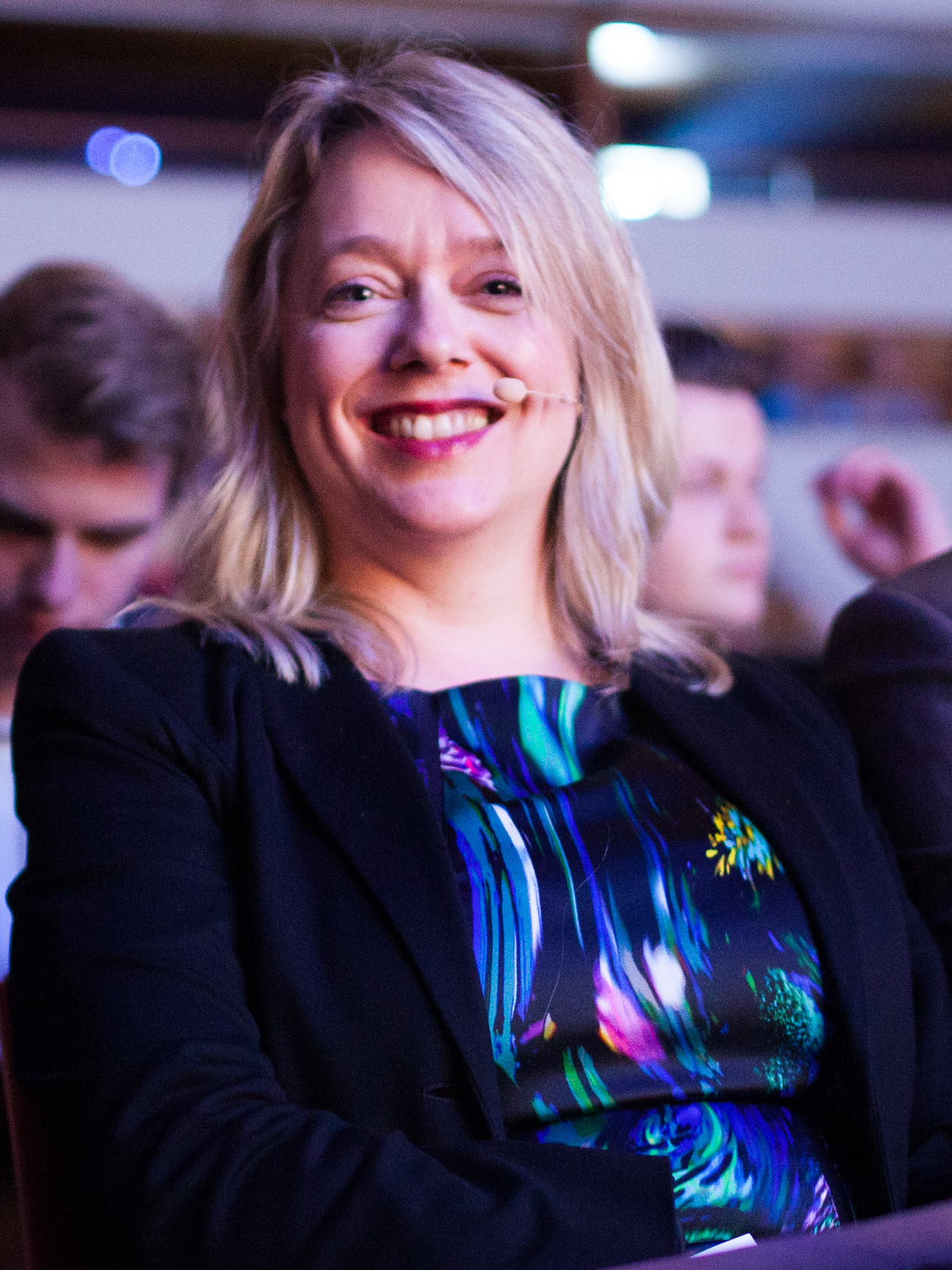

King's Commissioner of Drenthe
- Incumbent
- Assumed office 1 January 2026
- Monarch: Willem-Alexander
- Preceded by: Jetta Klijnsma

Member of the House of Representatives
- In office 20 September 2012 – 10 May 2023

Personal details
- Born: Agnes Henriëtte Mulder; 21 October 1973 (age 52) Hardenberg, Netherlands
- Party: Christian Democratic Appeal
- Education: University of Groningen
- Occupation: Politician

Agnes Henriëtte Mulder (born 21 October 1973) is a Dutch politician who has served as the King's Commissioner of Drenthe since January 2026. She was a member of the House of Representatives from 2012 till 2023.

A member of the Christian Democratic Appeal (CDA), she was previously elected to the municipal council of Assen in 2010, where she chaired the party group. Mulder started her political career as a member of the States Provincial of Drenthe, a position she held from 2003 to 2010. She is a member of the Protestant Church in the Netherlands (PKN).

== Electoral history ==
Electoral history of Inge van Dijk
Year	Body	Party	Pos.	Votes	Result		Ref.
Year	Body	Party	Pos.	Votes	Party seats	Individual	Ref.
2021	House of Representatives	Christian Democratic Appeal	8	5,736	15	Won	

Political offices
Preceded by Jetta Klijnsma	King's Commissioner of Drenthe; 2025–present	Incumbent
