= Louis van de Laar =

Dutch politician

His Excellency Louis van de Laar
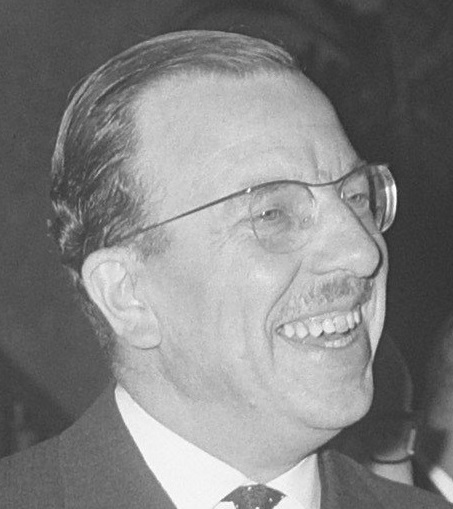
- Louis van de Laar in 1964

Mayor of Bergen op Zoom
- In office 16 October 1965 – 1 September 1981
- Preceded by: Leonard Peters
- Succeeded by: Pieter Zevenbergen

State Secretary for Education, Arts and Sciences
- In office 24 October 1963 – 14 April 1965 Serving with Hans Grosheide
- Prime Minister: Victor Marijnen
- Preceded by: Harry Janssen; Ynso Scholten
- Succeeded by: Hans Grosheide as State Secretary for Education and Sciences

Personal details
- Born: Louis Josephus Maria van de Laar; 24 December 1921 's-Hertogenbosch, Netherlands
- Died: 25 January 2004 (aged 82) Bergen op Zoom, Netherlands
- Party: Christian Democratic Appeal (from 1980)
- Other political affiliations: Catholic People's Party (until 1980)
- Education: Radboud University Nijmegen (Bachelor of Arts, Bachelor of Economics, Master of Arts, Master of Economics)
- Occupation: Politician · historian · teacher · author

Louis Josephus Maria van de Laar (24 December 1921 – 25 January 2004) was a Dutch politician of the defunct Catholic People's Party (KVP) now merged into the Christian Democratic Appeal (CDA) and historian.

== Education ==
Van de Laar attended the minor seminary in Sint-Michielsgestel and subsequently the Sint-Janslyceum (a gymnasium) in 's-Hertogenbosch. In 1939, he started studying at the Radboud University Nijmegen, where he obtained master's degrees in history and economics in 1947. He continued his studies in history from 1945 to 1946 at the Sorbonne and École pratique des hautes études (Paris).

== Career ==
After finishing his studies, van de Laar became a history teacher and then rector at several secondary schools. From 1963 to 1965, he was state secretary at the Ministry of Education, Culture, and Science in the Marijnen cabinet for the Catholic People's Party. Through this function, he became one of the founders of the Dutch Language Union.

In October 1965, he became mayor of Bergen op Zoom, where he remained until his retirement in 1981. During his mandate he succeeded in enticing Philip Morris and General Electric Plastics to build large production centres in Bergen op Zoom and initiated the restoration of the city palace, the Markiezenhof.

== Awards ==
Van de Laar received the following awards:

- Knight in the Order of the Netherlands Lion
- Grand Officer in the Order of Orange-Nassau
- Knight in the Order of St. Gregory the Great
- Krijgt de Taalunieprijs
