= Ynso Scholten =

Dutch politician

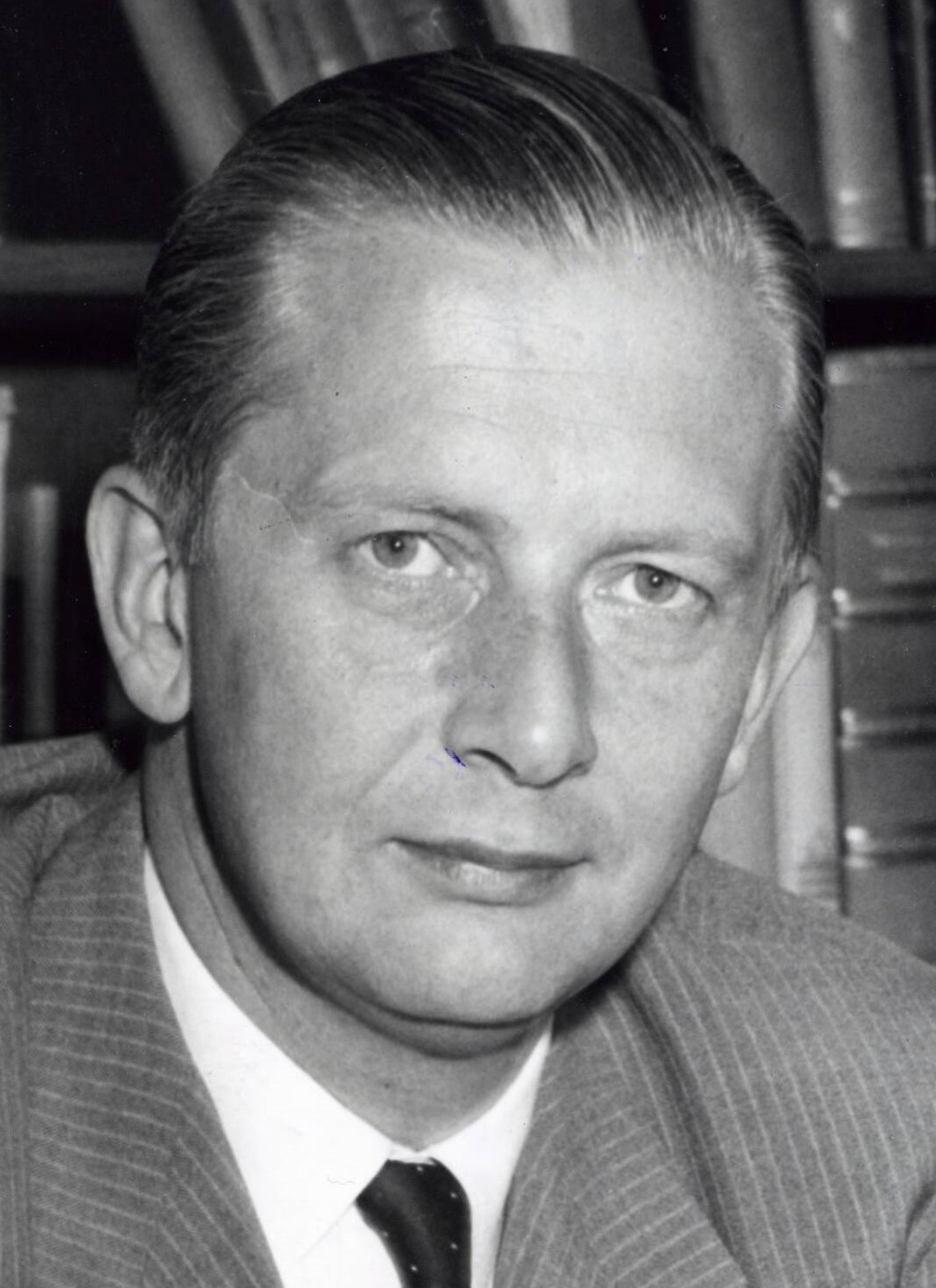
- Scholten in 1959

Minister of Justice
- In office 24 July 1963 – 14 April 1965
- Prime Minister: Victor Marijnen
- Preceded by: Albert Beerman
- Succeeded by: Ivo Samkalden

State Secretary for Education, Culture and Sciences
- In office 16 June 1959 – 24 July 1963 Serving with Gerard Stubenrouch (1959–1962); Harry Janssen (1962–1963)
- Prime Minister: Jan de Quay
- Preceded by: René Höppener
- Succeeded by: Hans Grosheide; Louis van de Laar

Personal details
- Born: Ynso Scholten; 1 February 1918 Amsterdam, Netherlands
- Died: 13 June 1984 (aged 66) The Hague, Netherlands
- Party: Christian Democratic Appeal (from 1980)
- Other political affiliations: Christian Historical Union (1959–1980)
- Education: Vrije Universiteit Amsterdam (Bachelor of Laws, Master of Laws)
- Occupation: Politician · Jurist · Lawyer

Ynso Scholten (1 February 1918 – 13 June 1984) was a Dutch politician of the defunct Christian Historical Union (CHU) later merged into the Christian Democratic Appeal (CDA) and lawyer.

== Decorations ==
Honours
Ribbon bar	Honour	Country	Date	Comment
	Commander of the Order of Orange-Nassau	Netherlands	20 April 1965	

Political offices
Preceded by René Höppener	State Secretary for Education, Culture and Sciences; 1963–1965; With: Gerard Stubenrouch (1959–1962); Harry Janssen (1962–1963)	Succeeded by Hans Grosheide
Preceded by René Höppener	State Secretary for Education, Culture and Sciences; 1963–1965; With: Gerard Stubenrouch (1959–1962); Harry Janssen (1962–1963)	Succeeded by Louis van de Laar
Preceded by Albert Beerman	Minister of Justice; 1963–1965	Succeeded by Ivo Samkalden
