= Kees Schelfhout =

Dutch politician (1918–1983)

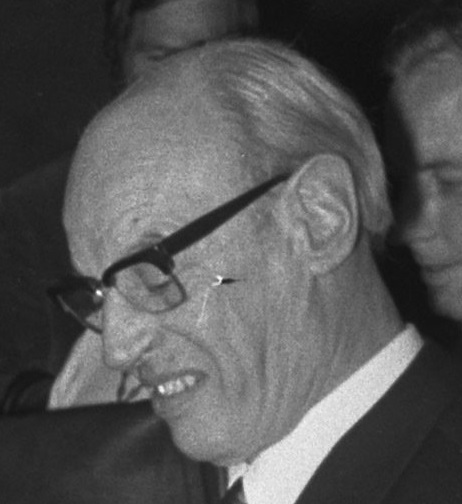
- Schelfhout in 1971

State Secretary for Education and Sciences
- In office 28 July 1971 – 9 August 1972
- Prime Minister: Barend Biesheuvel
- Minister: Mauk de Brauw
- Preceded by: Hans Grosheide
- Succeeded by: Himself
- In office 9 August 1972 – 11 May 1973
- Prime Minister: Barend Biesheuvel
- Minister: Chris van Veen
- Preceded by: Himself
- Succeeded by: Ger Klein; Antoon Veerman

Member of the Senate
- In office 16 September 1969 – 28 July 1971

Personal details
- Born: Cornelis Eduardus Schelfhout; 25 February 1918 Sint Jansteen, Netherlands
- Died: 3 March 1983 (aged 65) The Hague, Netherlands
- Party: Catholic People's Party
- Occupation: Politician

Cornelis Eduardus "Kees" Schelfhout (25 February 1918 – 3 March 1983) was a Dutch Engelandvaarder and politician of the Catholic People's Party (KVP).

Political offices
Preceded by Hans Grosheide	State Secretary for Education and Sciences; 1971–1972	Succeeded by Himself
Preceded by Himself	State Secretary for Education and Sciences; 1972–1973	Succeeded by Ger Klein; Antoon Veerman
