= Budget Memorandum (Netherlands) =

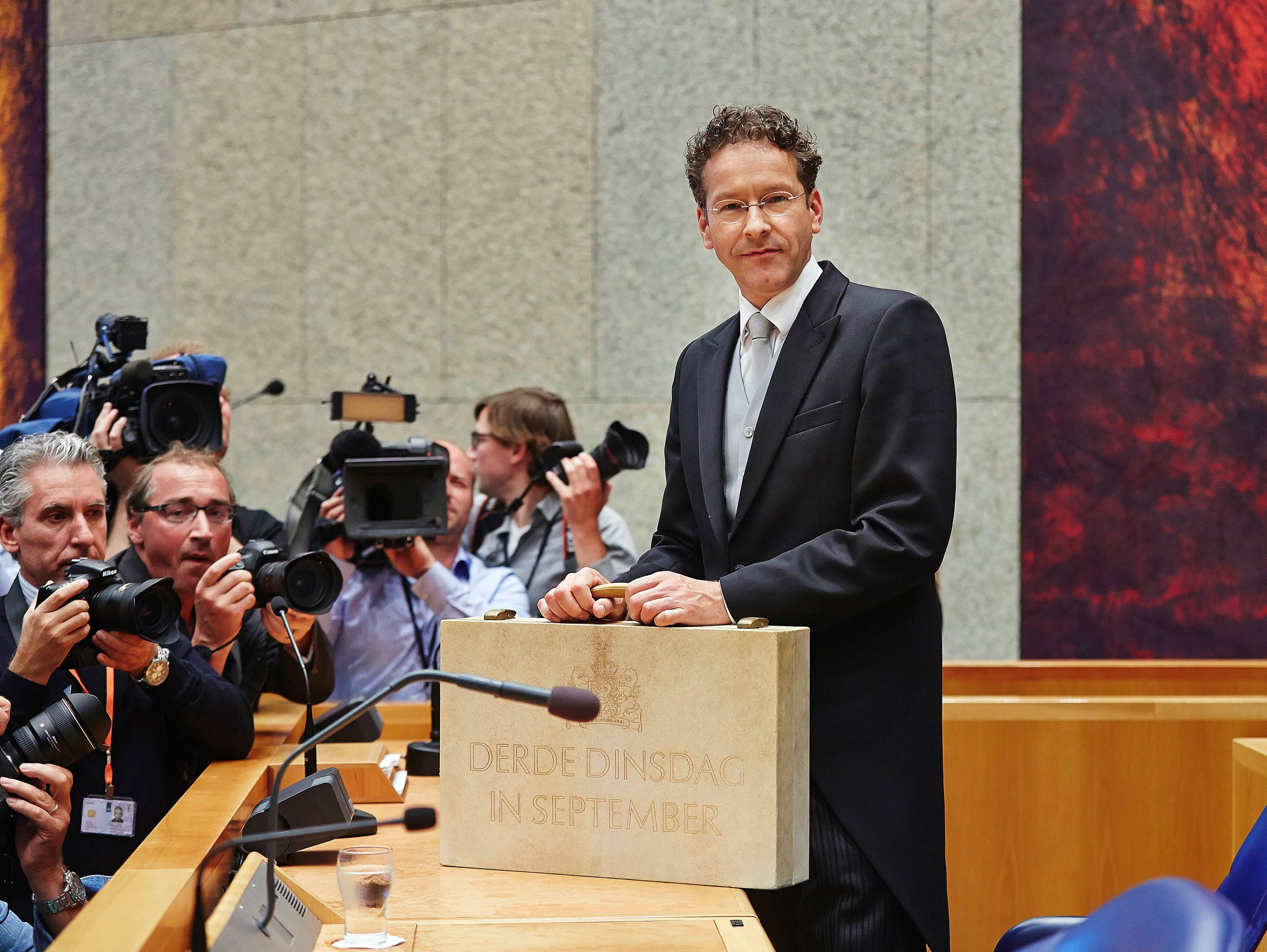
Finance Minister Dijsselbloem with the budget suitcase in the House, 2014.

The Budget Memorandum (Dutch: Miljoenennota, literally "Millions Bill") is a general explanation by the Government of the Netherlands of the expected revenues and expenses in the National Budget for a year.

After the king has given the Speech from the throne on Prinsjesdag (every third Tuesday in September), the Finance Minister offers the suitcase with the National Budget and the Budget Memorandum to the speaker of the House of Representatives.

== Contents ==
The Budget Memorandum describes the most important plans the cabinet has for the next year. This involves an explanation of the costs and influence these plans will have on citizens and companies. Furthermore, the Budget Memorandum also discusses the general situation of the economy of the Netherlands. An important topic is always public finance. Whenever there is a deficit, it will detail how big this deficit is, and how it will be financed.

== See also ==
- Accountability Day
