= Accountability Day =

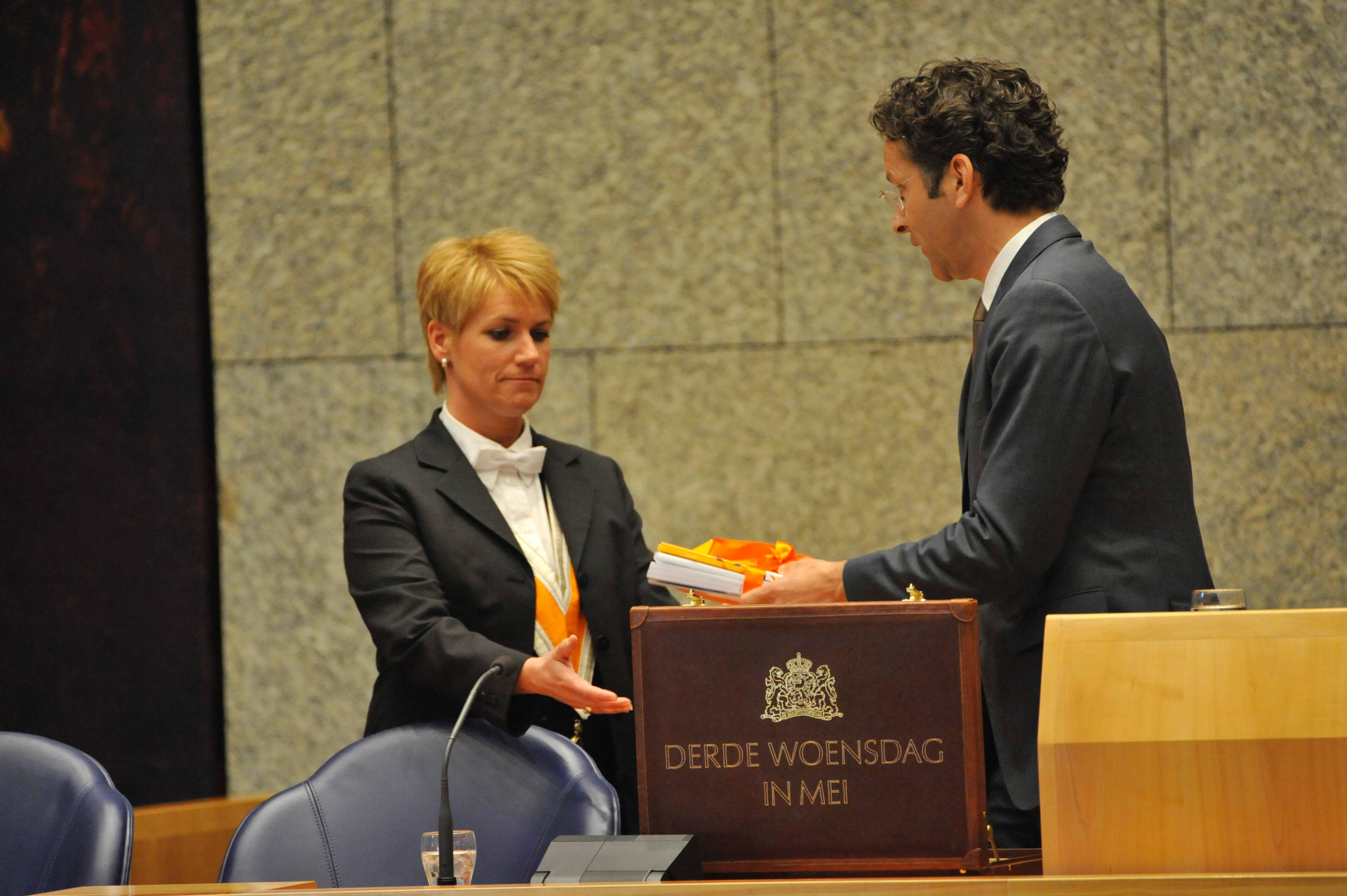
Accountability Day 2013 – Minister Dijsselbloem offers the 2012 Accountability files to a House aide.

'What happens on Accountability Day?' Infomercial of the Ministry of Finance, 2014 (English subtitles).

Accountability Day (Dutch: Verantwoordingsdag, popularly also referred to as (woensdag) gehaktdag, "Wednesday Mincing Day")) is the day in the Netherlands when the national government and ministries present their annual reports to the House of Representatives. On the same day, the Court of Audit publishes its report on the inspections of those annual reports. Accountability Day is held every year on the third Wednesday in May. The annual reports not only account for how much money has been spent and on what; the specific goals that were envisioned, and to what degree they have been achieved in the past year, are also discussed.

Accountability Day dates from 2000. Since then, the Finance Minister reports to the House personally. When doing so, a special suitcase is used, similar to the one carrying the budget plans (Miljoenennota) on Prinsjesdag, the third Tuesday in September. The suitcase is decorated with the Coat of arms of the Netherlands, and the text DERDE WOENSDAG IN MEI ("THIRD WEDNESDAY IN MAY") beneath it. Before 2000, the financial and ministerial annual reports - then referred to as "Financial Accountability" - were not sent to the House of Representatives until September. At the Parliament's prompting, this date has been brought forward, because MPs are too busy in autumn preparing the national budget debates for the next year to also invest time in the financial report of the previous year. This way, an Accountability Day refers to the Prinsjesdag of 1.5 years earlier. For example, on Accountability Day 2015, the Cabinet accounted for how much of the plans announced at Prinsjesdag 2013 had been achieved in 2014.

In 2004, the House approved of a motion requesting the Government to have all Cabinet members be present during the plenary debate on the national financial report the day after the third Wednesday in May.

== See also ==
- Budget Memorandum (Netherlands)
