= Bonrepas =

- Hamlet
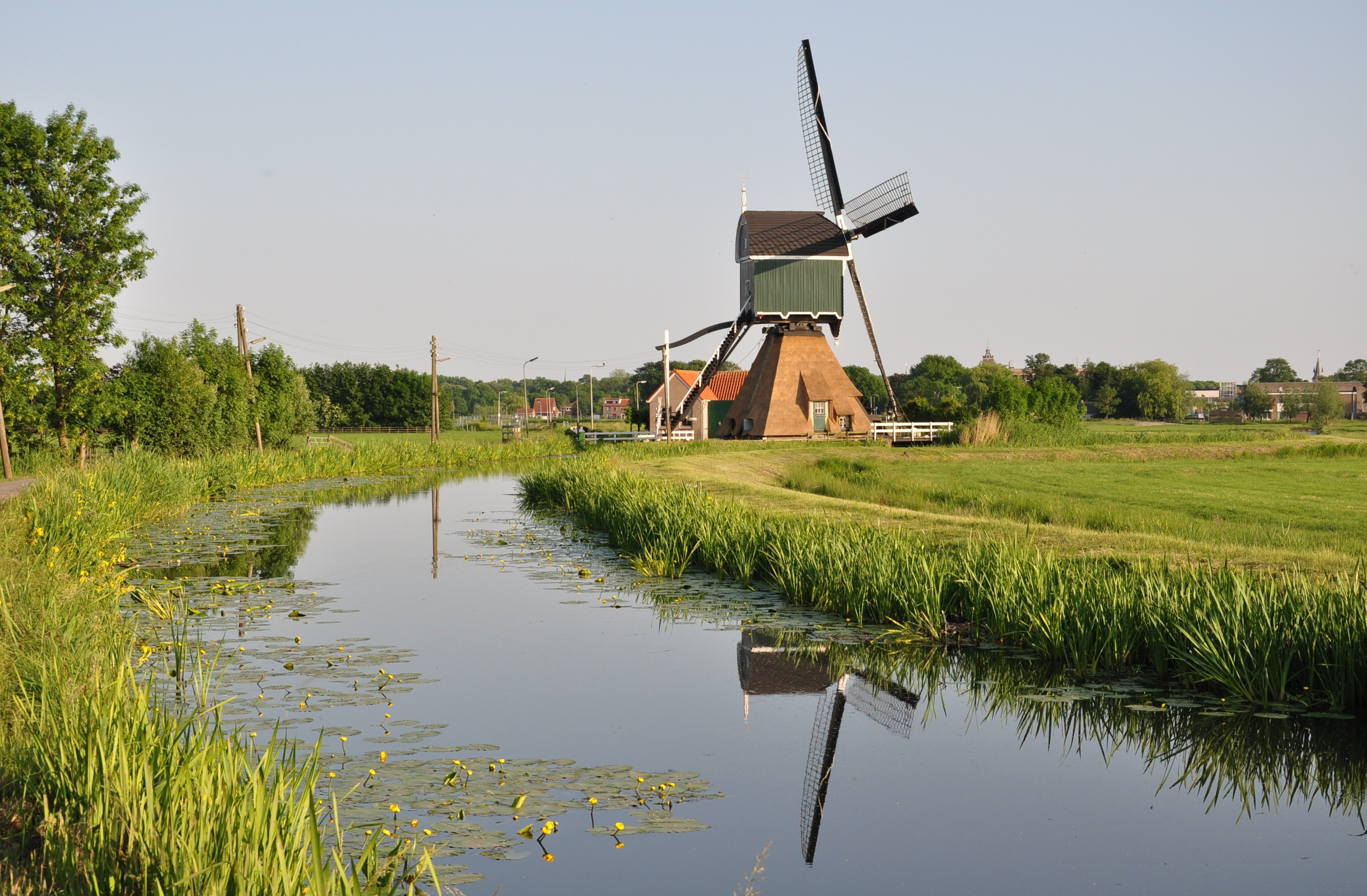
- The Bonrepas windmill

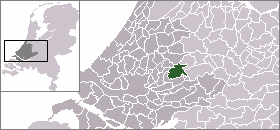

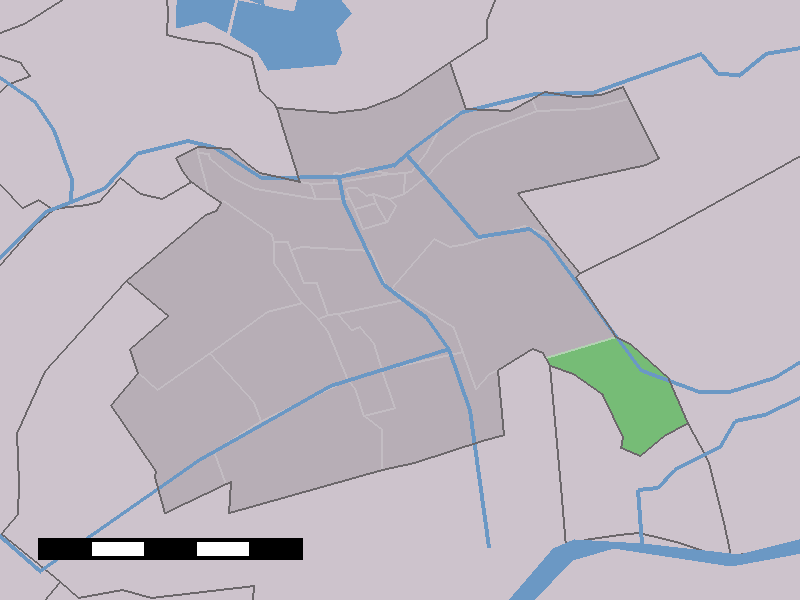
- Bonrepas in the former municipality of Vlist.
- Coordinates: 51°57′37″N 4°50′46″E
- Country: Netherlands
- Province: South Holland
- Municipality: Krimpenerwaard

Population (2007)
  - Total: 50
- Time zone: UTC+1 (CET)
  - Summer (DST): UTC+2 (CEST)

Bonrepas is a hamlet in the Dutch province of South Holland. It is a part of the municipality of Krimpenerwaard, and lies about 11 km southeast of Gouda.

The statistical area "Bonrepas", which also can include the surrounding countryside, has a population of around 120.

Until 2015, Bonrepas was part of Vlist.
