= Klaas de Jong Ozn. =

Dutch politician

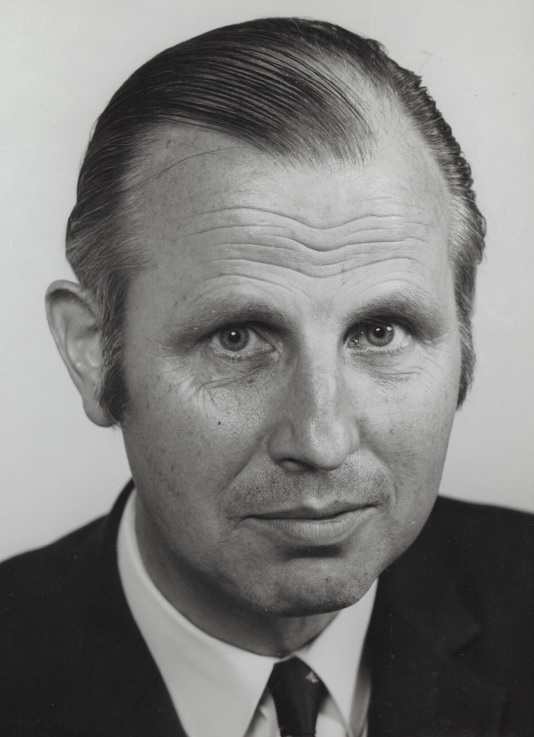
- De Jong in 1975

State Secretary for Education and Sciences
- In office 1 September 1975 – 19 December 1977 Serving with Ad Hermes
- Prime Minister: Joop den Uyl
- Preceded by: Antoon Veerman
- Succeeded by: Himself
- In office 19 December 1977 – 11 September 1981 Serving with Ad Hermes
- Prime Minister: Dries van Agt
- Preceded by: Himself
- Succeeded by: Wim Deetman

Personal details
- Born: Klaas de Jong Oebeles zoon 27 February 1926 Drachten, Netherlands
- Died: 28 February 2011 (aged 85) Sneek, Netherlands
- Party: Christian Democratic Appeal (from 1980)
- Other political affiliations: Anti-Revolutionary Party (until 1980)
- Spouse: Janke Hendrikje Ronner
- Occupation: Politician; Teacher; Writer

Klaas de Jong Ozn. (27 February 1926 – 28 February 2011) was a Dutch politician of the defunct Anti-Revolutionary Party (ARP) party and later the Christian Democratic Appeal (CDA) party.

Political offices
Preceded by Antoon Veerman	State Secretary for Education and Sciences; 1975–1977	Succeeded by Himself
Preceded by Himself	State Secretary for Education and Sciences; 1977–1981	Succeeded by Wim Deetman
