= Goejanverwellesluis =

Coordinates: 52.014°N 4.811°E

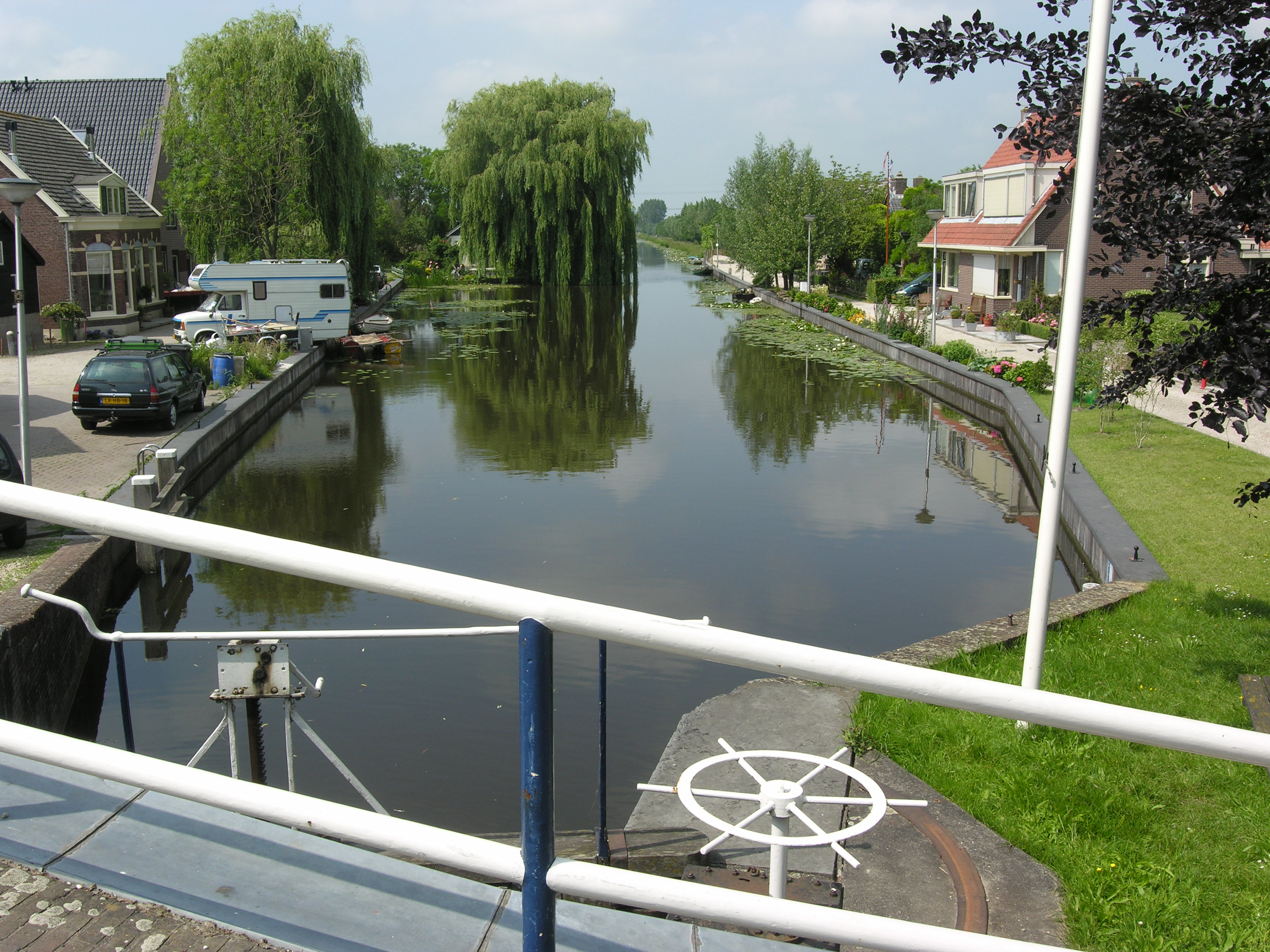
Goejanverwellesluis, Hekendorp, Netherlands.

The Goejanverwellesluis is a lock in Hekendorp, Netherlands. The 'Goejannen' - the men from the surrounding polders who went to sea - said their last farewells by this channel.

According to the tradition, Wilhelmina of Prussia, wife of stadholder William V was captured here on 28 June 1787 by the Patriots from Gouda. In reality, her entourage were arrested at Bonrepas on the river Vlist, on the way to Schoonhoven near Haastrecht. Wilhelmina was at a farm overhanging the Goejanverwellesluis, where Cornelis Johan de Lange, commander of the free corps of Gouda, had been billeted. Informed of her plans by the gentleman Martinus van Toulon, former bailiff of Gouda, the Commission of Defense stopped her from driving on to Gouda that night. The princess left the very same evening after 10pm in the direction of Schoonhoven and turned back to her spouse stadholder William V at Nijmegen. This event formed the main reason for the Prussians' raid into Holland, with Frederick William II of Prussia coming to his sister Wilhelmina's aid and so making possible William's return to the Hague. This raid led to an exodus of the Patriots from the United Republic of the Seven Netherlands in 1787.

A foot ferry at Goejanverwellesluis was replaced by the Wilhelmina van Pruisen Bridge in 1992.

== Literature ==
- Wildschut, A., Goejanverwellesluis; de strijd tussen patriotten en prinsgezinden, 1780-1787 (2005; ISBN 90-6550-450-8)
- Smit, dr.mr.J., Een regentendagboek uit de achttiende eeuw, Oudheidkundige kring "Die Goude", 1957
- Meddens-van Borselen, Drs. A., "Ik zal dit in uwe ogen doen druipen". Holland, page 197-206 (1987; ISSN 0166-2511)
- Meddens-van Borselen, Drs. A., National Archive of the Netherlands, No. 3.01.48, The archive of De Commissie van Defensie te Woerden, 1787
