= Henk Koning =

Dutch politician (1933–2016)

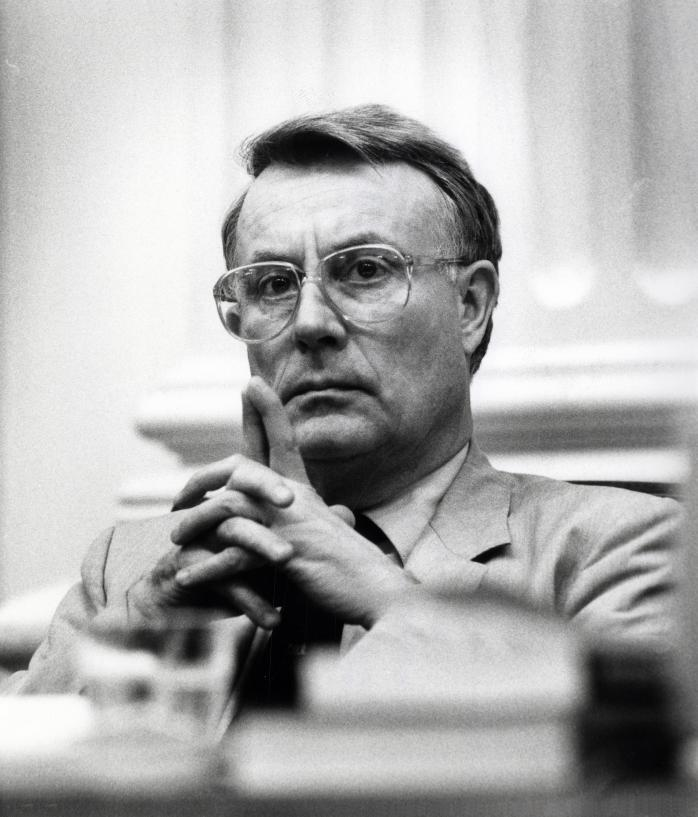
- Koning in 1985

President of the Court of Audit
- In office 1 November 1991 – 1 April 1999
- Preceded by: Frans Kordes
- Succeeded by: Saskia Stuiveling

State Secretary for Finance
- In office 5 November 1982 – 7 November 1989
- Prime Minister: Ruud Lubbers
- Preceded by: Hans Kombrink
- Succeeded by: Marius van Amelsvoort

State Secretary for the Interior
- In office 28 December 1977 – 11 September 1981
- Prime Minister: Dries van Agt
- Preceded by: Wim Polak
- Succeeded by: Saskia Stuiveling; Gerard van Leijenhorst

Member of the House of Representatives
- In office 14 September 1989 – 1 November 1991
- In office 3 June 1986 – 14 July 1986
- In office 25 August 1981 – 5 November 1982
- In office 23 February 1967 – 28 December 1977
- Parliamentary group: People's Party for Freedom and Democracy

Personal details
- Born: Hendrik Elle Koning; 3 June 1933 Beilen, Netherlands
- Died: 31 December 2016 (aged 83) The Hague, Netherlands
- Party: People's Party for Freedom and Democracy (from 1962)
- Education: Leiden University (Bachelor of Laws, Master of Laws)
- Occupation: Politician · Civil servant · Economist · Jurist · Tax collector · Corporate director · Nonprofit director · Art collector

Hendrik Elle "Henk" Koning (7 June 1933 – 31 December 2016) was a Dutch politician of the People's Party for Freedom and Democracy (VVD) and economist.

== Biography ==
Koning attended the Praedinius Gymnasium in Groningen from April 1946 until May 1952 and applied at the National Tax Academy in Rotterdam in June 1952 and simultaneously applied at the Leiden University in July 1952 majoring in Tax law and obtaining a Bachelor of Laws degree in June 1954 before graduating with a Master of Laws degree in July 1958. Koning worked as a civil servant for Tax and Customs Administration of the Ministry of Finance from August 1958 until February 1967. Koning served on the Provincial-Council of South Holland from 2 June 1966 until 4 January 1968.

Koning was elected as a Member of the House of Representatives after the election of 1967, taking office on 23 February 1967 serving as a frontbencher and spokesperson for Law enforcement and Transport. Koning also served on the Municipal Council of Rotterdam from March 1971 until May 1974, from April 1976 until December 1977 and from March 1980 until November 1982. After the election of 1977 Koning was appointed as State Secretary for the Interior in the Cabinet Van Agt-Wiegel, taking office on 28 December 1977. After the election of 1981 Koning returned as a Member of the House of Representatives, taking office on 25 August 1981 serving as a frontbencher and the de facto Whip. The Cabinet Van Agt-Wiegel was replaced by the Cabinet Van Agt II after the cabinet formation of 1981 on 11 September 1981. After the election of 1982 Koning was appointed as State Secretary for Finance in the Cabinet Lubbers I, taking office on 5 November 1982. After the election of 1986 Koning again returned as a Member of the House of Representatives, taking office on 3 June 1986. Following the cabinet formation of 1986 Koning continued as State Secretary for Finance in the Cabinet Lubbers II, taking office on 14 July 1986. The Cabinet Lubbers II fell on 3 May 1989 following a disagreement in the coalition about the increase of tariffs and excises and continued to serve in a demissionary capacity. After the election of 1989 Koning once again returned as a Member of the House of Representatives, taking office on 14 September 1989 serving as a frontbencher chairing the parliamentary committee for Finances and spokesperson for Finances and deputy spokesperson for Economic Affairs. The Cabinet Lubbers III was replaced by the Cabinet Lubbers III after the cabinet formation of 1989 on 7 November 1989.

In October 1991 Koning was nominated as President of the Court of Audit, he resigned as Member of the House of Representatives the same day he was installed as president, serving from 1 November 1991 until 1 April 1999.

Koning retired after spending 32 years in national politics and became active in the private sector and public sector and occupied numerous seats as a corporate director and nonprofit director on several boards of directors and supervisory boards (ING Group, DSM company, Randstad NV, Den Haan Rotterdam B.V., Prince Bernhard Culture Foundation, Maritime Museum Rotterdam and the Energy Research Centre) and served on several state commissions and councils on behalf of the government (Public Pension Funds PFZW, Cadastre Agency and Statistics Netherlands).

== Decorations ==
Honours
Ribbon bar	Honour	Country	Date	Comment
	Knight of the Order of the Holy Sepulchre	Holy See	17 April 1979	
	Knight of the Order of the Netherlands Lion	Netherlands	26 October 1981	
	Grand Officer of the Order of Leopold II	Belgium	15 May 1986	
	Commander of the Order of Merit	Germany	12 September 1988	
	Grand Officer of the Order of Orange-Nassau	Netherlands	20 November 1989	
	Knight Commander of the Order of St. Gregory the Great	Holy See	1 May 1994	

Political offices
Preceded by Wim Polak	State Secretary for the Interior; 1977–1981	Succeeded by Saskia Stuiveling
Preceded by Wim Polak	State Secretary for the Interior; 1977–1981	Succeeded by Gerard van Leijenhorst
Preceded by Hans Kombrink	State Secretary for Finance; 1982–1989	Succeeded by Marius van Amelsvoort
Civic offices
Preceded by Frans Kordes	President of the Court of Audit; 1991–1999	Succeeded by Saskia Stuiveling
