= Ginjaar =

Ginjaar is a Dutch surname. Notable people with the surname include:

- Leendert Ginjaar (1928–2003), Dutch politician
- Nell Ginjaar-Maas (1931–2012), Dutch politician
