= De Molen =

Coordinates: 51°39′39.09″N 5°3′10.88″E

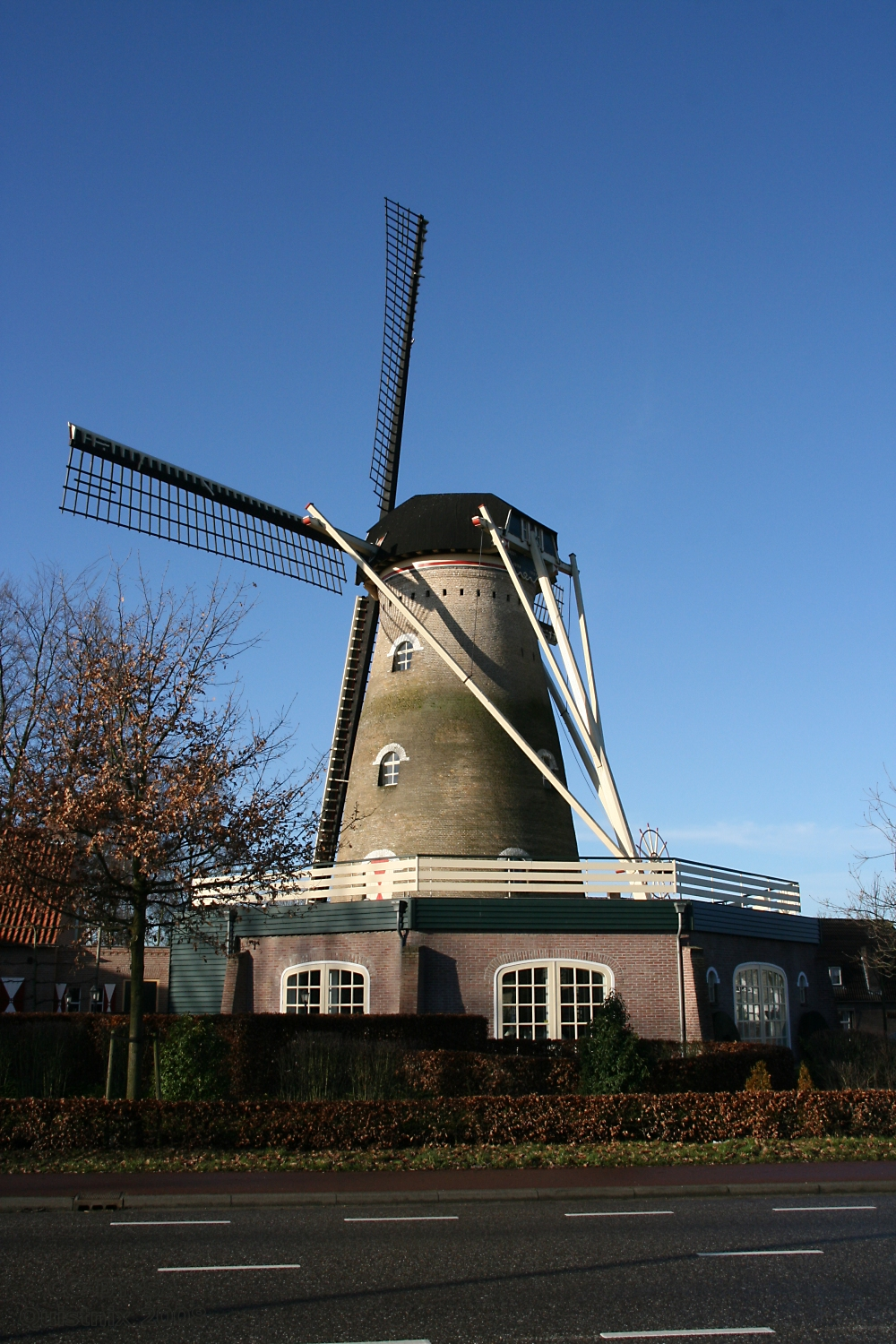
- Interactive map of De Molen

Restaurant information
- Established: 2000
- Closed: 10 July 2014
- Head chef: Wouter van Laarhoven
- Food type: French
- Rating: Michelin Guide
- Location: Vaartstraat 102, Kaatsheuvel, 5171 JG, Netherlands
- Seating capacity: 90
- Website: Official website

De Molen is a defunct restaurant in Kaatsheuvel, Netherlands. It was a fine dining restaurant that was awarded one Michelin star in 2008 and retained that rating until 2014. On 14 July 2014 it was announced that the restaurant was closed with immediate effect due to bankruptcy. The economic crisis and the expensive location proved fatal for the restaurant.

In 2013, GaultMillau awarded the restaurant 16 out of 20 points.

Head chef of De Molen was Wouter van Laarhoven. Maître Jerry van der Pluijm was the owner of the restaurant, which he opened in 2000.

De restaurant was housed in the former storage area of corn mill De Couwenbergh. This mill was built in 1849 but burned down and was repaired in 1881. In 1944, the mill was renewed only to be severely damaged in October 1944 during the liberation of Kaatsheuvel. Due to lack of funds, the mill was dismantled in 1950 and the milling was done with power of a diesel engine. The mill was sold in 1994 and the new owner wanted to have a windmill again. After a long and costly renovation, the mill was working again in 1998.

== See also ==
- List of Michelin starred restaurants in the Netherlands
