= DHR =

DHR may stand for:

- Department of Health Research, to promote research activities in India. Under Ministry of Health and Family Welfare
- Dlg homologous region in biochemistry
- Digital Hardcore Recordings, a record label based in London
- Danaher Corporation, an American diversified conglomerate
- Den Haan Rotterdam B.V., a Dutch manufacturer of nautical lanterns, searchlights and air horns
- Darjeeling Himalayan Railway, West Bengal, India
- Dhr.; De Heer, Dutch for mister
- Digital Human Resources, a start-up company at Saint-Petersburg
- Device History Record
- Bureau of Disaster and Humanitarian Response, in the U.S. Department of State
