= Hans Kombrink =

Dutch politician

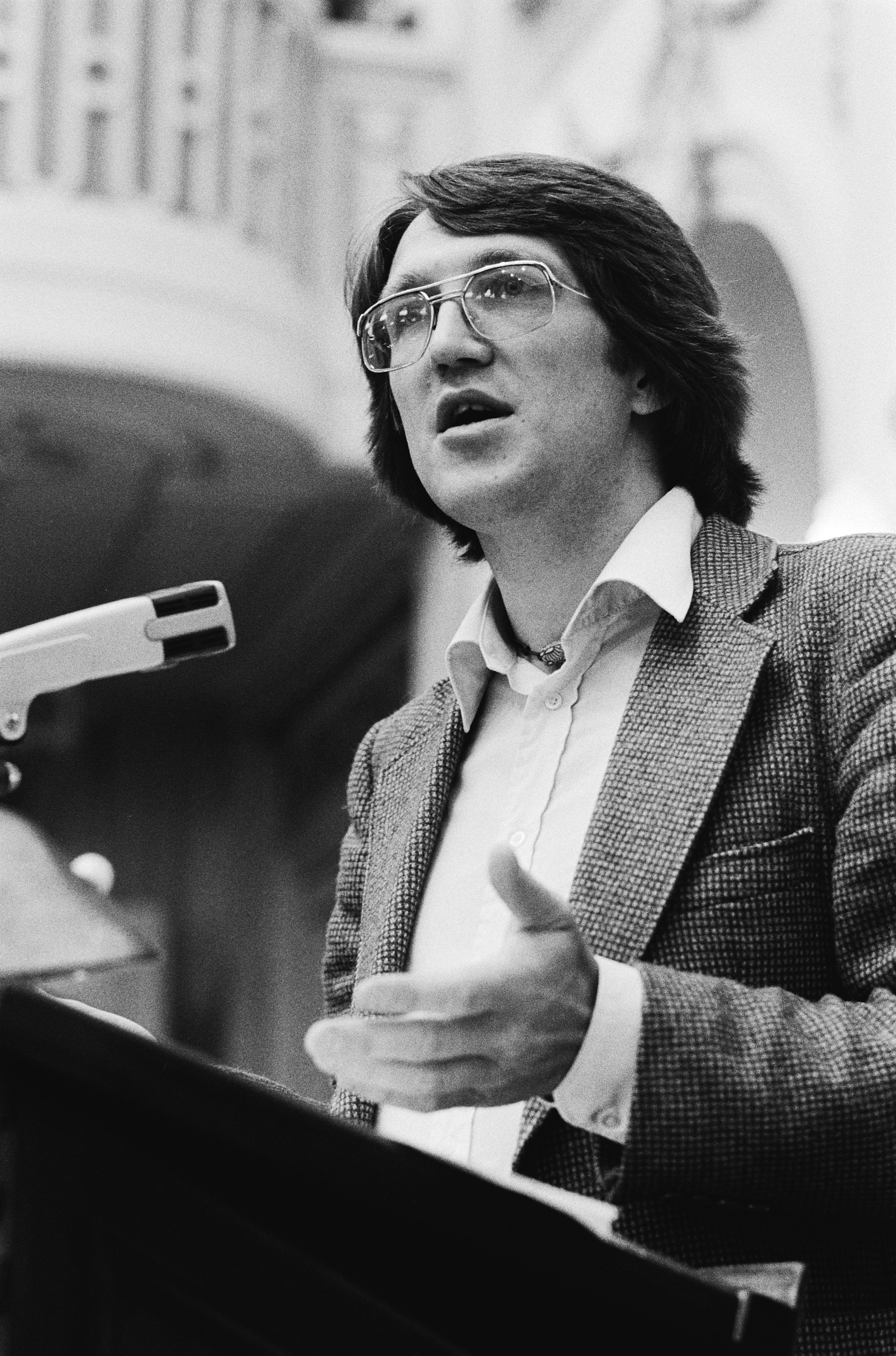
- Kombrink in 1980

State Secretary for Finance
- In office 11 September 1981 – 29 May 1982
- Prime Minister: Dries van Agt
- Minister: Fons van der Stee
- Preceded by: Marius van Amelsvoort
- Succeeded by: Henk Koning

Member of the House of Representatives
- In office 7 December 1972 – 10 September 1981; 16 September 1982 – 30 April 1990

Mayor of Zaanstad
- In office 1 July 2004 – 1 January 2005
- Preceded by: Ruud Vreeman
- Succeeded by: Henry Meijdam

Personal details
- Born: Hans Frederik Kombrink; 22 November 1946 Steenwijk, Netherlands
- Party: Labour Party (PvdA)
- Occupation: Politician

Johan Carel "Hans" Kombrink (born 22 November 1946) is a former Dutch politician for the Labour Party (PvdA).

== Decorations ==
Honours
Ribbon bar	Honour	Country	Date	Comment
	Knight of the Order of Orange-Nassau	Netherlands	29 April 2004	

Political offices
Preceded by Marius van Amelsvoort	State Secretary for Finance; 1981–1982	Succeeded by Henk Koning
