= Marius van Amelsvoort =

Dutch politician and diplomat (1930–2006)

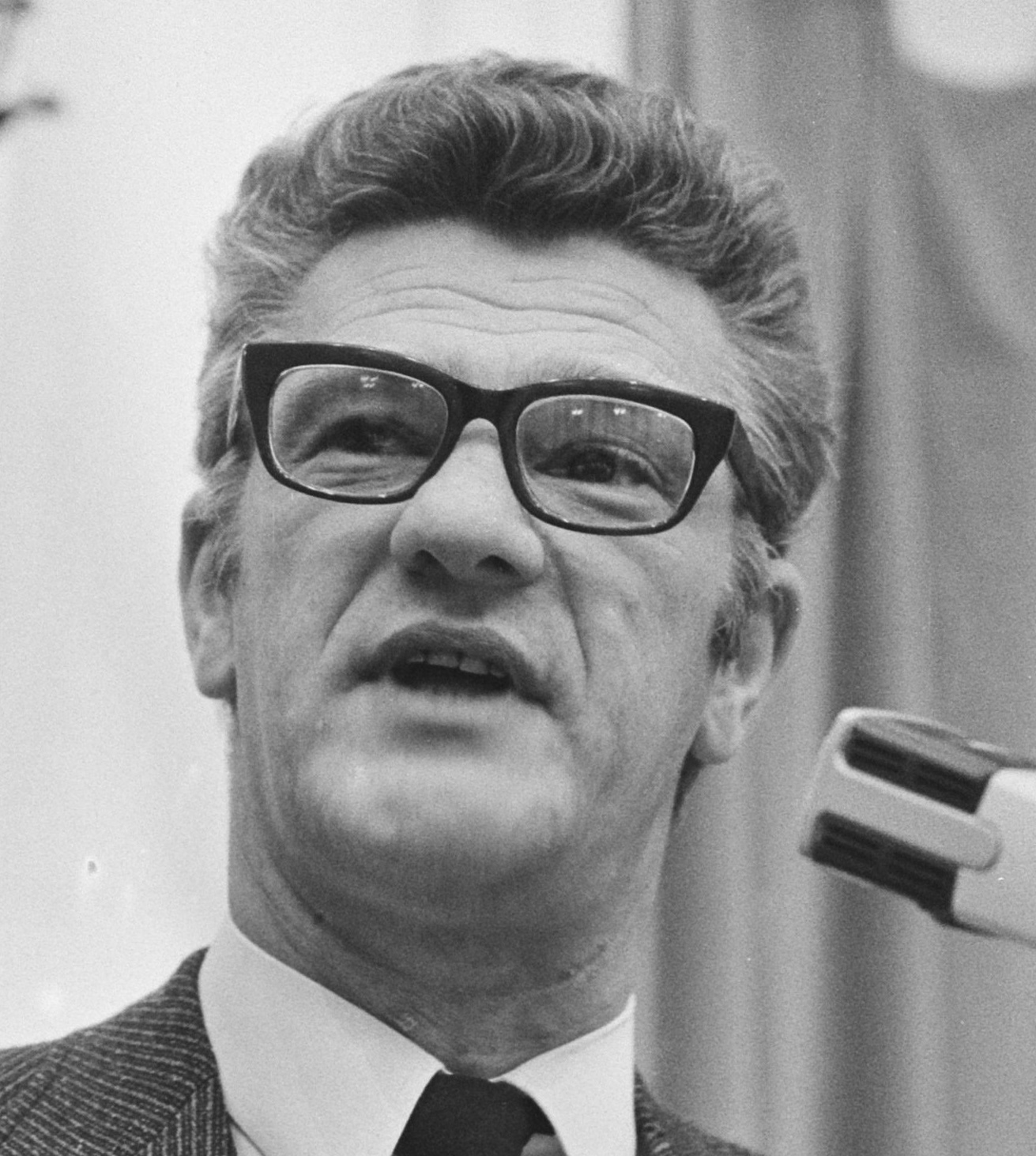
- Marius van Amelsvoort in 1974

State Secretary for the Interior
- In office 8 November 1982 – 14 July 1986
- Prime Minister: Ruud Lubbers
- Preceded by: Gerard van Leijenhorst
- Succeeded by: Dieuwke de Graaff-Nauta

State Secretary for Finance
- In office 7 November 1989 – 22 August 1994
- Prime Minister: Ruud Lubbers
- Preceded by: Henk Koning
- Succeeded by: Willem Vermeend
- In office 16 April 1980 – 11 September 1981
- Prime Minister: Dries van Agt
- Preceded by: Ad Nooteboom
- Succeeded by: Hans Kombrink

Member of the House of Representatives
- In office 3 June 1986 – 7 November 1989
- In office 10 June 1981 – 8 November 1982
- In office 15 September 1977 – 16 April 1980
- In office 28 May 1973 – 8 June 1977
- In office 3 August 1971 – 7 December 1972
- Parliamentary group: Christian Democratic Appeal (1980–1989); Catholic People's Party (1972–1980)

Member of the European Parliament
- In office 9 March 1970 – 13 September 1971
- Parliamentary group: Christian Democratic Group
- Constituency: Netherlands

Member of the Senate
- In office 16 September 1969 – 10 May 1971
- Parliamentary group: Catholic People's Party

Personal details
- Born: Marius Johannes Josephus van Amelsvoort; 29 August 1930 Kaatsheuvel, Netherlands
- Died: 30 May 2006 (aged 75) Veldhoven, Netherlands
- Party: Christian Democratic Appeal (from 1980)
- Other political affiliations: Catholic People's Party (until 1980)
- Spouse: Henriëtte Dirks (m. 1960)
- Education: Tilburg Catholic Economic University (Bachelor of Economics, Master of Economics)
- Occupation: Politician · Civil servant · Diplomat · Economist · Businessman · Banker · Accountant · Corporate director · Nonprofit director · Trade association executive · Lobbyist

Marius Johannes Josephus van Amelsvoort (29 August 1930 – 30 May 2006) was a Dutch politician and diplomat of the defunct Catholic People's Party (KVP) party and later the Christian Democratic Appeal (CDA) party and economist.

Van Amelsvoort applied at the Tilburg Catholic Economic University in July 1949 majoring in Economics and obtaining a Bachelor of Economics degree in June 1951 before graduating with a Master of Economics degree in July 1955. Van Amelsvoort worked as a civil servant for the Diplomatic service of the Ministry of Foreign Affairs from September 1955 until April 1960 and as an Attaché at the Embassy in Washington, D.C. from February 1956 until April 1960. Van Amelsvoort worked as an accountant for the Rabobank in Eindhoven from April 1960 until August 1961 as a branch manager in Eindhoven from August 1961 until May 1973.

Van Amelsvoort was elected as a Member of the Senate after the Senate election of 1969, serving from 16 September 1969 until 10 May 1971 as a backbencher. Van Amelsvoort was selected as a Member of the European Parliament and dual served in those positions, taking office on 9 March 1970. Van Amelsvoort became a Member of the House of Representatives after Roelof Nelissen was appointed as Deputy Prime Minister and Minister of Finance in the Cabinet Biesheuvel I after the election of 1971, serving from 3 August 1971 until 7 December 1972. Van Amelsvoort returned as a Member of the House of Representatives after Tiemen Brouwer was appointed as Minister of Agriculture and Fisheries in the Cabinet Den Uyl after the election of 1972, serving from 28 May 1973 until 8 June 1977. Van Amelsvoort again returned as a Member of the House of Representatives after Jaap Boersma resigned because he was still serving as Minister of Social Affairs in the Cabinet Den Uyl and because of dualism customs in the constitutional convention of Dutch politics he couldn't serve a dual mandate, taking office on 15 September 1977 serving as a frontbencher and deputy spokesperson for Finances. Van Amelsvoort was appointed as State Secretary for Finance in the Cabinet Van Agt-Wiegel following the resignation of Ad Nooteboom, taking office on 16 April 1980. After the election of 1981 Van Amelsvoort once again returned as a Member of the House of Representatives, taking office on 10 June 1981. Following the cabinet formation of 1981 Van Amelsvoort was not giving a cabinet post in the new cabinet, the Cabinet Van Agt-Wiegel was replaced by the Cabinet Van Agt II on 11 September 1981 and he continued to serve in the House of Representatives as a frontbencher and spokesperson for Finances. After the election of 1982 Van Amelsvoort was appointed as State Secretary for the Interior in the Cabinet Lubbers I, taking office on 8 November 1982. After the election of 1986 Van Amelsvoort again returned as a Member of the House of Representatives, taking office on 3 June 1986. Following the cabinet formation of 1986 Van Amelsvoort was not giving a cabinet post in the new cabinet, the Cabinet Lubbers I was replaced by the Cabinet Lubbers II on 14 July 1986 and he again continued to serve in the House of Representatives as a frontbencher chairing the parliamentary committee for Finances and spokesperson for Economic Affairs. After the election of 1989 Van Amelsvoort was again appointed as State Secretary for Finance in the Cabinet Lubbers III, taking office on 7 November 1989. In November 1993 Van Amelsvoort announced his retirement from national politics and that he wouldn't stand for the election of 1994. The Cabinet Lubbers III was replaced by the Cabinet Kok I following the cabinet formation of 1994 on 22 August 1994.

Van Amelsvoort semi-retired after spending 25 years in national politics and became active in the public sector and occupied numerous seats as a corporate director and nonprofit director on several boards of directors and supervisory boards and as an advocate and lobbyist for Pensioners' interests. Van Amelsvoort also worked as a trade association executive for the Catholic Senior Citizens association (KBO) serving as Chairman of the Executive Board from 1 February 1995 until 30 May 2003.

Van Amelsvoort was known for his abilities as a debater and policy wonk. Van Amelsvoort continued to comment on political affairs until his death from a cerebrovascular disease at the age of 75.

== Biography ==
=== Early life ===
He studied economics at the Tilburg University in Tilburg, and worked for several years at the Dutch embassy in the United States. Then he worked a long time in the banking sector as was a Board Member of the First Chamber of the CSF in which he acted as a spokesman for financial affairs.

=== Politics ===
After a brief interlude in the European Parliament followed from 1971 to 1980 a member of the Second Chamber. In the first period he was Spokesman on Development and Foreign Affairs, and in 1973 he turned down a post as Minister of Agriculture and Fisheries. Although he retired in 1994, from 1995 to 2003 he was President of the Union of Catholic Federal Elderly (CBE) which was in still in direct contact with his party, the CDA.

== Personal ==
Van Amelsvoort was seriously ill from 2003, and died in May 2006 at 75 years of age.

== Decorations ==
Honours
Ribbon bar	Honour	Country	Date	Comment
	Knight of the Order of the Netherlands Lion	Netherlands	26 October 1981	
	Knight of the Order of the Holy Sepulchre	Holy See	18 September 1982	
	Commander of the Order of Leopold II	Belgium	30 May 1985	
	Grand Officer of the Order of Orange-Nassau	Netherlands	8 October 1994	Elevated from Commander (26 August 1986)

Political offices
Preceded by Ad Nooteboom	State Secretary for Finance; 1980–1981; 1989–1994	Succeeded by Hans Kombrink
Preceded by Henk Koning	State Secretary for Finance; 1980–1981; 1989–1994	Succeeded by Willem Vermeend
Preceded by Gerard van Leijenhorst	State Secretary for the Interior; 1982–1986	Succeeded by Dieuwke de Graaff-Nauta
Non-profit organization positions
Unknown	Chairman of the Executive Board of the Catholic Senior Citizens association 1995–2003	Unknown
