= Kaatsheuvel =

- Village
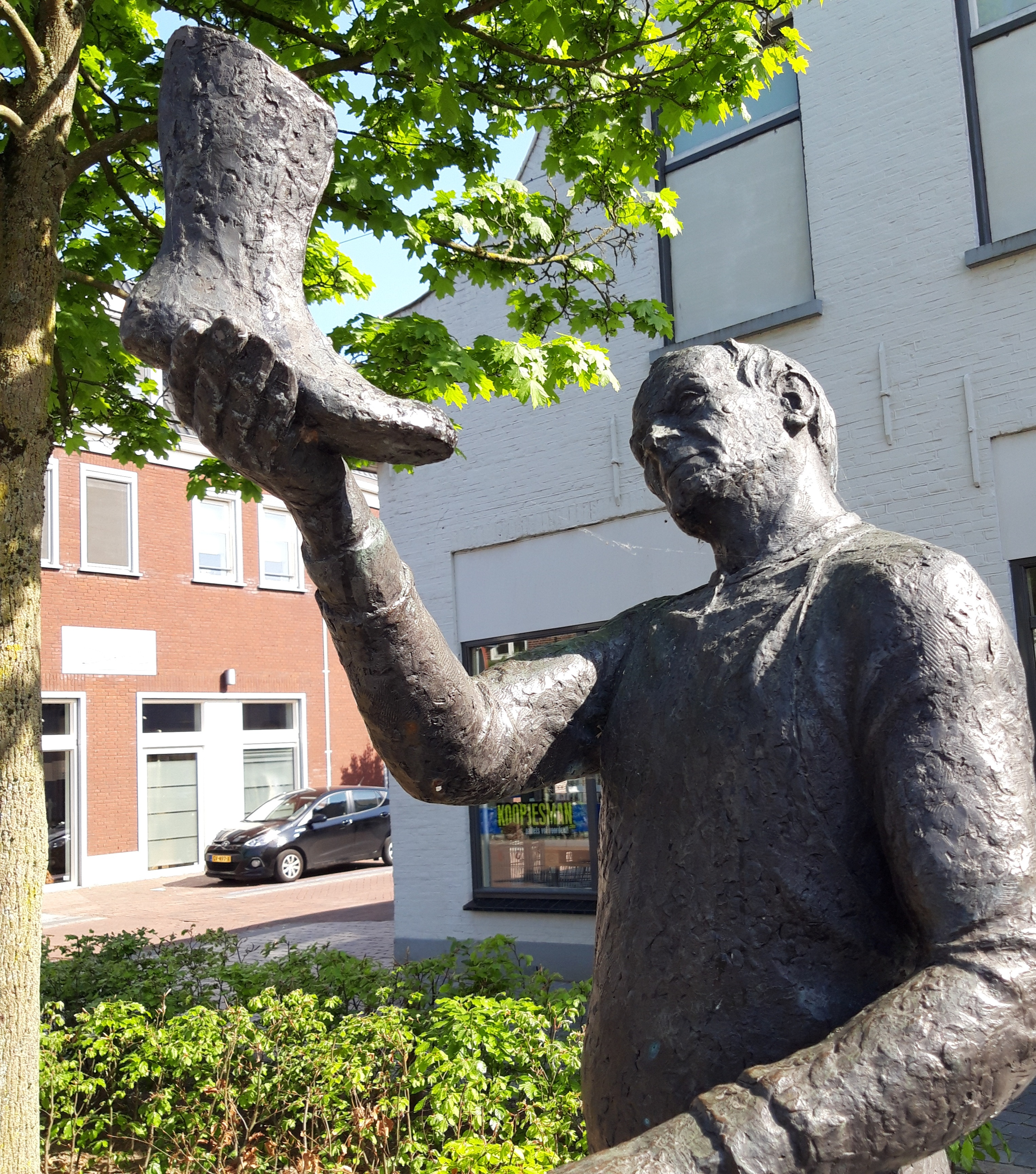
- Master Shoemaker Monument, Kaatsheuvel and the surrounding area was the shoe region of the Netherlands.

- Location within North Brabant Location within Netherlands
- Coordinates: 51°40′N 5°04′E
- Country: Netherlands
- Province: North Brabant
- Municipality: Loon op Zand

Population (1 January 2007)
  - Total: 16,600
  - Density: 706/km^{2} (1,830/sq mi)
- Source: CBS, Statline.
- Time zone: UTC+1 (CET)
  - Summer (DST): UTC+2 (CEST)

Kaatsheuvel (Dutch pronunciation: [ˈkaːtsˌɦøːvəl]) is a town in the province of North Brabant, Netherlands situated along highways N261 and N628. With a population of roughly 16,600, it is the largest town in and the capital of the municipality of Loon op Zand, which also consists of the villages of De Moer and Loon op Zand.

As Kaatsheuvel is a municipality capital, it has a town hall, located in the town centre. The town hall was torn down in 2010 as part of an ambitious plan to build a lively new town centre. A new town centre has been built, with the title Bruisend Dorpshart (Sparkling Village's Heart). Kaatsheuvel is internationally known for the Efteling theme park and as a gateway to National Park Loonse en Drunense Duinen.

== History ==
=== 13th and 14th century: Duke of Brabant and Lord of Venloon ===
The Netherlands traditionally consisted of seven provinces. The current province of North Brabant, in which Kaatsheuvel is located, used to be a stand-alone Duchy. The Duchy consisted of a large area with the most important cities: Brussels, 's-Hertogenbosch, Antwerp, Breda, Leuven and Maastricht. Under the leadership of the Duke and his counts, these large cities were supplied by the countryside. Although the oldest source speaks of 'Kaatsheuvel' dating from the 14th century, Venloon, the country now known as Loon op Zand, Kaatsheuvel and De Moer was already mentioned in the year 1233. In 1269 "the village of Venloon with its moors, nuts and wild lands" was loaned by Jan I van Brabant to Willem van Horne. This gave Venloon its first landlord and "fiefdom Venloon" was born.

=== 14th century: Peat cutters ===
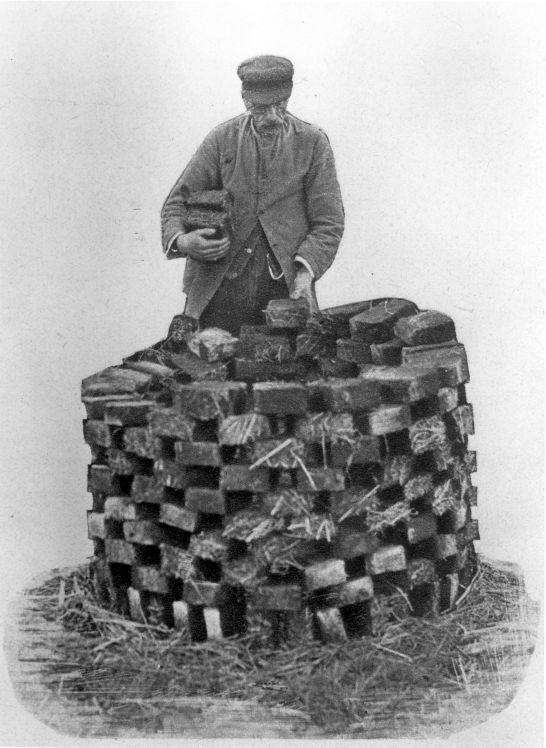
A Peat-cutter

In the 14th century there was an economic growth in Heerlijkheid Venloon. The peat soil turned out to be very suitable for peat extraction. Peat was a type of soil that could serve as a fuel to heat houses. The habitable area of Venloon grew further and further, creating different communities. That is also how the Kaatsheuvel community came into being. The main task of the inhabitants was peat stabbing. This meant that the peat soil had to be pulled out of the soil, dried, processed and transported.

=== 15th century: Farmers and hunters ===
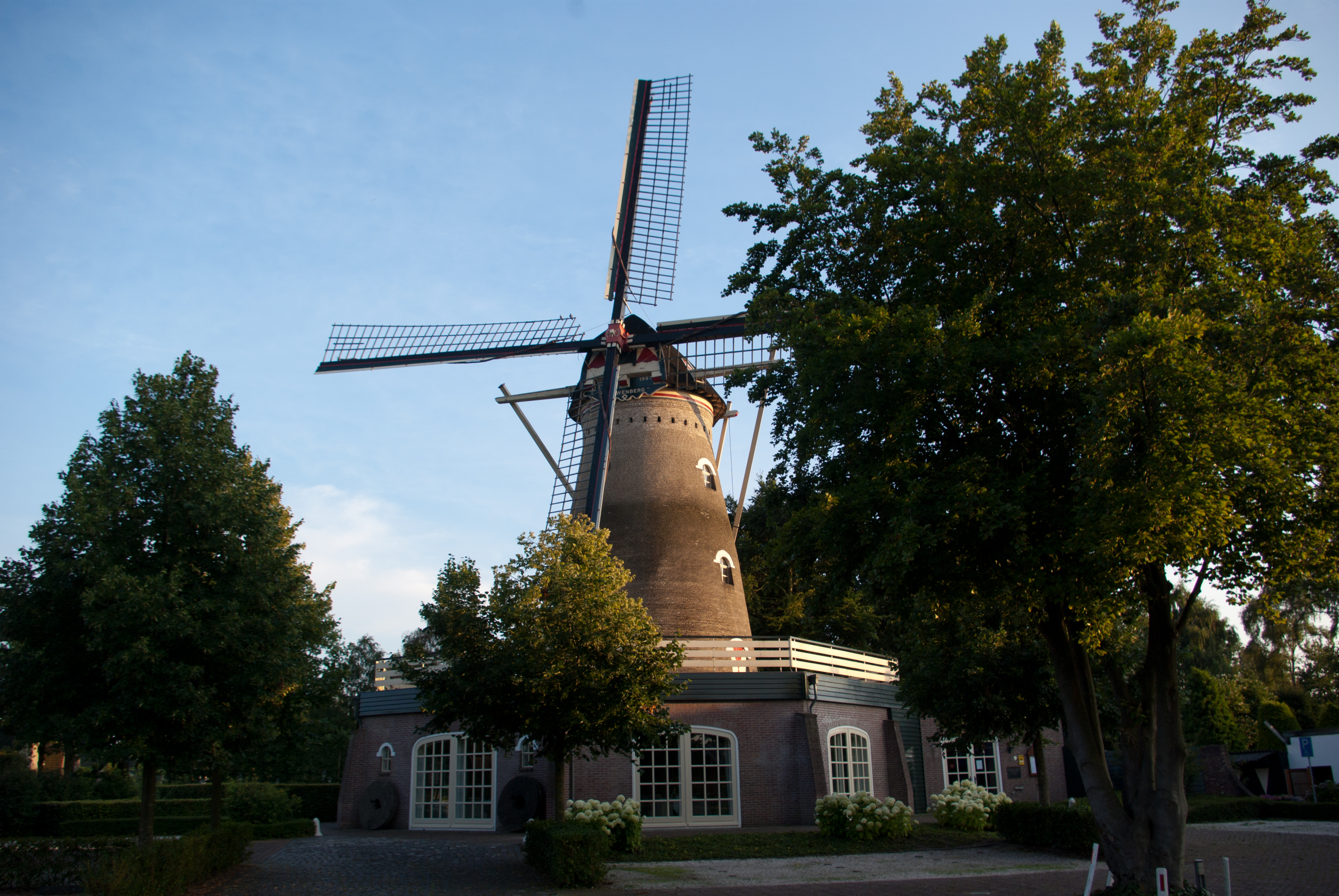
Windmill The Couwenbergh

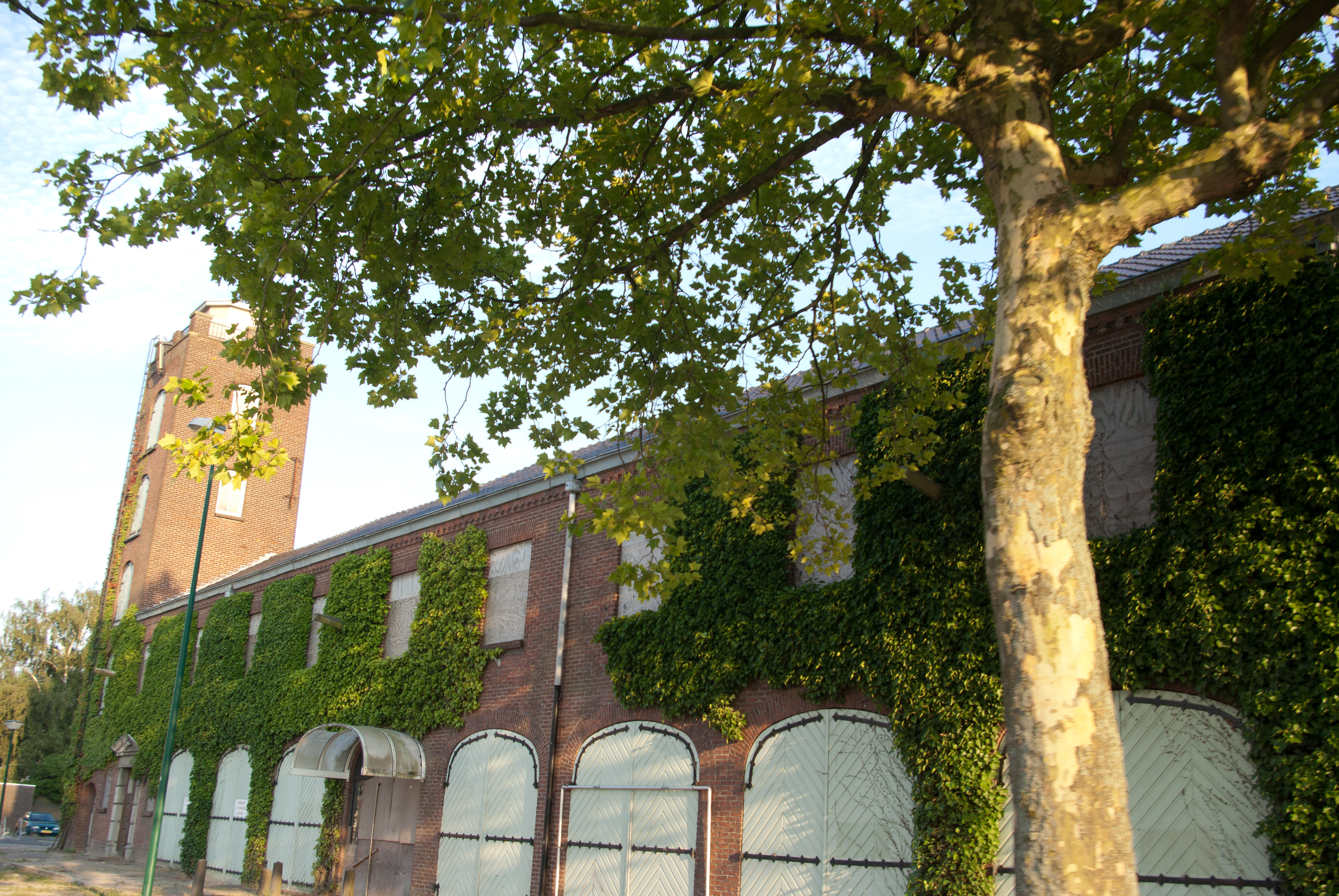
The Old Firestation

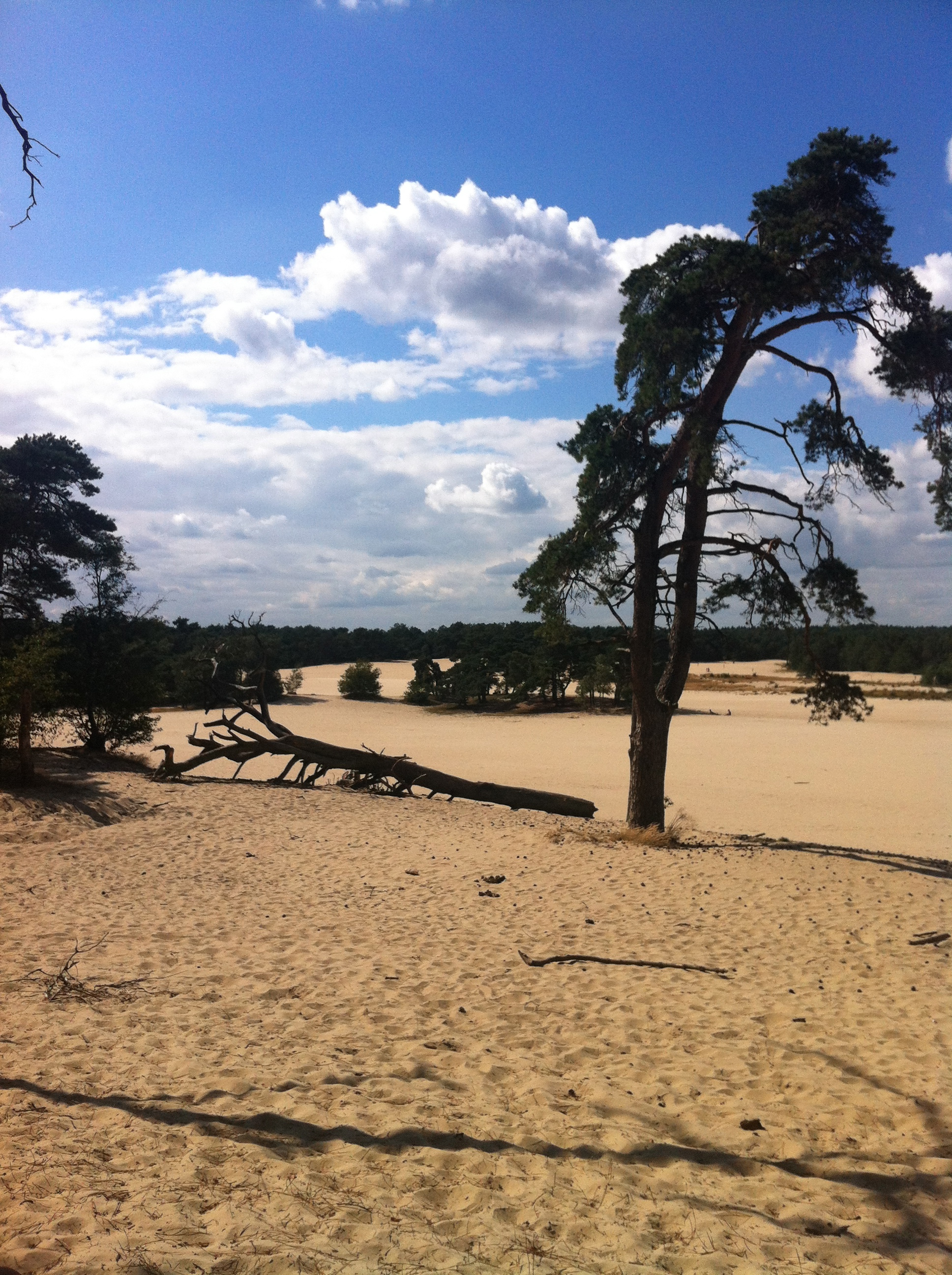
National Park Loonse en Drunense Duinen

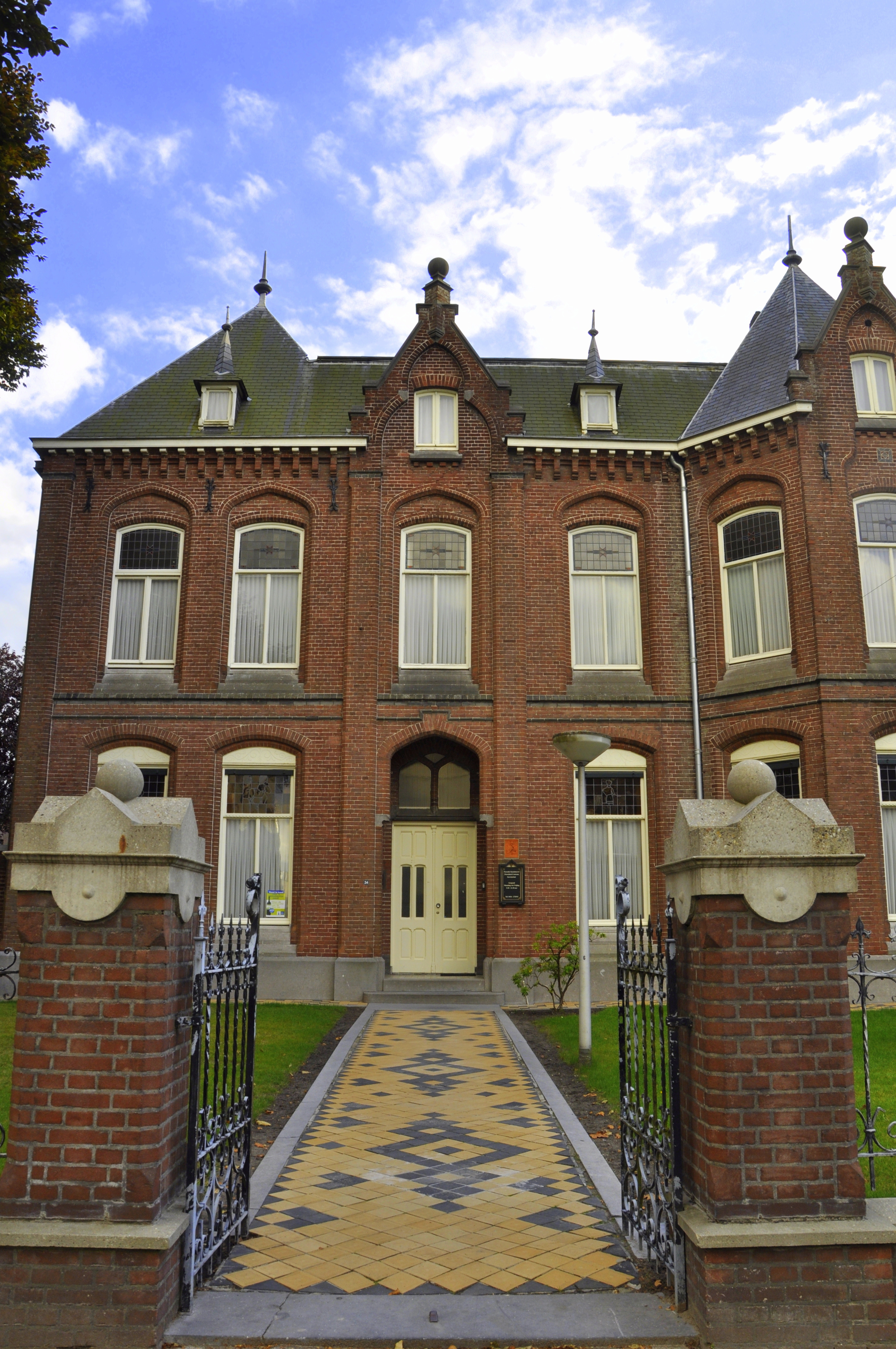
House in the centre

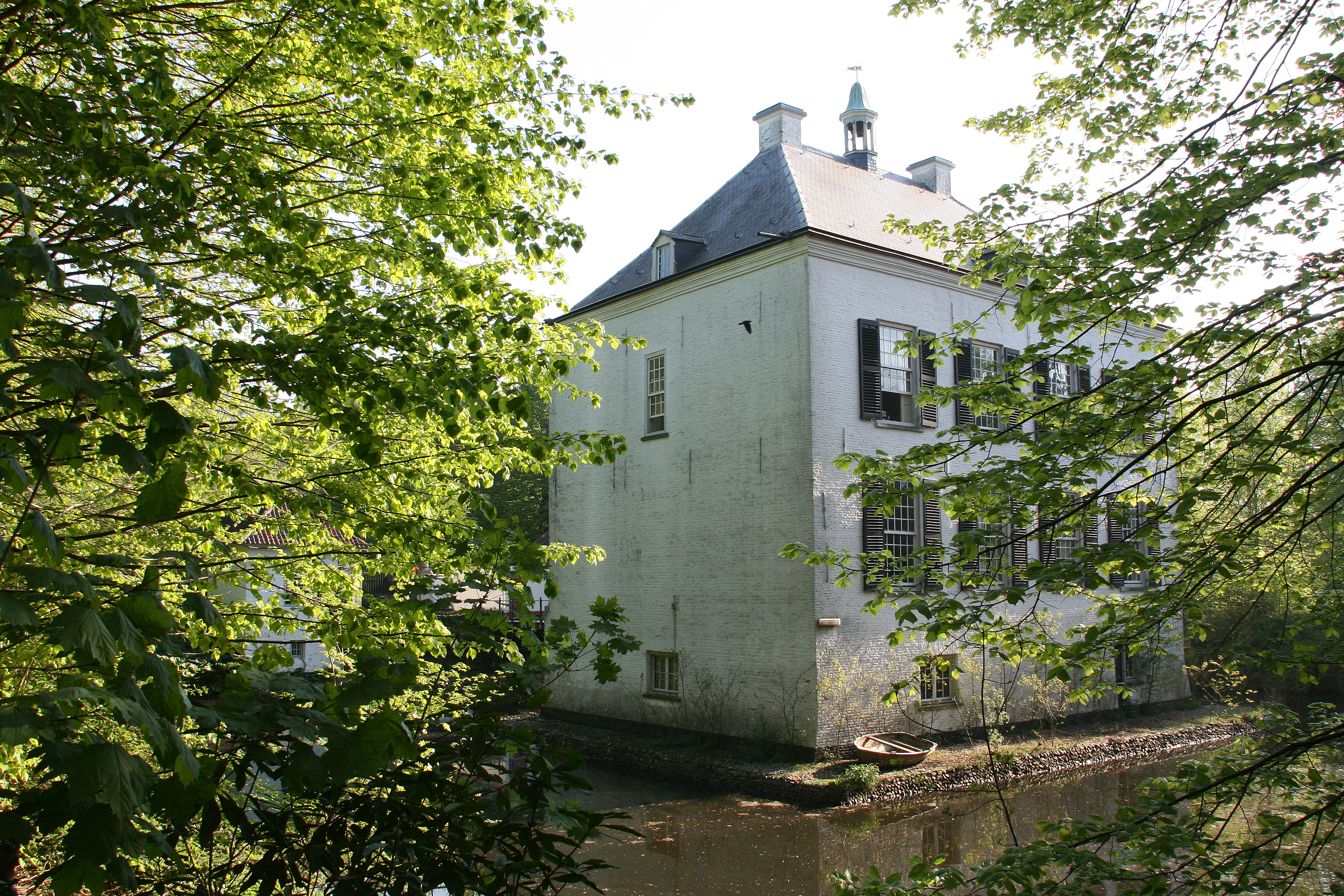
Castle of Lord of Venloon, nearby Kaatsheuvel

In the 15th century, most of the peat land was silted up. This ensured that the income from peat extraction was considerably reduced. Many Kaatsheuvel citizens therefore took the initiative to secure their first life needs. They already owned a nice piece of land, so with a small amount of cattle they could provide for their own necessities. Agriculture was fairly primitive, which meant that the agricultural land was used only once. The woody area was also very suitable as a hunting ground, which made hunting a source of income.

=== 17th and 18th century: Shelter churches and robber gangs ===
The 80-year war came to an end on 15 May 1648 with the Peace of Munster. The peace between Spain and the Republic of the United Provinces led to a division of Brabant. The south of the duchy belonged to the Spanish Netherlands, while the north, Staats-Brabant, became part of the Republic of the United Netherlands.

State Brabant was a so-called "Generality Country", unlike other areas, State Brabant was not recognized as an equivalent province of the Republic and therefore did not get its own government.

During this period, the whole of Brabant was systematically stripped of money by the Republic, so that there was hardly any economic development. The Republic wanted to turn Brabant into a Protestant province before it was recognized for the time being. The people from Brabant, however, saw all the merits go to Holland, so that they had little sympathy for the States General. The population secretly continued to practice the Catholic faith by converting barns into hiding churches. The Kaatsheuvel community had no church of its own at the time and had to go to the shelter church in the White Castle in Loon op Zand.

Kaatsheuvel was located in the border region of Holland and Staats-Brabant. Around 1720, this brought a fairly large gang of pagans to this area, which in part consisted of marshes and forests.

From the Ravenbosch near Kaatsheuvel, the robber gang "de Witte Veer" operated. This gang regularly undertook raids far into the republic of Holland. The robbers took advantage of the disagreements between State Brabant and Holland. If they had planned a robbery in Holland, they would not cooperate in Brabant, and vice versa. The deputy governor of Loon op Zand, Otto Juijn, was a sustainer and in 1725 he succeeded in capturing the leader of the gang called Black John.

In 1795, the Republic of the Seven United Netherlands was overthrown and the Batavian Republic, a French sister republic, recognized the Catholics as equal citizens. The State Brabant became a province in 1795, with the name Batavian Brabant

=== 19th century: Leather and shoe industry ===
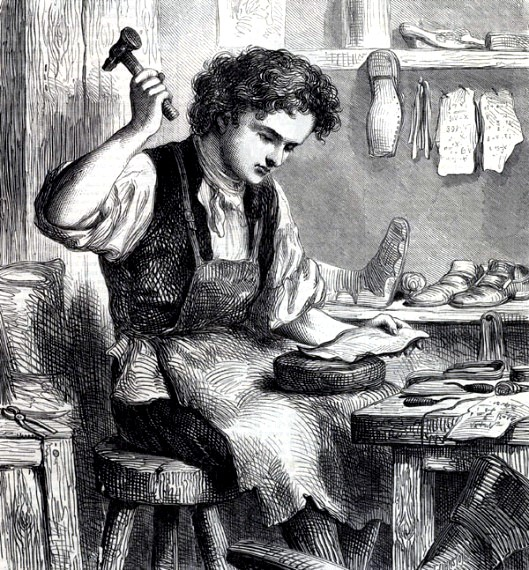
Apprentice shoemaker

The Batavian Republic was abolished and the Kingdom of Holland was founded in 1806. The provinces of North Brabant, Antwerp and South Brabant were added to the kingdom, although this was for a short period. The economy in North Brabant had grown enormously in the short time. With the addition of Antwerp and South Brabant, North Brabant had become at the center of the kingdom.

The Belgian uprising, however, again caused a division of Brabant. Antwerp and South Brabant became part of the independent country "Belgium". The province of North Brabant, which had never really taken sides, eventually remained part of the Netherlands. In the Brabant region, De Langstraat, especially in Kaatsheuvel and Waalwijk, a smooth-running leather and shoe industry developed. Many citizens work in factories or were independent dealers in leather goods and shoes.

=== 20th century: Tourism and kitchens ===
By pastor F.J. the Klijn and the curate E. Rietra, plans are made for a recreational field in Kaatsheuvel. In the spring of 1935, the Roman Catholic Sports and Hiking Park is opened. This recreational field developed after the Second World War (1952) into a theme park Efteling. The theme park provided local employment and recreation.

Eventually, Efteling has become one of the largest and most successful theme parks in the world. The park has won many prizes over the years, including "best amusement park in Europe" in 1972 and "best theme park in the world" in 1992. The Efteling gained worldwide fame through the Sprookjesbos, which was largely designed by the famous Dutch artist Anton Pieck and tech person Peter Reijnders. The first madhouse in the world "Villa Volta", water show "Aquanura" and darkride "Symbolica, Paleis der Fantasie" have won international THEA Awards.

With 5.3 million visitors on an annual basis, Efteling is the most visited attraction park in the Netherlands. Ben Mandemakers started selling kitchens in Kaatsheuvel in 1978. In the meantime, Mandemakers Groep has become the largest empire for kitchens in the Netherlands with more than 17 store formulas. Various showrooms are located in Kaatsheuvel itself.

== Etymology ==
Kaatsheuvel is a combination of the words Kaats and Heuvel, Heuvel being the Dutch word for "hill". The etymology of Kaats is less clear. One theory regarding the origin of the name is that it originates from St. Catharina, a popular saint at the time. Another theory holds that the early inhabitants of Kaatsheuvel were well known for playing a game called kaatsspel on a hill nearby. However, the most likely explanation is that a man named Hendrik Cets lived in the 17th century on a hill where Kaatsheuvel now stands, and over time this place came to be known as Cetsheuvel, and eventually Kaatsheuvel.

== Art and Culture ==
- The village of Kaatsheuvel is located in the area 'De Langstraat' which is traditionally known for its shoe industry. The Shoe and Leather Museum in the nearby city of Waalwijk shows the history of the region.
- The village also has several stages where music and theater performances are played.

Crossroads (youth center), Gildebont (social cultural center), Theater Klavier and the Efteling Theater.

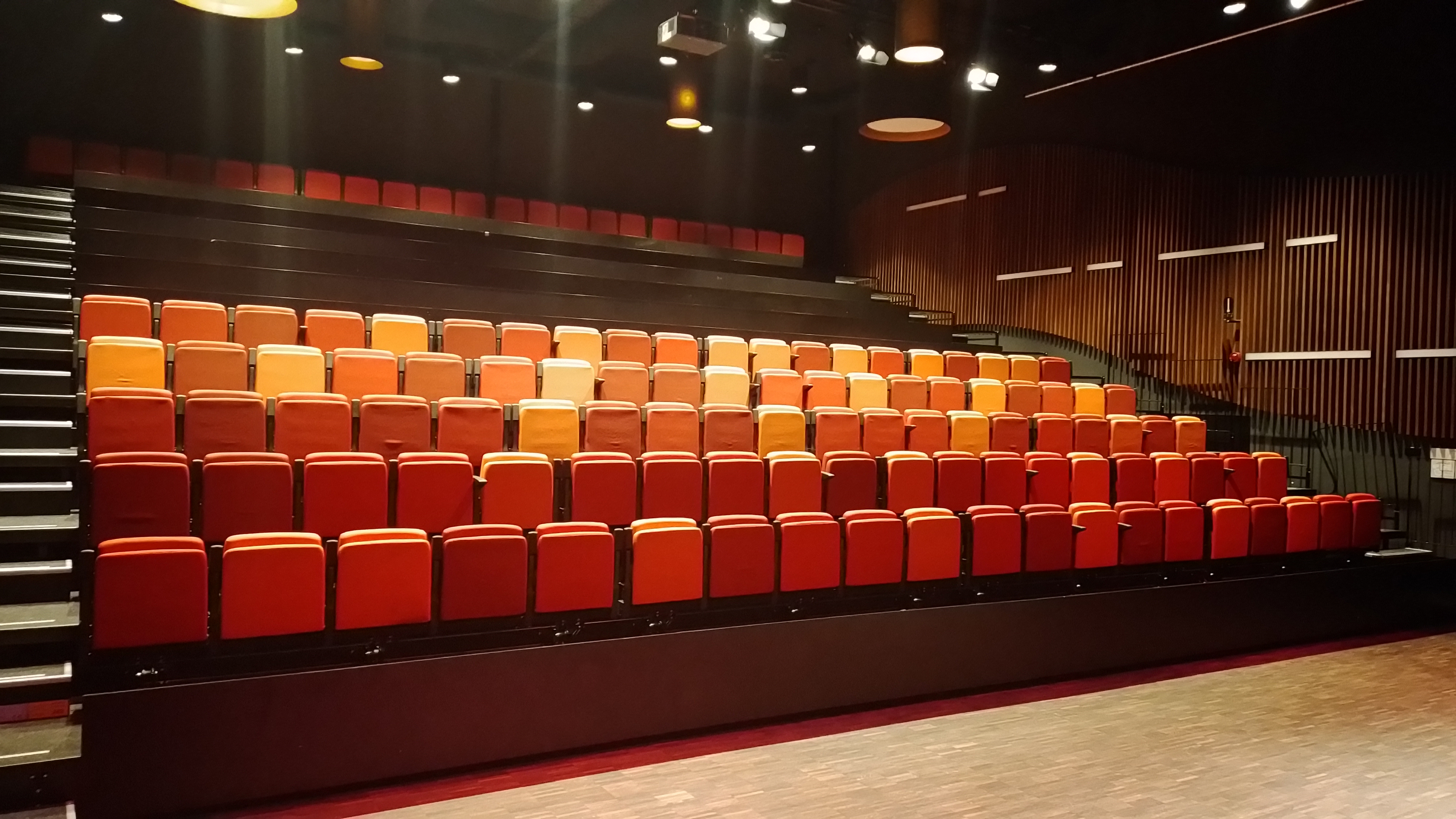
Theater 't Klavier

- Every year several music and cultural festivals are organized, including the Dance Fairytale Festival, Anton Pieck Food Truck Festival and Square Festival in the summer season and The illuminated Sinterklaas entry and Carnival procession in the winter season.

== Delicacies ==
Although the Netherlands is a small country, it has various regions with their own culture and delicacies. Overproduction of regional foods was often used for these delicacies. There was a lot of fishing along the coast, which meant that fish dishes appeared on a regular basis. In the province of North Brabant, in particular in the Langstraat region, was a thriving leather industry. This meant that many farmers were needed. The leather was used for shoes, but the meat was used in various dishes.

The Brabantian worstenbroodje is an example of a typical regional product that originated from cattle farming in North Brabant.

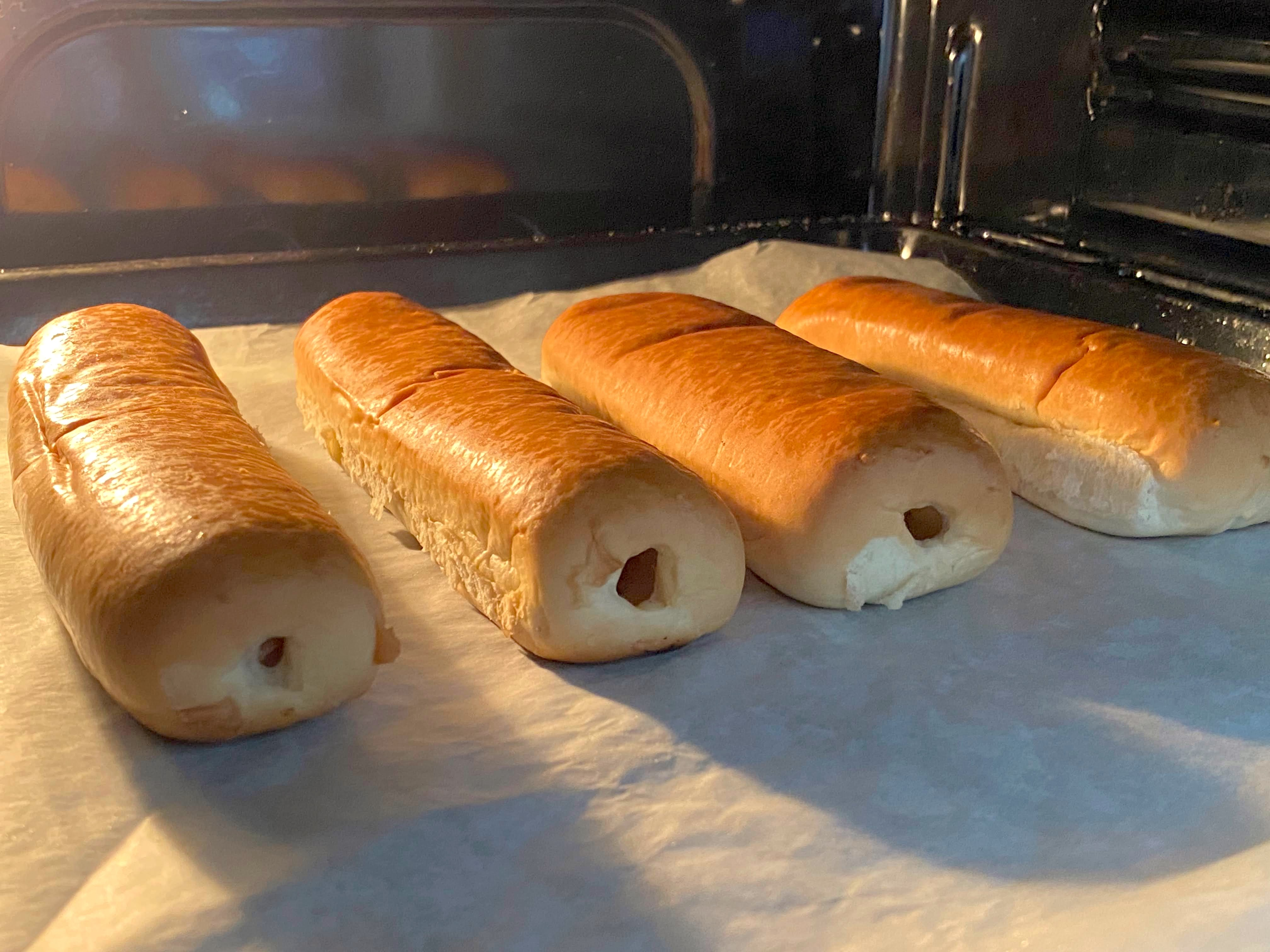
Brabantian Worstenbrood

The puff pastry from the traditional English sausage roll was too expensive for the inhabitants of the region. That was why bread dough was used as an alternative. The bread dough also had the advantage that the minced meat was kept longer fresh.

A typical Kaatsheuvel dish is the Mikkemannen. They are dolls made from bread dough, in which gingerbread spices and cinnamon are processed.

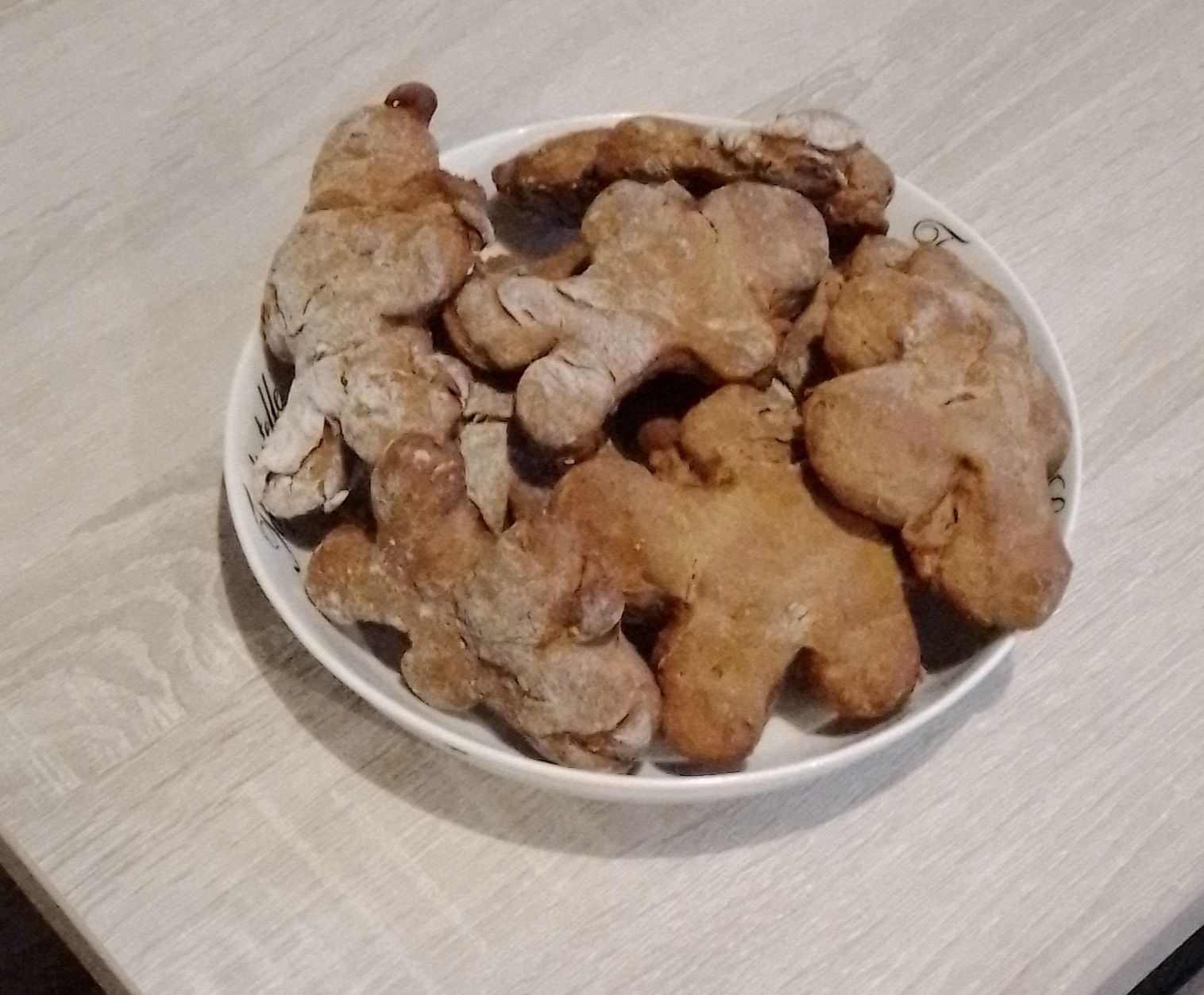
Mikkemannen (breadmen) from Kaatsheuvel

The Mikkemannen are often eaten with butter and sugar. Speculaas was not affordable in the south, making Mikkemannen a cheaper alternative.

== Location ==
Kaatsheuvel is situated near the municipalities of Waalwijk, Heusden and Dongen, in the middle of North Brabant. It is also close to several bigger cities like Tilburg, known for its textile, Herbal liqueur 'Schrobbeler' and the Big Summer Funfair. 's-Hertogenbosch, the capital of North Brabant is known for its Art- and Designmuseums, Canals and historical center. and last of all Breda, Nassau-City, known for its historical center and historical links with the Dutch royal family.

== People born in Kaatsheuvel ==
- Ben Mandemakers
- Marius van Amelsvoort (1930–2006), politician
- Jacqueline Govaert (born 1982), musician
