= Saskia Stuiveling =

Dutch politician and president of the Netherlands Court of Audit (1945–2017)

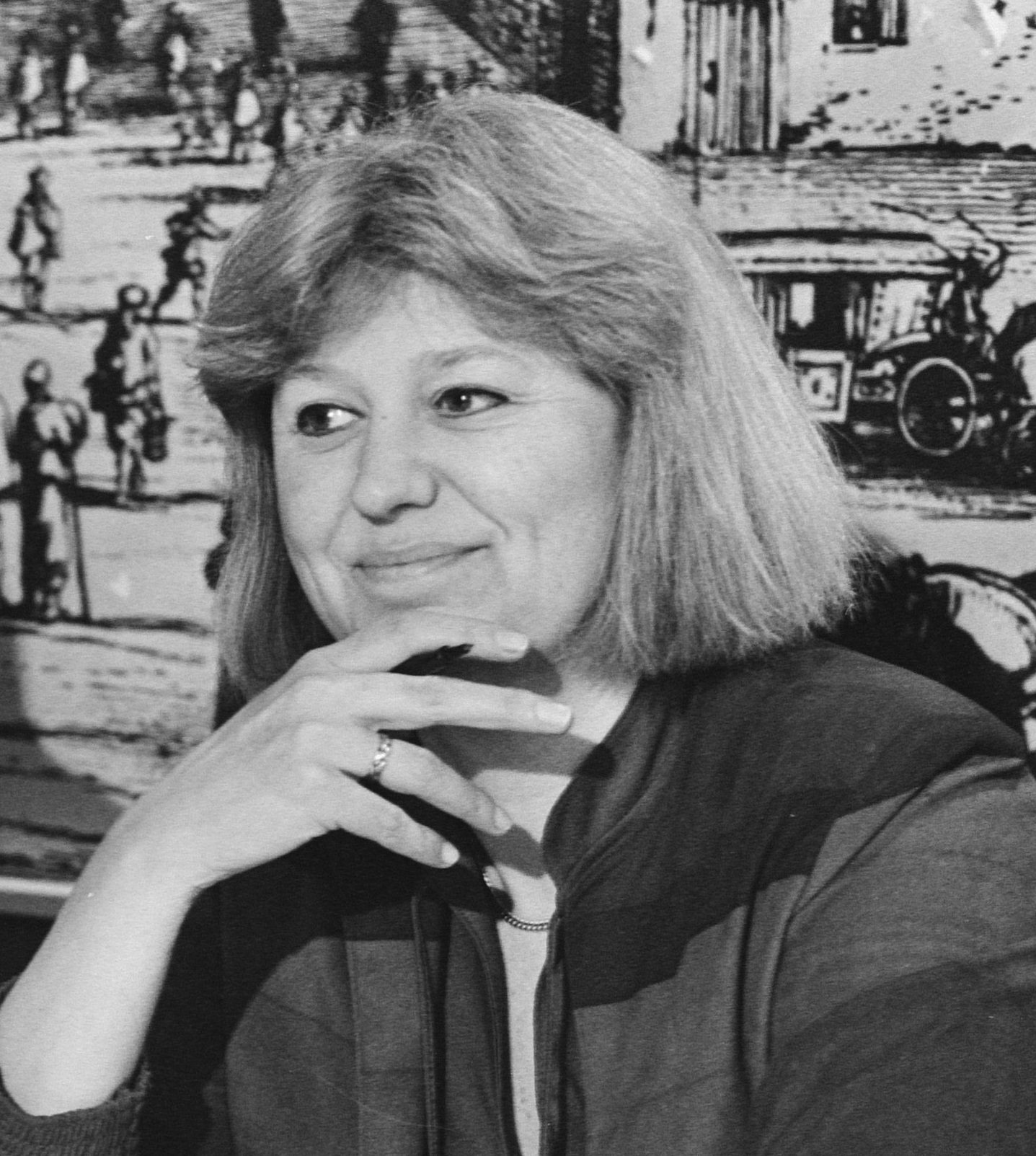
- Stuiveling in 1985

President of the Court of Audit
- In office 1 May 1999 – 31 May 2015
- Preceded by: Henk Koning
- Succeeded by: Arno Visser

State Secretary for the Interior
- In office 11 September 1981 – 29 May 1982
- Prime Minister: Dries van Agt
- Minister: Ed van Thijn
- Preceded by: Henk Koning
- Succeeded by: Gerard van Leijenhorst

Member of the Senate
- In office 10 June 1981 – 10 September 1981

Personal details
- Born: Saskia Jenne Stuiveling; 3 May 1945 Hilversum, Netherlands
- Died: 20 April 2017 (aged 71) Rotterdam, Netherlands
- Party: Labour Party (PvdA)
- Spouse: Jan Hendrik Scheewe
- Children: 2 (adopted)
- Education: Erasmus University Rotterdam
- Occupation: Politician · Civil servant · Economist

Saskia Jenne Stuiveling (3 May 1945 – 20 April 2017) was a Dutch politician and public administrator who served as president of the Netherlands Court of Audit (Algemene Rekenkamer) from 1999 to 2015. She was the first woman to hold this position and played a significant role in modernising public accountability and financial oversight in the Netherlands.

== Early life ==
Stuiveling was born in Hilversum as the youngest of four children. Her father, Garmt Stuiveling, was a poet and professor of Dutch literature at the University of Amsterdam, and her mother, Mathilde van Vierssen Trip, was a writer.

She completed her secondary education at the Gemeentelijk Gymnasium in Hilversum and began studying law in 1964 at the Netherlands School of Economics in Rotterdam. During her studies, which she did not complete, she helped establish the first Dutch programme in business administration. After obtaining a master's degree in business administration in 1972, Stuiveling founded a management consulting firm.

== Political career ==
Through work for the Labour Party (PvdA), Stuiveling became a policy adviser to André van der Louw when he became mayor of Rotterdam in 1975. After a brief period as a member of the Senate for the PvdA, she was appointed State Secretary for the Interior in 1981 in the second Van Agt cabinet. During that period Stuiveling developed a deep distrust of politics.

Following the cabinet's collapse, she served as research coordinator of the parliamentary inquiry into the Rijn-Schelde-Verolme shipbuilding group, an influential investigation into government support for industry excesses.

== Court of Audit ==
Stuiveling became a member of the Court of Audit in 1984. In 1999 she was appointed president, becoming the first woman to lead this High Council of State. During her sixteen-year presidency, the Court underwent significant institutional development. Stuiveling argued that traditional centres of power in The Hague needed to be modernised and digitized. Also, public accountability required greater transparency and accessibility of government data. Under her leadership, the Court expanded its scope and visibility, strengthened its relationship with the House of Representatives, and placed greater emphasis on evaluating policy outcomes alongside financial legality. She stated that by the end of her tenure more than 99 per cent of national government expenditure could be assessed as lawful which was a significant improvement.

Stuiveling was also active internationally, promoting cooperation among supreme audit institutions and encouraging innovation within the profession. At her initiative, the Court of Audit raised concerns about a lack of transparency in NATO accounting, where billions of euros were insufficiently accounted for.

Upon her retirement in 2015, Prime Minister Mark Rutte announced the creation of the Stuiveling Open Data Award (SODA), an annual prize for public initiatives that promote the use of open government data.

== Later life and death ==
Stuiveling was married to paediatrician Jan Hendrik Scheewe, with whom she adopted a daughter and a son. She died unexpectedly in Rotterdam on 20 April 2017, shortly before her 72nd birthday. At her funeral, Mark Rutte praised her as "the The Hague prophet of digitalization".

== Decorations and awards (selection) ==
Honours
Ribbon bar	Honour	Country	Date	Comment
	Knight of the Order of the Netherlands Lion	Netherlands	1991	
	Knight of the Order of Merit	Chile	1991	
	Grand Officer of the Order of Leopold II	Belgium	2001	
	Commander of the Order of Orange-Nassau	Netherlands	2009	

Political offices
Preceded by Henk Koning	State Secretary for the Interior; 1981–1982	Succeeded by Gerard van Leijenhorst
Civic offices
Preceded by Henk Koning	President of the Court of Audit; 1999–2015	Succeeded by Arno Visser
