= Willem Vermeend =

Dutch politician (born 1948)

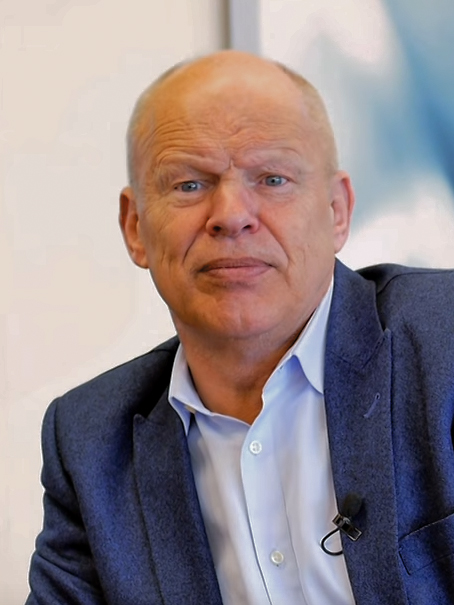
- Willem Vermeend in 2016

Member of the Social and Economic Council
- In office 15 January 2004 – 1 September 2010
- Chairman: Herman Wijffels (2004–2006); Alexander Rinnooy Kan (2006–2010)

Minister of Social Affairs and Employment
- In office 24 March 2000 – 22 July 2002
- Prime Minister: Wim Kok
- Preceded by: Klaas de Vries
- Succeeded by: Aart Jan de Geus

State Secretary for Finance
- In office 22 August 1994 – 24 March 2000
- Prime Minister: Wim Kok
- Preceded by: Marius van Amelsvoort
- Succeeded by: Wouter Bos

Member of the House of Representatives
- In office 23 May 2002 – 26 July 2002
- In office 19 May 1998 – 3 August 1998
- In office 19 June 1984 – 22 August 1994
- Parliamentary group: Labour Party

Personal details
- Born: Wilhelmus Adrianus Franciscus Gabriël Vermeend; 21 December 1948 (age 77) Zuilen, Netherlands
- Party: Labour Party (from 1972)
- Education: University of Groningen (Bachelor of Laws, Master of Laws); Leiden University (Doctor of Law)
- Occupation: Politician · Jurist · Economist · Researcher · Businessman · Corporate director · Nonprofit director · Trade association executive · Political pundit · Columnist · Author · Professor

Wilhelmus Adrianus Franciscus Gabriël "Willem" Vermeend (born 21 December 1948) is a retired Dutch politician of the Labour Party (PvdA), academic, author and businessman. His academic career has varied between specialising in tax law, European law, and digital economy. As an author, he has published over a dozen books. Subjects include politics and economics.

== Education and academic career ==
Vermeend attended a Gymnasium in Groningen from March 1961 until April 1972 and applied at the University of Groningen in May 1972 majoring in Tax law and obtaining a Bachelor of Laws degree in June 1972 before graduating with a Master of Laws degree in July 1975. Vermeend worked as a researcher at the Leiden University from July 1975 until April 1977 and as an associate professor of Tax law at the Leiden University from April 1977 until June 1984 and got a doctorate as a Doctor of Law in March 1983. Vermeend also returned as a visiting professor of Tax law at the University of Groningen from 1 January 1991 until 22 August 1994 and as a visiting professor of European Tax law at the University of Limburg from 1 April 1991 until 1 August 1993.

After retiring from politics, Vermeend also served as a distinguished professor of Tax law at the Leiden University from 1 August 2002 until 1 May 2004 and a distinguished professor of European law at the Maastricht University from 1 May 2004 until 1 September 2010 and a distinguished professor of Tax law at the Maastricht University from 1 January 2006 until 1 September 2010 and Vermeend has been a distinguished professor of Digital economy at the Open University in Heerlen since 1 January 2014.

== Political career ==
Vermeend became a Member of the House of Representatives after Schelto Patijn was appointed as Queen's Commissioner of South Holland, taking office on 19 June 1984 serving as a frontbencher and spokesperson for Social security and Kingdom Relations. After the election of 1994 Vermeend was appointed as State Secretary for Finance in the Cabinet Kok I, taking office on 22 August 1994. After the election of 1998 Vermeend returned as a Member of the House of Representatives, taking office on 19 May 1998. Following the cabinet formation 1998 Vermeend continued as State Secretary for Finance in the Cabinet Kok II, taking office on 3 August 1998. Vermeend was appointed as Minister of Social Affairs and Employment following the appointed of Klaas de Vries as Minister of the Interior and Kingdom Relations, taking office on 24 March 2000. The Cabinet Kok II resigned on 16 April 2002 following the conclusions of the NIOD report into the Srebrenica massacre during the Bosnian War and continued to serve in a demissionary capacity. After the election of 2002 Vermeend again returned as a Member of the House of Representatives, taking office on 23 May 2002. The Cabinet Kok II was replaced by the Cabinet Balkenende I following the cabinet formation of 2002 on 22 July 2002 and he continued to serve in the House of Representatives until his resignation on 26 July 2002.

== Retirement from politics, private sector work ==
Vermeend retired from national politics and became active in the private sector and public sector and occupied numerous seats as a corporate director and nonprofit director on several boards of directors and supervisory boards (Mitsubishi Motors Europe, Randstad NV, AFAB Company, Royal Imtech N.V., Rotra Company, Free Record Shop, DSM Company, Maison van den Boer, Meeùs Group, Society for Statistics and Operations Research, SEO Economic Research and the Energy Research Centre) and served on several state commissions and councils on behalf of the government (Bureau for Economic Policy Analysis and the Social and Economic Council). Vermeend also worked as a trade association executive for the Industry and Employers confederation serving as Vice Chairman of the Executive Board from January 2004 until September 2010.

== Publications ==
Vermeend is also a prolific author, having written more than a dozen books since 2002 about business, economics, finance, politics, tax law and computer security.

== Decorations ==
Honours
Ribbon bar	Honour	Country	Date	Comment
	Officer of the Order of Oranje-Nassau	Netherlands	10 December 2002	

Political offices
Preceded by Marius van Amelsvoort	State Secretary for Finance; 1994–2000	Succeeded by Wouter Bos
Preceded by Klaas de Vries	Minister of Social Affairs and Employment; 2000–2002	Succeeded by Aart Jan de Geus
