= Gerard van Leijenhorst =

Dutch politician and chemist

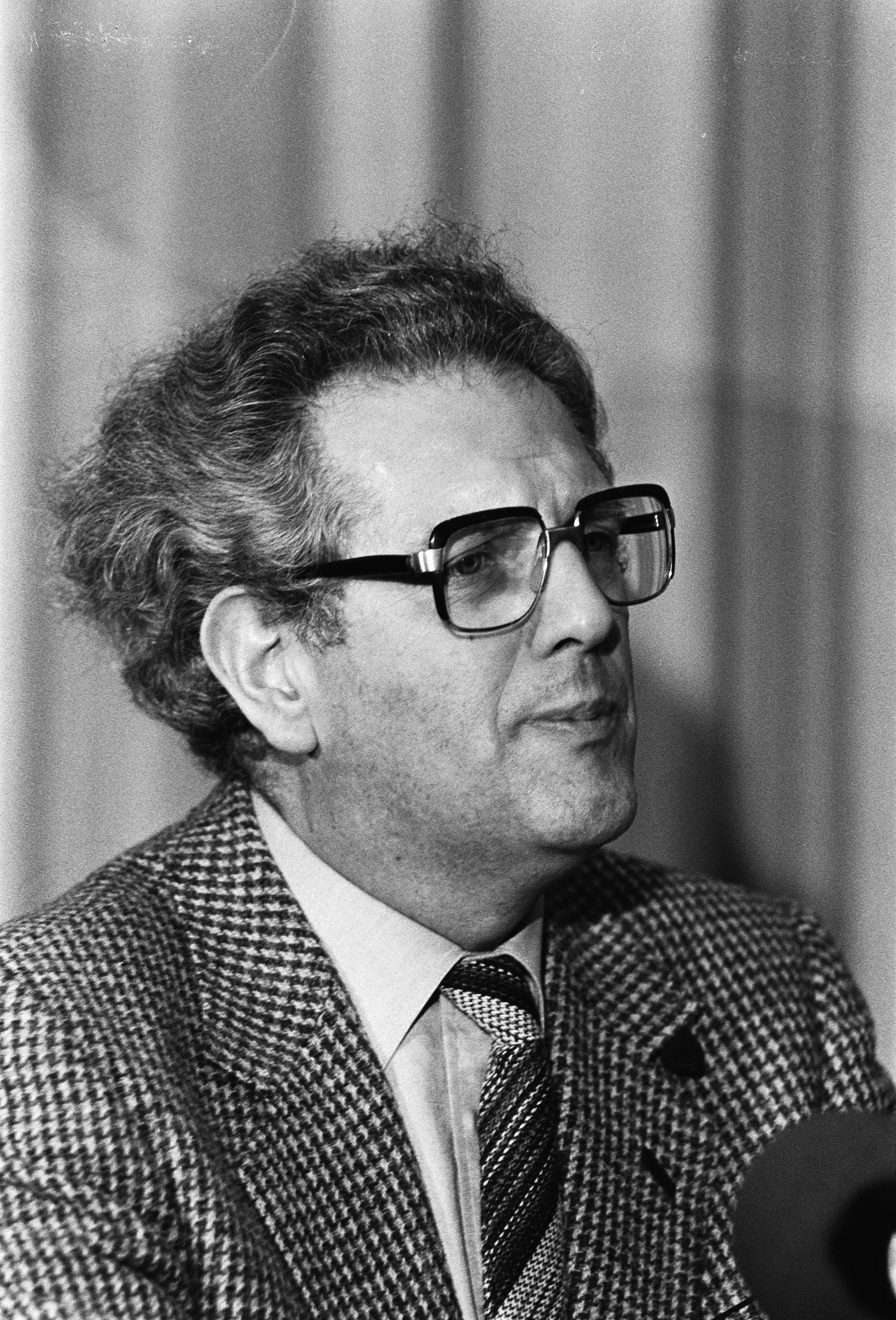
- Gerard van Leijenhorst in 1979

State Secretary for Education and Sciences
- In office 8 November 1982 – 14 July 1986 Serving with Nell Ginjaar-Maas
- Prime Minister: Ruud Lubbers
- Preceded by: Ad Hermes
- Succeeded by: Nell Ginjaar-Maas

State Secretary for the Interior
- In office 11 September 1981 – 4 November 1982 Serving with Saskia Stuiveling
- Prime Minister: Dries van Agt
- Preceded by: Henk Koning
- Succeeded by: Marius van Amelsvoort

Member of the House of Representatives
- In office 3 June 1986 – 17 May 1994
- In office 16 September 1982 – 8 November 1982
- In office 3 August 1971 – 11 September 1981
- Parliamentary group: Christian Democratic Appeal (1980–1994); Christian Historical Union (1971–1980)

Personal details
- Born: Gerard van Leijenhorst; 11 June 1928 Ede, Netherlands
- Died: 28 December 2001 (aged 73) Garderen, Netherlands
- Party: Christian Democratic Appeal (from 1980)
- Other political affiliations: Christian Historical Union (until 1980)
- Spouse: Geertruida Hendrika Swets (m. 1956)
- Children: 4 children
- Education: Utrecht University (Bachelor of Science, Master of Science)
- Occupation: Politician · Chemist · Researcher · Teacher · Nonprofit director · Education administrator · Lobbyist · Activist

Gerard van Leijenhorst (11 June 1928 – 28 December 2001) was a Dutch politician and chemist. He was a member of the defunct Christian Historical Union (CHU) party and later of the Christian Democratic Appeal (CDA) party.

== Education and early career ==
Van Leijenhorst attended a Gymnasium in Amersfoort from May 1940 until June 1946, and applied at the Utrecht University in July 1948 majoring in Physics and Chemistry obtaining a Bachelor of Science degree in June 1950 and worked as a student researcher before graduating with a Master of Science degree in Chemistry in July 1954. Van Leijenhorst worked as a chemistry teacher in Almelo from July 1954 until August 1955 and in Gouda from August 1955 until August 1971. Van Leijenhorst also worked as an education administrator for several Protestant educational organisations from March 1966 until August 1971. Van Leijenhorst served on the Municipal Council of Gouda from 1 September 1970 until 1 September 1971.

== Election to the House of Representatives ==
Van Leijenhorst became a Member of the House of Representatives after Willem Scholten was appointed as State Secretary for Finance in the Cabinet Biesheuvel I after the election of 1971, taking office on 3 August 1971 serving as a frontbencher chairing the special parliamentary committee for Cultural Minorities and spokesperson for Education, Social Work, Culture and deputy spokesperson for Media and Kingdom Relations. After the election of 1981 Van Leijenhorst was appointed as State Secretary for the Interior in the Cabinet Van Agt II, taking office on 11 September 1981. The Cabinet Van Agt II fell just seven months into its term on 12 May 1982 after months of tensions in the coalition and continued to serve in a demissionary capacity until the first cabinet formation of 1982 when it was replaced by the caretaker Cabinet Van Agt III with Van Leijenhorst continuing as State Secretary for the Interior, taking office on 29 May 1982. After the election of 1982 Van Leijenhorst returned as a Member of the House of Representatives, taking office on 16 September 1982. Following the second cabinet formation of 1982 Van Leijenhorst was appointed as State Secretary for Education and Sciences in the Cabinet Lubbers I, taking office on 8 November 1982. After the election of 1986 Van Leijenhorst again returned as a Member of the House of Representatives, taking office on 3 June 1986. Following the cabinet formation of 1986 Van Leijenhorst was not given a cabinet post in the new cabinet, the Cabinet Lubbers I was replaced by the Cabinet Lubbers II on 14 July 1986 and he continued to serve in the House of Representatives as a frontbencher chairing the parliamentary committee for Education and Sciences and spokesperson for Education, Science, Culture and deputy spokesperson for Social Work and Media. In October 1993 Van Leijenhorst announced that he wouldn't stand for the election of 1994 and he continued to serve until the end of the parliamentary term on 17 May 1994.

Van Leijenhorst was known for his abilities as a manager and policy wonk. Van Leijenhorst continued to comment on political affairs until his retirement in 1998, he died 3 years later at the age of 73.

== Decorations ==
Honours
| Ribbon bar | Honour | Country | Date | Comment |
|---|---|---|---|---|
| | Grand Officer of the Order of Orange-Nassau | Netherlands | 26 August 1986 | |
| | Knight of the Order of the Netherlands Lion | Netherlands | 30 April 1989 | |

Political offices
| Preceded by Henk Koning | State Secretary for the Interior; 1981–1982; Served alongside: Saskia Stuiveling | Succeeded by Marius van Amelsvoort |
| Preceded by Ad Hermes | State Secretary for Education and Sciences; 1982–1986; With: Nell Ginjaar-Maas | Succeeded by Nell Ginjaar-Maas |
