= Nell Ginjaar-Maas =

Dutch politician (1931–2012)

Her Excellency Nell Ginjaar-Maas
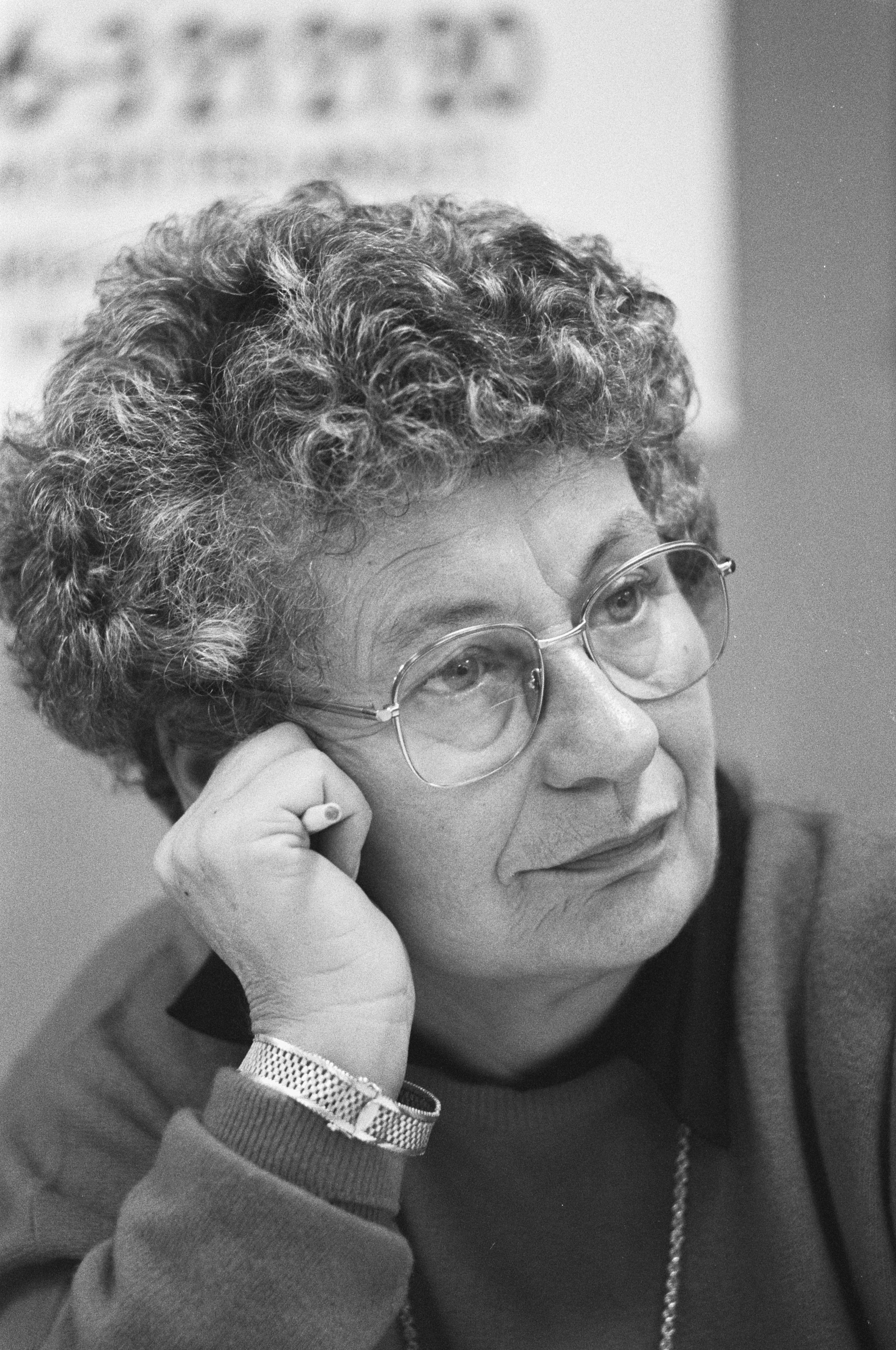
- Nell Ginjaar-Maas in 1977

State Secretary of Education and Sciences
- In office 5 November 1982 – 7 November 1989 Serving with Gerard van Leijenhorst (1982–1986)
- Prime Minister: Ruud Lubbers
- Preceded by: Ad Hermes
- Succeeded by: Jacques Wallage

Member of the House of Representatives
- In office 14 September 1989 – 25 September 1993
- In office 3 June 1986 – 14 July 1986
- In office 4 September 1973 – 5 November 1982

Personal details
- Born: Nelly Jeanne Maas; 7 May 1931 Rotterdam, Netherlands
- Died: 24 April 2012 (aged 80) Corsica, France
- Party: People's Party for Freedom and Democracy (from 1960)
- Spouse: Leendert Ginjaar (m. 1954; died 2003)
- Children: 2 daughters and 1 son
- Education: Leiden University
- Occupation: Politician · Teacher

Nelly Jeanne "Nell" Ginjaar-Maas (7 May 1931 – 24 April 2012) was a Dutch politician of the People's Party for Freedom and Democracy (VVD) and teacher.

Ginjaar-Maas was born in Rotterdam, and was a member of the House of Representatives for the People's Party for Freedom and Democracy for nine years. Ginjaar-Maas was married to minister Leendert Ginjaar. Ginjaar-Maas died on the island of Corsica on 24 April 2012.

== Decorations ==
Honours
Ribbon bar	Honour	Country	Date	Comment
	Commander of the Order of Orange-Nassau	Netherlands	20 November 1989	

Political offices
Preceded by Ad Hermes	State Secretary of Education and Sciences; 1982–1989; Served alongside: Gerard van Leijenhorst (1982–1986)	Succeeded by Jacques Wallage
