= Brabantian worstenbroodje =

Dutch pastry snack

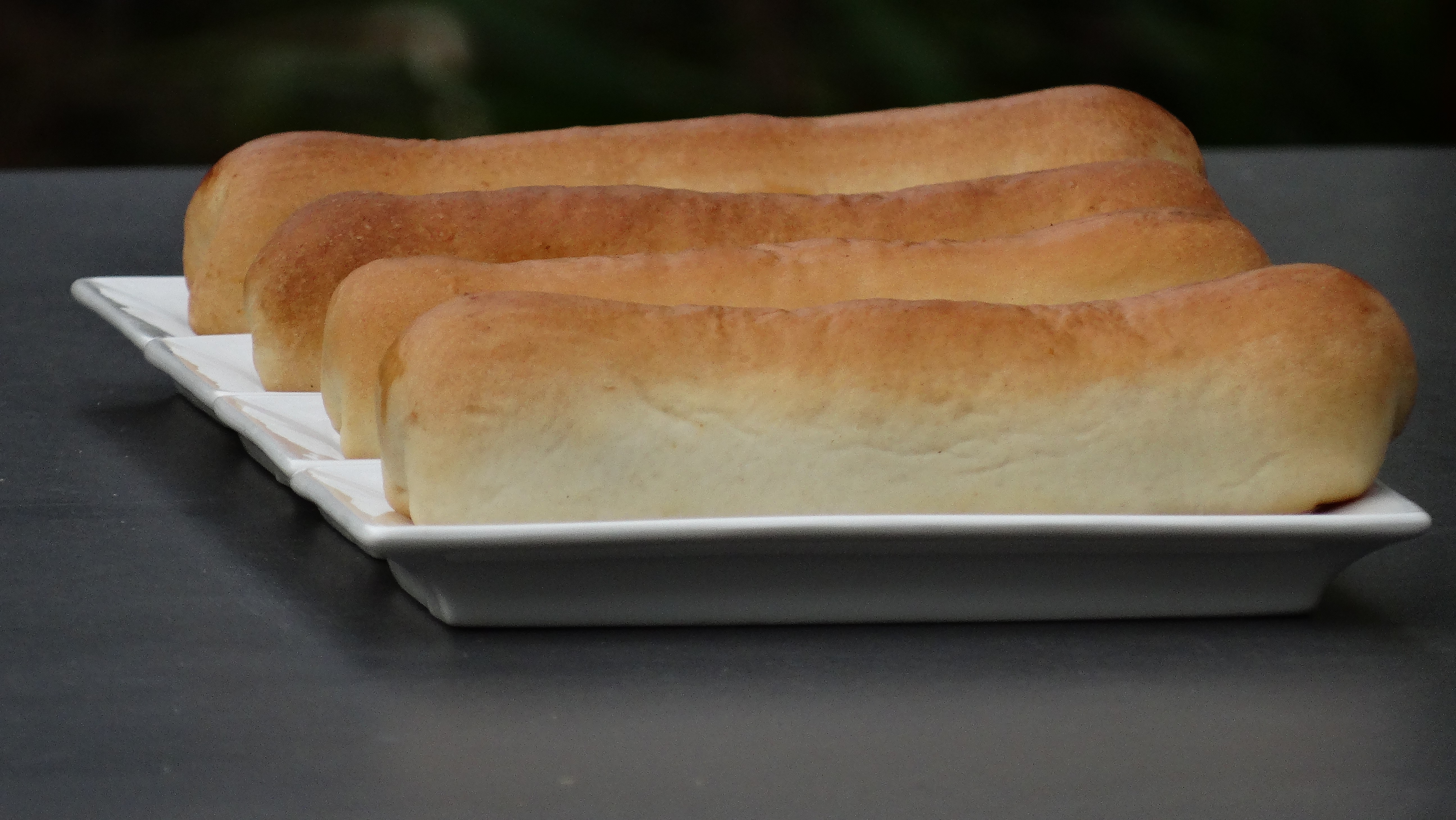
Brabantian worstenbroodje

Brabantian worstenbrood is a typical savoury pastry snack from the Dutch province of North-Brabant. The loaf is about six inches long and is filled with a minced beef sausage. In contrast to the "saucijzenbrood", the Brabantian worstenbrood is not made from puff pastry, but made from soft white bread dough. The worstenbrood originated as a way of preserving the meat by rolling it in dough and baking it. Traditionally it was mainly eaten during Christmas (especially after Midnight Mass) and Carnival. The snack is often served on terraces and cafes in the south of the country. It is also sold in other Dutch provinces, but mainly at supermarkets.

Since 1997, a competition is organized annually to select the best 'Brabantian worstenbrood baker'. It is broadcast on Dutch TV.

In March 2016, the Brabantian worstenbrood was included in the List of Intangible Heritage Netherlands.
