= Den Haan Rotterdam B.V. =

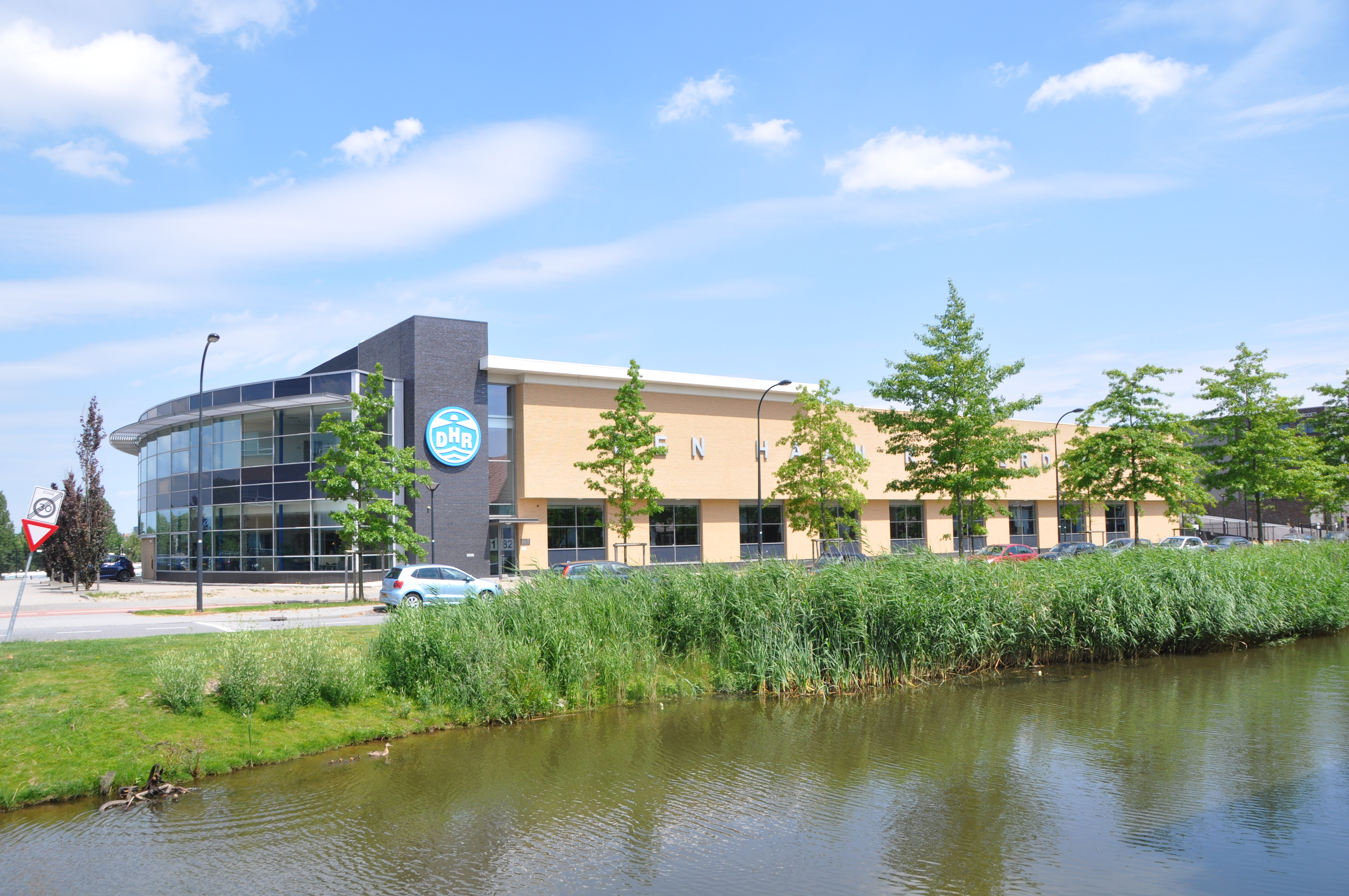
The factory in Capelle aan den IJssel

Den Haan Rotterdam B.V. is a metalwork manufacturing company specialising in navigation lights, searchlights, floodlights and ship's horns for the shipping industry. The company, originally established as a tinsmith workshop by Marinus den Haan on August 7, 1922, is located in Rotterdam, the Netherlands. The company also manufactures decorative brass nautical oil and electric lamps.

Working within maritime standards, the company imports semi-finished products from around the world, and exports its completed products under the logo "DHR" internationally. The company is a member of the Koninklijke Metaalunie and Scheepsbouw Nederland (the Royal Metal Union and Shipbuilding for the Netherlands).

As of 2012, the forth generation of family members commenced work with the company.

== History ==
Following the end of the First World War, Marinus den Haan took on two servants for his business venture despite the economic fallout from the world crisis. In 1936, the small team was joined by his son Marinus Jr, augmenting the workforce numbers to 16. Following the bombing on May 14, 1940, the company relocated to a modest residence on the Westzeedijk, enduring the wartime hardships. Subsequently, where the Second World War years were spent. During this period most employees were deported to Germany by the occupying forces, leaving only two senior staff members to sustain operations. Production was subsequently focussed on small oil lamps, bread tins, and baking ovens.

Marinus, the founder, died in 1947, with his son Marinus Jr. assuming leadership alongside his brother Cees. Marinus Jr., also known as Rienus, died on April 14, 2015.

During the early 1950s, mechanisation of production processes took place alongside the inception of producing ship lighting for ornamental applications. The demand for marine lighting steadily surged, unveiling opportunities within the export market. Initial orders primarily originated from Europe, gradually extending to include interest from the United States and Canada. The surge in demand for "nautical decorative lighting" resulted in a balanced turnover ratio between navigational and decorative lighting, reaching a 50-50 split. However, the sector of decorative lighting suffered significantly during the recession of 2009.

In 1970, updated regulations and standards were established for various aspects of maritime navigation lights. These regulations included an extension of visibility limits and precise specifications regarding the construction of light bulbs. A global consensus was reached stipulating that all seafaring vessels worldwide, commencing from 1976, and inland navigation vessels from 1984 onwards, were mandated to adhere to the newly established navigation light standards. In response to these developments, the manufacturing facility made a strategic shift from metal to plastic materials. Three distinct types of lanterns were introduced to the market, tailored for maritime shipping, inland navigation, and water sports respectively. Despite employing a workforce exceeding 60 individuals, the demand for these new lighting solutions posed a considerable challenge to meet. Moreover, a novel market opportunity emerged in the Middle and Far East regions, encompassing locales such as Singapore, Hong Kong, Taiwan, and South Korea, further expanding the company's reach and market presence.

Following extensive government trials, the lanterns manufactured by the factory gained official approval and were mandated for use on all government vessels. Subsequently, the company successfully introduced its proprietary design to equip submarines with navigation lights, after a period of development and refinement. This solution garnered interest from foreign governments, leading to the adoption of the company's lighting systems for their respective submarine fleets.

In 1987, Mario and Clifford, the third-generation sons of Marinus and Cees, assumed directorial positions within the company.

In early 1993, Mario den Haan acquired full ownership of the holding and management company, purchasing all shares from his father, Marinus, and his uncle, Cees, thereby consolidating his position as the sole proprietor of the family enterprise.

== Research and development ==
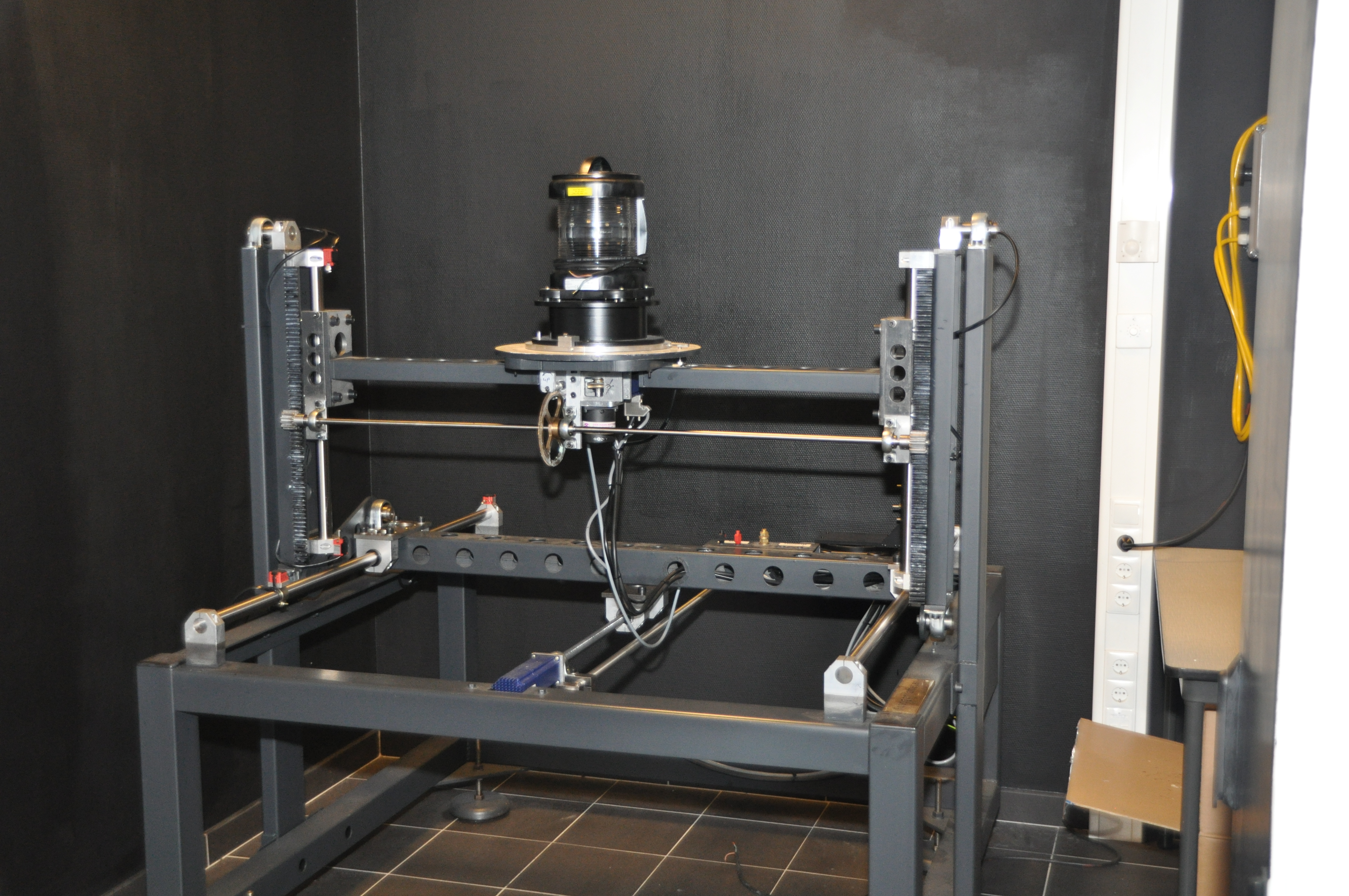
Test set of nautical light fixtures

The part of the Royal Netherlands Meteorological Institute that approved and certified the nautical lights, compasses and instruments in Rotterdam closed in 1988. This meant that all the lanterns had to be tested in-house and certificates provided. At the direction of government mandates, a room furnished with the necessary equipment was purchased. Regular inspections of the facility were promised by the Inspectie Leefomgeving en Transport.

After the inspection room commenced use, the testing of new products began. In 1992, this facility was renamed alongside its expansion for its use in research and development. This resulted in the creation of a new searchlight for the inland navigation. Due to the extensive drawings and reports from recognised institutes such as KEMA and TNO, approval for these products were quickly obtained from foreign inspection authorities.

After 1.5 years of research, the "Burtone" horn was brought to market. A TNO test report confirmed that the horns even meet German standards. The entire range ZEEKRO-search lights was tested and the entire structure was renovated to meet CE regulations.

In 2009, the noise test area was restructured due to increased air horns complaints from the immediate vicinity. In 2010, new products included a signal lamp with LED, and a new motor housing for searchlights. In 2012 development began for an inland navigation lantern with LED technology.

== Acquisitions ==
- 1979—the last Dutch competitor P.J. van den Bosch
- 1992—part of German company Brökelmann (BJB)
- 1993—the production of the “BURTONE”-ship's horns
- 1999—ZEEKRO, manufacturer of marine searchlights for inland vessels for more than 50 years

== Locations ==
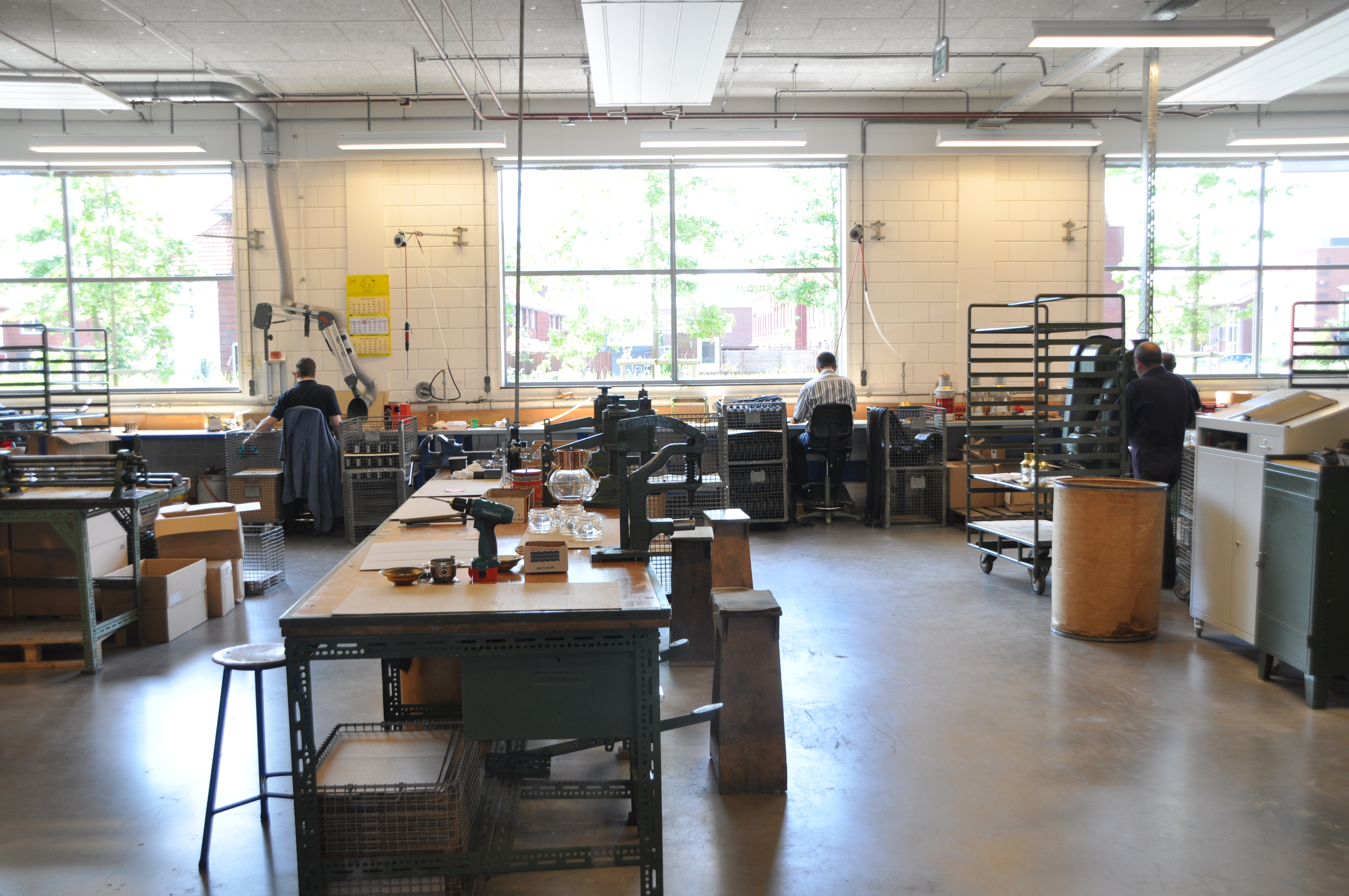
The workshop today

- Started at Zalmhaven in Rotterdam, with a workshop of 65 m²
- On 14 May 1940 house and the company was hit by the bombing of Rotterdam. Both buildings were destroyed. The company moved to Westzeedijk in Rotterdam for the war's duration.
- In the early 1950s it moved to the Hoornbrekerstraat, a building of 450 m² and expanded there.
- In 1962, a new factory building was built on the Wijnhaven with a total floor area of 3,150 m²
- In 1983, an adjoining plot of 1,000 m² became the site of the press, tooling shop and the shipping department.
- The current business had to be diverted to Capelle aan den IJssel and from January 2008 could be moved into a new facility of 5,000 m² of production, warehouse and office facilities .
