= Vilamajó =

Vilamajó may refer to:

== People ==
- Jaime Vilamajó (born 1959), Spanish racing cyclist
- Julio Vilamajó (1894–1948), Uruguayan architects

== Other uses ==
- Vilamajó House Museum, house in Uruguay
