= Culture House Eemhuis =

Building in Amersfoort

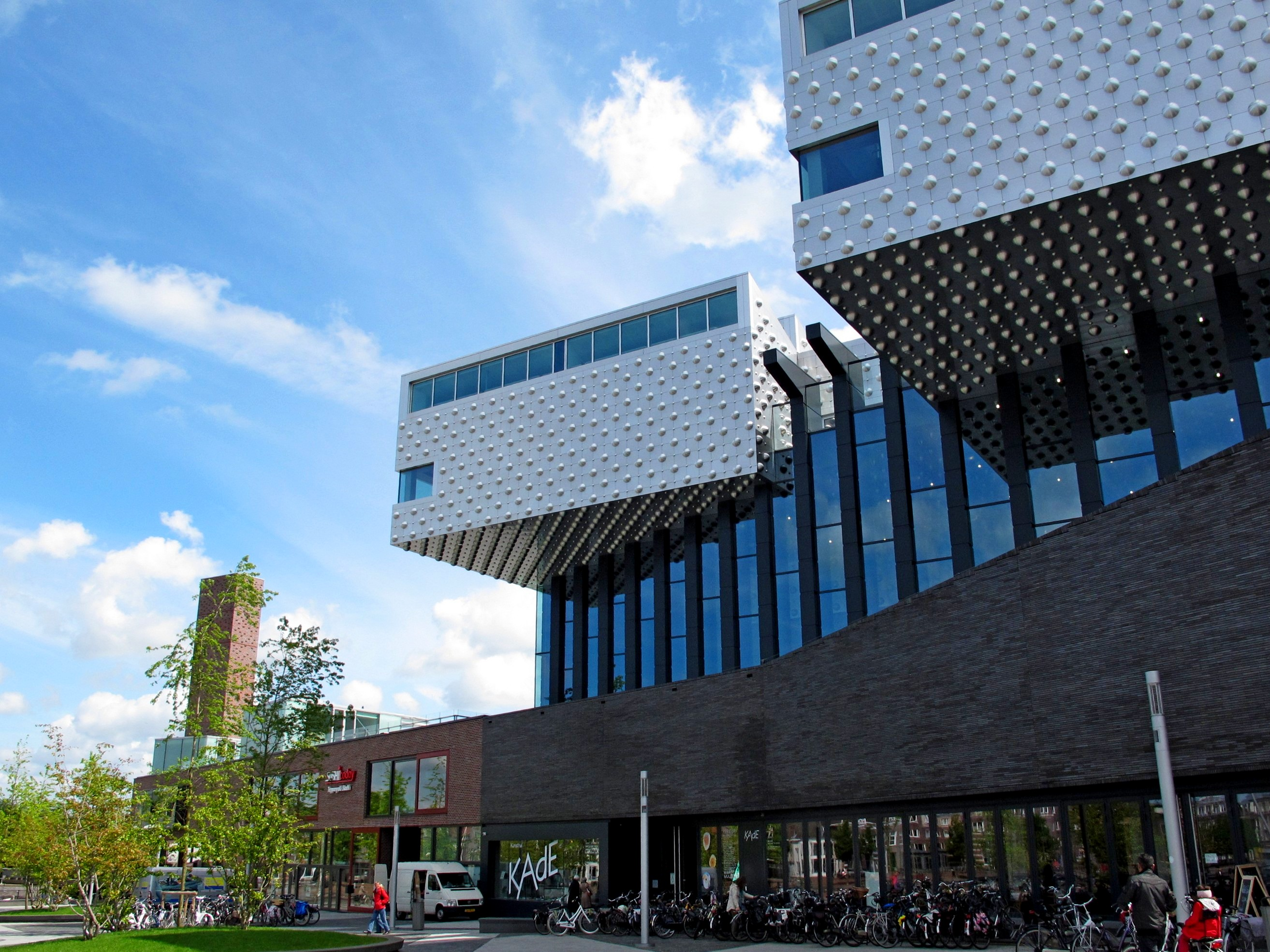
- Culture House Eemhuis in 2014
- Interactive map of Culture House Eemhuis
- Address: 3812 ED Amersfoort, Netherlands; Amersfoort; Netherlands
- Coordinates: 52.159347°N 5.382637°E
- Capacity: 172,222.57 sq ft (16,000.0 m^{2})
- Current use: Theatre, School, Cafe, Library, Exhibition hall, archives

Construction
- Opened: 2014
- Architect: Michiel Riedijk

Website
- heteemhuis.nl

Culture House Eemhuis is a culture house in Amersfoort, Netherlands was designed by Michiel Riedijk in 2013. The building houses cultural organizations including: a library, institutes of education, a school for arts, and spaces for art exhibition.

== History ==
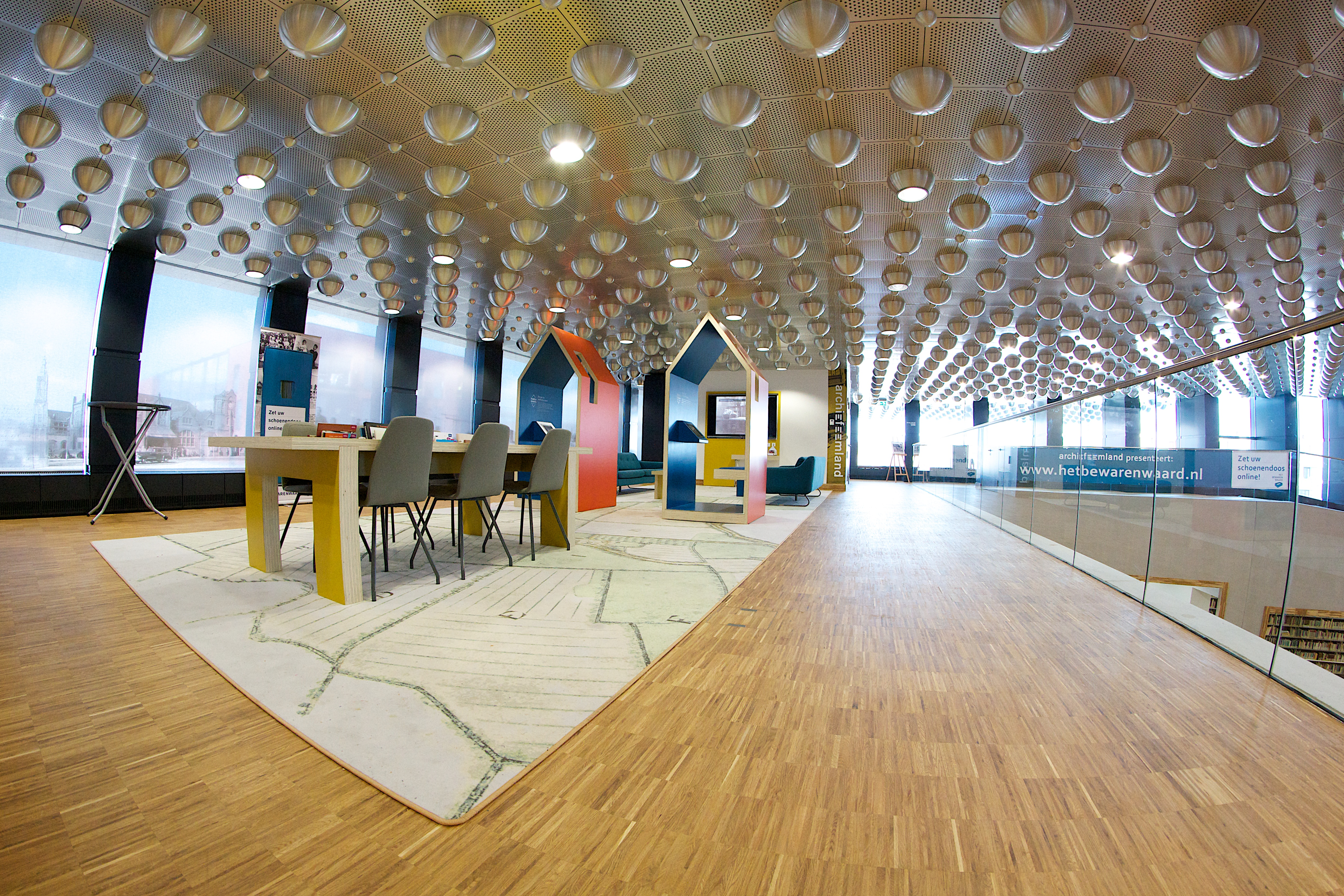
The archive in the Eemhuis in Amersfoort

In 2013 Michiel Riedijk of Neutelings Riedijk Architects was the architect for the Eemhuis. The builders were Euramax, Harry van Interieurbouw, IFS-SGT, and Q-railing: the building was completed in 2014.

In order to build the Eemhuis the municipality had to buy out a 30 lease from a tenant who had rights to the property. The construction also had a 5 million dollar cost overrun.

The front of the building has three cantilevered sections which hang over a plaza entrance. The structure houses a library, a school of the arts, and large exhibition spaces. On the first floor of the building there is a 5500 m library: considered one of the most beautiful of the 154 libraries in the Netherlands. Each of the cantilevered sections is used for different departments: music, arts and theatre. Community archives are found in the center of the building.

== See also ==
- Lindenberg Nijmegen Culture House
- Hollandsche Schouwburg
- Royal Theater Carré
- Flint (theatre)
