= Michiel Riedijk =

Dutch architect and professor (born 1964)

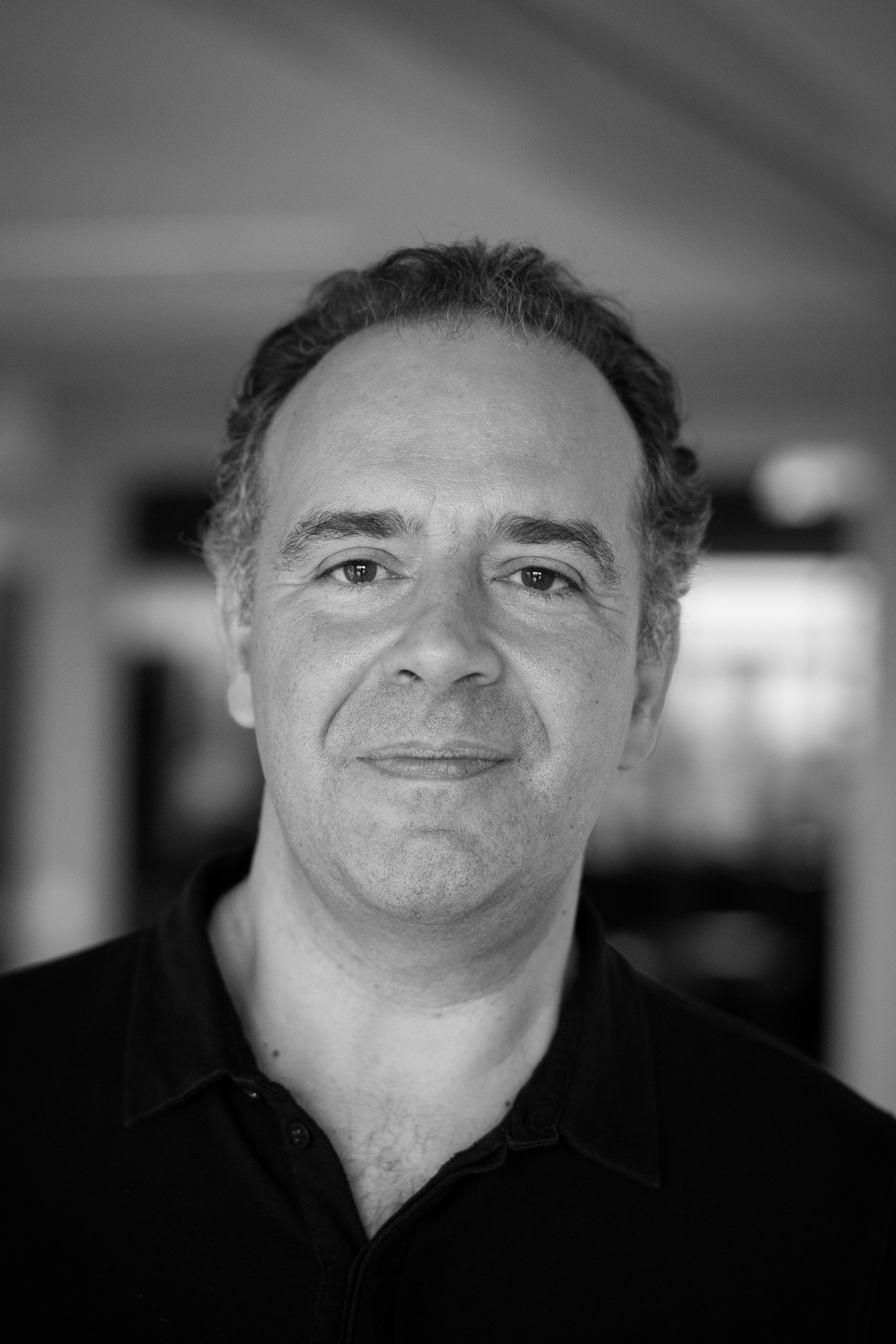
- Born: 1964 (age 61–62); Geldrop
- Occupation: co-founder Neutelings Riedijk Architects

Michiel Riedijk (Geldrop, 1964) is a Dutch architect and professor at the Technical University Delft. He is co-founder of the architecture office Neutelings Riedijk Architects in Rotterdam, Netherlands.

== Life and work ==
Michiel Riedijk studied architecture at the Technical University Delft from 1983 until 1989. He worked with architect Julliette Bekkering from 1989 until 1991 and in 1992 he founded Neutelings Riedijk Architects in collaboration with Willem Jan Neutelings.

In September 2007 Riedijk accepted full professorship as chair of Public Building and Architectural Compositions at the faculty of Architecture at the Technical University Delft.

Michiel Riedijk regularly lectures at universities, conferences and cultural institutions worldwide. He taught at the Technical University of Eindhoven, the Academies of Architecture in Amsterdam, Rotterdam and Maastricht, and the Berlage Institute in Rotterdam. In 2002, he was a guest professor at the RWTH Aachen.

Michiel Riedijk is recognized as international fellow of the RIBA.

Neutelings Riedijk Architects' work has been characterized as having a sculptural, often anthropomorphic quality and a playfulness of form while following a clear rationality in programming and context. They believe that contemporary ornamentation results in buildings with a powerful expression that create new local identities in a globalized world. In 2018 Neutelings Riedijk Architects published the book ‘Ornament & Identity’, a multi-layered essay that presents the results of their search for expression and identity through a selection of thirty-six of their projects.

Key projects are the Naturalis Biodiversity Center in Leiden, Museum Aan de Stroom or MAS in Antwerp, the Netherlands Institute for Sound and Vision in Hilversum, The City Hall Deventer, Culturehouse Rozet in Arnhem, and Culture House Eemhuis in Amersfoort. The work of Neutelings Riedijk Architects has been widely published and exhibitioned, and has won a variety of international awards and nominations, such as the Gouden Piramide, the Dutch Building of the Year, the Abe Bonnemaprijs, the Rotterdam Maaskant Prize and the Mies van der Rohe Award shortlist. Their work has been selected for exhibitions in Paris, New York, Los Angeles, Venice, Beijing, Sao Paulo, Barcelona and Moscow.

== Selected projects ==
- Museum | Naturalis Biodiversity Center | Leiden, Netherlands (2019)
- Flemish Government | Herman Teirlinck Building | Brussels, Belgium (2017)
- City Hall | Deventer, Netherlands (2017)
- Culturehouse | Rozet | Arnhem, Netherlands (2013)
- Culturehouse | Eemhuis | Amersfoort, Netherlands (2013)
- Museum aan de Stroom | MAS | Antwerp, Belgium (2010)
- Dutch Tax Office | Walterboscomplex | Apeldoorn, Netherlands (2007)
- Museum and archives | Netherlands Institute for Sound and Vision | Hilversum, Netherlands (2006)
- Shipping and Transport College | Rotterdam, Netherlands (2005)
- Lake Side Housing | The Sphinxes | Huizen, Netherlands (2003)
- Theatre & Art Centre | STUK | Leuven, Belgium (2002)
- University Building | Minnaert | Utrecht, Netherlands (1997)

== Publications ==
- Ornament & Identity – Neutelings Riedijk 2018. ISBN 978-3-7757-4215-3
- De doorsnede. Onderweg! Vijftien ontwerpen voor Transit Oriented Development (TOD) aan de Zaancorridor, (pp. 23–27), Geerts F., Riedijk M., Amsterdam (2014): BNA, branchevereniging voor Nederlandse architectenbureaus.
- Het handschrift van de architect : schetsen van Nicolaas Lansdorp en tijdgenoten, Bergeijk, H van, Riedijk, M (Eds.), Nijmegen 2014.
- Integraal ontwerpen van infrastructuren: aanzet tot een agenda voor onderwijs en onderzoek, Riedijk M., Sijmons DF., Hertogh, MJCM, Rots, JG, Geerts, F, Schmets, AJM, Velde, JRT van der, Boer, JJ de, Wilbers, J Delft: TU Delft Integrated Infrastructure Design 2013.
- Fragmented panoramas. The city as a project, Riedijk M., (pp. 337–340) Berlin 2013: Ruby Press.
- El Croquis 159 – Neutelings Riedijk 2003-2012, Levene, R. (ed.), Madrid 2012. ISBN 978-84-88386-694
- Architecture as a craft, Riedijk M, Amsterdam 2011: SUN. ISBN 978-94-6105-1035
- The Drawing, Riedijk, M., 010 Publishers 2009. ISBN 978-90-6450-697-0
- At Work, Neutelings WJ., Riedijk M., Rotterdam 2004. ISBN 90-6450-508-X
- Aan het Werk, Neutelings WJ., Riedijk M., Rotterdam 2004. ISBN 90-6450-527-6
- Neutelings Riedijk Architects, Sanguigni G., Rome 2011. ISBN 978-88-7864-074-0
- El Croquis 94 – Neutelings Riedijk 1992-1999, Levene, R. (ed.), Madrid 1999. ASIN B000QB38MA.
