= Riedijk =

Riedijk is a Dutch surname. Notable people with the surname include:

- Michiel Riedijk (born 1964), Dutch architect
- Yago Riedijk, Dutch member of ISIL

== Other ==
- Neutelings Riedijk Architects, Dutch architecture firm
