= Miguel Ángel Odriozola =

Uruguayan architect and urban planner

Miguel Ángel Odriozola Odriozola (Colonia Department, 29 January 1921 - 30 November 2003) was a Uruguayan architect and urban planner.

One of his first works was his collaboration with Julio Vilamajó in Villa Serrana, in the 1940s. But his most important achievement was in Colonia del Sacramento, the most appreciated colonial settlement in Uruguay, whose historic quarter was included as a UNESCO World Heritage Site in 1995.

== Publications ==
- Colonia del Sacramento (1984, with Omar Moreira)
