= Villa Serrana =

Tourist location in Uruguay

Coordinates: 34°17′S 54°59′W

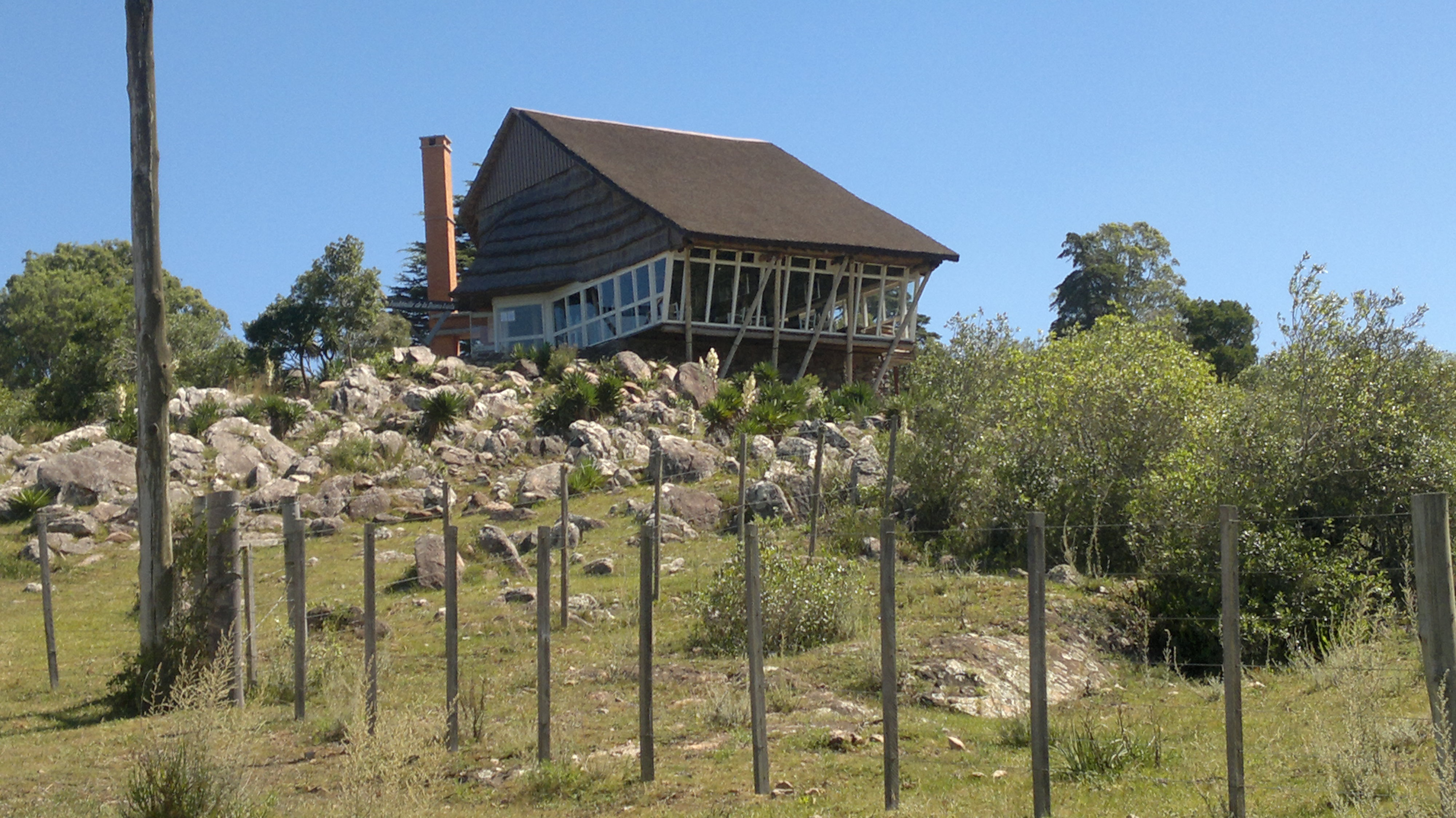
Ventorrillo de la Buena Vista, Villa Serrana.

Villa Serrana is a tourist location in Lavalleja Department, Uruguay. It is located 25 km northeast of Minas.

It was established in 1946 according to plans by architect Julio Vilamajó, being his last significant work; the young architect Miguel Ángel Odriozola was an important collaborator.

Nowadays it has fewer than 100 people living there permanently.
