= Netherlands Maritime University Rotterdam; Master Shipping and Transport =

Coordinates: 51.9019°N 4.4609°E

The Netherlands Maritime University Rotterdam (STC-NMU) is a specialised educational institute founded by the STC Group (Shipping and Transport College), Rotterdam. It offers a specialised 40-week Master Shipping and Transport program that trains students for management positions in the shipping and transport industry.

== Learning objectives ==
The program teaches tactical and strategic levels of a variety of subjects, such as:

- Understanding means of transport and principles of all inbound and outbound maritime port modalities.
- Design, control and management of ports, shipping lines and freight traffic flows.
- Cross-functional and interdisciplinary cooperation between all actors in the (maritime) industry (during planning, design and operational processes).
- Understanding maritime politics, maritime political issues within the international arena.
- Understanding the different organisational perspectives, e.g. strategy, crewing and manning (human resources management), fleet and cargo operations, shipping finance and accounting, management, (organisation) policies, etc.
- Understanding the implications in respect to social and environmental welfare.

The program also includes simulator assisted applications that position participants in a situation in which they must act upon a practical management problem. Participants are challenged to bring solutions and defend their findings in front of a group or in plenary settings.

== Entry qualification ==
Students must have a bachelor degree in a relevant subject and at least two years working experience, or, a bachelor's degree and at least two years of working experience in shipping, transport, logistics or a related industry.

Potential participants have such backgrounds as:

- Seafaring officers, needing the necessary tools to take up an onshore occupation after a number of years at sea.
- Current staff ashore, needing extra training to extend their knowledge and skills on shipping, supply chain management and intermodal and multimodal transport.
- Employees in specialised or technical related functions, who aspire to a management function.

Graduates have moved on to positions in: maritime and logistic operations such as port management organisations, shipping companies, international logistics providers, port authorities, governmental institutes and consultancy firms.

== The program ==
The 40-week program is divided into five modules. The fifth module is dedicated to the thesis project, which takes around four months. Participants can do the thesis in their home country, at their own employer or as an internship within a company in the Rotterdam area.

The program comprises five different modules, including a specialisation. Each module is split up into various courses. In total there are 21 courses and 2 specialisations.

Participants are challenged to approach maritime issues on tactical and strategic level from different perspectives:

- Roles in the supply chain, e.g. freight forwarder, stevedore, logistics company, carrier, shipbroker, port authority, governmental body.
- Different organisational perspectives, e.g. legal, human resource management, operations, finance and accounting, organisation, company policies, etc.

Participants are required to define their own thesis projects in close cooperation with the thesis supervisor and to find a suitable company that will ‘sponsor’ the thesis. The thesis must demonstrate that the participant has acquired the necessary skills and knowledge to approach a management problem in shipping.
