= Vilamajó House Museum =

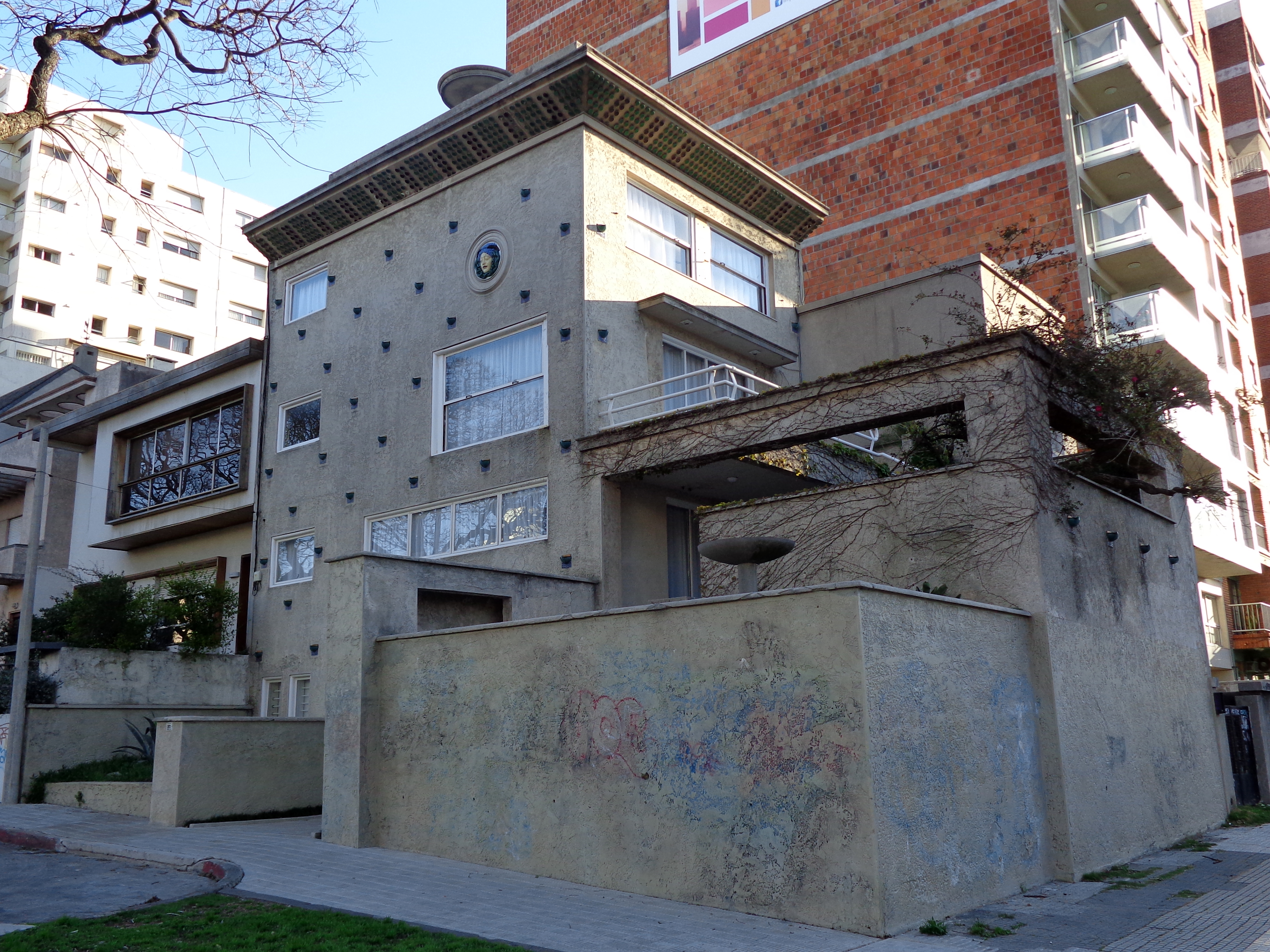
- Established: July 12, 2012
- Location: Domingo Cullen 895, esquina Av. Sarmiento, Montevideo, Uruguay
- Coordinates: 34°54′54″S 56°09′48″W
- Type: Modern architecture House Museum

The Vilamajó House Museum (Spanish: Museo Casa Vilamajó) is located in the house that the architect Julio Vilamajó built for his family in 1930 in Montevideo, being the first modern dwelling to open its doors as a museum house in Uruguay. The Vilamajó House Museum is the materialization of an initiative of the School of Architecture at the University of the Republic which, in agreement with the Ministry of Education and Culture, owner of the property, opened its doors to the public in May 2012. The museum has been envisaged as a research and promotion center addressing the life and work of Vilamajó and of architecture and design as disciplines open to the society.

== The house ==
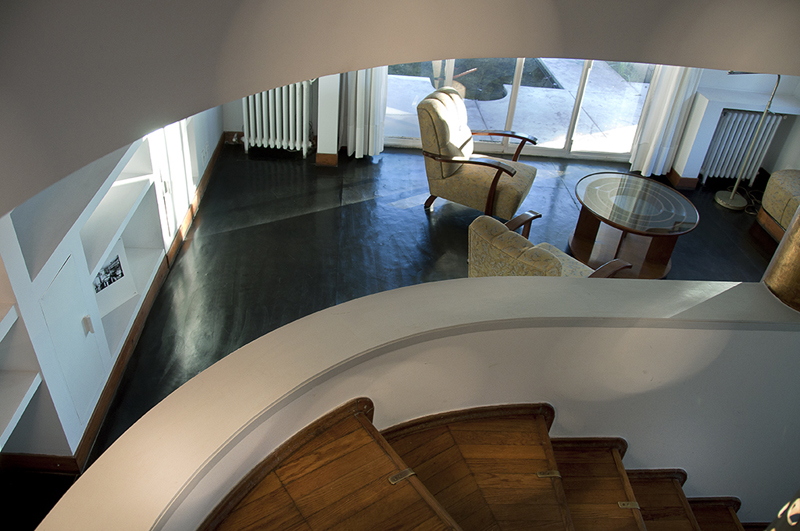
Interior view

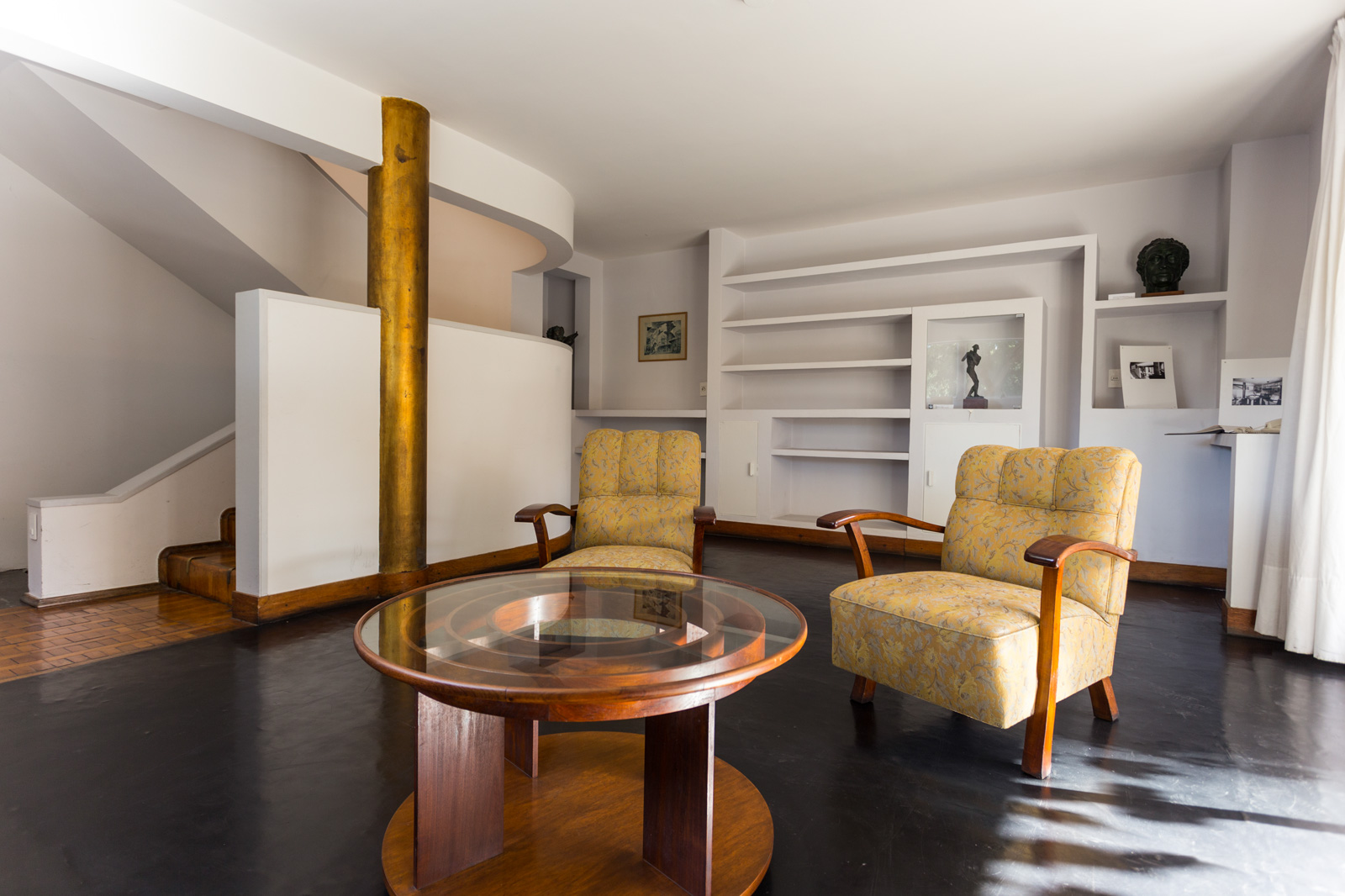
Interior view

The house that Vilamajó built for his family in 1930 in Montevideo is the first modern dwelling to open its doors as a museum in Uruguay. It is one of a growing series of initiatives which have arisen around the globe and have intensified in the last decade, including international examples such as the homes of Frank Lloyd Wright, Le Corbusier, Rudolph Schindler, Walter Gropius, Richard Neutra, and Charles and Ray Eames.

The recovery, restoration and adaptation of Julio Vilamajó's house for its new role as a museum house is an important step forward. The building and its facilities have been fully recovered and thanks to the careful restoration of its interiors, including the original furniture, artwork and personal belongings, the former attractions of the professor's home can now be appreciated. Its gardens have also been remodeled, reincorporating plant species which were initially included there.

On the occasion of the 2010 call for entries of the Cultural Incentive Fund, CONAEF, Ministry of Education and Culture, 2010, the Vilamajó House Museum [MCV for its Spanish acronym] project ranked first in the Museum category and was declared of Cultural and Artistic Interest.

== Exhibition center ==
The dwelling itself, a modern and unique piece of work declared a National Historic Landmark in 1990, is the main component and an ideal platform for housing a permanent exhibition on the work of Vilamajó, and for the regular showcasing of temporary exhibitions related not only to architecture and design, but also to related areas. Guided tours, book presentations, events related to neighborhood cultural circuits are currently undertaken, also including the School of Architecture and the School of Engineering, the National Museum of Visual Arts and events in collaboration with other museums and cultural institutions in Uruguay country and abroad.

=== Temporary exhibitions ===
- JUAN FALKENSTEIN, el tiempo entre diseños. 2015
- RETRATOS «Entrevistas 1 + Entrevistas 2», muestra de fotografía. 2014
- EL VENTORRILLO DE LA BUENA VISTA, muestra de fotografía. 2014
- PEDRO CRACCO. Anatomía artística de los vegetales. 2014
- JULIO VILAMAJÓ, selección de obra gráfica. 2013

=== Interviews ===
Some of the architects and designers interviewed at Vilamajó House Museum were: Paulo Mendes da Rocha, Daniela Colafranceschi, Anna Calvera, Zissis Kotionis, Rodrigo Pérez de Arce, José María Sáez, Willem Jan Neutelings, Yoshi Tsukamoto, Bernardo Ynzenga, Iñaqui Ábalos, Sou Fujimoto, Renata Sentkiewicz and Mónica Bertolino.

== Visits ==
The museum is open on Wednesdays and Saturdays from 10 am to 4 pm. Admission is free of charge. There are guided tours at 10 am, 11 am, 12 noon, 1 pm, 2 pm and 3 pm (last visit of the day). Groups of up to 10 persons are admitted.
