= Lindenberg Nijmegen Culture House =

- Lindenberg Cultuurhuis - Nijmegen
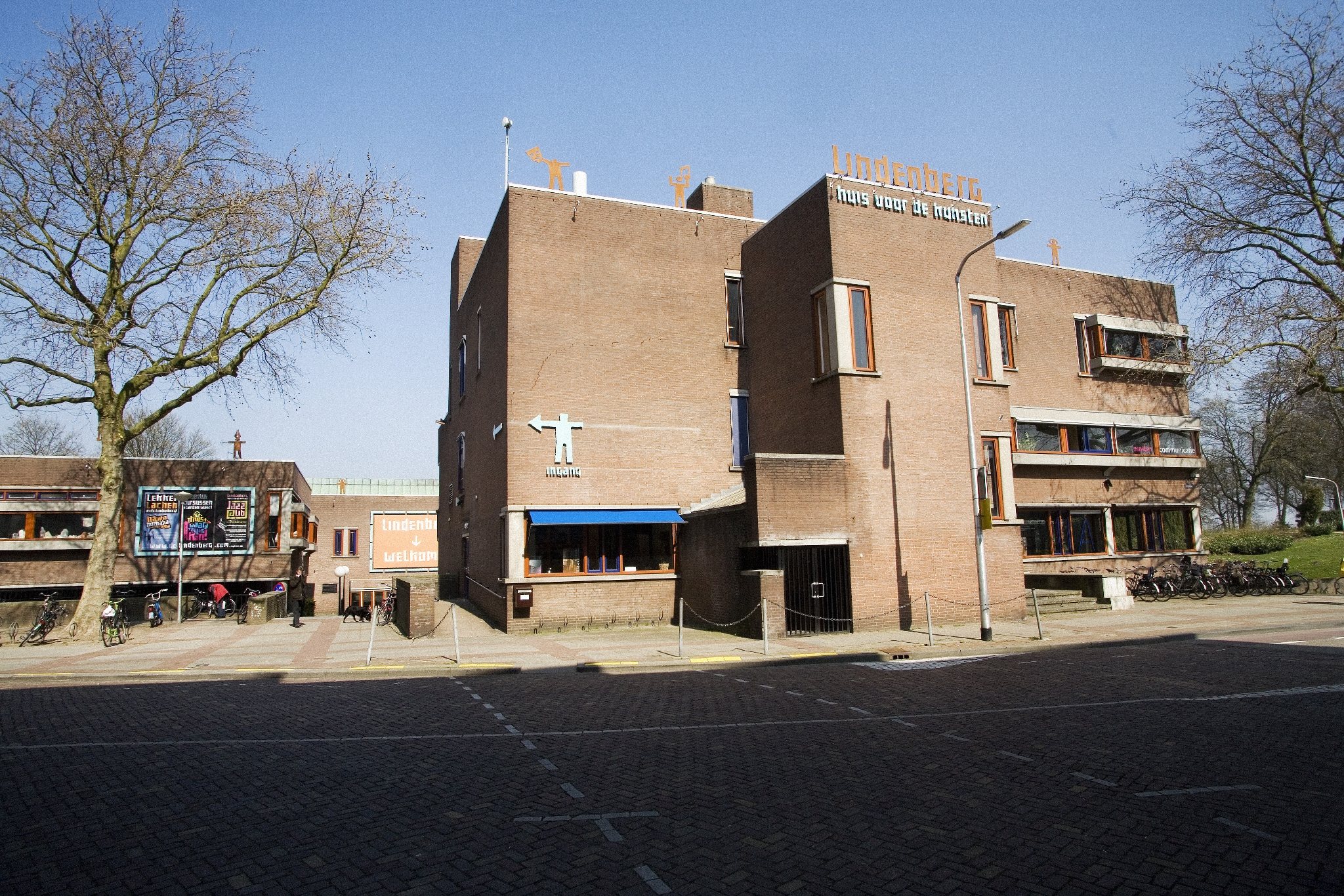
- The Lindenberg Culture House
- Interactive map of Lindenberg Nijmegen Culture House
- Address: Ridderstraat 23, 6511 TM Nijmegen; Nijmegen; Netherlands
- Coordinates: 51.848520°N 5.868633°E
- Owner: ACBN Evenementenbureau Nijmegen
- Operator: Teddy Vrijmoet (director)
- Current use: Theatre, School, Cafe, Library, Hall

Construction
- Opened: 1972
- Years active: 1972-present

Website
- www.delindenberg.com

The Lindenberg Nijmegen Culture House, founded in 1972, was a project opened by the Netherlands Minister of Culture, Piet Engels. It is a cultural house (theatre) in Nijmegen, Netherlands, on the Ridderstraat next to the Valkhof Museum. The Lindenberg operates theatre programs, hosts performances, hosts education courses, and has a cafe. The organization also receives a subsidy from the government.

== History ==
The Minister of Culture, Piet Engels opened the institution in 1972. Initially there were free academies, a music school and a public library. In the year 2000, the Lindenberg was suffering financially. The organization began to generate profits by raising prices for their clients, and eliminating some activities.

The Lindenberg is now one of 30 Nijmegen cultural organizations to be awarded a government subsidy. The Lindenberg also hosts exhibitions which commemorate the history of Nijmegen.

In 2018, Teddy Vrijmoet became the director of the theatre. She replaced Ilse Verburgh, who left in 2017.

=== Courses ===
The Lindenberg also offers courses for students. Some courses include DJing, urban dance and comedy. The Lindenberg also offers individual music lessons for music students.

=== Valkhof Hall ===
Lindenberg has a large hall which can accommodate up to 1,200 people. The hall is host to lectures, weddings, meetings and workshops.

== See also ==
- Culture House Eemhuis
- Hollandsche Schouwburg
- Royal Theater Carré
- Flint (theatre)
