= Piet Engels =

Dutch politician (1923–1994)

His Excellency Piet Engels
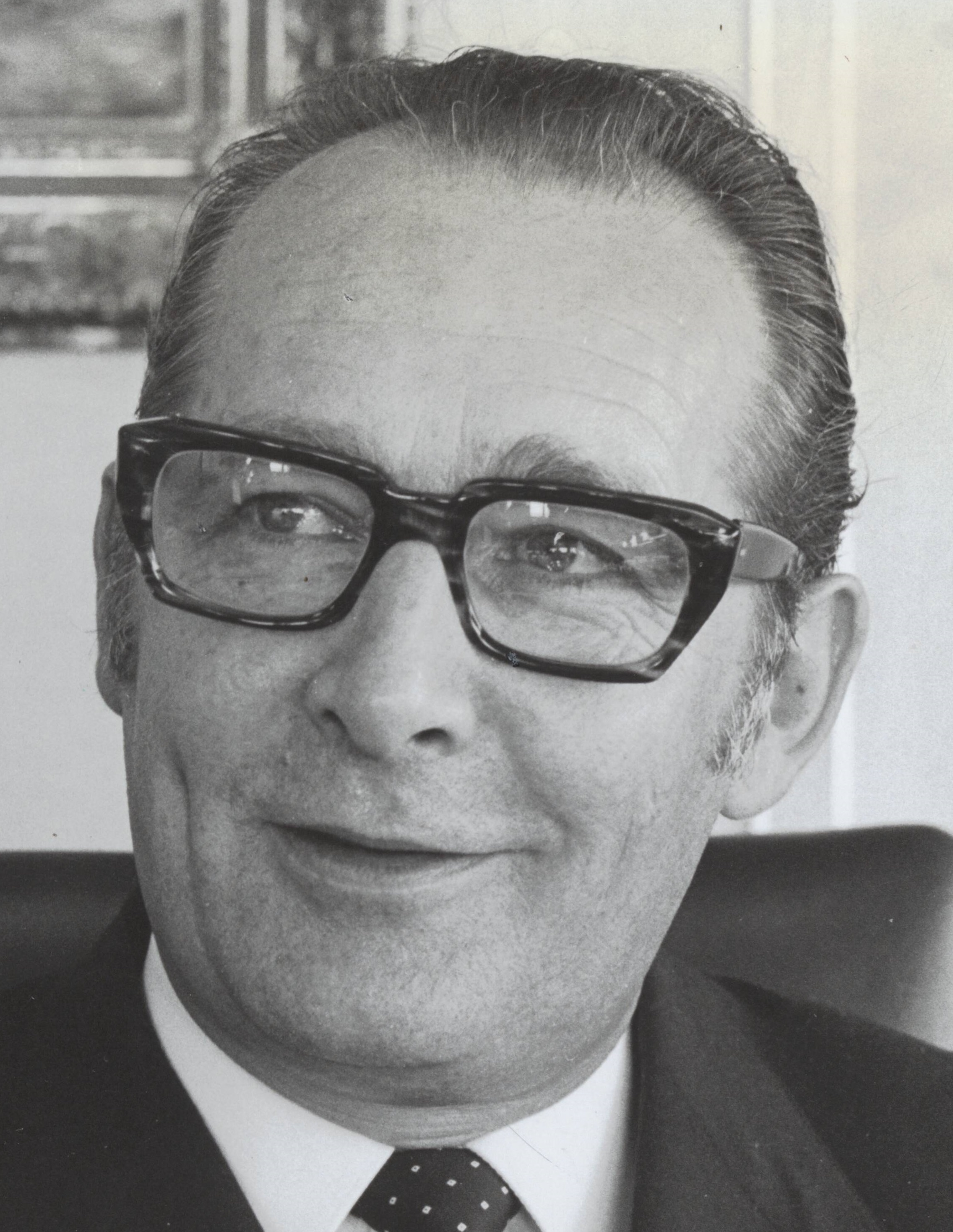
- Engels in 1971

Minister of Culture, Recreation and Social Work
- In office 6 July 1971 – 11 May 1973
- Prime Minister: Barend Biesheuvel
- Preceded by: Marga Klompé
- Succeeded by: Harry van Doorn

Parliamentary leader in the House of Representatives
- In office 28 April 1971 – 11 May 1971
- Preceded by: Norbert Schmelzer
- Succeeded by: Gerard Veringa
- Parliamentary group: Catholic People's Party

Member of the House of Representatives
- In office 5 June 1963 – 6 July 1971
- Parliamentary group: Catholic People's Party

Personal details
- Born: Peter Joseph Engels; 25 September 1923 Schaesberg, Netherlands
- Died: 13 April 1994 (aged 70) Leeuwarden, Netherlands
- Party: Christian Democratic Appeal (from 1980)
- Other political affiliations: Catholic People's Party (until 1980)
- Occupation: Politician · Social worker · Nonprofit director

Peter Joseph "Piet" Engels (25 September 1923 – 13 April 1994) was a Dutch politician of the defunct Catholic People's Party (KVP) now merged into the Christian Democratic Appeal (CDA).

== Career ==
Piet Engels opened the Lindenberg Nijmegen Culture House in 1972. Initially there were free academies a music school and a Public Library.

== Decorations ==
Honours
Ribbon bar	Honour	Country	Date
	Knight of the Order of the Netherlands Lion	Netherlands	8 June 1973

Party political offices
Preceded by Norbert Schmelzer	Parliamentary leader of the Catholic People's Party in the House of Representatives; 1971	Succeeded by Gerard Veringa
Political offices
Preceded by Marga Klompé	Minister of Culture, Recreation and Social Work; 1971–1973	Succeeded by Harry van Doorn
