= Museum aan de Stroom =

Museum in Antwerp, Belgium

Museum aan de Stroom (MAS)
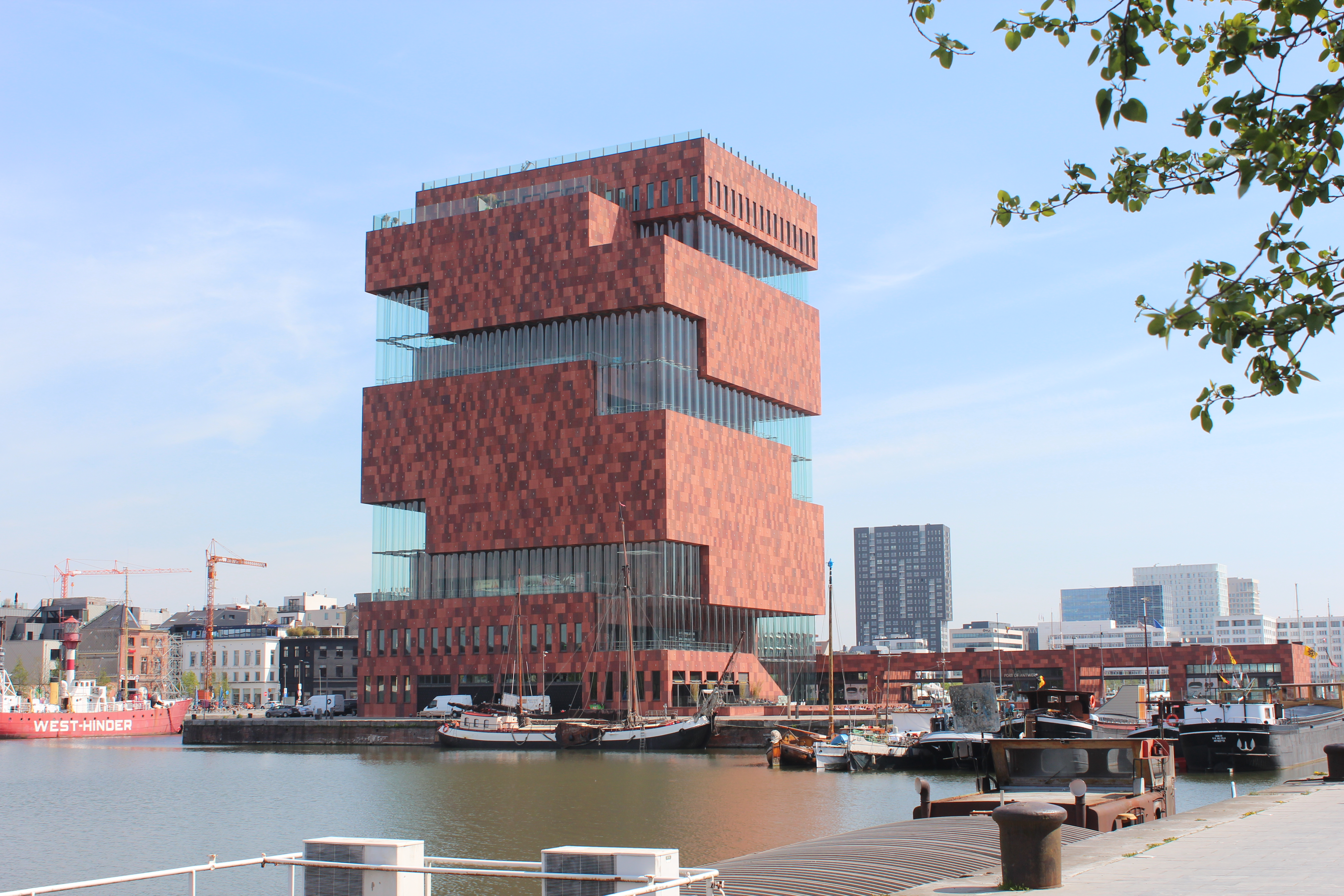
- The MAS (2016)
- Established: May 17, 2011
- Location: Antwerp, Belgium
- Coordinates: 51.2290°N 4.4048°E
- Type: Cultural history
- Architect: Neutelings Riedijk Architects
- Website: https://mas.be/en

The Museum aan de Stroom (MAS; Dutch for: Museum by the Stream) is a museum located along the river Scheldt in the Eilandje district of Antwerp, Belgium. It opened in May 2011 and is the largest museum in Antwerp.

== History ==
In 1998 the Antwerp city council decided to build the museum at the Hanzestedenplaats. On 14 September 2006 the first brick of the building was laid. In 2010 museum objects arrived from various other museums like the Ethnographic Museum and the Maritime Museum (previously in the city castle called Het Steen), which both ceased to exist. The museum opened for the public on 17 May 2011.

== Design ==
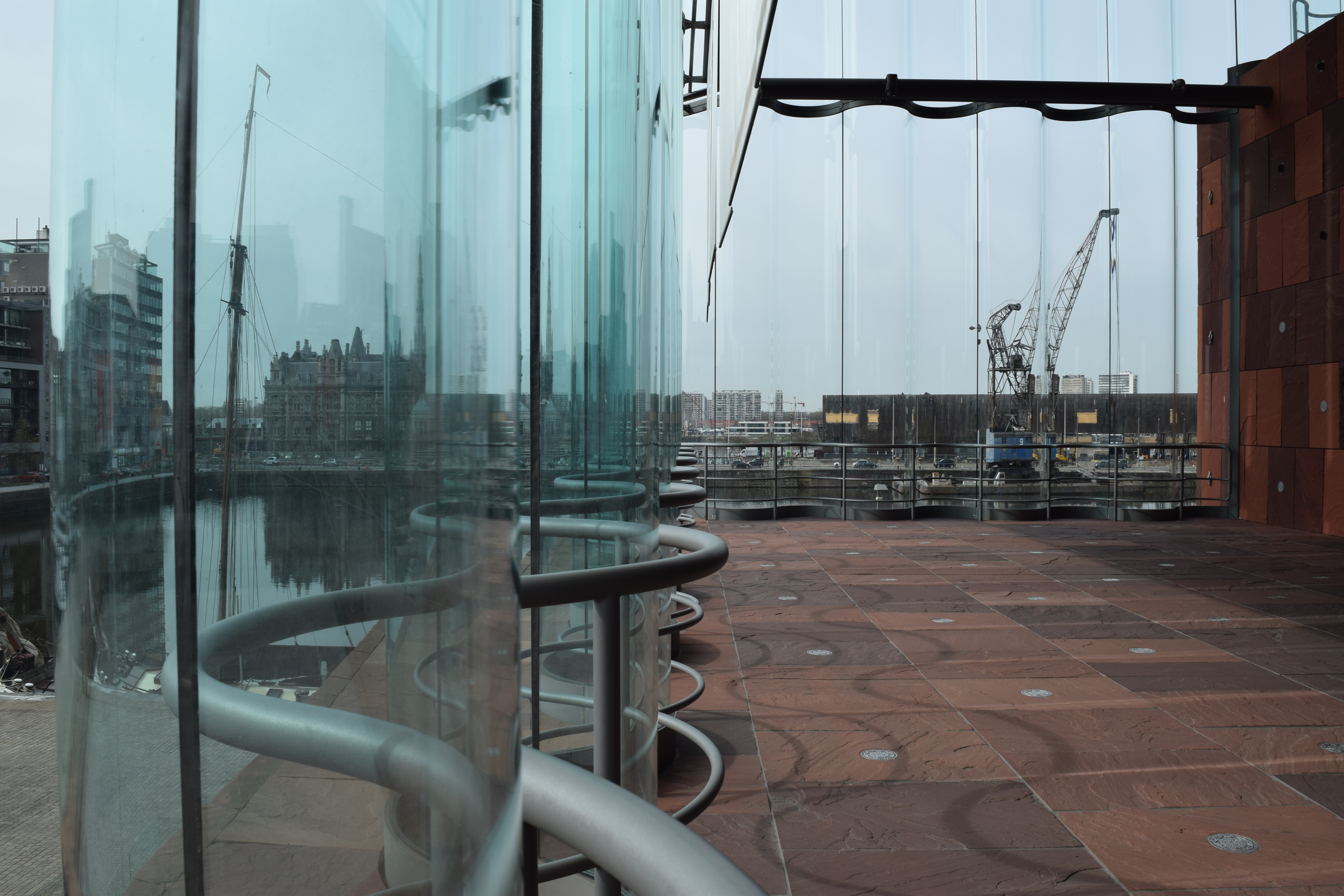
Curved glass panel construction as seen from inside the MAS

The 60-metre-high (200 ft) MAS was designed by Neutelings Riedijk Architects. The façade was constructed using Indian red sandstone and curved glass panels. It is an example of postmodern architecture. The MAS houses 470,000 objects, most of which are kept in storage. The first visitors' gallery is the "visible store", which contains 180,000 items. The building is located on the spot where the Hanzahuis used to stand. International merchants worked and resided at the Hanzehuis. In the nineteenth century a fire destroyed the building.

== Collection and exhibitions ==
The central focus of the MAS is Antwerp and its connection to the world. The MAS collection ranges from maritime objects which document international trade and shipping, to the history, art and culture of the port city of Antwerp and to art and culture from Europe, Africa, America, Asia and Oceania. The MAS develops thematic exhibitions which connect local and global culture, art and history. The museum is committed to informing the public using new media and immersive presentations. The museum was internationally awarded for its MAS IN YOUNG HANDS initiative, which involves youngsters from very diverse backgrounds as event organizers and curators.
