= Neutelings Riedijk Architects =

Neutelings Riedijk Architects is an architecture firm based in Rotterdam, the Netherlands, founded by Willem Jan Neutelings and Michiel Riedijk in 1987.

== Work and design philosophy ==
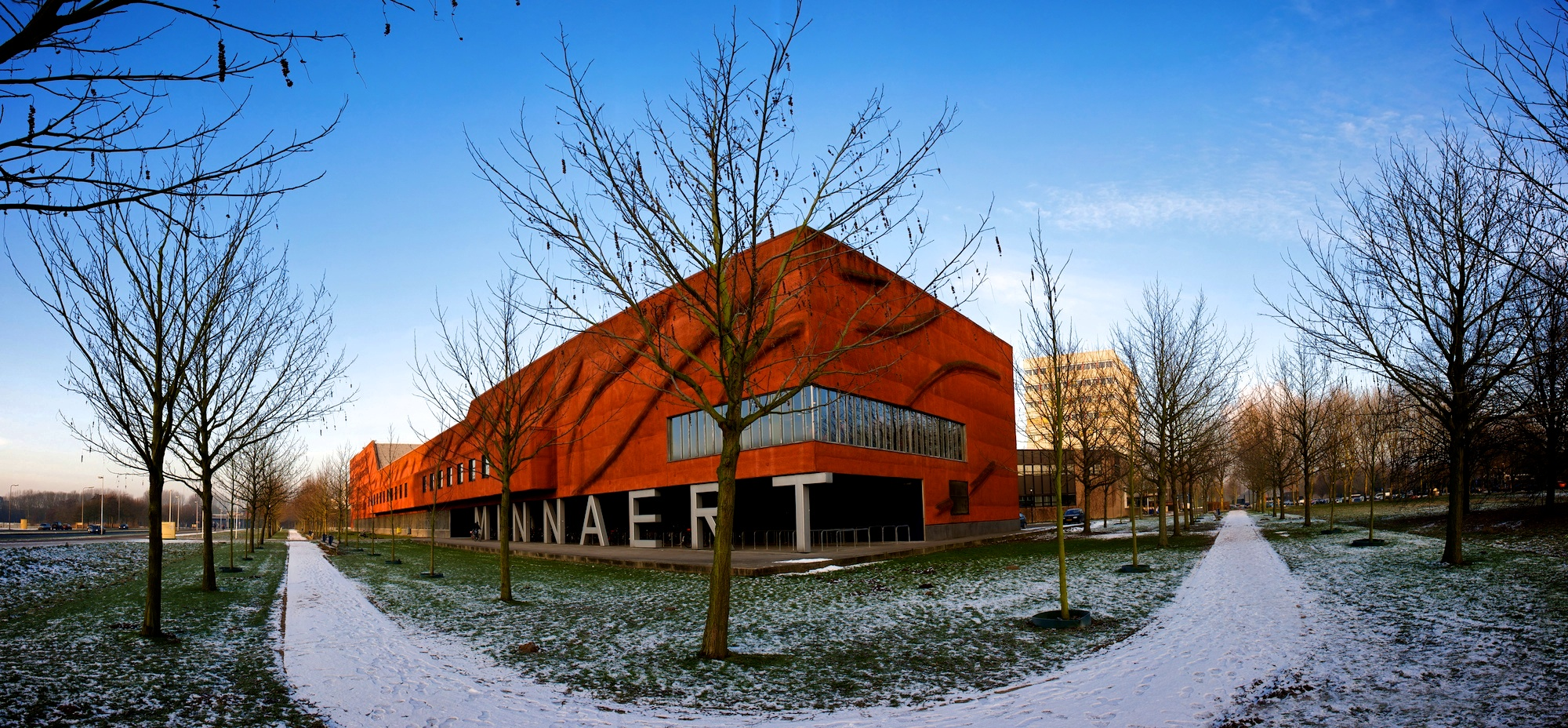
Minnaert University building, Utrecht, 2007

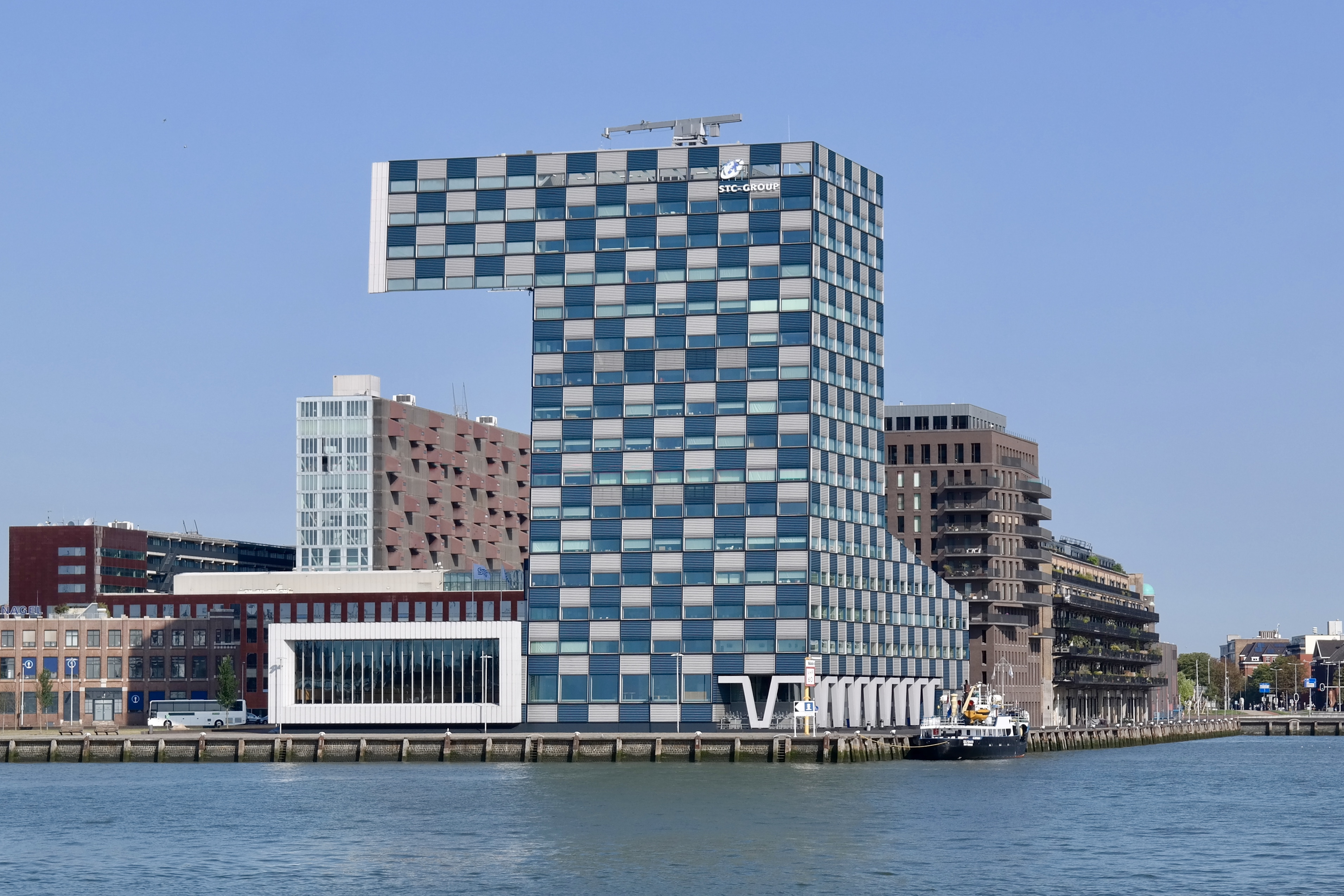
Corrugated panels at the Shipping and Transport College in Rotterdam, 2005

MAS (Museum aan de Stroom), Antwerp, completed 2011

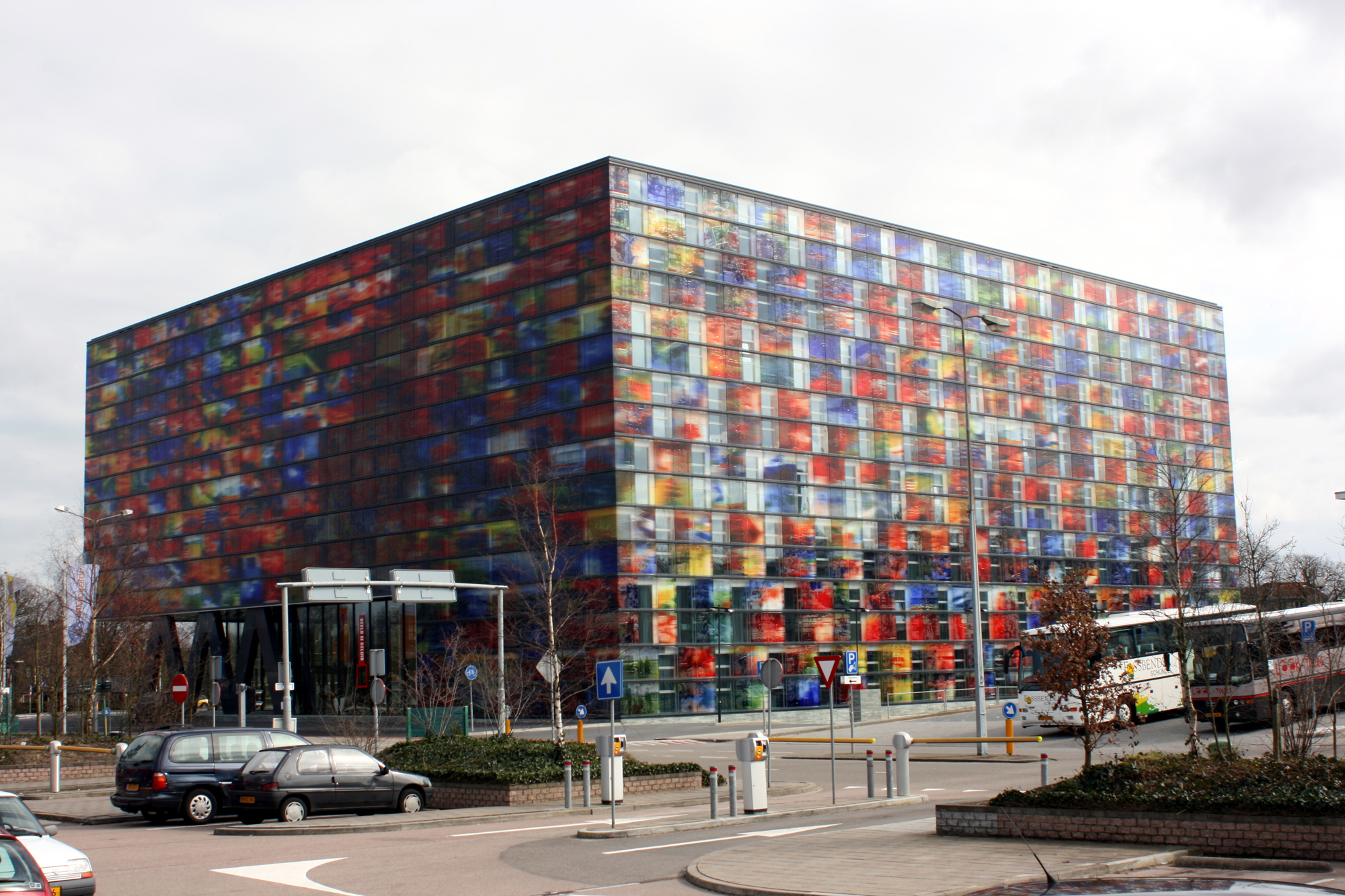
Netherlands Institute for Sound and Vision in Hilversum, 2006

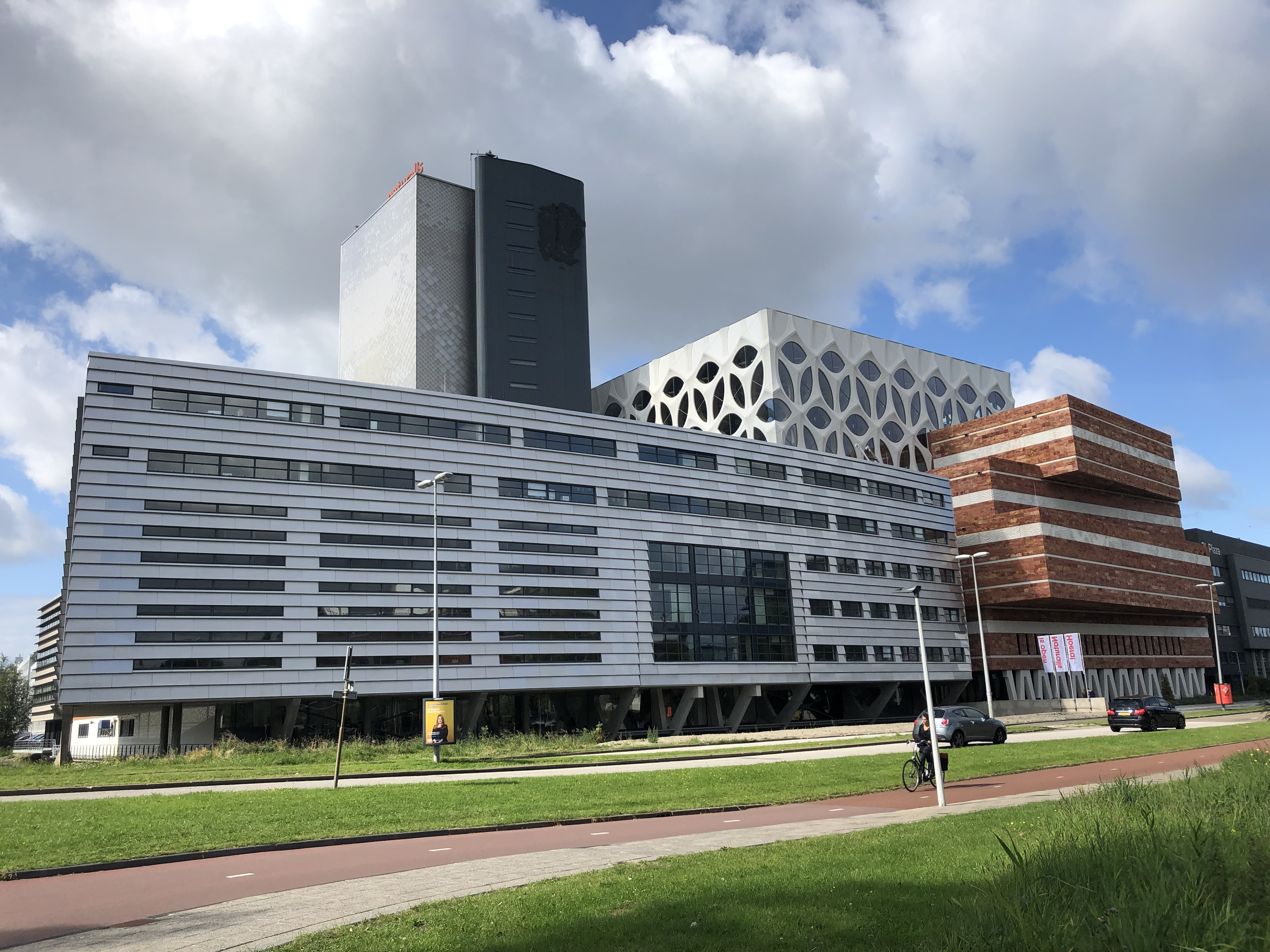
Naturalis Biodiversity Center in Leiden, 2019

The work of Neutelings Riedijk Architects has been characterized as having a sculptural, often anthropomorphic quality and a playfulness of form while following a clear rationality in programming and context. Their use of familiar forms and materials grounds the strangeness and baroque involutions that give the works a distinct identity and power. Because of the public nature of most of their work, Neutelings Riedijk see the sculptural quality as a way to communicate the building's role within its urban or social context.

Neutelings Riedijk Architects' earlier work consists mostly of public housing and utilitarian buildings such as office buildings, fire stations, and hotels. They have since moved on to designing complex assignments for public and cultural institutions such as museums, libraries, performing arts venues, concert halls, and educational facilities. Their most acclaimed buildings are the Naturalis Biodiversity Center in Leiden (2019), City Hall Deventer (2016), Museum aan de Stroom in Antwerp (2010), the Netherlands Institute for Sound and Vision in Hilversum (2006), the Shipping and Transport College Group in Rotterdam (2005), and the culture house Rozet in Arnhem (2013) and Culture House Eemhuis in Amersfoort (2013).

== Selected projects ==
=== Realized projects ===
- Naturalis Biodiversity Center | Leiden, The Netherlands (2019)
- Flemish Government | Herman Teirlinck Building | Brussels, Belgium (2017)
- City Hall and Offices | Deventer, The Netherlands (2017)
- Cultural Center | Rozet | Arnhem, The Netherlands (2013)
- Cultural Center & Library | Culture House Eemhuis | Amersfoort, The Netherlands (2013)
- Museum aan de Stroom | MAS | Antwerp, Belgium (2010)
- Dutch Tax Office | Walterboscomplex | Apeldoorn, The Netherlands (2007)
- Museum and archives | Netherlands Institute for Sound and Vision | Hilversum, The Netherlands (2006)
- Shipping and Transport College Group | Rotterdam, The Netherlands (2005)
- Lake Side Housing | The Sphinxes | Huizen, The Netherlands (2003)
- Theatre & Art Centre | STUK | Leuven, Belgium (2002)
- University Building | Minnaert | Utrecht, The Netherlands (1997)

=== Current projects ===
- Gare Maritime | Brussels
- Amsterdam Museum | Amsterdam
- ZIL Factory | Moscow
- Heldentoren apartments | Knokke
- Lorentz Phase 2 | Leiden
- Ninoofse poort | Brussels
- Urban Interactive District | Amsterdam

=== Competition projects ===
- Huis van Stad en Regio | Dordrecht, Netherlands | City of Dordrecht | competition | 2020
- Louvre Collection Depot | Lévien, France | Louvre Museum | competition | 2015
- Porsche Design Tower | Frankfurt, Germany | competition | 2015
- Concert Hall, Dance Hall, Theatre, Conservatory | Spuiforum | City of The Hague | The Hague, The Netherlands | international invited competition, first prize | 2014
- Adidas World of Sports | Herzogenaurach, Germany | competition | 2014
- Museum Boijmans van Beuningen Collection Building | Rotterdam, The Netherlands | competition | 2013
- Hotel Areal InterContinental | Vienna, Austria | WertInvest | competition | 2013
- Office Building Le Cinq | Paris, France | NV Buelens | competition second prize | 2012
- Museum | Moscow, Russia | Polytechnic Museum Development Foundation | competition | 2011
- Museum | Narbonne, France | City of Narbonne | competition | 2011
- Opera & Ballet Theatre | Perm, Russia | competition second prize | 2010
- Concert Hall | Ljubljana, Slovenia | competition first prize | 2010
- Museum of European History | Brussels, Belgium | competition | 2010
- Flagship Store Valentin Yudashkin | Moscow, Russia | invited competition | 2008
- Forum for Music & Dance | Ghent, Belgium | City of Ghent | competition first prize | 2004

== Selected publications ==
- Ornament & Identity – Neutelings Riedijk 2018. ISBN 978-3-7757-4215-3
- El Croquis 159 – Neutelings Riedijk 2003–2012, Levene, R. (ed.), Madrid 2012. ISBN 978-84-88386-694
- The MAS Revealed 2007–2011, Grooten S., Heylen P., Steverlynck S., Schoten 2011. ISBN 9789085866060
- The Making of the MAS 1995–2010, Neutelings WJ., Steverlynck S., Vermeulen P., Schoten 2011. ISBN 978-90-8586-575-9
- Neutelings Riedijk Architects, Sanguigni G., Rome 2011. ISBN 978-88-7864-074-0
- Beeld en Geluid – Sound and Vision, Keuning D., Amsterdam 2007. ISBN 978-90-6369-157-8
- Aan het Werk, Neutelings WJ., Riedijk M., Rotterdam 2004. ISBN 90-6450-527-6
- At Work, Neutelings WJ., Riedijk M., Rotterdam 2004. ISBN 90-6450-508-X
- El Croquis 94 – Neutelings Riedijk 1992–1999, Levene, R. (ed.), Madrid 1999. ASIN B000QB38MA
- Minnaertgebouw Universiteit Utrecht, Neutelings WJ., Weegers Th., Rotterdam 1998. ISBN 90-6450-354-0

== Selected awards and honours ==
- Nomination Mies van der Rohe Award | for Rozet Arnhem | 2015
- Arc14 Award Best Dutch Interior Design | for Rozet Arnhem | 2014
- Best New Dutch Building of the Year Award | for Rozet Arnhem | 2014
- Heuvelink Prize 2014 | for Rozet Arnhem | 2014
- Best Library of 2013 | for Rozet Arnhem | 2013
- Belgium Steel Construction Award | for MAS Museum aan de Stroom | 2012
- AIT Award | for MAS Museum aan de Stroom | 2012
- Nomination Mies van der Rohe Award | for MAS Museum aan de Stroom | 2011
- Dutch Design Award | for MAS Museum aan de Stroom | 2011
- BNA Cube | for international oeuvre | 2010
- Nomination Mies van der Rohe Award | for Netherlands Institute for Sound and Vision | 2009
- Nomination Mies van der Rohe Award | for Dutch Tax Office | 2009
- Golden Pyramid Award | for Netherlands Institute for Sound and Vision | 2008
- Concrete Award | for Netherlands Institute for Sound and Vision | 2007
- Arie Keppler Award | for Netherlands Institute for Sound and Vision | 2007
- Nomination Mies van der Rohe Award | for Shipping and Transport College | 2006
- Belgian Building Award | for international oeuvre | 2006
- Nomination Mies van der Rohe Award | for Lake Shore housing the Sphinxes | 2005
- Award of the City of Rotterdam | Best building of the year Muller Pier Block 3 | 2004
- Award of the City of Leuven | Best building of the year Performing Arts Centre STUK | 2003
- Award of the City of Breda | Best building of the year Fire Station | 2000
- Nomination for the Rietveld Award | for Minnaert University Building Utrecht | 1999
- Rotterdam Maaskant Award | Best Young Architect under age 35 | 1991

== Selected exhibitions ==
- What Is Ornament? | Lisbon, Portugal | 2019
- Mies van der Rohe Award 2015 | Brussels, Belgium | 2015
- Models. Imagining to scale | Ghent, Belgium | 2014
- The Fantastic Library | Moscow, Russia | 2013
- Design Shanghai | Shanghai, China | 2013
- Culture:City | Berlin, Germany | Graz, Austria | 2013
- Centre Pompidou | Paris, France | 2012
- AIT Behind the Curtains | Cologne, Germany | Munich, Germany | Hamburg, Germany | 2012-13
- Mies van der Rohe Award 2009 | Essen, Germany | Madrid, Spain | Vienna, Austria | 2010
- Lucky Dutch Festival | Moscow, Russia | 2009
- Cité de l’Architecture et du Patrimoine | Paris, France | 2007 | 2012
- International Architecture Biennale Rotterdam | Rotterdam, the Netherlands | 2005 | 2009
- Global Polis | New York, USA | 2009
- Skin between texture and frame | Paris, France | 2007
- Skin and Bones | Los Angeles, USA | Tokyo, Japan | London, UK | 2006-08
- Behind Curtains | Rotterdam, the Netherlands | Beijing, China | Brussels, Belgium | Prague, Czech Republic | Ljubljana, Slovenia | 2004-13
- Beijing Architectural Biennial | 2004 | 2009
- Architectural Biennale of Venice | Venice, Italy | 1991 | 2004
- Panoramas Européens | Paris, France | 2001
- 10 Shades of Green | New York, USA | Austin, USA | Washington, USA | Houston, USA | 2000-02
- Contemporary Architecture in Flanders | Venice Biennale | Rome, Italy | Grenoble, France | 2000
