= STC Group =

International sea transport education provider

Coordinates: 51°54′6.19″N 4°27′40.57″E

The Shipping and Transport College Group (STC Group) is an international maritime transport and logistics education provider, which also offers consultancy and applied research in the field of shipping, ports, transport, logistics and port-related oil and chemical activities. The group has a number of schools and training centers worldwide and offers both master's/bachelor's degrees and vocational diplomas. The group's headquarters is located in Rotterdam, the Netherlands.

== Shipping and Transport College ==
The founding school, Shipping and Transport College, is the result of a merger of all Dutch maritime colleges in 1990. Located in Rotterdam, it is the only vocational college for shipping and logistics in the country endorsed by the Dutch Ministry of Education, Culture and Science. STC caters to all levels of education, including: preparatory vocational, senior secondary vocational, higher professional, and master's degree courses. STC also has offerings for companies and professionals, including: corporate training, consultancy services, and applied research for the shipping, port, logistics and transport industries.

The college is known for its Simulator Park, which is the largest in the world. STC teachers, trainers and lecturers always have in depth practical, experiential knowledge and are selected from the shipping and transport industry itself.

=== STC NMU ===
The Netherlands Maritime University Rotterdam (STC-NMU) is a specialised educational institute founded by the STC Group to offer a specialised 60-week Master of Science Shipping and Transport program that trains students for management positions in the shipping and transport industry.

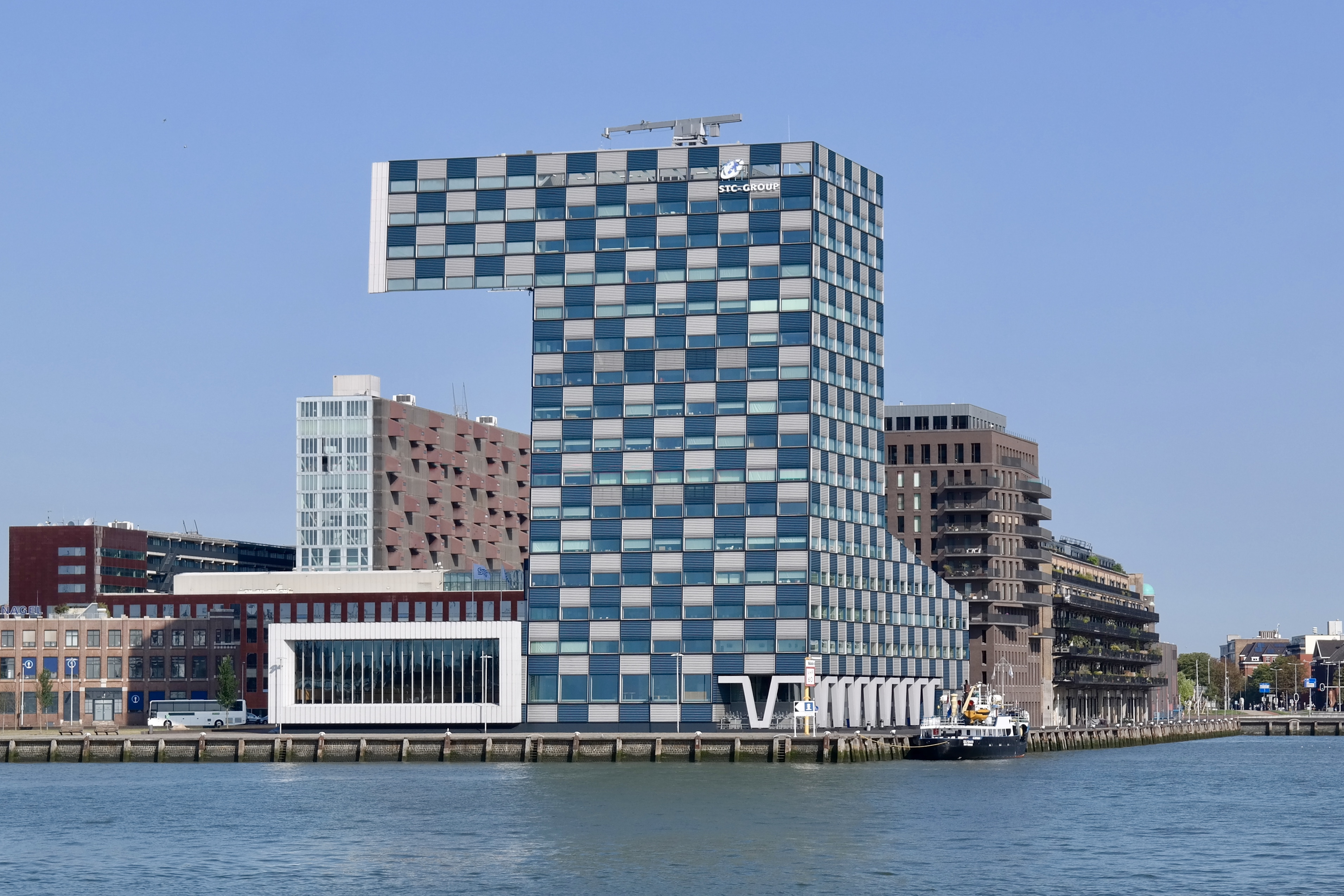
STC Building Rotterdam

=== Building ===
Since the mergers in 1990 the STC Group opened many new buildings including a new building in the Lloyd District by Neutelings Riedijk Architects, a historical and contemporary port area in the center of Rotterdam. This building has all the simulators and training materials required for secondary and higher shipping and transport education. The building is a Rotterdam architectural landmark and was opened by King Willem-Alexander of the Netherlands.

=== Facilities ===
Practical facilities include modern labs, workshops, offshore centre, training vessels, training centres, training factories and process simulators. For over 3 decades, “De Loopplank”, a division of the STC Group, has provided supervised accommodation for various participants from the STC Group. At the Lloydstraat and Waalhaven campuses, there are sports facilities and fitness centres.

=== Training ships ===
The institute operates several training vessels to support practical education. The "Ab Initio" serves inland shipping students, while the "Stormmeeuw," a former customs vessel, is utilized by merchant shipping students.

In addition to its own vessels, STC collaborates with the sailing vessel "Eendracht," offering students a week-long sailing experience to gain hands-on insight into the maritime profession.

== International schools ==
The STC Group has several schools and facilities in Vietnam (STC-VIETNAM), Korea (STC-Korea), Brazil (STC-Brazil), and Oman (IMCO-Oman).

=== Projects ===
The STC Group is also running a vast array of projects in the Bahamas, Benin, Cameroon, China, Egypt, Ethiopia, Indonesia, Malaysia, Thailand, Tonga, and Vietnam.

== Bibliography ==
- (in Dutch) STC Informatieboekje MBO (STC, Rotterdam, 2011).
