= Julio Vilamajó =

Uruguayan architect

- Born: Julio Agustín Vilamajó Echaniz; July 1, 1894; Montevideo, Uruguay
- Died: April 12, 1948 (aged 53); Montevideo, Uruguay
- Occupation: Architect
- Buildings: Vilamajó House Museum, Montevideo

Julio Vilamajó Echaniz (July 1, 1894 – April 12, 1948) was one of the best known Uruguayan architects. He was a member of the Board of Design Consultants for the construction of the United Nations headquarters together with Le Corbusier and Oscar Niemeyer.

== Childhood ==
Vilamajó was born in Montevideo, Uruguay. He was the son of Ramón Vilamajó, a merchant born in Perpignan, France, and Eustaquia Echaniz, a native from San Sebastián in Spain. He was a pupil at School No. 24 in Montevideo from 1901 to 1903 and finished primary school at Colegio Sagrada Familia between 1904 and 1906. His grandfather, Josef Agustín Echaniz, was also an architect.

== 1910–1924 Education, early works and travel ==
Vilamajó was only 20 years of age when he graduated from the Faculty of Architecture in 1915. His education was based on the classical guidelines of the École des Beaux-Arts, during a period of transition to modern architecture. He was an outstanding student who excelled in the area of design. Starting in 1916, he decorated the auditorium of the Ateneo in Montevideo (with Horacio Azzarini), and refurbished José Enrique Rodó high school and several houses. He also received second prize in the competition for the headquarters of the Banco de la República Oriental del Uruguay and the Felipe Sanguinetti school building. These early works are characterized by an eclectic style, using references to the past mixed with modern architectural concepts, which became a trademark for Vilamajó's work.

In 1917, Vilamajó began to teach at the School of Architecture and was appointed adjunct professor of Architectural Design, after a competitive selection process. In 1920, he applied for the annual competition organized by the School of Architecture intended to increase the training of its graduates abroad. His project, "Palace to serve as headquarters of the League of Nations" won the Grand Prize, which provided the funding for study abroad.

In July 1921, Vilamajó traveled to Europe in the midst of its World War I reconstruction and remained there until December, 1924. He visited many European countries such as Netherlands, Italy and Greece, but spent most of his time moving between France and Spain, working for a construction company in Paris. The company specialized in the mass-production of housing. Attracted by the Hispano-Arabic culture, he extended his stay and traveled to Andalusia, Algeria, Morocco and Tunisia. He visited the Ramblas (promenade) and the Montjuic and studied the work of Gaudí in Barcelona. In Granada, he visited Alhambra and Generalife. He then traveled to Italy and Greece.

== 1924–1928 ==
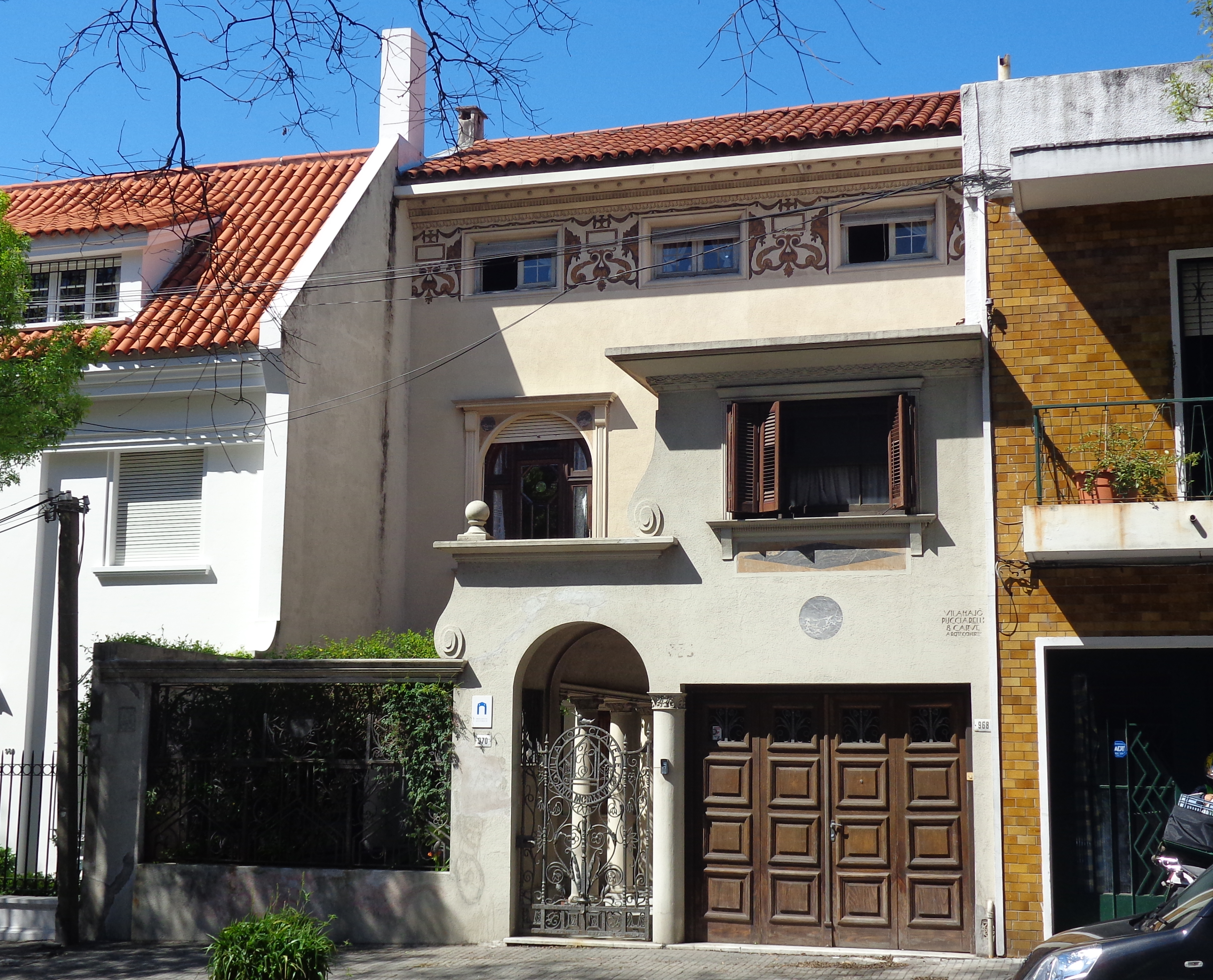
Casa de Felipe Yriart

The Vilamajó, Pucciarelli & Carve Company, founded in 1926, built more than twenty homes in the city of Montevideo. The meticulous attention paid to details in these houses was unusual. Some of the highlights of this work are the Palacio Santa Lucia, the Giacomo Pucciarelli apartment blocks, the Augusto Pérsico and the Felipe Yriart residence. These buildings demonstrate a clear, almost exclusive Iberian influence.

== 1929–1936 ==
In 1929, Vilamajó resumed his position as adjunct professor at the School of Architecture. In July 1929, he won first prize at the competition for the Club Atlético Peñarol Stadium and, a month later, he won first prize at the competition for building the BROU - General Flores branch. In October, he was awarded first prize for the Centro de Almaceneros Minoristas project, a complex of apartments, shops, offices and a movie theater.

In 1930, he married Mercedes Pulido, who had been his girlfriend since his teenage years. He built their own home in Montevideo; it is now the Vilamajó House Museum. This was a time of transition when Vilamajó began to move from a historical to a humanist standpoint, seeking to balance logic and rationality in his construction projects.

In 1931, Vilamajó and a coatings manufacturer named Debernardis, became concerned about the housing demand, and created and patented a building system (the Vibro-Econo) which comprised pieces of concrete manufactured in series.

== 1936–1948 ==
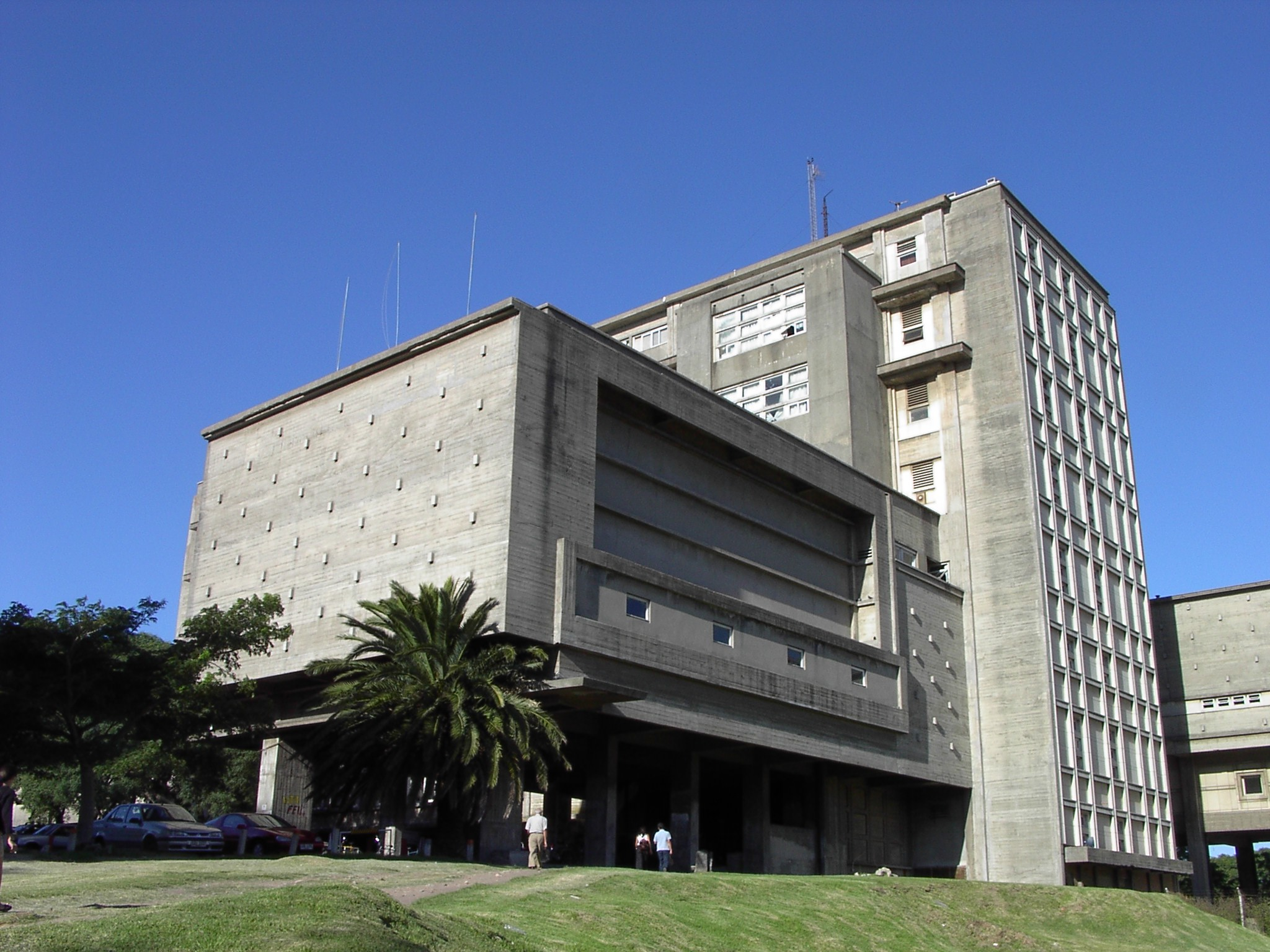
School of Engineering facade

The most representative works of this period are the Monument to the Argentine-Uruguayan Confraternity of Buenos Aires, the School of Engineering, Mesón de las Cañas, Ventorrilo de la Buena Vista, and El Mirador hotel in Colonia.

In 1936, Vilamajó won first prize, along with sculptor Antonio Pena, for the Monument to the Peoples' Confraternity project in Buenos Aires. He began construction of the School of Engineering building in the same year. In 1959, Richard Neutra visited the country. A group or architects took him to see the city and nothing seemed to attract him, until he stopped in front of the School of Engineering. He asked who was the author of the work and commented in praise: "it is the work of a master, the Japanese are just now discovering concrete."

In 1942, Vilamajó began teaching project subjects for 4th and 5th years at the School of Architecture, after the demise of long-time teacher, Joseph Carré. In 1944, he was commissioned to create the Annex Storage to Confitería La Americana. In 1945, Vilamajó was appointed director of the urban development plan for Villa Serrana. In 1946, he built Ventorrillo de la Buena Vista, and in 1947, he began the construction of Mesón de las Cañas.

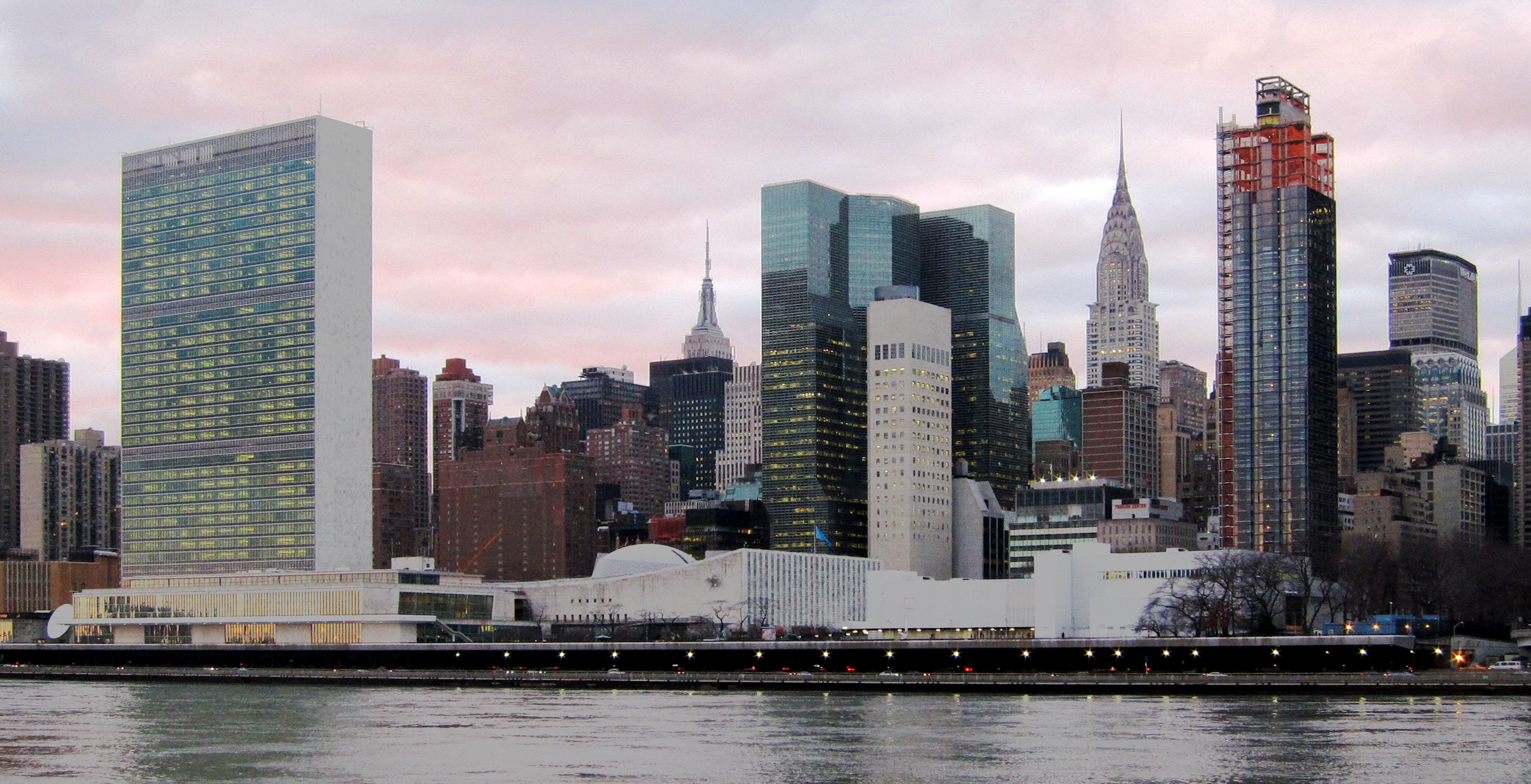
United Nations Headquarters in New York City, view from Roosevelt Island

In 1947, Vilamajó was selected as an external consultant for the building of the United Nations headquarters. He was part of an international group of architectural consultants chosen by the project coordinator, the American architect Wallace Harrison. Le Corbusier was also part of this group, while the Brazilian, Oscar Niemeyer and Julio Vilamajó were the only Latin Americans. Le Corbusier insisted for the rest of his life that his proposal, called "scheme 23A”, had been the design chosen, but his plan was highly modified to incorporate parts of the design submitted by Niemeyer, specifically, altering Le Corbusier's one-building design into a complex of buildings. The rivalry and tension that was generated by this New York assignment aggravated his hypertension, and he was quite ill when the consulting teamwork was done and he came back to Uruguay. Wallace Harrison, the project coordinator, acknowledged Vilamajó's work on the project in a note to Vilamajó in which he said: "I can't let you leave the country without first telling you how much I personally appreciate the sacrifice you did at the expense of your health, by staying until completing the United Nation studies. Your help on this project has been beyond value and it's been a great pleasure working in close contact with you these few last months." After the consulting team's last work session, Harrison had to choose an advisory team to monitor progress. He selected G. A. Soilleux (Australia), M. Nowicki (Poland), J. Havlicek ( Czechoslovakia), P. Noskov (U.S.S.R.), and Vilamajó from the original group of consultants and advisors. Vilamajó kept working from Montevideo, despite his health issues, until he died in 1948.
