= Flint (theatre) =

Theatre in Amersfoort, Netherlands

Coordinates: 52°9′35.5″N 5°23′34″E

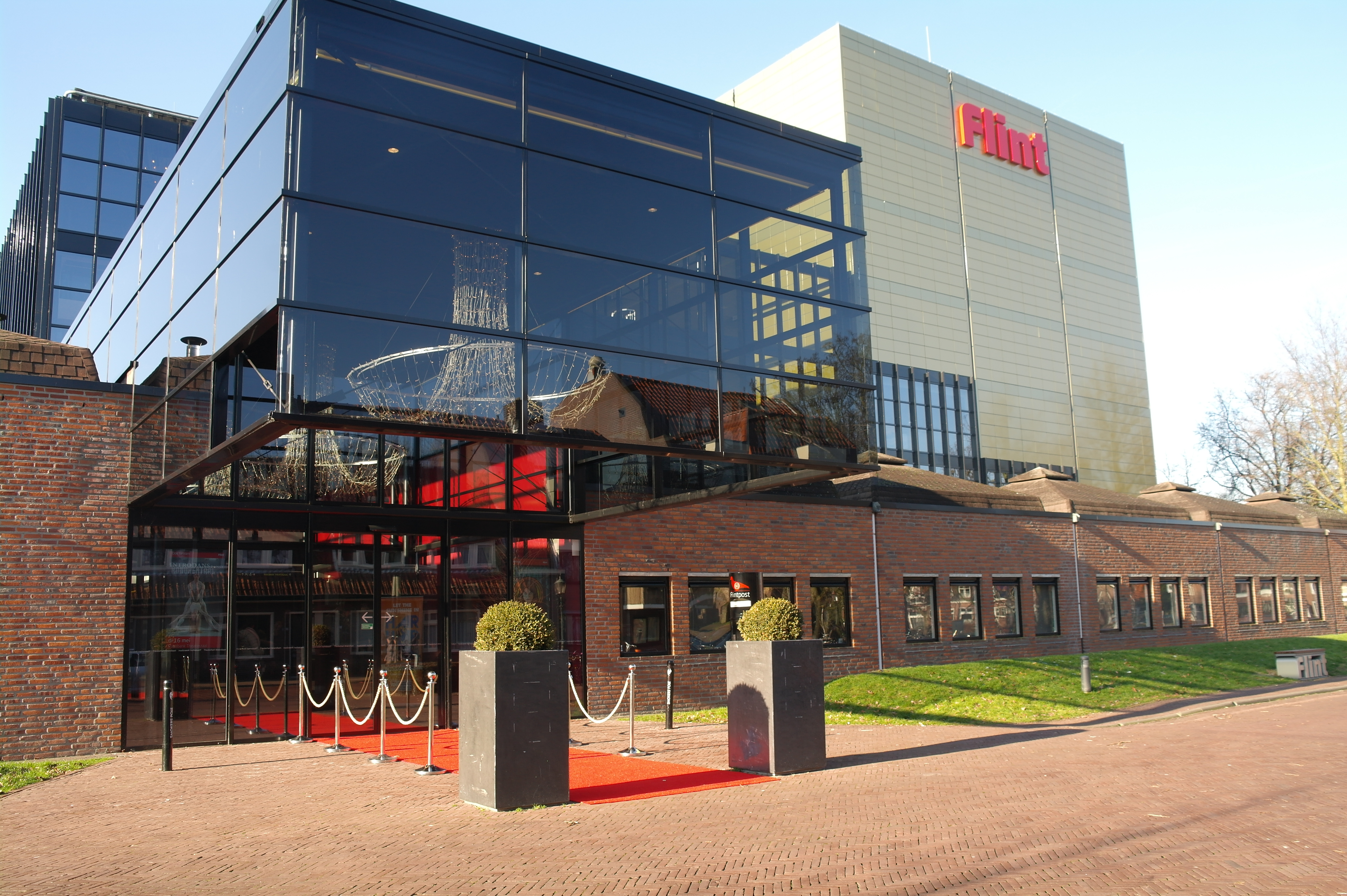

Flint, formerly De Flint, is a theatre in the centre of Amersfoort, Netherlands built in 1977. It was designed by Onno Greiner. The Flint programme includes play, musicals, cabaret and performances for children.

On 25 November 1990 the theatre burned down. There were signs of burglary. The damage was 10 million Dutch guilder. The theatre was rebuilt on the same location, and reopened in 1994.

== People ==
Ank Marx (1962/1963 – June 2020) was for 25 years the theatre programmer of Flint. She was beloved by actors and actresses, including Youp van 't Hek. She was an important reason for many artists to come and perform at Flint. Marx studied musicology. She started working in 1990 for Amersfoortse Culturele Raad (AMC), just after the fire. At the ACR she was responsible for programming classical music in the St. Aegtenkapel (St. Aegten chapel). In 1996 she joined Flint, which took over the programming in the chapel. Over the years she became responsible for the entire programming. She ensured a successful relationship between theatre, cabaret, music, opera and other genres. After a brief illness, Marx died in June 2020, aged 57.
