= Netherlands Institute for Sound and Vision =

Audiovisual archive and museum in Hilversum

- Nederlands Instituut voor Beeld en Geluid

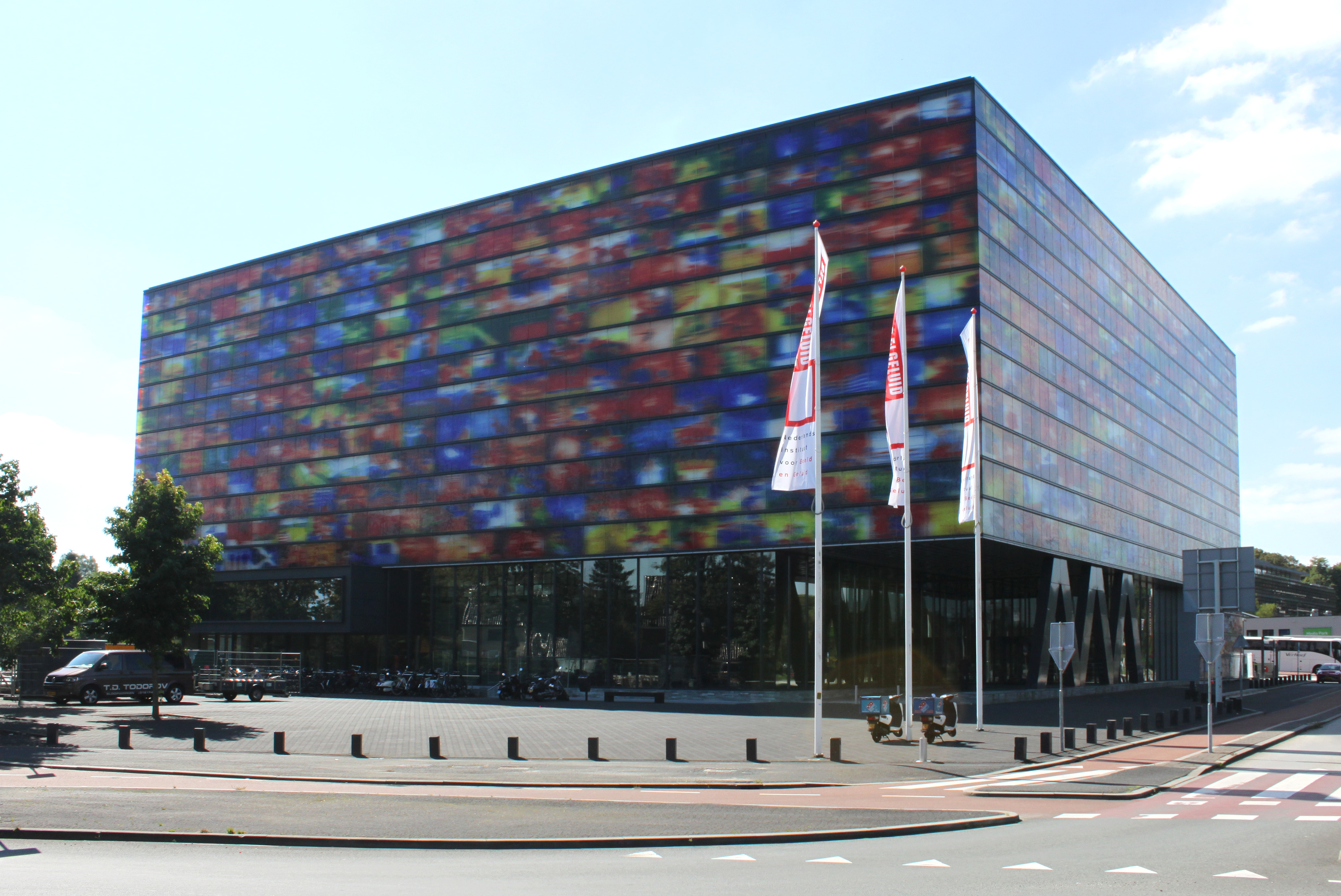
- The institute in 2014
- Established: 1997 (as NAA)
- Location: Media Park; Hilversum, North Holland, Netherlands
- Coordinates: 52°14′7″N 5°10′23″E
- Website: www.beeldengeluid.nl

The Dutch Institute for Sound and Vision (Dutch: Nederlands Instituut voor Beeld en Geluid, NIBG), founded as Dutch Audiovisual Archive (Dutch: Nederlands Audiovisueel Archief, NAA) is an archive centre and museum located in Hilversum, Netherlands. It is the business archive of the Dutch public broadcasting system as well as a cultural heritage institute for researchers and the public. The Museum voor Communicatie merged with the institute in 2019, rebadged as Beeld en Geluid Den Haag, and in 2022 Muziekweb, previously based in Rotterdam, also merged with the NIBG.

The NIBG also hosts the B&G Wiki, which contains information about all aspects of the screen and recording industries contained in the image and sound collection, as well as the audiovisual media history of the Netherlands.

== History ==
The history of the institute goes back to 1919, with the foundation of the one of its precursors, Nederlandsch Centraal Filmarchief. The institute was founded in 1997 as the Dutch Audiovisual Archive (Dutch: Nederlands Audiovisueel Archief, NAA), and adopting its current name in 2002.

In 2019, the Museum voor Communicatie, established in The Hague in 1929, merged with Sound and Vision. The museum has been renamed as Beeld en Geluid Den Haag.

On 1 January 2022, Muziekweb was merged into Sound and Vision. Muziekweb was previously affiliated with the Central Library of Rotterdam. It has been described as "Europe's largest music collection".

== Description ==
The institute collects, preserves, and provides access to most of the Dutch audiovisual collection. As of 2014, the institute has more than 750,000 hours of material dating back to 1898, making it one of the largest audiovisual archives in Europe. It is also the business archive of the national broadcasting corporations, a cultural heritage institute (providing access to students and the general public) and a museum for its visitors. The digital television production workflow and massive digitization efforts break grounds for new services.

== Research projects ==
Sound and Vision is an experienced partner in European-funded research projects. These include or have included: P2P-Fusion, MultiMatch, PrestoSpace, VIDI-Video, LiWA Living Web Archives (Research Project), Communia, Video Active (European Research Project) and the streaming mobile app Radio Garden, which gives listeners access to radio stations worldwide.

== B&G Wiki ==
The Dutch Institute for Sound and Vision hosts the B&G Wiki, which contains information about all aspects of the screen and recording industries contained in the image and sound collection, as well as the audiovisual media history of the Netherlands. The articles are written by staff and designated experts. The editorial team of Netherlands Institute for Sound and Vision oversees the quality of contributions submitted by users, creates basic pages, and also ensures that additional references are added to as many relevant topics as possible.

== See also ==
- List of music museums
