= Willy Lages =

German intelligence officer and convicted war criminal

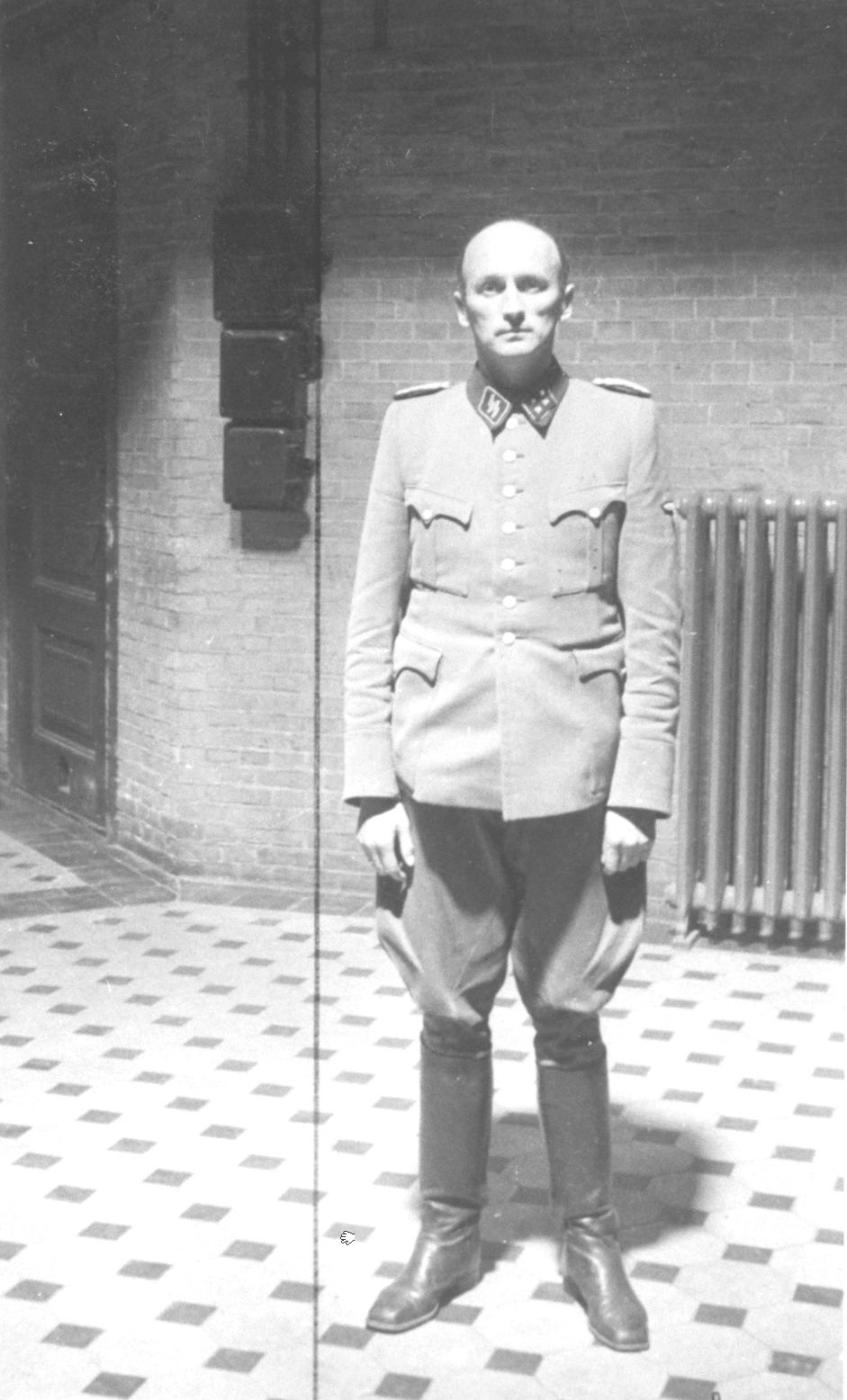
- Born: 5 October 1901; Braunschweig, German Empire
- Died: 2 April 1971 (aged 69); Braunlage, Lower Saxony, West Germany
- Military career
- Allegiance: Nazi Germany

Willy Paul Franz Lages (5 October 1901 – 2 April 1971) was the German chief of the Sicherheitsdienst in Amsterdam during the Second World War. From March 1941 he led the Central Agency for Jewish Emigration in Amsterdam. As such, he was complicit in the mass deportations of 70,000 Dutch Jews to the concentration camps in Germany and occupied Poland. Lages also directly ordered multiple executions, including that of Hannie Schaft.

After the war, a court in the Netherlands found Lages guilty of war crimes and sentenced him to death in 1949. His sentence was confirmed in 1950. However, Lages was never executed since Queen Juliana, who had become increasingly reluctant to authorize death sentences, refused to sign his death warrant. This was opposed by the Dutch cabinet, and there were large public protests against the possibility of amnesty for Lages. However, in 1952, Lages's sentence was commuted to life in prison.

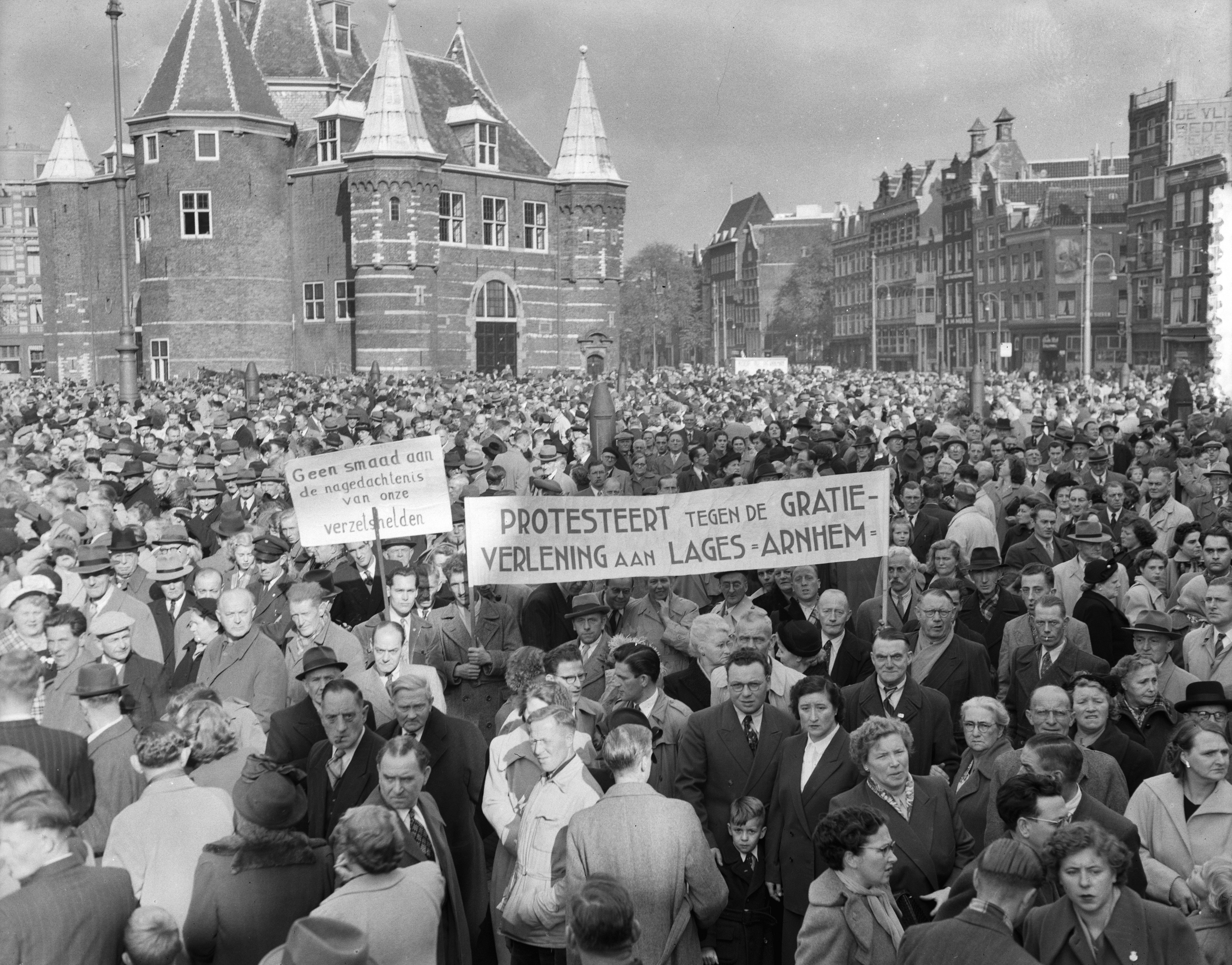
Demonstration against possible amnesty for Lages (1952)

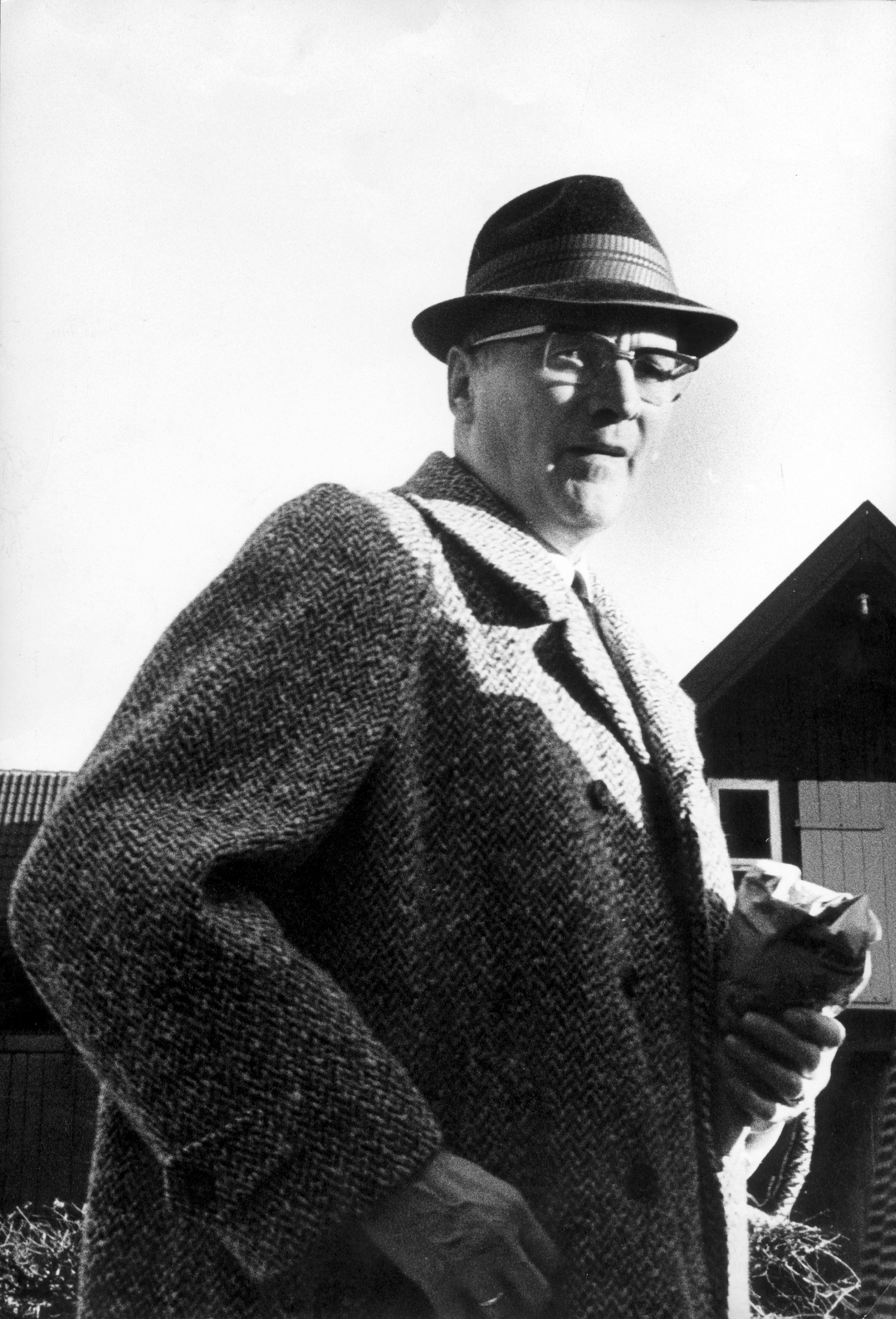
Willy Lages in 1969 in West-Germany after his sentence interruption

Lages was imprisoned in Breda, along with Joseph Kotalla, Ferdinand aus der Fünten and Franz Fischer (the Breda Four group). In 1966, he was released from prison for humanitarian reasons on the grounds of his failing health. The decision taken by the Minister of Justice Ivo Samkalden provoked a public outcry. Lages received medical treatment in Germany after which he lived for another five years in Braunlage (Harz).
