= Breda Four =

Last four German WWII war criminals imprisoned in Breda, the Netherlands

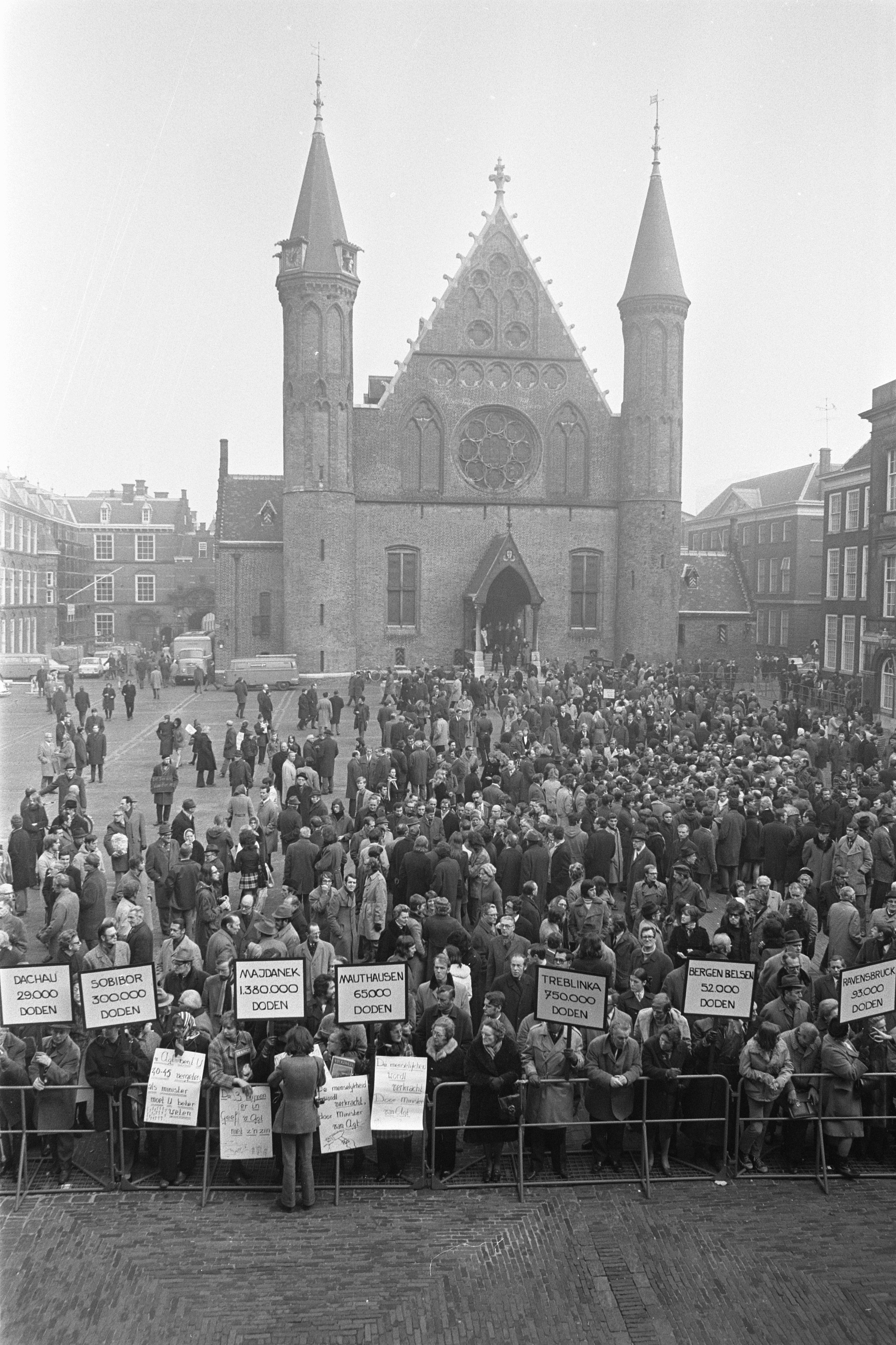
Protests at the Binnenhof in 1972 against the possible release of The Breda Three

The Breda Four (Breda Three after 1966 and Breda Two after 1979), were the last four continuously imprisoned German war criminals in the Netherlands following the Second World War. The group consisted of Willy Lages, Joseph Kotalla, Ferdinand aus der Fünten, and Franz Fischer. From the 1950s, they were incarcerated in the dome prison in Breda, which inspired their collective name.

Lages, Aus der Fünten and Fischer played a key role in the deportations of Jews, while Kotalla was deputy head of Kamp Amersfoort. The Breda Four were initially sentenced to death, but in 1951–1952 were among those whose sentences were commuted to life imprisonment. However, they were the only German war criminals in the Netherlands not released before 1961.

In the following decades, pushes were made to release them. The West German government and other organisations lobbied for them. The clemency requests coincided with increasing awareness of World War II and the psychological impact on victims in the Netherlands. Ministers of Justice decided against releasing them, after proposals for release were met with public protests and emotional debates in parliament. This reached a peak in 1972.

Lages was released on sick leave in 1966 and died five years later in Germany. Kotalla died in prison in 1979. In 1987, Aus der Fünten and Fischer became the last German war criminals in Europe who had been continuously imprisoned since 1945. They were given clemency on 27 January 1989 and died the same year.

== Crimes and sentencing ==
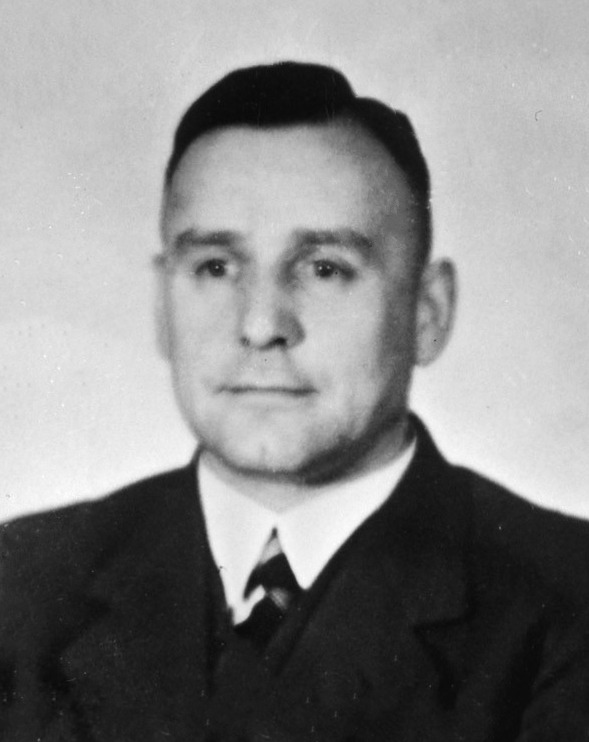
Franz Fischer

As part of the Special Jurisdiction, the Breda Four were among the 240–242 Germans tried for war crimes and crimes against humanity in the Netherlands after the Second World War. Eighteen Germans, including the Breda Four, were sentenced to the death penalty, which had been reintroduced for the Special Jurisdiction. (Note: Four of them were convicted in absentia and never apprehended)

=== Franz Fischer ===
Franz Fischer (born 1901) was transferred to the Referat IV-B4 in The Hague in November 1940. Although Wilhelm Zoepf was the head, Fischer was in practice in daily charge of the deportation of 13,000 Jews and the tracking down of Jews in hiding. He was spared the death penalty and instead received a life sentence on 17 March 1949, after the judge ruled that his personality disorder diminished his responsibility and that his antisemitic beliefs stemmed from prolonged exposure to propaganda. This was overturned in cassation on 12 July 1950, when he was sentenced to death.

=== Willy Lages ===
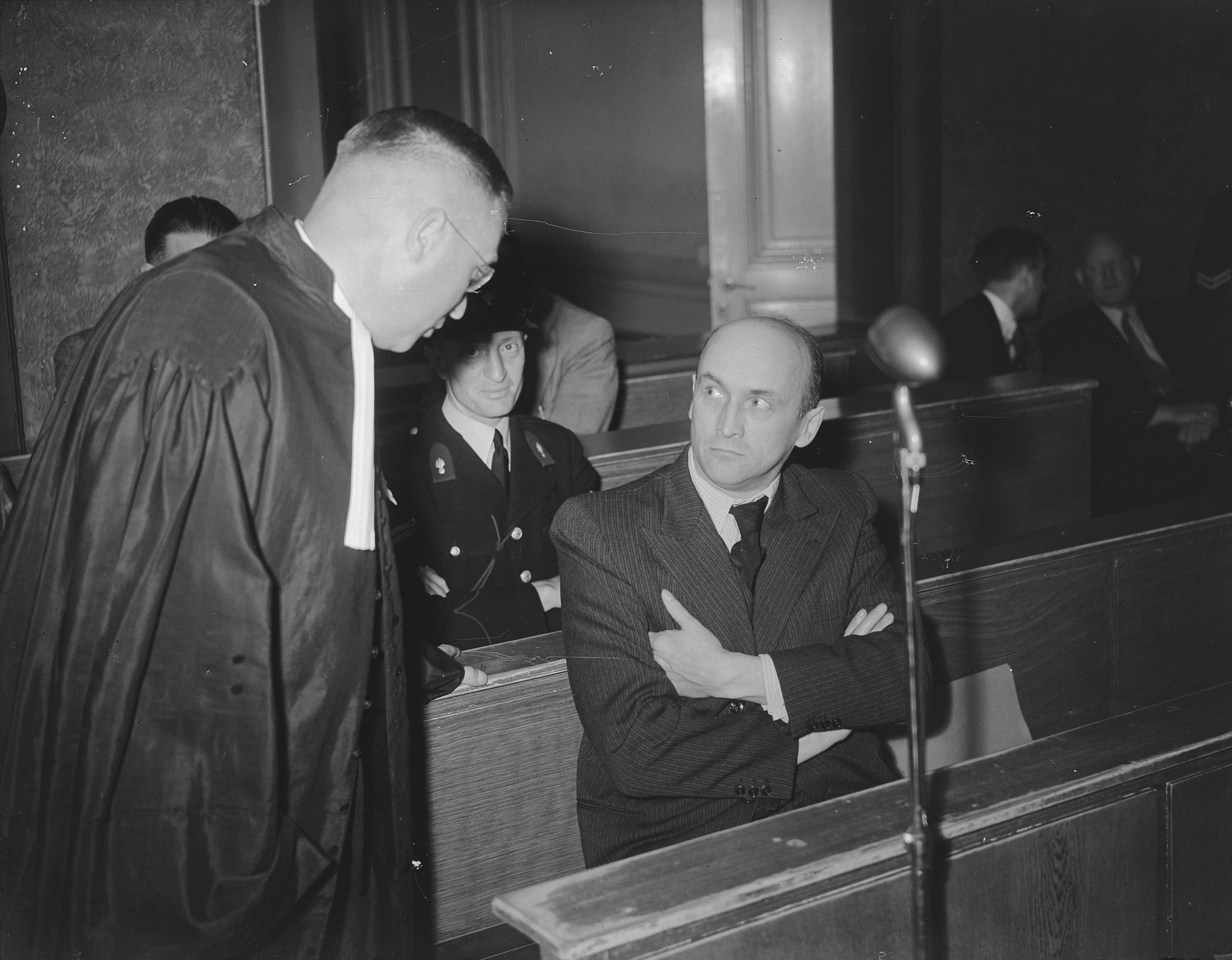
Willy Lages with his lawyer at his trial on 19 July 1949

Willy Lages (born 1901) became head of the Amsterdam office of the Sicherheitspolizei and the Sicherheitsdienst in Amsterdam after the February strike in 1941, as well as head of the Central Agency for Jewish Emigration in Amsterdam. He was responsible for anti-Jewish measures, including roundups and deportations of 70,000 Jews. He was involved in executions, including of Hannie Schaft and within Operation Silbertanne. He was sentenced to death on 20 September 1949, which was upheld in cassation on 12 July 1950.

=== Ferdinand aus der Fünten ===
Ferdinand aus der Fünten (born 1909) joined the Central Agency for Jewish Emigration in Amsterdam in September 1941. He eventually became deputy chief under Lages, through which he took daily charge of the deportations in Amsterdam. He was also involved in the clearance of various institutions, including Het Apeldoornsche Bosch. The court initially sentenced him to life in prison in December 1949, but this was overturned in cassation and he was sentenced to death on 12 July 1950.

=== Joseph Kotalla ===
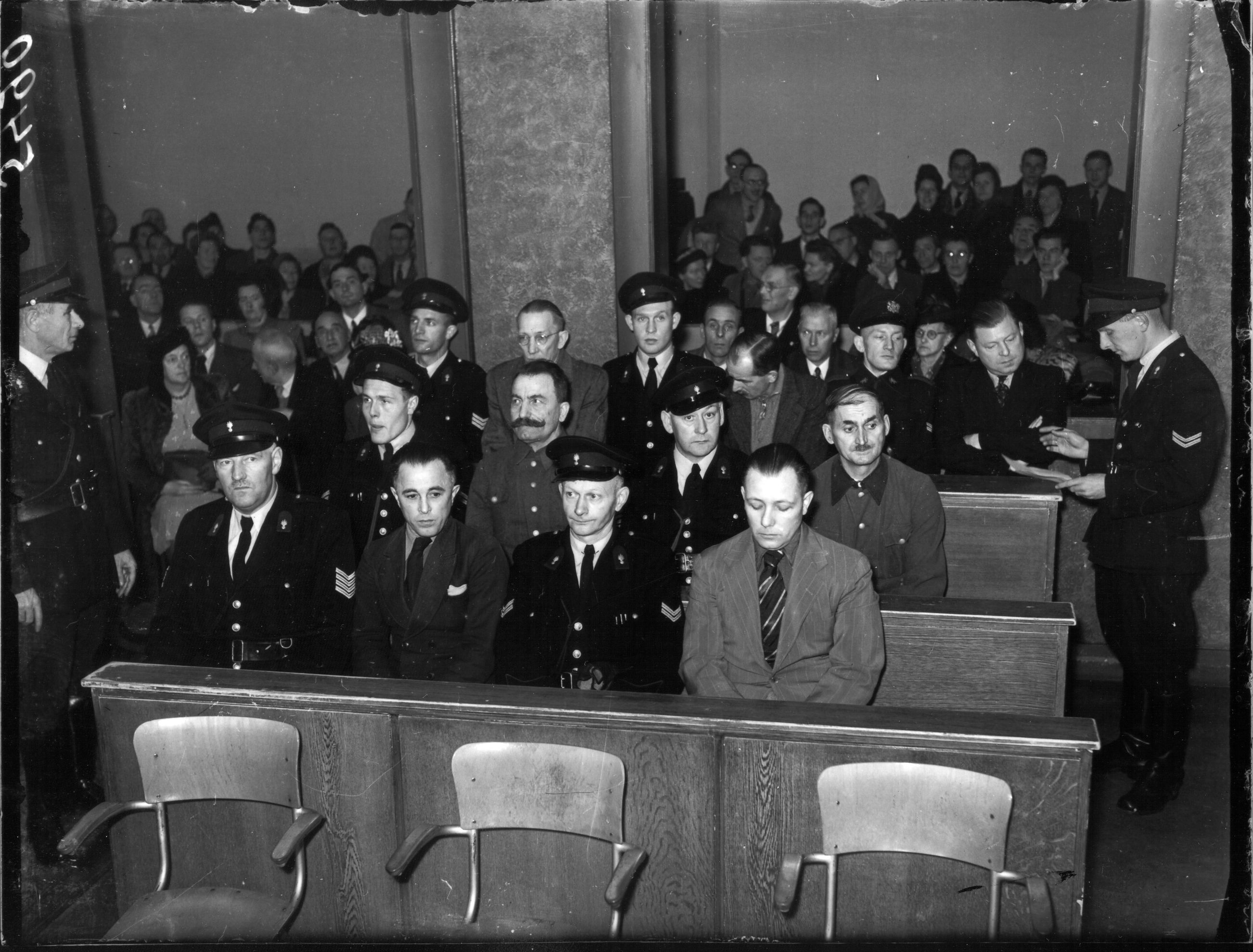
Joseph Kotalla (second from the left in the front row) at his trial on 16 November 1948

Joseph Kotalla (born 1908) was appointed as a guard in the Police Prison in Scheveningen in February 1941, where he was considered to be one of the worst. In September 1941, he was moved to Kamp Amersfoort as punishment for mishandling a prisoner in a cell. Nevertheless, Kotalla became head of administration and de facto deputy commander in early 1943. His harsh and violent treatment of prisoners earned him the nickname "Executioner of Amersfoort". He was also involved in 78 executions. (Note: Because they overlooked a victim, he was only charged and convicted for 77.) He was sentenced to death both at the initial trial and in cassation.

== Commutation to life imprisonment (1951–1952) ==
Despite public support for the death penalty, the Schermerhorn–Drees cabinet feared that too many executions would negatively impact society. In February 1946, the cabinet adopted secret guidelines for clemency. In January 1947, Minister of Justice Johannes Henricus van Maarseveen (KVP) included the most serious German war criminals as a category eligible for execution. The clemency policy faced criticism from the judicial branch, Queen Wilhelmina – who temporarily refused to approve clemencies in 1947 – and various parties in parliament.

=== German support ===
Meanwhile in West Germany, a lobby started for war criminals, which were euphemistically called 'prisoners of war'. This aid was started by the churches, in the case of the Breda Four primarily the Protestant church. Organisations linked to the churches provided legal aid, supported by government subsidies since 1948. In particular, president of the Evangelical Church of the Palatinate Hans Stempel was active, visiting the prisoners at Christmas 1951 and representing their interest ever since. In 1952, he became a board member of the Stille Hilfe. In March 1952, chair of the Evangelical Church in Germany, Otto Dibelius, protested in a letter to prime minister Willem Drees against the death sentences and asked for commutation to life in prison.

In 1949, the West German government formed the Central Legal Protection Office to coordinate the legal aid to German prisoners abroad. The West German government tried to prevent the execution of the death penalty. On 25 March 1950, German Chancellor Konrad Adenauer (CDU) asked the chairman of the Allied High Commission, André François-Poncet, to request that the Dutch government refrain from carrying out the death sentences. Through diplomatic channels, the West German government would continue in the next decades to bring up the release of the German war criminals.

=== Fischer and Aus der Fünten ===
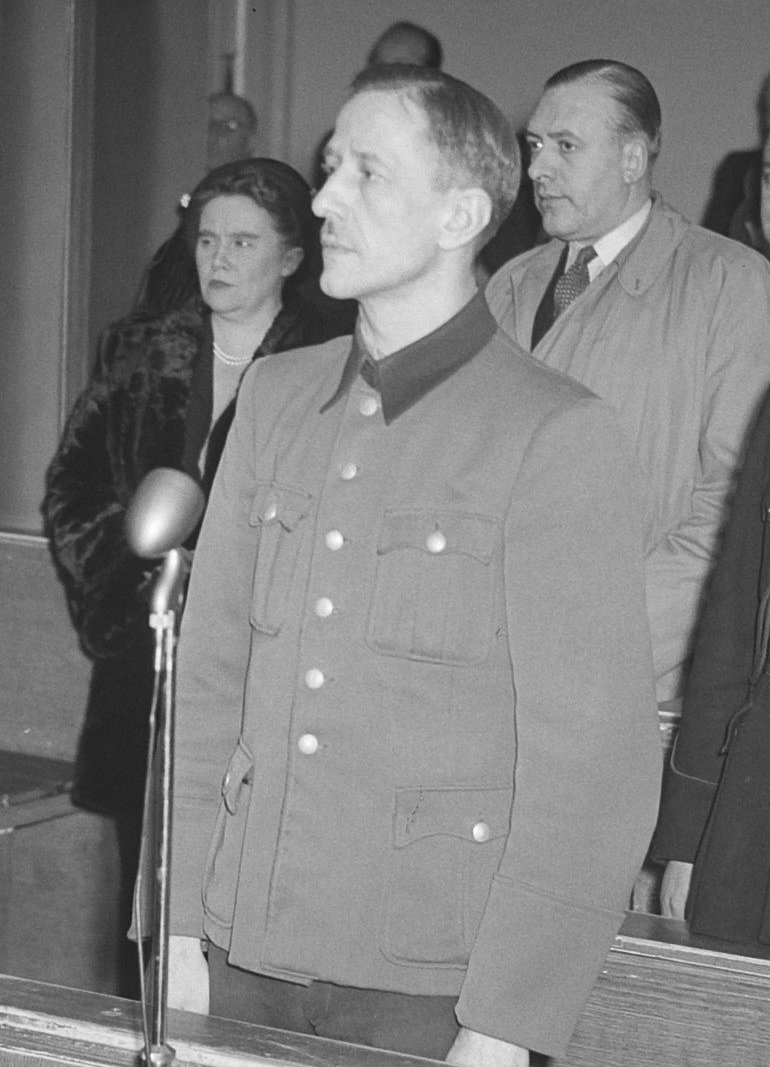
Ferdinand aus der Fünten at his trial on 13 December 1949

In 1948, Juliana ascended to the throne as the new queen. She held conscientious objections to the death penalty and refused to deny some clemency requests. Minister of Justice Teun Struycken (KVP) reached a compromise with Juliana. The death penalty would be carried out only if both the initial trial and the cassation resulted in a death sentence. Consequently, the sentences of Aus der Fünten and Fischer were commuted to life imprisonment in January 1951, while Julius Herdtmann was executed in exchange.

The commutation sparked indignation, particularly among the former Dutch resistance and Jewish organisations. On 22 May 1951, communist parliamentarian Benno Stokvis interpellated Struycken's successor, Hendrik Mulderije (CHU), regarding the clemency policy. Stokvis, along with the Anti-Revolutionary Party (ARP) and the CHU, criticised the policy. A significant majority, led by KVP and Labour Party (PvdA), opposed a motion tabled by Stokvis to publish the clemency guidelines. However, a majority supported a motion tabled by Leen Donker (PvdA), expressing concern about the potential conversion of life sentences into temporary ones.

=== Kotalla ===
During Kotalla's trial, the question arose whether he had diminished responsibility. After his trials, he was diagnosed with obsessive-compulsive disorder as a result of brain damage suffered at the age of nine. As a result, Mulderije reduced Kotalla's sentence to life imprisonment in December 1951 due to diminished responsibility.

=== Lages ===
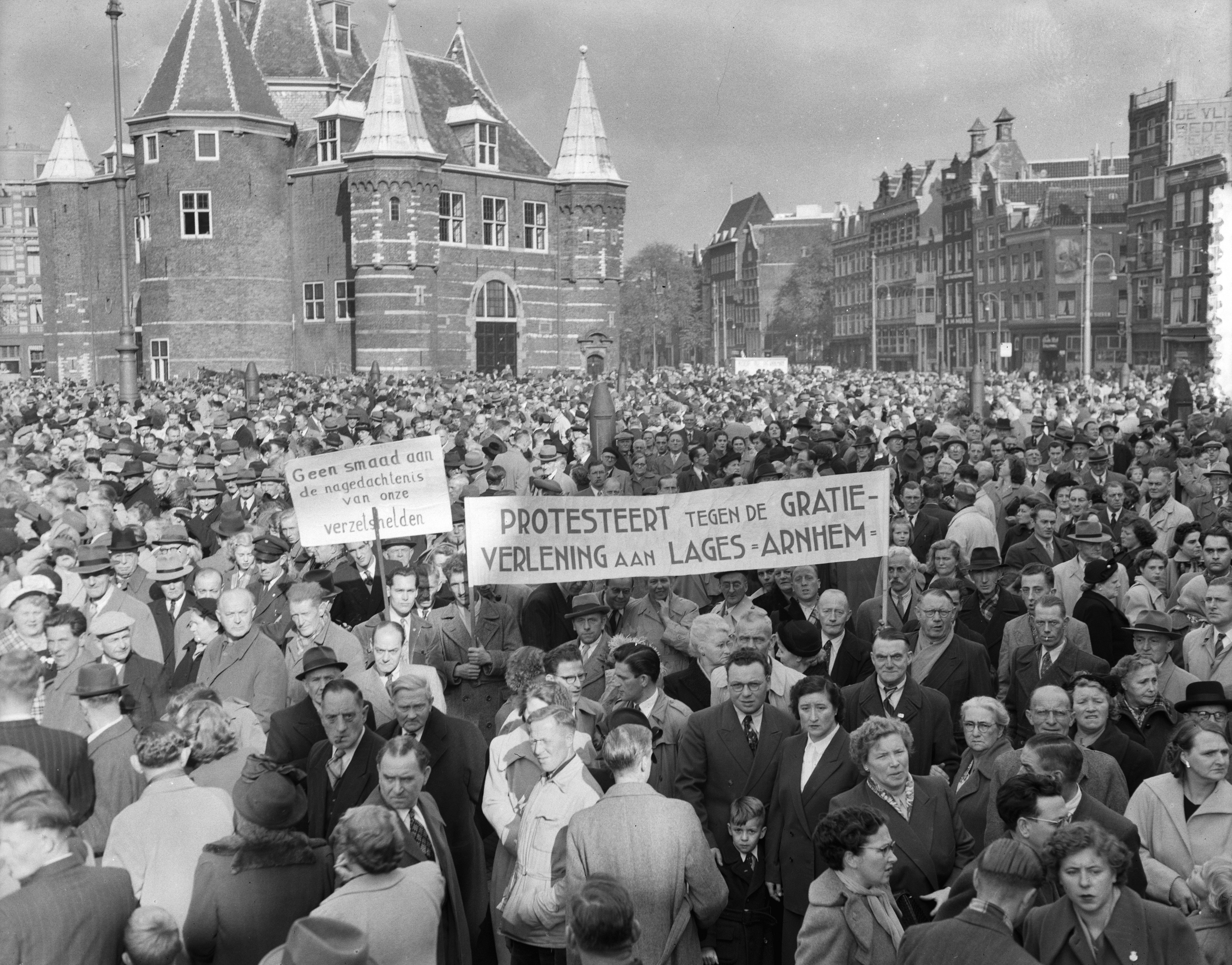
Protest on 12 October 1952 at the Nieuwmarkt in Amsterdam against clemency for Lages

Lages had been sentenced in cassation in July 1950, after which he directly requested clemency. Both courts opposed clemency, but it took the Special Court of Cassation until September 1951 to reach this conclusion. The delay was attributed to the head prosecutor delaying the processing of the request and using Lages for his investigation into abuses in camps for political detainees. Juliana also opposed his execution, while Mulderije refused to approve the clemency, both threatening to resign. Because neither gave in, a decision was postponed until after the 25 June 1952 election. In the new second Drees cabinet, Donker became minister of Justice.

The long time between his sentence and the execution became the main reason for Donker to commute Lages' sentence to life imprisonment on 29 September 1952. The decision to commute Lages' sentence sparked social unrest, with a protest on 12 October 1952 in Amsterdam involving 15,000 to 20,000 demonstrators opposing the commutation. Donker made the reservation in parliament that, as far as he was concerned, there would be no question of a second commutation in this exceptional category. He also said that in his opinion ministerial accountability applied to clemency decisions. This meant that such a decision would be influenced by parliament and thus society.

== The last four (1960–1965) ==
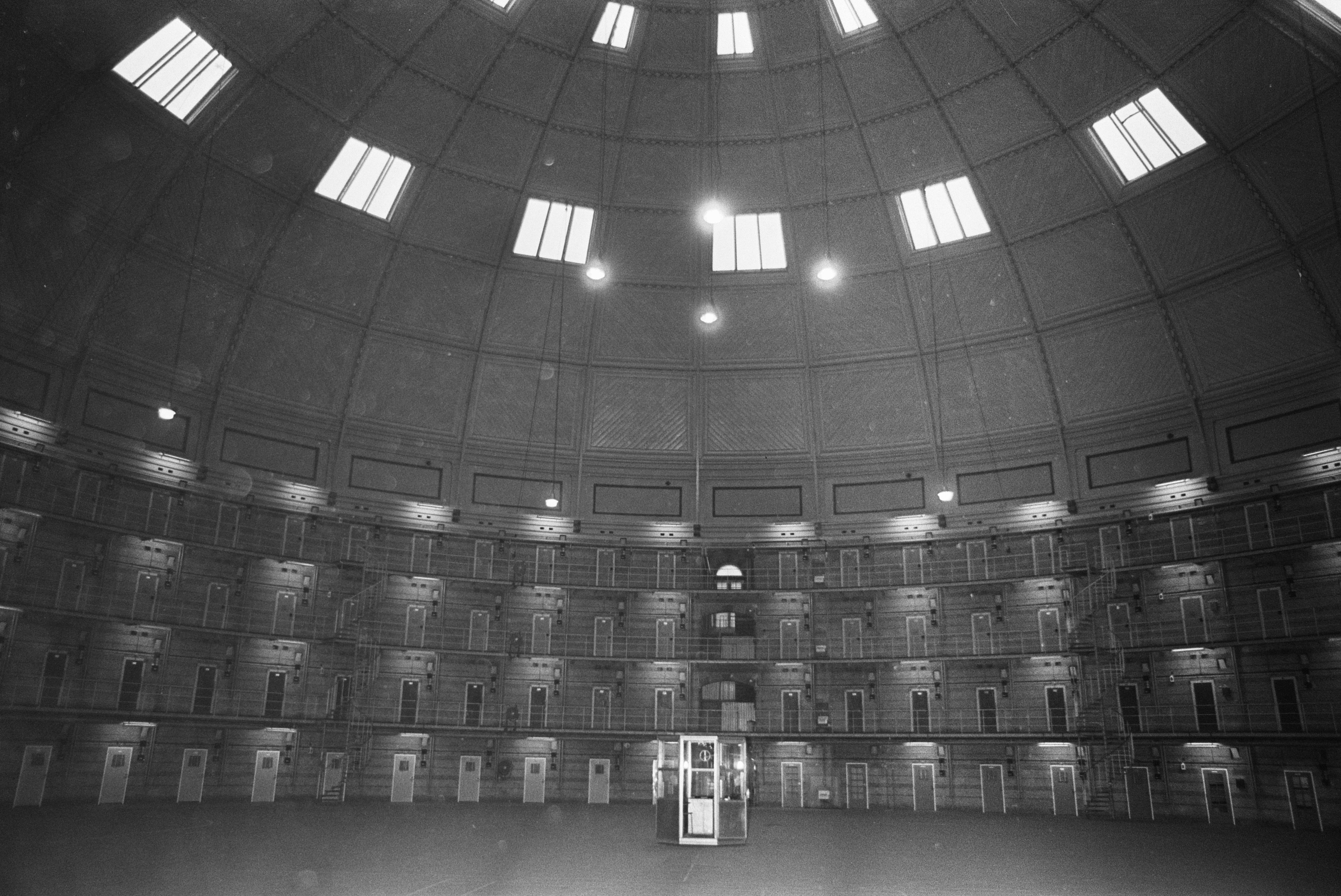
The Koepelgevangenis where the Aus der Fünten, Kotalla and Fischer since 1952 and Lages since 1955 were held (photo in 1967)

Since the introduction of the Criminal Code in 1886, a life sentence in the Netherlands had never not been commuted (generally after 15–17 years). Former Minister Struycken later stated that he expected the commuted death sentence to mean a maximum of 20 years in prison. In addition, the Dutch government wanted to leave the war behind through clemency, amongst others to avoid controversial debates about Dutch collaboration. This led to the release of the last German war criminals except for the Breda Four in 1961. This included the five other German prisoners initially sentenced to death, (Note: These were Johann Friedrich Stöver, Friedrich Bellmer, Bernard Georg Haase, Johannes Wilhelm Hoffmann and Ferdinand Frankenstein) who were released between December 1958 and May 1960 in relative silence.

There were a few reasons why the Breda Four were not released. Their cases had stirred the public opinion since directly after the war, and their first commutation had already led to public outcry and a parliamentary resolution against a further commutation. The public interest in the Second World War increased in the early 1960s, with the Eichmann trial (1961), the release of Jacques Pressers book Ashes in the Wind: The Destruction of Dutch Jewry (1965) and the broadcasting of Loe de Jongs television series De bezetting (The occupation, 1960–1965).

=== Unsuccessful requests ===
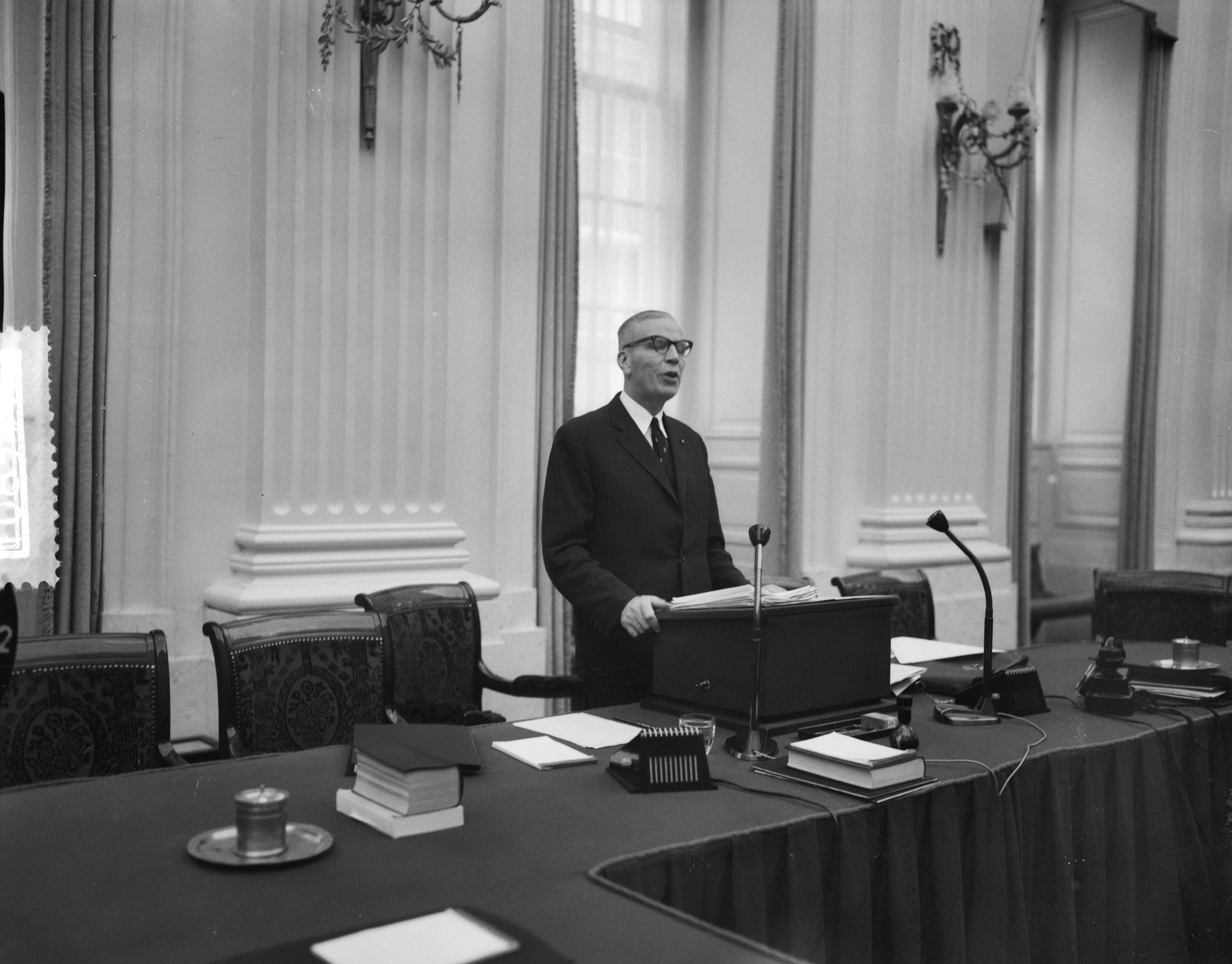
Minister of Justice Albert Beerman during a debate about the budget on 19 November 1959, in which the Breda Four were also discussed

During a debate in 1959, Minister of Justice Albert Beerman (CHU) said the Four would qualify for clemency and emphasised that clemency was a prerogative of the Crown. Encouraged by Beerman, progressive criminal law experts Jacob Maarten van Bemmelen and Willem Pompe pleaded in Nederlands Juristenblad in 1963 for the release of the four prisoners. The publicity backfired and led to public outrage, which made Beerman refrain from clemency.

Former chairs of the Foundation Supervision of the Political Offenders (Dutch: Stichting Toezicht Politieke Delinquenten, STPD) Frans Duynstee and Jaap le Poole wrote a reaction in support of Pompe's and Van Bemmelen's article a month after its publication. Le Poole, who had been active in the resistance and was a former PvdA MP, continued behind the scenes to convince influential individuals of clemency. He introduced Stempel to various Dutch journalists and politicians.

A month after Van Bemmelen and Pompe, the bishop of the Diocese of 's-Hertogenbosch, Wilhelmus Marinus Bekkers, also publicly argued for a pardon. In September 1964, the auxilary bishop of Cologne Wilhelm Cleven met with Beerman's successor Ynso Scholten (CHU) to ask for the release of the Breda Four at some point on behalf of the German Episcopate. Although Scholten believed they could not remain in Dutch prison for the rest of their lives, he saw insufficient parliamentary support and rejected their clemency requests on 24 October 1964.

Le Poole had some success with Ivo Samkalden (PvdA), who had started as Minister of Justice on 14 April 1965. He rejected collective clemency, but was open to individual clemency, in particular for Kotalla given his psychiatric evaluations. Meanwhile, the Supreme Court also changed its advice on clemency for Kotalla, from negative in 1960 to positive in 1962 and 1963. Public opinion and the view from National Institute for War Documentation historian Ben Sijes that release might hinder the prosecution of war criminals in Germany and Austria, prevented Samkalden from giving clemency. Samkalden also wanted to wait until after the controversial wedding between the Dutch crown princess Beatrix and the German Claus von Amsberg in March 1966.

== Sentence interruption of Lages (1966) ==
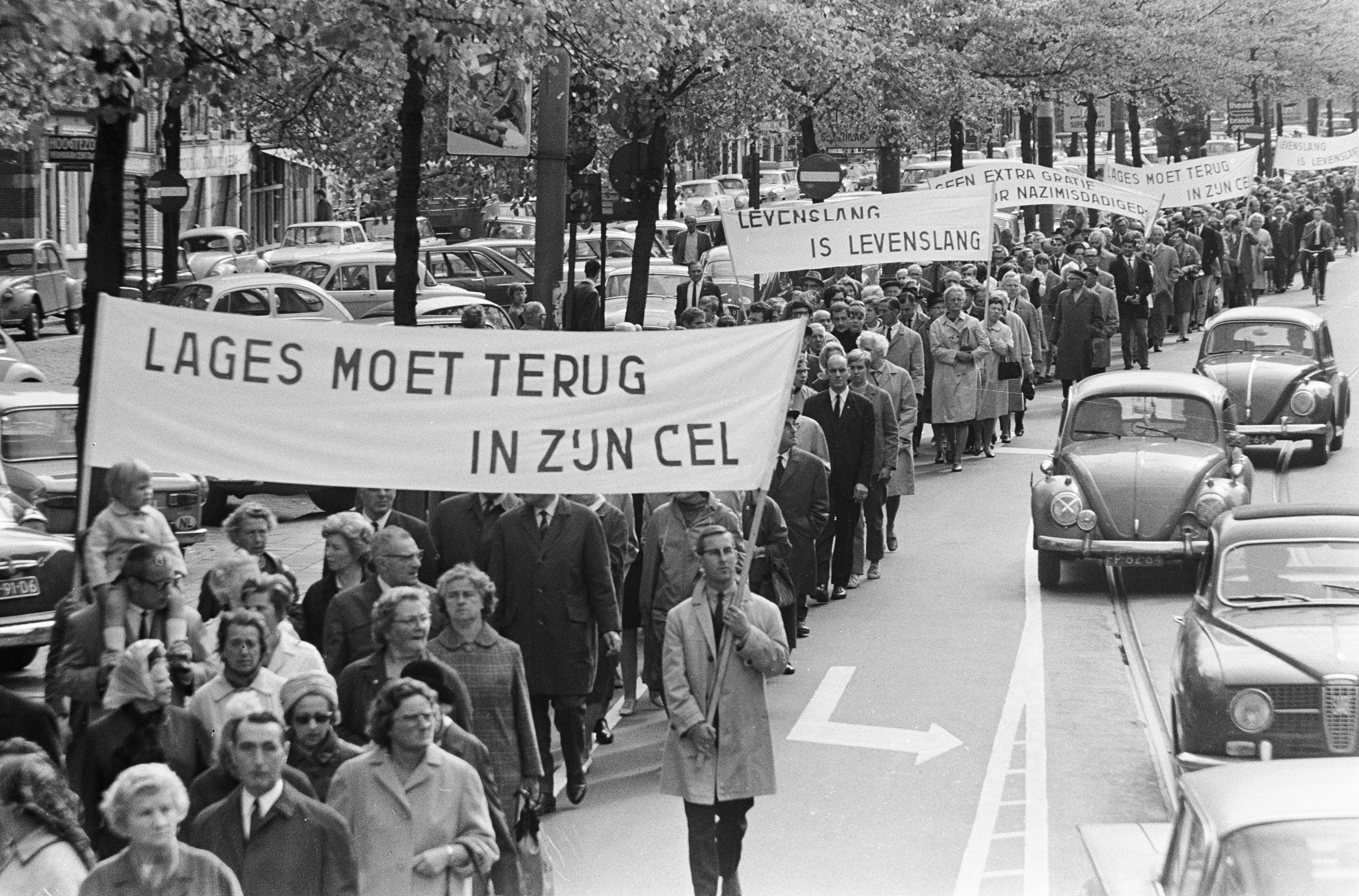
Protest in Amsterdam on 18 September 1966 against the sentence interruption of Lages. Sign in the front (translated): "Lages must return to his cell"

In May 1966, Lages was hospitalised with colorectal cancer and doctors did not expect him to survive surgery. After Le Poole brought this to the attention of Samkalden, Samkalden granted a three-month suspension of his sentence to receive treatment in Germany. He was transferred to a hospital in Braunlage on 9 June 1966. When German ambassador Karl Hermann Knoke was informed the day before, he also asked for the release of Kotalla who had a heart condition, which Samkalden refused.

There was a disgruntled reaction to Lages' release from the former resistance and war victims. A demonstration of 150 people took place in Amsterdam. There was also commotion within Samkaldens own party, with some Jewish members expressing disbelief that the Jewish Samkalden had made this decision. Despite the unrest, the decision was accepted by the coalition parties.

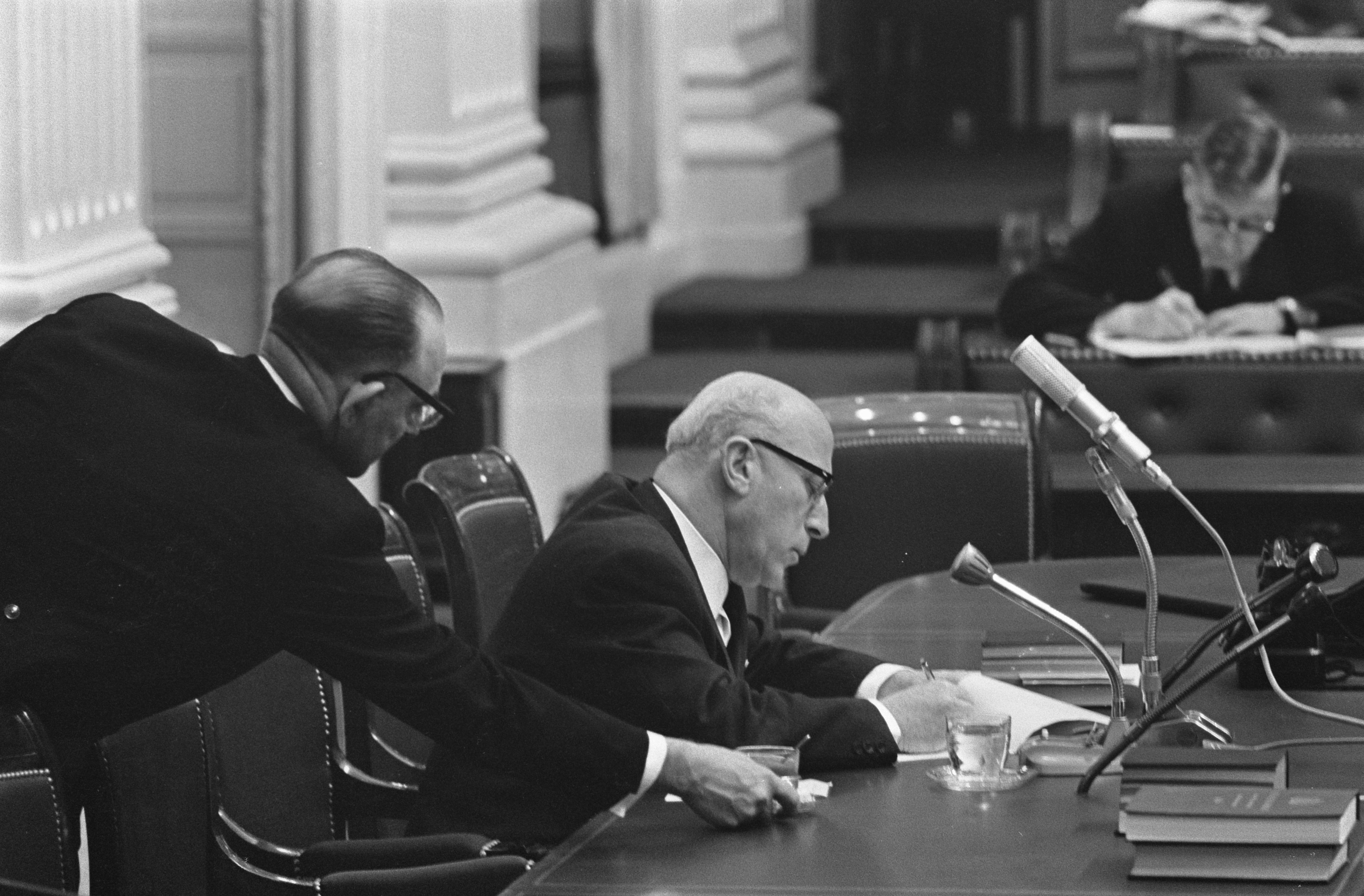
Minister of Justice Ivo Samkalden during a debate on 4 October 1966 about the release of Lages

Less than a month later, Samkalden was informed that Lages did not have cancer, but severe bowel obstruction as a result of polyarteritis nodosa. This was life threatening, but not acutely fatal. He was unable to imprison Lages again, because of Lages' medical condition and the fact that the West German constitution did not allow extradition. 2,000 protesters showed up for another protest in Amsterdam. During a debate in the House on 4 October 1966, Samkalen kept the support of the coalition parties and the CHU. Lages was released from the hospital in November 1966, but stayed in Braunlage, where he died in 1971.

== Proposal for conditional release (1969) ==
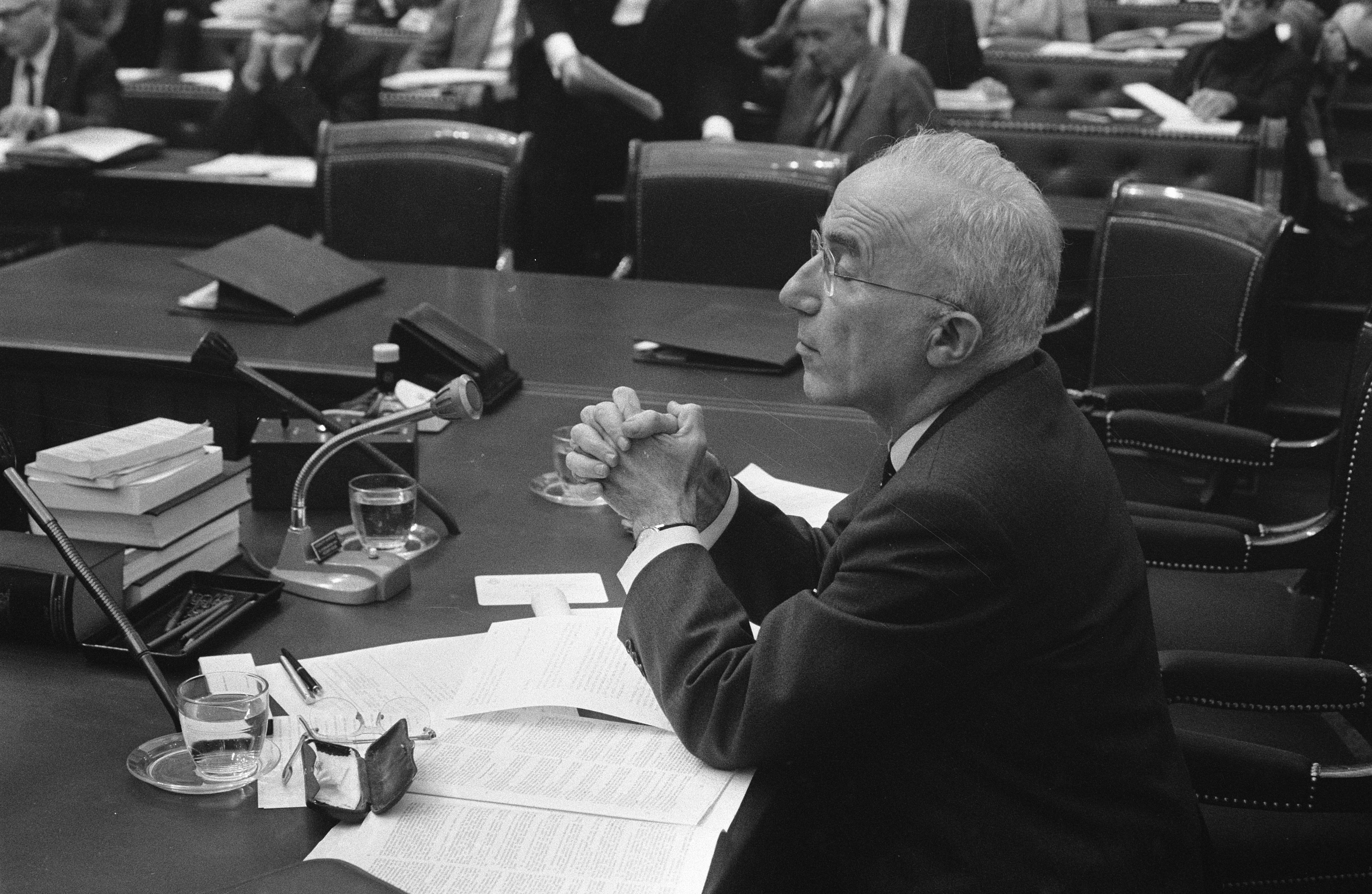
Minister of Justice Carel Polak during a debate about the Breda Three on 21 October 1969

Lages' controversial release complicated in the subsequent years the pardoning of the other three, particularly Kotalla, who was suffering from heart disease. The West German government paused their interventions for a while. In June 1967, their lawyer filed new clemency requests. At the request of German Foreign Minister Willy Brandt (SPD), North Rhine-Westphalian Minister of Justice, Josef Neuberger (SPD) brought up the release in a meeting with the new Duch Minister of Justice Carel Polak (VVD).

Polak preferred amending the Criminal Code to allow for the conditional release of those sentenced to life imprisonment after twenty years over clemency. This way, the process would be transparent and with the involvement of parliament. In consultation with the Council of Ministers, he confidentially gauged the opinions of the parliamentary leaders in August 1969. There was significant division within the parliamentary groups, but a majority of 85 members supported the proposal.

The confidential consultation leaked, leading to societal unrest, particularly among former resistance groups and Jewish communities. On the other hand there were supporters; Churches and rehabilitation associations advocated for release, and the four Bureaus for Mental Public Health argued that detaining the Three would relieve no sorrow for victims. Despite parliamentary support, Polak sent a letter to parliament on 29 September 1969 withdrawing his proposal.

=== 1969 debate ===
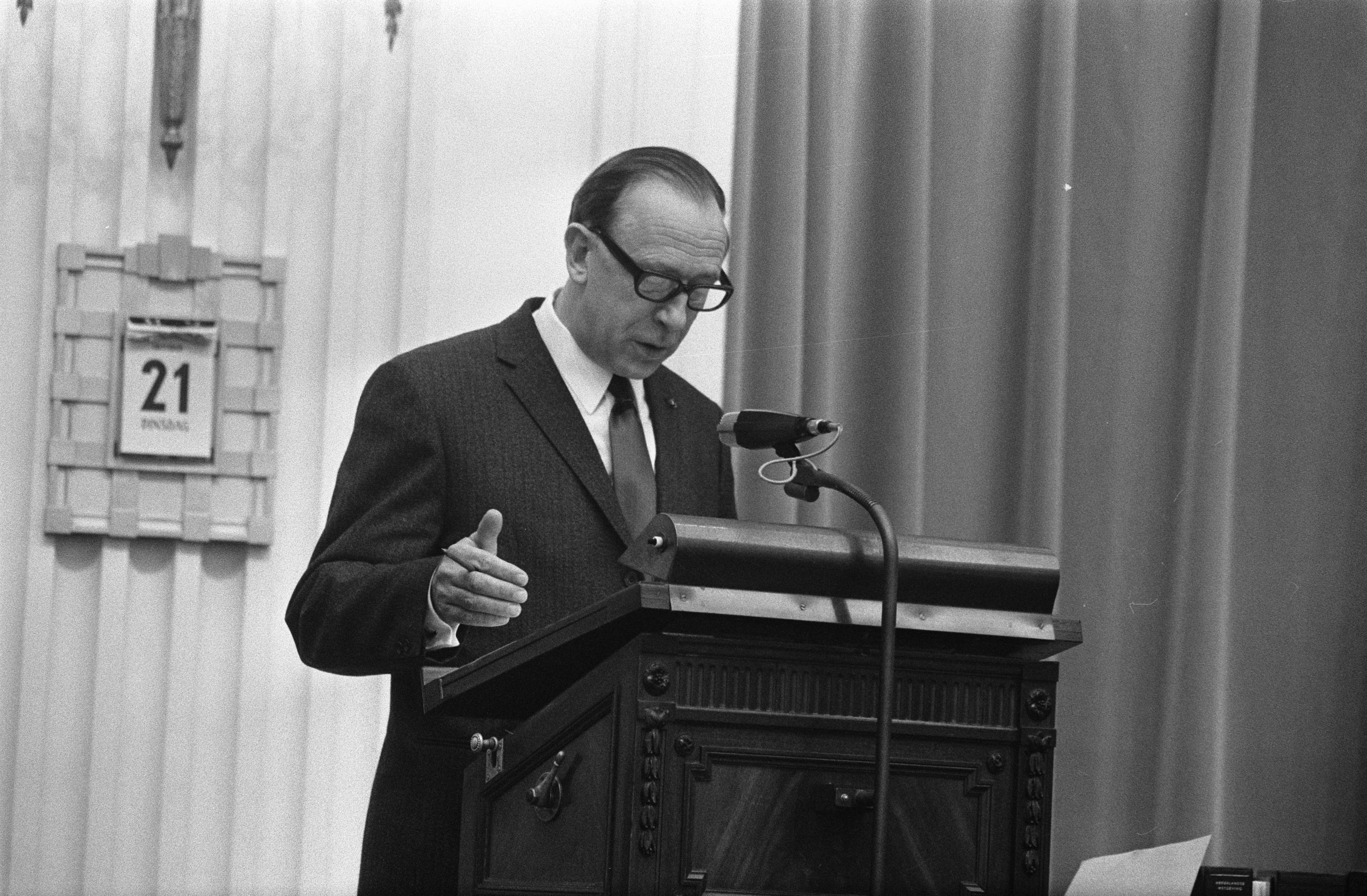
Parliamentarian Theo van Schaik (KVP) during a debate about the Breda Three on 21 October 1969

On 21 October 1969, the issue came up in the House during a debate about the Justice budget. Parliamentarian Theo van Schaik (KVP), a former student of Pompe, had announced his intention to submit a motion urging the cabinet to introduce the bill, despite Polak's attempts to dissuade him. During the debate, Van Schaik argued that the bill would provide legal equality. He also contended that the Dutch population suffered from the presence of the Three and that life imprisonment obscured the sense of justice within the legal system. As a final argument, he stated that it was intolerable for the Three to repeatedly be filled with hope only to be rejected without prospect. After this final argument, loud outbursts erupted from the gallery, and the debate was interrupted.

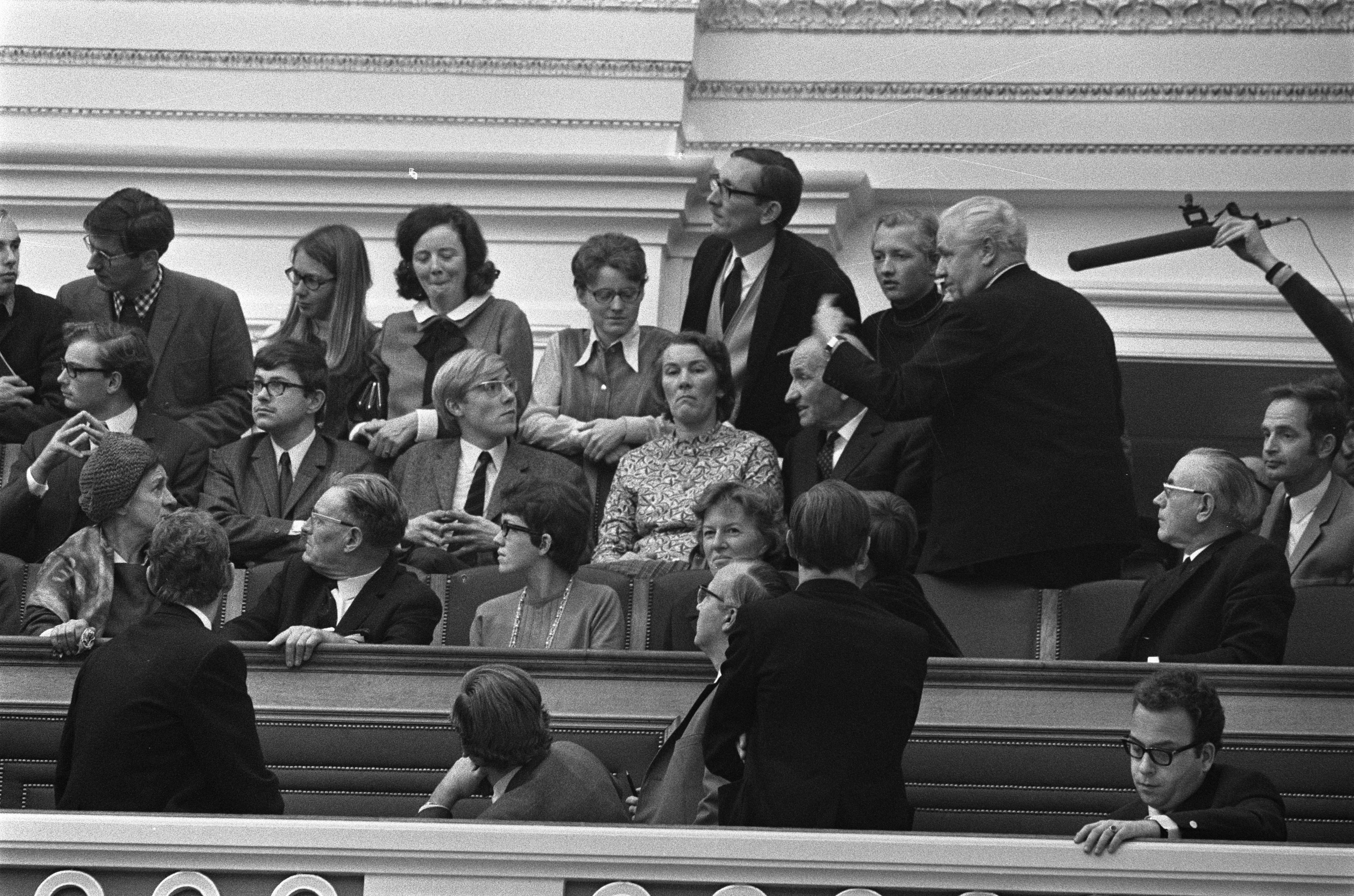
Speaker of the House Frans-Jozef van Thiel on the public gallery of the House of Representatives during a suspension of the debate about the Breda Three on 21 October 1969

In the debate, the motion faced criticism from parliamentarians. A point of criticism was that the motion used the commotion, which it itself fueled, as an argument. Another point was that a general legislative amendment was being used when the issue was specifically about the Three. During the second round of the debate, Polak managed to persuade Van Schaik to withdraw the motion. According to Van Schaik, the resistance was too great. Polak subsequently denied the clemency requests.

== Height of public debate (1971–1972) ==
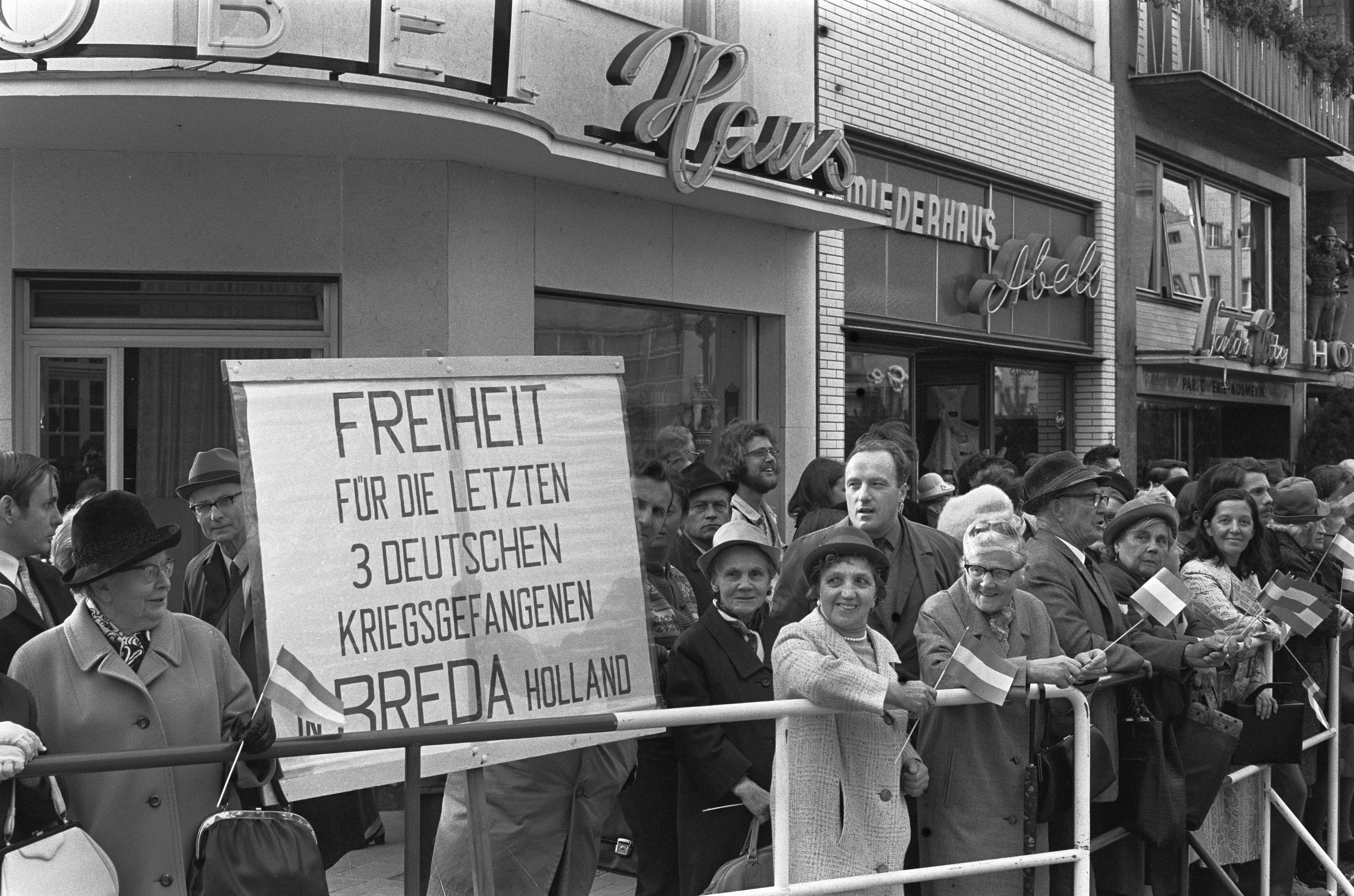
Germans protesting for the release of the three prisoners during a visit of Queen of the Netherlands Juliana and Prince Bernhard to Bonn in 1971

In 1971, Dries van Agt (KVP) took office as Minister of Justice. Within the field of criminal law, he was considered progressive. During his first meeting with journalists, he indicated that he planned to release the Breda Three. In what he later referred to as self-deprecating humor, Van Agt remarked that it would probably be more difficult for him as an "Aryan" than it had been for his predecessor. This comment immediately sparked outrage.

During a debate in October 1971, Van Agt promised that he would consult the House before releasing the Three. He later regretted the promise. After receiving positive and unanimous advice from the judiciary, the cabinet wanted to proceed with clemency. They consulted the parliamentary leaders, which revealed that a majority would agree. On 16 February 1972, the cabinet sent a letter about the intention to the House.

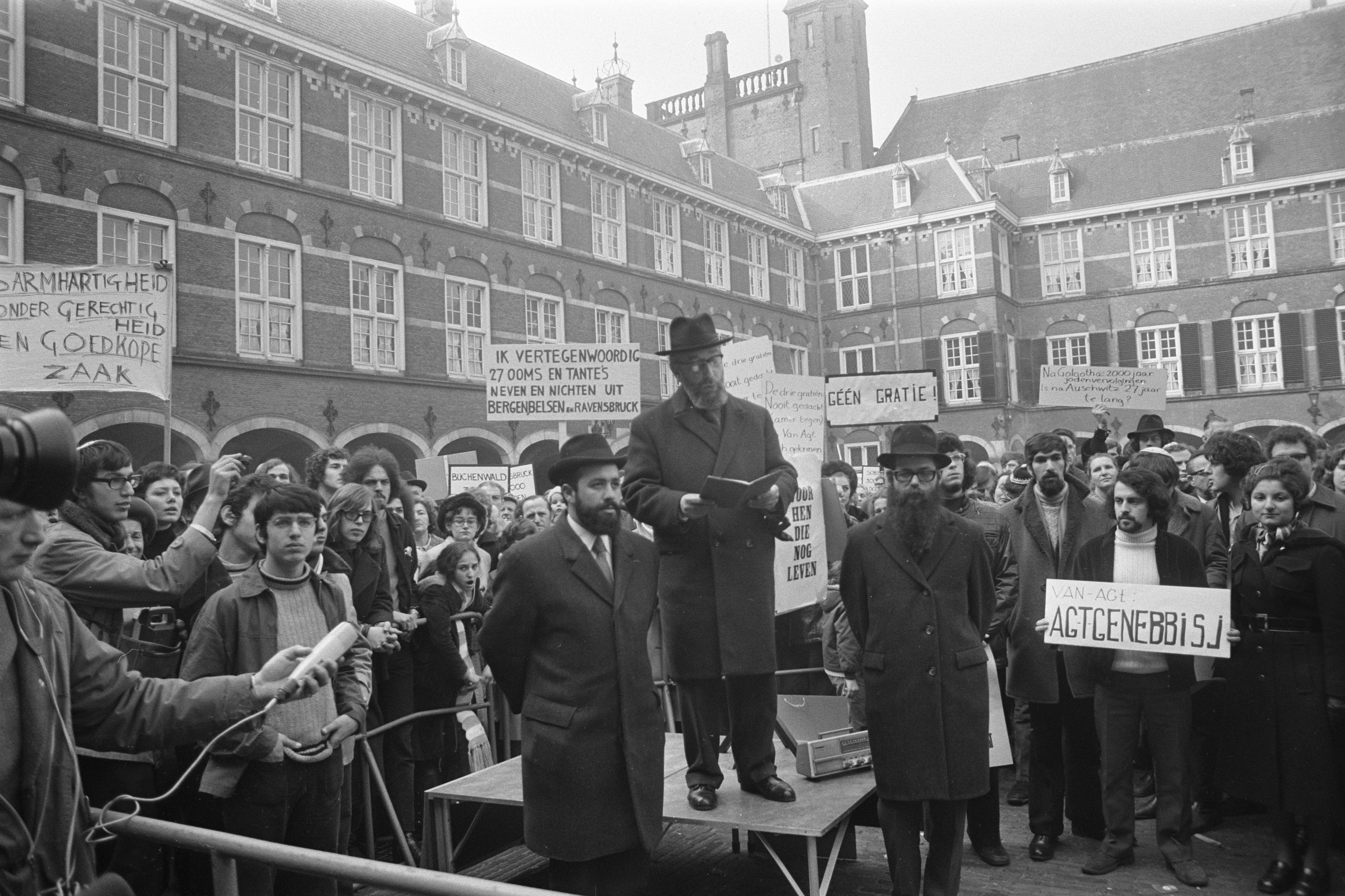
Protest at the Binnenhof on 29 February 1972 against the possible release

The proposal for release was made during a period of increased focus on the suffering of war victims. This attention was partly due to the research conducted by psychiatrist Jan Bastiaans and his documentary Now Do You Get It Why I'm Crying? (1969). The plan to release them received extensive media attention and stirred strong emotions.

War victims and former resistance fighters established an umbrella organisation, the Central Organisation of Former Resistance and Victims 1940–1945 (COVVS), with the primary aim of preventing the release of the Breda Three. In this effort, both communist and non-communist resistance organisations collaborated after decades of rivalry. There was also pressure from abroad, with the Israeli cabinet objecting to their release. Many parliamentarians received phone calls at home, including threats, and Van Agt had to go into hiding with his family.

=== Public hearing ===
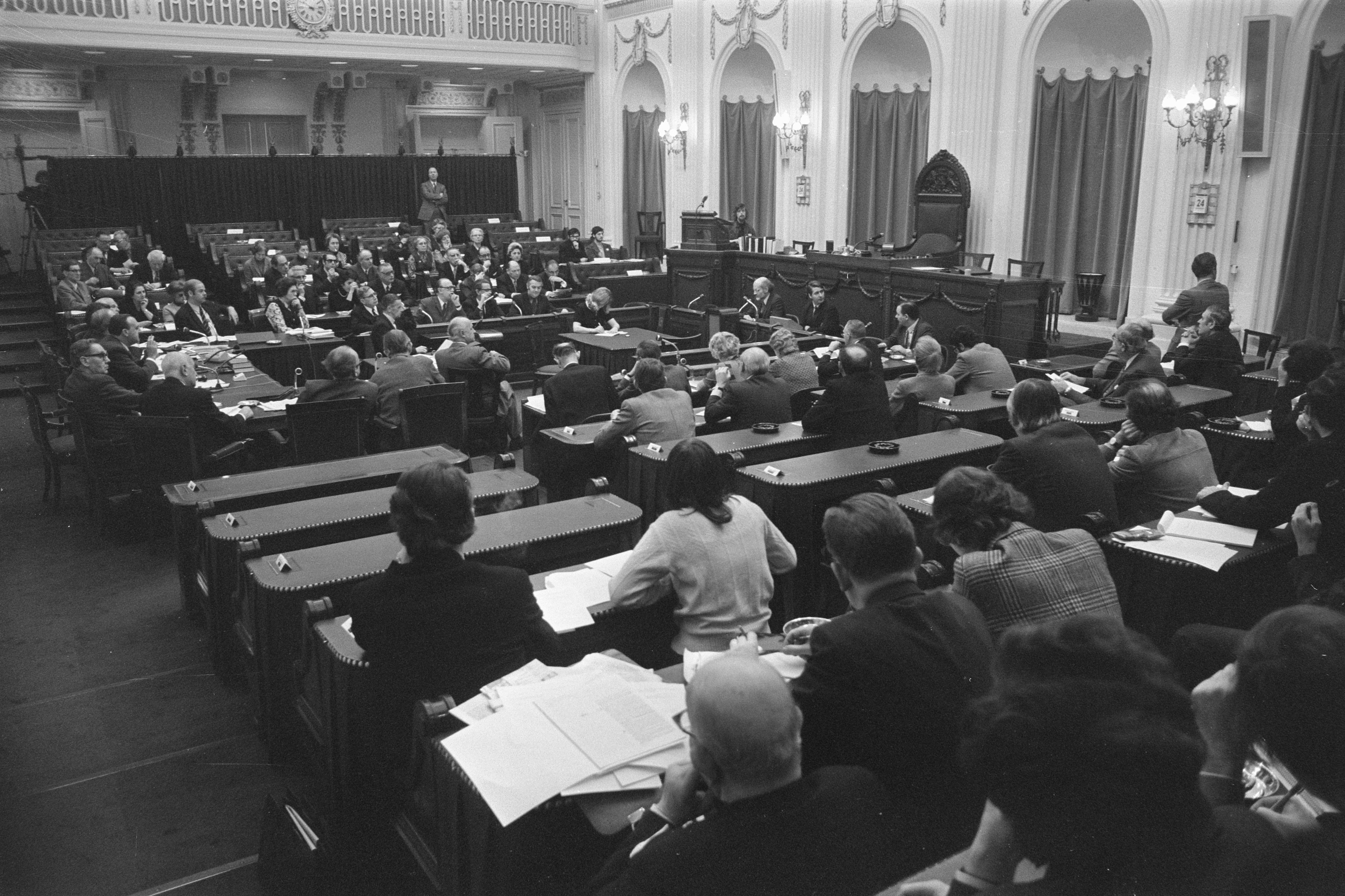
Hearing on the release of the Breda Three on 24 February 1972

Although the cabinet had hoped that the House would refrain from a painful discussion, a hearing was initiated by Anneke Goudsmit (D'66). The decisive factor was Goudsmit's remark that victims never had the opportunity to bring up the suffering they had endured in parliament. A day before the hearing, the documentary "Now Do You Get It Why I'm Crying?" was shown to members of parliament, which made many of them doubtful already, and three days later on national television.

During the hearing on 24 February 1972, 50 speakers representing 43 organisations spoke, the majority of whom were against release. The hearing was emotional, as became evident from the commotion surrounding a speech by criminal law scholar Louk Hulsman on behalf of the association for criminal law reform, Coornhert-Liga. After three psychiatrists, including Bastiaans, argued that releasing the Breda Three would have negative consequences for the victims, Hulsman advocated for release. When he argued that keeping the Breda Three in prison did not help the victims, shouts of "Yes, it does" came from the spectators. The hearing had to be temporarily halted because there was a threat of physical altercation among spectators.

=== 1972 debate ===
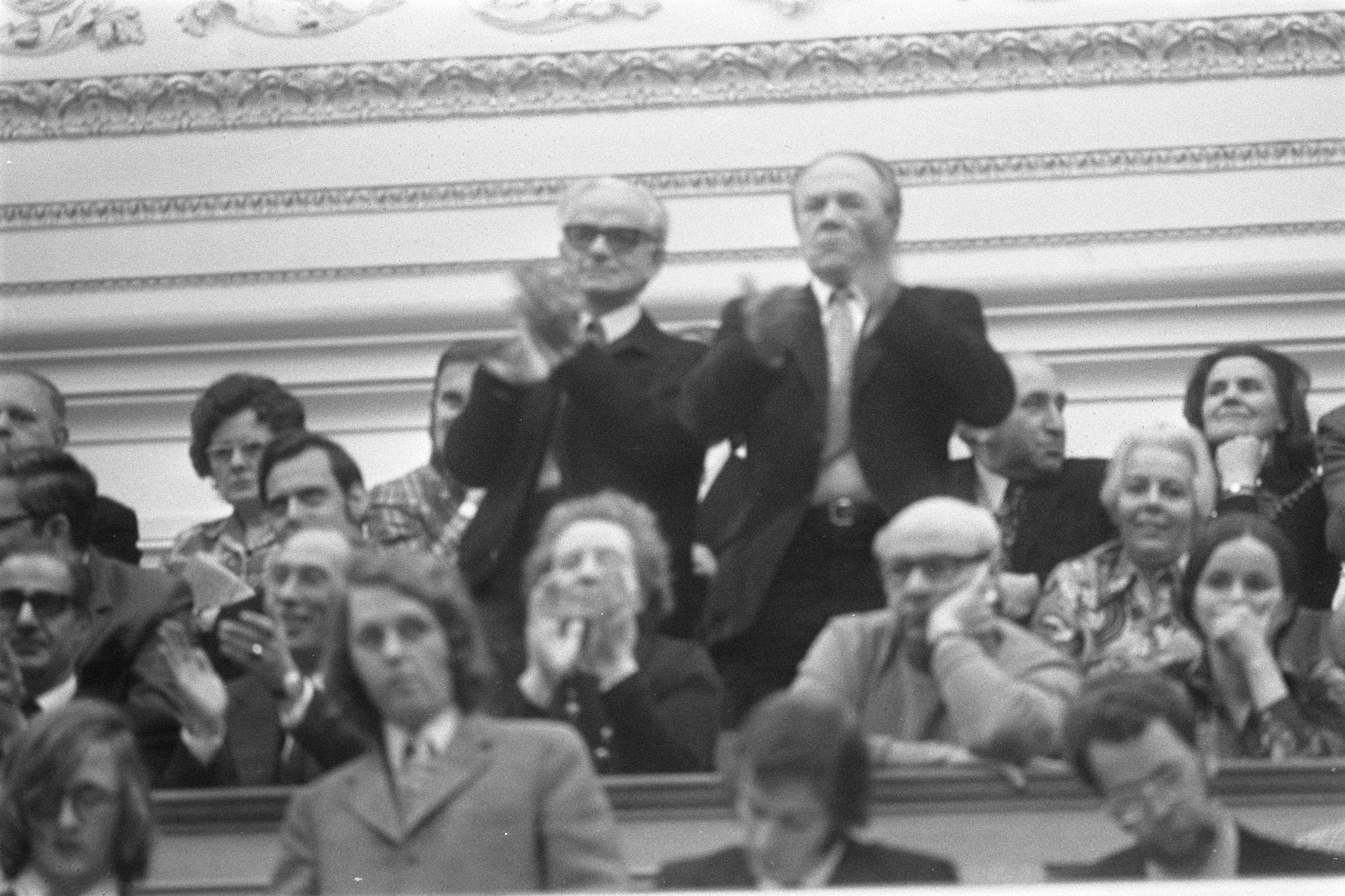
Applause in the public gallery of the House of Representatives during the debate on 29 February 1972

The hearings and public discussion had persuaded a significant number of members of parliament to vote against the release. Despite the opposition to the release, Van Agt wanted to proceed. According to him, the expulsion of the Three was preferable to repeatedly reopening wounds that had only partially healed. On 29 February 1972, the debate on the release lasted thirteen hours. As the debate progressed, there was increasing applause and shouting from the public gallery. A motion tabled by Joop Voogd (PvdA) calling for the Three not to be released was adopted with 85 votes in favor and 61 against. A large number of parties were divided in their voting.

=== Government statement ===
On 3 and 4 March, the cabinet discussed the outcome of the debate. Amongst others, ministers Kees Boertien (ARP), Van Agt, Piet Engels, and Pierre Lardinois (both KVP) wanted the cabinet to proceed with granting clemency. Others, including Norbert Schmelzer (KVP) and Hans de Koster (VVD), were opposed. Molly Geertsema (VVD), who had always been against the release, even threatened to resign if they were released, according to De Tijd. The initial draft proposal was to release Fischer, keep the clemency request of Kotalla, and to reject that of Aus der Fünten. However, due to objections, this plan was reconsidered.

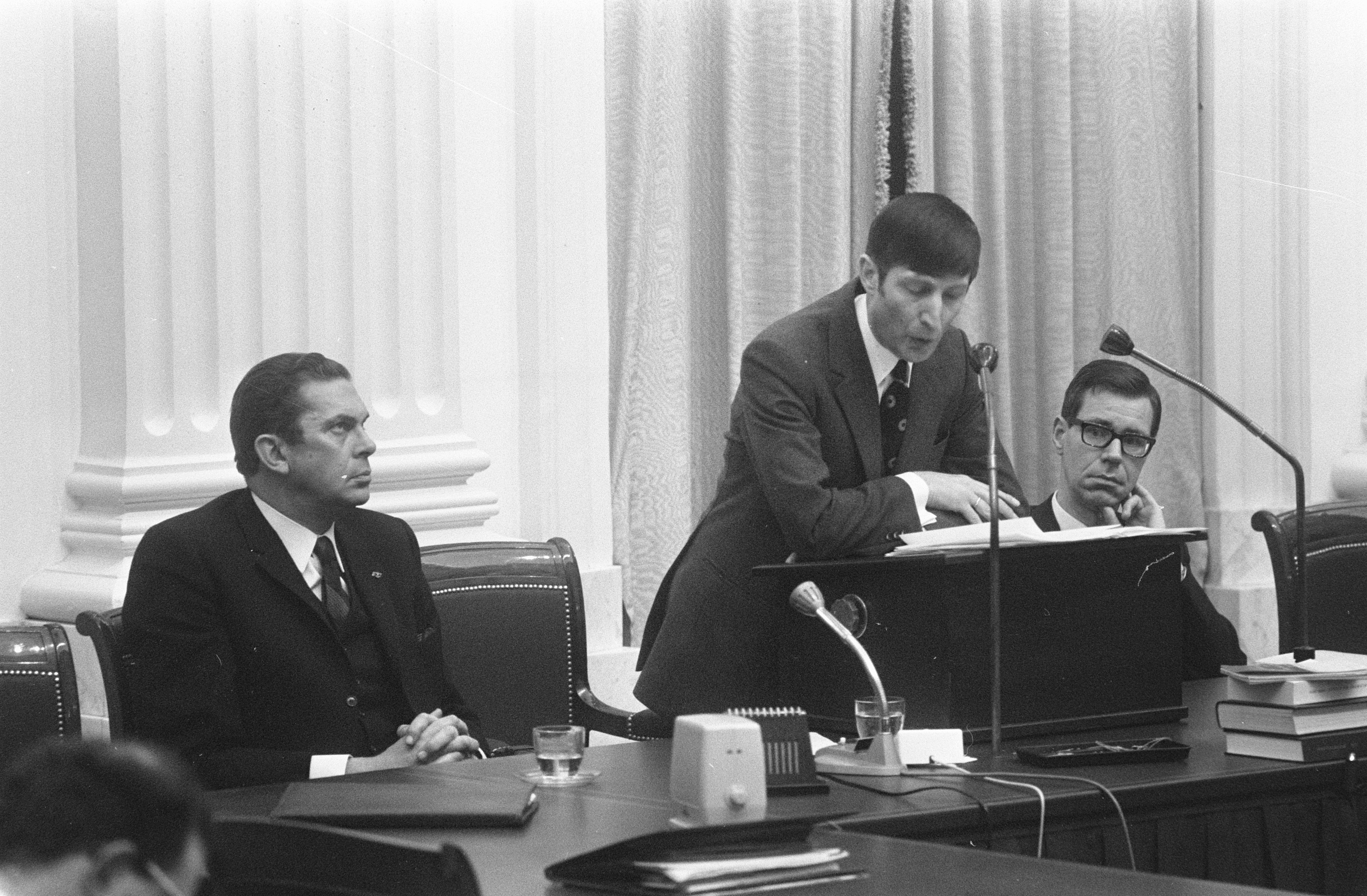
Prime Minister Barend Biesheuvel and Minister of Justice Dries van Agt during a debate on 29 February 1972 in the House of Representatives about the release of the Breda Three

Ultimately, on 4 March, the cabinet presented a statement in which they abandoned the collective release. The cabinet emphasised that it retained the right to grant clemency on an individual basis. They announced additional examinations into the physical and mental condition of the detainees. In the event of any clemency, the cabinet stated that they would seek advice from experts, including individuals who are trusted in circles of resistance members and victims. The debate on the release also contributed to provisions for victims of World War II.

To get advice from resistance members and the persecuted, a "trust committee" was established with a delegation of seven members from COVVS. This committee, whose composition changed over time, consisted at the start solely of opponents of the release, including Hans Teengs Gerritsen (chairman) and Herman Milikowski. In addition to the government examination, they appointed their own medical expert, Hans Hers, to determine the health condition of the detainees.

== Kotalla's death (1973–1979) ==
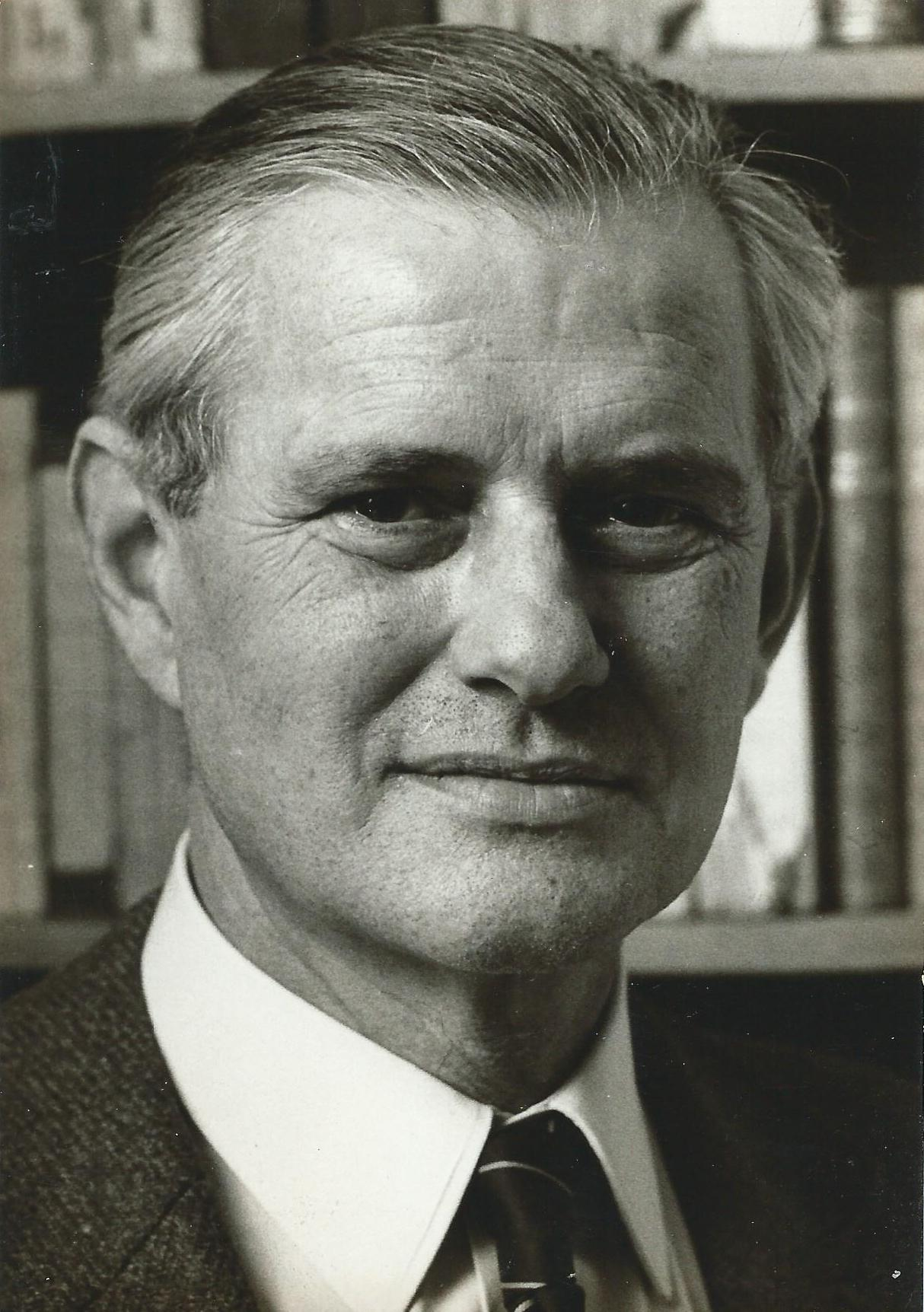
Medical advisor of the trust committee, Hans Hers

On 30 October 1973, Kotalla suffered a hemorrhagic stroke, resulting in partial paralysis. His health deteriorated further due to a pulmonary embolism he contracted in the hospital, leading officials and the minister to believe that he would not survive. Hers visited Kotalla in the hospital and concluded that although Kotalla was in poor condition, he was not yet in the dying phase. The trust committee remained opposed to release, although they understood if the minister decided to proceed with it. Due to a lack of support, Van Agt refrained from granting clemency.

From the German side, the stroke was a reason for renewed pressure. Priest Ernst Wilms, who advocated for the last imprisoned German war criminals in Europe, sent a telegram to the ministry urging the release of the Three. The German ambassador to the Netherlands, Adolf Max Obermayer, also insisted on it, but without success.

It was not until December 1974 that Kotalla was transferred from the hospital back to Breda, a move he had pushed for, in part, through a hunger strike. His lawyer Nouwen filed for a preliminary injunction, arguing amongst other that prolonged detention of Kotalla was inhumane. When this failed, he appealed all the way up to the European Court of Human Rights, where it was also rejected.

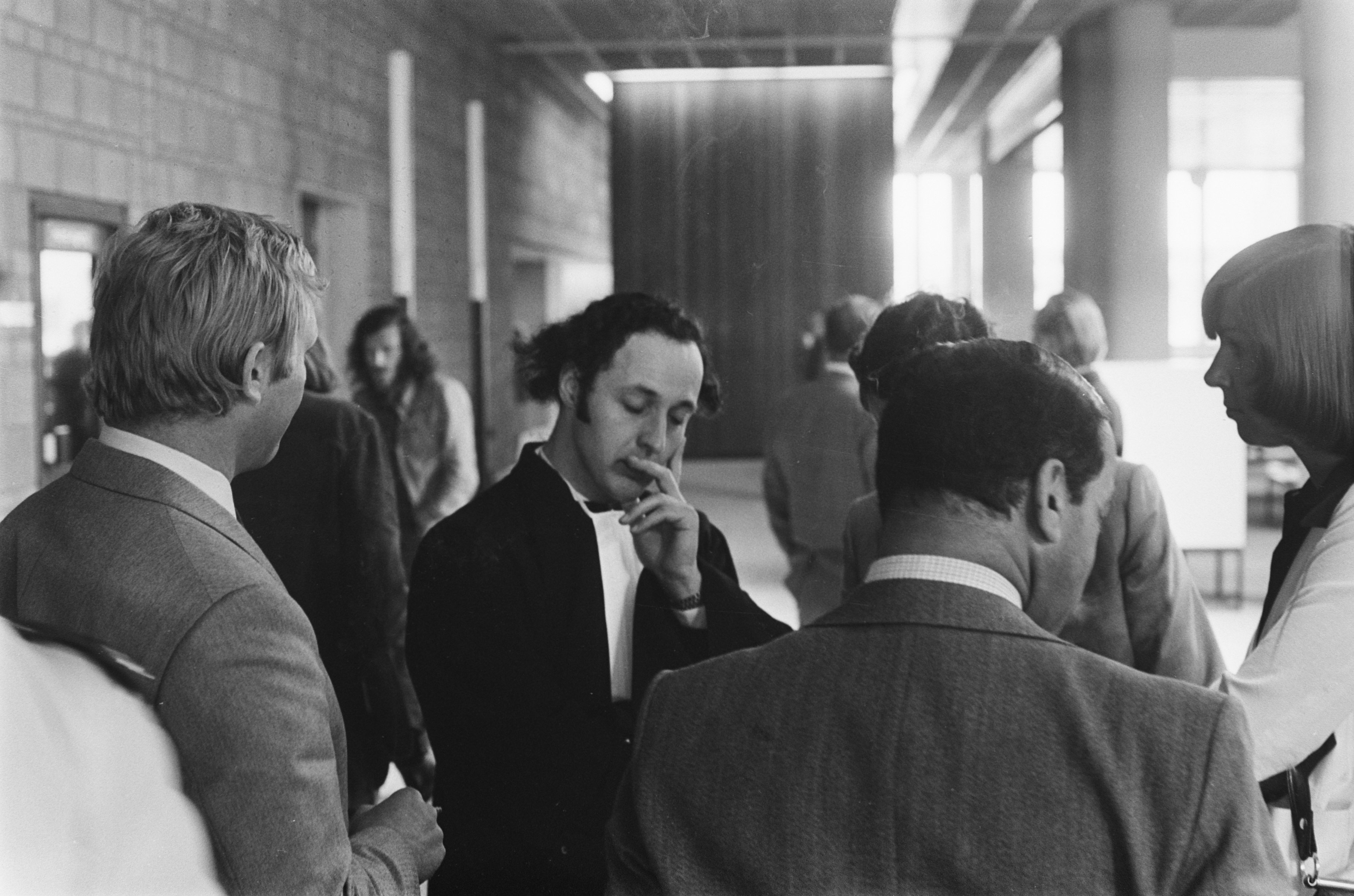
Kotalla's lawyer, Nouwen, during the court case for a preliminary injunction in July 1975

In subsequent years, Kotalla's physical and mental health continued to decline. A prison doctor concluded around June 1979 that Kotalla's death was near. The new minister of Justice, Job de Ruiter (CDA), made preparations for release and sent Hers to visit Kotalla on 6 July 1979. Hers told the trust committee he was not able to say how long Kotalla was going to live, but that he was not in immediate life-threatening danger. Based on this, the trust committee opposed release as he was not "in the eye of death". Without their support, De Ruiter considers releasing Kotalla political suicide, so he decided not to proceed.

In the next weeks, Kotalla's health detoriated further. Despite the pleas from his caregivers, Kotalla was neither re-examined nor released. On 31 July 1979, Kotalla died in prison. He was the only convicted German war criminal who died in the Dutch prison.

== Release (1982–1989) ==
In 1982, Frits Korthals Altes (VVD) became Minister of Justice. Like his party, he was against release. His strategy was to address the topic of the Breda Two as little as possible in order to prevent unrest among victims. Nevertheless, there was publicity, especially when the Bundestag unanimously adopted a motion tabled by Alois Mertes (CDU) in 1982, which urged the release of amongst others Fischer and Aus der Fünten. On the advice of the German ambassador to the Netherlands, Otto von der Gablentz, this motion was not carried out, and Germany largely refrained from raising the issue. This approach was intended to convince the former resistance that there was no German pressure.

=== Group of nineteen ===
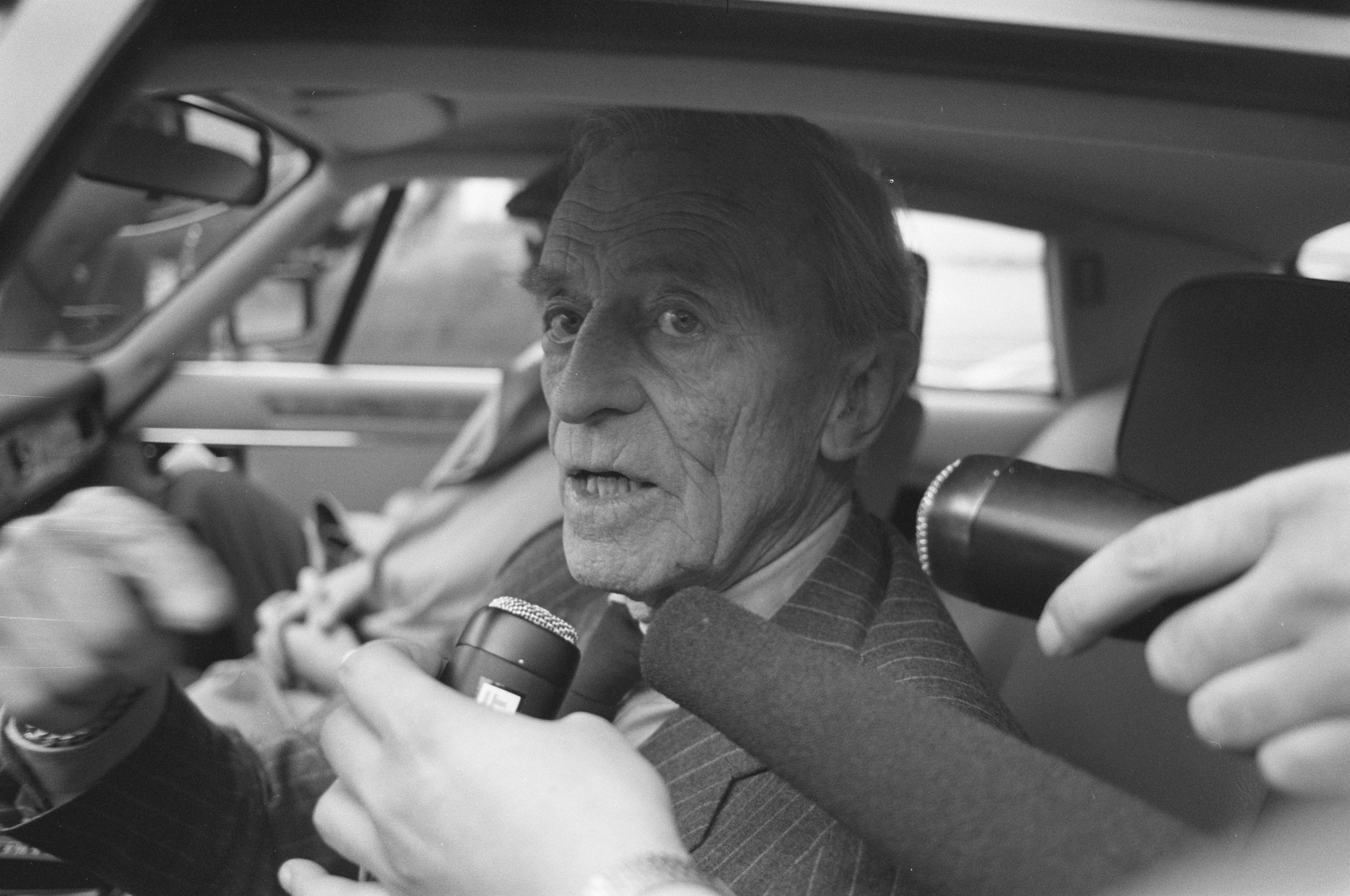
Former member of the trust committee and one of the group of nineteen, Hans Teengs Gerritsen, after a visit to the Catshuis on 24 January 1989, regarding the Breda Two

In the background, Bib van Lanschot particularly advocated for release. In 1987, he had Fischer and Aus der Fünten send a letter to parliamentary leaders, several ministers, and resistance organisations. The confidential letter was leaked. The negative or dismissive reactions led to the conclusion that this was not the right approach.

Van Lanschot was involved in the Resistance Memorial Cross, which had to promote unity within the former resistance outside of the opposition to the release of the Breda Two. Around the committee, a group of prominent figures, including resistance fighters and politicians, emerged who wanted to work towards their release. Some of them, such as Teengs Gerritsen and Hers, had altered their views on the release as time progressed. To this end, they drew up a letter, which they presented to Korthals Altes and Prime Minister Ruud Lubbers on 5 July 1988. (Note: The full list of signatories: Peter Baehr, Dien Barendsen-Cleveringa, Wim Couwenberg, Christiaan Justus Enschedé, Frans Feij, Til Gardeniers-Berendsen, Hans Hers, C.C. van den Heuvel, Piet de Jong, Bib van Lanschot, Theo van Lier, W. Nijsse, Gerard Peijnenburg, Eric Roest, Ivo Samkalden, David Simons, Max van der Stoel, Hans Teengs Gerritsen, Wim Tensen. Jos Kapteyn, Minus Polak and Gerard Veringa were also involved, but refrained from signing to prevent an overrepresentation of members of the Council of State) They pointed out, among other things, that the Netherlands was the last country where German war criminals had been continuously imprisoned since 1945.

=== Korthals Altes ===
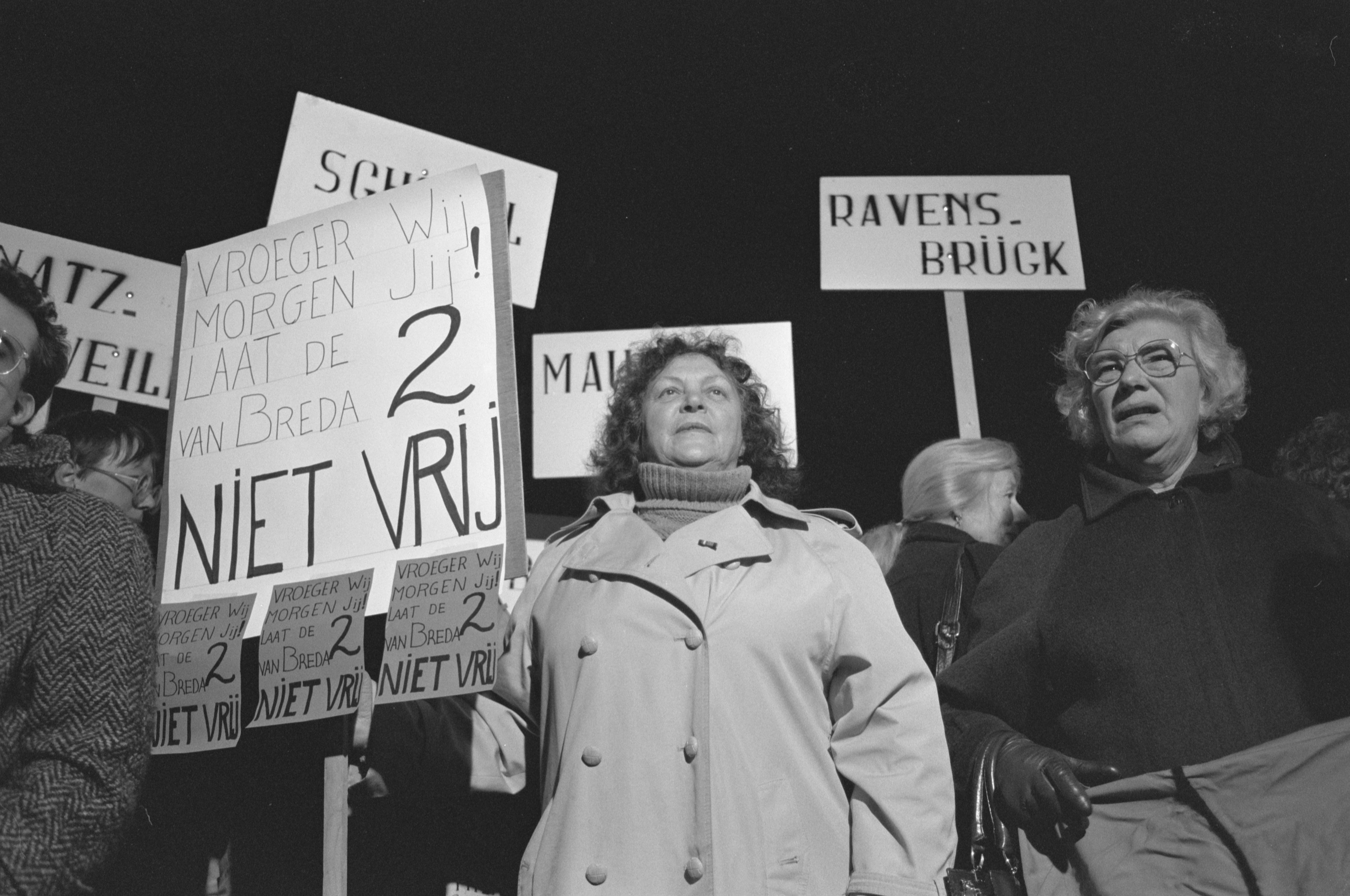
Protest at the Binnenhof on 26 January 1989 against the possible release of the Two

Just before the visit of the group of nineteen, Korthals Altes had ordered an investigation into the medical condition of the prisoners due to concerning signals. However, the medical specialists concluded that their condition was not such that release for medical reasons was necessary. After the examination, Korthals Altes informed the group of nineteen on 5 January 1989 that the release would not be easily achieved.

Nevertheless, Korthals Altes decided to consult the parliamentary leaders about clemency with the help of a delegation of the group of nineteen. Korthals Altes also met with the remaining members of the trust committee (Note: Fenna Diemer-Lindeboom, Harm Buiter, Jan de Graaf, Henk Neuman and Hilda Verwey-Jonker) as well as Bastiaans, all of whom support the release. On 24 January 1989, he sent a letter to the House expressing his intention to release the Two. In addition to the letter from the group of nineteen, he cited the expectation that the discussion would not subside, meaning the goal of sparing the victims would not be achieved. In his memoirs, Korthals Altes also says that the individual care they receive in detention might be life-prolonging, which would prolong the suffering of victims as well. He wanted to revisit, with the approval of the House, the commitment made in 1972 that simultaneous release would be refrained from.

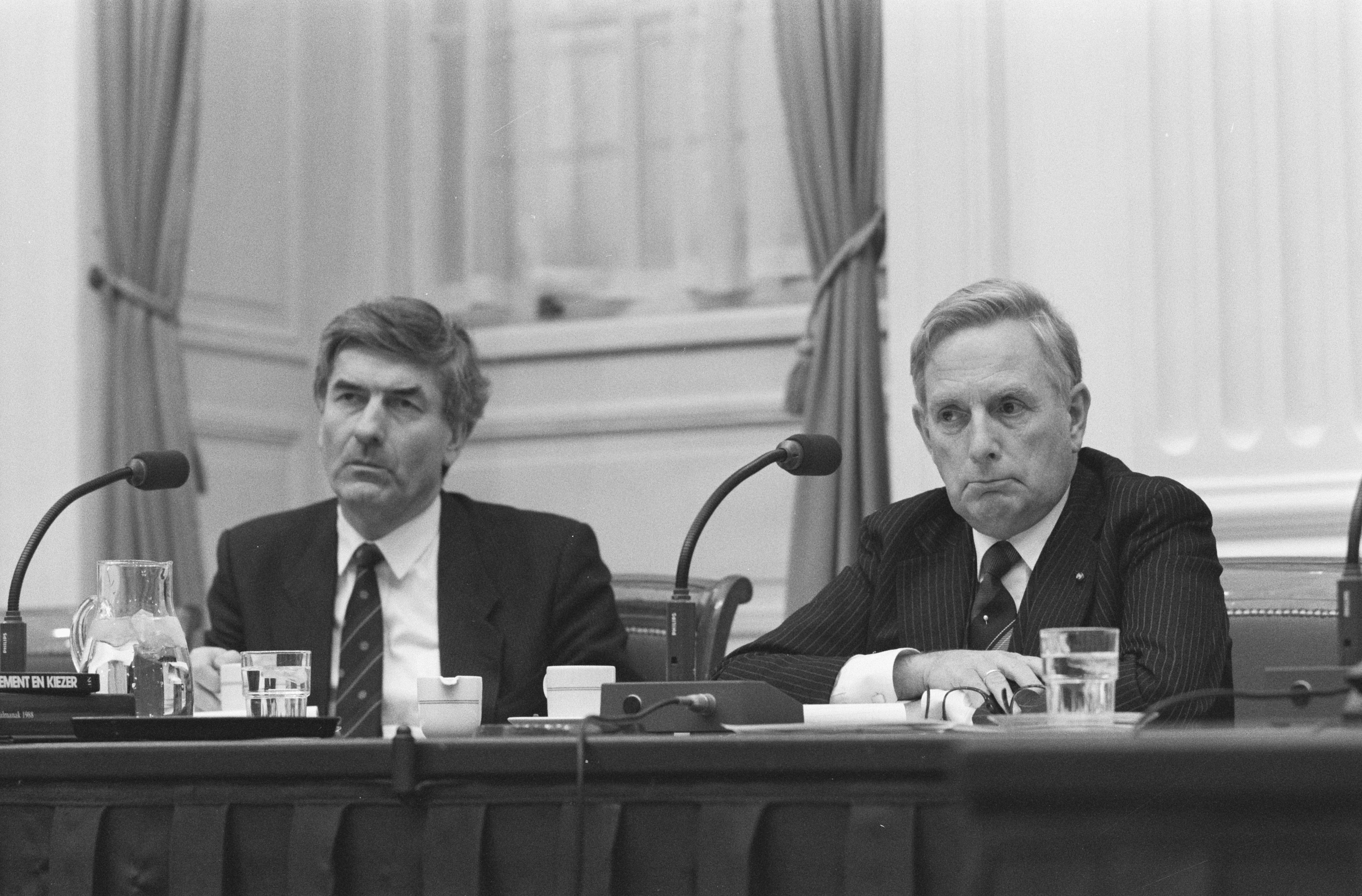
Prime Minister Ruud Lubbers and Minister of Justice Frits Korthals Altes during the debate on 27 January 1989 about the release

The House acted quickly, without too much publicity. A hearing with representatives of victims and the resistance was held in private on Thursday 26 January. That same day, a two-day debate on the matter began, even though the House normally doesn't debate on Fridays. The arguments exchanged during this debate were not substantially different from those in 1972, although far less emotional. A motion tabled by Ineke Haas-Berger (PvdA) to refrain from granting clemency except on an individual basis was rejected with 55 votes in favor and 85 votes against. A few hours after the debate, Fischer and Aus der Fünten were expelled across the border as undesirable foreigners.

== Aftermath ==
=== Germany ===
On the day of the release, German President Richard von Weizsäcker thanked the Dutch parliament for this decision. The German Foreign Office praised the Dutch government for using humanitarian reasons in its decisions and added that Fischer and Aus der Fünten would not receive a formal welcome. Fischer and Aus der Fünten received a federal pension, after Fischer's North Rhine-Westphalian pension was revoked. Their pension was supplemented by donations, including from Stille Hilfe. Aus der Fünten died in April 1989, and Fischer died in September 1989.

=== Netherlands ===
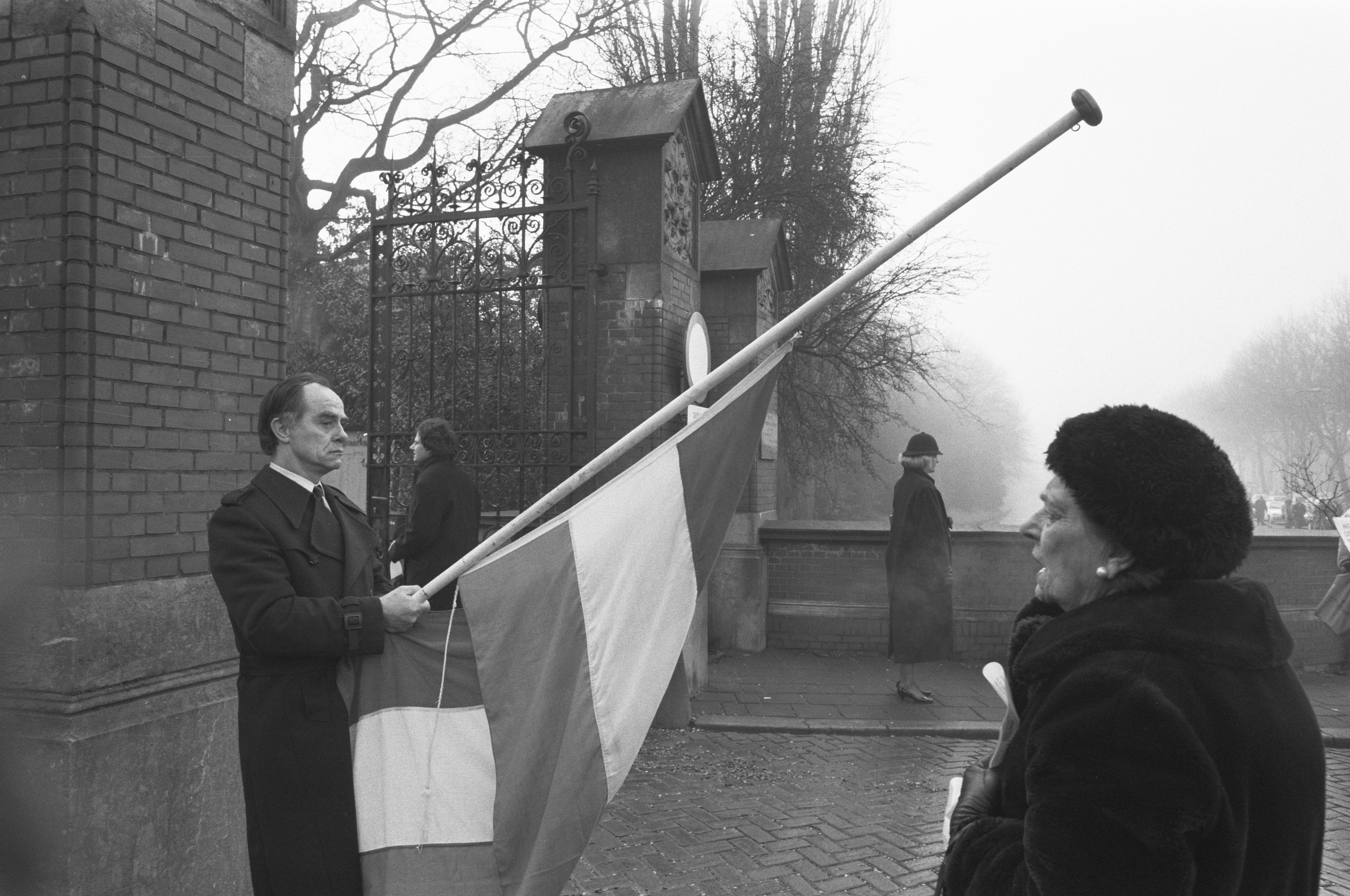
In protest against the release, the Dutch flag is flown at half-mast during the Auschwitz commemoration on 29 January 1989

Although the political debate ended with the release, public outrage continued for some time. Three days after the release, the Auschwitz commemoration was attended by more people than usual in protest. There was a lot of discussion, especially within the former resistance, which focused on the members of the group of nineteen.

Immediately following the debate, Teengs Gerritsen distanced himself from the group of nineteen. He said that he did not agree with everything in the letter and that his intention was solely to prevent further harm to the victims. Abel Herzberg, a Holocaust survivor and jurist who had been an advocate for release, began to have doubts afterwards:

"When I returned from Bergen-Belsen, when I came home, our three children were still alive. That joy wipes away so much misery... But what if you had come home and your children were no longer alive? How could you ever get over that? For those people, this release is unbearable, isn't it? That's why I don't know if this was the right thing to do. I don't know if I was right with all my talking."

== See also ==
- Rudolf Hess, German war criminal imprisoned in Germany until his suicide in 1987
- Herbert Kappler, German war criminal imprisoned in Italy until his escape in 1977
- Erich Koch, German war criminal imprisoned in Poland until his death in 1986
- Walter Reder, Austrian war criminal imprisoned in Italy until 1985
