= Ferdinand aus der Fünten =

German SS officer and war criminal

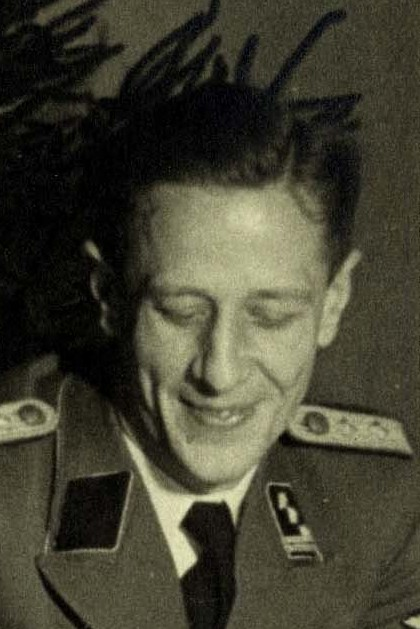
- Aus der Fünten in 1942
- Born: 17 December 1909; Mülheim, German Empire
- Died: 19 April 1989 (aged 79); Duisburg, North Rhine-Westphalia, West Germany
- Military career
- Allegiance: Nazi Germany
- Known for: One of the Breda Four

Ferdinand Hugo aus der Fünten (17 December 1909 – 19 April 1989), widely known as Fünten, was an SS-Hauptsturmführer and head of the Central Office for Jewish Emigration in Amsterdam during the Second World War. He was responsible for the deportation of Jews from the Netherlands to the German concentration camps and was convicted as a war criminal.

== Life ==
A native of Mülheim in the Ruhr, in the early years of Nazi Germany Fünten was employed in the Jewish section of the Reich Security Main Office, under the command of Adolf Eichmann. After the occupation of the Netherlands by German troops, Fünten became head of the Central Office for Jewish Emigration in Amsterdam. In this capacity, he was subordinate to the commander of the Sicherheitspolizei and the SD in The Hague. As head of the Central Office for Jewish Emigration, he organized the registration and arrest of Dutch Jews. Those arrested were taken to the Westerbork transit camp and deported to concentration and extermination camps in German-occupied Poland. Among those deported were sick and insane Jews from Amsterdam and Apeldoorn. Fünten threatened Jews who had married non-Jews with deportation, in order to force their sterilization. He held the rank of Hauptsturmführer in the SS in 1941.

After the war, Fünten was brought to trial for war crimes and on 12 July 1950 was sentenced to death by the Netherlands. His sentence was commuted to life in prison on 4 January 1951 due to Queen Juliana's refusal to sign his death warrant. He was imprisoned at Breda Prison with Willy Lages, Joseph Kotalla, and Franz Fischer as one of "The Breda Four", the only German war criminals of the Second World War to be imprisoned in the Netherlands. Lages was released in 1966 due to serious illness, dying in 1971. Kotalla died in prison in 1979.

During the 1960s, discussions started about whether the remaining prisoners should be set free, since the "Breda Four" were the only German war criminals still in captivity in the Netherlands. Politicians who favoured releasing them were met with staunch opposition from the people of the Netherlands. In 1988, the Dutch government under Prime Minister Ruud Lubbers decided to release Fischer and Fünten. The news led to mass demonstrations against the decision and to emotional debates. However, the two men were released on 27 January 1989 and deported to Germany. On 19 April 1989, shortly after his release, Ferdinand aus der Fünten died at Duisburg.
