= Theo van Schaik =

Dutch politician (1917–1987)

- Theo van Schaik in 1972

Member of the House of Representatives
- In office 23 February 1967 – 1 June 1976

Personal details
- Born: Theodorus Edgar Emiel van Schaik; 10 December 1917 Maarssen, Netherlands
- Died: 16 February 1987 (aged 69) Rotterdam, Netherlands
- Party: PvdA (1946); KVP (1951–1980); CDA (1980–1987)
- Spouse: Johanna Geertruida Maria (Anny) Maas
- Children: 4
- Education: Utrecht University

Theodorus Edgar Emiel van Schaik (10 December 1917 – 16 February 1987) was a Dutch politician. From 1967 to 1976, he was a member of the Dutch House of Representatives for the Catholic People's Party (KVP), where he served as the KVP's justice spokesperson. After leaving the House of Representatives, Van Schaik became a member of the Council of State until his death in 1987.

== Biography ==
Theo van Schaik was born in Maarssen on 10 December 1917, the son of Antonius Johannes van Schaik and Henriëtte Euphrasie Minis. After completing his secondary education in Utrecht, Van Schaik went on to study law at Utrecht University, where he obtained his degree in 1942 and his doctorate in 1948.

In 1946, Van Schaik ran for a seat in the municipal council of Maarssen as a member of the Labour Party (PvdA). In 1951, he joined the Catholic People's Party (KVP). From 1954 to 1967, Van Schaik was a member of the municipal council in Maarssen for the KVP.

Van Schaik became a member of the House of Representatives in 1967. As an MP, he was the KVP's justice spokesperson. He was a part of the party's progressive "Christian radical" faction during this period, but remained in the KVP in March 1968 after many within the faction left to form the Political Party of Radicals (PPR). In 1970, Van Schaik signed an open letter to the leadership of the KVP, Anti-Revolutionary Party (ARP), and Christian Historical Union (CHU) calling for the formation of a united, progressive, Christian democratic party. During the parliamentary debate on the Breda Three in 1972, Van Schaik was replaced as KVP spokesperson by Wiel Bremen after Van Schaik had faced personal threats.

Culturally, Van Schaik was more conservative; for instance, being politically opposed to pornography and promiscuity more generally. In 1975, Van Schaik, together with ARP MP Hannie van Leeuwen, later taken over by Til Gardeniers-Berendsen, submitted a bill regarding abortion that attempted to find a legal middle ground between the protection of human life as an "essential evangelical mandate" and the large parts of the Dutch population that wanted to expand the right to abortion. It was withdrawn after an alternative proposal from the PvdA and the People's Party for Freedom and Democracy (VVD) was passed in 1976.

In 1976, Van Schaik left the House to become a member of the Dutch Council of State. As a member of the Council of State, he served as chairman of the Welfare, Public Health and Culture division.

Van Schaik was married to Johanna Geertruida Maria "Anny" Maas, with whom he had three sons and one daughter.

Van Schaik died on 16 February 1987 in Rotterdam.
