= Frans Alphons Maria Alting von Geusau =

Dutch legal scholar and diplomat

Jonkheer Frans Alting von Geusau
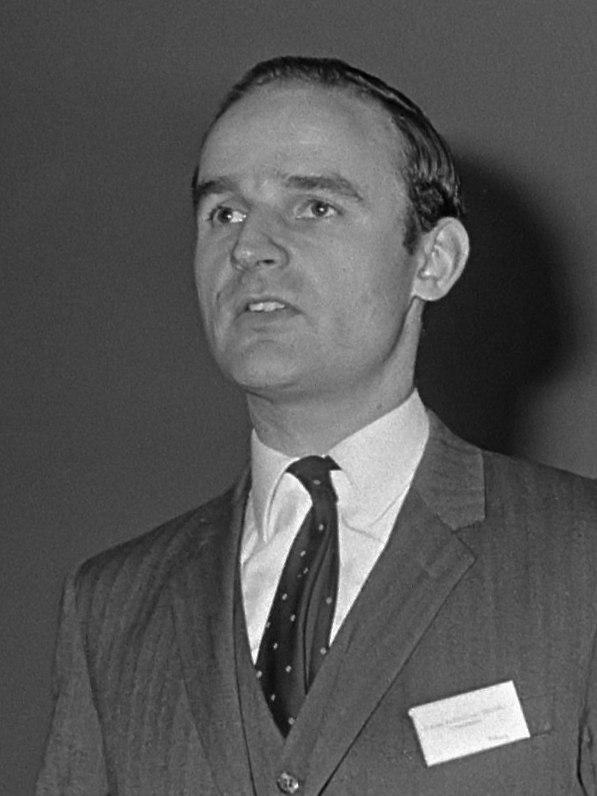
- Alting von Geusau (1969)
- Born: Frans Alphons Maria Alting von Geusau; Bilthoven

Academic background
- Education: Leiden University (LLM, PhD); College of Europe (LLM)
- Thesis: European Organizations and Foreign Relations of States: A Comparative Analysis of Decision-Making (1962)
- Doctoral advisor: Ivo Samkalden

Academic work
- Discipline: Public international law
- Institutions: Catholic University of Brabant

Frans Alphons Maria Alting von Geusau (born 26 June 1933 in Bilthoven) is a Dutch legal scholar and diplomat.

He has a law degree from the Leiden University and attended the College of Europe 1958-1959. He earned a doctorate in 1962, and founded the Dutch program of youth volunteers (Jongeren Vrijwilligers Programma) the following year.

He was Professor of International Law at the University of Tilburg from 1965 to 1998. He has been a visiting professor at MIT, Harvard University, the University of Cambridge and the University of Michigan.

He was also an advisor on international law and diplomat for the Dutch government. He was Vice President of the European Cultural Foundation from 1984 to 1992, and has been active within Aid to the Church in Need.

== Works ==
- Economic relations after the Kennedy Round. 1969
- The Lome convention and a new international economic order. 1969
- The Future of the international monetary system. 1970
- European perspectives on world order. 1975
- Uncertain détente. 1979
- The Pacific Rim and the Western world: strategic, economic, and cultural perspectives. 1987
- Beyond containment and division : Western cooperation from a post-totalitarian perspective. 1992
- Realism and moralism in international relations: essays in honor of Frans A.M. Alting von Geusau. 1998
- Cultural Diplomacy: waging war by other means? 2009
- The Illusions of Détente. 2009
- Western Cooperation. Origins and History. 2009
- European Unification into the Twenty First Century: Fading, Failing, Fragile? 2012
