= Ivo Samkalden =

Dutch politician (1912–1995)

His Excellency Ivo Samkalden
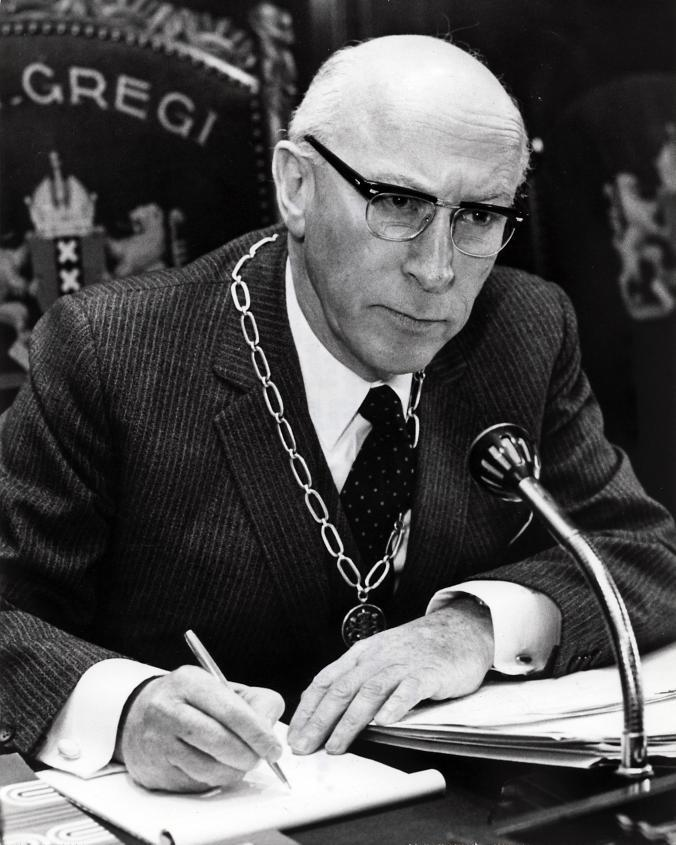
- Samkalden in 1972

Mayor of Amsterdam
- In office 1 August 1967 – 1 June 1977
- Preceded by: P. J. Koets (Ad interim)
- Succeeded by: Louis Kuijpers (Ad interim)

Minister of the Interior
- In office 31 August 1966 – 5 September 1966; Ad interim
- Prime Minister: Jo Cals
- Preceded by: Jan Smallenbroek
- Succeeded by: Koos Verdam

Member of the Senate
- In office 20 September 1960 – 14 April 1965
- Parliamentary group: Labour Party

Member of the House of Representatives
- In office 20 March 1959 – 1 September 1960
- Parliamentary group: Labour Party

Minister of Justice
- In office 14 April 1965 – 22 November 1966
- Prime Minister: Jo Cals
- Preceded by: Ynso Scholten
- Succeeded by: Teun Struycken
- In office 13 October 1956 – 22 December 1958
- Prime Minister: Willem Drees
- Preceded by: Julius Christiaan van Oven
- Succeeded by: Teun Struycken

Personal details
- Born: Ivo Samkalden; 10 August 1912 Rotterdam, Netherlands
- Died: 11 May 1995 (aged 82) Amsterdam, Netherlands
- Party: Labour Party (from 1946)
- Spouse: Olga Judith Meijers (m. 1938)
- Children: 3 sons and 1 daughter
- Relatives: Eduard Meijers (father-in-law)
- Occupation: Politician · Civil servant · Jurist · Professor

Academic background
- Education: Leiden University (LLM, PhD)
- Thesis: Het college van gedelegeerden uit den Volksraad (1938)
- Doctoral advisors: Jaap Schrieke
- Influences: Cornelis van Vollenhoven

Academic work
- Discipline: Public international law; European law
- Institutions: University of Wageningen; Leiden University
- Doctoral students: Frans Alphons Maria Alting von Geusau
- Notable students: Richard Lauwaars

Ivo Samkalden (10 August 1912 – 11 May 1995) was a Dutch politician of the Labour Party (PvdA) and jurist. He was granted the honorary title of Minister of State on 22 January 1985.

== Biography ==
Samkalden applied at the Leiden University in June 1930 majoring in Law and obtaining a Bachelor of Laws degree in July 1932 before graduating with a Master of Laws degree on 31 January 1936 and worked as a researcher at the Leiden University and later got a doctorate as a Doctor of Law on 11 March 1938. Samkalden worked as a civil servant for the Ministry of Colonial Affairs in Batavia in the Dutch East Indies from September 1938 until April 1942. In April 1942 Samkalden was arrested and detained in the Japanese internment camp Batu Lintang. Samkalden was transferred to the five different internment camps during the Japanese occupation and was detained until September 1945. Following the end of World War II Samkalden moved to Surabaya but was arrested during the Indonesian National Revolution. Samkalden was released on 13 November 1945 and moved back to the Netherlands and worked as civil servant for the Ministry of Justice from September 1946 until June 1947. Samkalden worked as a researcher and associate professor of Constitutional law at the Leiden University June 1947 until February 1948. Samkalden worked as a civil servant for the Ministry of Agriculture, Fisheries and Food Supplies as Director-General of the department for Legal Affairs from February 1948 until May 1952 and worked as a professor of Agricultural law at the Wageningen Agricultural College from May 1952 until October 1956. Samkalden served on the Provincial-Council of Gelderland from July 1954 until October 1956.

After the election of 1956 Samkalden was appointed as Minister of Justice in the Cabinet Drees III, taking office on 13 October 1956. The Cabinet Drees III fell on 11 December 1958 and continued to serve in a demissionary capacity until it was replaced by the caretaker Cabinet Beel II on 22 December 1958. Samkalden was elected as a Member of the House of Representatives after the election of 1959, taking office on 20 March 1959. Samkalden also became active in the public sector and worked as a professor of International relations and Leiden University from May 1959 until April 1965. After the Senate election of 1960 Samkalden was elected as a Member of the Senate, he resigned as a Member of the House of Representatives on 1 September 1960 and was installed as a Member of the Senate, taking office on 20 September 1960. On 27 February 1965 the Cabinet Marijnen fell and continued to serve in a demissionary capacity until the cabinet formation of 1965 when it was replaced by Cabinet Cals with Samkalden appointed again as Minister of Justice, taking office on 14 April 1965. Samkalden served as acting Minister of the Interior from 31 August 1966 until 5 September 1966 following the resignation of Jan Smallenbroek. The Cabinet Cals fell just one year later on 14 October 1966 and continued to serve in a demissionary capacity until it was replaced by the caretaker Cabinet Zijlstra on 22 November 1966. In December 1966 Samkalden announced that he wouldn't stand for the election of 1967. Samkalden remained in active politics, in July 1967 he was nominated as Mayor of Amsterdam, serving from 1 August 1967 until 1 June 1977.

Samkalden retired after spending 21 years in national politics but remained active in the public sector, occupying numerous seats as a nonprofit director on several boards of directors and supervisory boards (Carnegie Foundation, Organisation for Scientific Research, T.M.C. Asser Instituut, Anne Frank Foundation and the Royal Academy of Arts and Sciences) and served on several state commissions and councils on behalf of the government (Onderwijsraad, Probation Agency and the Raad voor Cultuur). Samkalden also served as a distinguished professor of Minority rights at the Leiden University holding the Cleveringa Chair from 1 September 1978 until 1 September 1979.

Samkalden was known for his abilities as a manager and policy wonk. Samkalden continued to comment on political affairs as a statesman until his death at the age of 82. He holds the distinction as the first Jewish Mayor of Amsterdam, however this did not prevent him from releasing notorious Nazi war criminal Willy Lages, one of the Breda Four, from his sentence of life in prison despite large public outcry.

== Decorations ==
Honours
Ribbon bar	Honour	Country	Date	Comment
	Grand Officer of the Order of Leopold II	Belgium	8 March 1957	
	Commander of the Order of Orange-Nassau	Netherlands	5 December 1966	Elevated from Officer (22 December 1958)
	Commander of the Order of the Netherlands Lion	Netherlands	1 June 1977	

Honorific Titles
Ribbon bar	Honour	Country	Date	Comment
	Minister of State	Netherlands	22 January 1985	Style of Excellency

Political offices
Preceded by Julius Christiaan van Oven	Minister of Justice; 1958–1958; 1965–1966	Succeeded by Teun Struycken
Preceded by Ynso Scholten	Minister of Justice; 1958–1958; 1965–1966	Succeeded by Teun Struycken
Preceded by Jan Smallenbroek	Minister of the Interior; Ad interim 1966	Succeeded by Koos Verdam
Preceded by P. J. Koets; Ad interim	Mayor of Amsterdam; 1983–1994	Succeeded by Louis Kuijpers; Ad interim
Civic offices
Unknown	Director-General of the Department for Legal Affairs of the Ministry of Agriculture, Fisheries and Food Supplies; 1948–1952	Unknown
Academic offices
Unknown	Distinguished Professor; Cleveringa Chair of the Leiden University; 1978–1979	Unknown
