= Central Agency for Jewish Emigration in Amsterdam =

Nazi Agency for deportation of Jews from the Netherlands during World War II

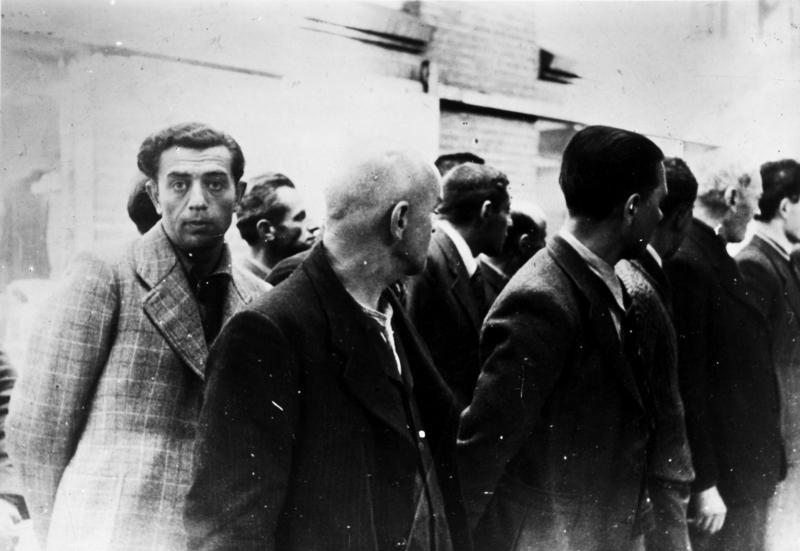
German Jewish emigrants detained in The Netherlands (1940)

The Central Agency for Jewish Emigration in Amsterdam (German: Zentralstelle für jüdische Auswanderung) was the Amsterdam branch of the Central Office for Jewish Emigration in Berlin. The office in Amsterdam organised the deportation of Jewish people from the Netherlands to Germany and Poland from 1941 to 1943.

== History ==
The Dutch Zentralstelle was founded on the orders of Reinhard Heydrich by request from Arthur Seyss-Inquart. Its founding was never officially proclaimed; the Zentralstelle didn't have its own stationery until August 1941. Jacques Presser wrote that the office would "serve as a model for the solution of the Jewish question" (die Finallösung der Judenfrage) in all European states under German rule. In addition to the Zentralstelle in Amsterdam, there were similar institutions in Vienna and Prague.

Soon after its founding, leadership of the Zentralstelle was given to Willy Lages by Wilhelm Harster, Befehlshaber der Sicherheitspolizei und des SD (Commander of the security police and the intelligence service). Lages replaced Hellmuth Reinhard, who was asked to leave after quarreling with members of the Jewish Council and with his superior. Lages's lieutenant was Ferdinand aus der Fünten.

During his trial after the war, Aus der Fünten stated that eight to ten German soldiers, about twelve German civilians, and 60–80 Dutch civilians worked at the office and reported to him.

Although affiliated with the Security Police (SiPo) and SD located on Euterpestraat, its offices were located in the school opposite on Adama van Scheltemaplein.

== Goals ==
The Zentralstelle was assigned three tasks:

1. The registration of all Jews;
2. The monitoring of Jewish life;
3. The central control of emigration.

The Zentralstelle only began to engage in large-scale activities after the issuance of the "Order regarding the appearance of Jews in public" by Hanns Albin Rauter on 15 September 1941. On 3 February 1942, the directive of the Zentralstelle was changed to:

1. The control of Jewish life (issue of orders to the Jewish Council, Jewish organizations, training, welfare, work deployment, and weekly newspaper)
2. The implementation of the order regarding the appearance of Jews in public (detailed determination of location and time restrictions, monitoring of labeling, admission to public institutions and events, and moving permits)
3. The preparation for the Final Solution (smuggling through the Central Office for Jewish Emigration, resettlement operations, Westerbork camp, and preparation of the resettlement)

With this assignment, the Zentralstelle became the most important operator of the Holocaust in the Netherlands.

The implementation of German measures against the Jewish population in Amsterdam was assigned to the Jewish Affairs Office on 1 June 1942, which remained active until 8 May 1943, when the majority of the Jews had already been deported.
