= Franz Fischer (SS officer) =

German convicted war criminal

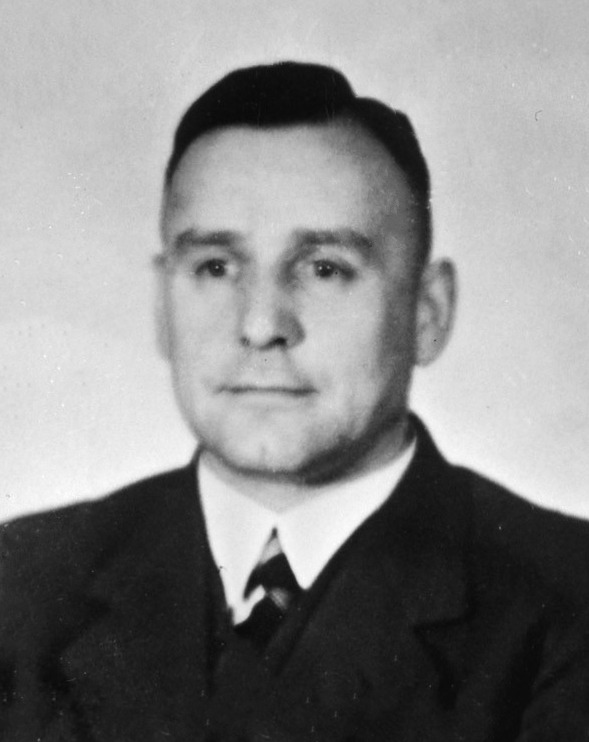
- Born: 10 December 1901; Bigge, Olsberg, Germany
- Died: 19 September 1989 (aged 87); Bigge, Olsberg, Germany
- Military career
- Allegiance: Nazi Germany

not to be confused with Franz Joseph Emil FischerFranz Fischer (10 December 1901 – 19 September 1989) was a German Sturmscharführer during the Second World War. From November 1940, he was in practice in charge of Referat IV in The Hague, Netherlands. In this capacity, he was responsible for the deportation of 13,000 Jews.

After the war, he was sentenced to death in the Netherlands for war crimes, with a later commutation to life imprisonment. From 1960, he was among the four last German war criminals in prison in the Netherlands, collectively known as the Breda Four. Several clemency requests were rejected, after proposals to release them were met with opposition in parliament and society. In January 1989, Fischer was released and he died the same year.
