= Johann Friedrich Stöver =

German SS officer and camp commander (1899–1981)

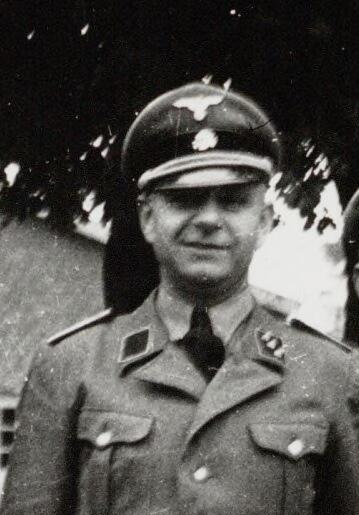
- Stöver in 1943

SS Schutzhaftlagerführer
- Succeeded by: Office abolished

Personal details
- Born: 9 August 1899 Bremen, German Empire
- Died: 1981 (aged 81–82) Bremen, Germany
- Party: Nazi Party (NSDAP)
- Conviction(s): War crimes
- Criminal penalty: Imprisonment
- SS service
- Allegiance: Nazi Germany
- Branch: Schutzstaffel
- Rank: Schutzhaftlagerführer
- Nicknames: "Nelis" for prisoners, "Hans", for colleagues
- Commands: SS-Schutzhaftlagerführer I in Kamp Amersfoort concentration camp
- Conflicts: World War II

Johann Friedrich (Hans) Stöver (Bremen, German Empire, 9 August 1899 – Bremen, Germany 1981) was a German camp commander.

During World War II Stöver was SS-Schutzhaftlagerführer I in Kamp Amersfoort concentration camp. He was second in command under Lagerkommandant, SS-Obersturmführer Walter Heinrich.

Stöver had previously been SS-Untersturmführer and Kriminalsekretär of Kamp Schoorl concentration camp and was known as a notoriously cruel man. Nicknamed "de Blaffer" ("the Barker"), he took pleasure in entering the barracks at night, "roaring" at the prisoners. In Kamp Amersfoort he was often in charge, because Heinrich regularly stayed outside the camp. He was 'trained' by two SS men from Dachau concentration camp, who were transferred by Heinrich to 'teach the guards how to deal with the prisoners'. According to a witness statement, Stöver killed at least one Soviet-prisoner of war with his own hands, by smashing his brains in with a piece of firewood. In addition, he confiscated food intended for the prisoners, in favor of the camp leaders. He was commander of a firing squad that shot detainees without trial. During his absence Stöver was often replaced with the notoriously sadistic SS-Unter-Schutzhaftlagerführer Josef Johann Kotalla. When Lagerkommandant Heinrich left the camp in 1943, it wasn't Stöver, but SS-Schutzhaftlagerführer II Karl Peter Berg, who succeeded him as Lagerkommandant, after which Stöver disappeared from the scene.

On 7 June 1949, Stöver was sentenced to life imprisonment by the Amsterdam Bijzonder Gerechtshof court. He was detained in Breda. In 1950 he was sentenced to death by the Bijzonder Gerechtshof court of Cassation, but a year later this sentence was commuted to life. In May 1959, the life sentence was changed to 23 years and four months. In November 1960, Stöver was released, after which he returned to Germany.

In 1974 Stöver filed a lawsuit over the loss of his civil servant pension.

== See also ==
- German atrocities committed against Soviet prisoners of war
