= Karl Peter Berg =

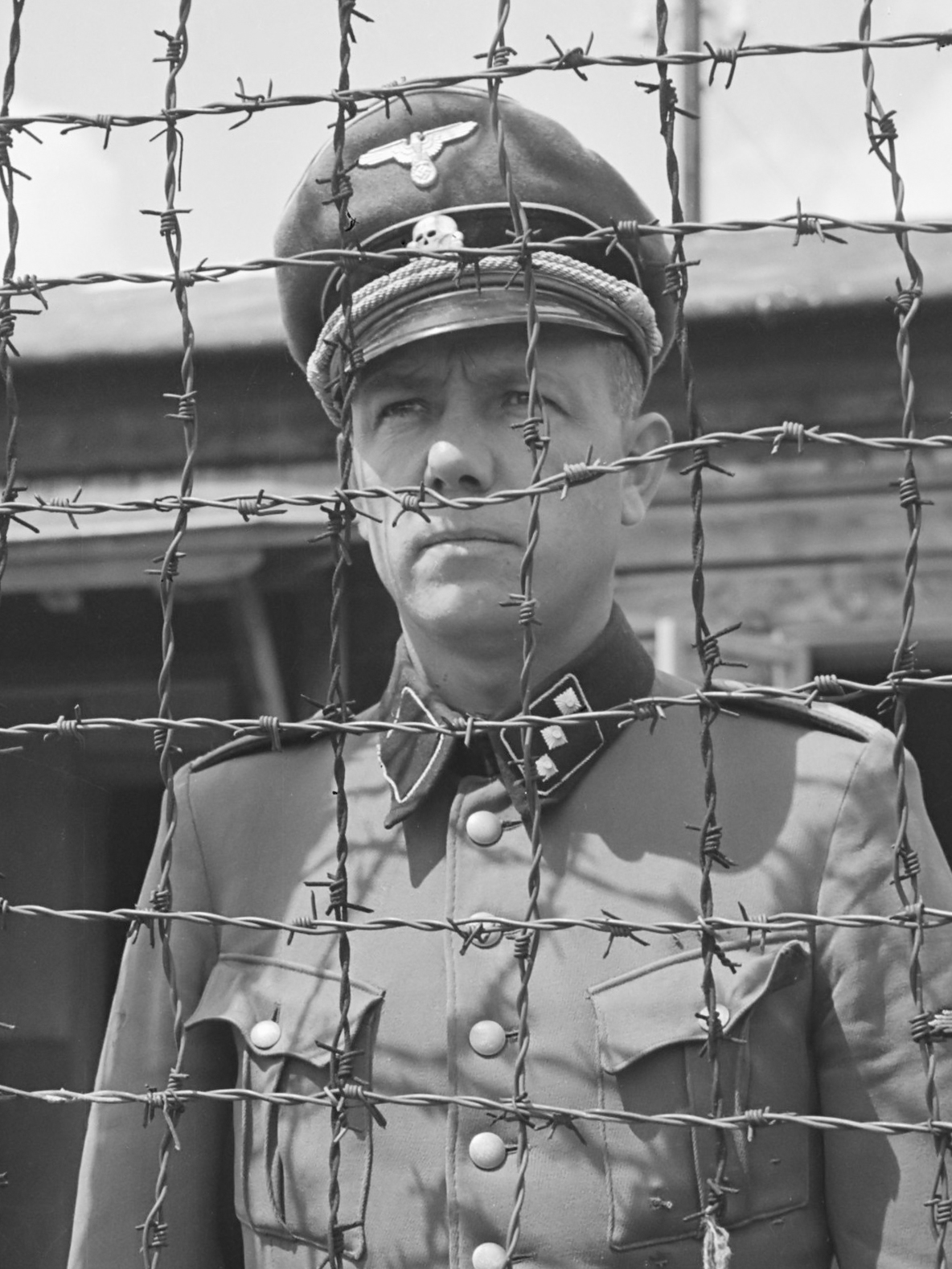
- ex-commander Karl Peter Berg in Kamp Amersfoort internment camp (1945)

SS-Schutzhaftlagerführer Kamp Amersfoort concentration camp
- In office June 1941 – 12 May 1945

Personal details
- Born: 18 April 1907 Bad Honnef, German Empire
- Died: 22 November 1949 (aged 42) Weesperkarspel, The Netherlands
- Cause of death: Execution by firing squad
- Party: Nazi Party (NSDAP)
- Conviction(s): War crimes

Karl Peter Berg (18 April 1907 – 22 November 1949) was a German camp commander, who was sentenced to death after World War II for war crimes committed during the German occupation of the Netherlands.

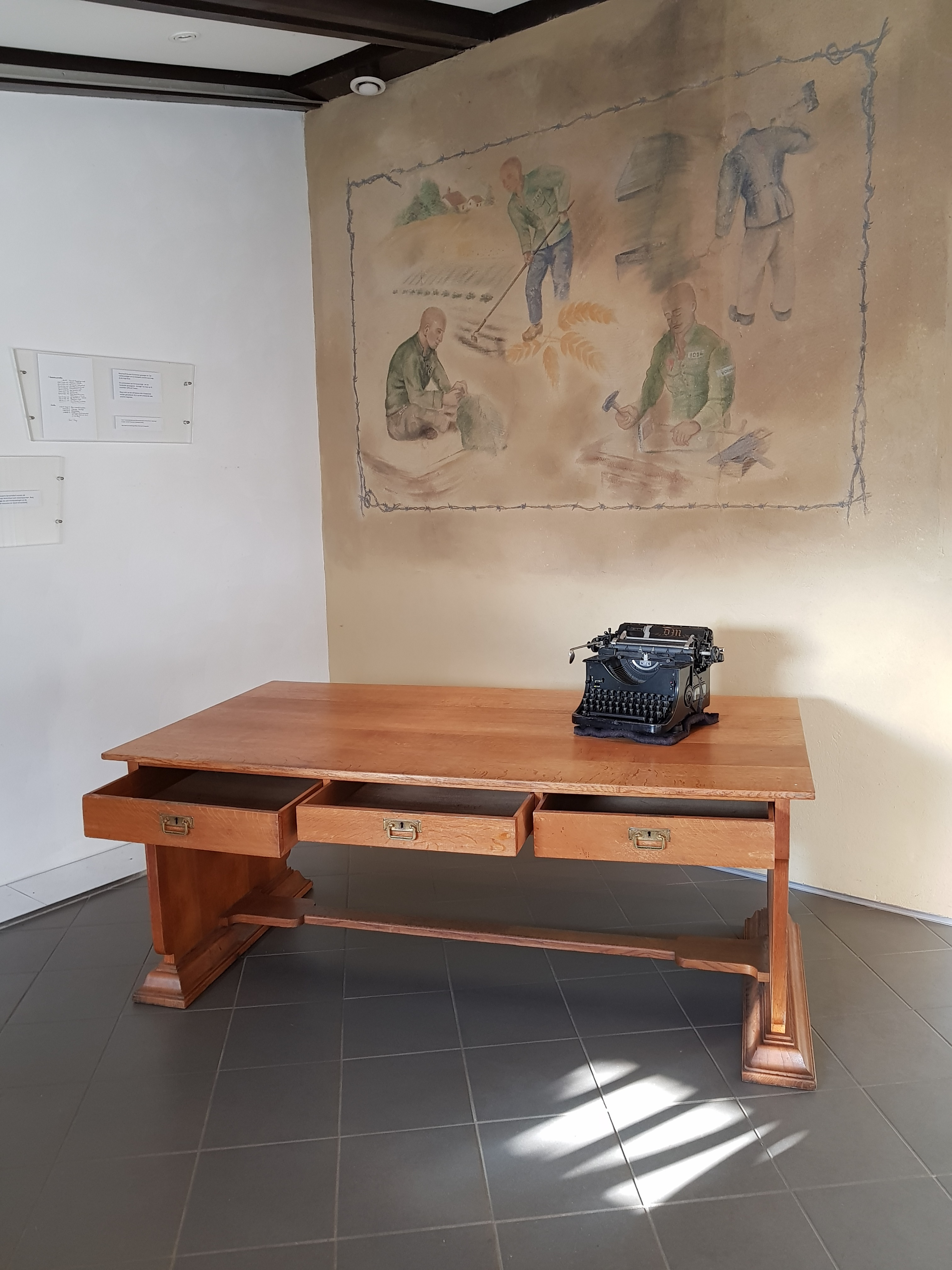
The office of camp commander Karl Peter Berg (1907–1949) in the former Kamp Amersfoort concentration camp

During World War II he was a member of the SS, the military branch of the German Nazi Party, with the rank of SS-Hauptscharführer. From June 1941 until its abolition in October 1941 he was commander of Kamp Schoorl concentration camp.

Later on Berg came to Kamp Amersfoort concentration camp and became Schutzhaftlagerführer II (second deputy commander) under SS-Obersturmführer Walter Heinrich. Due to Heinrich's illness, he was soon appointed as Stellvertretener Schutzhaftlagerführer (deputy commander) and in 1943 he succeeded Heinrich as Lagerkommandant. Berg rarely involved himself in atrocities in Kamp Schoorl, but in Amersfoort he frequently mistreated prisoners himself. The no less infamous SS-Unter-Schutzhaftlagerführer Joseph Kotalla acted as his deputy. Berg was involved in the execution of 77 Soviet POWs and about 200 other prisoners. Under his leadership, the living conditions of the prisoners were very bad, both due to the abuse and the food rations that were far too small.

Berg fled to Scheveningen on 20 April 1945, but was arrested. In 1949 he was sentenced to death; a pardon was rejected. When he was executed in 1949, he himself was the first to – unexpectedly – shout the command 'fire' against the firing squad in Fort Bijlmer in Weesperkarspel.

Berg was buried in an anonymous grave at De Nieuwe Noorder cemetery in Amsterdam. His uniform boots as well as the camp commander's original desk are exhibited in the National Monument Kamp Amersfoort since 2018.

== See also ==
- German atrocities committed against Soviet prisoners of war
