= Andries Jan Pieters =

Dutch war criminal

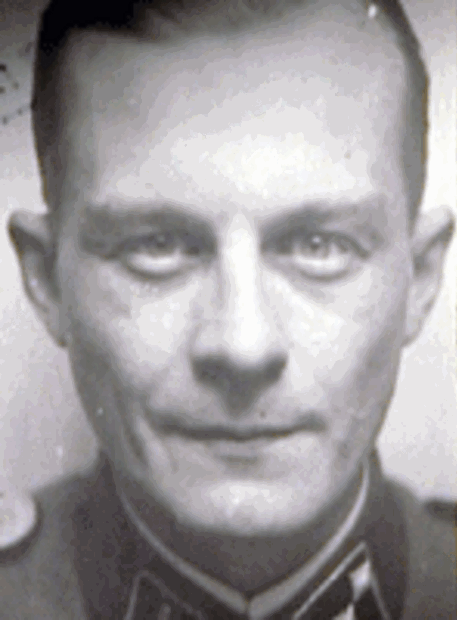
Andries Jan Pieters

Andries Jan Pieters (2 August 1916 – 21 March 1952) was a Dutch war criminal and, together with Artur Albrecht, was one of the last two people to be executed in the Netherlands. Pieters served as a volunteer for Nazi Germany on the Eastern Front. When he was wounded he returned to the Netherlands and in the final months of World War II he led an SS commando in the Netherlands, which tortured and executed resistance members and others.

== Early life ==
Pieters was born in 1916 in Leksula, Eastern Dutch East Indies, as the son of a Protestant missionary. Pieters was frustrated during his childhood as he was not allowed to play with native Indonesian children. His father was stern and was recalled to the Netherlands due to mismanagement. In 1924 the family returned to the Netherlands and settled in Groningen. His father started a furniture shop, which went bankrupt after a while. Pieters claimed this was caused by "Jewpeople". After failing at school, Pieters joined the armed forces of the Netherlands.

== World War II ==
In 1941, one year after the invasion of the Netherlands by Nazi Germany, Pieters joined the Vreemdelingenlegioen Nederland, a foreign volunteer force of the SS. He was sent to the Eastern Front. In a police-interview in 1947 Pieters said the reason he joined the Vreemdelingenlegioen was his upbringing, which he claimed made him fiercely anti-communist and therefore want to fight communism. Near the end of the war he was wounded. SS-leader Heinrich Himmler gave orders to small groups of SS-members to return to their home country and start a guerrilla war. These groups were under command of Otto Skorzeny. Himmler gave Pieters a carte blanche to do what he considered necessary. In early 1945 he joined the Jagdverband Nord/West in Neustrelitz. Pieters held the rank of Untersturmführer and commanded of a group of thirty men, which he there trained for secret fighting missions in the Netherlands. The group of men was known as Kommando Zeppelin or Kommando Steinbach, after the pseudonym of Pieters.

On 6 or 7 April the group of men took over control of Castle Groot Engelenburg in Brummen. The group captured dozens of resistance members and perceived resistance members, mainly due to information provided by local SS and SD officials. In the castle the group tortured their victims by hitting them with batons, preventing blood from reaching the genitals, putting out candles on bodies, hitting nails under toe and fingernails, poking with fire irons and rape. On 13 April 1945 the group left the castle when the Canadian armed forces were closing in on Brummen. Before leaving eight prisoners were shot to death and left in the castle pond.

Pieters and his group moved to the town of Loosdrecht, and took occupance in cafe-restaurant het Witte Huis. In Loosdrecht the group resumed its rounding up of (perceived) resistance members and tortured them. One prisoner died during the torture and another female captive died soon after the liberation of Loosdrecht. A total of 33 people were taken captive by the group, including a whole family of Jews who had been in hiding from the Nazis. The acts of the group were perceived to be so heinous that they were arrested by German police on 3 May 1945. The order to arrest them was given by either the highest SS-member in the Netherlands, Karl Eberhard Schöngarth, or Willy Lages, who was later sent to life imprisonment for war crimes himself. Either way, an argument arose between Pieters and Schöngarth, with Schöngarth ordering Pieters to stop his torture practices and disband his unit and Pieters refusing repeatedly because he had been given permission by Himmler. Schöngarth only ordered Pieters' arrest two weeks after the start of the argument. Two days after the group was arrested the German forces in the Netherlands surrendered.

Journalist Stijn Wiegerinck claims that Pieters would have been executed by the Germans for desertion.

== Trial and execution ==
In 1949 the trial of Pieters started. There were dozens of witnesses of both the torture and executions against Pieters. In June 1949 he was sentenced to death by the Bijzonder Gerechtshof of Amsterdam. An obligationary appeal was launched, with the main question surrounding the responsibility of Pieters regarding the executions. He admitted being involved in the torture but claimed the executions were carried out by his subordinates. A German SD officer was already sentenced as the prime suspect in the case of the executions. The Court of Appeal quashed the sentence by the Bijzonder Gerechtshof of Amsterdam. The case was reassigned to the Bijzonder Gerechtshof of Haarlem, there Pieters received a life sentence. The prosecutor appealed the sentence. The Court of Appeal was divided on the issue, with five for capital punishment and two for life imprisonment. In November 1951 the Court of Appeal sentenced him to death.

Pieters then sought a pardon by Queen Juliana. He claimed that his bad youth experiences and a misplaced sense of duty to fight against communism had motivated him. He saw it as part of angry psychosis. A pardon was regular practice, as of 154 death sentences only 39 were actually carried out, while 101 received a pardon. In 1951 there were only seven death sentences remaining to be discussed between the Queen and the Dutch minister of Justice, Hendrik Mulderije. Mulderije sought as many death penalties as possible while Queen Juliana sought the opposite. A compromise was made, with four receiving a pardon and two were to be executed, another case would be decided later. Pieters was to be executed, together with German Artur Albrecht.

In January 1952 the Dutch minister of Justice, Hendrik Mulderije, called the crimes committed by the group of Pieters to be among the worst during the German occupation. The Dutch judges called his crimes the most serious they had seen during all their cases after World War II.

On 20 March 1952 Pieters was informed of his execution the next day. He started a small prison riot, which could only be put down when his attorney calmed him down.

Pieters was executed, together with Albrecht, before a firing squad at the Waalsdorpervlakte on 21 March 1952, near The Hague. They were the last persons to be executed in the Netherlands.

== Personal life ==
Journalist Stijn Wiegerinck, who wrote the book Het commando-Pieters about Pieters and his actions called him a deeply frustrated man, citing a failure of projects gone wrong, a failed marriage and poor choices.
