= Walter Heinrich =

Nazi concentration camp commandant

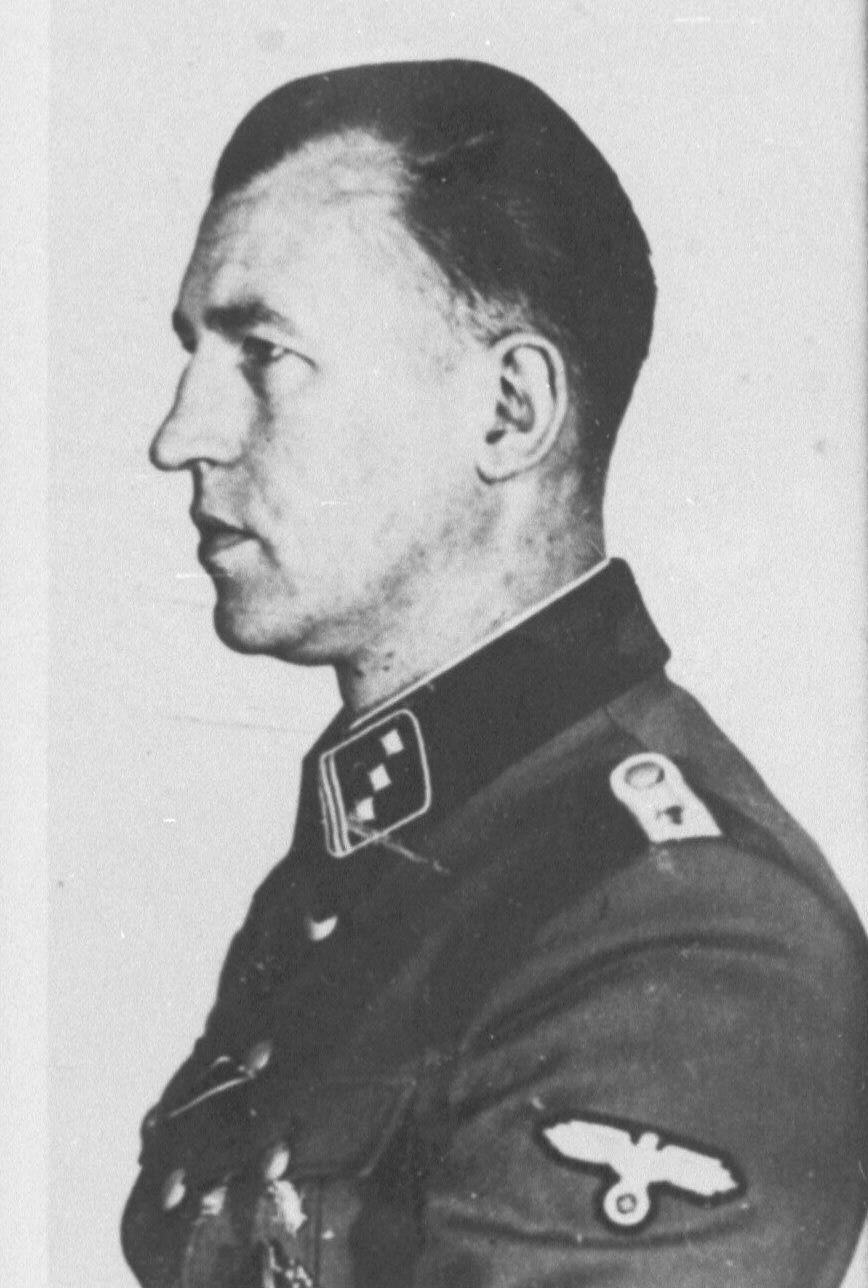
- SS-Obersturmführer Walter Heinrich

SS-Obersturmführer
- In office June 1941 – 12 May 1945
- Succeeded by: Office abolished

SS member
- In office 1933 – 12 May 1945
- Succeeded by: Office abolished

Gestapo
- In office 1939 – 12 May 1945
- Succeeded by: Office abolished

Personal details
- Born: 2 January 1910 Myslowitz, Silesia
- Died: unknown, missing since February 1945
- Party: Nazi Party (NSDAP)
- SS service
- Allegiance: Nazi Germany
- Branch: Schutzstaffel
- Service years: 1933–1945
- Rank: SS-Obersturmführer
- Nickname: "Knipperoog" ("Blinking Eye")
- Units: SS-Wachbataillon Nordwest, first company in charge of Kamp Amersfoort concentration camp
- Commands: Kamp Amersfoort
- Conflicts: World War II

Walter Heinrich (Myslowitz, German Empire, 2 January 1910 – unknown, missing since February 1945) was a German SS-Obersturmführer. As such, from August 1941 to 1 March 1943, he was in charge of Kamp Amersfoort concentration camp as Lagerkommandant.

Heinrich, son of a train driver, was born on 2 January 1910 in Myslowitz, a town in Silesia, Germany, that after the referendum of 1921 came to be in Poland. Heinrich's family then left for German territory. From 1928 he worked as a municipal official in Oppeln. After the assumption of power from Hitler, in 1933, Heinrich became a member of the NSDAP and the SS. In January 1939 he got a job with the Gestapo. He took part in the Invasion of Poland and was transferred to the Reichssicherheitshauptamt in Berlin.

In 1941 Heinrich arrived in the Netherlands, where as a 31-year-old Untersturmführer he became the first commander of Kamp Amersfoort concentration camp. Heinrich appointed twenty SS men as Wachkommando of the camp, and released two SS men from the Dachau concentration camp to demonstrate how the guards should deal with the prisoners. Heinrich forbade assaults when he saw them, but was often outside the camp, where Schutzhaftlagerführer I Johann Friedrich Stöver took over the leadership. From the Memoirs of Prisoners and Post-War Official Reports it is revealed that he was a dog lover, party goer, former figure skater and scumbag. He seemed correct in his handling and his blinking eye, a nervous tic, earned him the nickname "Heinrich Knipperoog" ("Heinrich Blinking Eye"). He organized dinners for befriended officers, for which he used pressed food that was actually intended for the prisoners. Heinrich was not only responsible for the many abuses in Amersfoort concentration camp, but also took an active part in the execution of 77 Soviet prisoners of war on 9 April 1944.

During Heinrich's time as camp commander, 325 prisoners died from execution, beatings, starvation and forced labour. When Heinrich left the camp on 1 March 1943, he was succeeded by SS-Schutzhaftlagerführer II Karl Peter Berg as Lagerkommandant. Heinrich was transferred to the Gestapo headquarters in The Hague, where he worked as an inspector of the concentration camps on Dutch soil. Heinrich was never tried for his war crimes, because he disappeared without a trace in February 1945 and - despite an international search report - was never found. According to the National Monument Kamp Amersfoort, incorrect personal data appear to have been used in his post-war investigation and extradition requests.

His actions in the last year of the Second World War were unclear for a long time. The makers of the podcast, The Disappeared SS'er, discovered in 2022 that he left to The Hague on a secret assignment. Researcher Floris van Dijk of the National Monument Kamp Amersfoort and podcast maker Jordy Hubers discovered that he was going to work there for the Sicherheitsdienst, the secret service of the NSDAP. An internal document shows that Heinrich was given the task to select prisoners who were to be sent to Natzweiler-Struthof concentration camp. Of the 600 Dutch resistance fighters that Heinrich selected, 300 were killed there.

== See also ==
- German atrocities committed against Soviet prisoners of war
