= Kamp Schoorl =

German concentration camp in the Netherlands

Kamp Schoorl Polizeiliches Durchgangslager Schoorl
- Concentration camp
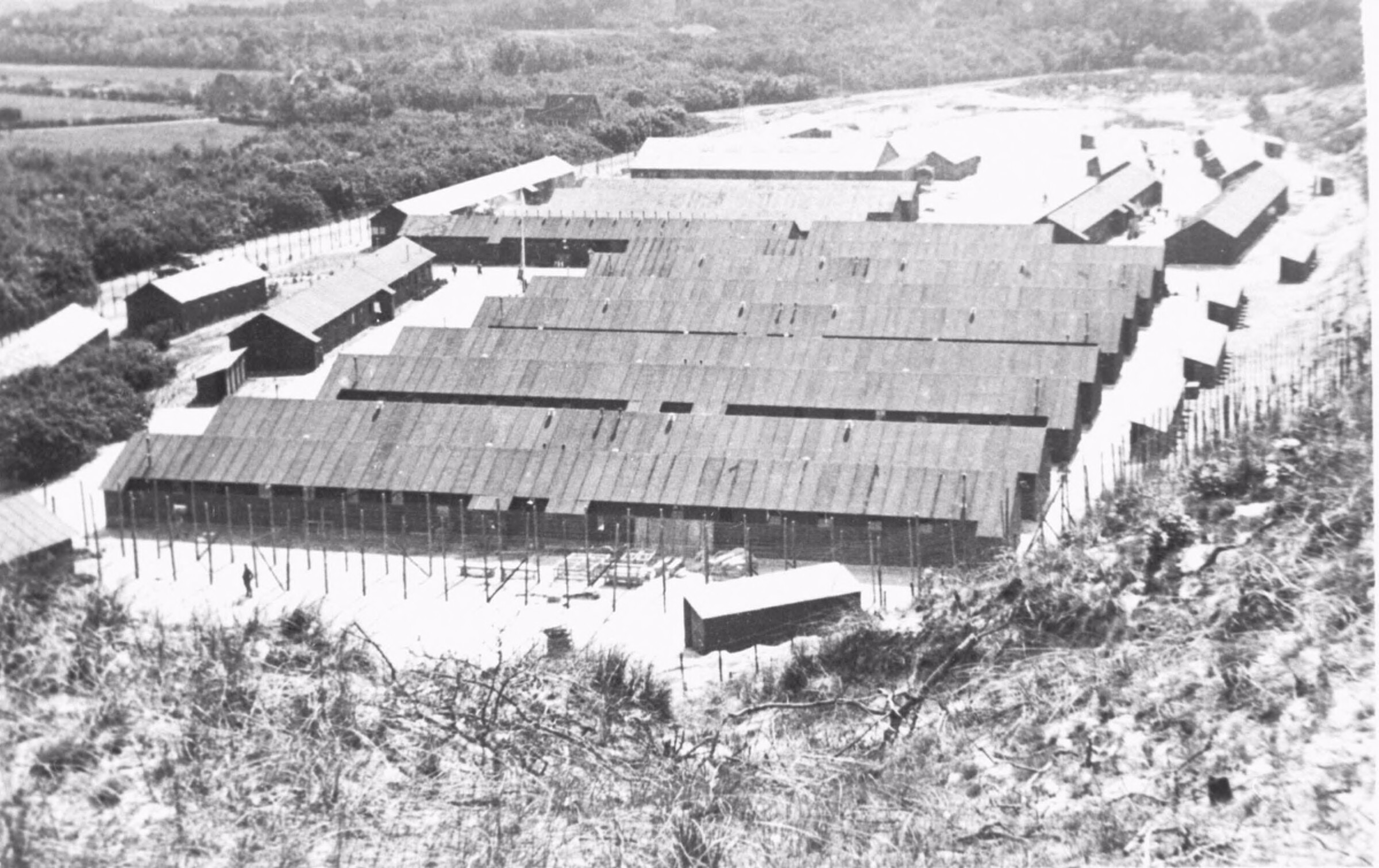
- Kamp Schoorl during the Second World War

- Location of the camp in the Netherlands
- Coordinates: 52°42′18″N 4°41′9.60″E
- Other names: Polizeiliches Durchgangslager Schoorl
- Location: Schoorl, Netherlands
- Built by: Dutch army
- Operated by: SS
- Original use: Army camp
- First built: 1939
- Operational: December 1940 - October 1941
- Notable books: Het Kamp Schoorl by Albert Boer

Schoorl transit camp (Dutch: Kamp Schoorl, German: Polizeiliches Durchgangslager Schoorl), originally a Dutch army camp (1939–1940), was a Nazi concentration camp (1940–1941) near the village of Schoorl in the Netherlands.

== History ==
Kamp Schoorl was built in 1939 as a Dutch army camp. Nazi Germany occupied the Netherlands from May 1940 until May 1945.

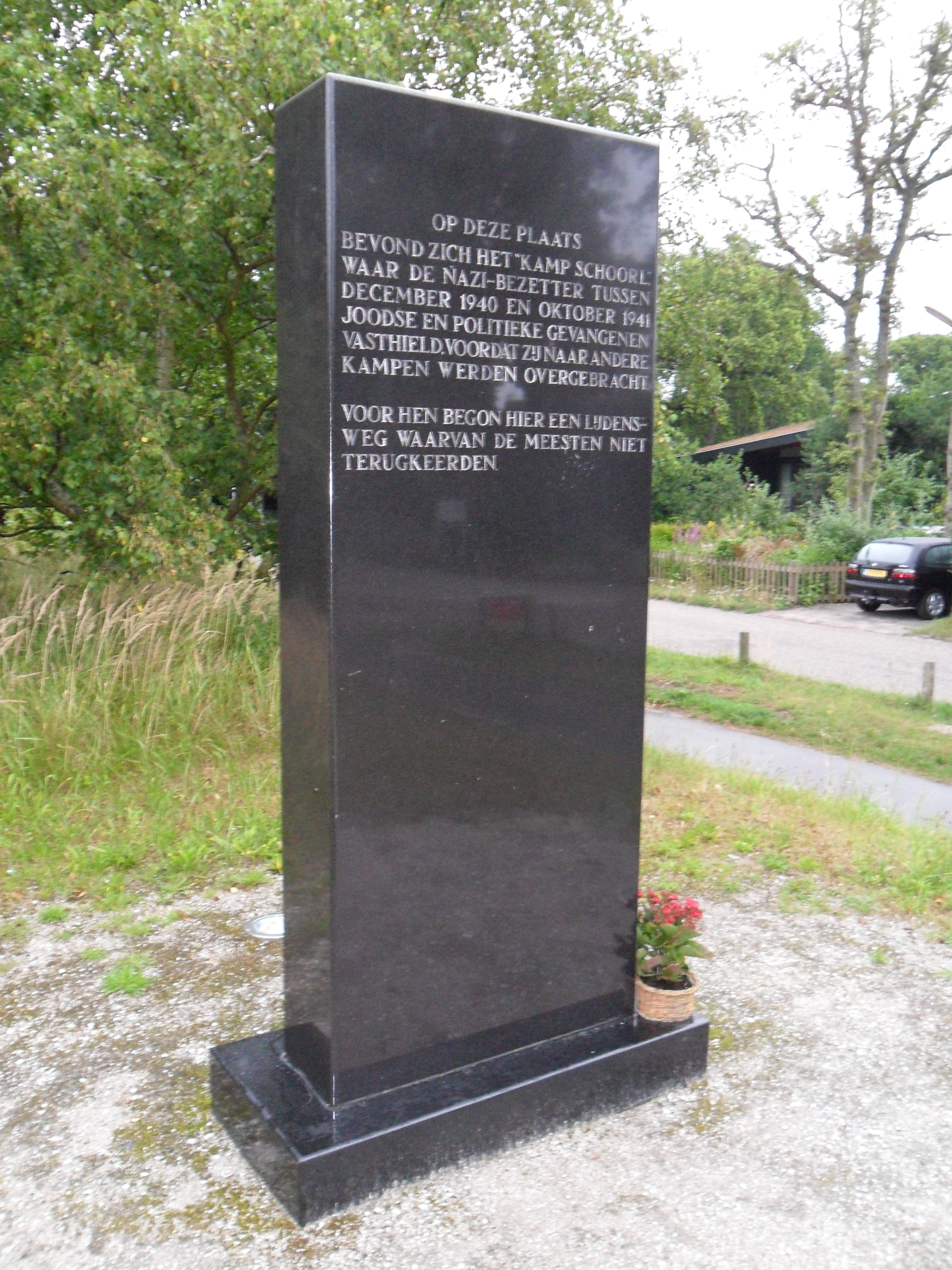
War memorial of Kamp Schoorl

Among the prisoners were people from The Netherlands, England, Belgium and France. After a few months the French and the Belgians were released. In September 1940 the English prisoners were transferred to a German camp in the Polish town of Toszek. The first Jews captured during the razzia (pogrom) of 22 and 23 February 1941 in Amsterdam (Jonas Daniël Meijerplein) were transferred to the camp in an army truck. The group of 425 people only stayed for four days after which they were transferred to Buchenwald concentration camp where in June 1941 they were again transferred to Mauthausen concentration camp. Only two of this group survived the war.

For about 1,900 people the camp was their first camp before being transferred to other camps. More than 1,000 of them never returned, mainly Jews and political prisoners.

The regime in the camp was mild compared to the other Dutch camps. There was no heavy labour and there was enough food.

In October 1941 the camp was closed by the Germans because the camp was too small and located between the dunes. It was not easy to enlarge it. Some of the prisoners were released, but most were transferred to Kamp Amersfoort, and 25 women were transported directly to Ravensbrück concentration camp.

Until the end of the war, militia of the Wehrmacht and the Organisation Todt used the camp as a base.

After the war the camp was used to imprison members of the National Socialist Movement in the Netherlands (NSB) and was finally demolished in 1950.

== Commanders ==
The first commander was SS-Untersturmführer Arnold Schmidt. He was succeeded by SS-Untersturmführer Johann Friedrich Stöver. SS-Untersturmführer Karl Peter Berg was camp commander from June 1941 until its closure in October 1941.

== Book ==
Het Kamp Schoorl is the title of a book in Dutch by Albert Boer, dealing with the history of Kamp Schoorl.
