= Ans van Dijk =

Dutch collaborator who betrayed Jews to Nazi Germany

- van Dijk in 1947
- Born: Anna van Dijk; 24 December 1905; Amsterdam, Netherlands
- Died: 14 January 1948 (aged 42); Fort Bijlmer, Weesperkarspel, Netherlands
- Known for: Collaboration
- Status: Executed by firing squad
- Conviction: Treason
- Penalty: Death

Details
- Victims: 84–700 (as an accomplice)
- Span of crimes: 1943–1945
- Country: Netherlands
- Targets: Jews and Partisans

Anna "Ans" van Dijk (24 December 1905 – 14 January 1948) was a Dutch collaborator who betrayed Jews to Nazi Germany during World War II. She is held responsible for the death of at least 84 people. She was the only Dutch woman to be executed for her wartime activities.

== Biography ==
Born in Amsterdam, Ans van Dijk was the daughter of Jewish parents Aron van Dijk and Kaatje Bin. She married Bram Querido in 1927, and they separated in 1935. After the marriage ended, she began a lesbian relationship with a woman named Miep Stodel, and opened a millinery shop called Maison Evany in Amsterdam. The shop was closed by the Nazis in 1941 as part of their seizure of Jewish property—Jews were forbidden to own businesses or work in retail shops, amongst other occupational restrictions. Stodel fled to Switzerland in 1942.

Van Dijk was arrested on Easter Sunday 1943 by the Sicherheitsdienst (SD; the Nazi intelligence service) detective Peter Schaap of the Office of Jewish Affairs of the Amsterdam police. After promising to work for the SD, van Dijk was released. Pretending to be a member of the resistance, she offered to help Jews find hiding places and obtain false papers. In this way, she trapped at least 145 people, including one of her own brothers and his family. Some 84 of her victims later died in concentration camps. She may have been responsible for the deaths of as many as 700 people. It has been suggested that she may have betrayed Anne Frank and her family, but there is no clear evidence to support this.

== Trial and execution ==
After the war, she was arrested at a friend's home in Rotterdam on 20 June 1945, and charged with 23 counts of treason. On 24 February 1947, she was tried before the Special Court in Amsterdam. She pleaded guilty on all counts, explaining that she only acted out of self-preservation. However, her superior, Willy Lages, had previously described van Dijk as eager to do her job, for which she was paid for every person she helped find. A request by her attorney for a psychiatric evaluation was refused by the Court. She was sentenced to death. She appealed the conviction, but in September 1947 the Special Court of Appeals confirmed her sentence. Her request for a royal pardon was rejected by Queen Wilhelmina.

On 14 January 1948 she was executed by firing squad at Fort Bijlmer in the Weesperkarspel municipality (now the Bijlmermeer district of the city of Amsterdam). The night before her execution she was baptized and joined the Catholic Church. She was the only woman to be executed in the Netherlands for crimes committed during the German occupation.
