= Algemeen Handelsblad =

Dutch newspaper

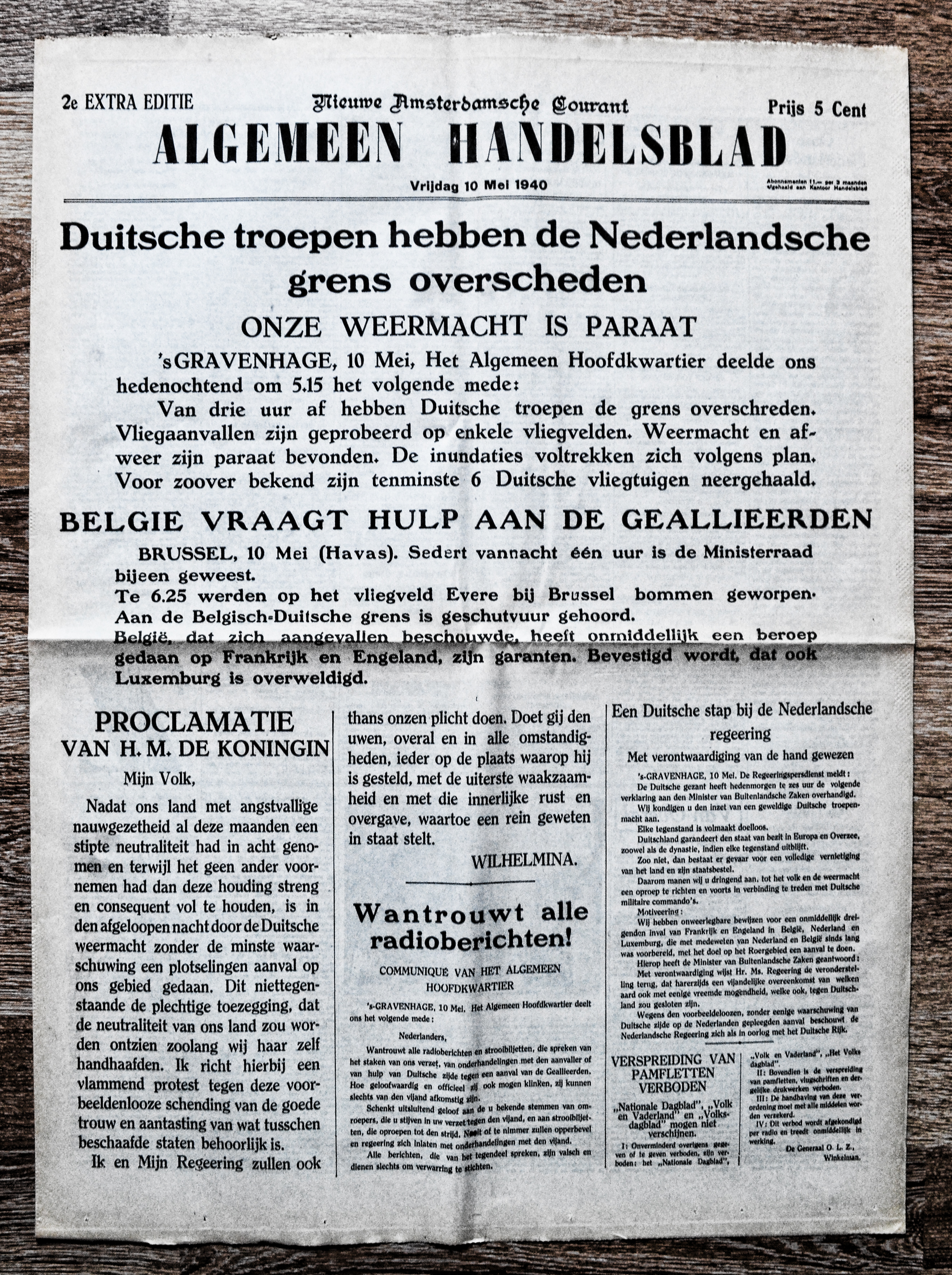
- Front page of Dutch daily newspaper "Algemeen Handelsblad" May 10, 1940. With headline: "German troops have crossed the Dutch border"
- Type: Daily newspaper
- Owner: Nederlandse Dagbladunie (1962–1970)
- Founded: 1828
- Ceased publication: 1 October 1970
- Political alignment: Liberal
- Language: Dutch
- Headquarters: Amsterdam

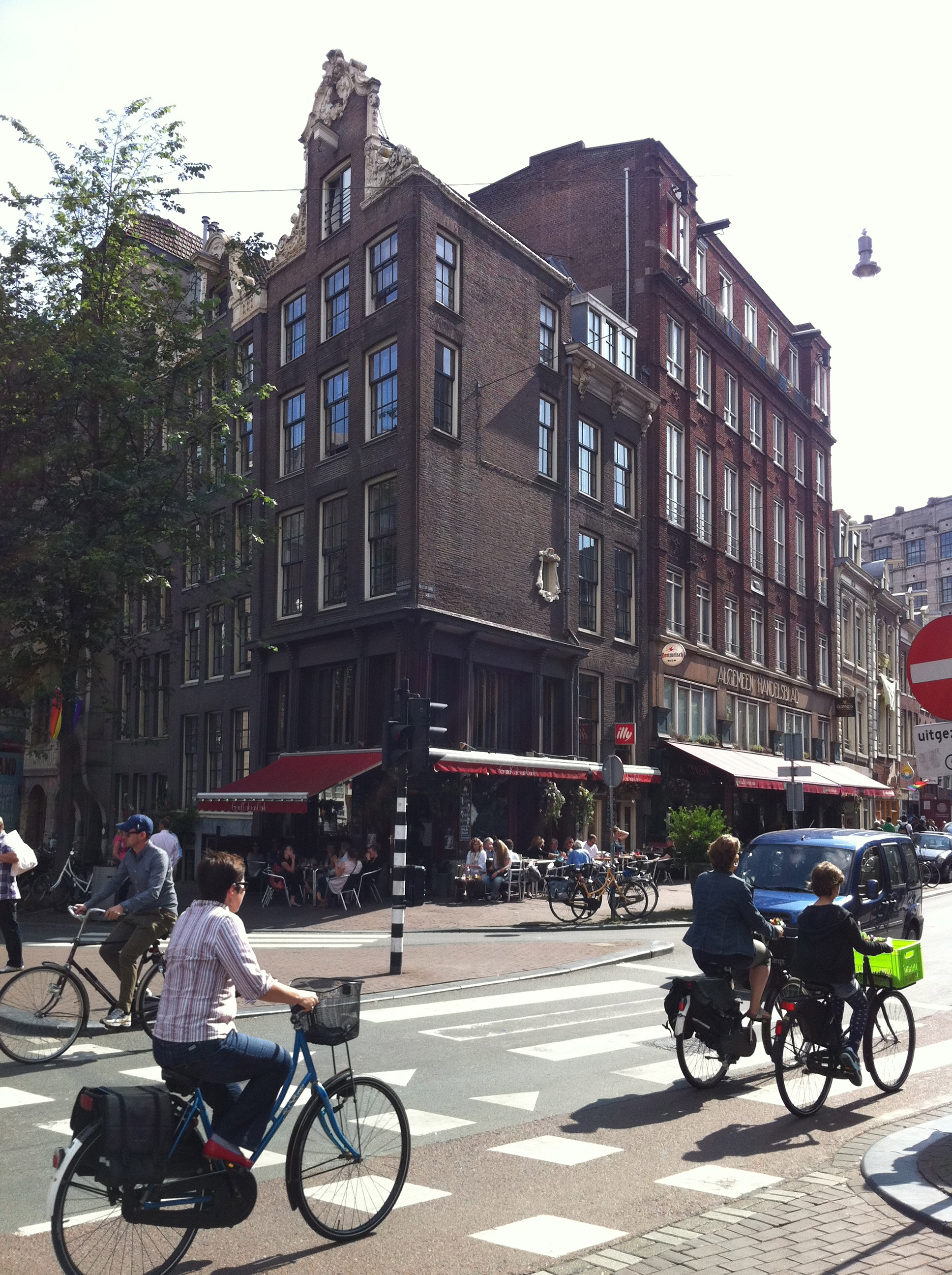
Corner building Paleisstraat/Nieuwezijds Voorburgwal in Amsterdam, where the Algemeen Handelsblad was founded

Algemeen Handelsblad was a Dutch daily newspaper founded in 1828 by stockbroker Jacob Willem van den Biesen. Originally liberal, economically focused, and Amsterdam-based, the paper merged in 1970 with the Nieuwe Rotterdamse Courant to form NRC Handelsblad.

== History ==
=== 1825–1899 ===
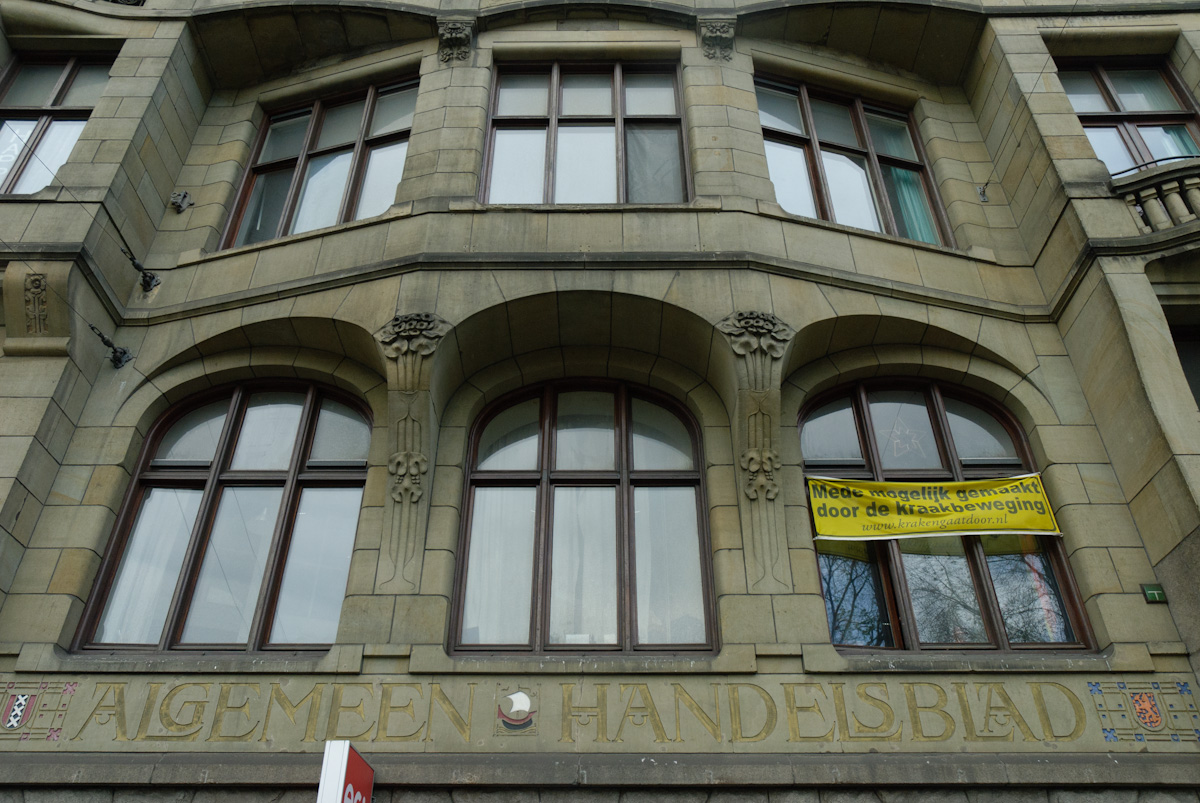
Squatted stronghold in the 1980s

Van den Biesen joined the trading house J.C. Wächter in 1822. In 1825, the firm began publishing a bi-weekly trade circular called Waarenberichten. After the firm was liquidated in 1827, Van den Biesen continued the publication as the Algemeen Handelsblad, which first appeared on 5 January 1828. From 1830 onwards, it became the first daily Dutch-language newspaper and began to take on a political tone in response to constitutional developments.

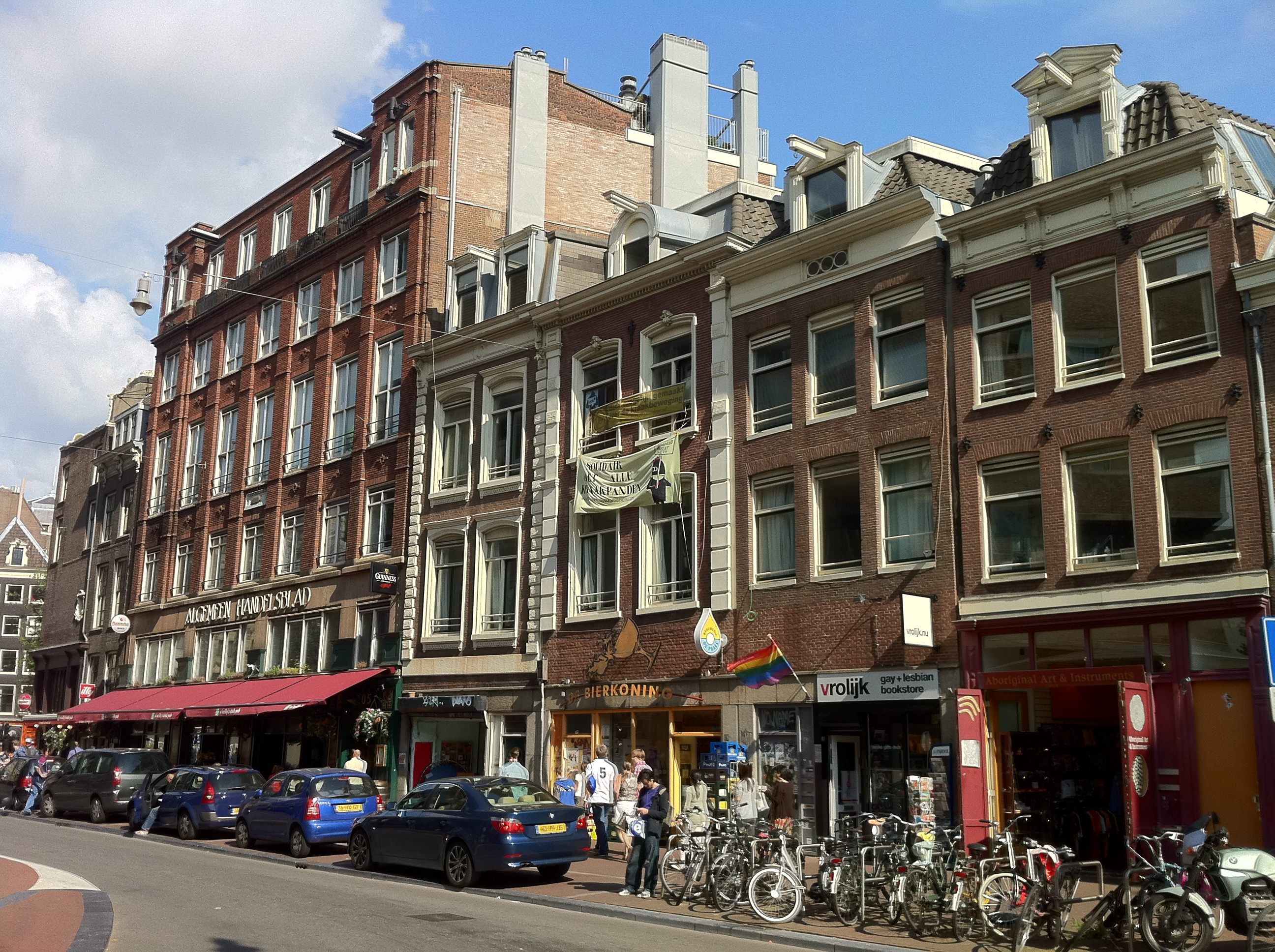
Paleisstraat, Amsterdam, July 2011

The paper was initially aimed at merchants and bankers, focusing on business reports, stock listings, and exchange rates. Unlike other newspapers of the time, it also reported news independently. Over time, it gained influence through moderate liberal commentary on national finances, trade policy, and colonial affairs. Its original location near the Beurs van Zocher and postal and telegraph services was strategic for news gathering.

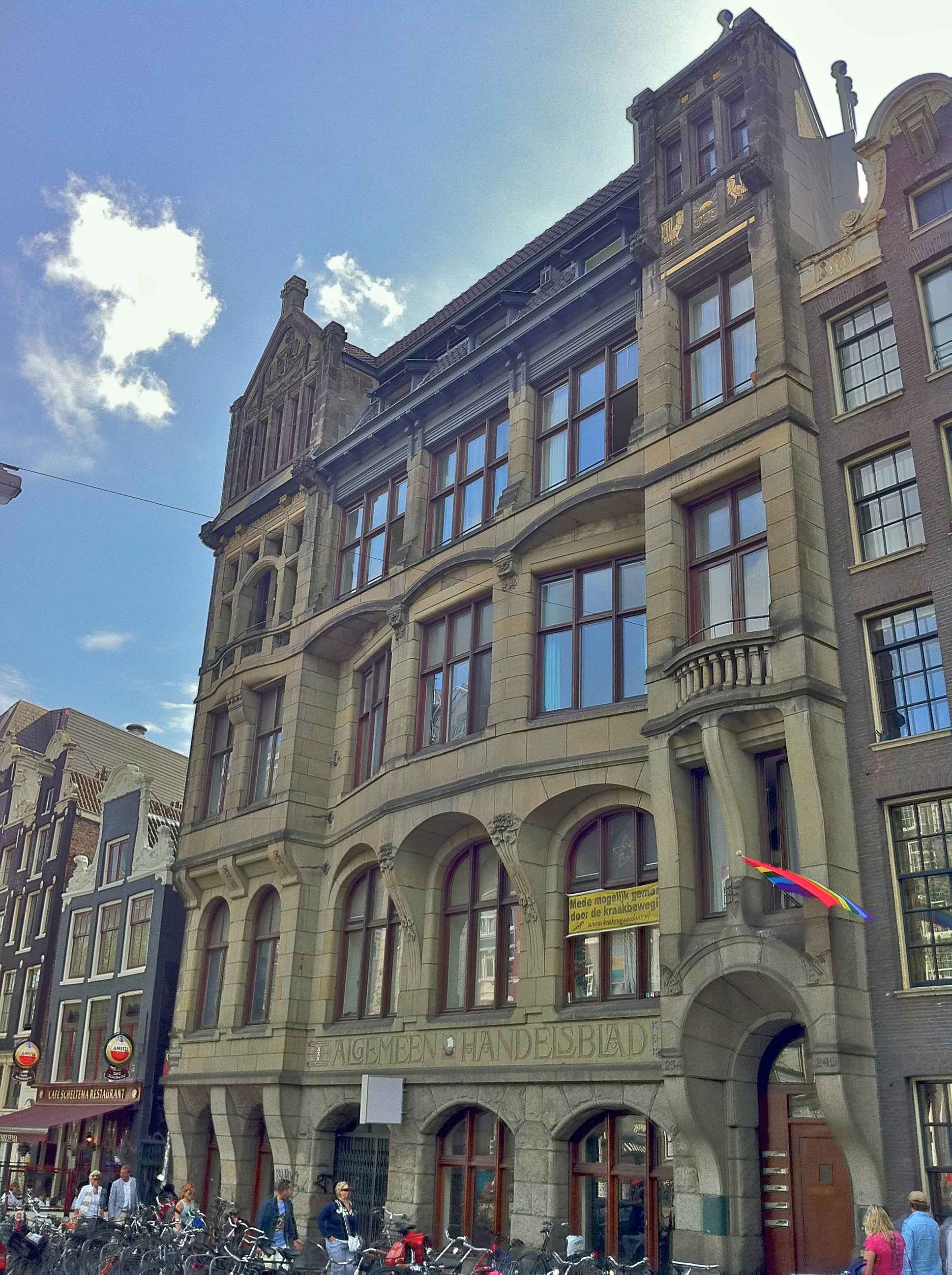
Built by Eduard Cuypers in 1903, now social housing

In 1831, the paper merged with the Nieuwe Amsterdamsche Courant. By 1882, circulation had grown to 9,000, making it one of the largest papers in the Netherlands. Charles Boissevain became a prominent editor during this period. During the Second Boer War, the paper supported the Boers, further increasing its popularity.

=== 2000–1970 ===
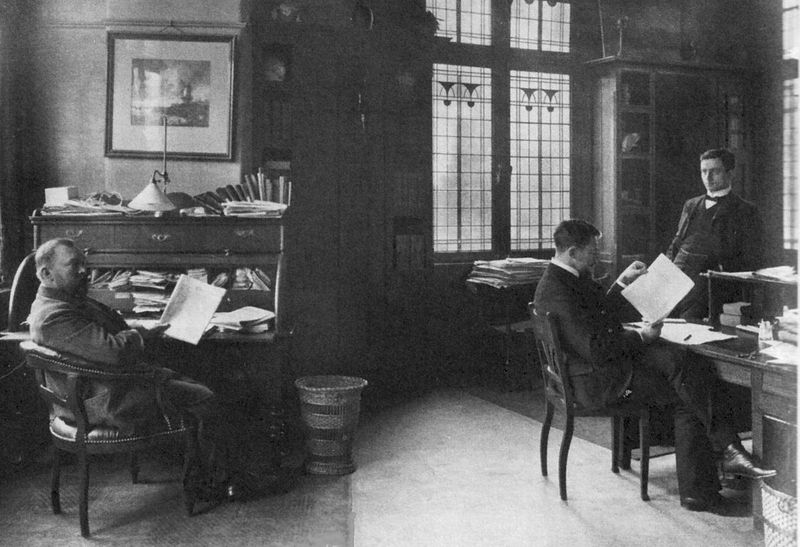
Editorial staff in 1904. Far right: Max Blokzijl

Around 1900, rapid growth necessitated a new building designed by Cuypers, completed in 1903. After World War I, the paper acquired more properties in central Amsterdam, often through demolition and new construction. In 1931, Daniel Johannes von Balluseck became sole editor-in-chief, continuing the paper’s right-liberal stance. His criticism of National Socialism led to tensions with director Alexander Heldring, culminating in his dismissal in 1938. However, Von Balluseck returned in late 1939.

Following the German invasion of the Netherlands in May 1940, Von Balluseck’s anti-Nazi stance led to increased readership. However, in July 1941, the Nazis raided the paper, arrested staff, and imposed NSB-friendly leadership. Anti-Semitic writers like Albert Kuyle joined, and the paper was transformed into a Nazi-aligned publication. Von Balluseck was imprisoned but released in 1944.

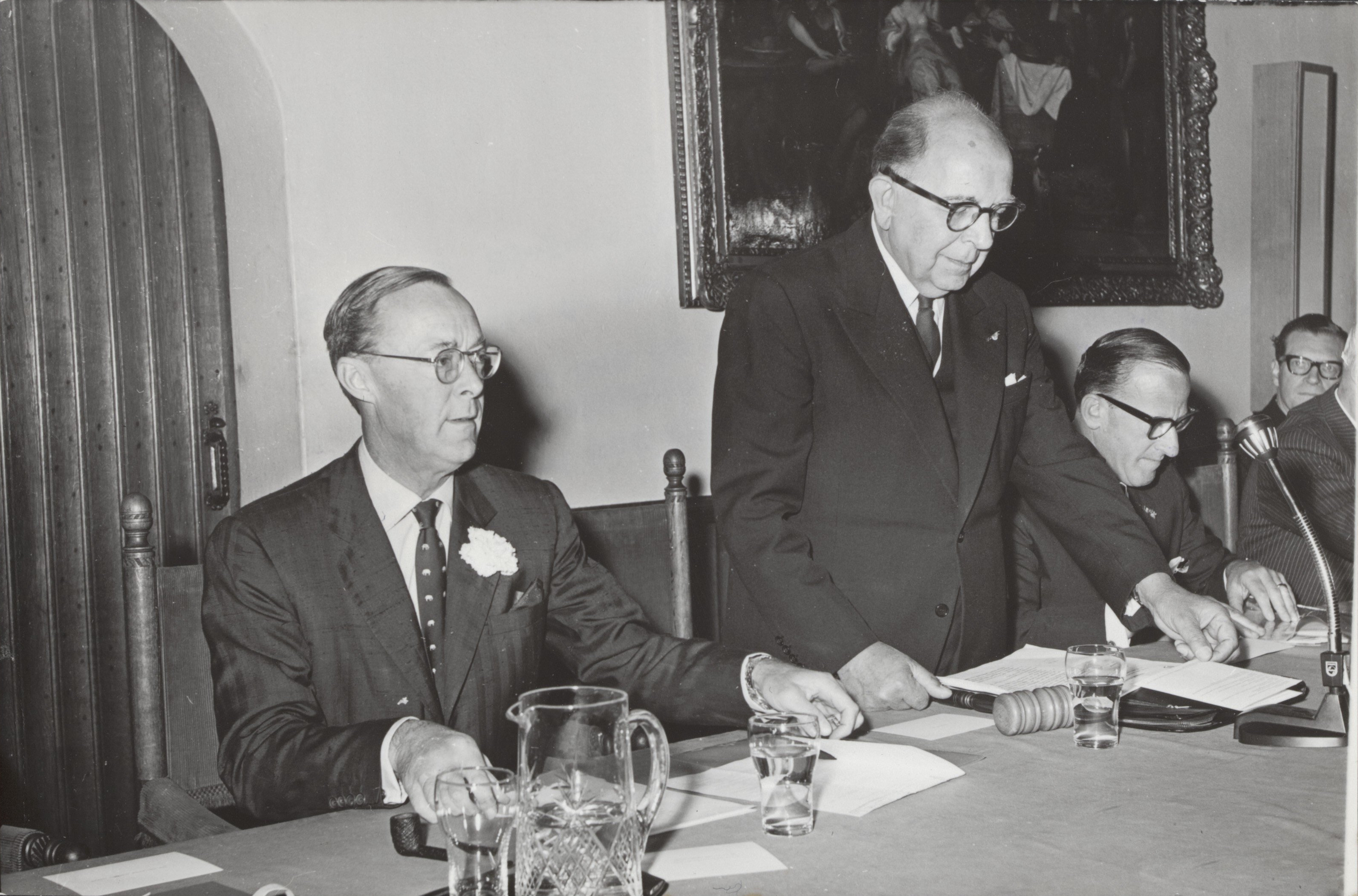
Von Balluseck (standing, 1965)

Post-liberation, Von Balluseck resumed leadership after a publication ban was lifted in September 1945. The paper was relaunched under a foundation chaired by Dirk Stikker. Von Balluseck tried to steer the paper toward a left-liberal direction inspired by The Manchester Guardian, but this alienated traditional readers. The paper eventually returned to its original editorial stance.

The paper operated for 25 more years. Notable journalists included Hans van Mierlo, Jan Blokker, and former editor-in-chief Henk Hofland. In 1960, it began cooperating with the Nieuwe Rotterdamse Courant and officially merged in 1970 due to financial difficulties.

=== Aftermath ===
The editorial office was centralized in Rotterdam. Printing had already moved there by the late 1970s. On 1 January 1977, the last staff members left the Amsterdam headquarters, which was sold to Van Zanten Vastgoed B.V. for redevelopment. Before demolition could occur, the building was squatted on 3 March 1978. It was sold in its squatted state to Wilma Vastgoed B.V., which planned new development. Pressure from squatters led the city to purchase the building in 1980 for youth housing and mixed use.

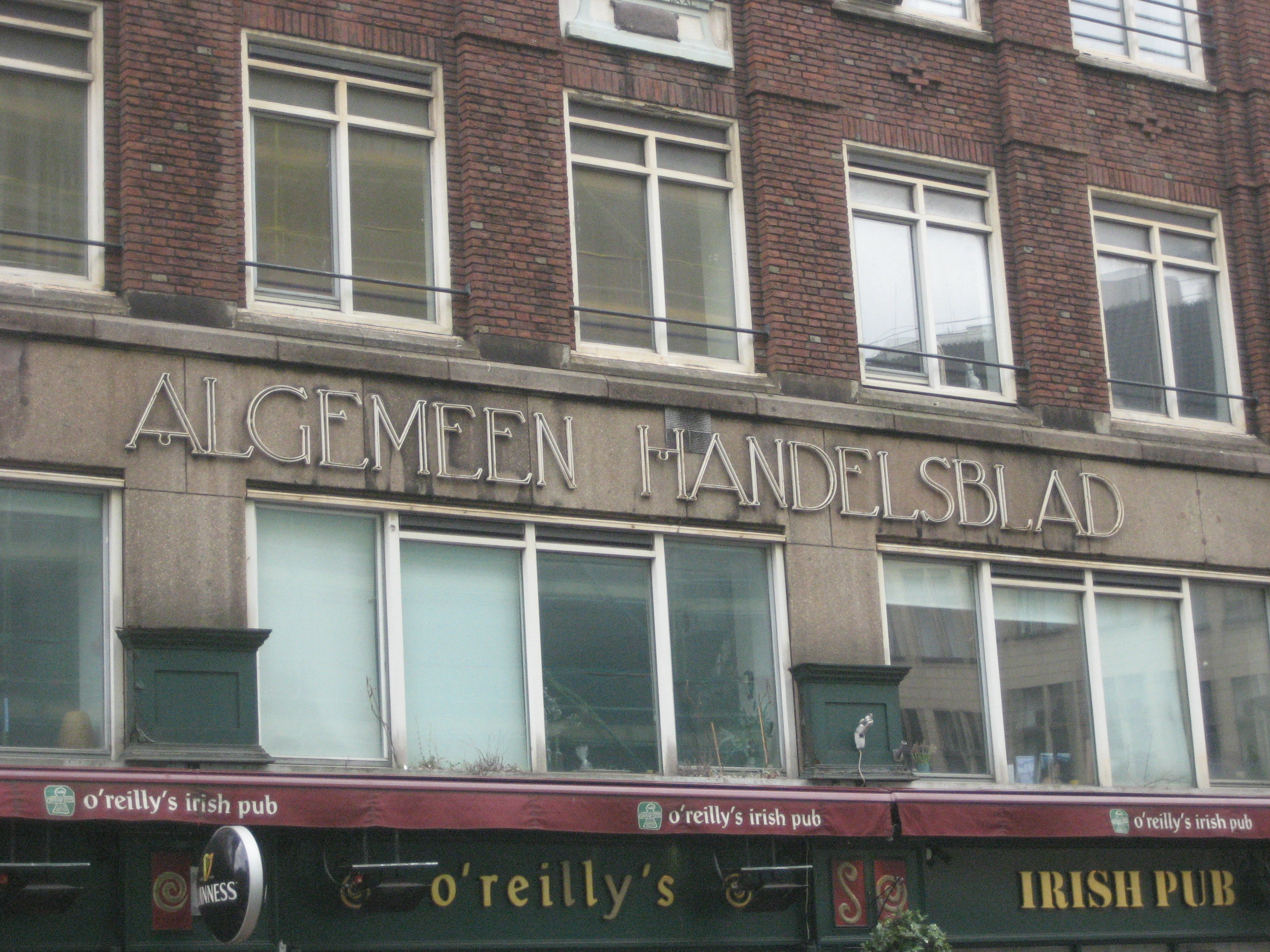
Paleisstraat façade

In May 1985, basic infrastructure repairs were undertaken. By November 1986, 81 temporary leases were in effect. Negotiations concluded in 1987 to redevelop the complex into 87 housing units and 7 commercial/work spaces. Renovation began in 1988 and was completed in summer 1990. The complex officially reopened on 4 September 1990.

The Municipal Housing Company Amsterdam handled the redevelopment and management, which was privatized in 1994 into the foundation Het Woningbedrijf Amsterdam. Between 2004 and 2014, it merged into the larger housing corporation Ymere, which now manages the property. Much of the retail space has since been sold to private owners.
