= Special Jurisdiction (Netherlands) =

The Special Jurisdiction (Dutch: Bijzondere Rechtspleging) was a special judicial process that was established in the Netherlands to try defendants accused having committed high treason, treason and war crimes immediately after the country’s liberation during the Second World War. There were 14,000 such cases, and 145 of them led to sentence of death. Only 42 of those cases actually led to an execution by a firing squad. They were the last instances of capital punishment in the Netherlands.

A few people who were famously sentenced to death and actually executed were Max Blokzijl, Anton Mussert and Ans van Dijk (the only woman to be executed).

== Central Archive for Special Jurisdiction ==
The records of the Special Court, comprising the files of roughly 300,000 individuals who were suspected of collaborating with the Germans, make up the Centraal Archief Bijzondere Rechtspleging (CABR), Dutch for "Central Archive for Special Jurisdiction", stored at the National Archives of the Netherlands. It is the largest archive on the Second World War in the Netherlands.

In February 2023, a project (Oorlog voor de Rechter, or "War in Court") was started aiming to digitise the entire CABR in order to make the archive digitally accessible to a wide audience. It is a joint project by the National Archives, the Dutch Network of War Collections, the Huygens Institute, and the NIOD Institute for War, Holocaust and Genocide.

== See also ==
- The Breda Four
