= Max Blokzijl =

Dutch singer and journalist

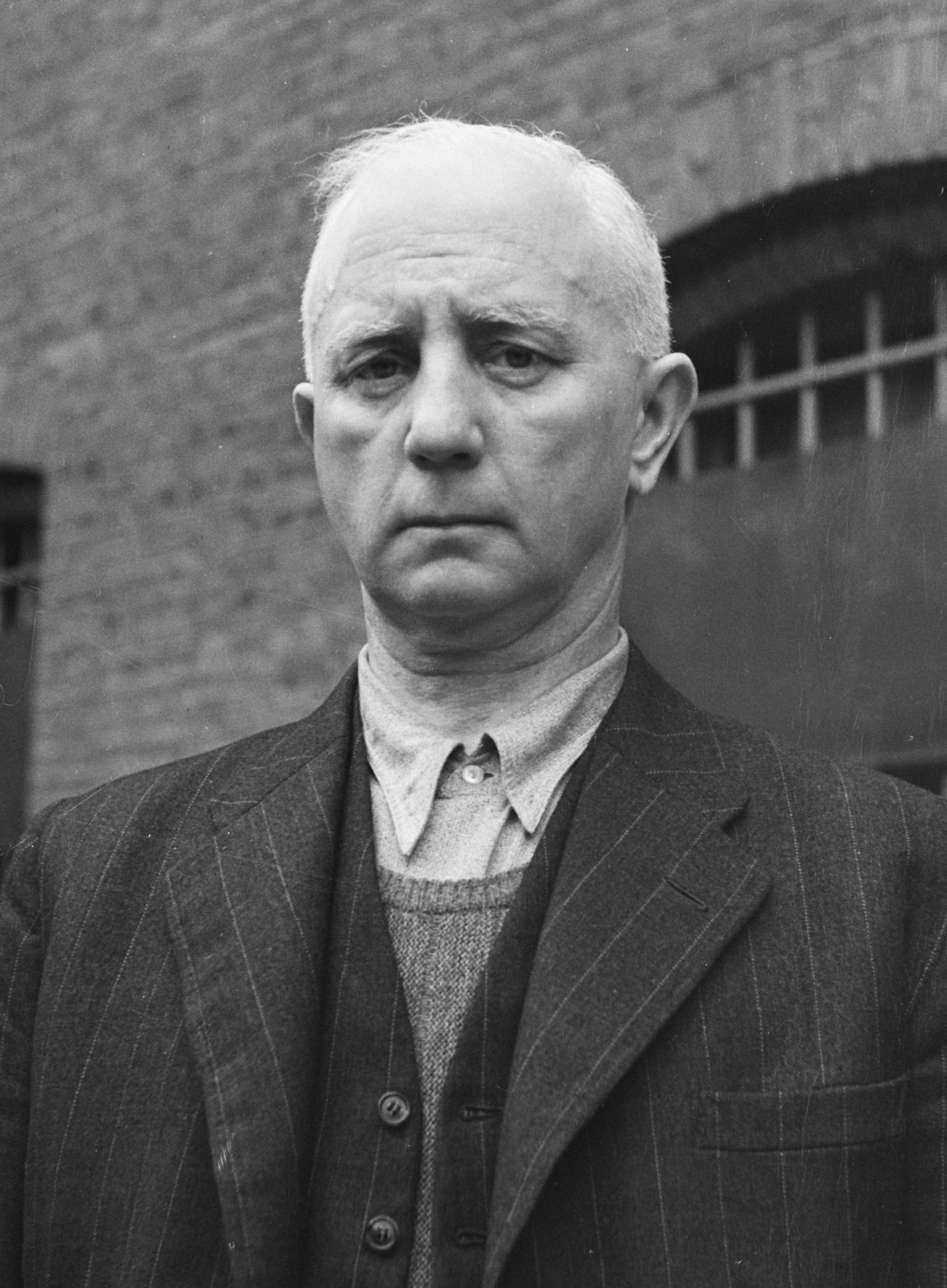
- Max Blokzijl in 1945
- Born: Marius Hugh Louis Wilhelm Blokzijl; 20 December 1884; Leeuwarden, Netherlands
- Died: 16 March 1946 (aged 61); Scheveningen, Netherlands
- Occupation: Journalist
- Employer: Algemeen Handelsblad
- Political party: National Socialist Movement in the Netherlands
- Status: Executed by firing squad
- Conviction: Treason
- Penalty: Death

Marius Hugh Louis Wilhelm "Max" Blokzijl (Note: The phrase Marius Hugh Louis Wilhelm Blokzijl is pronounced [ˈmaːrijə ˈɕuː ˈluʋi ˈʋɪləm ˈblɔksɛil]. The first two names in isolation are pronounced [ˈmaːrijəs] and [juː]. Max Blokzijl is pronounced [mɑks ˈblɔksɛil].) (20 December 1884 – 16 March 1946) was a Dutch singer and journalist. After the German occupation of the Netherlands, Blokzijl was sentenced to death and executed for his collaboration with Nazi Germany.

== Life ==
Born in Leeuwarden, one of his grandmothers was Jewish. He trained as a journalist before taking employment with the liberal Algemeen Handelsblad in 1903. Appointed foreign correspondent for the paper in 1908 he remained in this role until 1913 when he was given the role of Berlin correspondent. Blokzijl settled in Berlin in 1918, working for the German press until 1940, while also serving as president of the Niederländischer Bund in Deutschland.

Although based outside the Netherlands, Blokzijl, who had become a convinced Nazi, joined the National Socialist Movement in the Netherlands (NSB) in 1935. He returned to his homeland following the German invasion and became the propaganda chief for the new NSB puppet regime. In February 1941, the NSB forcibly replaced Hendrikus Colijn as editor of the Protestant newspaper De Standaard with Blokzijl, who held the title of General Secretary for Press Affairs for the party. In fact Blokzijl's role was much greater than his title implied as he was actually effective head of the press in the Netherlands. He also broadcast pro-Nazi shows on Radio Hilversum which were particularly noted for the strength of their anti-British sentiment.

On 16 March 1946 Blokzijl became the first Dutch collaborator to be executed, dying at Scheveningen.
