= Albert Boer =

Dutch writer (1935–2002)

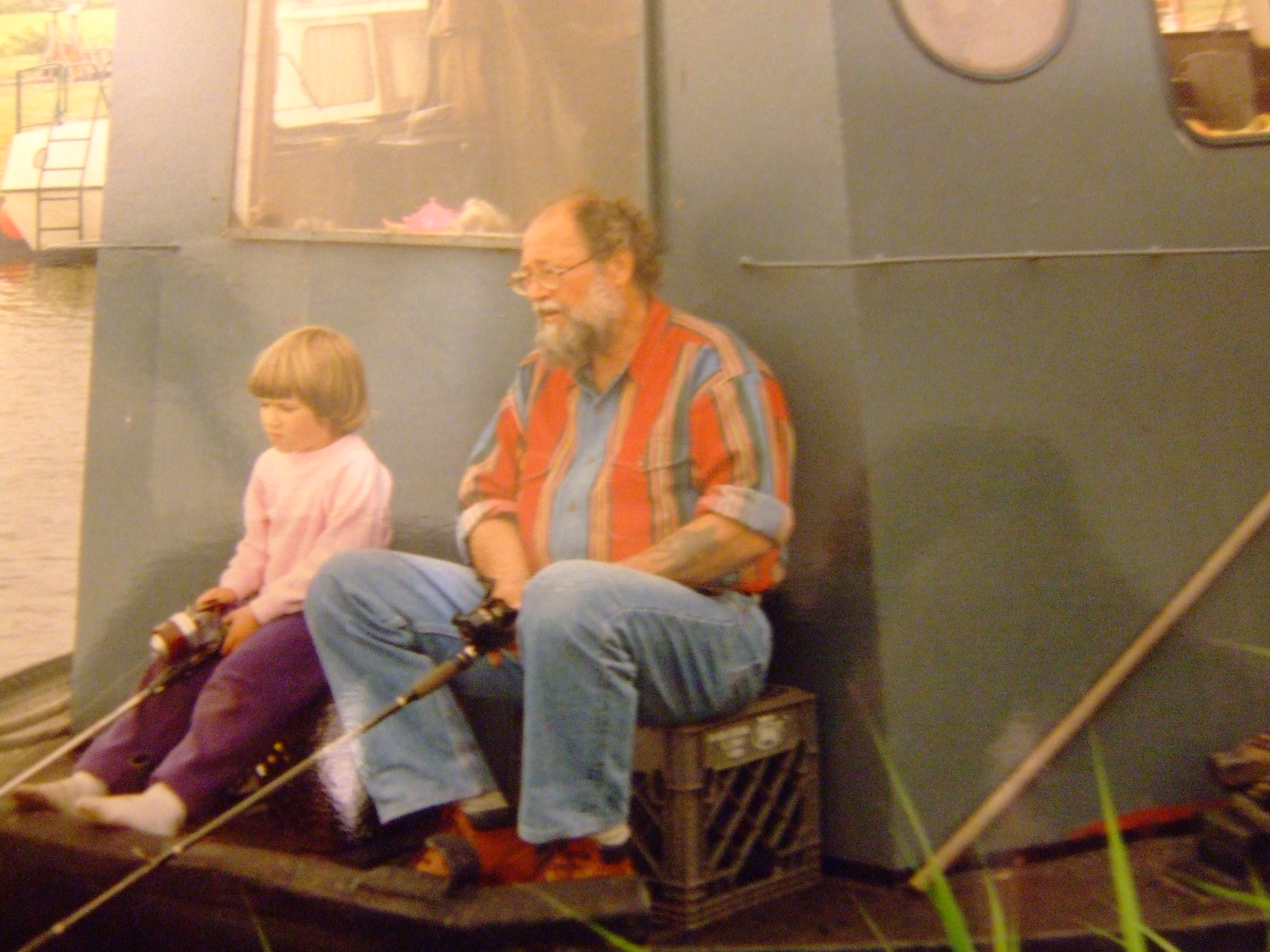
- Born: 1935; Beverwijk, Netherlands
- Died: 3 October 2002 (aged 66–67); Groet, Netherlands
- Education: Morehouse College and Spelman College, Atlanta University
- Occupations: Author; Sculptor
- Writing career
- Notable work: Kamp Schoorl

Albert Boer (1935 – 3 October 2002) was a Dutch author and sculptor, best known for Kamp Schoorl, a Dutch-language book about the World War II concentration camp of the same name.

== Biography ==
Boer was born in Beverwijk, Netherlands, in 1935. He moved to the United States in the mid-1950s, where he studied at Morehouse College and Spelman College of Atlanta University (now Clark Atlanta University).

He worked in the civil rights movement and was involved with settlement houses including the United South End Settlements, Franklin-Wright Settlement, and Elizabeth Peabody House in Boston. He served as a program director at Lincoln House and was interviewed in 1974 regarding his work in community development and urban change.

== Works ==
- The Development of USES: A Chronology of the United South End Settlements, 1891–1966. Boston: United South End Settlements, 1966.
- Kamp Schoorl. Netherlands. ISBN 9789090068084.
