= Kamp Amersfoort =

Nazi concentration camp in the Netherlands (1941–1945)

Kamp Amersfoort Polizeiliches Durchgangslager Amersfoort
- Concentration camp
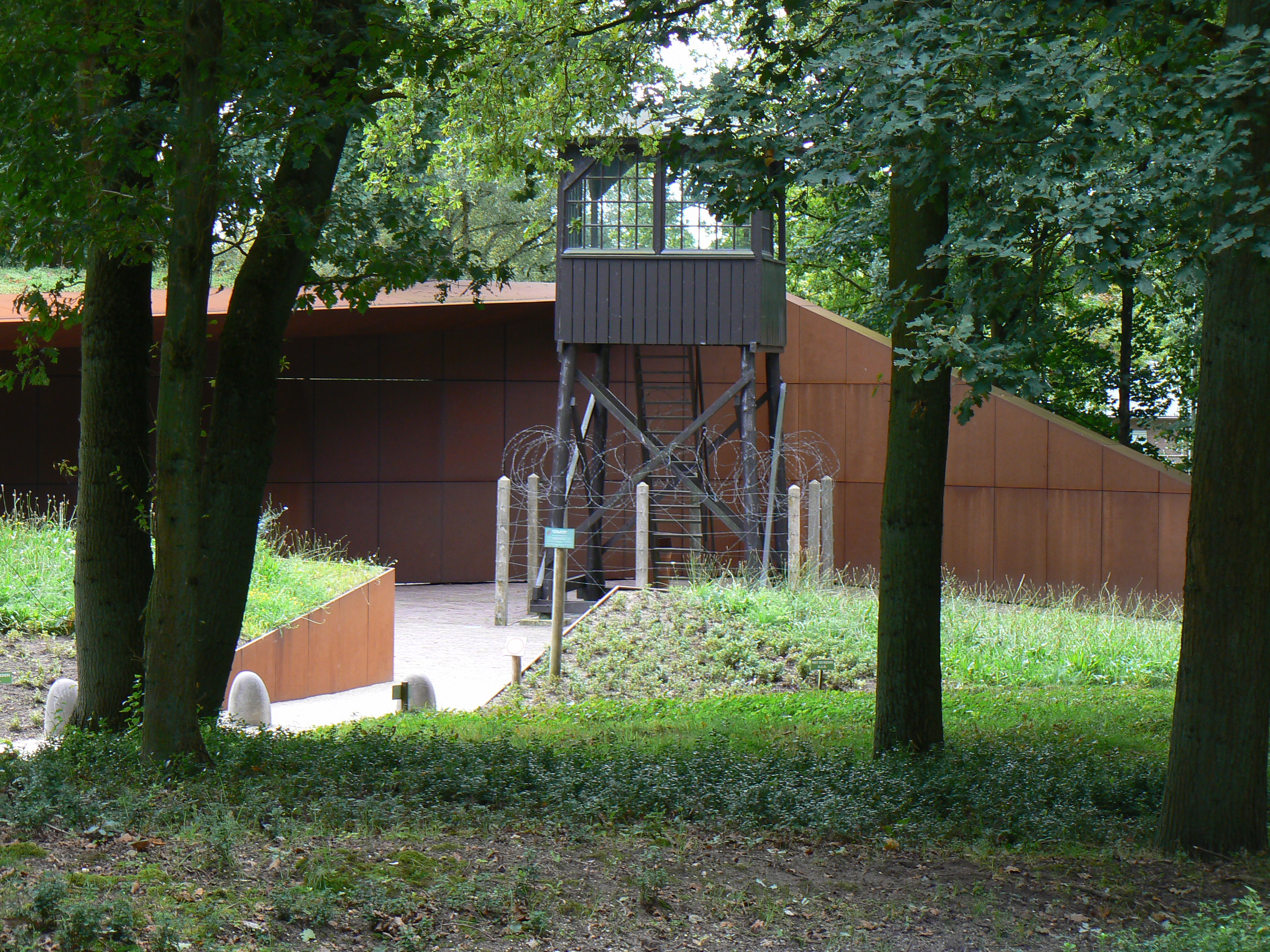
- The camp watchtower

- Location of the camp in the Netherlands
- Coordinates: 52°7′57″N 5°21′56″E
- Other names: Polizeiliches Durchgangslager Amersfoort
- Location: Leusden near Amersfoort, province of Utrecht, the Netherlands
- Operated by: SS
- Commandant: Walter Heinrich; Karl Peter Berg; Joseph Kotalla
- Operational: 18 August 1941 – 18 April 1945
- Number of inmates: 47,000
- Killed: 650
- Liberated by: transferred to Red Cross
- Website: www.kampamersfoort.nl

Kamp Amersfoort (Dutch: Kamp Amersfoort, German: Durchgangslager Amersfoort) was a Nazi concentration camp near the city of Amersfoort, the Netherlands. The official name was "Polizeiliches Durchgangslager Amersfoort", P.D.A. or Amersfoort Police Transit Camp. 47,000 prisoners were held there between 1941 and 1945. The camp was situated in the northern part of the municipality of Leusden, on the municipal boundary between Leusden and Amersfoort in the central Netherlands.

== Early history ==
In 1939, Kamp Amersfoort was still a complex of barracks that supported army artillery exercises on the nearby Leusderheide. From 1941 onwards, it did not merely function as a transit camp, as the name suggests. The terms "penal camp" or "work camp" would also be fitting. During the existence of the camp, many prisoners were put to work in work units. In total, around 37,000 prisoners were registered at Amersfoort.

To get to the camp, prisoners had to walk from the railway sidings through the town and through residential neighborhoods:

Visible in the windows, above and below, of most residences and behind closed lace curtains, were numerous silhouettes, especially those of children. Usually, the silhouettes did not move. Sometimes, feebly and furtively, they waved. Children who waved were very quickly pulled back. It was a farewell from the inhabited world – now a realm of shades.

== 1941–1943 ==
The history of the camp can be separated into two periods. The first period began on August 18, 1941, and ended in March 1943. In March 1943 all but eight of the surviving first prisoners in Amersfoort were transferred to Kamp Vught concentration camp. The prisoner transfer to Kamp Vught allowed for the completion of an expansion of Kamp Amersfoort. Maintaining the camp, despite Kamp Vught becoming operational in January 1943, still appeared necessary to the Nazis.

Following the invasion of the USSR in June 1941, the camp held Soviet prisoners of war. These included 101 Uzbek prisoners brought to display to the Dutch for propaganda purposes, all either dying in the winter of 1941 or executed in woods near the camp in April 1942. 865 Soviet prisoners are buried in nearby Rusthof cemetery.

Amersfoort was a transit camp, whence prisoners were sent to places like Buchenwald, Mauthausen and Neuengamme concentration camps. It was on July 15, 1942, that the Germans began deporting Dutch Jews from Amersfoort, Vught, and Westerbork to concentration camps and death camps such as Auschwitz, Sobibor and Theresienstadt.

== 1943–1945 ==
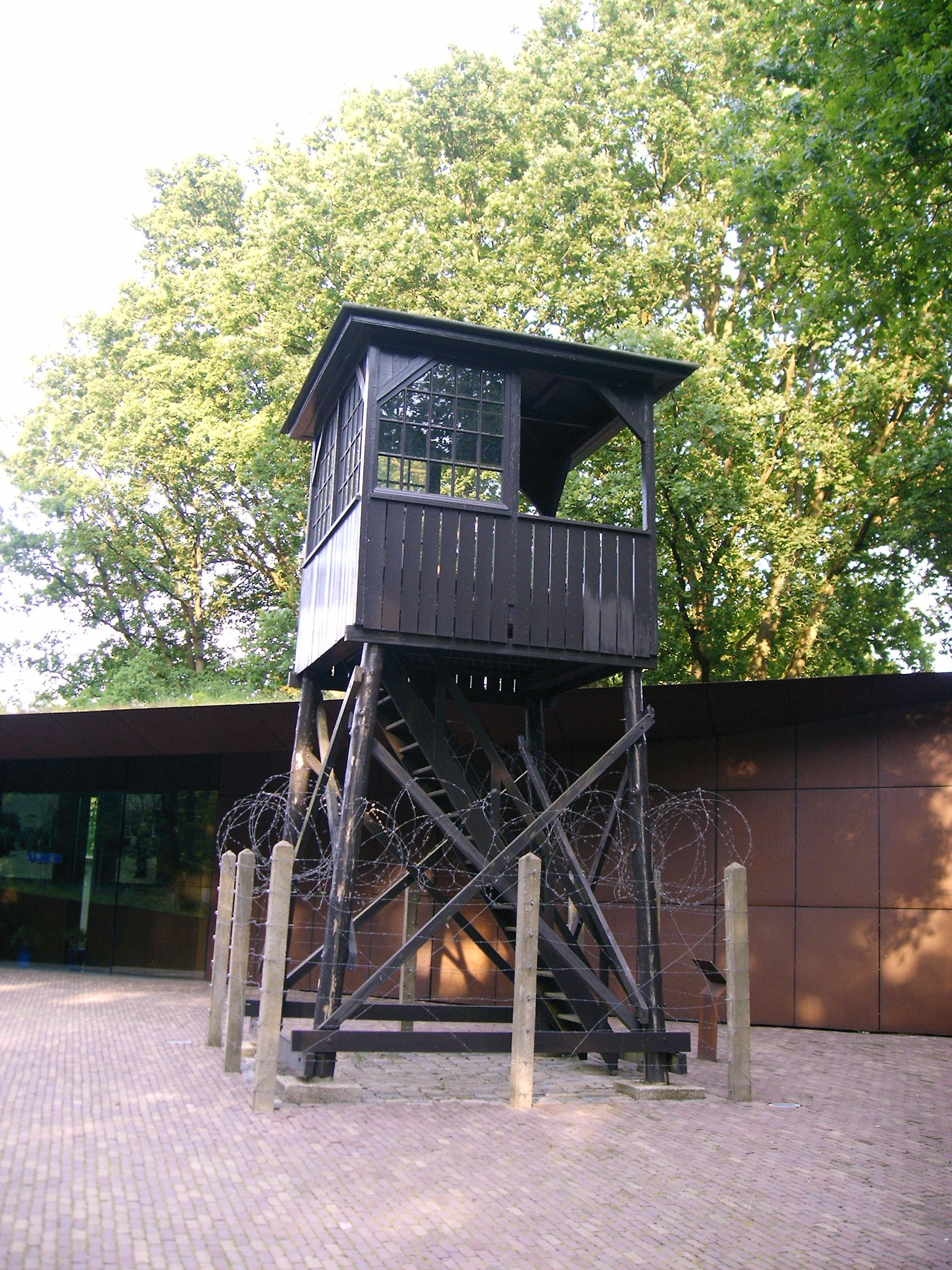
The watch tower

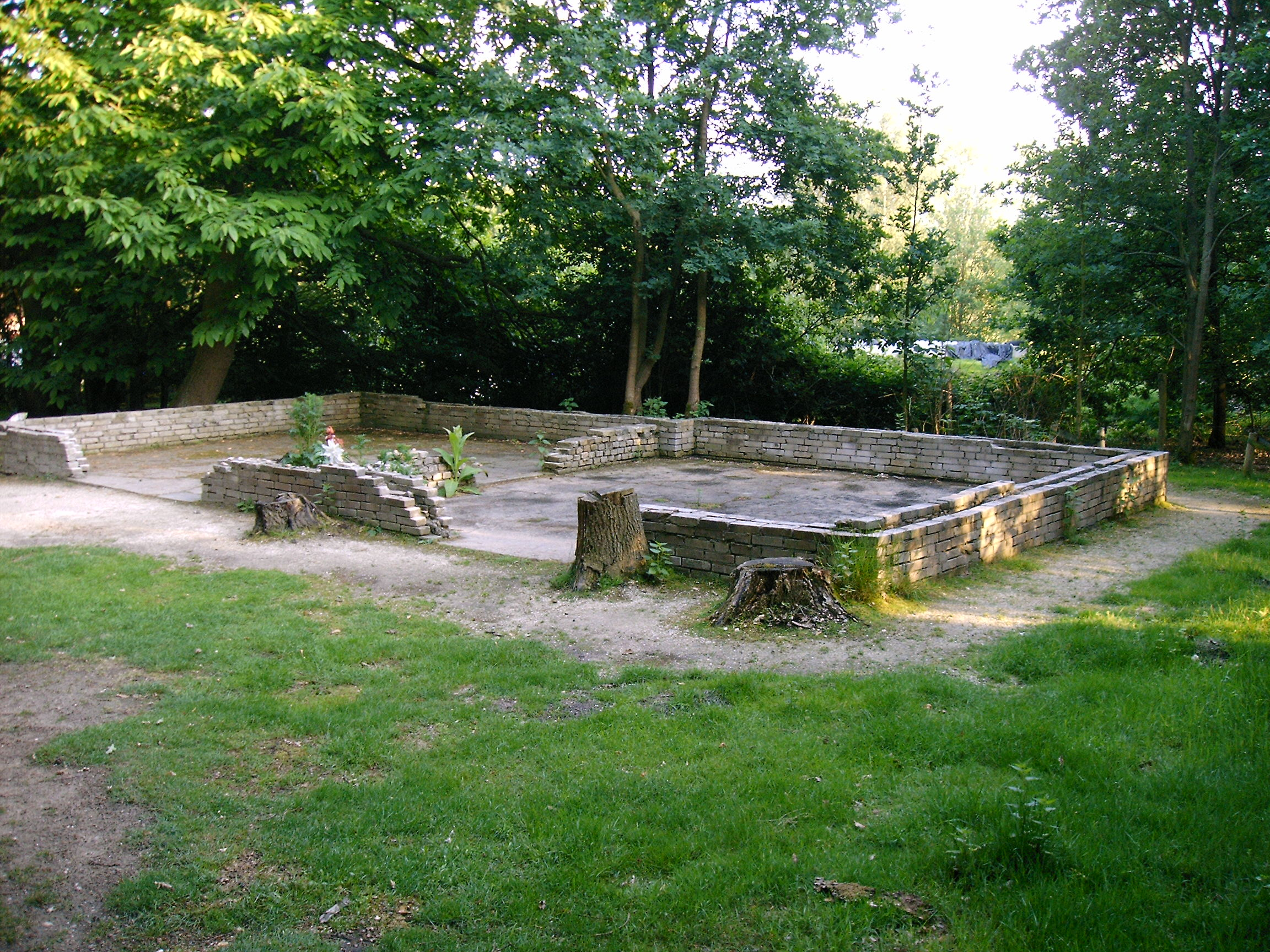
Ruins of the mortuary

The remaining watchtower, as can be seen on the memorial, was built around April/May 1943, when the expansion of Kamp Amersfoort was completed and prisoners could be held there again. In many ways, Kamp Amersfoort had changed relative to the first period. The most important changes were the much larger 'housing capacity', and the faster 'turnover'. What stayed the same, were the anarchy, the lack of hygiene, the lack of food, lack of medical attention, and the cruelty of the guards. A point of light for the prisoners was the presence of the Dutch Red Cross. The second period ended on April 19, 1945, when control of the camp was transferred to Loes van Overeem of the Red Cross following the sudden flight of the German camp staff, who took 70 odd prisoners with them to the "Oranje Hotel", a jail in Scheveningen used by the Germans to house opponents to their regime. The facility remained in operation under the auspices of the Red Cross until May 7, when Canadian soldiers of the First Canadian Army arrived to officially liberate the camp. Soldiers of I Canadian Corps fighting north from Arnhem were halted about a mile from Amersfoort before the end of the war, and liberation came on the day the German forces laid down their arms in the Netherlands. The camp and surrounding area was administered by the 1st Canadian Division and later transferred to the 3rd Canadian Division, Canadian Army Occupation Force in June 1945.

== Prisoner population and life in Amersfoort ==
The fluctuating prisoner population consisted of an eclectic group of people from all over the Netherlands: Jews, Jehovah's Witnesses, Soviet prisoners of war, members of the resistance, communists, hostages, clergy, alleged black marketeers, clandestine butchers, and smugglers. Between 1941 and 1943, 8,800 people were imprisoned in the camp, of whom 2,200 were deported to Germany. During the period 1943–1945, 26,500 people were imprisoned, of whom 18,000 were sent east to places such as Buchenwald and Natzweiler concentration camps.

After the re-opening in 1943, 70 Jews from Kamp Vught and 600 Jews from Kamp Westerbork of British, American, and Hungarian nationality were briefly sent to Kamp Amersfoort. They were joined by contract breakers of the German Arbeitseinsatz (forced labour program), deserting Waffen SS soldiers, deserting German truck drivers of the Nationalsozialistische Kraftfahr-Korps, and lawbreaking members of the NSB (the Dutch National Socialist Movement).

This mixture of prisoners was not the only feature that determined the character of Kamp Amersfoort. The extreme cruelty of the camp command made life miserable for thousands of prisoners. Despite their relatively short stay, many prisoners died from deprivations and violence at a camp where "rumour has it that one can hear the screams of people being beaten up there for miles over the heath. It is more than a rumour." The approximately 2,500 Jews and 100 Soviet-POWs were treated particularly violently. Jewish prisoners were also treated horribly by fellow prisoners.

Edith and Rosa Stein, two ethnic Jewish Catholics arrested by the SS, described what it was like arriving at Amersfoort at 3:00 in the morning on August 3, 1942:

When the vans reached the camp, they emptied their passengers who were taken over by the S.S. guards. These began to drive them, cursing and swearing, beating them on their backs with their truncheons, into a hut where they were to pass the night without having had a meal.

The hut was divided into two sections, one for men, one for women. It was separated from the main lager by a barbed-wire fence. Altogether, the lager held at that moment, about three hundred men, women and children.

The beds were iron frames arranged in a double tier, without mattresses of any kind. Our prisoners threw themselves on the bare springs trying to snatch a few minutes sleep; but few slept that night, if only because the guards kept switching the lights off and on, from time to time, as a precaution against attempts to escape, which was next to impossible in any case. Their cold harsh voices filled the prisoners with anxiety about the future and, in these circumstances, it is anxiety which can turn a prison into a hell on earth.

Violence by the guards was not the only thing that prisoners had to worry about. Weakened physical conditions from overwork, very little food and poor hygiene in camp made illness and disease another frightening and lonely way to die. Yehudit Harris, a young boy in Amersfoort remembers screaming from the pain as his mother washed him with snow in the winter to rid them of lice and to protect against illness. Even the mattresses that prisoners slept on were often infested with lice, diphtheria, dysentery or T.B.

Amersfoort was a brutal place to be a prisoner and is summed up by Elie Cohen, who said that "transfer from Amersfoort to Westerbork was like going from hell to heaven".

== Camp organizational structure ==
Highest responsible authority went to the Lagerkommandant (camp commander). Below him was the Lagerführer (camp leader), who actually ran the camp. His assistants were the Blockführer (barrack leaders). Virtually all prisoners were divided into work units or Kommandos. These kommandos were led by an Arbeitsführer. The lowest leadership level were the Ältesten (Elders), also called "prominents" or "foremen". These were prisoners, who in exchange for taking care of minor issues, usually theft among prisoners, received special privileges.

== Camp leadership ==
Wachbataillon Nord-West (6 companies, around 1200 men total) was commanded by SS-Hauptsturmführer Paul Anton Helle.

The first of these six companies was in charge of Kamp Amersfoort, under the command of SS-Obersturmführer Walter Heinrich. This company was split into Kamp-SS (20 men selected by Heinrich) and Guard-SS (100 men).

The first camp leader was SS-Schutzhaftlagerführer I Johann Friedrich Stöver. From January 1, 1943, the camp leader was SS-Schutzhaftlagerführer II Karl Peter Berg. Berg was a very cruel man, who was described as a "predator who derived great pleasure from the agony of others". During roll call he loved to sneak about unnoticed behind the rows of men and catch someone in some violation, such as talking or not following orders properly. With a big grin, he would torment his victim."

Another camp leader was SS-Unter-Schutzhaftlagerführer Josef Johann Kotalla, a notorious sadist who often replaced Stöver during his absence. This former sales representative and repeat psychiatric patient was one of the most infamous SS guards in Amersfoort. B.W. Stomps, a Resistance fighter sent to Amersfoort recalled Kotalla's actions in the Christmas season of 1944:

On 23 December, Kotalla announced a ban on parcels for three weeks, which meant no Red Cross presents for Christmas or New Year. He further canceled breakfast, lunch and dinner on Christmas Day itself, using the discovery of a smuggled letter as a pretext. And as an extra punishment on Christmas morning he kept the men standing on the parade ground, which was covered with thick snow, from their roll-call at seven till half past midday. A few days before, the geese for the guards' Christmas dinner had been on show, hanging on the barbed wire.

Also notorious were Blockführer Franzka, SS-Arbeitsdienstführer Max Ritter, SS-er Hugo Hermann Wolf, among many others.

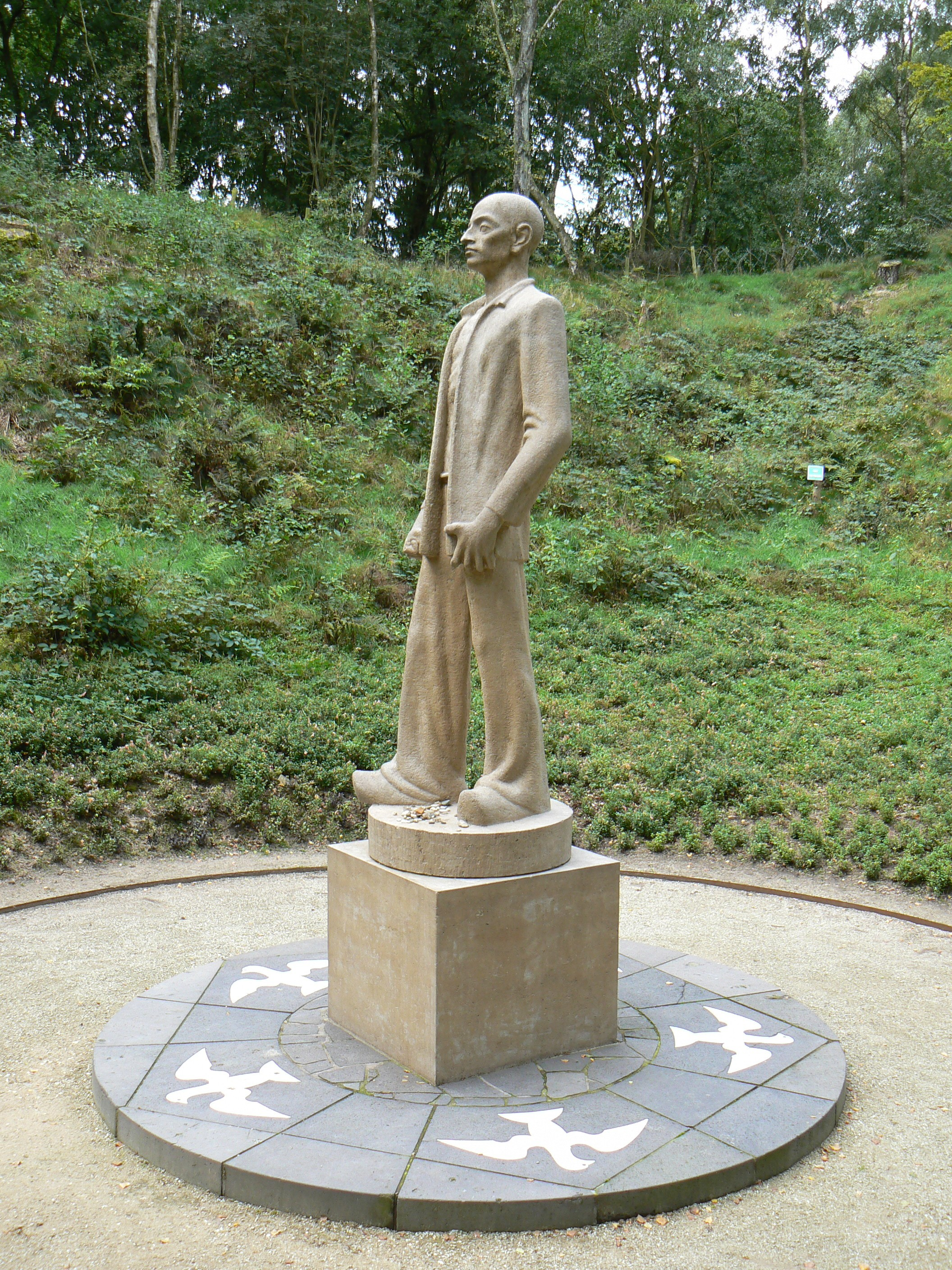
National monument in the former camp

In 1948 the camp commandant and guards of Amersfoort were tried and convicted for their crimes. Karl Peter Berg was sentenced to death and was executed in 1949. Josef Johann Kotalla was also sentenced to death but later commuted to life in prison. Along with three other prisoners he became involved in what was known as the "Breda Four", a group of prisoners whose possible release stirred up very strong feelings amongst Dutchmen. Kotalla was the only who was not eventually released from prison. He died in prison in 1979.

The NIOD Institute for War, Holocaust and Genocide Studies has many resources concerning the guards of Amersfoort and their trials. The NIOD has dossiers on the following Amersfoort guards and personnel: Berg, Brahm, Dohmen, Fernau, Helle, Kotalla, May, van der Neut, Oberle, Stöver, Voight, Westerveld and Wolf. Newspaper clippings are available for Berg, Fernau, Stöver and Helle.

Court records for the trial of these guards are also available, the following being an example of what is available:

1. Indictment and verbal reports made by the period of the trial against EE Alscher, K.P. Berg, E. Brahm, J.J. Kotälla, e.g. May, J. Oberle and H.H. Wolf, November 16–14 December 1948.
2. Graphic shorthand reports made by the period of the trial against EE Alscher, K.P. Berg, E. Brahm, J.J. Kotälla, e.g. May, J. Oberle and H.H. Wolf, 16–23 November 1948.

== See also ==
- German atrocities committed against Soviet prisoners of war
