= Joseph Kotalla =

German SS soldier and convicted war criminal

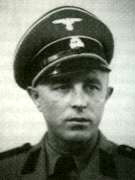
- Born: 14 July 1908; Bismarckhütte, German Empire
- Died: 31 July 1979 (aged 71); Breda Prison, Breda, Netherlands
- Spouse(s): Annerose (m. 1943–1960) Margarete (m. 1966)
- Military career
- Allegiance: Nazi Germany
- Branch: Schutzstaffel
- Rank: SS-Oberscharführer
- Nickname: Executioner of Amersfoort (Dutch: Beul van Amersfoort)
- Units: Sicherheitsdienst; Kamp Amersfoort
- Commands: Administration Kamp Amersfoort
- Conflicts: World War II

Joseph Johann (Jupp) Kotalla (Note: Sometimes misspelled Kotälla) (14 July 1908 – 31 July 1979) was a German SS soldier who was head of the administration and de facto deputy commander of Kamp Amersfoort concentration camp during World War II.

After the war, he was sentenced to death. After psychological evaluations, his sentence was commuted to life imprisonment. He was part of the Breda Four, the only four German war criminals who were not released before 1962. Public and political opposition prevented his release. Kotalla died in the Breda Prison in 1979. Kotalla was the only convicted German war criminal who died in a Dutch prison.

== Youth and early career ==
Kotalla was born on 14 July 1908 in Bismarckhütte in Upper Silesia, then German territory. He was the second oldest of five children. His mother was Agnes Pyrczyk and his father Josef Kotalla Sr., who worked in the local foundry.

He performed poorly in school. His mother pressured him to improve, which proved counter productive and led him to become anxious and tense. At the age of nine, Kotalla suffered a severe concussion, which kept him in hospital for a year and a half. He had a complex relationship with his father, which he claimed was because he was an illegitimate child, something that remains unclear.

After the First World War and the Silesian Uprisings, the part of Upper Silesia to which Bismarckhütte belonged, was assigned to Poland. Because Kotalla's father had opposed the annexation, armed Poles invaded Kotalla's home. Because Kotalla tried to protect his father, the Poles threatened to kill Kotalla before Allied forces relieved him. Kotalla was so shocked by the experience that he was temporarily admitted into a mental institution.

After a year of unemployment he started working in nearby mines. The work was again too heavy and he had to be treated in a hospital for boils under his arm. He briefly worked as a gardener, before experiencing another nervous breakdown and being taken into a mental institution. When he returned early 1939, he was allowed to work at the administration of the foundry again.

In the 1930s, Kotalla joined the Jungdeutsche Partei in Polen, an organisation founded by German national socialists in Upper Silesia. As repression against the German minority worsened and tensions between Germany and Poland escalated, Kotalla and his brothers fled to Germany in March 1939 to avoid being conscripted into the Polish army. Following the invasion of Poland, he returned and resumed his work at the foundry in September 1939.

== World War II ==
In November 1939, Kotalla was conscripted into German army and after a month assigned to the 8th TotenkopfStandarte, responsible for the outer security of Buchenwald concentration camp. In early 1940 he was transferred to the 11th TotenkopfStandarte, stationed in Poland. The 11th was notorious for brutal executions, rapes, looting and public drunkenness. After the war, his lawyer let slip that Kotalla had been hardened by the SS massacres in Poland.

In June 1940, the 11th was transferred to the recently invaded Netherlands and Kotalla was stationed near Arnhem. After the conquest of France, all Waffen-SS members older than thirty years were eligible for extended leave, including Kotalla. In September 1940, Kotalla returned to Bismarckhütte.

=== Scheveningen prison ===
Kotalla's extended leave ended in January 1941. After a shortened training at the Grenzpolizeischule, he was assigned to SiPo/SD at the cell barracks of the Scheveningen prison in the Netherlands in February 1941.

Under the influence of the brutal deputy director Johann Schweiger, who was in day-to-day charge, Kotalla treated the prisoners cruelly. Together with Schweiger, he had Jewish prisoners hosed down in the courtyard during the winter of 1941–1942. They were forced to carry coal in sacks while being beaten and kicked by Kotalla. Even outside of Schweiger's presence, he beat, kicked, and tormented prisoners, particularly Jews. Although many guards in the prison were guilty of mistreatment, Kotalla was regarded as one of the worst.

=== Kamp Amersfoort ===
In September 1942 he was appointed by Schutzhaftlagerführer II Karl Peter Berg in Kamp Amersfoort. He entered service there as a camp SS soldier and became head of the Schreibstube, the administration. He started his duties at Abteiling III (Section 3).

Even after his appointment in Amersfoort, Kotalla was treated psychiatrically. From December 1942 to about April 1943 he was nursed in the psychiatric ward of a German military hospital. After his return from the hospital in Kamp Amersfoort he was called "UnterSchutzhaftlagerführer", in which position he replaced Berg as commander in his absence. As SS-Oberscharführer he was seconded to the Sicherheitsdienst of the camp. According to Kotalla, he continued to work in Kamp Amersfoort until 20 April 1945. Although he was still married, he had several mistresses in the camp. In 1944, Kotalla started a relationship with 21-year-old Louisa Johanna (Loes) van den Bogert, a Dutch typist who worked at Abteilung III of the camp.

Kotalla was described as the most notorious camp executioner of Kamp Amersfoort and was nicknamed The Executioner of Amersfoort. He had a short temper, took pervitine, drank liters of gin and mainly targeted Jews and priests. Kotalla was known, among other things, for his brutality during the daily roll call, kicking and hitting prisoners with a club. In one case, as a punishment exercise, he had prisoners lie on their backs and then stamped his boots over them. He delighted to give the prisoners only five minutes to finish their hot meal. In at least one instance, he let his shepherd dog loose on a prisoner. He also kicked between the prisoners' legs; in the camp this was called the 'Kotalla kick'. Kotalla took part in a firing squad several times.

== Trial and conviction ==
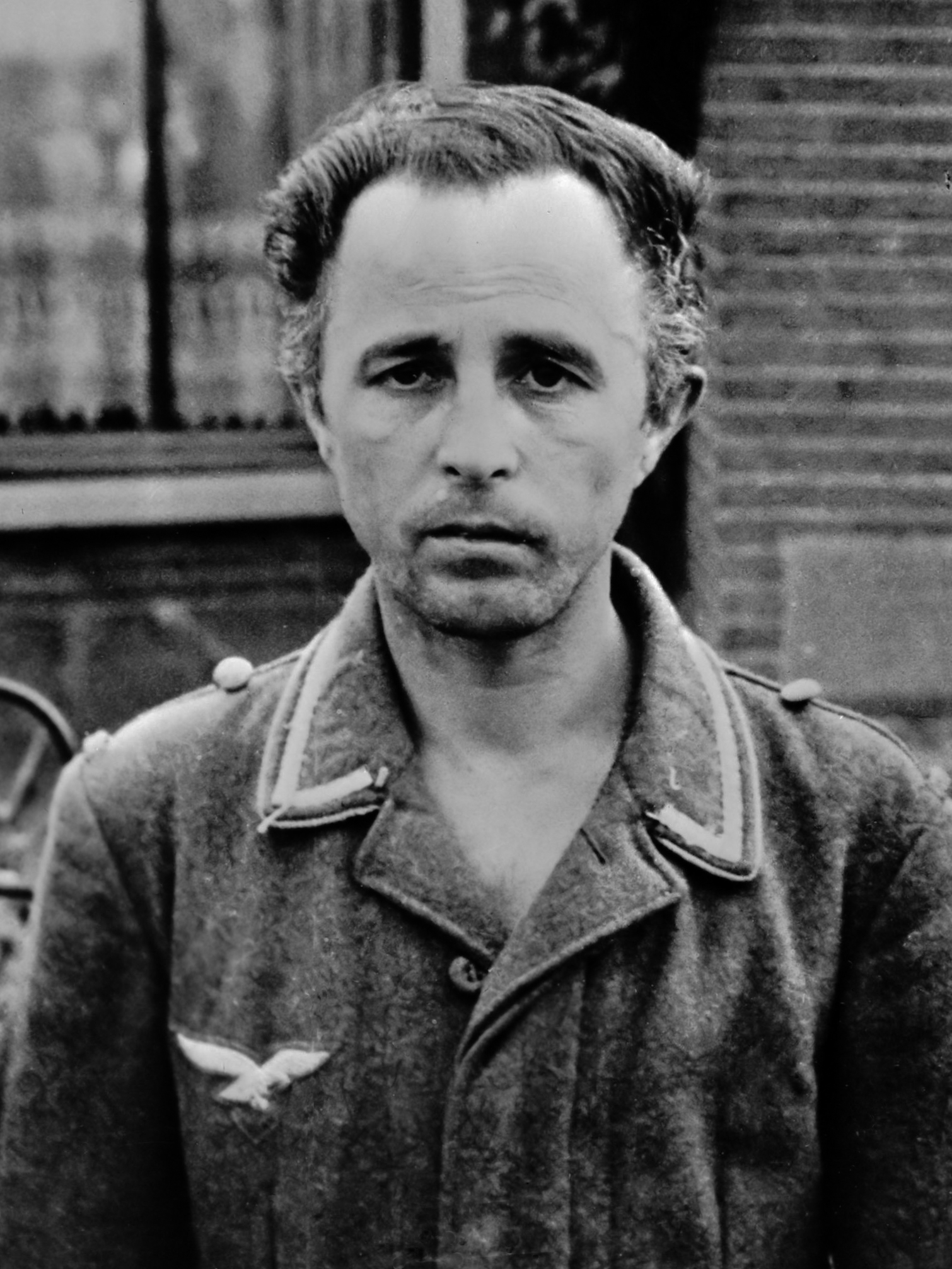
Kotalla in Amersfoort just after his arrest. He tried to disguise his SS identity by wearing a Luftwaffe uniform. (1945)

On 14 December 1948, Kotalla was sentenced to death by the Amsterdam Special Court. The Special Council of Cassation had Kotalla undergo a psychiatric examination by a neurologist, who concluded on 4 October 1949 that he was "not diminished" while committing his crimes and that "his nervous disposition cannot excuse the many ill-treatments he committed, since they too clearly exhibit a systematic character.” Partly on the basis of this conclusion, the death sentence was upheld on 5 December 1949.

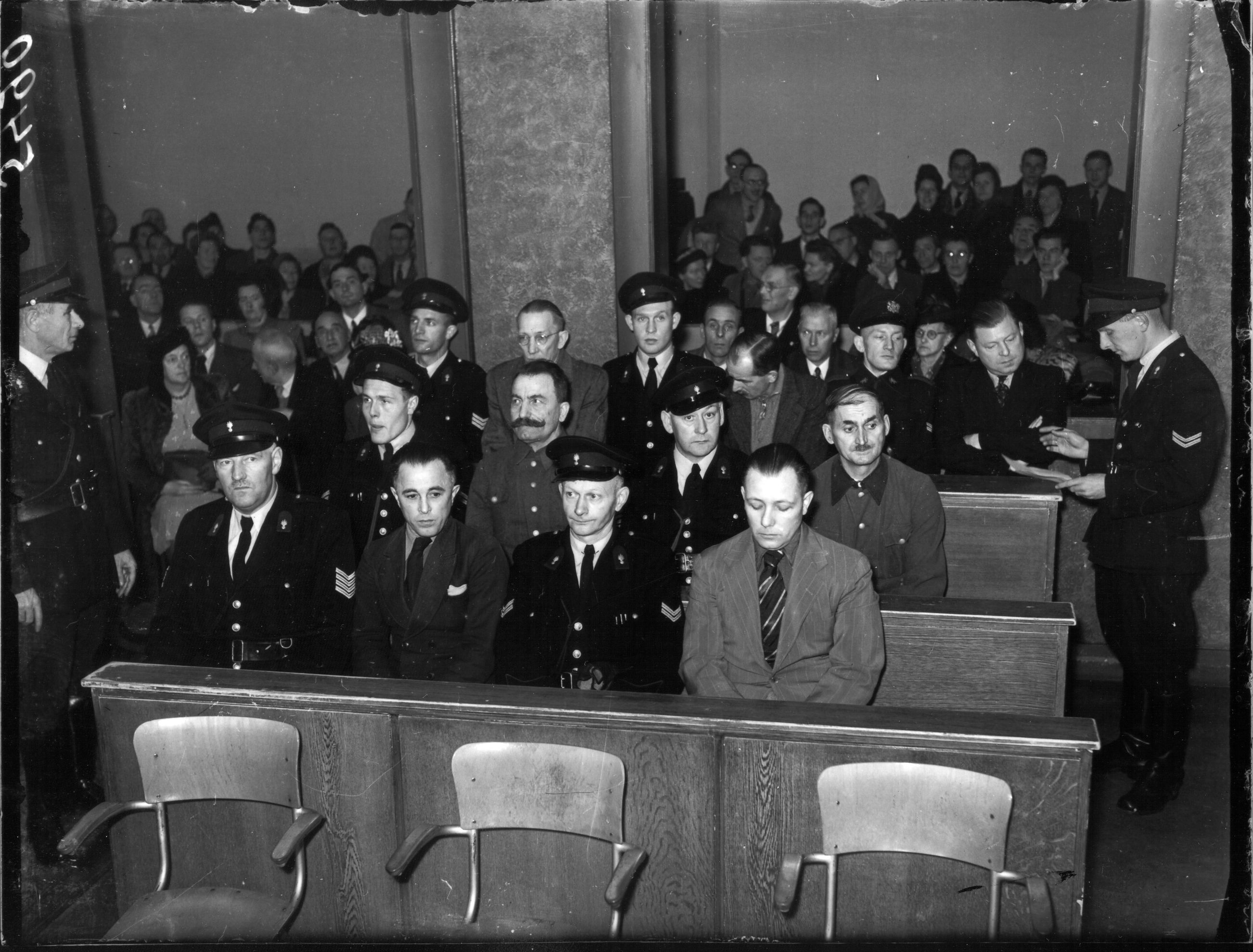
Joseph Kotalla (second from the left in the front row) at his trial on 16 November 1948

At the request of his lawyer, a second psychiatric examination was conducted which concluded in a report dated 18 March 1950 that he was indeed diminished. Finally, at the request of his counsel, Kotalla was examined by the psychiatrists Pieter Baan and Henricus Cornelius Rümke at the Psychiatric Observation Clinic in Utrecht. On 5 June 1951, they also indicated that Kotalla had diminished responsibility; according to them, Kotalla had a compulsive neurotic character that was partly a result of an "organic damage" of the central nervous system, as well as an "infantile sense of reality". The report stated: "Where a compulsive neurotic character is still complicated by an organic brain lesion, it is often the case that patients still have sufficient insight into the illegality of certain behaviors. In the wrong of their ways (even if they are stupid as the examinee clearly is), but on the grounds of disturbances as described above, they do experience such a disturbance in the exercise of their free will that they – less than the average normal – are unable to determine their will in accordance with any retained understanding of illegality. It is for this reason that we believe that Joseph Kotälla, while committing the offenses charged against him, suffered from some disturbances of his mental faculties such that these facts, if proved, will generally be imputed to him in a diminished degree."

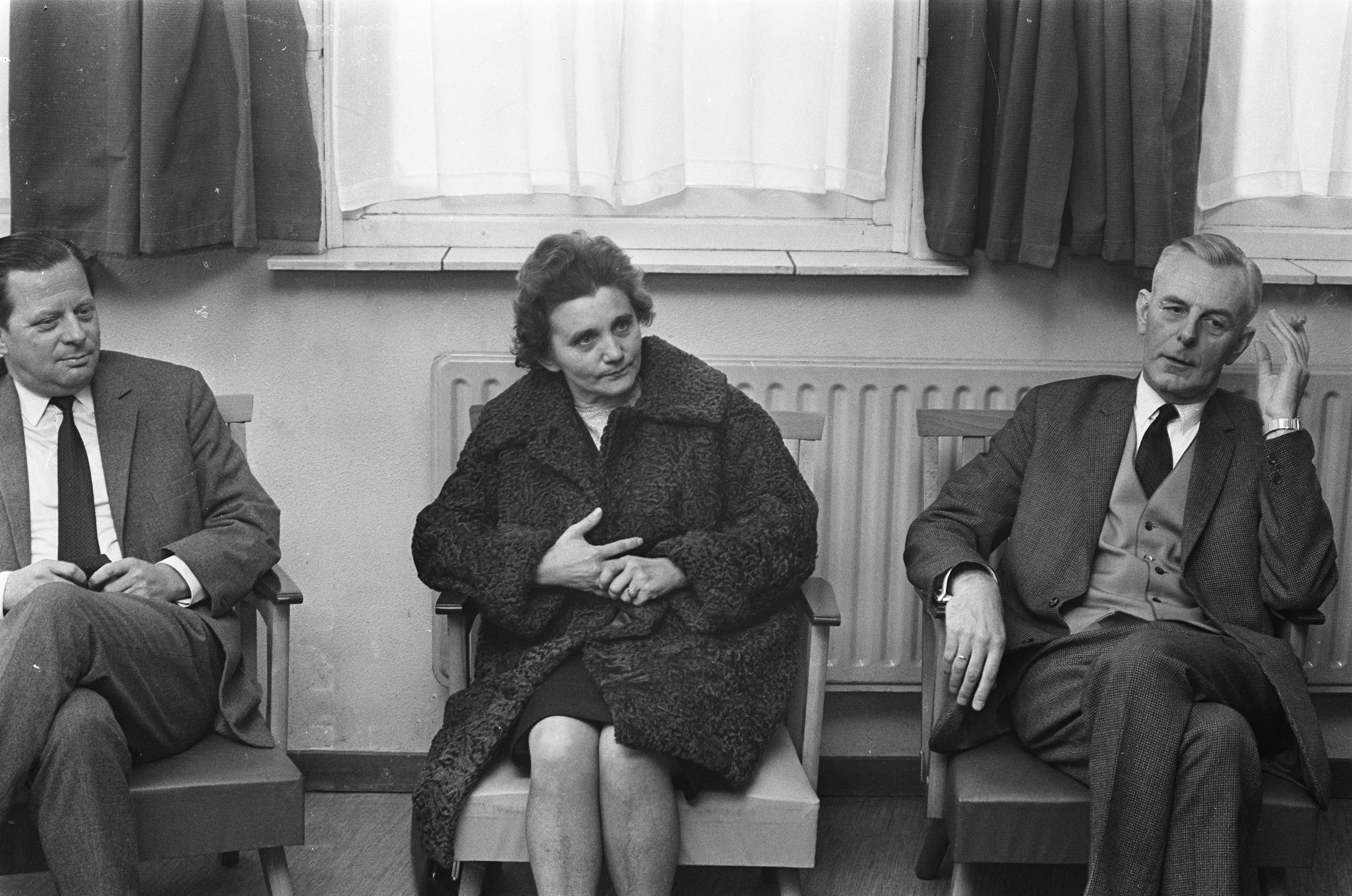
Kotalla's second wife after their wedding on 28 December 1966

On 5 December 1951, based on the latest psychiatric report, Kotalla's death sentence was commuted to life imprisonment by royal decree. He died in Breda Prison in 1979.

== Personal life ==
Kotalla met his first wife when he worked in Scheveningen prison, a woman from the German city of Kleve, whom he married in 1941. At the time of marriage she was 17 years old.
