= Capital punishment in the Netherlands =

Europe holds the greatest concentration of abolitionist states (blue). Map current as of 2022 Abolished for all offences Abolished in practice Retains capital punishment

Capital punishment in the Netherlands (Dutch: doodstraf in Nederland) was abolished in 1870 in criminal law after the States General recognized it to be "cruel and uncivilized". The bill was introduced by liberal-catholic Minister of Justice Franciscus van Lilaar and debated in both the Senate and House of Representatives for seven days before approval. Following the abolition of the death penalty, life imprisonment was made an official punishment in 1878.

A few years after gaining independence in 1815, the Kingdom of the Netherlands determined that the death penalty could be carried out through beheading. Between 1945 and 1952, 142 war criminals from World War II were sentenced to death by the Bijzonder Gerechtshof for treason of the State of the Netherlands and the deportation of Dutch Jews. Forty-two of the death sentences were carried out. The last persons to be executed under military law were SS officers Andries Jan Pieters and Artur Albrecht in March 1952. Capital punishment remained a legal military option until 1983 when it was explicitly forbidden in the Constitution of the Netherlands. In 1991, all references to the death penalty were removed from Dutch law.

Today the Netherlands operates a clear policy against capital punishment, not participating in extradition if the suspect has a chance of facing execution in the state seeking extradition.

== Constitution ==
- Article 114 of the Constitution (Dutch: Grondwet) prohibits sentencing someone to death since 1983. The exact provision in the original Dutch, De doodstraf kan niet worden opgelegd, translates to "The death penalty cannot be imposed". This means that as a result, the death penalty does not exist in the Netherlands. It also means that the death penalty cannot be added to future or existing law articles.

== Capital punishment today ==
The Reformed Political Party (Dutch: Staatkundig Gereformeerde Partij, SGP), a Christian right party, supports the reintroduction of the death penalty in the Netherlands. They base this on the Bible, specifically on Genesis 9:6, "Whoso sheddeth man's blood, by man shall his blood be shed: for in the image of God made he man," and Exodus 21:12, "He that smiteth a man, so that he dies, shall be surely put to death."

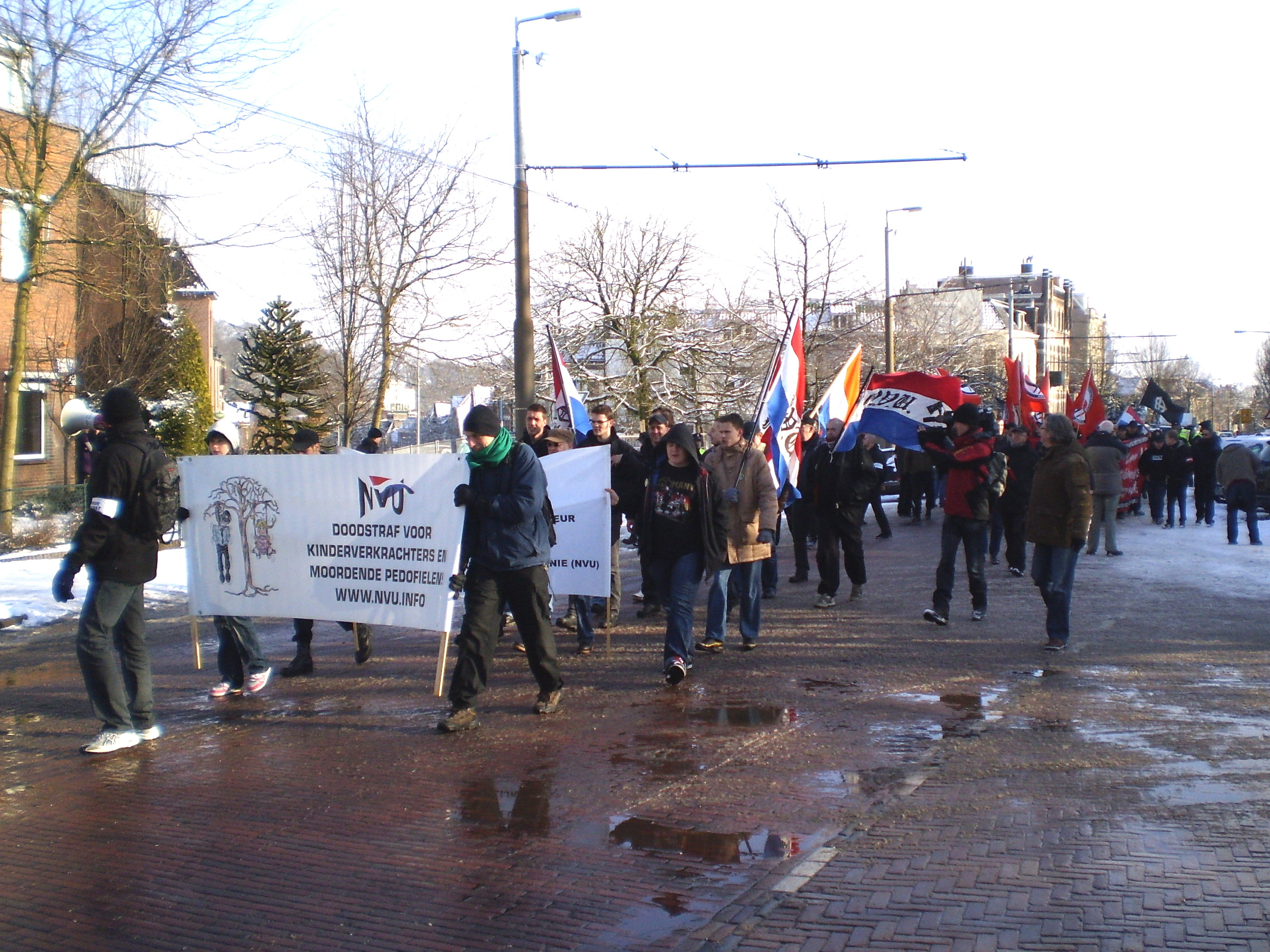
A NVU 2010 demonstration in Arnhem, propagating the "death penalty for child rapists and murderous pedophiles"

The Dutch People's Union (NVU) supports the reintroduction of the death penalty in the Netherlands.

== Last executed man and woman in the Netherlands ==
Executed person	Date of execution	Crime(s)	By	Where	Method
Ans van Dijk	January 14, 1948	Betrayal of 700 hiding Jews during World War II. She collaborated with the Sicherheitsdienst	Bijzonder Gerechtshof	Fort Bijlmer	Firing squad
Artur Albrecht and Andries Jan Pieters	March 21, 1952	SD-commander; torture and executions.	Bijzonder Gerechtshof	Waalsdorpervlakte	Firing squad

== See also ==
- 13 May 1945 German deserter execution, occurred in the Netherlands but was by German authorities enforcing German law upon German subjects
