= Weesperkarspel =

Former municipality in the Netherlands

Coordinates: 52°18′N 5°02′E

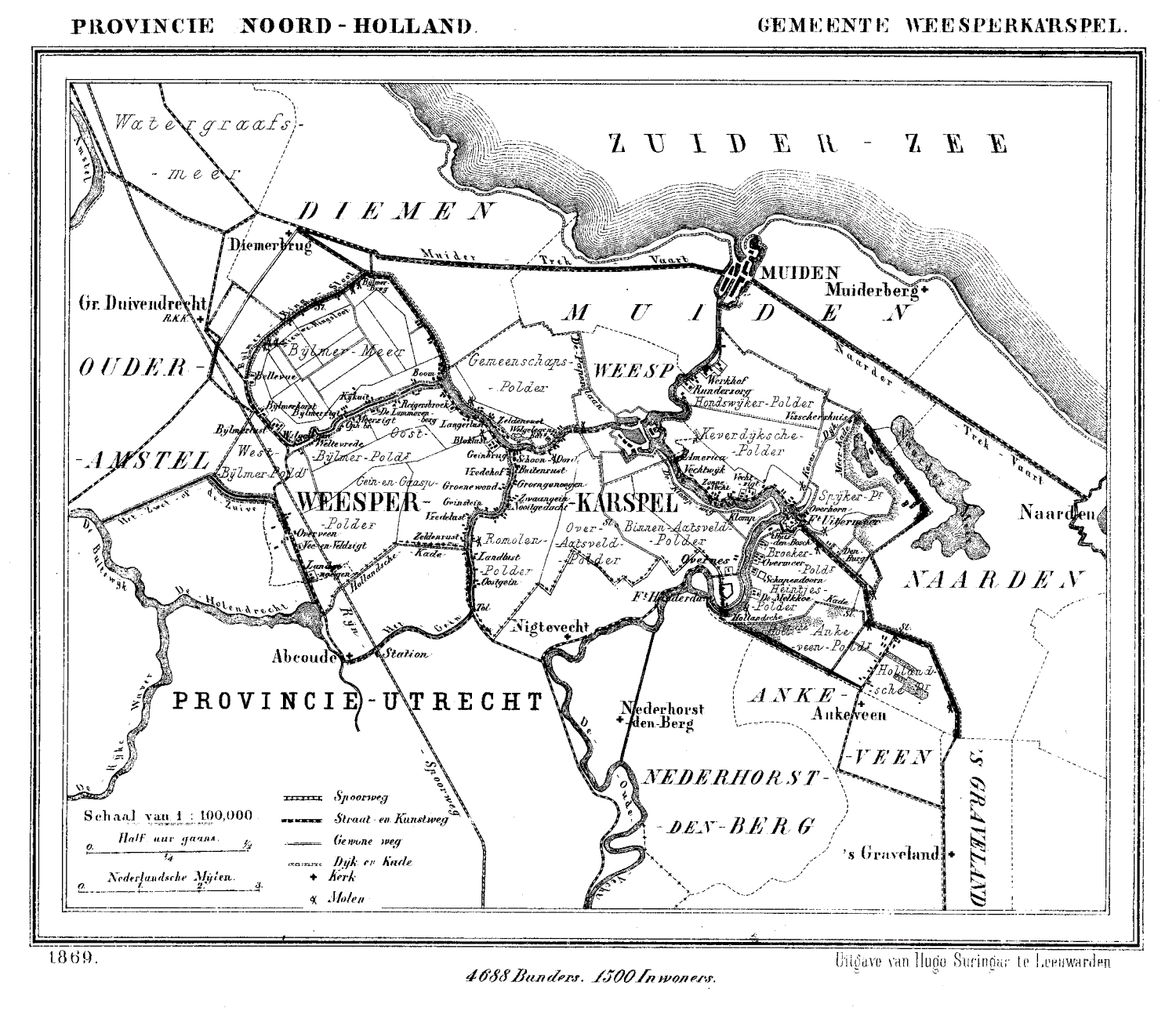
Map of Weesperkarspel, 1869

Coat of arms

Weesperkarspel is a former municipality in the province of North Holland, Netherlands. It existed from 1811 to 1966, when part of it was merged with Amsterdam as the location for development of the Bijlmermeer neighborhood in what was to eventually become the city's Zuidoost (southeastern) borough. Meanwhile, the parts east of the Amsterdam–Rhine Canal were merged with Weesp and Naarden. It has a population of 1,062 in 1811 and 1,693 in 1876.
