= Soviet prisoners of war =

The following articles deal with Soviet prisoners of war.

- Camps for Russian prisoners and internees in Poland (1919–24)
- Soviet prisoners of war in Finland during World War II (1939–45)
- Nazi crimes against Soviet prisoners of war during World War II (1941–45)
- Badaber Uprising of Soviet soldiers held in Pakistan in 1985
