= Death of Bertus de Man =

Bertus de Man (born c. 1987, died 16 January 2017) was a Dutch man who died after being arrested by the police for dangerous driving. The Public Prosecution Service (Dutch: Openbaar Ministerie) announced he had died of a cocaine overdose and his family disputed the account, saying excessive violence during the arrest had caused his death. In 2020, the court of appeal supported the police account.

== Incident ==
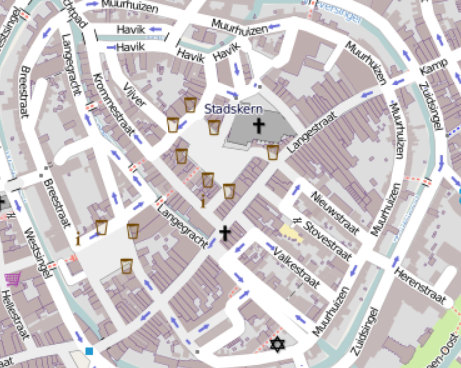
Langestraat goes from bottom left to top right on this map of central Amersfoort

Bertus de Man was a 30-year-old man living in Nijkerk, in the Netherlands. Late in the night of Sunday 15 January 2017, de Man was driving his car through central Amersfoort. When he failed to stop when asked to do so by the police, he was followed and arrested on the Langestraat for dangerous driving. According to the police account, he resisted arrest and was taken to the detention centre in Houten, where he became unwell in the cell. He was then taken to the St. Antonius hospital and died there on Monday 16 January.

== Aftermath ==
The Public Prosecution Service (Dutch: Openbaar Ministerie) announced on Thursday 19 January that de Man had died of a cocaine overdose and the injuries on his body could be explained by the actions of the medical team attempting to resuscitate him. The family of de Man disputed this version and asked forensic pathologist Frank van de Goot for a second opinion. On the Friday, one hundred mourners made a silent march through Amersfoort, which ended at the Langestraat. Members of the No Surrender Motorcycle Club attended. The family continued to press for an investigation into excessive force used during the arrest and claimed that the police discriminated against them because they lived on a trailer park.

== Legacy ==
In 2018, the Public Prosecution Service closed the investigation. It had decided that cocaine abuse was the cause of death and that the violence used by police officers during the arrest of de Man was proportionate and legal. The court of appeal in Arnhem supported this view in 2020, after a legal challenge by the family of de Man, which alleged that there was mobile telephone film footage of de Man lying lifeless on the ground after his arrest. Ferdinand Grapperhaus, Minister of Justice and Security, then denied suggestions made by members of the DENK political party that there was a pattern of police brutality which had resulted in the deaths of Ihsan Gürz, Rishi Chandrikasing, Mitch Henriquez and de Man.

== See also ==
- Death of Hans Kok
- Death of Ihsan Gürz
- Death of Paul Selier
- Killing of Mitch Henriquez
