= Death of Ihsan Gürz =

2011 death in Dutch police custody

On 2 July 2011, Ihsan Gürz (born c. 1989) died in a police cell in Beverwijk, the Netherlands, after being arrested by the police. He was found with no heartbeat, resuscitated and then taken to hospital, where he died. The official death cause and verdict of two judges is heart failure in combination with cocaine abuse; his family claims he was killed by police brutality. No police officers were convicted of wrongdoing and this judgement was upheld on appeal. His father Cengiz Gürz was later convicted of swearing at one of those officers. The case was at first little reported in the Netherlands, but became controversial in Turkey, where the government became involved.

== Death ==
Ihsan Gürz lived in Heemskerk in the Netherlands and was 22 years old. On 2 July 2011, he was arrested in a snack bar in Beverwijk after having a dispute with the owner about whether he could use the toilet whilst waiting for his food. The police were called and alleged he was violent in resisting arrest, a claim his family denied. He was agitated in the police cell and was visited twice by a doctor. On the second visit, Gürz had no heartbeat and was resuscitated; he was taken to hospital where he died. According to the police narrative, he had died of a heart attack. Gürz's family disputed this version of events, questioning why he had a broken nose and a shoe print on his chest. The family's lawyer noted that Gürz had walked out of the snackbar with the police officers, yet was dragged into the cell by them; what had happened in the meantime was not known.

== Reactions ==
Gürz's death was at first little reported in the Netherlands, but became a controversial issue in Turkey, where the media focused on the frequency of deaths of Turkish men in police cells in western Europe. The Dutch National Criminal Investigation Department launched an investigation and in reaction to the growing media uproar announced that it had found no evidence of police brutality.

Gürz's family said that video evidence showed police officers striking Gürz as he lay on the ground after being arrested. When the police responded that the evidence was inconclusive, the family replied that the footage had been clearer and it must have been tampered with. The pathologist said that the broken ribs and apparent shoe print on Gürz's chest were a result of the defibrillator being used by medics instead of being an indication of excessive police violence and that the likely cause of death was heart failure due to cocaine use. The family questioned why cocaine usage would lead to death on that particular occasion and not on others.

== Trial ==
At the first trial in 2012, the doctor and police officers were acquitted of any wrongdoing, with the death of Gürz attributed to cocaine abuse. The case was appealed and in 2014 the judgement was upheld. This led to the Turkish government suggesting it would launch its own investigation, since a more recent autopsy had blamed the death on police brutality and Gürz's father Cengiz had begun legal proceedings in Turkey, wanting to prosecute the doctor and the ten police officers present during the night of Gürz's death.

== Later events ==
In 2015, Cengiz Gürz requested the heart of his son, since when the body was taken to Turkey for a second autopsy, it was discovered that the heart was missing. After the killing of Mitch Henriquez by police in The Hague in 2015, the father said he sympathized with the pain felt by the family of Henriquez. In 2016, Cengiz Gürz was prosecuted after calling one of the officers present on the night of his son's death an "offspring of a whore" (Dutch: hoerenkind). He received a suspended prison sentence of three months, a conditional discharge of three years and had to pay the officer 2,000 euros in damages.

Ferdinand Grapperhaus, Minister of Justice and Security, denied suggestions made by members of the DENK political party in 2020 that there was a pattern of police brutality which had resulted in the deaths of Gürz, Rishi Chandrikasing, Mitch Henriquez and Bertus de Man.

== See also ==
- Death of Bertus de Man
- Death of Hans Kok
- Death of Paul Selier
- Killing of Mitch Henriquez
