= Death of Paul Selier =

Paul Selier (born c. 1979) lived in the Hague in the Netherlands. Early in the morning of 2 February 2018, Selier encountered police officers in Waddinxveen and died whilst being arrested. A year later, the official investigation announced that excessive police violence had not been used and Selier had taken cocaine.

== Incident ==
Selier lived in the Hague with his family. He had two children with his wife. He worked as a car dealer and also had a stall where he sold herring. Early in the morning of 2 February 2018, Selier was seen by eyewitnesses on the Oude Dreef in Waddinxveen, in a confused state. At 05:30 he was in his car, screaming and hitting the steering wheel; at 05:45 he was sitting in the road. Dutch police officers arrived at 05:50. He was ordered to lie on his stomach and when he did not do so, the officers started beating him, in an incident recorded by a passerby. The film showed one officer striking Selier repeatedly whilst the restrained man screamed.

At first, the police told the family that Selier had collapsed and died whilst being arrested, but then the footage of the officers beating Selier was shared with Omroep West. After initially refusing to comment, the Public Prosecution Service announced it would investigate. Shocked by the violence, a friend of Selier's organized a march in the Hague on 19 February, to protest against police brutality. An investigation by the Brabants Dagblad revealed that Selier was known to the police as a cocaine user who often had breakdowns and in January he had been observed acting strangely in Scheveningen harbour. On that occasion, he eventually jumped into the water and had to be rescued by six firemen.

One year later, the Rijksrecherche (National Criminal Investigation Department) reported that Selier had not died as a result of excessive police violence and the Public Prosecution Service announced it would not reveal the cause of death, as requested by the family. Selier's blood had been found to contain cocaine. The family's lawyer stated they accepted the decision and would be making a complaint against the police.

== See also ==
- Death of Bertus de Man
- Death of Hans Kok
- Death of Ihsan Gürz
- Killing of Mitch Henriquez
