= Death of Hans Kok =

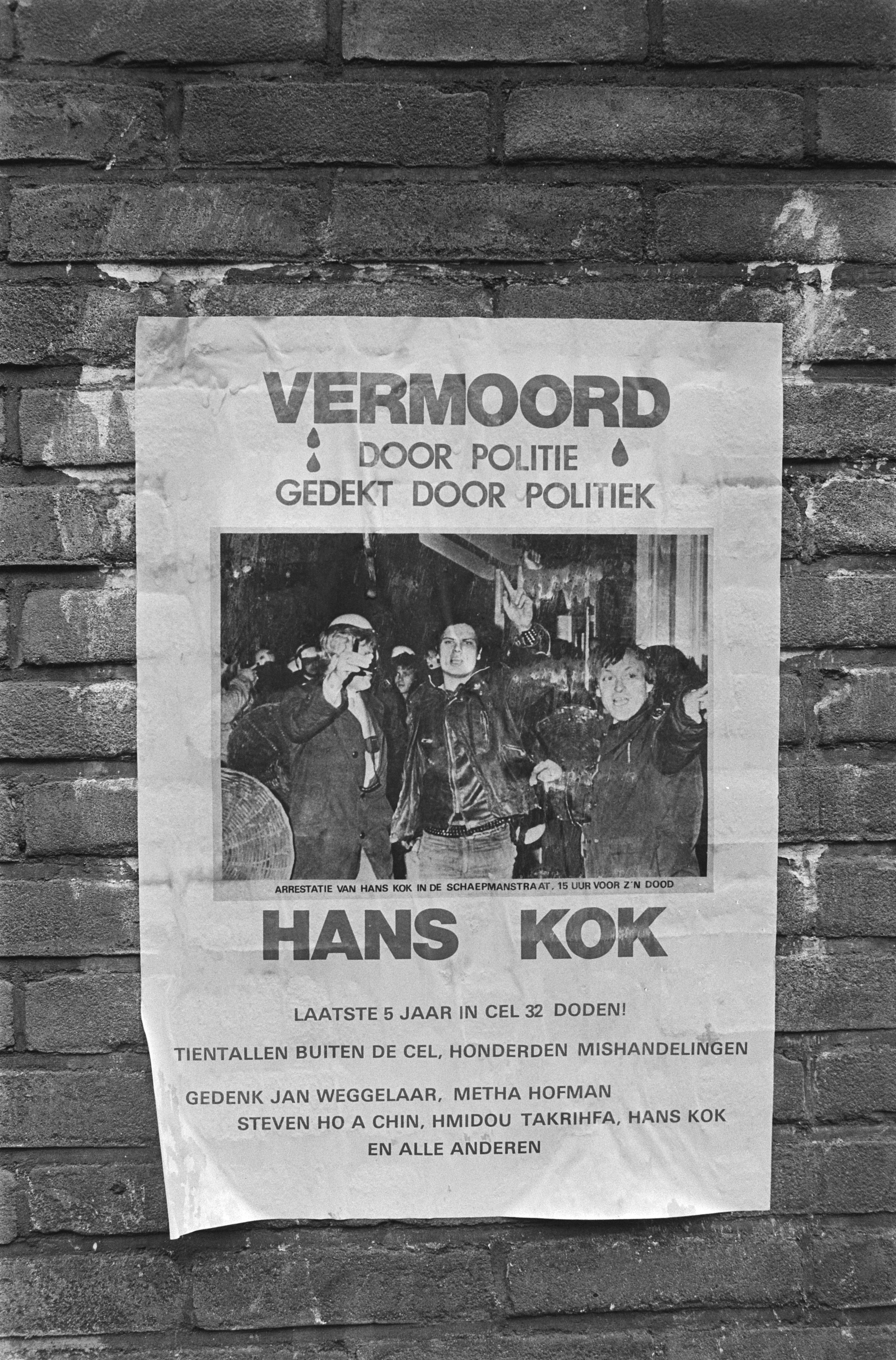
A poster declares Kok's death was murder

The death of Hans Kok (c. 1962-1985) occurred in the night of 24 October 1985, after he had been arrested in Amsterdam. The young squatter died in a police cell and the Dutch squatters movement believed he had been murdered. The following weekend, there were 40 arson attacks across the city and solidarity actions from other places. No prison officers faced charges; Kok's death has been memorialised in book, film and music.

== Death of Hans Kok ==
In the early 1980s, the Dutch squatters movement was at its peak with thousands of people living in squats; in the capital Amsterdam squatters were involved in events such as the coronation riots and the Vondelstraat riots. The Staatsliedenbuurt, a central district in the west of Amsterdam, was heavily squatted. On Van Beuningenstraat, almost an entire block was occupied and there were self-managed social centres such as De Rioolrat (the Sewer Rat). When Mayor of Amsterdam Ed van Thijn visited the Staatsliedenbuurt in December 1984, he was confronted by 200 squatters on Joan Melchior Kemperstraat, where he was shoved and spat at. When the footage was shown on national television that evening, it caused public outrage which urged a crackdown on the squatters movement.

Hans Kok was 23 years old and lived one street over from Van Beuningenstraat at Cliffordstraat 23. On 24 October 1985, the police evicted a squatted apartment at Schaepmanstraat 59-1. The eviction was contested by local squatters; in the melee, the police fired shots and over 30 protestors were arrested, one being Hans Kok. Photographed being arrested, he looked to be in good health and was making the V sign. He was then placed in a cell overnight and was found dead at noon the next day.

== Legacy ==
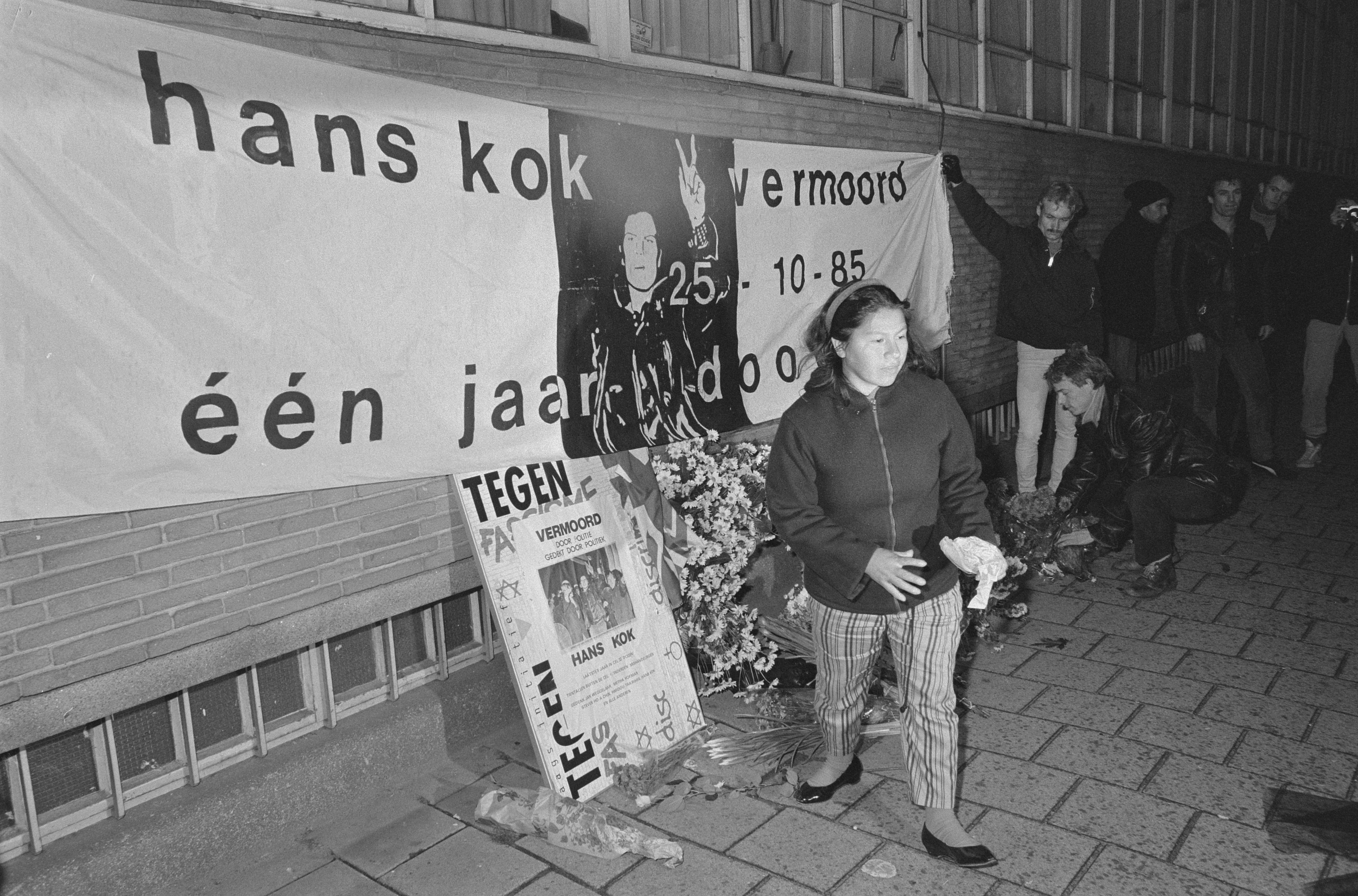
A demonstration to mark the one year anniversary of Kok's death

Kok's lawyer blamed the police for his death and squatters across the Netherlands reacted with anger: in Amsterdam, there were 40 arson attacks on government and police buildings; in Utrecht windows were smashed; in Nijmegen burning tyres were thrown onto the motorway. In Hamburg, Germany, squatters in St. Pauli hung banners saying "Amsterdam 24-10: Comrade murdered in cell".

Kok was buried after a secret funeral on 29 October since the authorities wanted to avoid more unrest. Two weeks after his death, the police received a night-time warning that there was a bomb in the house next door to Van Thijn's home at Herengracht 502. The mayor was woken up and evacuated; a police search revealed two incendiary bombs timed to go off in thirty minutes, located in the room adjacent to Van Thijn's bedroom. The foiled attack was only made public in 2003, when Van Thijn published his memoirs.

In November 1985, Kok's family demanded that the names of the officers who had interacted with him were released and requested the autopsy report. Minister of Justice Frits Korthals Altes said that he could not be sure that the police had behaved within the remit of the law. A year later, Van Thijn decided not to bring charges against three of the prison officers present on the night of Kok's death. After inquiries had investigated, the conclusion was that Kok had died from a combination of factors: the cold cell, alcohol and drug use, tiredness and the failure of officers to check on him.

The post-punk band The Ex recorded a tribute song to Kok entitled in 1987. The author A. F. Th. van der Heijden was inspired to write the 1990 novel Advocaat van de Hanen by his death. The following year, the film-maker Barbara den Uyl directed In naam der wet which reconstructed the events surrounding Kok's death.

As of 2023, an apartment on the van Hallstraat in the Staatsliedenbuurt cost €675,000.

== See also ==
- Death of Bertus de Man
- Death of Ihsan Gürz
- Death of Klaus-Jürgen Rattay
- Death of Paul Selier
- Killing of Mitch Henriquez
