= Bart Koet =

Professor

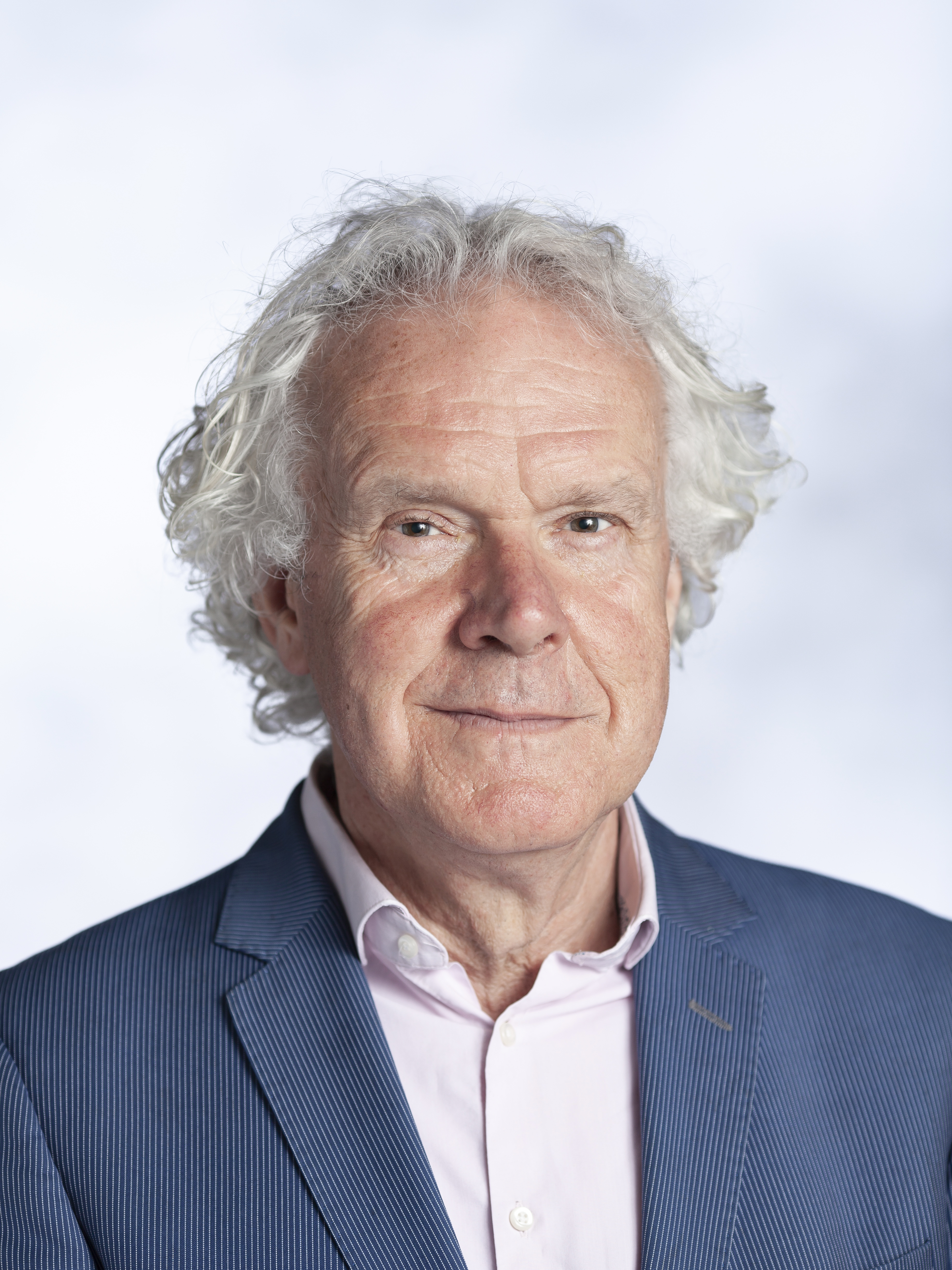
Bart Koet

Bartholomeüs Johannes (Bart) Koet (born 28 July 28, 1955 in Alkmaar) was Professor of New Testament and Early Christian Literature at Tilburg University and the Dean of Research at the same institution. He was the president of the Centre for the Study of Early Christianity together with Bert Jan Lietaert Peerbolte of the Vrije Universiteit. He is since 2016 chairman of Studiosorum Novi Testamenti Conventus, the society of New Testament scholars of the Netherlands and Flanders. He is member of the Society of New Testament Studies.

== Career ==
After high school, Koet studied theology and philosophy at the Catholic Theological University and the University of Amsterdam and biblical studies at the Pontificio Istituto Biblico in Rome. In 1989 he obtained his doctorate in Heerlen with a dissertation on scriptural interpretation in Luke-Acts.

From 1989 on Koet worked as post doc in Utrecht and Amsterdam (KTHU & KTHA) and from 1994 he worked there as assistant professor New Testament. In 2009 he became a professor by special appointment on Early Christian Literature at Tilburg University. In 2013 he also became full professor of New Testament at the same institution. From 2019 until his retirement Koet was the Dean of Research at the Tilburg School of Catholic Theology.

Koet started in the parish ministry of the Westland region, after obtaining his master's degree. From 1989 until 2005, he became a prison chaplain in the (in)famous Bijlmer Bajes in Amsterdam. During this time he focused on the study of dreams, after he discovered how important dreams were for prisoners. In 2011 and 2015 he was involved with the organization of the international conference of the International Association for the Study of Dreams.

In the last decades, Koet has dedicated himself also to the study of leadership in the early church and the role of diakonia during the conception of the New Testament. In 2009 he, along with prof. dr. Paul van Geest, organized the XXXVIII Incontro di Studiosi dell’Antichità Cristiana with the title: Διακονíα, diaconiae, diaconato semantica e storia. The conference was organized as a joint-venture by both the Faculty of Catholic Theology (Tilburg) and the Istituto Patristico Augustinianum (Rome).

Since then he became one of the leading experts on the hidden history of the deaconate. He published an English book about Augustine and his material on deacons. The book is also published in a Spanish translation. He edited several volumes on the sources of the deaconate in the Early Church. Those books are considered to be the first attempt to map the literary and material sources regarding deacons (M/F).

== Personal life ==
Bart Koet lives in Utrecht and is a deacon of the diocese Haarlem-Amsterdam.

== Publications (selection) ==
- On the Jewish origin of the New Testament: Five Studies on the Interpretation of Scriptures in Luke-Acts, Leuven: Peeters Publishers, 1989. ISBN 978-9068311891 (Dissertation)
- Editor with S. Moyise & J. Verheyden, The Scriptures of Israel in Jewish and Christian Tradition, Leiden: Brill, 2013.
- Geloofwaardig dromen: over bijbelse en rabijnse visies op dromen, Hilversum: Folkertsma Sichting, 2002. ISBN 9789080601338
- Editor, Dreams as Divine Communication in Christianity: from Hermas to Aquinas, Leuven: Peeters Publishers, 2012.
- Editor with K. Adams & B. Koning, Dreams and Spirituality: a Handbook for Ministry, Spiritual Direction and Counseling, London: Canterbury Press, 2015.
- On Diakonia and leadership in the early church: Editor with P.J.J. van Geest & V. Grossi, Diakonia, diaconiae and the diaconate: Semantica e storia nei padri della chiesa, Rome: Augustinianum, 2010.
- Augustinus over diakens: Zijn visie op het diaconaat, Almere: Parthenon, 2014.
- Ed Bart J. Koet, Edwina Murphy & Esko Ryökäs, Deacons and Diakonia in Early Christianity: The First Two Centuries, Tübingen: Mohr Siebeck, 2018.
- The Go-Between: Augustine on Deacons, Leiden: Brill, 2019.
- Deacons and Diakonia in Late Antiquity The Third Century Onwards, Ed. Bart J. Koet, Edwina Murphy, and Esko Ryökäs, eds., (WUNT II 606, Tübingen, Mohr Siebeck, 2024)

=== Sources ===
- Koet, Bart J. (1989). Five Studies on Interpretation of Scripture in Luke-Acts. Leuven: University Press. ISBN 978-90-6186-330-4.
- Koet, Bart J. (2006). Dreams and Scripture in Luke-Acts: Collected Essays. Peeters. ISBN 978-90-429-1750-7.
- Two books are part of the sources in the article: Luke the Evangelist
