= Killing of Sammy Baker =

2020 killing by Dutch police

Sammy Baker
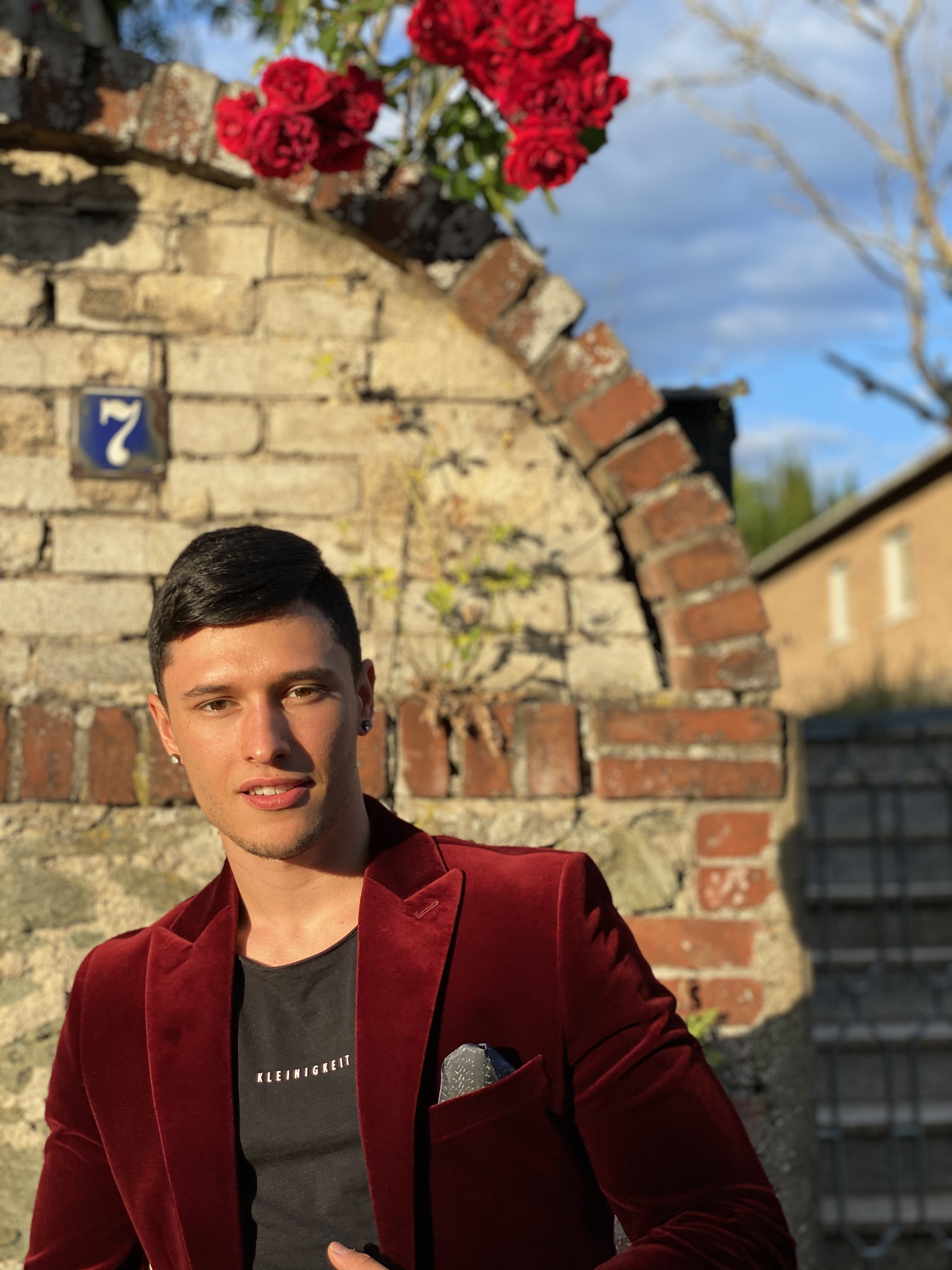
- Seewald photographed in 2020
- Born: Samuel Seewald; 11 August 1997; Giessen, Germany
- Died: 13 August 2020 (aged 23); Amsterdam, Netherlands
- Cause of death: Gunshot wounds
- Occupations: Instagram personality; bodybuilder

Samuel Seewald (11 August 1997 – 13 August 2020) was a German man shot dead in Amsterdam by police officers on 13 August 2020. He was known as Sammy Baker on Instagram where he was an influencer with 170,000 followers. Seewald had travelled to Amsterdam to celebrate his birthday and after smoking cannabis with friends, had become psychotic. His mother travelled to meet him and he ran away from her, before being shot by police in controversial circumstances. The Amsterdam chief of police claimed he had stabbed an officer, whilst his parents claimed he was the victim of a racist murder.

== Killing ==
Samuel Seewald was born on 11 August 1997, to parents Justine and Kai in Giessen, Germany. Raised in Wetzlar, he developed interests in sports and music, becoming a bodybuilder in his teens. He started an Instagram account under the name Sammy Baker which grew to have 170,000 followers, making him an influencer. Seewald had been visiting Amsterdam to celebrate his birthday when he disappeared on 11 August. It was later assumed that he had legally smoked cannabis with friends and had become psychotic. He acted in a paranoid manner and lost contact with his friends.

His mother was concerned about his welfare and travelled from Germany to the Netherlands. She managed to locate him in the borough of Amsterdam Nieuw-West and after an encounter which occurred in her car at 14:45 on 12 August, he ran away. She asked a passing policeman for help and her son ran away again. Seewald ended up in a small park surrounded by residential buildings at the Honselersdijkstraat. There was a tense discussion between Seewald and police officers that lasted around 15 minutes, which was observed by a journalist who happened to be looking out of their window. The journalist stated Seewald was dressed in boxer shorts and a T-shirt, and was holding an object to his neck. The police said this was a small knife with which Seewald had been cutting himself.

As his mother stood nearby, an ambulance with mental health workers arrived but they stayed behind the police who had their guns drawn whilst Seewald allegedly held the knife to his throat. He tried to climb a fence and was pepper-sprayed by an officer, then sat on the ground for around 10 minutes whilst the police waited for negotiators to arrive. At 16:50, Seewald stood up again. Eight minutes later, he began to walk slowly towards officers who were pointing their guns at him. A police dog handler approached from behind and when the dog ran past Seewald, the officer tackled him. In the melee, Seewald was shot two times whilst on the ground, then taken to hospital where he died of his injuries. The Dutch media reported the claims of the Amsterdam police chief, Frank Paauw, that Seewald had attacked a police officer with the knife. Other than the journalist, no witnesses to the killing were interviewed and the police bodycam footage was found to be defective.

== Aftermath ==
Friends of Seewald immediately set up a memorial and a campaign called Justice for Sammy. His father commented "What I think: The Amsterdam police murdered my son". The parents publicly questioned the police narrative, asking why Seewald had been shot and if there was a racist motive. Elnathan Prinsen of the Dutch Association for Psychiatry commented that the police had not behaved in a manner which could have de-escalated the situation.

In 2021, hundreds of people attended a demonstration in Amsterdam marking one year since the killing. The parents of Seewald made a complaint against Frank Paauw because he had refused to apologise for his statements about how Seewald had attacked a police officer with a knife. There was no damage to the officer's jacket, a fact which was confirmed by two investigations by the National Criminal Investigation Department. In 2022, Paauw appeared in front of the National Police Complaints Commission. The family demanded that he resigned; the commission upheld the complaint and Paauw said his comments should have been more reserved.

Seewald's parents announced in 2022 that they would consider further legal action pending the outcome of an independent investigation. A year later they announced they were unhappy with the report by a sociologist and had engaged the British group Forensic Architecture to investigate. Forensic Architecture concluded that Seewald was shot dead whilst lying on the ground and the police officers had not been in danger. These findings were disputed by the police; in 2024, the Public Prosecution Service decided not to prosecute any officers. In September 2025, the police made an undisclosed settlement with the parents.

== See also ==
- Killing of Michael Koomen
- Killing of Mitch Henriquez
- Killing of Rishi Chandrikasing
