= Criminal justice system of the Netherlands =

Overview of criminal justice system in the Netherlands

The criminal justice system of the Netherlands is the system of practices and institutions of the Netherlands directed at upholding social control, deterring and mitigating crime, and sanctioning those who violate laws with criminal penalties and rehabilitation efforts. The Netherlands' criminal code is based on the Napoleonic Code, imposed during the time of the French Empire. The Dutch largely kept the Napoleonic Code after their independence, but tempered it with a significantly more rehabilitative penological focus.

Law enforcement in the Netherlands is provided by the national police force. The police make use of over 50,000 individuals, employed in a number of regional and specialist departments. The States General crafts rules to manage the police, while the Minister of Justice and Security is responsible for the central administration of the police. The national police commissioner is vested with the day-to-day management of the police force.

The judiciary comprises eleven district courts, four courts of appeal, two administrative courts (Centrale Raad van Beroep and the College van beroep voor het bedrijfsleven) and a Supreme Court that has 41 judges. All judicial appointments are made by the government. Judges are nominally appointed for life, but in practice retire at age 70. The Council of State is a constitutionally established advisory body to the government, which consists of members of the royal family and Crown-appointed members generally having political, commercial, diplomatic, or military experience. The Supreme Court of the Netherlands is the highest court of the Netherlands, Curacao, Sint Maarten and Aruba. The Court sits in The Hague, Netherlands and presides over civil, criminal and tax-related cases.

== Police ==
=== Organization ===
From the end of 1945 until 1993, the Dutch police was composed of the gemeentepolitie (municipal police) and the rijkspolitie (state police). In 1993, the police were reorganised into 25 regional forces and the Dutch National Police Agency (KLPD). In total, the police employ over 40,000 individuals. The 25 regional forces are responsible for police care in their respective region in the Netherlands. Each force comprises a number of regional and specialist departments, such as the Juvenile and Vice Squad, the Criminal Intelligence Service and the Aliens Police. The KLPD is responsible for the supervision and surveillance of the motorways, airways, and waterways, as well as providing security for the Royal Family.

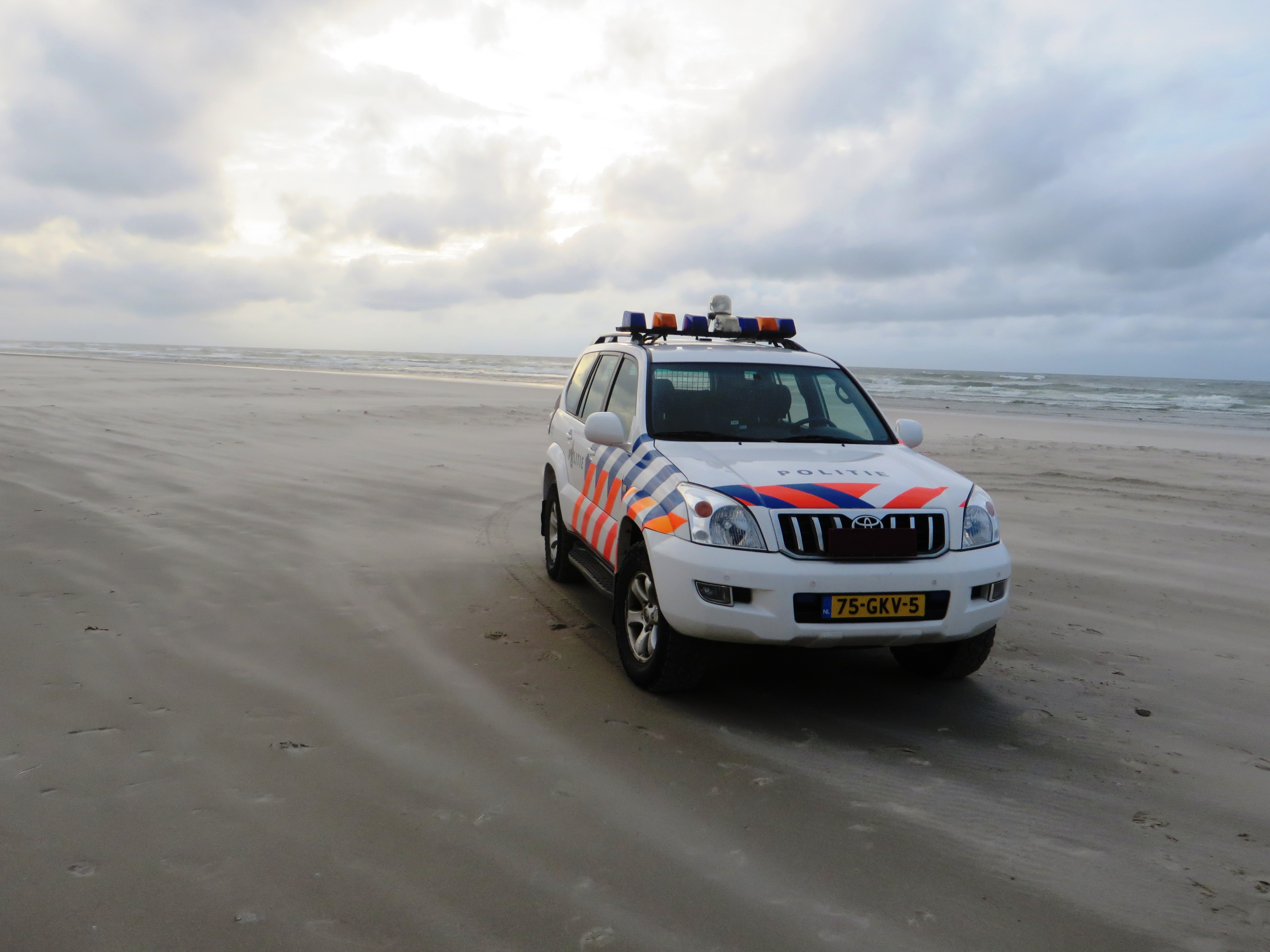
Local police car in Terschelling

In the event of serious emergencies, the police cooperate with the fire brigade, ambulance service and other government agencies in the security region that corresponds to the police region. The police in a municipality are available 24 hours every day for basic law enforcement. The Dutch government is keen to put more police "on the street." The uniformed policemen on the street are those of the patrol service. Surveillance is frequently done from patrol cars, horses, and motorbikes. Since the early 1990s several police regions have been working with neighborhood teams called neighborhood supervisors.

The States General crafts rules to manage the police, while the Minister of the Interior is responsible for the central administration of the police. One of the burgemeesters in a region is the force administrator. The chief public prosecutor and the force administrator have the ultimate responsibility for the administration of the police force. The regional chief of police however, is vested with the day-to-day management of the police force. When investigating crime, police follow the instructions of the public prosecutor—a member of the Public Prosecution Service. The Public Prosecution Service, under the auspices of the Ministry of Justice, is responsible for maintaining order. Police traditionally carry a baton, handcuffs, and a firearm; regulations are in place restricting the use of violence in general and firearms in particular.

=== Enforcement ===
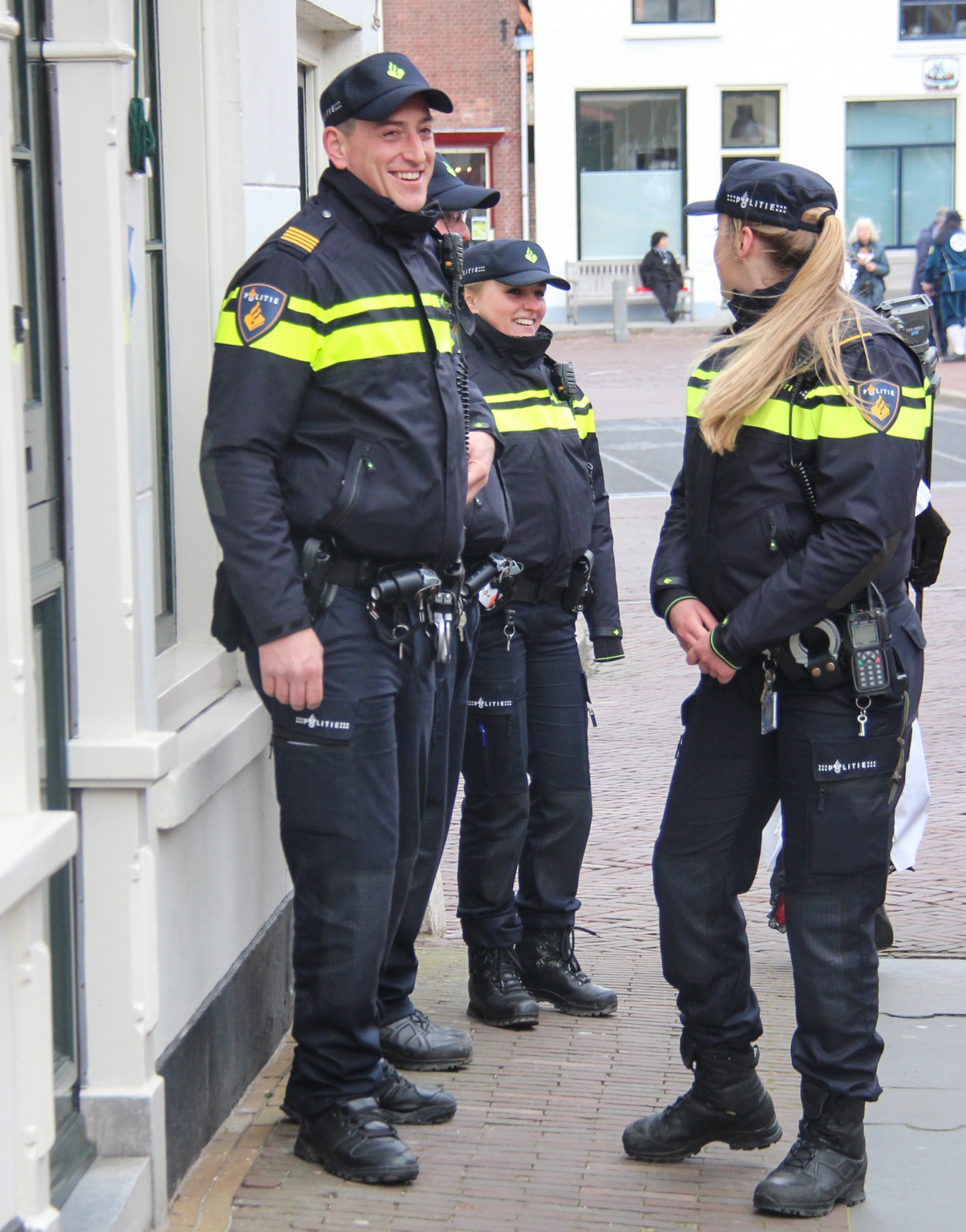
Police officers

Basic police work includes responsibility for maintaining a visible presence on the street, on foot, or in a marked car. Police are also responsible for basic detective work, such as investigating thefts and burglaries. Police frequently deal with traffic issues, including those of surveillance, accidents, congestion security, and advising citizens and municipalities. Responsibility also rests with the police to maintain laws and regulations. This may take the form of checking whether foreigners are in possession of the right documents.

In 1970, the police cleared forty percent of all crimes; however since 2005 around 26 percent of crimes were cleared.

== Judicial system ==
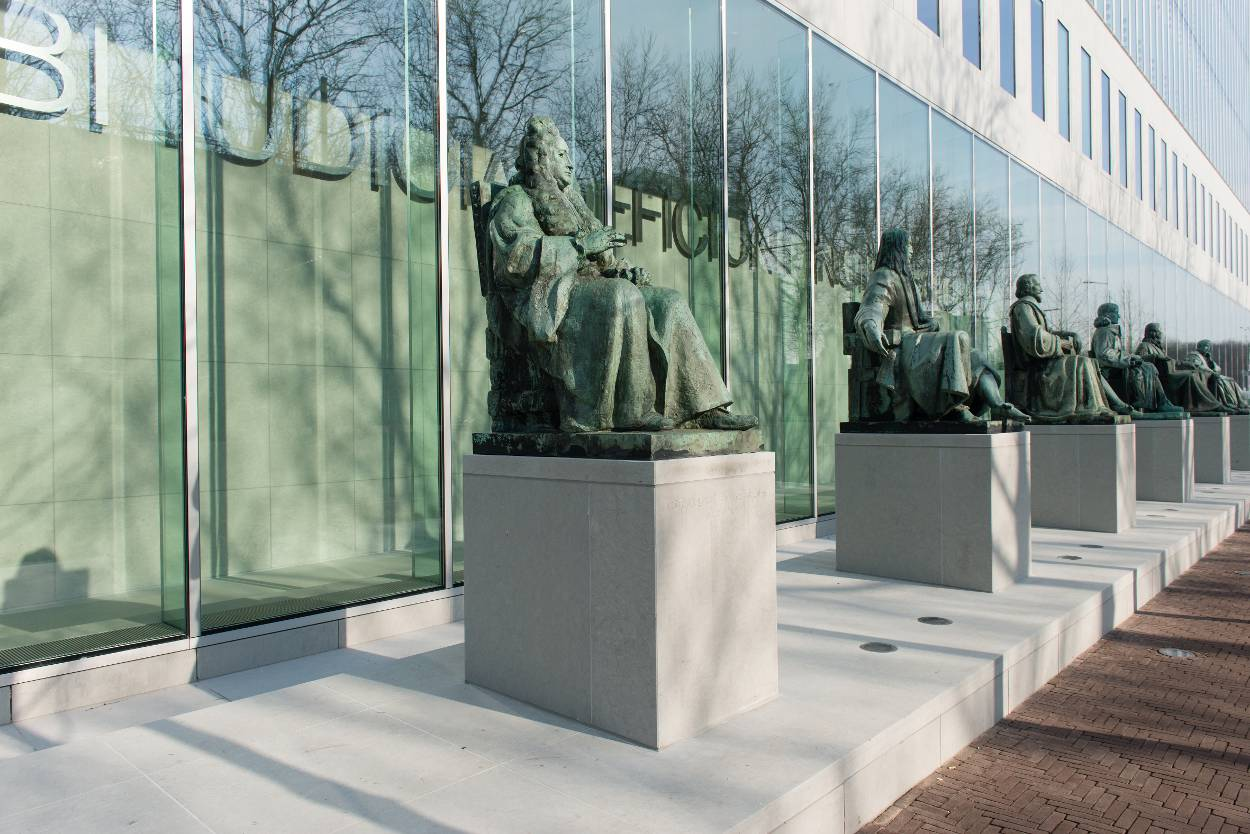
Supreme Court of the Netherlands

The judiciary comprises 11 district courts, four courts of appeal, two administrative courts (Centrale Raad van Beroep and the College van beroep voor het bedrijfsleven) and the Supreme Court which has 41 judges. All judicial appointments are made by the Government. Judges are nominally appointed for life, but in practice retire at age 70.

The Raad van State (Council of State) is a constitutionally established advisory body to the government, which consists of members of the royal family and Crown-appointed members generally having political, commercial, diplomatic, or military experience. The Council of State must be consulted by the cabinet on proposed legislation before a law is submitted to the parliament. The Council of State Administrative Law section also serves as an appellate court for citizens against executive branch decisions. The King is Chairman of the Council of State, but he seldom chairs meetings. The Vice-Chairman of the Council of State chairs meetings in the King's absence. Under Dutch Constitutional Law the Vice-Chairman of the Council is acting Head of State when there is no Monarch; e.g. if the Royal Family were to become extinct.

For criminal law, the independent Hoge Raad is the highest court of the Netherlands, as well as Aruba, Curaçao and Sint Maarten. The Court was established on 1 October 1838 and sits in The Hague, Netherlands. The jurisdiction of the Supreme Court is limited primarily to civil, criminal and tax-related cases. The Court has the authority to overturn rulings by appellate courts (cassation) and therefore establishes case law, but only if the lower court applied the law incorrectly or the ruling lacks sufficient reasoning; facts are no longer subject of discussion. The Court may not rule on the constitutionality of laws passed by the States-General and treaties. Hence the Netherlands has no constitutional court.

== Penal system ==
=== History of Dutch penology ===
The origins of the current Dutch criminal code date back to 1811 when the Netherlands was incorporated into the French Empire.

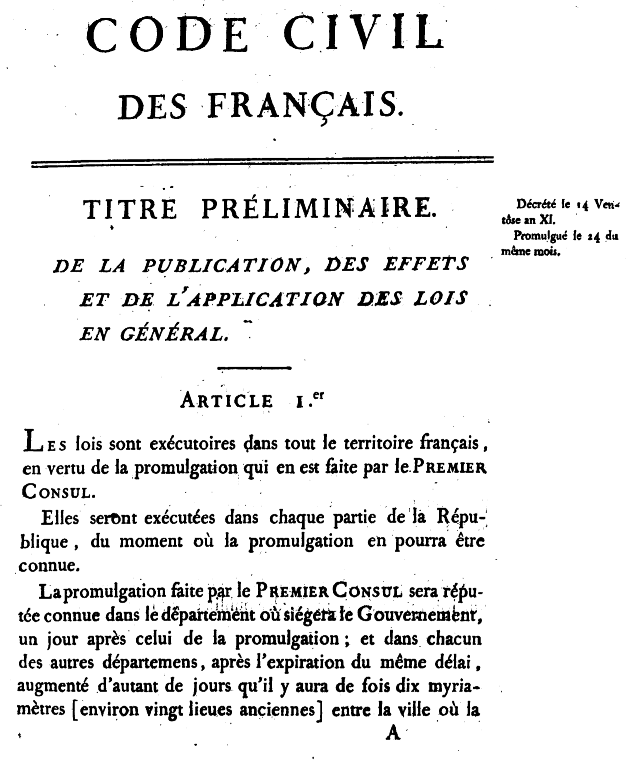
First page of the 1804 original edition of the Napoleonic Code.

After the Dutch gained independence, the Napoleonic Code was largely kept but the philosophy underlying these criminal sanctions changed. Specifically, a more humane system replaced Criminal Justice System of France. Nineteenth century Dutch prisons did not distinguish between adult and juvenile offenders; offenders regularly resided in common quarters. Subsequent to Dutch independence, these practices grew out of favour as they failed to conform to the Dutch conception of punishment. A group of concerned citizens assembled the Dutch Association for the Moral Improvement of Prisoners to combat the frequently harsh prison environment. The organisation's focus was to make prisons more humane by advocating training for offenders, specifically that of a religious and educational nature. These rehabilitative goals persisted well into the 20th century.

The origins of Dutch juvenile penology lay in the extensive welfare system developed in the 16th century. In preindustrial Dutch society, child upbringing was the responsibility of the parents, not the state. This meant that the state did not intervene in issues classified as the responsibility of the family. However, when children moved out of the home and into the factory, the state asserted a greater interest in their well-being. As the state's interest in youths grew, Dutch society implemented an educational and rehabilitative system to nurture that interest. From the late 19th century to early 20th century, a variety of practices were created to stress a rehabilitative model for juveniles. The 1901 Penal Children's Act highlighted this trend by requiring the rehabilitation of delinquent children. Consequently, youth was now perceived as a mitigating factor in sentencing, and the death penalty for juveniles was abolished. This Act also reduced the formality of the hearings, in favour of increased privacy for the juvenile. The state's increased paternalistic role led to the pursuit of a welfare penological philosophy model. The state was now asserting its right, as parens patriae, to ensure the proper civilisation of its youth. This new system infringed on the once unfettered access parents had to raise their children. For example, now, parental abuse and maltreatment of children could result in the temporary elimination of their rights. Actions taken by the criminal justice system were charged to be “in the best interest of the child.”

In 1967, the United States Supreme Court case In re Gault triggered a shift in juvenile criminal justice ideology. The American decision played a large role in intellectually influencing Dutch penology. Gault fundamentally changed the penological landscape because the decision mandated an extension of due process rights to juveniles. This shift in ideology saw juveniles as a source of rights; and from that point on, the once virulent dividing line between juvenile and adult penology faded. The intellectual groundwork underlying Gault helped catalyze an insurgence of retributive principles, which influenced the penological debate in the Netherlands. Principles of proportionality permeated into the system as policies which previously advocated the rehabilitation of juvenile delinquents grew to disfavour. These principles theorised that because juveniles possess free will, they should therefore be responsible for the choices that they make in life. Accordingly, concerns over the reintegration of offenders into society should be subordinate to ensuring that offenders receive their "just deserts". These retributive principles marked a sharp divergence from the rehabilitative and therapeutic philosophies that preceded them. This sharp ideological divergence transformed Dutch prosecutorial charging guidelines. Prior to Gault, prosecutors typically dropped charges in cases of petty offences. In fact, historically, three-quarters of all recorded offences in the Netherlands were eventually dismissed. After the United States Supreme Court's 1967 decision however, the Dutch reversed course; prosecutors dramatically decreased the number of routine dismissals.

=== Sanctions in adult penology ===
==== Fines and transactions ====
The most often used Dutch sanction is the fine. The fine's popularity stems from the 1983 Financial Penalties Act (FPA), which stresses the use of the fine over that of incarceration. Dutch courts imposed the fine in 51,280 cases, representing approximately one-third of all sanctions. Section 24 of the FPA stresses that a court should consider an offender's ability to pay and the nature of the crime when deciding on an appropriate amount of the fine. Despite the fine's popularity in the Dutch system, a substantial number of fines go unpaid every year. Similarly, transactions play a large role in the sentencing protocol of the Netherlands. A transaction is a sanction whereby the offender is required to pay a fine or assume certain financial conditions. Transactions are popular in the Netherlands because they provide an alternative sanction to punish offenders without congesting the jails. Specifically, transactions permit an offender to pay a fine to avoid further prosecution. Prosecutors have tremendous discretion to dispose of crimes through the use of transactions. However, transactions can only be offered in cases where the maximum statutory prison sentence is less than six years. Approximately 90% of crimes can be appropriately disposed of via a transaction. Yet, in practice, roughly 30% of all cases are settled through the use of a transaction, with prosecutorial guidelines established to minimise arbitrariness. Transactions provide an opportunity for offenders to forgo the stigmatisation that results from the more traditional disposition of cases. Critics however allege that transactions coerce the arrested to forgo the procedural safeguards required by trials. As a result, they contend arrested individuals may plead to crimes they did not commit because the risk of conviction outweighs the transaction fee.

==== Semi-indeterminate detention ====
A semi-indeterminate detention of offender (TBR order) is a sanction ordering the placement of an offender in a secure clinic for an indeterminate period of time. The frequent use of these TBR orders exemplified the rehabilitative culture of the Netherlands following World War II. In 1955 alone, one-third of all incarcerated prisoners were in mental institutions. Critics lamented their overuse, and argued the Dutch rehabilitative philosophy permitted any offence to be sanctioned by a TBR order. A shift in penological philosophy over the next two decades dramatically decreased the use of TBR orders; by 1970, only one-tenth of all incarcerated prisoners occupied mental institutions.

==== Incarceration ====
The Custodial Institutions Agency is responsible for the incarceration of adults in the Netherlands.

The Netherlands has a much lower prison population rate than The United States. America's prison occupancy level is at an extreme 103.9%, while the Netherlands prison occupancy is a mere 68.1%. The Netherlands has a relatively low prison population rate compared to that of the U.S., at 59 per 100,000 of the nation's population. To put this number into perspective, the U.S.’s prison population rate is 666 per 100,000. To be specific, the official prison capacity of the Netherlands is at 15,074, which is far less than America’s prison population of 2,145,100.

Breaking these numbers down into smaller categories, the World Prison Brief website shows that pre-trial detainees make up 20.3% of the prison population in the Netherlands. According to World Prison Brief, female prisoners make up 5.4% of the prison population. In the U.S., this number is much higher at 9.7%. Juveniles make up only 0.2% of the prison population in the Netherlands. The prison administration of the Netherlands is called the National Agency of Correctional Institutions, or NACI. The Netherlands’ prison population has been steadily declining since 2006. They have so much extra room that they take in prisoners from other countries. In fact, 19.1% of their prisoners are foreigners. In the U.S., this number is only 5.2%. Not only can prisons in the Netherlands house all of their prisoners comfortably, but they can also help out with overcrowding in other countries.

The Netherlands experienced an extended period of decarceration from 1947 until 1974.

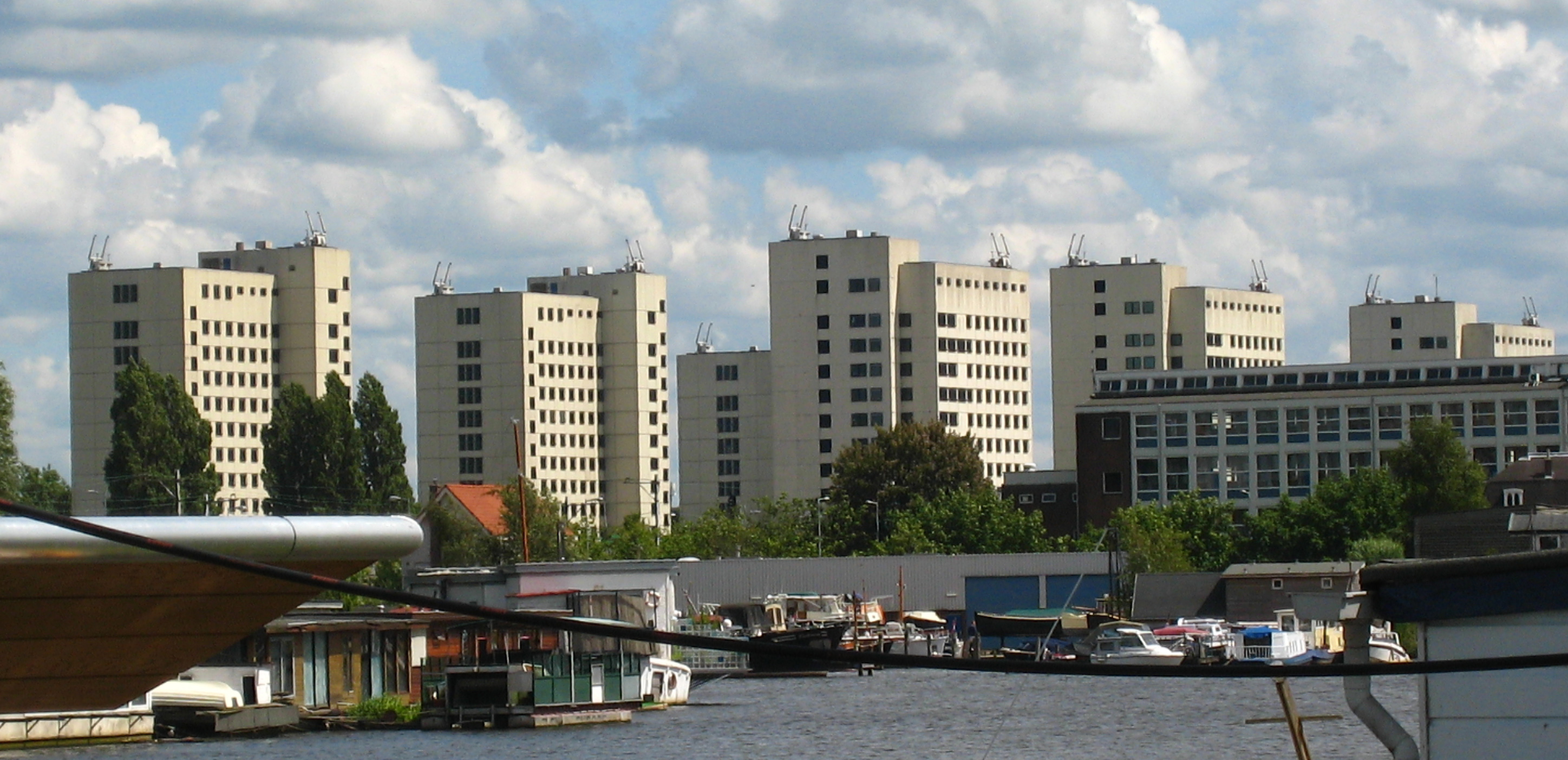
The six towers of the Bijlmerbajes prison complex, seen over the Amstel river in Amsterdam

Beginning in 1975 however, this trend changed. Between 1975 and 2005, the incarceration rate in the Netherlands has consistently increased. In 2005, the number of people that were in Dutch prisons on the basis of a criminal law decision was 15,206. Since 2005, the number of people that are in Dutch prisons on the basis of a criminal law decision has been decreasing to 8,806 in 2016. Incarceration rates alone, particularly in the Netherlands, are a poor indicator of a country's purported move towards more punitive sentencing. Measuring changes in prison capacity alone is an insufficient measure of punitiveness in the Netherlands because these numbers do not accurately represent the incarceration needs of the Dutch. Notably, in the 1970s Dutch prisons operated at full capacity. Incarceration rates were kept artificially low in this era because the Dutch declined to construct the required number of prisons to suit the demands imposed by their criminal justice system. This problem was alleviated on the front-end by dismissing three-quarters of all recorded offences. Furthermore, there was no guarantee the convicted would ever spend any time in prison, even when prosecutors did not dismiss the offence and the offender was subsequently convicted and sentenced to prison. Individuals were still sent to prison even in the absence of capacity. To remedy this shortfall in capacity, the Netherlands established waitlists for prisons. If the prison incarcerated more perilous offenders than the convicted, then the convict was placed on a waitlist until their crime was deemed sufficiently severe. The reason behind these waitlists was purely practical: the Dutch simply did not have enough available space in their prisons. These waitlists were not developed for rehabilitative reasons. In fact, prison sentences were voided if the convicted spent too long on the waitlist. Over 5,000 unsuspended prison sentences were voided in 1995 alone due to a lack of space in prisons.

Fundamental changes in penal philosophy resulted from the national concern that was registered over these ever-escalating prison waitlists. The Dutch Ministry of Justice report, Law in Motion, in fact advocated, “[w]hat is at stake is nothing less than the credibility of constitutional government and its democratic and social values…Our highest policy priority is, of necessity, to combat crime by preventive and repressive means…[.]” In response to the concerns of the populace, a substantial increase in the construction of prisons was undertaken in the 1980s and again in the 1990s. Increased incarceration capacity was a direct result of criticism emanating from burgeoning prison waitlists. The far severer sentencing of offenders also increased the need for additional prison capacity. Approximately 13,000 unsuspended prison sentences were imposed totaling 2,100 detention years in 1970. Yet, in 2000, while the number of unsuspended prison sentences doubled, the number of detention years imposed increased nearly eightfold to 16,000. Following the prison construction boom of the 1980s, prison capacity increased from 3,300 occupants to approximately 12,800. In the 1990s, capacity was further increased by an additional 3,500 individuals, bringing the total prison capacity to approximately 16,300 persons. This trend is likely to continue into the future. At least one commentator has noted that the enactment of a “three strikes law” has the potential to raise the Dutch incarceration rate to that of American levels. For 2002, the incarceration rate was 93 inmates per 100,000 citizens. Prosecutors’ prior widespread discretion over cases has declined since the enactment of new penological guidelines. Guidelines previously imposed a presumption in favour of dismissal, whereas now the guidelines impose a presumption to not dismiss cases.

The relatively open borders and easy international mobility of the Netherlands makes it an attractive destination for immigrants. As a result, the Dutch have also encountered a substantial increase in the infiltration of illegal immigration. In fact, after the prison construction boom in the 1990s, the number of illegal immigrants detained for removal increased from 2,000 to 9,600 in only eight years—a 380 percent increase. As a result, 10 percent of all prison capacity is required for the detention of illegal immigrants.

One of the most expressive features of the Dutch criminal justice system eliminated in this new movement towards retributivism was the one-cell policy. Dutch penal policy historically permitted only one prisoner per cell out of a concern for basic dignity. However, as the Dutch crime rate sextupled in the last decade, concerns for human dignity became subservient to crime control policies. As a result, Dutch penal policy was amended to permit more than one prisoner in a cell in 2003. This change notwithstanding, the Dutch incarceration philosophy stresses the need to minimise the hardships on the prisoner. This philosophy emphasises maximising prisoner contacts with family and the preservation of community ties. Prisoners are able to enjoy many of the benefits of life on the outside. For example, inmates can receive visitors once a week, talk on the phone, and participate in sports. Rehabilitative measures, however, such as the procurement of education to prisoners, have been severely curtailed in recent years.

=== Sanctions in juvenile penology ===
Currently, the police exercise largely discretionary powers over juvenile matters. Police have three options available when confronted with a juvenile matter: take no further action, dismiss the case after speaking with the child's guardians, or direct the matter to the prosecutor. Juvenile offenders are primarily subject to two main sanctions: the fine and detention. Those placed in detention may be held in small-scale juvenile facilities (Kleinschalige Voorziening Justitiële Jeugd - KVJJ) or juvenile justice facilities (Rijks Justitiële Jeugdinrichting – JJI). Furthermore, three alternative sanctions exist: community service, reparations for damages, and the training order. Fines are an available alternative, but judges do not typically impose fines on juveniles; they are not considered an appropriate sanction because juveniles rarely end up paying the fines themselves. Only three percent of juvenile incarceration is unconditional. Juvenile detentions are typically conditional and coincide with community service orders. The community service order was implemented for juveniles after its successful introduction into adult penology. In 1998, seventy percent of all juvenile cases disposed of in court resulted in an alternative sentence (community service, training order, or reparations). Juveniles between the ages of 12 and 16 can be sentenced up to twelve months, whereas individuals between 16 and 18 years old can be sentenced up to 24 months.

A number of sanctions have been introduced for children under the age of 12. The Dutch system does not regard these children as criminally responsible for their actions, and rehabilitative programs have been developed to tend to their delinquency. Two notable programs, HALT and STOP, were developed to respond to juvenile delinquency. STOP was developed to confront the onset of delinquency in juveniles under the age of 12, whereas HALT is for older children. These programs combine strains of rehabilitative and restorative justice to confront the onset of delinquency. Under the programs, police officers who encounter minor juvenile indiscretions can contact the offender's parents, or may propose action to be undertaken by social workers. Sanctions include restorative measures such as apologising, or rehabilitative measures like viewing a film or drawing a picture. Besides programs like HALT and STOP, a number of additional rehabilitative trends have emerged. First, the Netherlands has reintroduced youth police, to specifically deal with juveniles. Additionally, many police departments employ a social worker to counsel on juvenile matters. Second, the Netherlands has seen an upsurge in financial investments in institutional treatment directed towards youth. Treatment is not exclusively focused on in-case intervention; follow-up procedures play a significant role in providing continuous observational treatment.

==== Delinquency rates ====
Over the last twenty years, juvenile delinquency rates have been remarkably stable. A similar trend however is not apparent in the level of juvenile violence over the past twenty years. In the mid 1990s, violence-related offences surged sixty percent. Most citizens, including those most intimately involved in the criminal justice system—specifically, police officers, prosecutors, and judges—believe that violent crime has increased in the Netherlands. As Michael Tonry explained, "[w]e know that ordinary citizens base their opinions on what they know about crime from the mass media and as a result that they regard heinous crimes and bizarre sanctions as the norms. They believe sentences are much softer than they are, and they believe crime rates are rising when they are falling. As a result majorities nearly always report that judges' sentences are too lenient." For example, neither victimisation surveys nor hospital records show an increase in violent crime over the last decade. This increase may be because police have become less tolerant of violent acts, and the public has become more vigilant in reporting these offences. Therefore, like the adult system, it is impossible to know whether the increase in the juvenile violent crime rate is largely the result of changes in police and citizen behaviour, or an increase in the frequency of violent crime.

As of 2004, data indicates that property crime offences have stabilised over the last two decades.
