= Killing of Michael Koomen =

2011 shooting by Dutch police

Michael Koomen
- Born: Michael Arjan Koomen; 20 July 1979; Amsterdam, Netherlands
- Died: 14 May 2011 (aged 31); Amsterdam, Netherlands
- Cause of death: Shot by a police officer
- Education: University of Amsterdam
- Occupation: Jurist
- Employer: SNS Reaal

Michael Arjan Koomen (20 July 1979 – 14 May 2011) was a Dutch amateur footballer who was shot and killed by a police officer while trying to calm down a struggle between his team mates and the officer in Amsterdam. The Dutch public prosecutor announced the officer would not be charged over the shooting, a decision upheld on appeal. Subsequently, in 2014 the Koomen family filed an application with the European Court of Human Rights (ECHR). In 2025, the court ruled that no violation of the European Convention on Human Rights had taken place.

== Biography ==
Koomen was born on 20 July 1979 in Buitenveldert, Amsterdam, as an eldest son. He studied notary law, graduating from the University of Amsterdam in 1997, and worked as a jurist at SNS Reaal. At the time of his death, he was single and had two cats. Koomen captained the amateur football team RKAVIC, located in neighbouring Amstelveen.

== Incident ==
On 14 May 2011 in North Holland, Dutch team RKAVIC 4 was celebrating that it had won their league championship. 20 team members boarded a boat at Ouderkerk aan de Amstel and began to drink heavily. The captain of the boat decided to cut the trip short and went to the endpoint at Museumplein in Amsterdam.

The men then walked through the inner city, and at the corner of Weteringschans and Spiegelgracht, around 22:00, they met a passing police officer who attempted to arrest two men from the group for public intoxication (one of them being Nick Koomen, Michael's brother). The officer handcuffed them together and put them in his van. The police officer then pushed another man, Diego Medina, to the ground and Medina retaliated. Five more men joined the attack and in the ensuing struggle, the police officer took out his gun. He fired off four shots in quick succession, fatally hitting Michael Koomen in the heart with the first bullet, which was later claimed to have been a warning shot. Another man was hit in the leg and Nick Koomen was wounded lightly by two bullets. Passing witnesses thought that the officer was panicked and fighting for his life, whilst an aide worker alleged that the footballers had used beer and cocaine.

== Later events ==
In September 2011, AFC Ajax fans broke into applause at the 31st minute of a match against FC Twente to commemorate the life of Koomen, who had been a season ticket holder. At trial in the Amsterdam District Court in October 2011, Nick Koomen and Diego Medina were accused of violence against a police officer; it was stated that Michael Koomen had not used violence.

Amsterdam FM reported that the officer who shot Koomen had a bad reputation in the force and had been convicted in 1999 of assaulting a handcuffed arrestee. On the evening of 30 January 2012, part of Stadhouderskade and Weteringschans were closed off to enable a reconstruction of events by twenty researchers.

The public prosecutor announced that the officer would not be charged, having been justified in using lethal force. This decision was unsuccessfully appealed to the appeals court. This court emphasised how regrettable it was that a man who had been attempting to calm everyone down had been killed. The judges commented "At no time did he behave violently toward the police officer".

After the court of appeal upheld the decision not to prosecute the officer, lawyers for Koomen's family said in 2014 that they would be taking the case to the European Court of Human Rights (ECHR) based on the grounds that a police officer can only fire a weapon as a last resort. They also saw a conflict of interest because the public prosecutor had formerly worked with the accused officer. In 2025 the ECHR ruled that no violation of the European Convention on Human Rights had taken place.

== See also ==
- Killing of Mitch Henriquez
- Killing of Rishi Chandrikasing
- Killing of Sammy Baker
