= Death of Klaus-Jürgen Rattay =

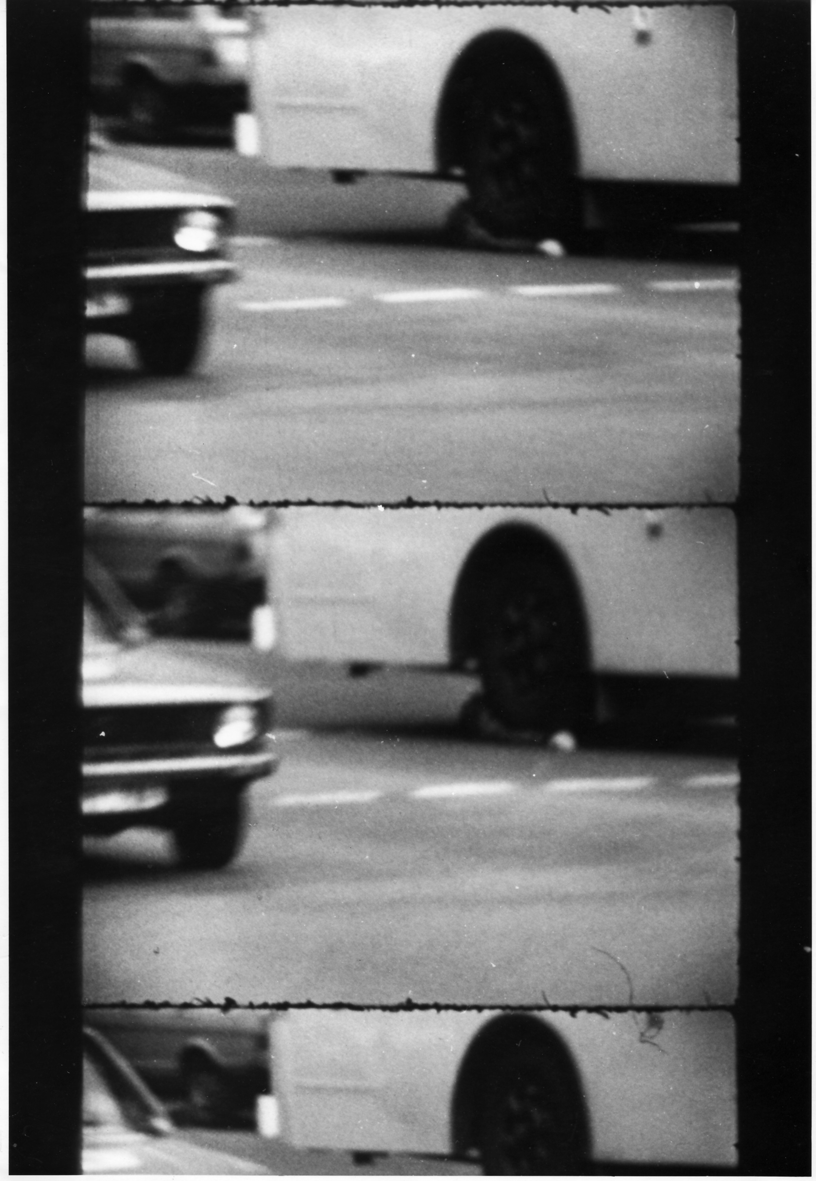
A still from film footage shows Rattay's body under the bus

Klaus-Jürgen Rattay (c. 1963–1981) was an 18-year-old punk from Kleve, Germany, who was run over and killed by a bus in Berlin. He was participating in a 1981 demonstration against the eviction of eight buildings in Schöneberg on the order of senator Heinrich Lummer. His death caused debate in the Berlin Senate and a change in policy towards squatters; his life is commemorated by autonomous groups.

== Death ==
In 1981, the West Berlin squatters movement was at the height of its influence, with 165 squatted buildings in the city. Senator Heinrich Lummer of the CDU wanted to take a hardline approach and on 22 September 1981, squatters were evicted from eight buildings in Schöneberg on his order. Lummer invited journalists to a press conference in one of the empty buildings, Bülowstraße 89, which led to protestors gathering in the street outside. The police charged demonstrators on Potsdamer Straße near to Potsdamer Platz and pushed them into the road. In consequence Klaus-Jürgen Rattay, an 18-year-old punk from Kleve, was run over by a BVG bus. He was dragged for 30 metres and died of his injuries immediately at the scene.

== Legacy ==
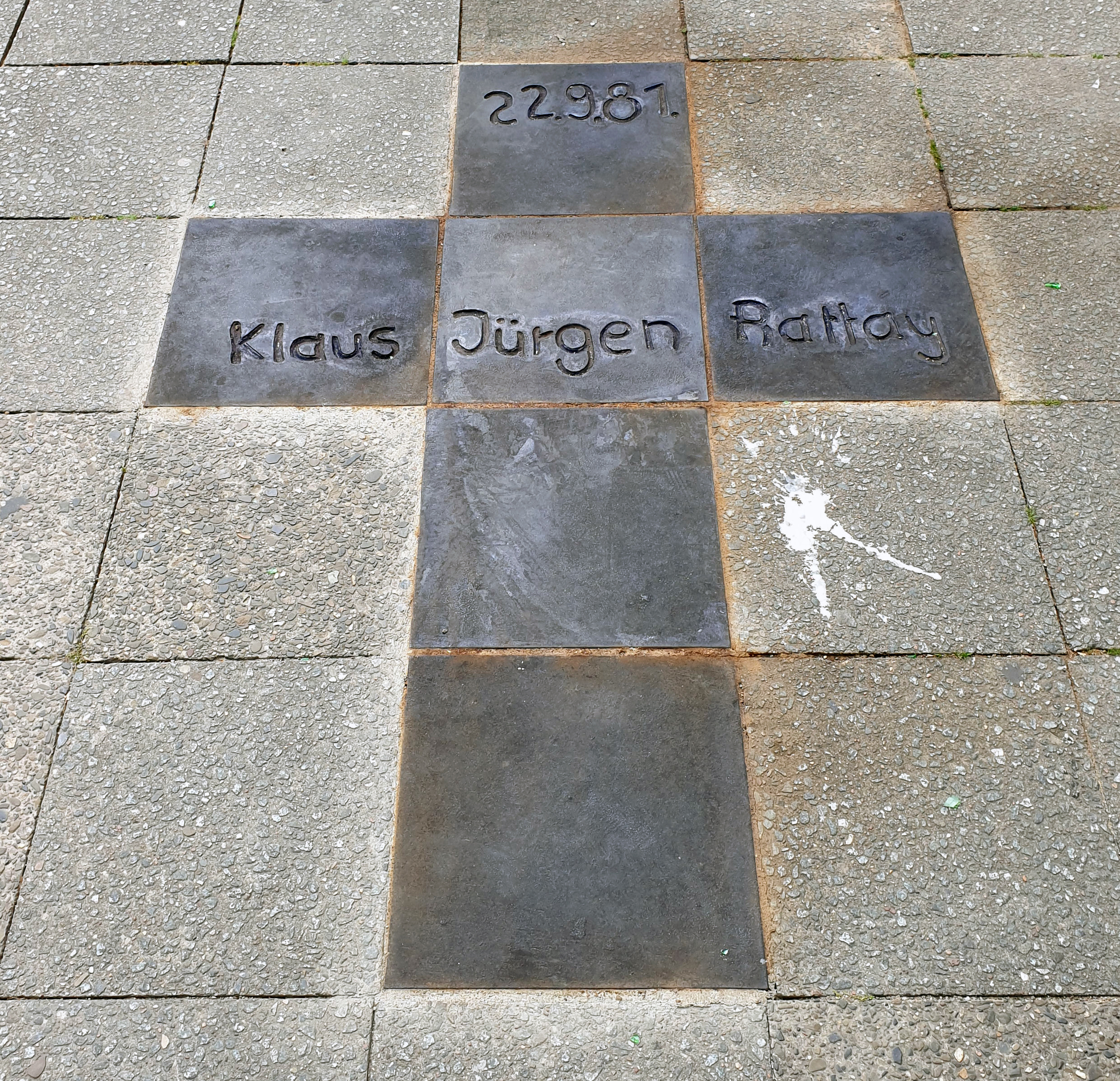
A memorial plaque to Rattay photographed in 2021

Rattay's death had a political impact in the city of Berlin. Supporters of the squatters movement urged the Senate to legalise squats instead of evicting them and pressed for an eviction moratorium which lasted until Easter 1982. Governing Mayor of Berlin Richard von Weizsäcker (CDU) took a more conciliatory approach than Lummer and by 1984, 105 of the 165 squatted buildings had been legalized, with the rest evicted.

Various autonomous groups have commemorated Rattay by using his name when taking direct action. In 2016, the Klaus Jürgen Rattay Commandos attacked 28 cars around Potsdamer Platz and 20 cars the next night in Neukölln.

== See also ==
- Death of Hans Kok
