= Bijlmerbajes =

Prison complex in Amsterdam, the Netherlands

Coordinates: 52.3385°N 4.9242°E

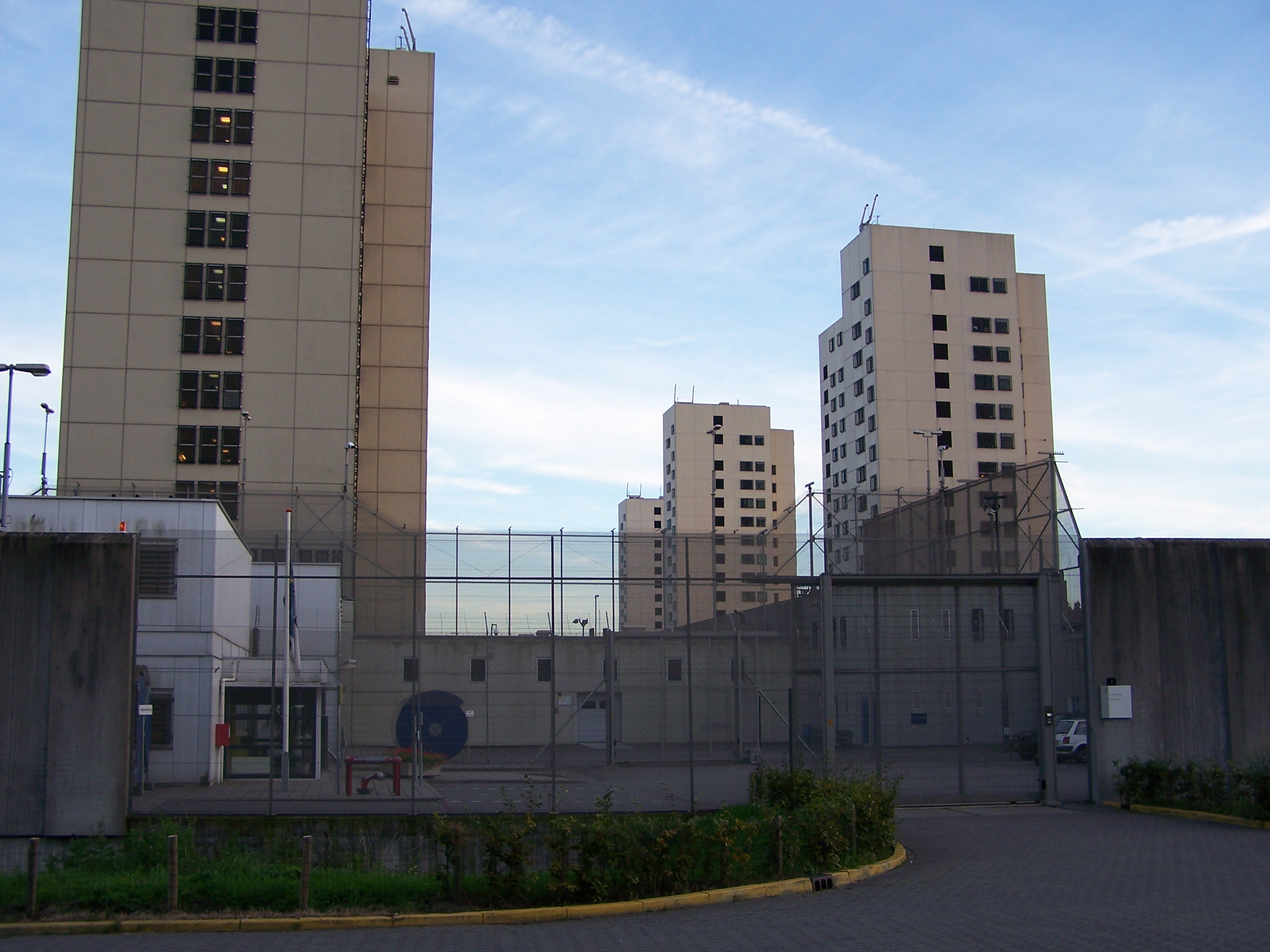
The Bijlmerbajes

The Bijlmerbajes was a prison complex (which was permanently closed in June 2016) in Amsterdam, the Netherlands, near the Amsterdam Amstel railway station. The official name is Penitentiaire Inrichting Over-Amstel, although it is also known as Penitentiaire Inrichting De Stadspoort or Penitentiaire Inrichtingen Amsterdam. Bijlmerbajes is part of the Custodial Institutions Agency (Dienst Justitiële Inrichtingen, DJI) of the Dutch Ministry of Justice within the Dutch criminal justice system.

The building was designed as a humane prison without bars over the windows and was opened in 1978. However it turned out that the glass of the windows was not completely unbreakable, so bars were retroactively fitted, known as lamellen. The complex consists of 6 towers with small divisions. The towers are connected by a tunnel through the prison, known as the 'Kalverstraat'. The main entrance to the prison is 150 metres (490 ft) from the Spaklerweg metro station.

The alliterative name Bijlmerbajes was presumably acquired because the tower complex was constructed at the same time as highrise construction in the neighbouring Bijlmermeer, with bajes a Dutch slang term for "prison".

In 2017, five teams were selected for the redevelopment of the former penitentiary complex and in 2022 the finished project of Bajeskwartier was presented to the customers seeking accommodation and recreational services

== Towers ==
The six towers each operate as a separate prison, each with a different type of prisoners and/or function. The towers are connected via the 260 meter long central corridor Kalverstraat. Besides the six towers there are also six outside areas (one for each tower), three gymnasiums or sport-centres, a small religious building functioning as church and mosque. A central front building houses some central functions such as the kitchen, visitor reception rooms, the entry processing department and the offices.

Each tower has 14 floors. Each department or pavilion has two floors connected via open stairs. Vertical transport between the pavilions and the four shared floors is possible via lifts. Two large lifts are used by the prisoners and a special small lift is only available for staff. In normal circumstances staff and inmates never share a lift. Emergency stairs are provided on two locations: one set next to the lifts and another shaft is built on the other end of each tower. Many activities take place on the remaining four floors, away from the pavilions. Examples are: working in the workshops on the ground-floor, library, training or education, yard-time, doctors office etc. The total floorspace of the complex is 84.860 m2 The six towers are:

Note: HvB stands for Huis van bewaring which is the term for a prison for people awaiting sentencing or people convicted to a jailtime up to 6 months. Criminals convicted to a longer sentence than 6 months are moved to a prison, but often this last term is used for an HVB as well.

=== Het Schouw ===
A standard HvB with five pavilions. Three of them offer cells with more than one prisoner (meermans cel), one standard pavilion with only single person cells and one special care unit for prisoners needing more or special attention.
The special care unit has extra facilities and trained staff to house persons that need extra care, such as prisoners with psychological problems or drug-addicts.

Het Schouw offers a standard day program between 09:00 and 16:00. In the afternoon activities like sport, recreation, library, receiving visitors and yard-time. Optional prisoners can earn some money (approximately 20 euros per week) by performing simple work in the workshop. In HvB's, work is optional, but people not working remain locked up in their cell during working hours.

The HvB is named after a bend in the River Amstel which is nearby the complex.

=== De Weg ===
De Weg (Dutch for The Road) is also a HvB for 135 prisoners. De Weg is primarily used for repeating offenders (veelplegers). The five pavilions each with 24 cells. Three of these 24 can hold multiple prisoners (normally two prisoners), the other 21 are small cells for one prisoner. For communal use each pavilion has a shared area for recreation, a kitchen and communal showers.

The day program is roughly the same as in Het Schouw

=== Demersluis ===
Demersluis is also a HvB. It can hold 125 prisoners. The five pavilions are divided into:

- one providing multi-person (2) cells
- two reserved for so called arrestanten. Arrestanten are people who have failed to pay their fines or who did not show up when sentenced to do community work.
- two (half) pavilions offer a specialized program for addicts who want to use their time behind bars to fight their addiction problems.
- the last pavilion houses a National department for dangerous prisoners. Prisoners who are deemed too dangerous to stay in a normal HvB can be detained in this section.

The program offered in the normal departments is comparable with Het Schouw. The prisoners following the program to fight their addiction follow a special program.

The HvB is named after a former sluice or locks between the River Amstel and the former Zuiderzee (now IJsselmeer). This name was chosen because this tower was original used as the central entrance-tower. All incoming prisoners were housed here before being placed in one of the remaining towers. Demersluis could thus be seen as a sluice between the outside world and the (rest of the) prison.

=== De Schans ===
Centre for stelselmatige daders – ISD. Criminals convicted of several—relatively light—crimes within a five-year period can be sent to an ISD. These offenders commit many relatively small crimes and earlier prison sentences didn't stop them re-offending. Many of these prisoners are drug addicts who commit their crimes to finance their habit.

People convicted to the ISD program can be locked up for a period of two years, even when the normal sentence for that crime is much shorter. The relative new ISD punishment was set up to protect the society for a longer period from these criminals and offer special treatment to these criminals.

De Schans can house 120 ISD prisoners.

=== FOBA Het Veer ===
Het Veer is a special department for prisoners with severe psychological problems. Prisoners unfit to live in a normal prison can be sent to Het Veer. Het Veer is a national crisis facility to accommodate people with severe psychological problems. Het Veer can accommodate 66 prisoners; 60 male and 6 female. Some 300 prisoners are sent to Het Veer each year.

Het Veer is the only facility where patients can receive forced depot medication as it is the only place with 24/7 medical staff.

On arrival in Het Veer (in most cases transferred from another prison that couldn't handle the prisoner) the patient will be observed for some time. During this period the staff will decide about an individual treatment program and all effort is given to calm down the patient.

When the patient is stabilized he will be treated for his problems until he is ready to return to a normal facility or to go to a special centre (outside or within the justice system).

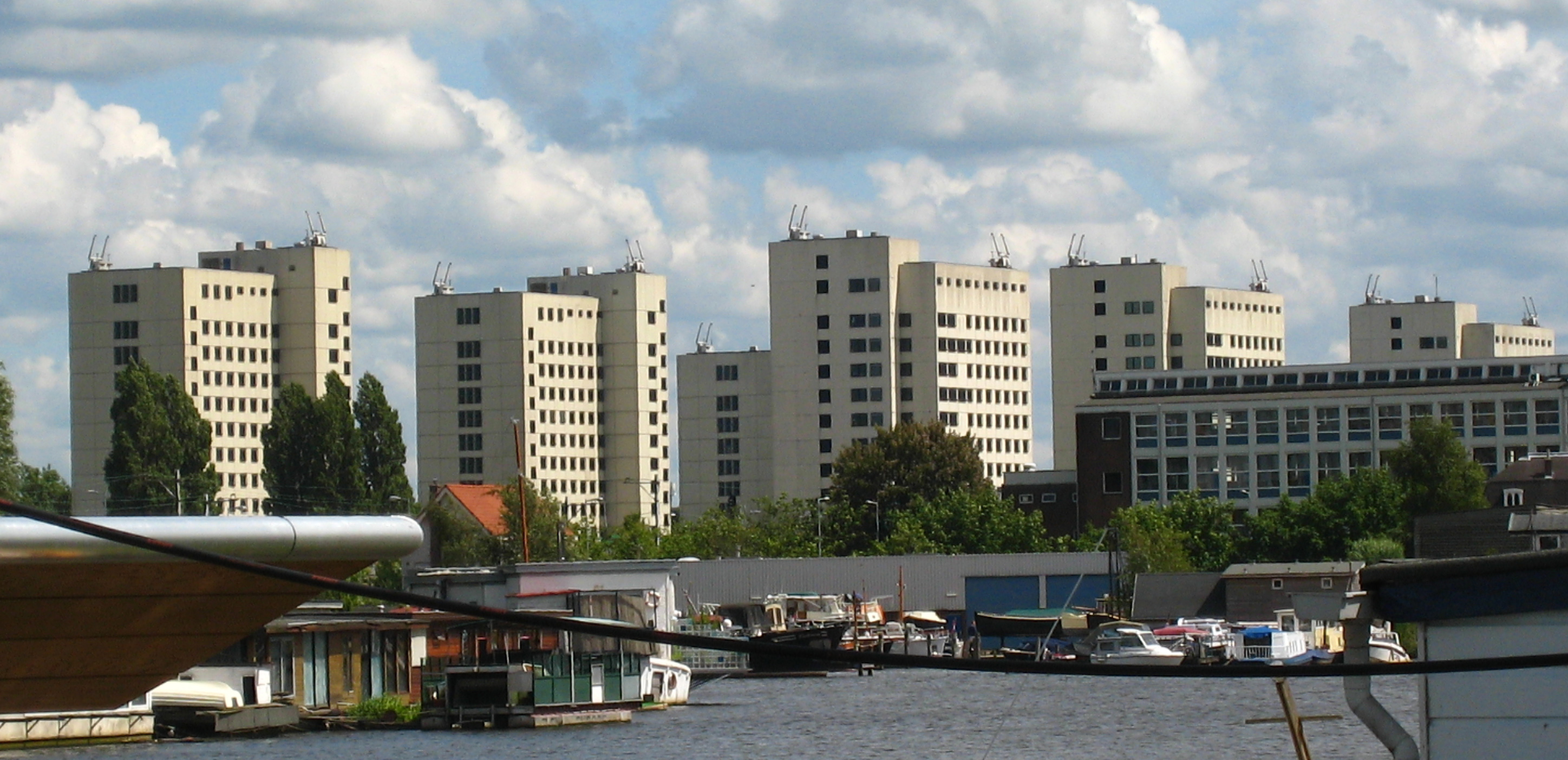
The six towers of the Bijlmerbajes, seen over the river Amstel
