= Killing of Rishi Chandrikasing =

Shot dead by Dutch police in 2012

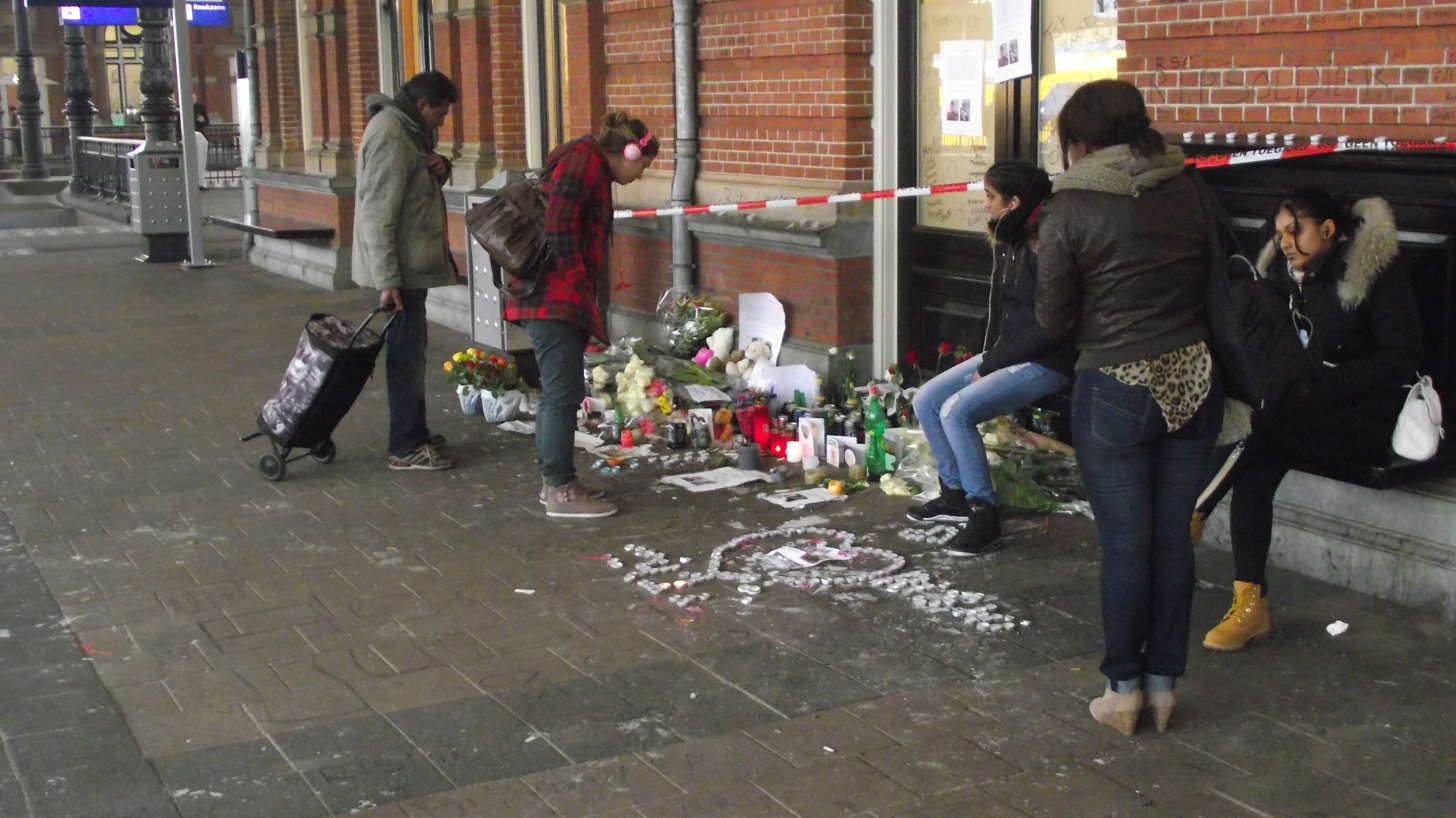
Memorial to Chandrikasing at Hollands Spoor railway station

Rishi Chandrikasing (2 February 1995 – 24 November 2012) was shot dead by a Dutch police officer at Hollands Spoor railway station in the Hague on 24 November 2012. He was 17 years old and the killing became a controversial case in the Netherlands. At trial, the police officer who shot him was cleared of manslaughter. The officer was not fired, and filled in a different position at the police behind the scenes as protection from extreme scrutiny and threats from the public.

== Killing ==
Rishi Chandrikasing was a 17 year old Dutch national who lived in a shelter for disadvantaged youths in Scheveningen. On 23 November 2012, he went out to a club for his cousin's birthday and then in the morning headed to his mother's house, to bid farewell to his grandmother who was travelling to Suriname that day. At 6:00 am on 24 November 2012, three police officers went to Hollands Spoor railway station, having been informed there was someone who was making threats with a firearm. They encountered Chandrikasing on platform 4 and he did not stop moving away from them. Whilst pursuing him with gun drawn, one officer shot him in the neck, from behind. The police waited for one minute before attempting to resuscitate him and he was then rushed to Westeinde Hospital, where he died. He was not carrying a firearm and had only keys and a mobile phone in his pockets. The police took eight hours to contact Chandrikasing's family, even though his mother's telephone number was on his keychain.

== Reactions ==
Friends of Chandrikasing expressed disbelief that the police had not fired a warning shot or shot him in the leg. On 2 February 2013, they celebrated what would have been Chandrikasing's 18th birthday with a memorial service on platform 4. De Telegraaf announced that Chandrikasing had been living under a court-imposed curfew and should not have been outside at the time of his death; this was later proven to be untrue because he had appeared in court two days before his death and the curfew had been lifted. His friends and family members began to fight what they saw as a campaign of vilification in the media. A witness told her story that she had seen the police shout "Stop" and before Chandrikasing had a chance to turn around, he was shot. By December, the family of Chandrikasing had lost patience with the investigation and launched a civil case against the officer who had shot him. They also made formal complaints against the person who had told the police there was someone at the station acting in a threatening manner and against the municipality of the Hague because information about Chandrikasing's criminal record had been leaked. Before the trial, the police paid for the funeral of Chandrikasing, which was attended by a thousand people.

The National Criminal Investigation Department then announced it had completed its investigation and the public prosecutor decided to prosecute the officer who shot Chandrikasing for manslaughter. The report stated that when at the station, Chandrikasing had allegedly told an English man that he could not stand in the waiting area because it was only for Dutch people and subsequently told him he had a weapon. The Englishman told the station staff, who called the police. This story was immediately disputed by Chandrikasing's cousin who said that in fact a station employee had given a statement saying Chandrikasing's behaviour on the night in question had been exemplary. He also queried why the family had not been allowed to view footage from the station's many CCTV cameras. The report itself questioned why the officer had shot whilst moving, in direct contravention of guidelines, and asked why he had not aimed at the legs.

== Trial ==
At trial in December 2013, the Hague court announced that the anonymous police officer was cleared of the charges of manslaughter and murder. The verdict said the officer had been left with no other option but to shoot the young man and the officer had tried to aim for the leg. Chandrikasing's family said they were deeply disappointed by the ruling.

== Later events ==
Following the acquittal of the officer, a demonstration was held by 50 people which demanded the resignations of Mayor Jozias van Aartsen and local chief of police Paul van Musscher. Three people were arrested.

In 2017, the police officer who shot Chandrikasing was arrested on suspicion of corruption and breach of secrecy, for leaking information from police systems to third parties.

Dutch playwright Kees Roorda wrote a play based on first hand accounts of the shooting called Rishi. It premiered at Pakhuis De Règâh in the Hague in 2017. In 2021, a production of the play entitled A kid like Rishi was put on by the Origin Theatre Company in New York.

== See also ==
- Killing of Michael Koomen
- Killing of Mitch Henriquez
- Killing of Sammy Baker
