= Killing of Mitch Henriquez =

Death in Dutch police custody in 2015

Mitch Henriquez was killed by Dutch police at a music festival in The Hague on 27 June 2015. During an altercation, he was restrained by five police officers and was choked to death. The official narrative that Henriquez had died at the hospital was immediately disputed by bystanders who had filmed the incident; the killing led to four days of rioting in The Hague and a ban on public assembly. At trial two years later, two police officers were convicted and sentenced to six months in prison. On appeal, one sentence was quashed and the other was upheld. At the final court of appeal, the Supreme Court, the remaining sentence was upheld in 2021. The case has been compared to other police homicides such as the murder of George Floyd and the killing of Freddie Gray. RTL Nieuws revealed in 2021 that the Hague police force had spent €1.3 million on lawyers to defend the officers involved in the killing.

== Killing ==
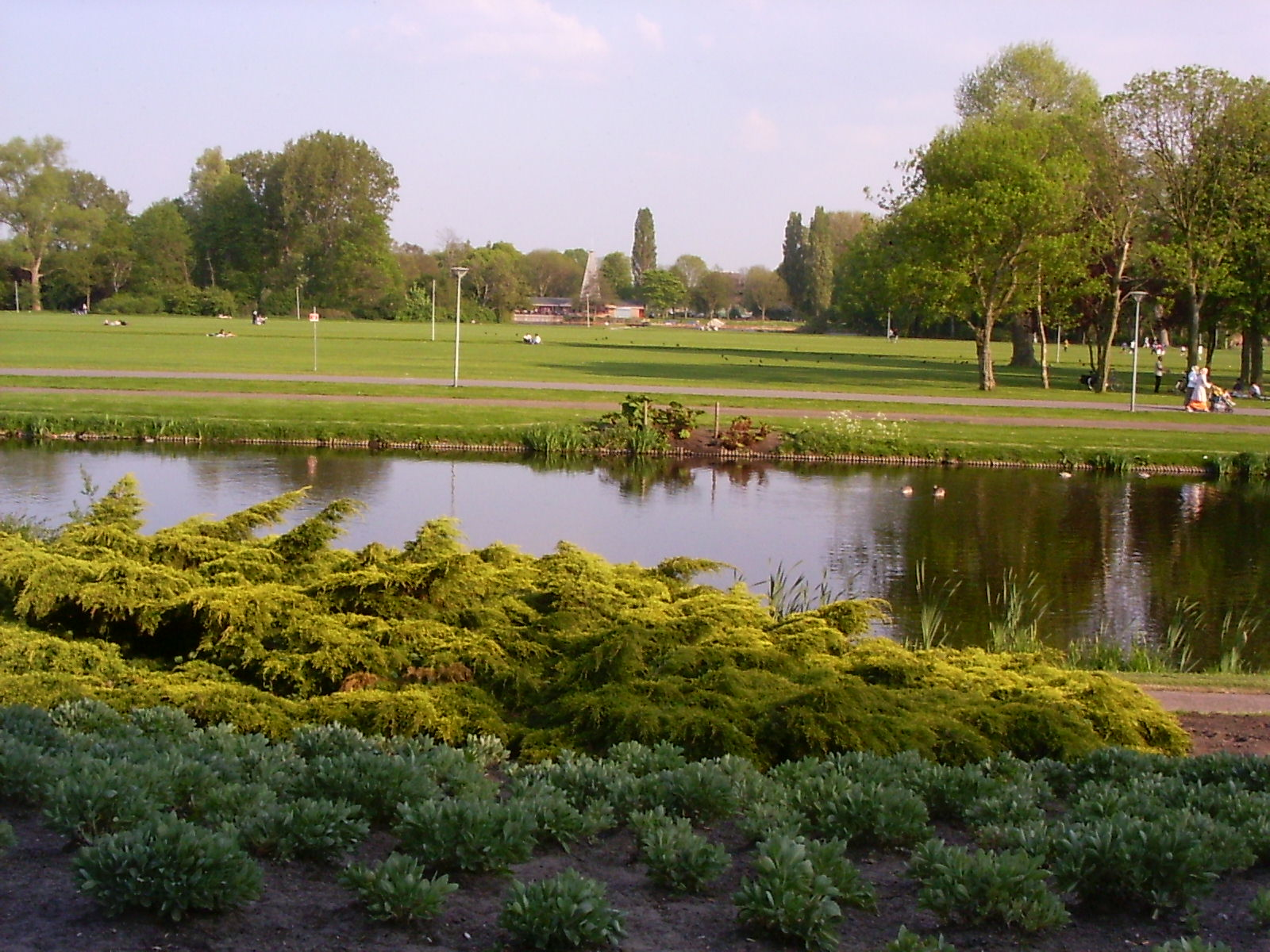
The Zuiderpark in The Hague

Aruban man Mitch Henriquez (aged 42) was on holiday in the Netherlands in the summer of 2015. On 27 June, he went to the Night at the Park music festival which was headlined by UB40 at the Zuiderpark in The Hague. He died after being arrested by five police officers, who choked him until he was dead. On the police account, Henriquez had told the officers he had a weapon, then pointed at his crotch; officers went to arrest him on suspicion of being armed, he resisted arrest and became unwell as he was being transported to the police station. This narrative was immediately contested by footage filmed by concerned bystanders which showed the police picking up Henriquez's unresponsive body and placing it in a van.

== Immediate aftermath ==
Henriquez was killed on Sunday and footage of his death immediately began to circulate on social media, with #mitchhenriquez becoming the top Dutch language hashtag on Twitter. On Monday night, people gathered outside a police station in the inner-city district of Schilderswijk to protest, resulting in 61 arrests after three days of riots. On the fourth night, the police announced a ban on the public assembly of more than three people, with use of weapons and scooters prohibited. Officers then arrested 200 people that evening when further riots broke out, for breaching the order.

Chief Public Prosecutor Kitty Nooy claimed that Henriquez had died in hospital. She said according to the autopsy Henriquez had died of asphyxiation, as result of being choked; there were no natural causes of death and Henriquez's body did not contain alcohol or drugs. Five police officers were then suspended and put under investigation. Paul van Musscher, Chief of the Hague police force, said "it really went wrong". On the Caribbean island of Aruba (a constituent country within the Kingdom of the Netherlands) the killing received much coverage in the media. Ronald Plasterk, the Minister of the Interior and Kingdom Relations spoke to Mike Eman, the Prime Minister of Aruba, to assure him that a full investigation would be carried out. One week later on Saturday 7 July, Henriquez's family led a silent procession of 300 people from Moerwijk station in The Hague to the Zuiderpark.

== Trial ==
The Public Prosecution Service (Dutch: Openbaar Ministerie, OM) decided in 2016 to charge two of the five police officers who had been suspended. It considered that the arrest was justified but the means of restraint was not. One of the two officers had used a chokehold on Henriquez's neck, the other had punched him in the face and sprayed pepper spray. Of the other three officers, two were given written warnings.

Henriquez's family responded that all five police officers should stand trial since they had not called an ambulance, despite the obvious need to do so. The family had also requested twice without success for the names of the officers to be released. The District Court of the Hague postponed the trial because a new expert report had given a different cause of death for Henriquez, namely cardiac arrest or heart arrhythmia. It was also noted that the conduct of the former chief of police Gerard Bouman would be analysed since he had promised the five officers that they would not be sacked and that they would be financially compensated for their suspension.

The case came to trial in November 2017. Both officers said they felt threatened when Henriquez told them he had a gun and assumed he was serious when he stopped smiling. The prosecution disputed this account, saying that the officers did not search for a firearm at any stage. Since there were two differing explanations for Henriquez's death, a third specialist report had been commissioned and this expert told the court that Henriquez had died from acute stress as a result of police violence. A lip-reader affirmed that the police officers had known Henriquez was dead when they put him in the van, saying things such as "It's finished", "He doesn't respond" and "According to me, dead". On day 4 of proceeding, the family of Henriquez and their supporters left the court en masse in protest at the lack of interest in new images they had presented showing that Henriquez was already turning blue before being lifted into the van.

The two anonymous officers on trial were sentenced to a prison sentence of six months (suspended) and told that the use of a chokehold, punching in the face and spraying pepper spray in the face were all illegal acts. The court believed they had caused the death of Henriquez but did not consider it murder. Paul van Musscher expressed sympathy both for the family of Henriquez and for the officers involved, saying "No one wanted this to happen".

The officers appealed their convictions and at an introductory hearing in 2018, their right to remain anonymous was upheld. The officers had given evidence in secret in court, using voice distorters, since they feared for the safety of their families. In 2019, the court of appeal decided that one officer's conviction could be quashed and the other conviction for the chokehold was fitting. Henriquez's mother disputed the verdict, saying "Officers can now continue to kill people". The sole remaining convicted police officer then took their case to the final court of appeal, the Supreme Court. In 2021, the court ruled that the chokehold was illegal and the sentence was just.

== Legacy ==
The killing of Mitch Henriquez received sustained media attention in the Netherlands and was mentioned at Black Lives Matter protests, with comparisons being made to the murder of George Floyd and the killing of Freddie Gray. Academic work has noted that it was only because the death of Henriquez was filmed that the false official narrative could be challenged and eventually overturned.

A controversy developed in 2021, when it was revealed by RTL Nieuws that the Hague police force had spent €1.3 million on lawyers to defend the police officers involved in the killing of Mitch Henriquez. Richard Korver who represented Henriquez's mother in the case disclosed that he had been paid a total of €50,000. He commented "1.3 million is an outrageous amount of money. And the government is financing this". The chairman of the Dutch Association of Criminal Lawyers said it was clear that the police officers were being given the best legal assistance money could buy and that this created an imbalance in the proceedings.

== See also ==
- Killing of Michael Koomen
- Killing of Rishi Chandrikasing
- Killing of Sammy Baker
