= Public Prosecution Service (Netherlands) =

Netherlands Public Prosecution Service
- Openbaar Ministerie

Agency overview
- Formed: 1811
- Type: Prosecution Service
- Jurisdiction: Government of the Netherlands
- Headquarters: Prins Clauslaan 60 2595 AJ The Hague, Netherlands (Hague office)
- Minister responsible: David van Weel, Minister of Justice and Security
- Agency executive: Rinus Otte, Chairman of the board of Prosecutors General
- Website: om.nl (Dutch); prosecutionservice.nl (English)

The Public Prosecution Service (Dutch: Openbaar Ministerie, OM; lit. 'Public Ministry') is the body of public prosecutors in the Dutch criminal justice system.

The literal translation of Openbaar Ministerie, "Public Ministry", can lead to a misunderstanding, as the OM is not a ministry like the Ministry of Finance. The name doesn’t refer to a ministry of the government but of 'publicity'.

The Public Prosecution Service decides who has to appear in front of the judge and for which offence or crime. It is the body that can decide to prosecute someone. The main domain of the OM is criminal law rather than civil law.

The OM has ten regional offices, directed nationally by the College van Procureurs-Generaal (lit. 'College of Attorneys-General') in The Hague. Although it is considered part of the judicial branch, the OM is ultimately responsible to the Minister of Justice and Safety, who together with the college determines the priorities and organisation of the Service.
