= KLPD =

KLPD may refer to:

- KLPD-LD, a low-power digital television station (channel 30, virtual 28) licensed to Denver, Colorado
- Korps landelijke politiediensten, the national police force of the Netherlands from 1993 to 2013
- Kismat Love Paisa Dilli, a 2012 Indian film
