= Andy Kraag =

Dutch police officer and military officer (born 1976)

- Born: 1976 (age 49–50); Jakarta, Indonesia
- Occupations: Police officer, former military officer
- Known for: Head of the Dutch National Criminal Investigation Department

Andy Kraag (born 1976) is an Indonesian-born Dutch police officer and former military officer who served as head of the National Criminal Investigation Department (Landelijke Recherche) of the Netherlands. He became a prominent public figure as one of the leading faces of the fight against international organized crime and drug trafficking in the Netherlands.

== Biography ==
Kraag was born into a Dutch-Indonesian family. Both of his parents were born in Jakarta and migrated to the Netherlands as teenagers during the mid-1960s following political unrest in Indonesia. His family initially lived in boarding houses under difficult circumstances, a formative experience frequently referenced by Kraag in interviews when discussing identity, resilience, and social mobility.

He completed secondary education at the pre-university level (VWO) and initially enrolled in university studies in business administration and accountancy in Groningen. After two years, he left academia seeking a more action-oriented career and joined the Netherlands Marine Corps.

During his military career, Kraag became an officer in elite units and completed training as a combat diver. He served in international missions in the Balkans, Afghanistan and Iraq, and worked closely with allied special forces, including United States Navy SEALs. His military experience emphasized leadership, mental resilience, and teamwork, values he later carried into civilian service.

After leaving the armed forces, Kraag transitioned to the Dutch police. He held several leadership positions, including command roles within police arrest teams, before being appointed head of the National Criminal Investigation Department in 2019.

As head of the National Criminal Investigation Department, Kraag oversaw major investigations into international organized crime. He played a central role in operations targeting encrypted communication networks such as EncroChat and Sky ECC, which led to numerous arrests and convictions and were described by authorities as a turning point in combating organized crime.

Kraag was also closely involved in high-profile cases, including the international manhunt for criminal figures such as Ridouan Taghi, whose arrest in Dubai was publicly announced by Kraag in 2019. His public communication style, emphasizing clarity and resolve, contributed to his visibility as a national law enforcement figure.

In December 2023, Kraag announced his departure as head of the National Criminal Investigation Department. He was subsequently appointed Deputy Chief of Police of the National Expertise and Operations Unit (LX) and head of operations for Protection and Security, a role that includes responsibility for the protection of the Dutch royal family, politicians, and other threatened individuals.

Kraag has spoken publicly about representation and leadership, noting the importance of visibility for Dutch-Indonesian and other minority communities within national institutions. He has described his background as an important part of his identity but emphasizes professional merit and responsibility over personal prominence.
