= Korps landelijke politiediensten =

National Police Services Agency Korps landelijke politiediensten
- Patch of the KLPD

- KLPD logo from 1993 onward

- Flag of the KLPD
- Abbreviation: KLPD

Agency overview
- Formed: April 1, 1993
- Preceding agency: National Police (Dutch: Rijkspolitie)
- Dissolved: January 1, 2013
- Superseding agency: National Police Corps (Dutch: Nationale Politie)
- Employees: 63,000 at disbanding
- Volunteers: 1,500 at disbanding

Jurisdictional structure
- National agency: Netherlands
- Operations jurisdiction: Netherlands
- Area: 41,543 km2 (16,040 sq mi) (134th)
- Population: 17,100,475
- Governing body: Ministry of Justice and Security
- Constituting instrument: Police Act of 1993
- General nature: Civilian police

Operational structure
- Overseen by: KLPD Advisory Board
- Headquarters: Driebergen
- Elected officer responsible: Ferdinand Grapperhaus, Minister of Justice and Security
- Divisions: National Crime Squad; National Police Intelligence Service; Specialist Investigation Applications Service; Special Intervention Service; Highway Patrol; Railway Police; Water Police; Aviation Police; Mounted Police and Police Dogs Service; Operational Support and Coordination Service; Royal and Diplomatic Protection Service

The Korps landelijke politiediensten (KLPD; English: National Police Services Agency, lit. 'Corps [of] National Police Services') was the national police force in the Netherlands from 1993 until January 2013, responsible for specialist missions that benefited from a centralized approach.

The KLPD replaced the Rijkspolitie (English: National Police), which had existed from 1945 until 1993. The KLPD was independent from the regional police forces; but like them, it was subordinate to the Dutch Ministry of the Interior and had a staff of approximately 4,500. The KLPD operated both at national and international level from its HQ in Driebergen near Utrecht. The agency also maintained the national most wanted list.

In January 2013 the KLPD was merged into a single National Police Corps (Dutch: Korps Nationale Politie), divided in ten regional units and a central unit.

== History ==
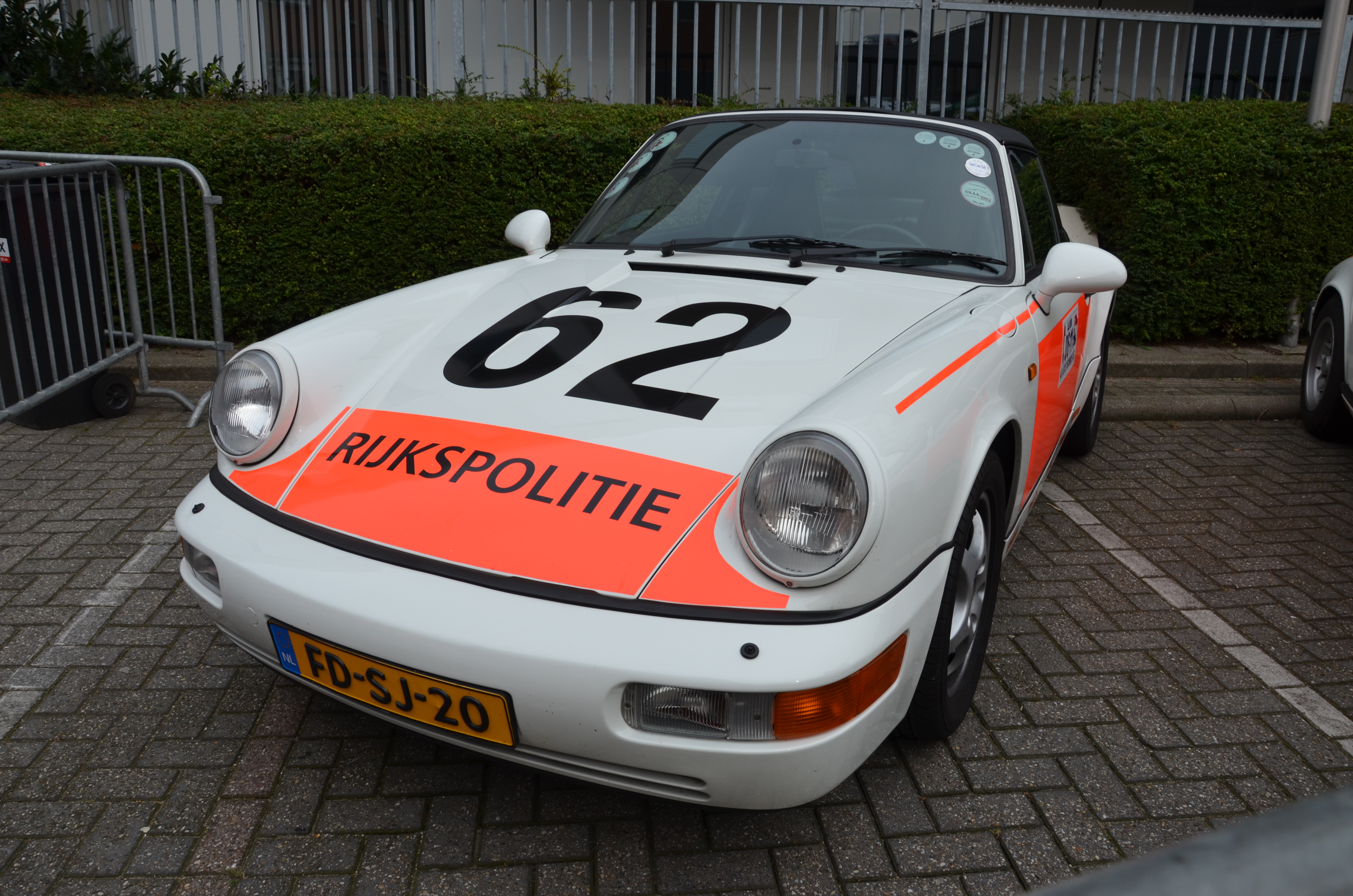
Porsche 911 in the livery of the old Rijkspolitie.

The KLPD was established in 1993 with the Police Act of 1993. The KLPD replaced the Rijkspolitie (English: National Police), which had been the Dutch national police force from 1945 until then.

== Divisions ==
The KLPD had 11 operational divisions.

=== National Crime Squad ===
The National Crime Squad (Dienst Nationale Recherche, DNR) has a staff of approximately 800 employees and a number of units located around the Netherlands. It investigates organized and other serious crime extending across regional or national boundaries. The service pays particular attention to preventive measures based on intelligence gathering, investigation and the provision of advice.

Examples of crimes it tackles are synthetic drugs, people smuggling, crime originating from South-East Asia and South America, major Dutch criminal networks, and crime connected with logistical hubs such as Schiphol Airport and the seaports. Other targeted areas include major fraud, serious white-collar crime, terrorism and war crimes. Owing to its international orientation, the DNR also plays a major role in dealing with requests from other countries for legal assistance. The DNR works closely with the regional police and the supra-regional teams. Its units at non-central level are based at various places in the Netherlands, generally close to the supra-regional teams. Personnel are usually on secondment from the regions.

Various other investigative services work closely with the DNR including the Fiscal Information and Investigation Service and the Economic Investigation Service, both of which come under the Tax and Customs Administration, and actively cooperate in tracing illegal aliens and imports.

=== National Police Intelligence Service ===
The National Police Intelligence Service (Dienst IPOL) is a new department combining the former International Police Cooperation Service (Dienst Internationale Politiesamenwerking, DINPOL) and the National Criminal Intelligence Service (Dienst Nationale Recherche Informatie, DNRI). It is responsible for cooperation with foreign criminal investigation agencies playing a major role in tackling serious cross-border crime. Dutch and foreign police forces can contact IPOL for information on foreign and Dutch investigations respectively. The service manages the Dutch branches of Interpol, Europol and the Schengen Information System (SIS); at national level, the Sirene office of the SIS; the KLPD's liaison officers abroad and foreign liaison officers in the Netherlands. Furthermore, it supplies criminal intelligence and expertise to the police forces. By maintaining databases containing data on crimes, criminal modes of operation and other information, IPOL helps to provide information on organized crime and serious forms of supra-regional crime. IPOL has several regional intelligence branch offices and criminal intelligence information desks which support the regional forces and core teams. IPOL develops new criminal investigation technologies and supports investigative teams by providing advice and expertise. It manages Edison (the image storage system for firearms and forged documents) developed by the former NRI and specializes in fingerprint identification. Finally, IPOL is responsible for production of the weekly TV crime-watch program ‘Opsporing Verzocht’.

=== Specialist Investigation Applications Service ===
The Specialist Investigation Applications Service ensures that the technological and tactical products, services and equipment used to combat organized crime are reliable and professional. For this purpose it devises innovative ways in which ultramodern technology can be used in police investigations.

Insignia of Dienst Speciale Interventies (DSI)

=== Special Intervention Service ===
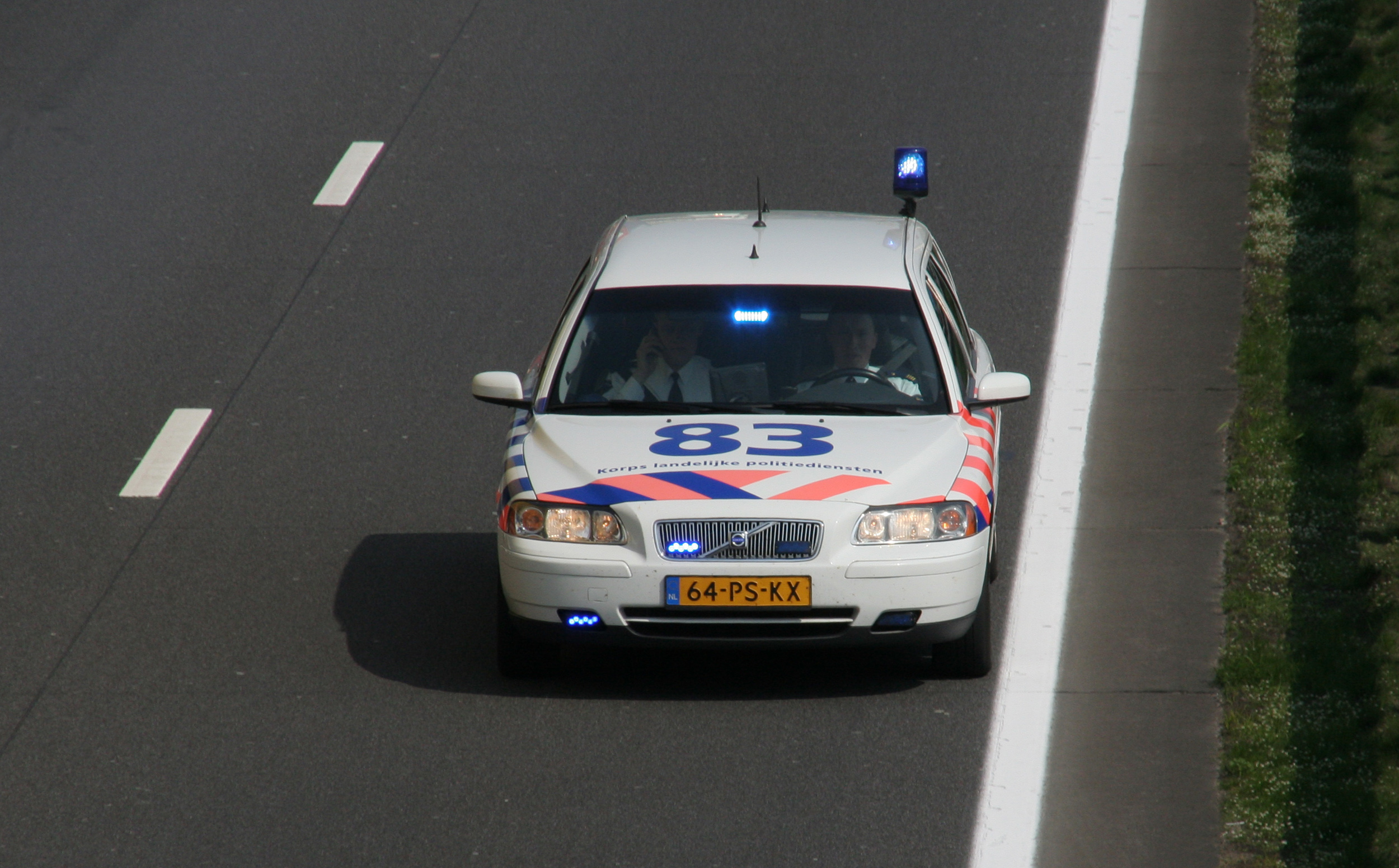
Volvo V70 on the A28 near Soesterberg.

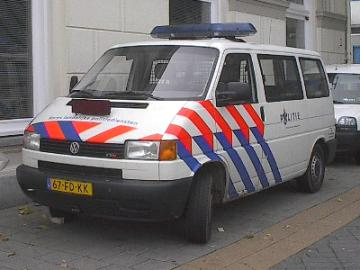
VW Transporter 4 from the railway police (KLPD)

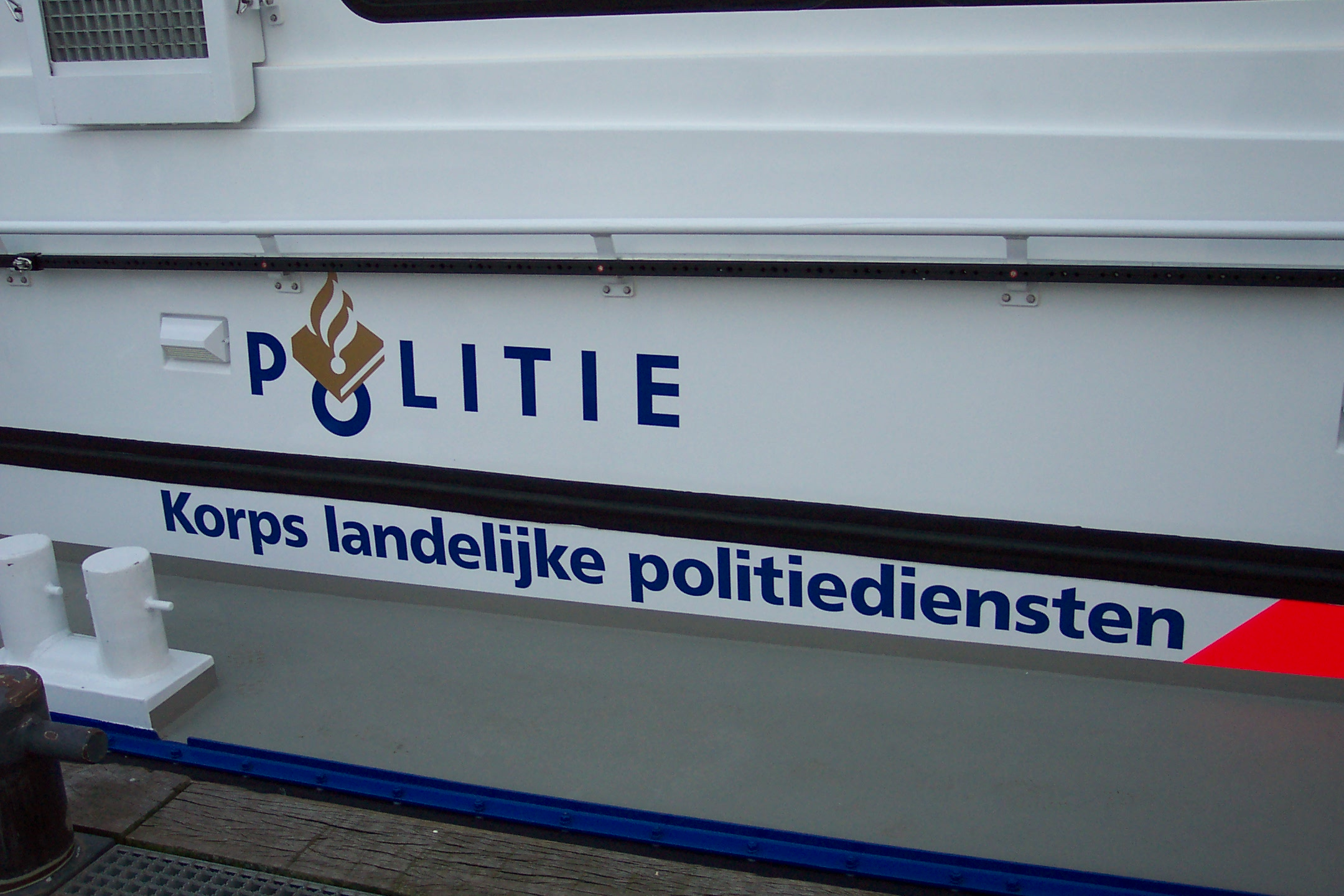
Logo on a KLPD-patrolboat from the water police

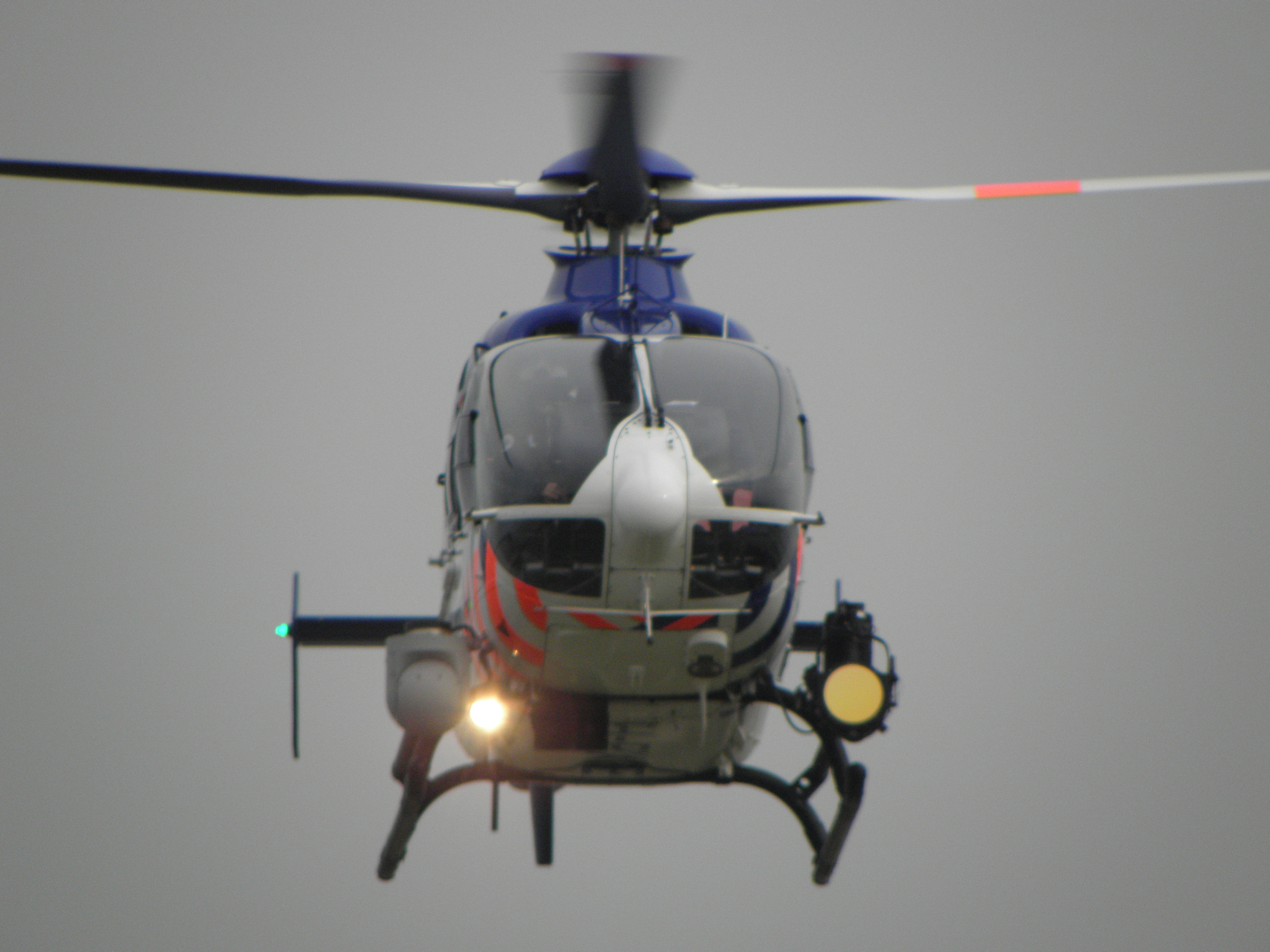
Helicopter from the Aviation police

Terrorists are also a threat to Dutch society and so in 2006 a new operational service was established at the KLPD. The Dienst Speciale Interventies (DSI) is the Dutch elite police anti-terrorist force that combines the SWAT units of the police and marines. It has a unit of specialized marines (Unit Interventie Mariniers), a unit with a mix of police and military personnel (Unit Interventie) and a unit with police marksmen (Unit Expertise & Operationele Ondersteuning). The law enforcement snipers of the Unit Expertise & Operationele Ondersteuning are armed with Heckler & Koch PSG1 and Mauser SR93 sniper rifles. All of them have received highly specialized training for dealing with special situations such as aircraft hijackings and hostage-taking. Operators in the DSI are former MARSOF operators from the Dutch Marine Corps, or former operators of the Speciale Security Brigade (BSB) from the Royal Marechaussee

=== Highway Patrol ===
The function of the Highway Patrol is to help improve safety and traffic flows on and around Dutch super-highways (Snelweg). They check for speeding, driving while under the influence of alcohol, drugs or medicines, and failure to wear seat belts. Unobtrusive surveillance systems are used to record offences on video. The Transport and Environmental Control Unit checks that trucks are in good condition and properly loaded, and monitors the transport of hazardous materials. Its Motorcycle Unit escorts VIPs. Finally, the Traffic Police are responsible for combating crime on the snelweg and at rest stops.

=== Railway Police ===
The Railway police patrol on and around the railways, maintain public order on and around the tracks and stations and investigate offences committed at railway stations and in trains. The Railway Police also investigates railway accidents. But in major cities like Amsterdam, Rotterdam, Eindhoven and Den Haag (The Hague) they can also be called upon to help out the local police. Because the KLPD, which the Railway Police is part of, is a federal police force like the German Bundespolizei, they can send patrols throughout their area of responsibility.

For instance the Noord-West (North-West) unit, which has its headquarters in Amsterdam, provides police services and patrols throughout the provinces of North Holland and Flevoland and assists the local police there. It also patrols the railway stations in that region.

The Railway police has its own Riot Police unit that specialises in riots on trains. It can be deployed during football matches with possible riot potential, but can also respond to other train-related riots or disturbances to assist local police.

=== Water Police ===
The Water police supervise commercial and pleasure craft, mainly on the arterial waterways and large expanses of open water. In addition, they provide assistance in the event of accidents and investigate collisions, other types of accident and environmental offences. The Water Police also operate along the coast and in coastal waters by providing assistance and emergency services on the North Sea.

=== Aviation Police ===
The Aviation police, in the Netherlands known as the Dienst Luchtvaart Politie (Police Aviation Service), provides assistance from the air, for example by monitoring large-scale events and tracking lost persons. The unit uses helicopters that can be fitted with special equipment such as video and infrared cameras. Further they use planes to photograph accidents. Another of their responsibilities is to investigate all aircraft accidents, and enforce air law, for example by conducting alcohol checks on pilots. The Aviation police operated 3 AgustaWestland AW139s and 6 Eurocopter EC135s in February 2019. The Eurocopters were ordered to replace the older MBB Bo 105. The AW139 is also available for use by the Dienst Speciale Interventies (Special Intervention Service).

=== Mounted Police and Police Dogs Service ===
The Mounted Police and Police Dog Service (Dienst Levende Have Politie, DLHP) supports other units with horse patrols and specially trained dogs. The mounted police maintains public order, conducts surveillance at public events and patrols in parks and recreational areas. The DLHP has approximately half of the 120 police horses in the region of Holland and has three units based in Nunspeet, Woubrugge and Boxtel. These mounts and their riders are available for service in all police regions in the Netherlands. The other police horses are assigned to regional police forces in major cities. The DLHP's dogs are trained to recognize a single specific scent. They specialize in identifying scents (identifying the scent shared by an object and a person), narcotics, explosives and firearms, detecting human remains, locating drowning people and fire accelerants.

=== Operational Support and Coordination Service ===
The Operational Support and Coordination Service (DOC) assists the KLPD itself, regional police forces and other government services in public order and security matters. It has four main functions: operational support, operational coordination, information coordination and the provision of teleservices. It ensures KLPD units are available around the clock and coordinates the deployment of personnel and equipment for large-scale police operations in the Netherlands and abroad.

=== Royal and Diplomatic Protection Service ===
The security of the King, other members of the Dutch Royal House, government ministers, ambassadors and foreign dignitaries is guaranteed by the members of the Royal and Diplomatic Protection Service (DKDB). The Minister of Justice issues the orders for the physical protection of individuals. The DKDB is located in The Hague.

=== Artificial Intelligence ===
The Q-team is a division of the national police forces that is specialized in artificial intelligence. For years, the police have faced barriers with the gathered data. Now the Q-team can try to make connections between all the data the police has stored and is looking to re-open a lot of 'cold cases' In the archives are more than 25 million pages with data waiting to be used, AI can bring the needed change for the police.
