= Janny Knol =

Dutch police officer (born 1969)

Chief Commissioner of the National Police Corps
- Incumbent
- Assumed office March 1, 2024
- Monarch: Willem-Alexander
- Deputy: Liesbeth Huyzer
- Minister of Justice and Security: Dilan Yeşilgöz; David van Weel; Foort van Oosten
- Preceded by: Henk van Essen

Chief of the East Netherlands regional police unit
- In office 2022–2024
- Preceded by: Oscar Dros

Deputy Chief of the North Netherlands regional police unit
- In office 2019–2022
- Preceded by: Gery Veldhuis

Personal details
- Born: August 1969 (age 57) Rotterdam
- Citizenship: Netherlands
- Education: Open University

Janny Knol (born 13 August 1969) is a Dutch police officer who has been the Chief Commissioner (Eerste Hoofdcommissaris) of the National Police Corps since March 2024. She has worked for the police since 1990.

== Education and career ==
Knol studied at the Meander College in Zwolle from 1981 to 1985. She then followed a three-year study in Social Work in the same city. In 1988, Knol started studies at the Netherlands Police Academy which she graduated from in 1993. Knol started her career in the police at the age of 21 as a police officer in Deventer.

In the early years she was active in various police regions, such as IJsselland, Gelderland-Midden and Twente. In 1995 she continued her studies in Legal Sciences at the Open University. Between 2000 and 2010, Knol followed several masters in leadership.

From 2013 to 2019, Knol was commissioner of the Twente district. After this, she worked for two years at the North Netherlands regional police unit as Head of Operations and was deputy chief commissioner of the unit. In her position, Knol was concerned, among other things, with the Intelligence portfolio, such as tackling online crime. In 2022, she became chief commissioner of the Eastern Netherlands regional police unit, succeeding Oscar Dros. On March 1, 2024, she succeeded Henk van Essen as Commissioner of the Dutch National Police. She is the fourth person, and first woman to hold this position.
