= Nationale Opsporingslijst =

The Nationale Opsporingslijst (English: National Detectionlist) is a Dutch most wanted list maintained by the National Police Corps. Individuals on the list can either be suspects, or irrevocably convicted, of certain crimes. Individuals generally are removed from the list only in the event of capture, death, or the withdrawal of the charges. A television program that likes to solve crimes, Opsporing Verzocht, normally publicizes fugitives newly added. Beyond the two criteria applied to both categories — that the criminal act bears a possible punishment of eight years in prison or longer, and that the success of other avenues of capture is deemed problematic — the Dutch Public Prosecution Service (Dutch:Openbaar Ministerie) has set criteria for placement of a suspect on the Nationale Opsporingslijst that are far more strict than for those of a convict.

== List ==
- Currently on the list.

Nr.	Nat.	Name	Date		Days	Comments
Nr.	Nat.	Name	On	Off	Days	Comments
057	(Netherlands)	M. Boer	October 10, 2017	Fugitive	3233	Wanted for leading a criminal organisation. Is one of the four founders of the outlaw motorcycle gang Satudarah.
056	(Suriname)	G.L. Palm	June 13, 2017	Fugitive	3352	Was arrested in Surinam for his involvement in a shooting in Noordeloos, Netherlands. Escaped from prison in Surinam.
055	(Morocco)	E. Adahchour	January 18, 2017	February 24, 2017	37	Was arrested for his involvement in two shootings. Escaped from custody in Rotterdam during a visit to the hospital. Arrested in Etten Leur.
054	(Netherlands)	S. de Coninck	September 6, 2016	October 29, 2016	53	Wanted for murder. Arrested in Arad, Romania.
053	(Netherlands)	G. Driessen	June 28, 2016	December 31, 2016	188	Wanted for a violent robbery, attempted manslaughter and theft. Arrested in Den Helder, where he committed an act of burglary.
052	(Netherlands)	Y. Dortangs	June 28, 2016	October 8, 2016	102	Wanted for a violent robbery, attempted manslaughter and theft. Arrested in Maasmechelen.
051	(Turkey)	S. Sezer	January 12, 2016	Fugitive	3870	Wanted for murder and attempted murder.
050	(Netherlands)	R.R.M. Inesia	September 29, 2015	Fugitive	3975	Wanted for murder and attempted murder.
049	(Netherlands)	M.V. Markiet	September 1, 2015	Fugitive	4003	Wanted for murder.
048	(Netherlands)	K.L. Markiet	September 1, 2015	Fugitive	4003	Wanted for murder.
047	(Morocco)	A. Benhadi	July 16, 2015	July 17, 2015	1	Was convicted for an attempted robbery and sentenced to 3 years imprisonment. Escaped from a detention center in Den Dolder on 14 July. Was removed from the list a day later by the police, his placing on the list was labeled as an administrative error. At the time of removing he remained a fugitive.
046	(Netherlands)	J.S. van Zanten	April 7, 2015	July 28, 2015	112	Wanted for attempted murder. Was gunned down in Barcelona on 28 July 2015. Critically wounded taken to hospital and arrested.
045	(Netherlands)	S. ter Welle	April 7, 2015	September 24, 2015	167	Wanted for attempted murder. Turned himself in at a policestation in Eindhoven.
044	(United Kingdom)	K.G. Salami	March 3, 2015	April 20, 2016	414	Wanted for murder. Turned himself in at Schiphol Airport.
043	(Turkey)	C. Akin	February 17, 2015	Fugitive	4199	Wanted for murder.
042	(Turkey)	U. Demir	February 17, 2015	July 7, 2015	141	Wanted for murder. Turned himself in at Schiphol Airport.
041	(Netherlands)	A.K. Parsowa	November 4, 2014	January 18, 2015	75	Wanted for attempted murder. Arrested in Suriname.
040	(Morocco)	F. Rahhaoui	October 7, 2014	Fugitive	4332	Wanted for raping a 6-year-old girl.
039	(Bulgaria)	A. Hristov	September 23, 2014	December 21, 2014	89	Wanted for two violent robberies. Found jailed in Belgium for other robberies.
038	(Netherlands)	H.E.S. Jacobs	August 12, 2014	July 7, 2015	4388	Wanted for attempted murder. Arrested in Spain.
037	(Morocco)	M. Faghlal	May 27, 2014	January 6, 2015	224	Wanted for robberies. Turned himself in at a policestation in Den Bosch, Netherlands.
036	(Netherlands)	E.M. Bircan	February 25, 2014	February 26, 2014	1	Wanted for burglaries, raids, kidnapping, aggravated assault and attempted homicide. Arrested in Schwerte, Germany
035	(Netherlands)	A.M. van der Ploeg	February 25, 2014	February 26, 2014	1	Wanted for burglaries, raids, kidnapping, aggravated assault and attempted homicide. Arrested in Schwerte, Germany
034	(Morocco)	M. Ben Salah	January 7, 2014	January 10, 2014	3	Wanted for sexual assault. Arrested in Amsterdam.
033	(Libya)	H.A. Aksema	November 26, 2013	Fugitive	4647	Wanted for murder.
032	(Romania)	G. Hartescu	October 15, 2013	November 8, 2013	24	Wanted for murder. Arrested on 25 October in Denmark after a burglary.
031	(Netherlands)	N.A. Ilina	August 14, 2013	October 3, 2013	50	Wanted for murder. Turned himself in at a policestation.
030	(Latvia)	J. Versinskis	July 2, 2013	July 23, 2013	21	Wanted for murder. Arrested in Latvia.
029	(Palestine)	A. Benhamza	May 21, 2013	June 26, 2013	37	Wanted for robberies. Arrested in Lanzarote.
028	(North Macedonia)	M. Nadzak	April 16, 2013	September 26, 2013	163	Wanted for murder. Arrested in Amsterdam.
027	(Netherlands)	C. Ata	February 19, 2013	Fugitive	4927	Wanted for murder.
026	(Republic of Ireland)	J. Staurvik	October 16, 2012	Fugitive	5053	Wanted for murder.
025	(United States)	J.R. Duarte	October 16, 2012	February 14, 2013	121	Wanted for murder. Arrested in New York City.
024	(Belgium)	A. Agharbiou	September 11, 2012	May 21, 2014	617	Wanted for robberies. Was arrested in the weekend of 17/18 May 2014 in Rabat, Morocco.
023	(Morocco)	R. Bennajem	February 1, 2012	March 16, 2013	389	Wanted for robberies. Shot to death on 16 March 2013 in Amsterdam.
022	(Netherlands)	R. Halman	August 16, 2011	April 20, 2012	248	Wanted for murder. Arrested in Hilversum.
021	(Morocco)	Y. Aananouch	August 16, 2011	August 17, 2011	1	Wanted for robberies. Arrested in Amsterdam.
020	(Morocco)	K. El Mahdi	August 16, 2011	June 25, 2011	314	Wanted for robberies. Arrested in Amsterdam.
019	(Netherlands)	R.J. Proveniers	April 27, 2011	May 29, 2011	32	Wanted for murder. Arrested after a high-speed chase near Nootdorp.
018	(Romania)	N. Negura	April 24, 2011	Fugitive	5594	Wanted for murder.
017	(Suriname)	C.J. van Assen	January 11, 2011	August 20, 2011	221	Wanted for murder. Arrested in Paramaribo.
016	(China)	B.Z. Chen	December 22, 2010	August 1, 2011	222	Wanted for two counts of manslaughter. Arrested in Germany.
015	(Suriname)	H.A. Ruimwijk	September 30, 2010	December 21, 2011	447	Wanted for murder. Arrested in Rotterdam.
014	(Sri Lanka)	M. Pyzer	June 11, 2010	May 20, 2011	343	Wanted for murder. Died before capture in Sri Lanka.
013	(Netherlands)	N.A. Chaudhry	June 11, 2010	Fugitive	5911	Wanted for manslaughter.
012	(Ghana)	A.K. Fuachie	April 26, 2010	Fugitive	5957	Wanted for robberies.
011	(Netherlands)	J.A.L.H. Hilkens	March 31, 2010	April 23, 2013	1119	Was convicted for drugs transports and sentenced to 10 years imprisonment. Was eventually removed from the list after a higher court acquitted him.
010	(Albania)	D. Gremaj	March 11, 2010	Fugitive	6003	Wanted for human trafficking.
009	(China)	J. Xia	February 3, 2010	Fugitive	6039	Wanted for murder.
008	(Netherlands)	M. Sno	January 5, 2010	February 17, 2010	43	Wanted for murder. Turned himself in at a policestation in Amsterdam.
007	(Belgium)	F. Eeckhout	January 5, 2010	January 6, 2010	1	Wanted for sexual abuse of children. Found to be jailed since October 2008 in Belgium.
006	(Netherlands)	S. Korz	January 5, 2010	Fugitive	6068	Wanted for murder.
005	(Netherlands)	R. Pouw	January 5, 2010	June 20, 2011	531	Wanted for drugs transports. Arrested in Barcelona.
004	(Bosnia and Herzegovina)	E. Habibovic	January 5, 2010	January 8, 2013	1099	Wanted for robberies. Caught according to Opsporing Verzocht, 8 January in Vienna where he committed an act of burglary.
003	(Netherlands)	E.C. Sijahailatua	January 5, 2010	October 25, 2012	1024	Wanted for multiple murders. Arrested in Brussels.
002	(Netherlands)	D. Soerel	January 5, 2010	August 27, 2010	234	Wanted for leading a criminal organisation. Arrested in Amsterdam.
001	(Morocco)	F. El Marzouki	January 5, 2010	February 14, 2010	40	Wanted for two murders. Arrested in Casablanca.

== Statistics ==
- In total 51 persons, 50 men and 1 woman (Bircan), were placed on the list.
- Shortest time on the list, 1 day: Franky Eeckhout, Yassine Aananouch, Antonio Marcos van der Ploeg, Enise Merve Bircan & Ali Benhadi.
- Longest time on the list, 6068 days and counting: Sharif Korz.
- 15 fugitives were caught outside the Netherlands.
- 5 fugitives turned themselves in.
- 2 fugitives died before they could be arrested.
- 1 fugitive was removed from the list after being acquitted on appeal.
- 1 fugitive was placed on the list by mistake, police spoke about an administrative error.

=== Reasons ===
- 26 fugitives for murder
- 9 fugitives for robberies
- 5 fugitives for attempted murder
- 2 fugitives for trafficking narcotics
- 2 fugitives for manslaughter
- 2 fugitives for multiple crimes
- 2 fugitives for sexual abuse of children
- 1 fugitive for sexual assault
- 1 fugitive for human trafficking
- 1 fugitive for leading a criminal organisation
- 1 fugitive for withdrawal from detention
