= National Police Corps (Netherlands) =

Law enforcement agency

National Police Corps Korps Nationale Politie
- National Police Corps patch worn by all uniformed employees

- The National Police Corps logo. The logo contains a book of law and a grenade with a flame standing for vigilance.

- Flag of the National Police Corps
- Common name: De nationale Politie (or de Politie)
- Motto: Waakzaam en dienstbaar Watchful and subservient

Agency overview
- Formed: 1 January 2013
- Preceding agencies: Korps landelijke politiediensten; Regiokorpsen; Rijkspolitie
- Employees: 62,942 (2019)
- Annual budget: €8.136 billion (2025)

Jurisdictional structure
- National agency: Kingdom of the Netherlands
- Operations jurisdiction: Kingdom of the Netherlands
- General nature: Civilian police

Operational structure
- Headquarters: The Hague
- Elected officer responsible: David van Weel, Minister of Justice and Security
- Agency executive: Janny Knol, Chief Commissioner
- Parent agency: Ministry of Justice and Security

Website
- politie.nl

The National Police Corps (Dutch: Korps Nationale Politie) is the national law enforcement agency of the Netherlands, and its sole police force. Constituted under the provisions of the Police Act 2012 (Politiewet 2012), the Corps functions as a single and unified police organisation operating under the political authority of the Minister of Justice and Security.

The National Police Corps is charged with the maintenance of public order, the enforcement of criminal law, the investigation and prevention of crime, and the provision of assistance in emergencies. It possesses general competence over the entire territory of the Netherlands and is vested with both administrative and judicial police powers.

It is divided into ten regional units, two national units, the police academy, police services center, and national dispatch center cooperation. The law-enforcement purposes of these agencies are the investigation of suspected criminal activity, referral of the results of investigations to the courts, and the temporary detention of suspected criminals pending judicial action. Law enforcement agencies, to varying degrees at different levels of government and in different agencies, are also commonly charged with the responsibilities of deterring criminal activity and preventing the successful commission of crimes in progress. The police commissioner (Dutch: eerste hoofdcommissaris) in the Netherlands is Janny Knol since March 1, 2024.

Besides police officers, the Netherlands has about 23,500 peace officers. These officers have a Special Enforcement Officer (SEO) status (Buitengewoon Opsporingsambtenaar) or BOA/Handhaving in Dutch and therefore have police powers (detaining suspects, ask for identification, make an arrest, issue fines within their power of offences and use force). They can be found within the transport police, game wardens and local enforcement agencies. The majority of BOA officers have the authority to carry and use handcuffs which can only be issued to officers who have the power to use force. A few councils also issue their officers, with permission from the Ministry of Justice and Security, police batons, pepper spray and occasionally firearms.

Their task depends on their area of operation. A game warden enforces nature laws, while a local enforcement officer enforces local ordinances and municipal code infractions. In 2018 unions were concerned with the increase of violence against these officers and had decided to make the consideration towards whether they would equip all these officers with the less-lethal weapons, batons and pepper spray, or make them part of the national police force.

== History ==
=== 1581–1812 ===
The history of the Dutch police starts in 1581, with the formation of the Dutch Republic. A simple police organization was created without clear tasks and powers. This stayed the same until 1810, when Napoleon annexed the Netherlands to the French Empire and started to set up a police force according to similar reforms elsewhere. Cities could free up money for a schout (sheriff); for towns this was a Veldwachter (constable).

=== 1813–1939 ===
The Netherlands regained its independence in 1813 and a year later King William I established the Corps de Marechaussee. The corps had twelve hundred employees and was a branch of the armed forces. It performs military tasks for the armed forces and non-military tasks for the Rijkspolitie (national police). In 1858, in addition to the Marechaussee, the Korps Rijksveldwacht (national constable corps) was created with fourteen hundred employees. This force focused on public order in rural areas. In addition to the two corps, there was also a Gemeentepolitie (municipal police) with eleven thousand employees, Politietroepen (police troops) with sixteen hundred employees, and the Gemeenteveldwacht (municipal constable).

=== 1940–1993 ===
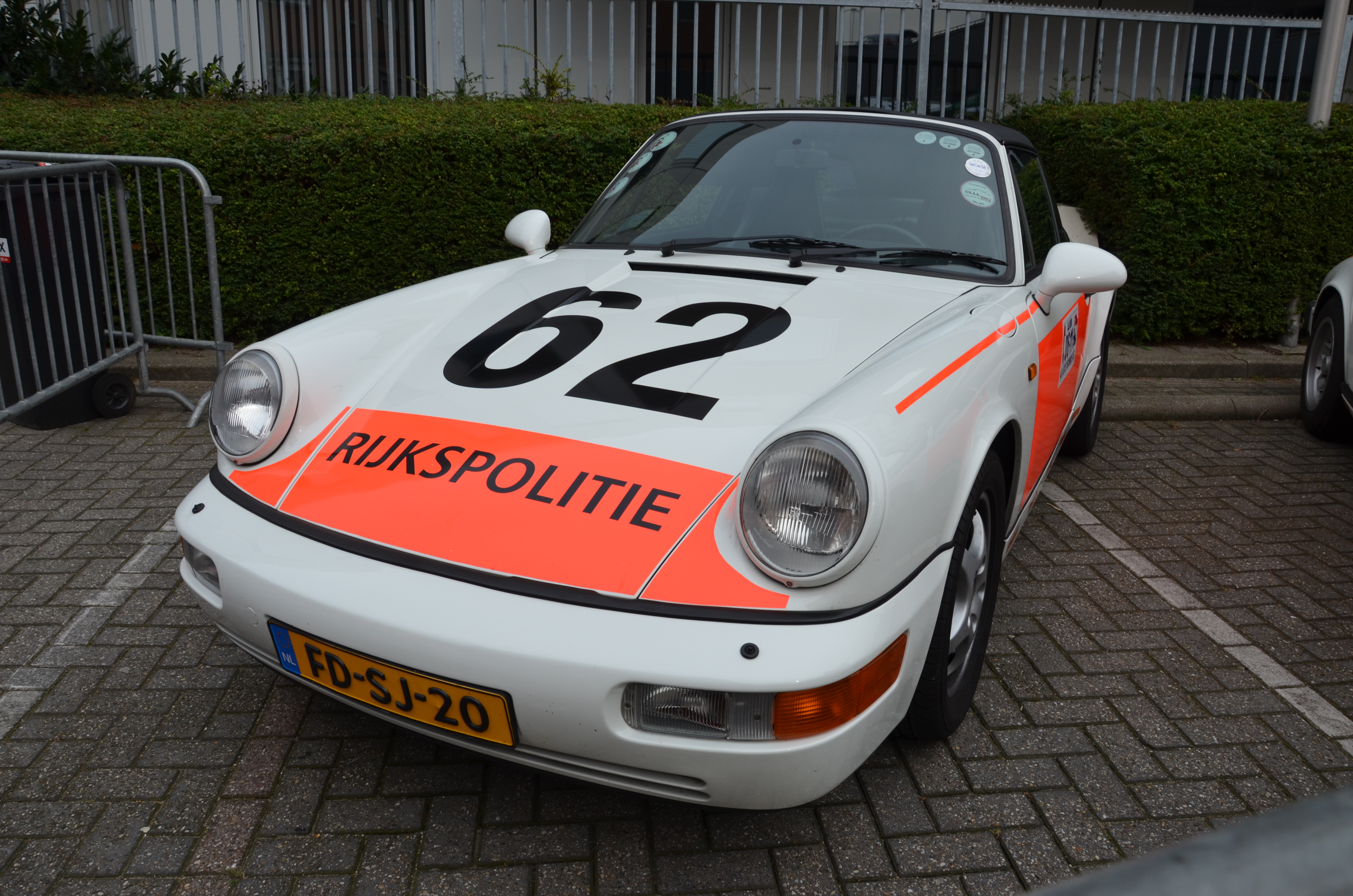
Porsche 911 in the livery of the old Rijkspolitie.

During World War II there was a Reichskommissar fur die Niederlande, Arthur Seyss-Inquart. The entire police force numbered about twenty thousand employees. After the war, this service is disbanded. To restore and control public order, the government decided to set up a new police organization in November 1945. A distinction was made between the Gemeentepolitie (municipal police) for designated municipalities, and the Rijkspolitie (national police) for the rest of the country.

=== 1994–present ===
The split disappeared in 1994, when the Police Act of 1993 took effect. After a major reorganization, the Rijkspolitie (national police) and Gemeentepolitie (municipal police) were merged into 25 Regiokorpsen (regional police forces) and the Korps Landelijke Politiediensten (national police services agency). Each corps worked autonomously. This structure lasted until January 1, 2013. From that day on, the police have been one organization, the Korps Nationale Politie (national police corps), divided into ten Regionale Eenheden (regional units), a Landelijke Eenheid (national unit), a Politieacademie (police academy), and the Politiedienstencentrum (police services center) that handles personnel. From then on, one Commissioner of police has directed police in the Netherlands. Since then, the police have started a new temporary branch for a joint dispatch center transition to one national system, known as the Landelijke Meldkamer Samenwerking (national dispatch center cooperation), and also split the Landelijke Eenheid (national unit) into two national units on January 1, 2024, one for expertise and operations, and one for investigation and interventions. The split was due to the unit being too big and diverse in its tasks for employees to progress, additionally the large spread of tasks made some services not get along, creating a negative work environment, the Schneiders Committee reported this decision because it would create clear separation and space to focus on specialized tasks.

== Organisation ==
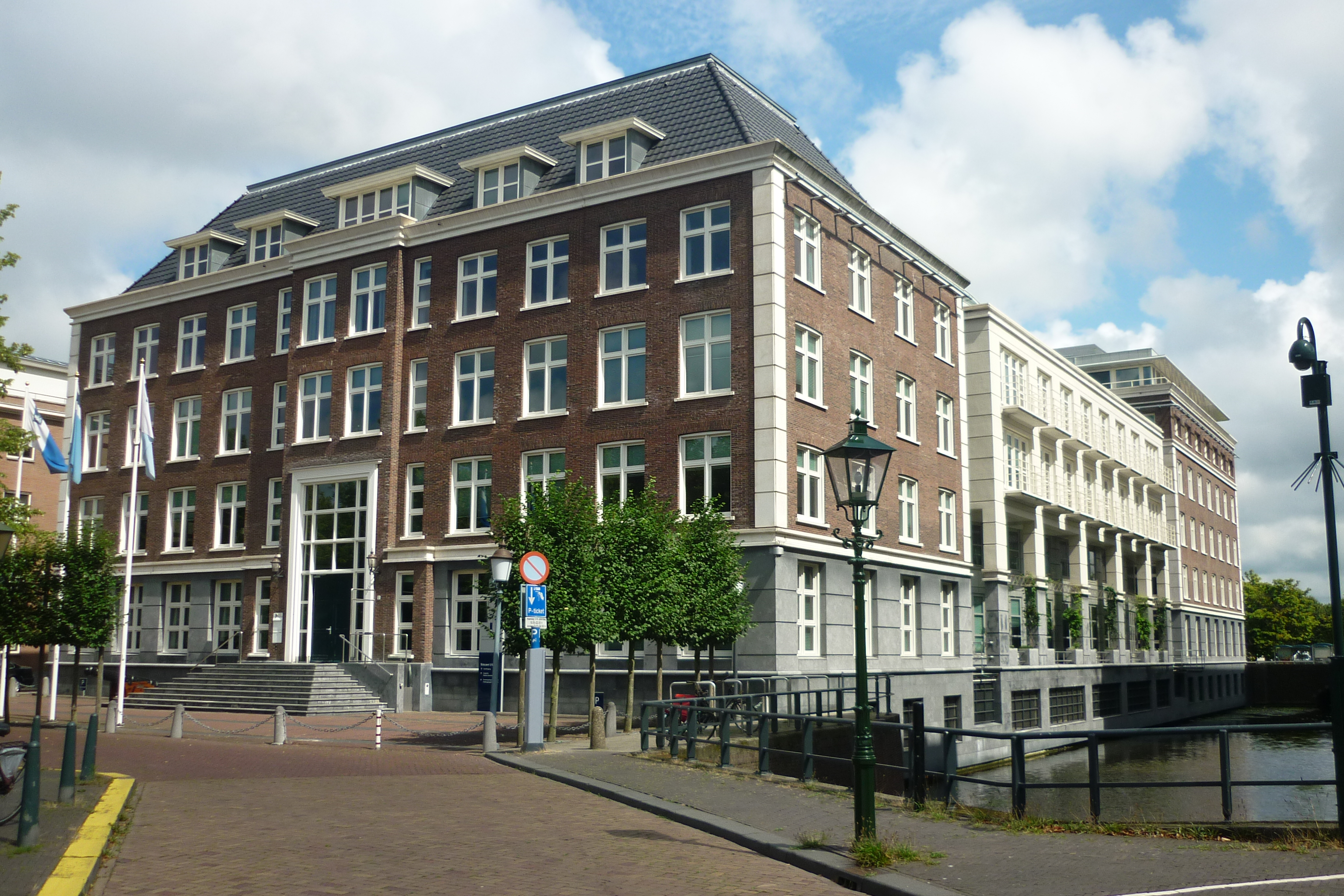
National Police headquarters during use by the Delta Program. The building has since been renovated with a modern interior, contrasting with the historical exterior.

In 2013 the police in the Netherlands was reorganized into its current structure with only minor changes since. The structure contains ten regional units, two national units (one for expertise & operations, the other for investigation and interventions), the police academy, the police services center, and the national dispatch center cooperation, all under one national police. Additionally, the police leadership has a small council and staff. Below, you find a list of all the units in detail.

=== Regional Units ===
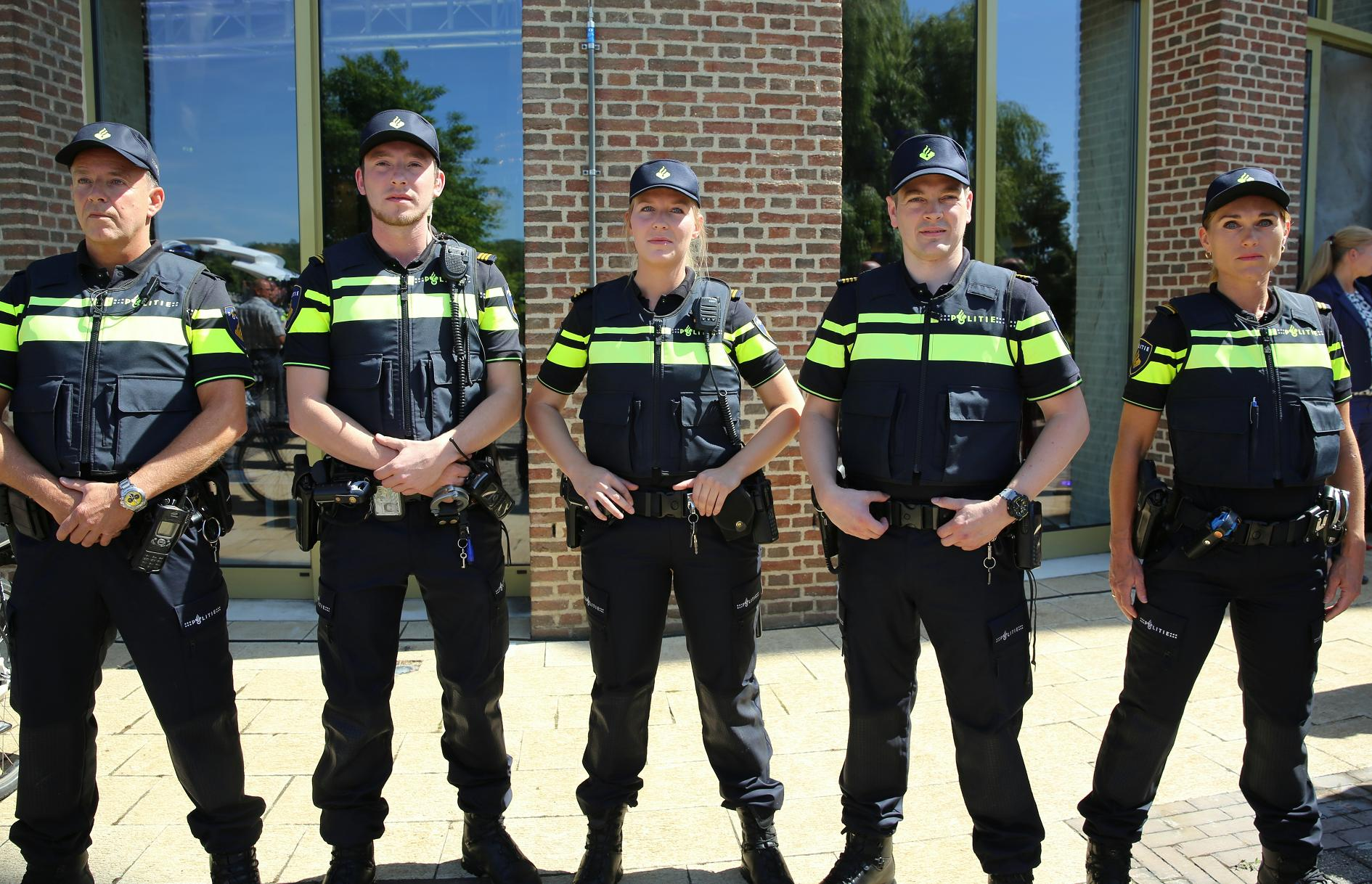
Police officers in uniform

The Netherlands is geographically divided by ten regional police units (regionale eenheden). These ten regional units are equal to the ten districts of the Public Prosecutors Office and courts. Each regional unit is divided in other layers of leadership and responsibilities, as described below.

Regional units
Unit	Service area
Noord-Nederland (Northern Netherlands)	Provinces of Groningen, Friesland and Drenthe
Oost-Nederland (Eastern Netherlands)	Provinces of Gelderland and Overijssel
Midden-Nederland (Central Netherlands)	Provinces of Utrecht and Flevoland
Noord-Holland (Northern Holland)	Province of Noord-Holland, except for Amsterdam
Amsterdam	City of Amsterdam, also Aalsmeer, Amstelveen, Diemen, Ouder-Amstel and Uithoorn
Den Haag	Province of Zuid-Holland, around the city of The Hague
Rotterdam	Province of Zuid-Holland, around the city of Rotterdam
Zeeland West-Brabant	Province of Zeeland, western part of the province of Noord-Brabant
Oost-Brabant	Eastern part of the province of Noord-Brabant
Limburg	Province of Limburg

==== Jurisdiction ====
Employees of regional units that hold law enforcement authority have jurisdiction across the entire country.

==== Tasks at regional level ====
At the administrative level of the regional unit, some of the following tasks are executed;

- Public affairs
- Internal Affairs
- Forensics investigation
- Criminal investigations that are too large or complicated for districts, like organized crime, homicides or district crossing investigations
- Prisoner transport and court police
- Police dispatch
- Traffic police
- Riot control
- Police dog handlers

=== Districts ===
Each regional unit is divided in districts. There are 43 districts across all regional units. A district is led by a Commissioner.

==== Tasks at a district level ====
- Criminal investigations of crimes that are too large of complex for the Basisteams
- Flexteams that provide temporary support to the Basisteams
- District intelligence units

=== Basisteams ===
A Basisteam (basic team) is the smallest organizational unit within the regional unit. A Basisteam is responsible for basic police work within a small geographic area. A basisteam is led by a Chief Inspector and has at least one building that serves as a public police station.

==== Tasks at the Basisteam level ====
- Patrol and incident response
- Community policing
- Public order at events and nightlife
- Criminal investigation for 'common crimes' such as shoplifting, other small thefts, assault and domestic violence

Insignia of the Dienst Koninklijke en Diplomatieke Beveiliging (DKDB).

=== National Unit Expertise & Operations (LX) ===
The National Expertise and Operations Unit builds a strengthened national intelligence picture by operating at a (inter)national level. Its main goal is to increase and strengthen the operational strength of the police. The unit makes high-quality knowledge, skills, intelligence/information, technology, and equipment available to other units and, where possible, to other security partners. In addition, it carries out broad police tasks (enforcement and investigation) on the main infrastructure, with specialist animals, and in the domain of VIP protection. This is done in consultation with the regional units. The police chief is Inge Godthelp. She is supported by the unit leadership and a staff. The LX has five services listed below.

==== Dienst Landelijk Operationeel Centrum (National Operational Center Service) ====
The National Operational Center Service is the center of the management of all current operations and ensures overview and coherence.

==== Intelligence LX ====
The intelligence department performs specific, national tasks such as international information exchange and national information coordination. The departments also provide an overview and insight into the (inter)national security situation for operational police work. The service within the police also functions as a contact point for Europol, Interpol and Dutch liaison officers who work abroad on behalf of the police. In addition, the Intelligence LX fulfils the intelligence function for the domains within the LX.

==== Dienst Specialistische Operaties (Specialist Operations Service) ====
The Specialist Operations Service provides operational support and high-quality (technological) innovation to the Dutch police. With its many specialist tasks, the service strengthens the regional and national units. Some of the services, among others, are the mounted police, search and specialist animals, the specialists of the National Forensic Service Center and the Network of Expertise Teams.

==== Dienst Infrastructuur (Infrastructure Service) ====
The Infrastructure Service combats insecurity and crime on the Dutch main infrastructure: on the highways, waters, rails and in aviation. The service also provides helicopter air support to increase the effectiveness of the police.

==== Dienst Koninklijke en Diplomatieke Beveiliging (Royal and Diplomatic Protection Service) ====
The police monitor and protect people, objects and services (ex: Dutch royal family, other dignitaries assigned by the authorized minister) at a national, regional, and local level. These security measures are well coordinated. As the threat increases or the security task becomes more complex, the measures to be taken also increase. In such situations, the Royal and Diplomatic Protection Service takes on a more prominent role and provides support with specific expertise and special resources. The service does this in close collaboration with the National Coordinator for Counter terrorism and Security, and the Public Prosecution Service.

Insignia of the Dienst Speciale Interventies (DSI).

=== National Unit Investigation & Interventions (LO) ===
The National Unit Investigation & Interventions works at a national and international level to combat serious and organized crime, terrorism, and cybercrime. In addition, the unit supports the police throughout the Netherlands with special interventions (DSI) and secret operations (AO). The unit does this in close cooperation with the regional units and partners. The police chief is Rob van Bree. He is supported by the unit leadership and a staff. The LO has four services listed below.

==== Dienst Landelijke Recherche (National Criminal Investigation Service) ====
The National Criminal Investigation Service combats serious and organized crime. But also, specific phenomena such as environmental crime, terrorism, and high-tech crime. In addition, the service is the official national investigative agency if Dutch people, or Dutch property outside of national borders become involved in or are the target of attacks or serious, organized crime activities.

==== Intelligence LO ====
The intelligence service contributes to the management and enrichment of criminal investigations, priorities and choices within the unit. They also enrich insight into phenomena and forms of crime. In addition, the intelligence LO fulfils the intelligence function within domains such as the intelligence service, secret operations and other partnerships (ex: National cooperation against undermining crime).

==== Afgeschermde Operaties (Hidden Operations) ====
Hidden Operations carries out shielded, covert operations in support of criminal investigations and provides (security) advice for criminal investigations. various teams carry out work for the regional units, the VIP Security system, the Rijksrecherche (internal investigations department), the Royal Marechaussee, the RST (kingdom investigations cooperation) and the BODs (special enforcement agencies). In addition, Hidden Operations collaborates with intelligence services and international partners.

==== Dienst Speciale Interventies (Special Intervention Service) ====
The Special Intervention Service combats all forms of serious violence and terrorism. The Police Arrest and Support Teams are part of this service. They act if it can reasonably be assumed that there are circumstances that are life-threatening for the police or others. They are the counterterrorism unit of the country.

=== Police Services Center (PDC) ===
The operational management of the police: finances, facility maintenance, information management, IT, communication, and human resources are organized nationally in the Police Services Center (PDC). It supports operational police work 24 hours a day, 7 days a week. Business operations staff do this from the PDC or, where necessary, in the field. Business operations provide the products and services that operational officers need to be able to work. By taking care of business operations, officers within the units have more time for actual police work. The Police services center has three locations in Rotterdam, Zwolle, and Eindhoven.

=== National Dispatch Center Cooperation (LMS) ===
The Landelijke Meldkamer Samenwerking or LMS is a relatively independent division of the police. The LMS manages and operates 10 shared regional dispatch centers. Each dispatch center houses police, ambulance services, fire brigade, and military police operators. If one center cannot operate another center can take over. These centers receive calls to 112 that automatically get directed to the national dispatch center, then they get put through to the right region. From there an operator asks and puts you through to the right service section in the building, the operator of that service directs the units to the location and gives them details as they come in, the operator also sees the units locations to be able to choose the closest units. The operator also determines if the situation is an emergency, and what priority the situation is, there are three priorities (One: use of lights and sirens, the vehicle is considered a priority vehicle. Two: no use of light and sirens, but vehicle has certain exemptions like driving the wrong way, parking on sidewalk, etc. Three: no use of lights and sirens and no exemptions, the vehicle is a regular road user).

==== List of dispatch centers ====
Coming soon

== Ranks and rank insignia ==
The daily police uniform has slide-on ranks, partly for quick replacement, while dress and parade uniforms have fixed, more professional ranks. Within the Dutch police the following ranks are in use:

National police ranks and rank insignia of the Netherlands
Rank / rank insignia	First Chief Commissioner (Eerste Hoofdcommissaris)	Chief Commissioner (Hoofdcommissaris)	Commissioner (Commissaris)	Chief Inspector (Hoofdinspecteur)	Inspector (Inspecteur)	Sergeant (Brigadier)
Epaulette						
Slide-on						
Rank / rank insignia	Senior Constable (Hoofdagent)	Constable (Agent)	Police Patrol Officer (Surveillant)	Police Trainee (Aspirant)	Employee with limited law enforcement authority (Niet-Executieve Medewerker)	
Epaulette						
Slide-on						

=== Employees with limited law enforcement authority ===
Some employees of the police perform a specialized task within the organization and did not fulfill the regular, complete education. They can exercise their law enforcement authority only when this in direct relation to their specific task. Legally they are considered 'Buitengewoon Opsporingsambtenaar' (special investigation officer) according to article 142 of the Criminal Procedures Code. These employees can be recognized by having the police logo as their rank insignia. Examples of these employees include;

- Prisoner transport, holding facility staff and court police (Team Arrestantentaken)
- Traffic enforcement employees who solely operate mobile speed cameras
- Service and intake employees, who take reports and assist citizens at the desk of their police station
- Security employees (Bewaken en Beveiligen)

== Equipment ==
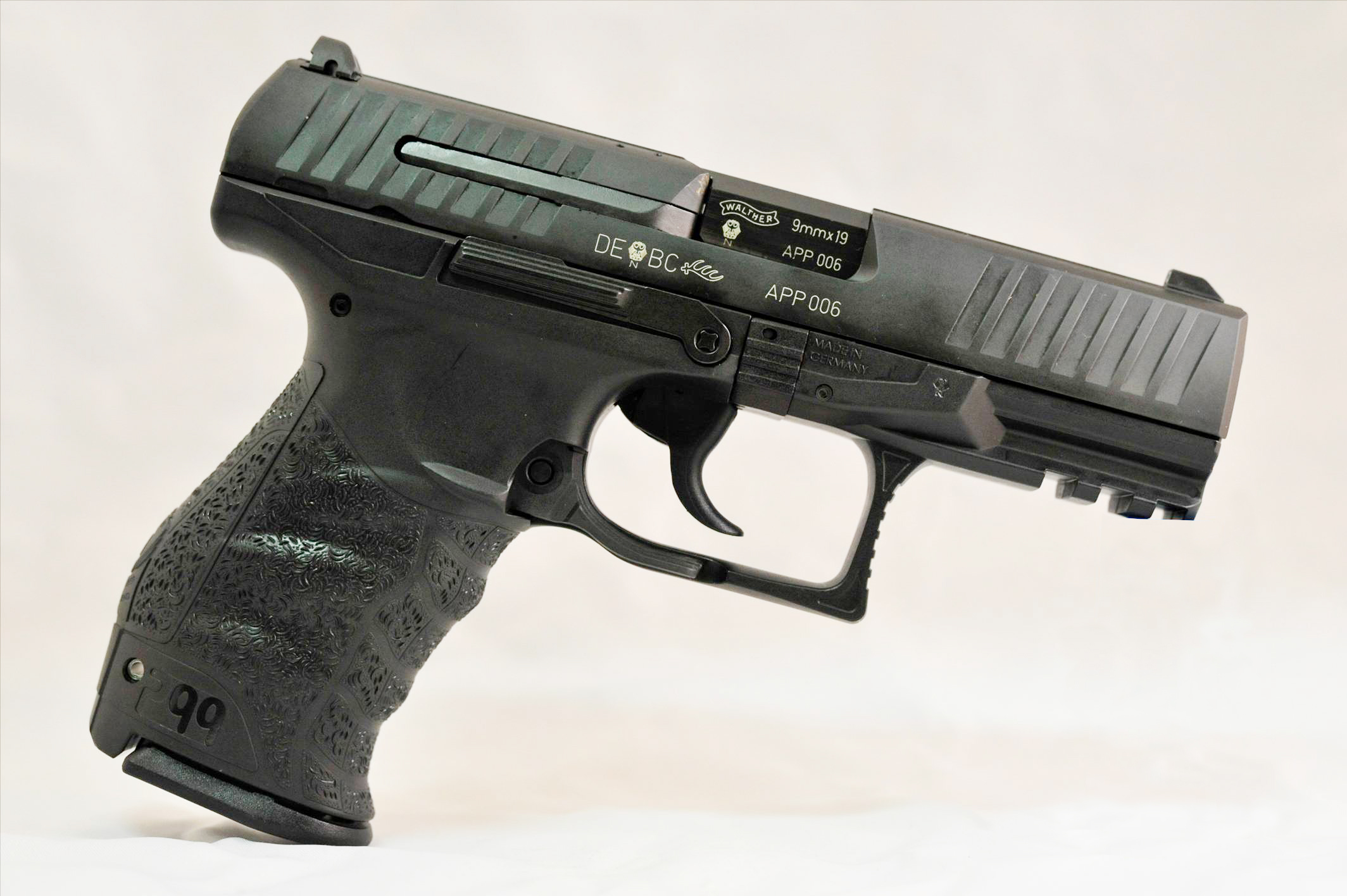
Walther P99Q NL (H3) police duty pistol introduced in 2013

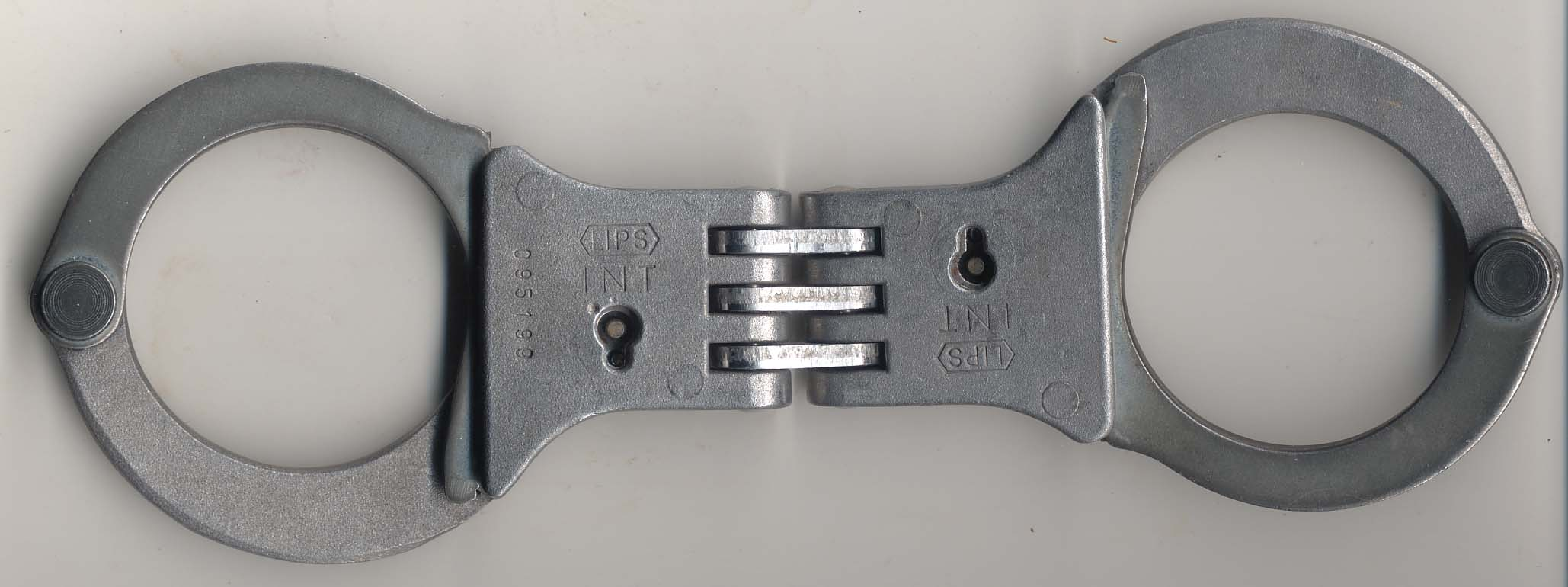
LIPS handcuffs used by Dutch police

Dutch police officers carry the following equipment:

- Walther P99Q-NL handgun
- Pepperspray
- Expandable baton (Bonowi EKA-51 Camlock)
- Handcuffs by SHN and LIPS
- Taser X2 stun gun
- Handheld radio on the national C2000 digital radio network

Not all officers carry handguns. For some positions officers are not trained in, and thus not equipped with, handguns.

The stun guns are only used by officers that work in a first responder position and are trained to use them.

Specialized equipment

- Heckler & Koch MP5, used by officers in specific teams tasked with temporary protection of objects
- SIG-Sauer MCX, used by the Special Intervention Service (DSI)

== Training and education ==
The Police Academy (Politieacademie) is responsible for training and educating new employees. There are several programs available. A candidate must first apply to an open position and be hired before he can start.

During their education, trainees are employed at the police so they receive salary during their training.

=== Basic police officer training ===
The regular, basic police officer education takes two years and is comparable to a college degree (MBO 4). During the education, the trainee holds the rank of Aspirant (Police Trainee). After nine months of full-time education, the trainee will combine studying at the police academy with learning on the job by a certified field training officer. After successfully completing the two-year course, the trainee will be promoted to the rank of Agent (Police Constable). In the next two years the employee will have to finish certain assignments to broaden his knowledge and experience, after which they are promoted to Hoofdagent (Senior Constable).

=== Bachelor of Policing ===
The bachelor of policing course prepares trainees for leadership positions within the organization. Just like the basic training, this course is a dual education course which means the trainee is both attending police academy and learning on the job. The bachelor's degree takes three years and applicants must already have a bachelor's degree before starting their education. Trainees hold the rank of Aspirant (Police Trainee) during their education, after which they are promoted to Brigadier (Sergeant). Within a few years of good performance they will be promoted to Inspecteur (Inspector).

=== Specialized courses ===
The Police Academy has several educational courses to train employees that will perform limited police tasks. Their training is limited and custom made for their specific duties. After finishing their course, employees can exercise their law enforcement authorities only within the scope of their specific tasks. Their limited law enforcement authority is signified by them having the police emblem on their shoulder, rather than a rank designation.

== Vehicles ==
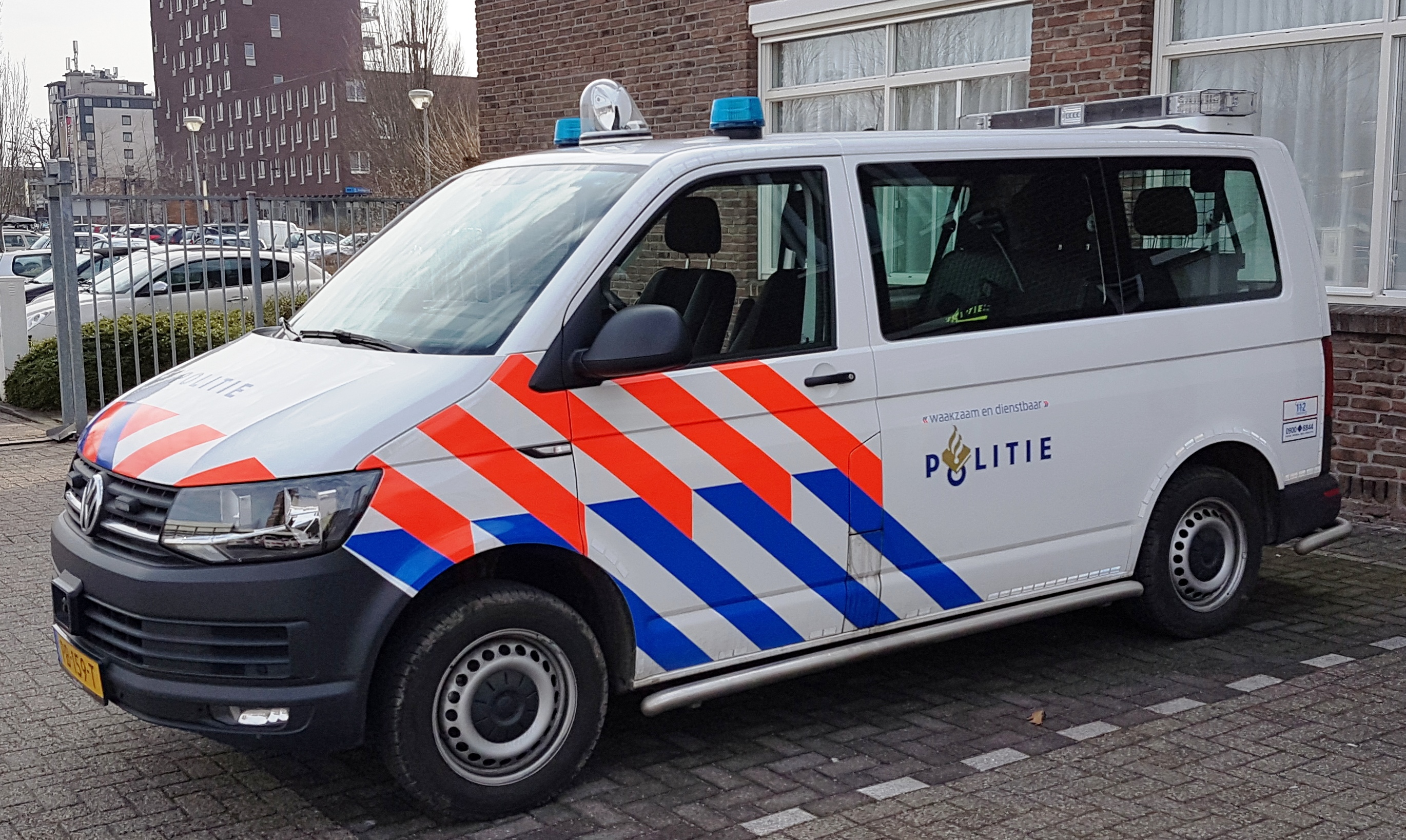
Volkswagen Transporter used for incident response duties. This model is being phased out.

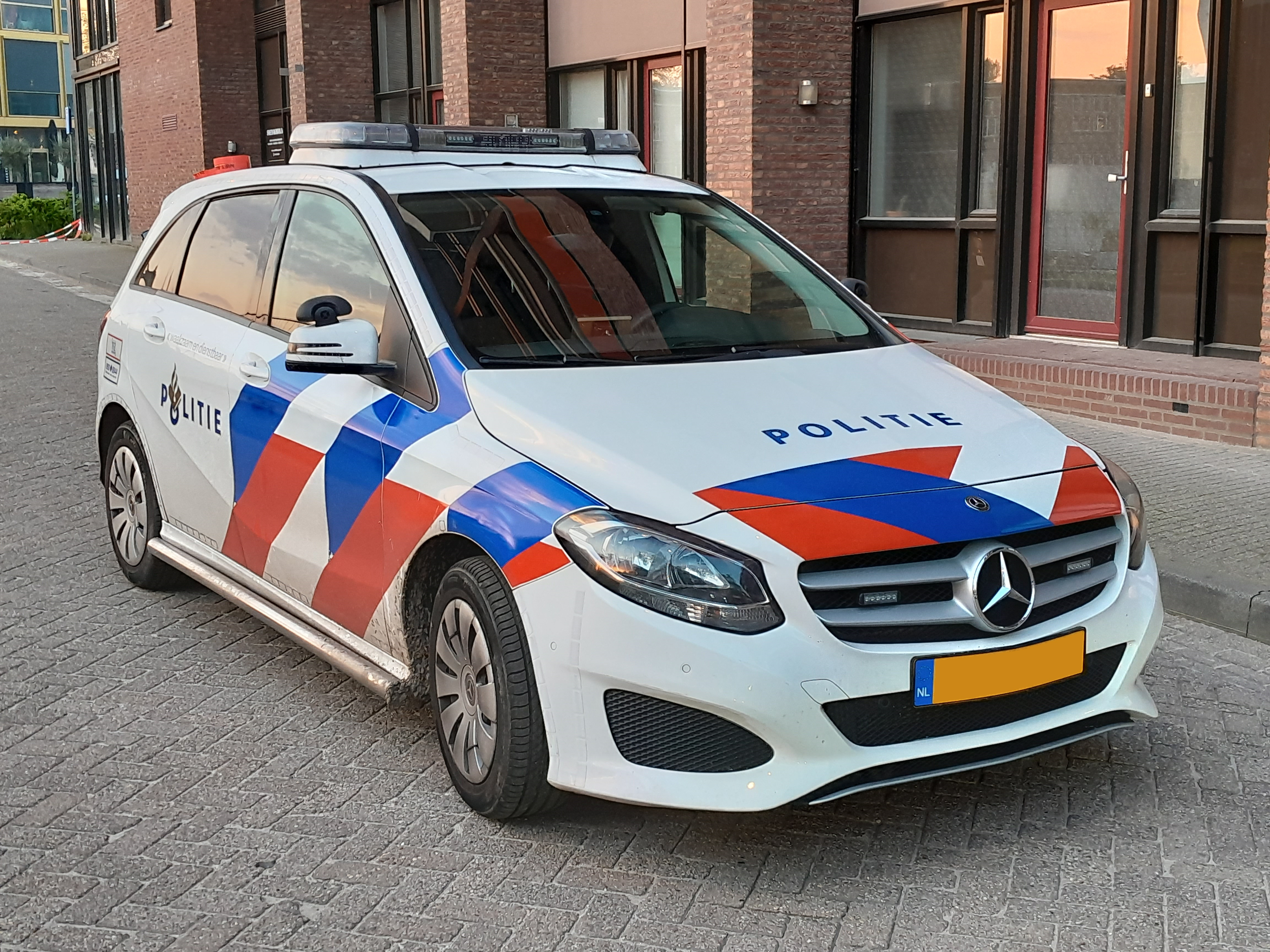
Mercedes-Benz B-Class

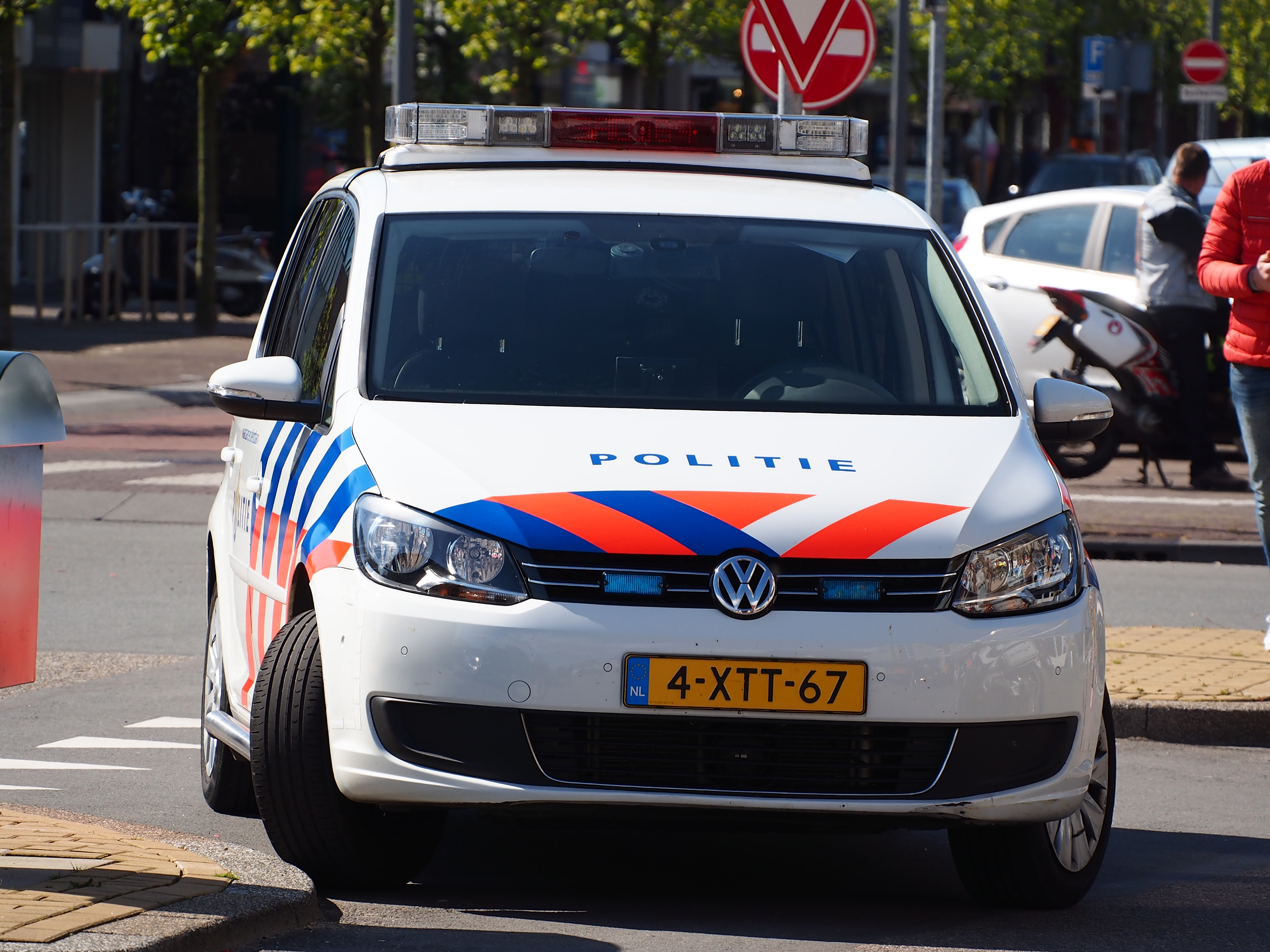
Volkswagen Touran

The Dutch National Police uses a variety of motor vehicles for its tasks. Each vehicle is purchased via a tender procedure.

Equipment

Each marked police vehicle is equipped with emergency lights and sirens, custom push navigation, a radio system, and a defibrillator. Vehicles that are primarily used for patrol and incident response duties are equipped with partially armored front doors, a megaphone and a modified suspension.

Driving training

Each police officer that must be able to drive in a police vehicle and drive with lights and sirens or deviate from the traffic rules in any other way must successfully follow a 4-day basic driving course. In this training the officer learns defensive driving, driving above the speed limit and how to safely deviate from the traffic rules, both with and without the use of lights and sirens. Officers need to take a refreshing course at least once every three years. Officers that perform specialized tasks with specialized vehicles, like traffic police or driving a riot van, have to do additional driving training.

Non-exclusive list of current police vehicles

General patrol cars
Type	Version	In use since	Comments
BMW X1	sDrive 18i (136 hp)	2025	Patrol and incident response
Ford Kuga	2.5l EcoBoost (152 hp)	2025	Patrol and incident response
Mercedes-Benz B-Class	B200 D (150 hp)	2017 (Being phased out)	Patrol and incident response.
Volkswagen Touran	2.0 TDI (150 hp)	2010 (Being phased out. No new Volkswagen Tourans are being delivered, except for dog handlers)	2 versions: one for patrol and incident response, one for dog handlers.
Volkswagen Golf	1.5 eTSI (petrol hybrid) (131 hp)	2022	Patrol and neighborhood policing. Lacks armored doors and some equipment.
Hyundai Ioniq 5	Electric (217 hp)	2022	Patrol and incident response. 8 vehicles to test electric vehicles in policing.

Traffic patrol cars
Type	Version	In use since	Comments
Audi A6	Electric/diesel hybrid (286 hp)	2015	Traffic and highway patrol. Designated as "fast intervention vehicle". Requires specialist driving course. Will be replaced by the Mercedes-Benz E450D in 2026.
Audi A6	Electric/diesel hybrid (204 hp)	2021	Traffic and highway patrol. Does not require specialist driving course.

Patrol vans
Type	Version	In use since	Comments
Mercedes-Benz Vito	116 cdi (163 hp)	2017	Patrol and incident response. Equipped with partially armored doors, search lights and a compartment to transport a suspect.
Volkswagen Transporter bike vehicle	2.0 TDI (150 hp)	2022	Used by bicycle units. Double cabin version with extended cargo area to transport up to three bicycles. Equipped with partially armored doors, search lights and a compartment to transport bicycles.
Volkswagen Transporter	2.0 TDI (150 hp)	2010 (Being phased out, no new deliveries)	Patrol and incident response.
Mercedes-Benz Vito	113 cdi (136 hp)	2017	Patrol. Downsized version with a smaller engine, no armored doors and less equipment. Recognizable by having two small emergency lights on its roof.
Mercedes-Benz Vito	116 cdi (163 hp)	2017	Dog handler vehicle. Has a shorter wheelbase and two dog crates in the rear.
Mercedes-Benz Vito prisoner transport	116 cdi (163 hp)	2017	Specialized vehicle used to transport up to 5 detained suspects.
Fiat Ducato prisoner transport	160 hp	2017	Specialized vehicle used to transport up to 7 detained suspects.

Announced vehicles

Type	Version	Will be introduced	Comments
Mercedes-Benz E-class	E450d (367 hp)	2026	Will replace the Audi A6.
Škoda Enyaq	Electric	End of 2025	Patrol and incident response. Will perform the same tasks as the BMW X1 and Ford Kuga.
Cupra Born	Electric	2026	Patrol and neighborhood policing. Will replace the Volkswagen Golf.

Aircraft

Type	Amount	Comments
Airbus EC-135	6	Used for aerial surveillance and air support
AgustaWestland AW139	3	Used for air support and transport of Special Intervention Service (DSI).

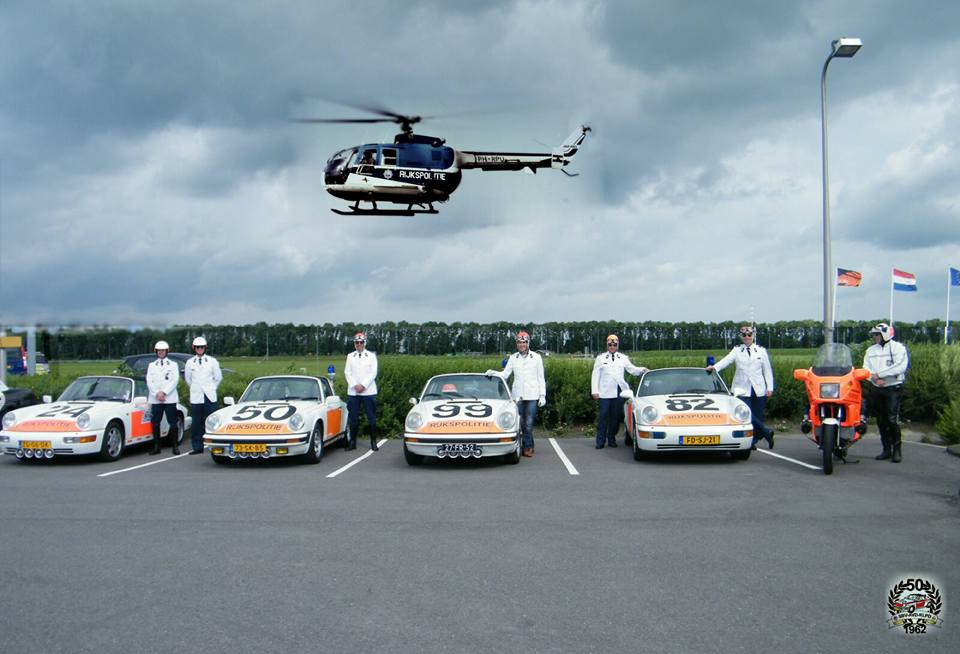
Dutch police Porsche 911s

Unmarked vehicles

There is a wide variety of unmarked vehicles in use for various tasks.

Porsche 356 / 911

From 1962 to 1996 the Dutch Rijkspolitie traffic police also made use of Porsche 356C, Porsche 914, Porsche 911 targa-topped patrol cars, painted in a distinctive orange livery, for use on the national motorway network. An open top was specified so that officers could stand up to direct traffic without leaving the car.

== Tasks ==
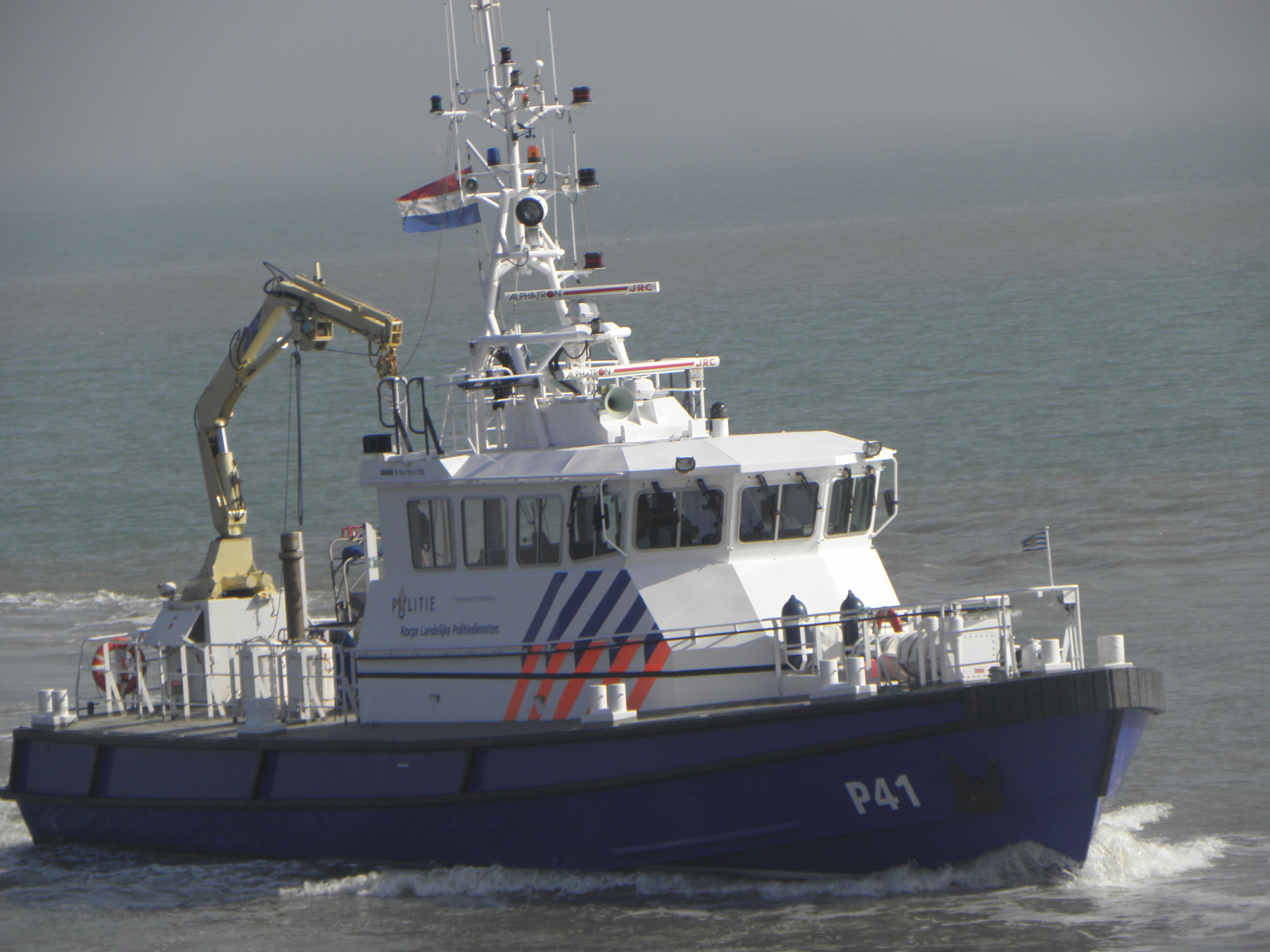
Dutch police boat

Since 2012, the new Dutch Police Law (Politiewet 2012) passed. The article which describes the police, has been changed from article 2, to article 3.

Article 3 of the Dutch Police law describes what the missions of the police are: "The task of the police is to, in subordination to the authorities and complying with applicable law, take care of the actual upholding of the legal order and to supply aid to those who need it." In practice this comes down to four main missions.

- Prevention (preventing offences and crimes)
- Investigation of crimes and offences
- Upholding the legal order
- Supplying assistance to civil authorities

Within the police, several departments are occupied with parts of these main tasks.

=== Communications center ===
All calls to the national police number 0900-8844 come in around the clock.

==== Systems in use ====
For a number of years, the communications centers have used the Gemeenschappelijk Meldkamer Systeem (Common Communications Center System, GMS). This system has a lot of functions. In the first place it functions as a plotting screen which displays every unit logged in. It also has a database function for procedures and phone numbers necessary for correctly executing police work and it links to the C2000 system and the CityGIS (GPS) system.

C2000 is the digital, secure communications system and, with CityGIS, police cars can be tracked on a map using GPS, which can be reported to the communications center using a VDO navigation system.

=== Basic police work ===
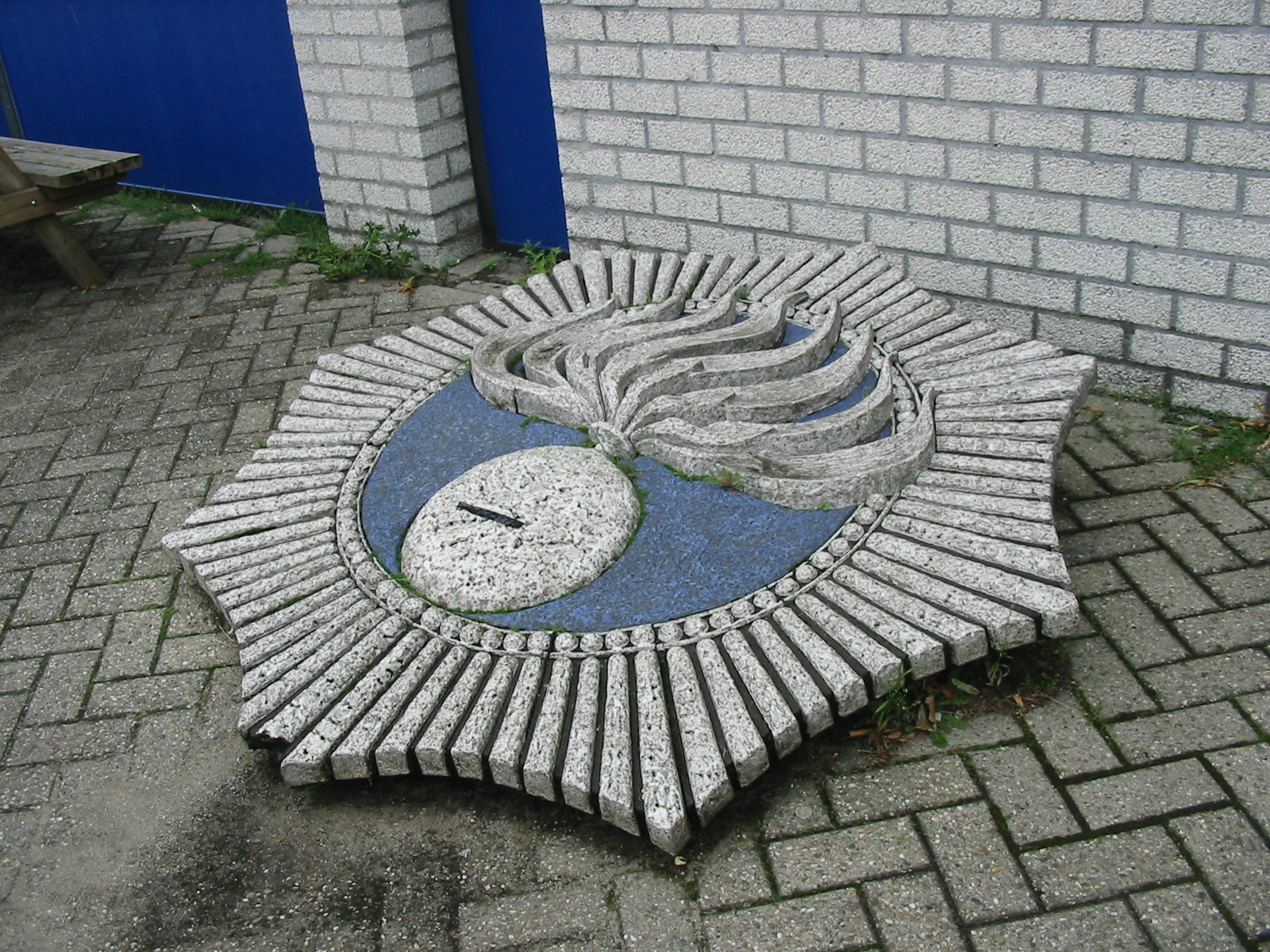
Old Dutch police emblem in stone, in front of the entrance of the Dutch Police Museum

In the Netherlands basic police work consists of the following tasks:

- Visible public policing: being visibly present on the street, on foot or in a marked car, prevents people from committing offences and crimes.
- Basic detective work: investigating petty thefts and burglaries is part of basic police work; when the case takes up too much time, it is transferred to the special branch.
- Giving crime prevention advice: giving advice on how to deter burglaries, advising municipalities on traffic issues, consultancy, etc.
- Providing assistance: assistance is provided to those who ask for it but also to game wardens, municipalities and other civil authorities etc.
- Dealing with traffic issues: traffic surveillance, handling traffic accidents, advising citizens and municipalities, traffic congestion security.
- Maintaining laws and regulations (often in conjunction with the special service): e.g., checking if foreigners are in possession of the right documents (visa, residence permit, work permit etc.) in cooperation with the immigration service.
- Special tasks: apart from daily activities a few special tasks are part of basic policing; these are executed independently or in conjunction with normal police activities, like the vice squad.
- National, (inter)regional investigations: investigating serious crimes such as murder, drug trafficking, trafficking in human beings, youth delinquency, arms trade, fraud, big environmental cases and sexual offences; the detectives are often supported by specialists.
- Information management: gathering and processing technical information (such as photographs and fingerprints) and information about criminal organizations by for example the Criminele Inlichtingen Eenheid (Criminal Intelligence Unit, CIE).
- Aliens: issuing residence permits and supervising people staying in the Netherlands who do not have Dutch citizenship.
- Environmental service: because environmental law is complex, this is a specialist mission. In several Dutch municipalities these tasks are entrusted to a special Milieupolitie (Environmental police).
- Operational support tasks: tasks that support basic law enforcement or specialist tasks, such as police horse and dog care, the Mobiele Eenheid (Mobile Unit, riot control), Aanhoudings- en Ondersteuningseenheid (Arrest and Supportunit, established for high-risk arrests) and observatieteams (observation teams, OT; comparable to ).

The Dutch government is keen to put more and more police "on the street". This means that the use of ICT will have to be improved so that constables do not lose a lot of time noting all their observations on paper for later use. The uniformed policemen on the street are those of the patrol service.

Sometimes police patrols drive directly from the communications center to the location where someone requested assistance. This can be a simple case of someone locking their keys inside their car, a complaint about litter or an inconveniently parked car. There are also more serious calls that need direct attention, like an accident with injuries, a stabbing, a burglary, vandalism; all events where the police have to act and reassure.

Surveillance is not only done from the patrol car, but also from a motorbike or a horse. Especially in crowded malls surveillance is often done on foot or (motor)bike. The men and women on the street have to permanently "keep their eyes open" to spot suspicious behaviour, such as someone walking around looking inside parked cars, cars without working lights or drunken cyclists.

Car owners are told that their lights are broken and why this is dangerous. A constable on foot may tell shop owners to put locks on their shelves outside to prevent shoplifting. If you report on a stolen bike, you will be told what kind of bike locks are most effective.

The police in a municipality are available 24 hours every day for basic law enforcement. More and more often the police will visit schools to teach pupils about drug prevention, vandalism or sex on the internet. The police in a municipality make sure that what is forbidden is not done, and that which is mandatory is actually done. They also make sure that anyone who asks for assistance gets it, supported by personnel from the district and the region. Since the early 90s several police regions have been working with neighborhood teams called neighborhood supervisors.

== Powers ==
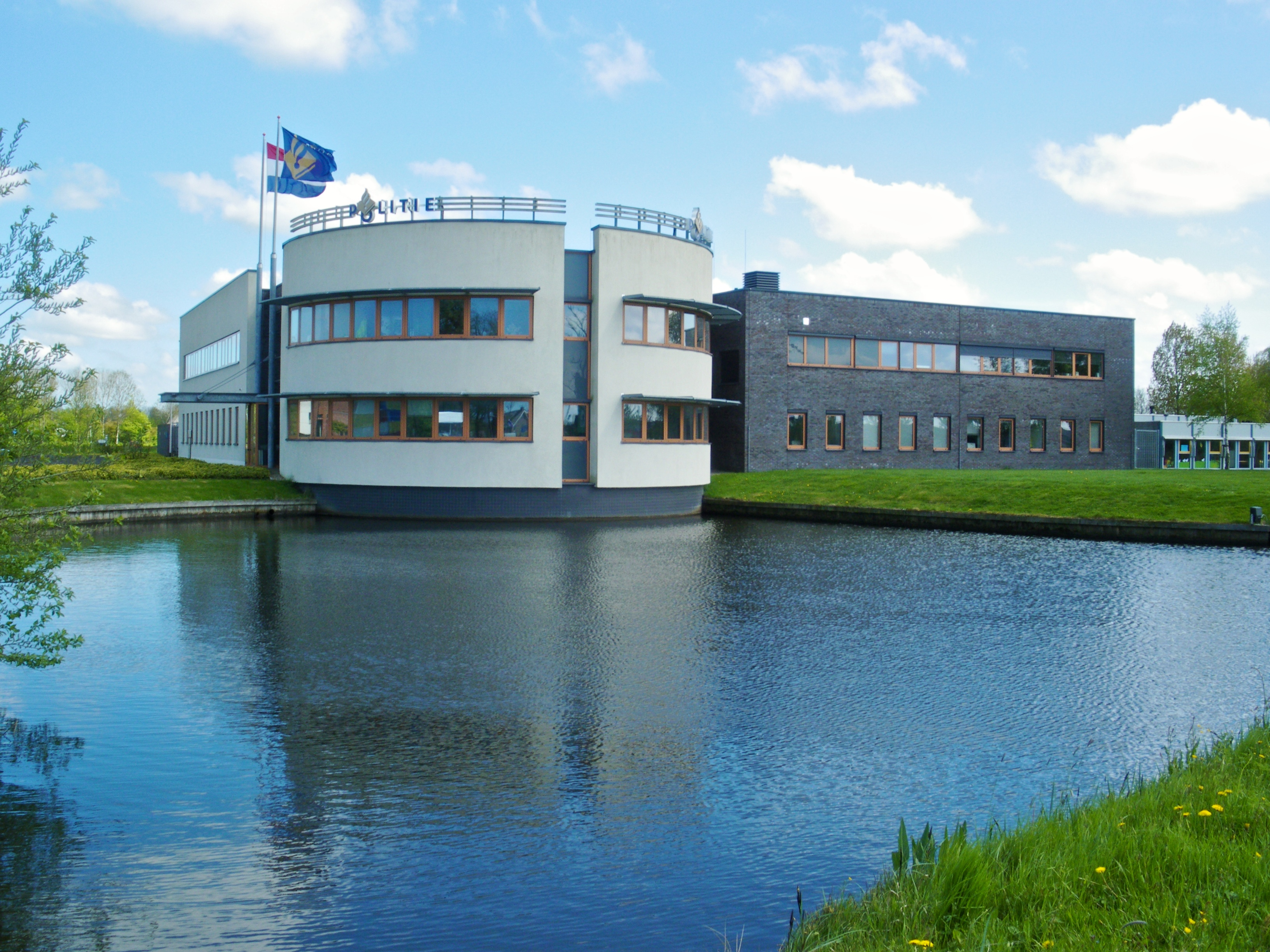
Police station at the water side in Dokkum, Friesland

The police have powers "ordinary" people do not have; e.g., an officer can stop or arrest people, or look in a shopping bag for lifted items, or (on authorization of the assistant prosecutor) search a home for arms. The police also have the power to use force. This power is often called the "monopoly on force". The police are one of the few organisations in the Netherlands that are allowed to use force, the use of which is bound by many rules and preconditions.

The power to stop someone is often confused with the power to arrest someone. The power to stop someone (”staande houden”) is the power of the police to make someone stand still, so that the police can ask for his name and address.

The power to arrest someone (”aanhouden”) is the power to detain an individual and bring him/her before an (assistant) prosecutor to decide on further prosecuting measures. However, this power is not only granted to the police. The Code of Criminal Procedure, article 53, sub 1, reads:

In the event of discovery in the act of a criminal offense, anyone is authorized to arrest the suspect.

The term "in the act" means "when it is happening". Only the police can arrest after the fact, and only with formal authorization from a prosecutor. Non-police arrests are executed by restraining the suspect while awaiting arrival of police.

The investigative powers of the police are for example described in the Police Law, the Arms and Munitions Law, the Opium Law, the Road Traffic Law 1994, the Law on Entry and the Code of Criminal Procedure.

These powers are bound by very strict rules. Some of these powers may be applied by an officer himself, like the examples before. Other police powers, like wiretapping, observation or searching premises, can only be used after permission is granted by the examining judge.

=== Cooperation with other services ===
When providing aid, the police cooperate with other services. When dealing with an accident for example, the police cooperate with ambulance services, doctors, fire brigade and Royal Marechaussee. In the event of serious emergencies, the police cooperate with the fire brigade, ambulance service, other government agencies and military forces in the security region corresponding to the police region. The police also work with international partners and are part of partnerships like the VGT and Interpol.

==== Slachtofferhulp ====
For providing support to victims the police cooperate with Slachtofferhulp Nederland (comparable to Victim Support). The employees of Slachtofferhulp are specially trained to provide support to victims of accidents and crime. They make sure that victims are coached, but they also help with filling in forms for insurance or a lawyer.

==== Continuing support ====
The police cooperates closely with support organisations that can continue providing support when the abilities of the police to do so come to an end. A few examples:

- Addiction care like the Consultatiebureau voor Alcohol en Drugs, or Novadic-Kentron.
- Mental health Care (for people who, e.g., want to commit suicide or are a danger to others)
- The Reclassering Nederland (the Dutch parole office)
- The youth parole office
- The Raad voor de Kinderbescherming (comparable to the Children and Family Court Advisory and Support Service)
- Social work, e.g., in case of domestic violence

== See also ==
- Criminal justice system of the Netherlands
- Law of the Netherlands
- Royal Marechaussee
- Fiscal Information and Investigation Service
- Dutch Customs Service
